= Invasion (Grey's Anatomy) =

- Grey's Anatomy episode
- Izzie Stevens trying to fight Reed Adamson, as the latter wants to take George O'Malley's old locker.
- Episode no.: Season 6 Episode 5
- Directed by: Tony Phelan
- Written by: Mark Wilding
- Original air date: October 15, 2009
- Running time: 43 minutes

Guest appearances
- Robert Baker as Dr. Charles Percy; David Bowe as Don; Sarah Drew as Dr. April Kepner; Alexie Gilmore as Sarah Freemont; Jesse Williams as Dr. Jackson Avery; Nora Zehetner as Dr. Reed Adamson; Freda Foh Shen as Missy Grant; Bruce French as Father Kevin; Héctor Elizondo as Carlos Torres

Episode chronology
← Previous "Tainted Obligation"	Next → "I Saw What I Saw"
- Grey's Anatomy season 6

"Invasion" is the fifth episode of the sixth season of the American television medical drama Grey's Anatomy, the show's 107th episode overall, and the first of a two-part patient crossover event with Private Practice. It was written by Mark Wilding and directed by Tony Phelan. The episode was originally broadcast on the American Broadcasting Company (ABC) in the United States on October 15, 2009. In the episode, the physicians of Seattle Grace Hospital must learn to co-operate with new Mercy West residents, who do not act in a kind manner to them. Other storylines include Callie Torres (Sara Ramirez)'s father returning to the hospital to condemn her bisexuality, and Izzie Stevens (Katherine Heigl) putting her career into jeopardy after administering the wrong treatment to a patient.

The episode was Heigl's last appearance before her five-episode hiatus to film a movie. It is set in a fictional hospital in Seattle, Washington. Héctor Elizondo returned as a guest star, while Sarah Drew, Jesse Williams, Nora Zehetner and Robert Baker made their first appearances. "Invasion" received positive reviews, with critics praising Drew's, Heigl's, Jessica Capshaw's, Ellen Pompeo's and Sandra Oh's performances. Upon its initial airing, the episode in the United States was viewed by 13.79 million people, garnered a 5.0/13 Nielsen rating/share in the 18–49 demographic and ranked third for the night in terms of viewership

The patient Sarah Freemont (Alexie Gilmore)'s life hangs in the balance after Izzie's dialysis error. Her arc concludes in the second half, a Private Practice episode titled "Right Here, Right Now", which sees Miranda Bailey (Chandra Wilson) fly Freemont to Addison Montgomery in LA for help.

== Plot ==
The episode opens with a voice-over narration from Meredith Grey (Ellen Pompeo) about confronting challenges and deciding whether to fight, adapt, or surrender when faced with overwhelming obstacles.

The hospital receives several surgical residents from Mercy West as they enter Seattle Grace, a repercussion of the recent merger. Meredith is recovering from her liver transplantation surgery, after donating a portion of it to her father. In the residents' lounge, Izzie Stevens (Katherine Heigl) tries to explain to Mercy West resident Reed Adamson (Nora Zehetner) that she should not use a certain locker, due to it formerly belonging to the deceased George O'Malley (T. R. Knight). Adamson ignores her wishes, and uses the locker, leading Stevens to threatening to fight her. Shortly thereafter, Cristina Yang (Sandra Oh) and Lexie Grey (Chyler Leigh) are working in the emergency room, when Owen Hunt (Kevin McKidd) embarrasses Yang by taking Mercy West resident Jackson Avery (Jesse Williams)'s side in a disagreement. Despite her mindset that all Mercy West residents would act in the manner of Adamson, Stevens develops a friendship with Charles Percy (Robert Baker). After months of the two not speaking, Callie Torres (Sara Ramirez)'s father, Carlos (Héctor Elizondo), shows up to the hospital with a priest, trying to condemn Torres for her concurrence in homosexuality.

Under the supervision of Derek Shepherd (Patrick Dempsey), Lexie works with Mercy West resident April Kepner (Sarah Drew) on a burglar and the two get in several disagreements, leading Lexie to steal her diary. Alex Karev (Justin Chambers) and Adamson continuously argue over the course of treatment for a patient, leading the patient's daughter to yell at them in disbelief. Angry about the revelation that Percy (who later apologized saying that they can be friends outside the hospital, but not inside) was using her, Stevens accidentally administers the wrong dialysis to a patient named Sarah Freemont (Alexie Gilmore), making her an unviable candidate for the kidney transplant she was scheduled to receive. After arguing over surgical cases for the entirety of the day, Yang comes to the realization that she needs a cardiothoracic surgeon to work at the hospital. After being mistreated by Kepner, Lexie begins to mock her about what is written in her diary, thus ruining her emotionally, but subsequently apologizes. Arizona Robbins (Jessica Capshaw), Torres' girlfriend, talks to Carlos, and convinces him to accept his daughter's sexuality. Having found out about Stevens' mistake, Miranda Bailey (Chandra Wilson) reprimands her and reports her to the chief of surgery Richard Webber (James Pickens Jr.). Webber asks Stevens to come into her office, and he fires her from the staff, noting that Hunt, Shepherd, and Karev had concerns with her coming back to work so early. Stevens departs, writing Karev a Dear John letter, causing him to break down in front of Meredith and Yang.

== Production ==
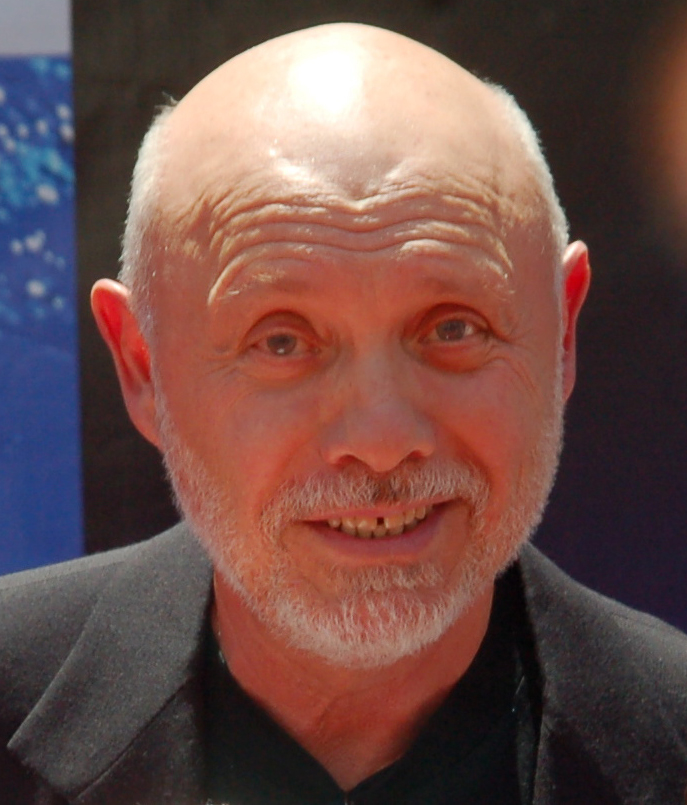
The idea of quoting bible verses came from Héctor Elizondo, who guest starred as Callie Torres' father.

The episode was written by Mark Wilding and directed by Tony Phelan. Jenny Barak edited the episode's music and Donald Lee Harris served as production designer. Eric Dane (Mark Sloan) was absent from the episode. Featured music included The Myrmidon's "Clap", Traildriver's "I Want You Now", and Greg Laswell's remake of "Your Ghost". "Invasion" was the last episode Heigl appeared in, before her five-episode hiatus to film the romantic comedy Life As We Know It.

Wilding called the guest stars "a blast to work with". He deemed the theme of the episode "invasion", adding that all the character's lives were being invaded. In the episode, Stevens makes a mistake, following a disagreement with Percy. Wilding commented that Stevens was originally seeking friendship with Percy, because he reminded her of O'Malley. At the conclusion of the episode, Torres ultimately reunites with her father Carlos. Wilding offered his insight on this and the overall episode:

"Shonda came up with the idea of Mr. Torres showing up with the family priest. I immediately said YES because anytime I can see Hector Elizondo on my TV screen, I'm all for it. In the scene where he's quoting the Bible at Callie, he really is afraid he's going to lose her. He's desperate, yanking out those index cards like her very life depends on it. It was Hector's idea to use the cards. He didn't think his character would know that stuff of the top of his head, which is how I originally wrote it. And he was right. And it worked beautifully. And that final scene when he and Callie are outside the hospital and he's asking her if she'll still get married, still have kids… I really, really liked that scene. And I really, really liked their whole story. All told, I thought the episode came out pretty well."

— Mark Wilding, Grey Matter

== Reception ==
=== Broadcasting ===
"Invasion" was first broadcast on October 15, 2009 in the United States on the American Broadcasting Company. The episode was viewed by a total of 13.79 million people, down 0.34% from the previous episode "Tainted Obligation", which garnered 14.13 million viewers. In terms of viewership, "Invasion" ranked third for the night, just behind CBS's juggernauts CSI and The Mentalist. The episode did not win in viewership, but its 5.0/13 Nielsen rating ranked first in its 9:00 Eastern time-slot and the entire night, for both the rating and share percentages of the key 18–49 demographic, beating out CSI, The Mentalist, Private Practice, and The Office. Although its rating won for the night, it was a decrease from the previous episode, which garnered a 5.4/14 rating/share in the 18–49 demographic.

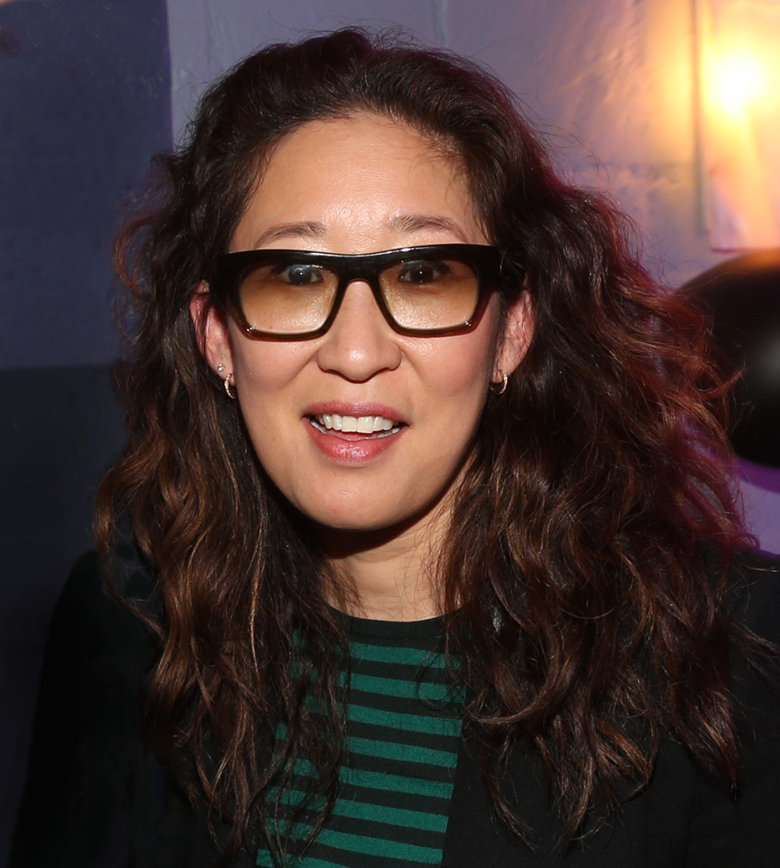
The episode's development of Sandra Oh's character was well received.

=== Critical reception ===
The episode received positive reviews among television critics. The Los Angeles Times' Carina MacKenzie's review of the episode was largely positive, though she called it "immature" of the episode's writers to have the characters in constant battle with one another, and deemed the Mercy West residents' orange scrubs unnecessary. MacKenzie highly praised the characterization of Kepner, in addition to Capshaw's performance, commenting: "Jessica Capshaw has an incredible ability to take even the most melodramatic of Grey's [Anatomy] speeches and deliver them with a subtlety and an honesty that makes them come off as sincere instead of overwrought." MacKenzie concluded that Karev, Yang, and Meredith had appropriate reactions to Stevens' departure.

Michael Pascua of The Huffington Post praised the scene in which Yang broke down to Meredith, noting the exceptional chemistry between them. Pascua was positive of the storyline between Torres, Carlos, and Robbins, writing that it was nice to see an emphasis on the gay storyline. Adam Bryant of TV Guide wrote that Baker's character "seems like the only decent guy in the bunch", though PopSugar asserted that Williams' character "proves to be most likable of the new doctors".
