= I Saw What I Saw =

- Grey's Anatomy episode
- Episode no.: Season 6 Episode 6
- Directed by: Allison Liddi-Brown
- Written by: William Harper
- Editing by: David Greenspan
- Original air date: October 22, 2009
- Running time: 43 minutes

Episode chronology
← Previous "Invasion"	Next → "Give Peace a Chance"
- Grey's Anatomy season 6

"I Saw What I Saw" is the sixth episode of the sixth season of the American television medical drama Grey's Anatomy and the show's 108th episode overall. Written by Peter William Harper and directed by Allison Liddi-Brown, the episode aired on the American Broadcasting Company (ABC) in the United States on October 22, 2009.

The episode begins in medias res, depicting events following a whodunit style, presenting the events from multiple perspectives in a fast-paced manner. It follows the doctors as they attempt to uncover the truth behind a medical error that leads to a patient's death.

Although fictionally set in Seattle, Washington, the episode was filmed in Los Angeles, California. Katherine Heigl (Izzie Stevens) was absent from the episode due to her hiatus to film the romantic comedy Life as We Know It (2010).

Upon its original broadcast, "I Saw What I Saw" was viewed by 15.40 million viewers in the United States, ranking #1 for the night, and garnered a 5.6/4 Nielsen rating/share in the 18–49 demographic. The episode received critical acclaim from television critics for its unique narrative structure, pacing and performances of the cast.

== Plot ==
The episode opens with a voice-over narration from Meredith Grey (Ellen Pompeo) about seeking new perspectives to uncover the truth, even when it leads to more questions and difficult challenges.

After victims of a hotel fire are rushed to the hospital, the residents of Seattle Grace and Mercy West compete for the best cases. Amid the chaos, a woman named Cathy Becker (Erinn Hayes), who was about to be discharged, unexpectedly dies due to a medical error caused by one of the many surgeons who treated her. Chief Richard Webber (James Pickens Jr.) launches an investigation to uncover the truth, with each doctor—Owen Hunt (Kevin McKidd), Cristina Yang (Sandra Oh), Miranda Bailey (Chandra Wilson), Alex Karev (Justin Chambers), Callie Torres (Sara Ramirez), Lexie Grey (Chyler Leigh), Charles Percy (Simon Baker), Jackson Avery (Jesse Williams), April Kepner (Sarah Drew) and Reed Adamson (Nora Zehetner)—giving their perspective on the events in the ER that day. As the doctors piece together the case, they revisit Cathy's injuries, including second-degree burns, chest pain, pneumothorax, and the cricothyrotomy that Alex performed on her. Alongside this, other storylines from the fire and the ER unfold.

Eventually, Reed realizes that the fatal mistake was made by April, who neglected to check the patient’s airway—already swollen from smoke inhalation—after being distracted by another patient with an axe lodged in his chest. As a result, Richard fires April. The residents react differently: some criticize April's negligence, while Cristina shows compassion for her former rival. Derek Shepherd (Patrick Dempsey) confronts Richard, blaming him for creating the chaotic environment in the ER due to the merger.

Alex, who is desperate to find his wife, Izzie Stevens (Katherine Heigl), constantly calling her and even threatening to file a missing person report.

Derek takes Meredith home following her discharge after the liver donation surgery, and recounts the entire chaotic incident in the ER to her, filling her in on the events she missed during her recovery.

== Production ==
The episode was written by William Harper and directed by Allison Liddi-Brown. David Greenspan edited the episode and Donald Lee Harris served as production designer. The episode's soundtrack featured music by notable artists, including Metric ("Blindness"), All Thieves ("We Will Be Dust"), Faded Paper Figures ("Polaroid Solution"), Jack Savoretti ("Songs From Different Times") and Matt Hires ("Out of the Dark").

== Release ==
"I Saw What I Saw" was originally broadcast on October 22, 2009, in the United States on the American Broadcasting Company (ABC). The episode was watched by 15.40 million viewers, an increase of 1.61 million from the previous episode, "Invasion", which garnered 13.79 million viewers. In terms of overall viewership, "I Saw What I Saw" ranked #1 for the night, surpassing CBS's Survivor, The Mentalist, and CSI: Crime Scene Investigation. Additionally, the episode earned a 5.6/14 Nielsen rating, securing the top spot in its 9:00 PM Eastern time-slot and for the entire night in the 18–49 demographic, outperforming shows like Survivor, NBC's The Office and 30 Rock, and ABC's FlashForward. Compared to the previous episode, which garnered a 5.0/13 rating share in the same demographic, "I Saw What I Saw" demonstrated an increase in ratings.

== Reception ==
"I Saw What I Saw" received critical acclaim from television critics for its unique narrative structure, pacing and performances of the cast.

BuddyTV gave a positive review, stating, "Notice how good Grey's Anatomy gets when it focuses on the medicine and ignores people’s drama? That, in a nutshell, is what happened to Seattle Grace following the so-called invasion last week. It was an awesome episode. Flashbacks are made of win, especially when you sort of know the ending, and everything feels like a gradual build-up to it."

A review on TV Squad offered a more mixed response, commenting, "There was a lot of potential that this episode could have gone with... The thing about what made the Grey's episode poor was that in Grey's, all perspectives were the same."

TV Fanatic posted a mixed-to-positive review as well, stating, "The question is whether it worked. We're going to go with a definitive yes... and no."
