= Shiny Happy People (Grey's Anatomy) =

- Grey's Anatomy episode
- Episode no.: Season 6 Episode 22
- Directed by: Ed Ornelas
- Written by: Zoanne Clack; Peter Nowalk
- Original air date: May 13, 2010
- Running time: 43 minutes

Guest appearances
- Demi Lovato as Hayley May; Marion Ross as Betty Donahue; Alan Mandell as Henry Stamm; Jason George as Ben Warren; Jonathan Goldstein as Ken May; Emily Bergl as Trisha; Amy Farrington as Mary May; Austin Highsmith as Amber Courier

Episode chronology
| ← Previous "How Insensitive" | Next → "Sanctuary" |
- Grey's Anatomy season 6

"Shiny Happy People" is the twenty-second episode of the sixth season of the American television medical drama Grey's Anatomy,, and the 124th episode overall. Written by Zoanne Clack and Peter Nowalk and directed by Ed Ornelas, the episode aired on the American Broadcasting Company (ABC) in the United States on May 13, 2010.

The episode follows Arizona Robbins (Jessica Capshaw) and Alex Karev (Justin Chambers) as they treat a psychiatric patient, while Miranda Bailey (Chandra Wilson) navigates her relationship with Ben Warren (Jason George). Richard Webber (James Pickens Jr.), Teddy Altman (Kim Raver), Owen Hunt (Kevin McKidd), Cristina Yang (Sandra Oh), Callie Torres (Sara Ramirez) and Lexie Grey (Chyler Leigh) work on an ex-couple who reconnect 50 years later.

Though fictionally set in Seattle, Washington, the episode was filmed primarily in Los Angeles, California. Demi Lovato, Marion Ross, Alan Mandell, Jonathan Goldstein, Emily Bergl, Amy Farrington and Austin Highsmith made their first guest appearances, while George reprised his role as guest star. The title of the episode refers to the song "Shiny Happy People" by the American rock band R.E.M.

Upon its initial broadcast, "Shiny Happy People" was watched by 11.05 million viewers in the United States and garnered a 5.1/13 Nielsen rating in the 18–49 demographic, ranking #3 in viewership for the night. The episode received mixed-to-positive reviews from television critics, with high praise directed towards Ross's performance.

Lovato's performance in the episode earned her the People's Choice Award for Favorite TV Guest Star.

== Plot ==
The episode opens with a voice-over narration from Meredith Grey (Ellen Pompeo), reflecting on how the pursuit of constant happiness can prevent us from recognizing true contentment, which often lies in the familiar and everyday moments of life.

At a party to celebrate Derek Shepherd (Patrick Dempsey), Owen Hunt (Kevin McKidd) approaches Cristina Yang (Sandra Oh) and asks her to move in with him. Although slightly intoxicated, Cristina agrees but warns Owen that her judgment might be impaired due to the alcohol. Meanwhile, Meredith becomes suspicious of a potential relationship between Owen and Teddy Altman (Kim Raver), suspecting there may be unresolved feelings between them.

During the party, surgical resident Reed Adamson (Nora Zehetner) flirts with plastic surgeon Mark Sloan (Eric Dane) in an attempt to initiate a casual relationship. Simultaneously, Miranda Bailey (Chandra Wilson) sets clear boundaries with her boyfriend, Ben Warren (Jason George), insisting they avoid public displays of affection in the workplace.

An elderly woman named Betty Donahue (Marion Ross) is brought into the ER with severe injuries from a car accident. In the same ER, an older man named Henry Stamm (Alan Mandell) is admitted with abdominal issues. The two recognize each other from years ago, reigniting a long-lost friendship. As they reminisce, they undergo their respective treatments.

Alex Karev (Justin Chambers) is assigned a young patient named Hayley May (Demi Lovato), who has been diagnosed with schizophrenia after attempting to harm herself. Karev, suspecting a misdiagnosis, orders further tests. Lexie Grey (Chyler Leigh) questions Alex about their relationship status, to which Karev casually confirms they are a couple. Meanwhile, Meredith warns Cristina about her suspicions regarding Owen and Teddy, planting seeds of doubt in Cristina’s mind about her relationship.

Alex's persistence in Hayley’s case pays off when additional tests reveal that she is not schizophrenic but instead suffers from a condition that causes extreme sensitivity to sound, which had been misinterpreted as mental illness. This discovery allows Karev to reassure Hayley that she is not "crazy".

Tensions arise between Bailey and Ben after Bailey sees him flirting with a nurse. Hurt and upset, Bailey leaves without hearing his explanation. Later, Ben clarifies that his flirting is a strategic way to navigate work relationships and assures Bailey that his real affection is for her, easing her concerns and mending their relationship.

In surgery, Lexie confides in Callie Torres (Sara Ramirez), admitting jealousy over Reed’s fling with Mark, despite claiming to have moved on. Elsewhere, Meredith confronts Owen, accusing him of harboring feelings for Teddy, which causes Cristina to doubt their relationship. Owen later reveals to Cristina that Teddy is a trigger for his PTSD, and during their conversation, Teddy overhears, complicating the situation further.

Meanwhile, Betty and Henry continue to reconnect, with Henry eventually proposing to Betty, and she happily agrees to move in with him, rekindling their old friendship.

Mark confesses to Lexie that he is still in love with her, prompting Lexie to point out that she is in a relationship with someone else. Mark, unfazed, suggests that she "could have a husband" instead.

Callie and Arizona Robbins (Jessica Capshaw) share a tender moment in the elevator, hinting at a possible reconciliation. Cristina informs Meredith that she has decided not to move in with Owen, and Meredith reassures Cristina by offering her a room in the house she and Derek are building.

== Production ==
The episode was written by Zoanne Clack and Peter Nowalk, with Ed Ornelas serving as director. On March 29, 2010, Demi Lovato announced on Twitter that they would be filming an episode of Grey's Anatomy during that week. It was later revealed that Lovato would portray a schizophrenic patient in a May episode. On April 14, 2010, Lovato posted a picture from the set, confirming their role. Additionally, Marion Ross's guest appearance in the episode was confirmed on April 19, 2010. Jason George reprised his role as Ben Warren, Miranda Bailey's (Chandra Wilson) love interest, while Jonathan Goldstein, Emily Bergl, Amy Farrington, and Austin Highsmith made their only appearances as Ken, Trisha, Mary, and Amber, respectively.

Clack and Nowalk initially pitched the episode's conclusion to Shonda Rhimes, suggesting that Warren would believe he and Bailey were not in an exclusive relationship. However, Rhimes felt this direction was inappropriate, and the storyline was revised. The episode’s thematic focus was initially conceptualized around "happiness", which evolved into an exploration of the difficulty in attaining happiness and how people often seek, fake, or hope for it to materialize. During the writing process, Clack and Nowalk considered including a scene where Alex Karev (Justin Chambers) and Lexie Grey (Chyler Leigh) leave the party to "make whoopie", but the idea was ultimately cut from the final script.

== Release ==
"Shiny Happy People" was originally broadcast on May 13, 2010, in the United States on the American Broadcasting Company (ABC). The episode was viewed by 11.05 million Americans, a slight decrease from the previous episode. Despite ranking #3 in overall viewership for the night, behind CBS's CSI: Crime Scene Investigation and The Mentalist, "Shiny Happy People" ranked #1 in its 9:00 PM Eastern time slot with a 5.1/13 Nielsen rating in the key 18–49 demographic, surpassing shows like CSI, The Mentalist, and Private Practice.

== Reception ==
"Shiny Happy People" received mixed-to-positive reviews from television critics, with high praise directed towards Marion Ross's performance as Betty Donahue.

HuffPost's Michael Pascua remarked that "Demi Lovato may have been the big celebrity name that was advertised on the commercials for Grey's Anatomy, but Marion Ross [...] had the most touching story." He also observed a shift in Sandra Oh's character, Cristina Yang, questioning "what happened to the headstrong independent Cristina of yester-season."

== Awards ==
Demi Lovato's performance in the episode earned her the People's Choice Award for Favorite TV Guest Star.
