= Grey's Anatomy season 6 finale =

"Sanctuary" and "Death and All His Friends"
- Grey's Anatomy episodes
- Episode nos.: Season 6 Episodes 23 & 24
- Directed by: Stephen Cragg ("Sanctuary"); Rob Corn ("Death and All His Friends")
- Written by: Shonda Rhimes
- Original air date: May 20, 2010
- Running time: Part 1: 41 min; Part 2: 43 min; Part 2 (extended DVD version): 62 minutes

Guest appearances
- Michael O'Neill as Gary Clark; Mandy Moore as Mary Portman; Nora Zehetner as Reed Adamson ("Sanctuary" only); Robert Baker as Charles Percy; Sarah Drew as April Kepner; Jesse Williams as Jackson Avery

Episode chronology
← Previous "Shiny Happy People"	Next → "With You I'm Born Again"
- Grey's Anatomy season 6

The sixth season finale of Grey's Anatomy consisted of two parts, "Sanctuary" and "Death and All His Friends". Both parts, encompassing the twenty-third and twenty-fourth episodes of the season, were written by Shonda Rhimes and originally broadcast on the American Broadcasting Company (ABC) in the United States on May 20, 2010. The first hour gained 13 million viewers and the second hour had an audience of 16.13 million viewers. The two-parter was praised by television critics for its writing, and the performances of the cast. It went on to be hailed as one of the best episodes of the series.

The two-part finale centers on a shooting spree at the hospital by a former patient's grieving widower Gary Clark (Michael O'Neill). The finale marked the last appearances for Nora Zehetner (who exited in the first half) and Robert Baker (who exited in the second hour) as Reed Adamson and Charles Percy, respectively; both the characters were killed in the shooting. Baker later reprised his role in Season 8 in "If/Then" and later in Season 12 in "Unbreak My Heart".

In the episode, Cristina Yang (Sandra Oh) and Jackson Avery (Jesse Williams) try to save the life of Chief Derek Shepherd (Patrick Dempsey), who was shot by Gary Clark in front of Meredith Grey (Ellen Pompeo) as she waits outside the OR with April Kepner (Sarah Drew). Miranda Bailey (Chandra Wilson) tries to save Charles along with her patient Mary Portman (Mandy Moore), while Richard Webber (James Pickens, Jr.) tries to get into the hospital. Callie Torres (Sara Ramirez) and Arizona Robbins (Jessica Capshaw) are stuck on a floor with all the younger patients of the hospital, Mark Sloan (Eric Dane) and Lexie Grey (Chyler Leigh) try to save the life of Alex Karev (Justin Chambers), who was shot as well, and Owen Hunt (Kevin McKidd) and Teddy Altman (Kim Raver) try to get their patient to safety.

== Plot ==
=== Sanctuary (part one) ===
The episode opens with a voice-over narration from Meredith Grey (Ellen Pompeo) about the comfort and familiarity of a once-safe place becoming unsettling and unfamiliar.

The hospital is hit with an unpredictable crisis: a shooter is in the hospital, which is quickly placed under lockdown. Meanwhile, Meredith Grey (Ellen Pompeo) discovers that she is pregnant, and Owen Hunt (Kevin McKidd) must choose between Teddy and Cristina (Sandra Oh). The shooter kills Reed Adamson and wounds Alex Karev (Justin Chambers). Lexie (Chyler Leigh) and Mark (Eric Dane) find the latter and try to save him. It is revealed that the shooter, Gary Clark (whose wife was a patient at the hospital and later died), is looking for Derek Shepherd (Patrick Dempsey). Meanwhile, on another floor of the hospital, resident Charles Percy has been shot by Clark. After a brief confrontation, Clark shoots Derek in the chest. Meredith, Cristina, and a petrified April witness the shooting, as Cristina holds back Meredith who shrieks in horror at witnessing the event.

=== Death and All His Friends (part two) ===
The episode opens with a voice-over narration from Derek Shepherd (Patrick Dempsey) about how life is defined by choices, with the most crucial decision—whether to live or die—often beyond our control.

Miranda Bailey (Chandra Wilson) and her patient, Mary, drag Charles through the hospital, hoping to take an elevator to an operating room on another floor, only to find the power has been shut off. Frustrated, Bailey breaks down with a rare outpouring of emotion, then gathers herself and sits on the floor, cradling a dying Charles. Bailey tells him she and Mary are going to stay with him and that he isn't alone, and Charles dies soon thereafter. Hunt arrives at the operating room where Cristina and Avery are trying to save Derek, but finds Clark in the room with a gun to Cristina's head, demanding that she let Derek die. Cristina and Avery refuse to stop working.

Clark claims that his only intention was to kill Derek as retribution for his wife's death, but that he will shoot Hunt and Cristina too. Meredith enters the room and tells Clark to shoot her instead, explaining that she is Lexie's sister, Derek's wife, and the closest thing Webber has to a daughter. He turns the gun toward Meredith, but Cristina says Meredith is pregnant. Hunt attempts to disarm Clark and is shot in the shoulder, knocking him unconscious. Cristina and Avery reluctantly raise their hands, and Clark watches the heart monitor as Derek flatlines. Clark leaves, as April and Meredith attend to Hunt's gunshot wound. April notices Meredith is bleeding and asks if she has been shot. Meredith absently tells April she is having a miscarriage and continues to work on Hunt.

Webber finds a way through the police blockade and walks through the halls of the hospital, finding several bodies. Eventually he finds Clark, who tells him he'd bought the gun at a superstore and bought extra ammo because it was on sale. Clark tells Webber he has one bullet left, revealing that he planned on shooting Webber, then himself. Eventually, after Webber convinces Clark that his wife wouldn't want the shooting and would rather be reunited with him, Clark commits suicide with the SWAT team directly outside the door.

In the operating room, Derek's heartbeat returns to normal as it is revealed Avery had manipulated the heart monitor to flatline, and the operation to save him resumes. Outside the hospital, Arizona and Callie reinstate their relationship when Callie says she doesn't want to have a baby if it means she can't be with Arizona. Arizona agrees to have a baby because she doesn't want to stop Callie from being an excellent mother. Mark and Lexie show up at the other hospital. Alex is out of surgery, and Mark watches as Lexie takes Alex's hand. Meredith takes another look at her positive pregnancy test, and throws it away.

== Production ==
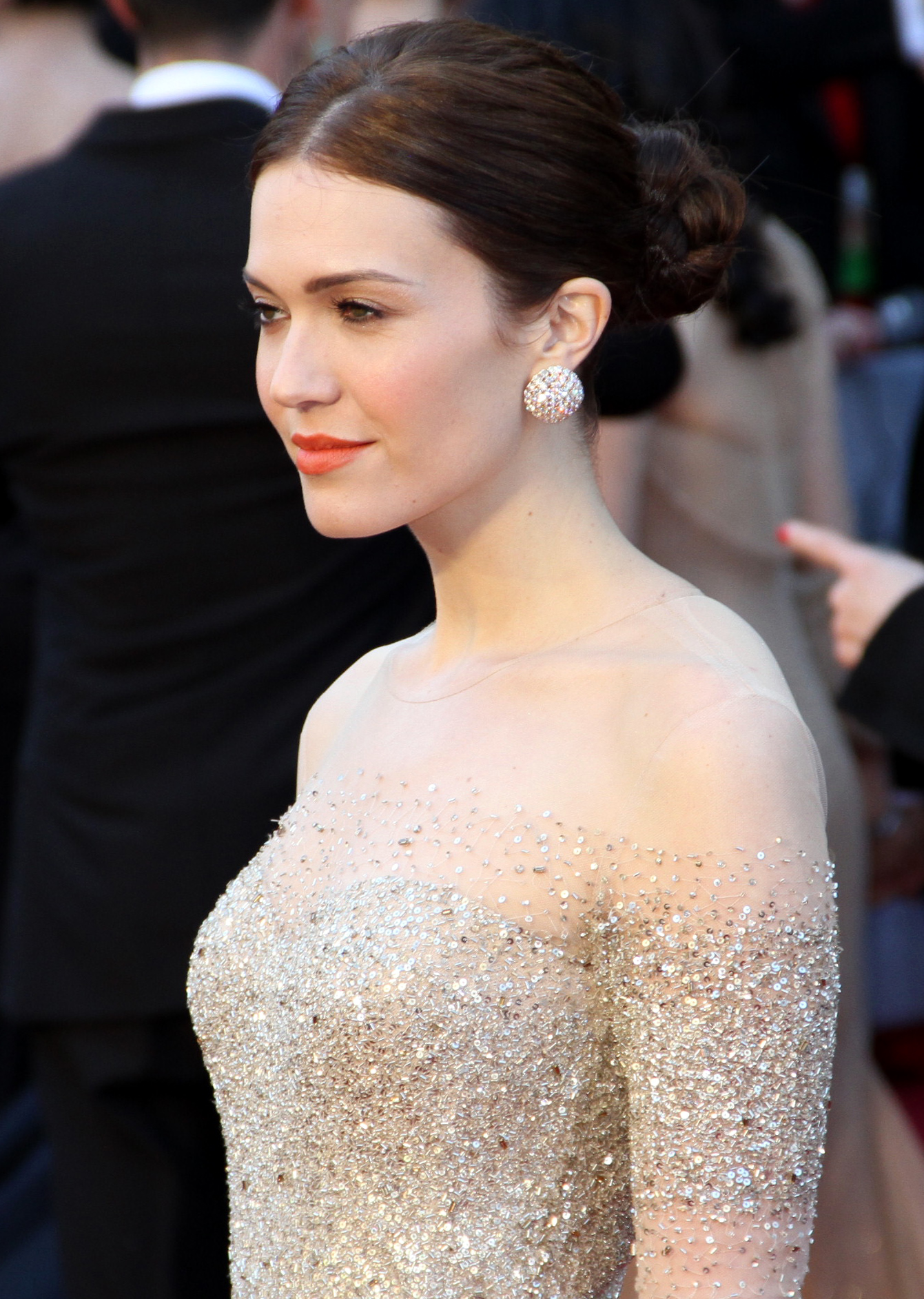
Mandy Moore guest-starred in the episode as a patient of Miranda Bailey.

The episode was written by showrunner Shonda Rhimes and directed by Rob Corn. In an interview, Rhimes told that the writing of the two-part season six finale caused her struggle. She elaborated on this:

It hurt to write this finale. It literally hurt me. Because in order to write these episodes, I had to walk in the shoes of [the shooter]. I had to think like a shooter. A person who would shoot Reed and Alex and Charles. A person who would shoot Derek. By the time I finished writing part one, I was sick. And depressed. Because my McDreamy was lying on my beloved catwalk dying. Mer is screaming and he is dying. And, before you have me shot up with Thorazine and placed in a strait jacket, yes, I DO I know it's only a TV show, I'm not insane, but dude…it felt too real. It felt WAY too real.

TV Guide reported that Mandy Moore will check into Grey's Anatomy's two-hour season finale, adding, "She'll play a patient named Mary as part of an explosive – and, of course, top-secret – cliffhanger. Bailey – who's having one hell of a season as a newly single gal – will be her doctor, but beyond that, details are being kept under heavily guarded wraps." The news was later confirmed by Entertainment Weekly which further reported, "Bailey – who's having one hell of a season as a newly single gal – will be her doctor, but beyond that, details are being kept under heavily guarded wraps. She comes as part of a grand tradition of recognizable names as patients, usually quick, juicy roles like Sara Gilbert's euthanized patient two weeks ago and Demi Lovato's upcoming stretch as a schizophrenic. Moore did that other hospital show, Scrubs."

It was also reported that a veteran actor Michael O'Neill would reprise his role as the grief-stricken widower Gary Clark. O'Neill later in an interview said, "That role changed my career. It was probably the hardest job I've ever done, hardest work I've ever done. I had a tremendous resistance to it, and I almost turned the role down. I was so afraid of that being sensationalized, and I didn't want that in the world. I hadn't worked with Shonda Rhimes, and so I didn't know. I certainly knew she was a brilliant writer, but I didn't know what the intent was. We had a conversation about it. I said, 'You know what? Can I think about this and call you back tomorrow?' I called her back, and I said, 'Shonda, I just have to say it frightens me. It really frightens me.' She said, 'Michael, it frightens me too.' I thought, OK, we're at least starting at the same place. Her writing was so good. ... We saw the wound. We got to see the wound that drove him mad, and I think that was terribly important. It was important to show the fracture that brought this man to that desperate action."

== Reception ==
=== Broadcast ===
Death And All His Friends was originally broadcast on the American Broadcasting Company (ABC) in the United States on May 20, 2010. The episode was the second half of the two-hour season six finale, the other half being Sanctuary It had an audience in The United States of 16.13 million viewers (5.9/17 Nielsen rating in its 9:00 Eastern time-slot.

=== Reviews ===
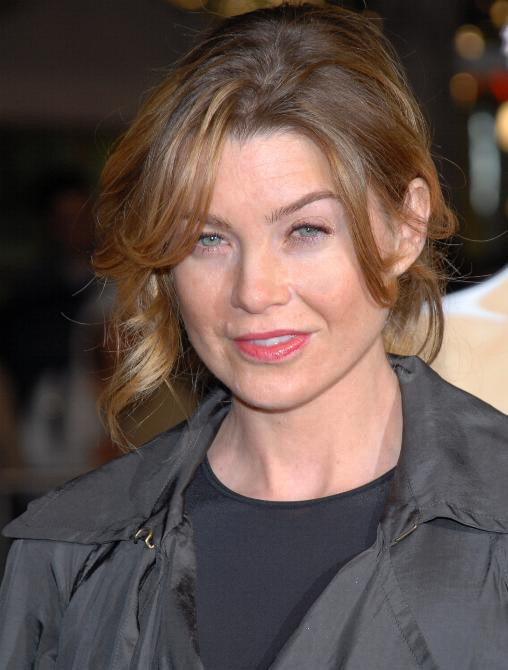
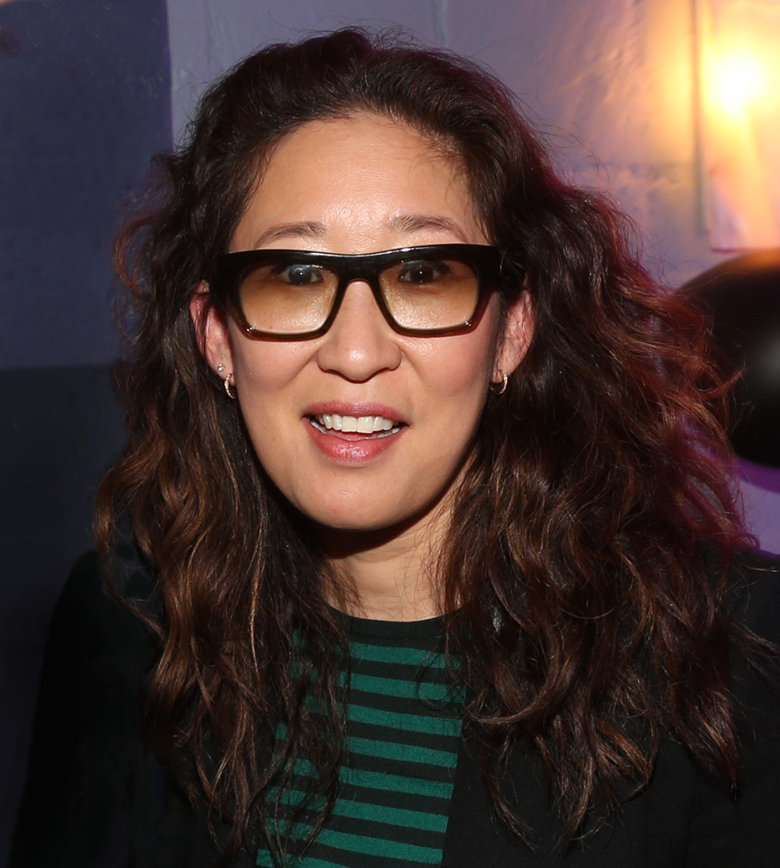
Ellen Pompeo (left) and Sandra Oh (right) garnered widespread critical acclaim for their performances as Meredith Grey and Cristina Yang

Critics praised the writing and the performances of the cast. The performances of guest stars Mandy Moore and Michael O'Neill along with Ellen Pompeo, Sandra Oh, Chandra Wilson, Kevin McKidd, James Pickens, Jr. and Sarah Drew garnered most praise. Marsi from TVFanatic highly praised the episode and gave it five out of five, and expressed that it may have been the best episode of the series, adding, "The writing and acting were absolutely stellar, and may lead to many Emmy nominations, but even more impressively, despite a killing spree, it remained distinctly Grey's. Some of the back-and-forths between the characters were truly memorable, and some of the developments so heartbreaking that we don't even know where to begin now. Seriously, the Season 6 finale left us laying awake afterward thinking about everything, a feeling we haven't had from Grey's in years and rarely achieved by any program."

John Kubicek of BuddyTV also noted that the finale was the best episode, adding, "[It was] two of the best hours of television all year. It was certainly the best Grey's Anatomy has ever been, which is saying a lot since I'd written the show off for the past few years. No show does a big traumatic event like Grey's, and the shooter gave the show license for heightened drama with five major characters being shot over the two hours. It was emotional, expertly paced and had me in tears for most of the finale." PopSugar called it "most intense episodes of Grey's I have ever seen" adding, "What a whopper of an episode! Can we talk about how gripping the scene is where Bailey and Percy are hiding from Mr. Clark? Then he turns around and gets Karev right in the chest. Seriously, I haven't been so shocked by a one-two shooting spree since Michael shot Ana Lucia and Libby in rapid succession on Lost. Another review from BuddyTV called the finale "game-changing!" stating, "The finale that changes everything! You don't want to miss it! To her credit GA creator and writer-of-this-episode Shonda Rhimes pretty much delivered on her promise. I found myself with my heart in my mouth for the entire evening before finally being able to exhale as the credits rolled." The review lauded Ellen Pompeo and Sandra Oh adding, "'The Twisted Sisters' really were the showcase of the entire finale. Meredith, sidelined for much of the season, took center stage", even calling Oh's Cristina Yang a "rockstar".

Entertainment Weekly wrote, "You're still pondering how Grey's can still be so damn good sometimes," further hugely praising the episode, "They did a bang-up job, it felt real in every way, thanks to some stellar performances and writing. And yet it maintained its Grey's-ness thanks to some quieter moments and plenty of witty exchanges to boot." Regarding the Bailey-Mary-Charles sequence the site wrote, "the action felt so real", but added, "But the most intense action was culminating in the OR with Cristina, Meredith and April had a nice moment sitting on the ground together, Meredith stone-faced and April sniffling. Kevin McKidd did some stellar acting as he interacted with them." Talking about Meredith's miscarriage the site added, "She saved Owen, though she did it while having a miscarriage — again, leave it to Grey's to make this the least dramatic, most underplayed storyline of the night. (Brilliantly so!)"

Spoiler Junkie wrote highly of the episode Meredith Grey in particular saying, "In the most heart-wrenching moment of the entire two-hour season finale, Meredith bursts into the room, asking Clark to kill her. Eye for an eye, she says. She's Lexie's sister. She's like a daughter to Weber. She's the Chief's wife." and noted that "This was an amazing season finale, one of the best in the six seasons of Grey's Anatomy. The second hour of the Grey's Anatomy Season 6 season finale, "Death and All His Friends", is even more intense than the first." HitFix also lauded the episode and wrote, "In every sense, these two episodes where Shonda Rhimes, directors Stephen Cragg and Rob Corn, and the entire cast and crew of the show are 'Going For It'. There was no opportunity for suspense, or tears, or anger, or horror, or some good old-fashioned monologuing left unexplored. Huge stakes, huge emotions, great performances from everybody Chandra Wilson and Sandra Oh were particularly great, as was Michael O'Neill as shooter Gary Clark. This was about as good as I've ever seen Grey's. Episodes like these are what I point to when anyone asks me why I'm still watching

The site also lauded Ellen Pompeo's character stating, "Meredith would suffer a miscarriage in the middle of patching up Owen Hunt's bullet wound - and be so hardcore, just as her best friend was next door in risking death to save Meredith's man, that she would just keep working even as blood dripped down her legs. A moment like that works only if everyone involved is 100% committed to the insanity of it, and here everyone was. They all went for it and came up with a riveting two hours of TV. At the completion of season 11, Wired named the episode in its must-watch list adding, "The show reaches its dramatic apex in a multi-episode arc about a deadly spree shooter who visits the hospital with a vendetta. The repercussions of this incident will echo through most of season 7, and well into the future." The site also called Pompeo's 'Shoot Me. I'm Your Eye for an Eye.' the best scene from the entire series.
