= NAACP Image Award for Outstanding Directing in a Drama Series =

American television award

This article lists the winners and nominees for the NAACP Image Award for Outstanding Directing in a Drama Series. The award was first given during the 2006 ceremony and since its inception, Paris Barclay; Ernest R. Dickerson; and Carl Franklin hold the record for the most wins with two each.

== Winners and nominees ==
Winners are listed first and highlighted in bold.

=== 2000s ===
Year	Director	Series	Episode	Ref
2006
2006	**Paris Barclay**	**Cold Case**	**N/A**	
2006	Philip G. Atwell	The Shield	—N/a	
2006	Janice Cooke	Charmed	—N/a	
2006	Janice Cooke	One Tree Hill	—N/a	
2006	Janice Cooke	Summerland	—N/a	
2007
2007	**Karen Gaviola**	**Lost**	**"The Whole Truth"**	
2007	Paris Barclay	Cold Case	"Saving Sammy"	
2007	Anthony Hemingway	Close to Home	"Prodigal Son"	
2007	Seith Mann	The Wire	"Homerooms"	
2007	Craig Ross Jr.	Bones	"Aliens in a Spaceship"	
2008
2008	**Seith Mann**	**Friday Night Lights**	**"Are You Ready For Friday Night"**	
2008	Paris Barclay	CSI: Crime Scene Investigation	"Meet Market"	
2008	Roxann Dawson	Heroes	"Run!"	
2008	Kevin Hooks	Lincoln Heights	"Pilot"	
2008	Darnell Martin	Law & Order: Criminal Intent	"Bombshell"	
2009
2009	**Ernest R. Dickerson**	**Lincoln Heights**	**"The Day Before Tomorrow"**	
2009	Paris Barclay	In Treatment	"Alex-Week 8"	
2009	Anthony Hemingway	Heroes	"Chapter Five: Angels & Monsters"	
2009	Eriq La Salle	Law & Order: Special Victims Unit	"PTSD"	
2009	Seith Mann	The Wire	"The Dickensian Aspect"	

=== 2010s ===
Year	Director	Series	Episode	Ref
2010
2010	**Chandra Wilson**	**Grey's Anatomy**	**"Give Peace a Chance"**	
2010	Paris Barclay	CSI: Crime Scene Investigation	"Coup de Grace"	
2010	Ernest R. Dickerson	Dexter	"Road Kill"	
2010	Edward James Olmos	Battlestar Galactica	"Islanded in a Stream of Stars"	
2010	Kevin Sullivan	Lincoln Heights	"Home Again"	
2011
2011	**Millicent Shelton**	**Men of a Certain Age**	**"Go with the Flow"**	
2011	Félix Enríquez Alcalá	Southland	"What Makes Sammy Run?"	
2011	Paris Barclay	In Treatment	"Sunil: Week 6"	
2011	Seith Mann	Friday Night Lights	"Injury List"	
2011	Stephen Williams	Undercovers	"Instructions"	
2012
2012	**Ernest R. Dickerson**	**Treme**	**"Do Watcha Wanna"**	
2012	Paris Barclay	Sons of Anarchy	"Out"	
2012	Seith Mann	Dexter	"Get Gellar"	
2012	Kevin Rodney Sullivan	NCIS	"Tell-All"	
2012	Ken Whittingham	Parenthood	"Opening Night"	
2013
2013	**Paris Barclay**	**Smash**	**"The Coup"**	
2013	Thomas Carter	The Mob Doctor	"Legacy"	
2013	Ernest R. Dickerson	Treme	"Don't You Leave Me Here"	
2013	Kevin Hooks	Last Resort	"Blue on Blue"	
2013	Mario Van Peebles	Boss	"Backflash"	
2014
2014	**Regina King**	**Southland**	**"Off Duty"**	
2014	Ernest R. Dickerson	Treme	"Dippermouth Blues"	
2014	Carl Franklin	House of Cards	"Chapter 11"	
2014	Rob Hardy	Criminal Minds	"Carbon Copy"	
2014	Millicent Shelton	The Fosters	"Clean"	
2015
2015	**Carl Franklin**	**House of Cards**	**"Chapter 14"**	
2015	Anton Cropper	Suits	"One-Two-Three Go..."	
2015	Hanelle Culpepper	Criminal Minds	"The Edge of Winter"	
2015	Cary Joji Fukunaga	True Detective	"Who Goes There?"	
2015	Millicent Shelton	The Divide	"And the Little Ones Get Caught"	
2016
2016	**John Ridley**	**American Crime**	**"Episode 1"**	
2016	Salim Akil	Being Mary Jane	"Sparrow"	
2016	Lee Daniels	Empire	"Pilot"	
2016	Ernest R. Dickerson	Hand of God	"Welcome the Stranger"	
2016	Millicent Shelton	American Crime	Episode 10	
2017
2017	**John Singleton**	**The People v. O. J. Simpson: American Crime Story**	**"The Race Card"**	
2017	Paris Barclay	Pitch	"Pilot"	
2017	Sam Esmail	Mr. Robot	"eps2.5_h4ndshake.sme"	
2017	Anthony Hemingway	Underground	"The Macon 7"	
2017	Millicent Shelton	Empire	"The Lyon Who Cried Wolf"	
2018
2018	**Carl Franklin**	**13 Reasons Why**	**"Tape 5, Side B"**	
2018	Jeffrey Byrd	Switched at Birth	"Occupy Truth"	
2018	Jonathan Demme	Shots Fired	"Hour Six: The Fire This Time"	
2018	Ernest R. Dickerson	The Deuce	"Show and Prove"	
2018	Gina Prince-Bythewood	Shots Fired	"Hour One: Pilot"	
2019
2019	**Deborah Chow**	**Better Call Saul**	**"Something Stupid"**	
2019	Ayoka Chenzira	Queen Sugar	"Here Beside the River"	
2019	Dee Rees	Philip K. Dick's Electric Dreams	"Kill All Others"	
2019	Salli Richardson-Whitfield	Luke Cage	"I Get Physical"	
2019	Zetna Fuentes	How to Get Away with Murder	"Lahey v. Commonwealth of Pennsylvania"	

=== 2020s ===
Year	Director	Series	Episode	Ref
2020
2020	**Curtis "50 Cent" Jackson**	**Power**	**"Forgot About Dre"**	
2020	Ava DuVernay	When They See Us	"Part Four"	
2020	Carl H. Seaton, Jr.	Snowfall	"Hedgehogs"	
2020	Debbie Allen	Grey's Anatomy	"Silent All These Years"	
2020	Jet Wilkinson	The Chi	"The Scorpion and the Frog"	
2021
2021	**Hanelle Culpepper**	**Star Trek: Picard**	**"Remembrance"**	
2021	Cheryl Dunye	Lovecraft Country	"Strange Case"	
2021	Misha Green	Lovecraft Country	"Jig-a-Bobo"	
2021	Nzingha Stewart	Little Fires Everywhere	"The Uncanny"	
2021	Steve McQueen	Small Axe	Mangrove	
2022
2022	**Barry Jenkins**	**The Underground Railroad**	**"Indiana Winter"**	
2022	Hanelle Culpepper	True Story	"Like Cain Did Abel"	
2022	Anthony Hemingway	Genius: Aretha	"Respect"	
2022	Carl Seaton	Snowfall	"Fight or Flight"	
2022	Carl Seaton	Godfather of Harlem	"The Bonanno Split"	
2024	**Dawn Wilkinson**	**Power Book II: Ghost**	**"Sacrifice"**	

== Multiple wins and nominations ==
=== Wins ===
2 wins

- Paris Barclay
- Ernest R. Dickerson
- Carl Franklin

=== Nominations ===
9 nominations

- Paris Barclay

7 nominations

- Ernest R. Dickerson

5 nominations

- Seith Mann
- Millicent Shelton

4 nominations

- Anthony Hemingway

3 nominations

- Janice Cooke
- Hanelle Culpepper
- Carl Franklin

2 nominations

- Kevin Hooks
- Carl Seaton
- Kevin Sullivan
