= Invest in Love =

- Grey's Anatomy episode
- Episode no.: Season 6 Episode 8
- Directed by: Jessica Yu
- Written by: Stacy McKee
- Original air date: November 5, 2009
- Running time: 43 minutes

Episode chronology
← Previous "Give Peace a Chance"	Next → "New History"
- Grey's Anatomy season 6

"Invest in Love" is the eighth episode of the sixth season of the American television medical drama Grey's Anatomy, and the 110th episode overall. Written by Stacy McKee and directed by Jessica Yu, the episode aired on the American Broadcasting Company (ABC) in the United States on November 5, 2009.

The episode focuses on Arizona Robbins (Jessica Capshaw) as she is faced with a $25 million donation from the parents of her longtime patient to ensure his care. Alex Karev (Justin Chambers) uses unconventional methods to stabilize a premature baby, while Cristina Yang (Sandra Oh) grows frustrated with her lack of surgical opportunities. Callie Torres (Sara Ramirez) grapples with her insecurities about asking for a permanent attending position.

Although set in Seattle, Washington, the episode was filmed primarily in Los Angeles, California. Katherine Heigl (Izzie Stevens) was absent due to filming the romantic comedy Life as We Know It (2010).

Upon its initial airing, "Invest in Love" was viewed by 13.95 million people and garnered a 5.1/13 Nielsen rating/share in the 18–49 demographic, ranking #3 for the night. The episode received positive reviews from critics, with high praise directed towards Capshaw's performance.

== Plot ==
The episode opens with a voice-over narration from Meredith Grey (Ellen Pompeo), highlighting the emotional weight and responsibility surgeons carry, particularly when treating children.

Arizona Robbins (Jessica Capshaw) is stunned when the parents of her long-term patient, Wallace Anderson (Khamani Griffin), offer the hospital a $25 million donation to ensure their son receives the best possible care. Wallace, a young boy with a chronic illness, has been under Arizona's care for years, and she feels a personal connection to him and his family. Despite the high stakes of the donation, Arizona remains optimistic about Wallace's condition and agrees to perform a critical surgery that she hopes will save his life. However, during the procedure, complications arise, and despite Arizona's best efforts, Wallace dies on the operating table, which leaves her devastated and guilt-ridden.

Alex Karev (Justin Chambers) is assigned to care for a premature baby, using an unconventional method of skin-to-skin contact, known as kangaroo care, to help stabilize the infant. Shirtless, Alex holds the baby to his chest, attempting to save the child when all other medical options have been exhausted.

Cristina Yang (Sandra Oh) grows increasingly frustrated with her lack of surgical opportunities and tries to secure a spot on Arizona's surgery. Determined to prove herself, she pushes to be more involved in the case, but Arizona, already dealing with the pressure of Wallace's surgery and the hospital's donation, brushes off Cristina's efforts. This leaves Cristina feeling sidelined and increasingly desperate to secure a permanent role in high-stakes surgeries.

Callie Torres (Sara Ramirez) is nervous about asking Chief Richard Webber (James Pickens Jr.) for a permanent position as an attending surgeon. Feeling the pressure of the impending merger with Mercy West, Callie struggles with self-doubt but finds support in her girlfriend, Arizona, who encourages her to be confident. However, Callie's anxiety over her future at the hospital lingers as she weighs the risks of putting herself forward for the role.

As Izzie Stevens (Katherine Heigl) is absent from the hospital, Alex struggles with the emotional toll of his personal life. Meanwhile, Lexie Grey (Chyler Leigh) and Mark Sloan (Eric Dane) deal with their own challenges as they assist in the hospital's various surgeries.

== Production ==
The episode was written by Stacy McKee and directed by Jessica Yu. Jenny Barak edited the music, and Donald Lee Harris served as production designer. Katherine Heigl (Izzie Stevens) was absent, as she was filming the romantic comedy Life as We Know It (2010). In the episode, Alex Karev (Justin Chambers) holds a baby shirtless to help medically stabilize him. McKee explained, "Alex's story came from cases I'd been reading about where doctors had done everything medically possible, but the babies just weren't strong enough to rally." She also revealed that the surprise party in the episode was "based on a true Grey's story," inspired by a surprise baby shower for writer Krista Vernoff.

== Release ==
"Invest in Love" was originally broadcast on November 5, 2009, in the United States on the American Broadcasting Company (ABC). The episode performed slightly below the previous installment, drawing 13.95 million viewers, a small drop from the prior episode's 14.13 million viewers. It ranked #3 for the night, behind CBS' CSI: Crime Scene Investigation and The Mentalist. While not the top-rated show of the evening, "Invest in Love" secured a 5.1/13 Nielsen rating in the 18–49 demographic, holding strong in its time slot and outperforming several competing shows. However, this rating was a slight decrease from the previous episode's 5.4/14 rating/share.

== Reception ==
"Invest in Love" received positive reviews from critics, with high praise directed towards Jessica Capshaw's performance as Arizona Robbins.

Entertainment Weekly's Jennifer Armstrong gave a positive review of the episode, calling it an "emotional buildup" and stating, "Even Grey's Anatomy itself knew it had reclaimed its name with this one." Michael Pascua of HuffPost was also favorable, noting that the episode "showed that Grey's can be strong without having a Grey sister (or Izzie Stevens (Katherine Heigl)) involved." Steve Marsi of TV Fanatic echoed this sentiment, adding that the absence of Meredith Grey (Ellen Pompeo) and Derek Shepherd (Patrick Dempsey) relationship didn't detract from the episode and praising the dynamic between Arizona and Callie Torres (Sara Ramirez), saying, "They're just a great, believable, and enjoyable couple to watch on screen."
