= Give Peace a Chance (disambiguation) =

"Give Peace a Chance" is a 1969 song by John Lennon and the Plastic Ono Band.

Give Peace a Chance may also refer to:

- "Give Peace a Chance", a song by Leon Russell from Leon Russell, 1970
- "Give Peace a Chance" (Grey's Anatomy), an episode of Grey's Anatomy
- "Give Peace a Chance" (Trailer Park Boys), an episode of Trailer Park Boys

== See also ==
- Give Peas a Chance
