= Give Peace a Chance (Grey's Anatomy) =

- Grey's Anatomy episode
- Episode no.: Season 6 Episode 7
- Directed by: Chandra Wilson
- Written by: Peter Nowalk
- Original air date: October 29, 2009
- Running time: 43 minutes

Guest appearances
- Mark Saul as Dr. Steve Mostow; Nora Zehetner as Dr. Reed Adamson; Jesse Williams as Dr. Jackson Avery; Faran Tahir as Isaac

Episode chronology
← Previous "I Saw What I Saw"	Next → "Invest in Love"
- Grey's Anatomy season 6

"Give Peace a Chance" is the seventh episode of the sixth season of the American television medical drama Grey's Anatomy, and the 109th episode overall. Written by Peter Nowalk and directed by Chandra Wilson, the episode aired on the American Broadcasting Company (ABC) in the United States on October 29, 2009.

The episode centers on Derek Shepherd (Patrick Dempsey) as he defies the orders of Chief of Surgery Richard Webber (James Pickens Jr.) to perform an operation on a hospital technician's "inoperable" tumor. Katherine Heigl (Izzie Stevens) was absent due to filming the romantic comedy Life as We Know It (2010).

Though fictionally set in Seattle, Washington, the episode was filmed primarily in Los Angeles, California. Mark Saul, Jesse Williams, and Nora Zehetner returned as guest stars, while Faran Tahir made his only appearance.

Upon its initial airing, "Give Peace a Chance" was watched by 13.74 million viewers and garnered a 5.2/13 Nielsen rating/share in the 18–49 demographic, ranking #4 for the night. The episode received mixed-to-positive reviews from television critics, with praise directed towards Tahir's performance.

Wilson's directorial work in the episode won the NAACP Image Award for Outstanding Directing in a Drama Series at the 2010 ceremony.

== Plot ==
The episode opens with a voice-over narration from Derek Shepherd (Patrick Dempsey), emphasizing the fleeting nature of peace and the importance of recognizing and embracing it when it happens.

Seattle Grace Mercy West Hospital's Chief of Surgery, Richard Webber (James Pickens Jr.), implements a new computerized surgical scheduling system, which is met with dissatisfaction from the hospital staff. Isaac (Faran Tahir), a hospital lab technician, presents Derek with scans of an "inoperable" tumor, which several doctors have refused to operate on due to its complexity. Isaac asks Shepherd to take on the surgery, and though Webber denies permission due to the high risk, Shepherd defies him and schedules the surgery anyway.

The interns and residents eagerly compete for the rare opportunity to assist Derek in the operating room. Cristina Yang (Sandra Oh) expects to win, but Jackson Avery (Jesse Williams) secures the spot after a competition. Lexie Grey (Chyler Leigh), excluded from the contest, is assigned to assist Derek throughout the long surgery, impressing Cristina by wearing a diaper to avoid leaving the OR.

Meanwhile, Izzie Stevens (Katherine Heigl) misses her scheduled Interleukin 2 cancer treatment, leaving Alex Karev (Justin Chambers) distraught. Derek spends 10 hours in the OR analyzing the tumor, supported by Mark Sloan (Eric Dane), Miranda Bailey (Chandra Wilson), and Callie Torres (Sara Ramirez). Despite Webber's orders to stop the surgery, Isaac convinces Derek to continue, leading Derek to plan the next steps overnight.

The following day, Derek, backed by his colleagues, operates again, ignoring Webber's authority. After successfully removing the tumor, Shepherd faces the potential paralysis of Isaac but makes the correct decision with a game of "Eeny, meeny, miny, moe". Though the surgery is a success, Webber angrily fires Derek, who takes the news lightly and celebrates with champagne at home with his wife, Meredith Grey (Ellen Pompeo).

== Production ==
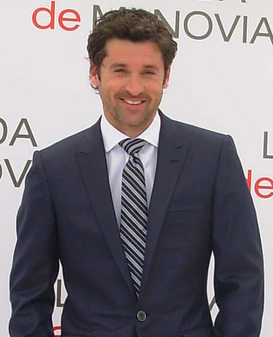
Peter Nowalk intended the episode to revolve around Patrick Dempsey's character, Derek Shepherd.

Running for 43 minutes, the episode was written by Peter Nowalk and directed by Chandra Wilson, who also portrays Miranda Bailey. Jenny Barak edited the music, and Donald Lee Harris served as the production designer. Katherine Heigl, who plays Izzie Stevens, was absent due to filming the romantic comedy Life as We Know It (2010). The episode featured the song "Moon and Moon" by Bat for Lashes, and saw the return of Mark Saul, Nora Zehetner and Jesse Williams as Steve Mostow, Reed Adamson and Jackson Avery respectively, while Faran Tahir made his first and only appearance as Isaac.

The operating room scenes were filmed at The Prospect Studios in Los Feliz, Los Angeles. Nowalk mentioned that these scenes were technically challenging to shoot. Ellen Pompeo's appearances as Meredith Grey were limited, as she was eight-and-a-half months pregnant during filming.

Nowalk revealed that the idea of Lexie Grey (Chyler Leigh) wearing a diaper during surgery was inspired by an episode of The Oprah Winfrey Show, noting that the "hardcore" nature of the doctors made it a fitting choice. He described the episode as an "experiment" focused on Derek Shepherd (Patrick Dempsey), with Isaac's storyline inspired by a real neurosurgeon, Robert Bray. Nowalk credited Wilson's directorial skills, praising her versatility as an actress, singer, and director. Much of the episode involved Shepherd contemplating his patient's tumor, which was central to the plot. Nowalk offered his insight on this:

"It's quieter than a typical episode. More single-minded. Derek is our sole focus. And really, what an amazing character to spend an entire episode with. Watch Patrick Dempsey on your screen and you can't help but be struck by how much he says without saying anything. The guy can pretty much give you an entire soliloquy with just one look. That's a rare talent, and we really wanted to use that to our advantage in an episode about stillness and peace."

— Peter Nowalk, Grey Matter

== Release ==
"Give Peace a Chance" was originally broadcast on October 29, 2009, in the United States on the American Broadcasting Company (ABC). The episode underperformed compared to the previous installment, "I Saw What I Saw", drawing 13.74 million viewers, a 1.66% decrease from the 15.04 million viewers of the prior episode. It ranked #4 for the night, behind Game 2 of the 2009 World Series, CBS's CSI and The Mentalist. While it didn't top overall viewership, the episode secured a 5.2/13 Nielsen rating in the 18–49 demographic, ranking second in its time slot and for the night, losing only to the World Series but surpassing CSI, The Mentalist, and Private Practice. However, the rating was a decline from the previous episode's 5.6/14 rating/share.

== Reception ==
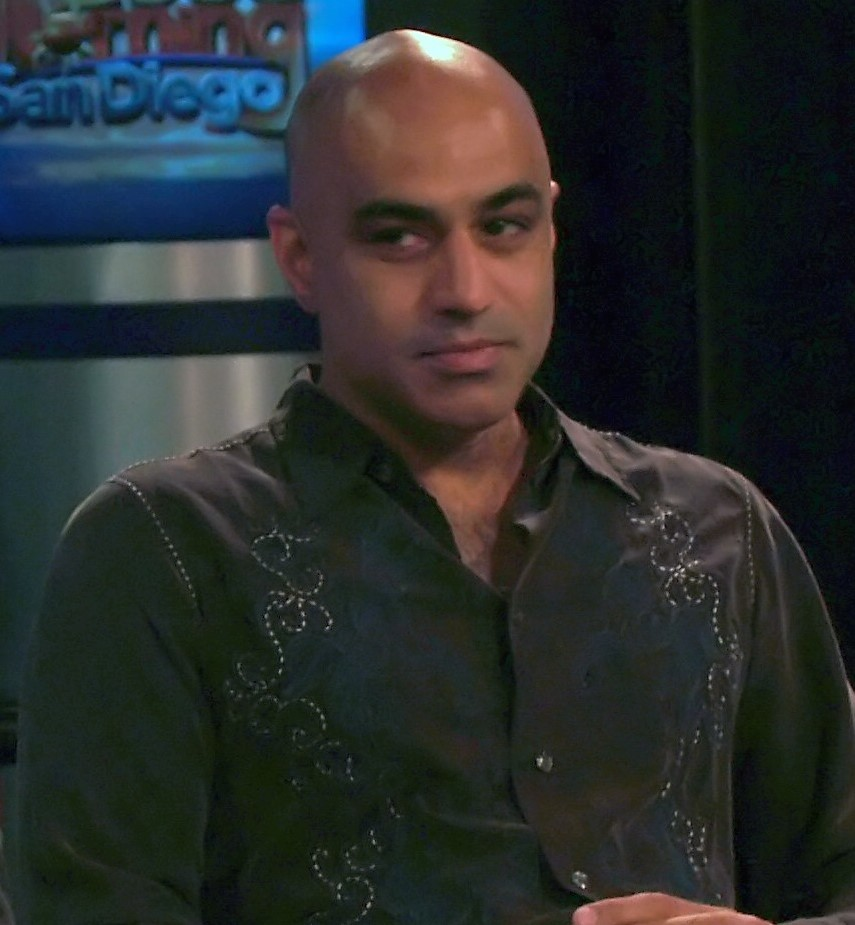
Faran Tahir's performance as Isaac received praise

"Give Peace a Chance" received mixed-to-positive reviews from television critics upon telecast, with praise directed towards Faran Tahir's performance as Isaac.

HuffPost's Michael Pascua described the episode as a "hit-and-miss", criticizing the slang dialogue as sounding like it "came from an MTV drama" but praising its "character-driven development". He was particularly positive about the development of Tahir's character, Isaac, hoping for his return to "remind these people about patience and hope."

TV Fanatic's Steve Marsi gave the episode a positive review, saying it "won [him] over," while praising Tahir's character and the growth of Patrick Dempsey's character, Derek Shepherd, calling him "the best [doctor]." He also noted that Chandra Wilson’s directing might earn her an Primetime Emmy Award nomination.

Jennifer Armstrong of Entertainment Weekly offered mixed feedback, criticizing the constant focus on medical cases but enjoying moments like Derek drawing on the wall and finding Tahir's character "lovely." Armstrong felt the episode veered into "ER territory," commenting that she doesn't watch Grey's Anatomy for an ER fix.

TV Guide's Adam Bryant appreciated the episode more than the previous one, though he disliked the potential romantic storyline between Alex Karev (Justin Chambers) and Reed Adamson (Nora Zehetner). He concluded that the episode "proves that Meredith Grey (Ellen Pompeo) doesn't have to do all the heavy lifting on this show."

People's Carrie Bell praised the episode's balance of cast members and described Isaac, Tahir's character, as "beloved", appreciating the teamwork displayed in the episode. Former The Star-Ledger editor Alan Sepinwall also gave a positive review, applauding the shift in themes and Derek's character growth.

Glenn Diaz of BuddyTV found the episode comical, calling Arizona Robbins' (Jessica Capshaw) confrontation with Richard Webber (James Pickens Jr.) "hilarious" and referring to Cristina Yang (Sandra Oh) as the episode's "comic relief". An AfterEllen senior editor humorously suggested that Derek and Webber's constant arguments should be resolved with "Seriously, these two need to drop their pants and get it over with."

== Awards ==
Chandra Wilson's directorial work in the episode won the NAACP Image Award for Outstanding Directing in a Drama Series at the 2010 ceremony.

Peter Nowalk's writing of the episode earned a nomination for a Humanitas Prize in the 60 Minute Category.
