= Accidental Friendship =

- Written by: Anna Sandor
- Directed by: Don McBrearty
- Starring: Chandra Wilson; Ben Vereen
- Country of origin: United States
- Original language: English

Production
- Running time: 91 minutes
- Production company: Automatic Pictures

Original release
- Network: Hallmark Channel
- Release: November 15, 2008

Accidental Friendship is a 2008 Hallmark Channel original film directed by Don McBrearty, and written by Anna Sandor based on a true story. It stars Chandra Wilson and Ben Vereen.

== Plot ==
Homeless woman Yvonne Caldwell (Chandra Wilson) is a woman with good reason to be bitter: she has lost everything except her two beloved dogs, Bebe and Man-Man. With her one friend, Wes (Ben Vereen), Caldwell lives the daily struggle of being homeless in Los Angeles until a chance encounter caused by her dogs leads to a friendship with LAPD officer Tami Baumann (Kathleen Munroe), and hope for a better life begins in earnest for Yvonne. Friendship between the two women seemed improbable, but their friendship provided a base of support and respect for Yvonne and Tami for more than five years.

== Cast ==
- Chandra Wilson as Yvonne Caldwell
- Kathleen Munroe as Tami Baumann
- Ben Vereen as Wesley "Wes" Smith
- Gabriel Hogan as Kevin Brawner
- Alison Sealy-Smith as Tami's colleague and friend

== True story ==
In real life, Yvonne Caldwell met Officer Tami Baumann, an officer at LAPD’s 77th Street Division, in 2003. It was Yvonne’s three dogs that caught Tami’s attention, and the overwhelming care she took of the strays. Tami, who was well known in the department for her love of animals – and who had been finding homes for strays since she was a child – used this connection to form a bond with Yvonne.

Over time, Yvonne began to open up to Tami, relating her gradual fall into poverty, a tale of struggling with abuse and abandonment which led to a long battle with alcoholism. By mid-2001, her prized SUV was her home and only possession, but that too was taken from her when she couldn’t afford the fees to release it from impound after it was stolen. Fortunately, Tami was eventually able to convince Yvonne to enter rehab and embark on a program designed to save her life.

== Critical reception ==
The film was generally well-received by critics. Variety stated that the director "doesn't stoop to the usual gimmicks," and called the script "thoughtful." They also thought the story was "simple" and "meaningful," and said it was "more of a character study than a message movie."

Marilyn Moss of The Hollywood Reporter gave it a milder review, stating that the film "stretches it a bit in the sentimental category," but still "holds a grip without too much effort," yet at the same time "there is hardly anything to set a spark." She also said, "When the corn doesn't get in the way of the story, this movie is believable and affecting." Chandra Wilson was praised for her portrayal as a "bitter"; Moss stated that "she easily takes hold of the frame whenever she's in it."

== Award and honors ==
Chandra Wilson was nominated for a Primetime Emmy Award for Outstanding Lead Actress in a Miniseries or Movie for her performance.
