= Grey's Anatomy season 6 =

Season of television series

Grey's Anatomy
- Season 6
- DVD cover art for the sixth season of Grey's Anatomy
- Showrunners: Krista Vernoff; Shonda Rhimes
- Starring: Ellen Pompeo; Sandra Oh; Katherine Heigl; Justin Chambers; Chandra Wilson; James Pickens Jr.; Sara Ramirez; Eric Dane; Chyler Leigh; Kevin McKidd; Jessica Capshaw; Kim Raver; Patrick Dempsey
- No. of episodes: 24

Release
- Original network: ABC
- Original release: September 24, 2009 – May 20, 2010

Season chronology
- ← Previous; Season 5 Next → Season 7

The sixth season of the American television medical drama Grey's Anatomy, commenced airing on the American Broadcasting Company (ABC) in the United States on September 24, 2009, and concluded on May 20, 2010. The season was produced by ABC Studios, in association with Shondaland Production Company and The Mark Gordon Company; the showrunner being Shonda Rhimes and head writer Krista Vernoff. Actors Ellen Pompeo, Sandra Oh, Katherine Heigl, and Justin Chambers reprised their roles as surgical residents Meredith Grey, Cristina Yang, Izzie Stevens, and Alex Karev, respectively. Heigl was released from her contract in the middle of the season, while T. R. Knight did not appear as George O'Malley, because Knight was released from his contract at the conclusion of season five. Main cast members Patrick Dempsey, Chandra Wilson, James Pickens Jr., Sara Ramirez, Eric Dane, Chyler Leigh, and Kevin McKidd also returned, while previous recurring-star Jessica Capshaw was promoted to a series-regular, and Kim Raver was given star-billing after the commencement of the season.

The season follows the story of surgical interns, residents and their competent mentors, as they experience the difficulties of the competitive careers they have chosen. It is set in the surgical wing of the fictional Seattle Grace Hospital, located in Seattle, Washington. A major storyline of the season is the characters adapting to change, as their beloved co-worker Stevens departed following the breakdown of her marriage, and fellow intern O'Malley died in the season premiere. A new cardiothoracic surgeon, Teddy Altman, is given employment at the hospital. Further storylines include Shepherd being promoted to Chief of Surgery and Seattle Grace Hospital merging with the neighboring Mercy West, which introduces several new doctors. The season culminates in a life-threatening situation when a grieving deceased patient's husband embarks on a shooting spree at the hospital, seeking revenge for his wife's death.

The series ended its sixth season with 13.26 million viewers, ranking #17 in terms of ratings, the lowest the series had ever ranked up to then. The season received mixed-to-positive critical feedback, with the season's premiere and finale given heavier critical acclaim, in contrast to the middle. The season was one of the least acclaimed in terms of awards and nominations, being the show's only season not to warrant a Primetime Emmy nomination. Despite the polarizing aspects of ratings and awards, the season managed to receive a spot on Movieline's top 10 list. Buena Vista released the season onto a DVD box-set, being made available to regions 1 and 2.

The website Screen Rant ranked the season #4 on their 2023 ranking of the 19 Grey's Anatomy seasons.

== Episodes ==
The number in the "No. overall" column refers to the episode's number within the overall series, whereas the number in the "No. in season" column refers to the episode's number within this particular season. "U.S. viewers in millions" is the number of Americans in millions who watched the episodes live. The sixth season's episodes are altogether 1032 minutes in length. Each episode of this season is named after a song.

No. overall	No. in season	Title	Directed by	Written by	Original release date	Prod. code	U.S. viewers (millions)
103	1	"Good Mourning"	Edward Ornelas	Krista Vernoff	September 24, 2009	601	17.03
Following the cliffhanger of season 5, Izzie is shown to have survived, but gets a bad wake up call: George has died. While the staff mourns George's death, Meredith and the other residents are unsure how to continue with their lives and each must learn to deal with it in their own way. George's mother asks Callie to make a decision on whether his organs will be donated, but Callie realizes she can't make the decision without Izzie, whom Alex fears is too weak to learn about George's death. Arizona treats a patient initially diagnosed with growing pains, but the patient's mother grows concerned due to the grief around the hospital. Owen and Cristina treat a patient who lost both of her arms in a speedboat accident. Cristina becomes annoyed when the patient's friends leave her alone, so she appoints Lexie to be the patient's friend, however the patient grows dissatisfied with the quality of her life and yells at Lexie. Derek is offered the position of chief of surgery by the board, and he informs Webber about their intentions. After Alex and Izzie catch Derek and Meredith consummating their marriage on the stairs of their house, Derek gives them the keys to his trailer, telling them to move there.
104	2	"Goodbye"	Bill D'Elia	Krista Vernoff	September 24, 2009	602	17.03
Cristina and Owen are finding it difficult to abstain from sex as instructed by Dr. Wyatt. Meredith and Derek consummate their marriage everywhere they go. Izzie mourns her best friend, George, after his death and she struggles with Alex's lack of intimacy. Callie begins her new job at Mercy West and her first patient is Webber after he gets involved in a car accident. Arizona continues to try and find ways to diagnose her patient's pain, after Webber refuses to consent to an expensive test. Lexie agrees to move in with Mark, but quickly becomes uneasy about his close relationship with Callie. Bailey removes Cristina from her service after she unintentionally talks a patient out of a life-saving surgery and then argues with Bailey over the decision. Webber announces Seattle Grace will be merging with Mercy West.
105	3	"I Always Feel Like Somebody's Watchin' Me"	Michael Pressman	Tony Phelan & Joan Rater	October 1, 2009	603	15.69
Bailey and Alex's abilities are challenged when their case is complicated with the addition of the patient's schizophrenic son. Cristina tries to get onto Arizona's service after she is removed from Bailey's service. Izzie returns to work with a new wig fearing that she'll lose her job. Callie and Arizona define their relationship after Callie considers moving to Portland. All the residents and interns of Seattle Grace fear for their jobs with the coming budget cuts and begin to compete in order to survive, with unfortunate consequences.
106	4	"Tainted Obligation"	Tom Verica	Jenna Bans	October 8, 2009	604	14.13
Meredith and Lexie are cross with one another when Thatcher arrives, in dire need of a liver transplant, and Meredith is the only one who is viable to donate. Mark is tired of Cristina's competitive zeal so he puts her on a case involving a man desiring a penis enlargement. Izzie sympathizes with a man dying from cancer. Alex becomes desperate to move out from Derek's trailer after he encounters a bear. Arizona becomes concerned over Callie's reluctance to ask Webber for her old job back. When she finally does ask, Webber gives her old position back.
107	5	"Invasion"	Tony Phelan	Mark Wilding	October 15, 2009	605	13.79
With Meredith on bedrest, the merger occurs. Cristina, Izzie, Lexie, and Alex, are introduced to and clash with their Mercy West counterparts and competition: Jackson Avery (Jesse Williams), Charles Percy (Robert Baker), April Kepner (Sarah Drew), and Reed Adamson (Nora Zehetner). Meanwhile, Arizona stands by an enraged Callie when her father visits her with a priest to convince her to renounce her homosexuality; also, an accident derails a patient's upcoming kidney donation, with Bailey promising to set things right. Following the kidney patient mishap, Izzie is fired from the hospital staff. Webber implicates Alex in her dismissal, causing her to leave him a Dear John letter and disappear, thus ending their relationship. Absent: Eric Dane as Mark Sloan This episode begins a patient crossover which concludes on Private Practice with "Right Here, Right Now". Chandra Wilson and patient guest star, Alexie Gilmore appear in both parts as Miranda Bailey and Sarah Freemont respectively.
108	6	"I Saw What I Saw"	Allison Liddi-Brown	William Harper	October 22, 2009	606	15.06
Following the death of a patient, all the doctors concerned with the case are interviewed in a who-dunnit style. Owen, Cristina, Bailey, Alex, Callie, Lexie, Charles, Jackson, and Reed all give their opinions, and as the story unfolds to show that April Kepner was the one whose mistake it was, she is fired, even though Derek is against it. Absent: Katherine Heigl as Izzie Stevens
109	7	"Give Peace a Chance"	Chandra Wilson	Peter Nowalk	October 29, 2009	607	13.74
Derek is asked by a hospital lab-tech, Isaac (Faran Tahir), to cure him when it turns out that he has an inoperable tumor surrounding his spine. Struggling with the impossible surgery, Derek attempts to do the impossible while he questions Webber's authority by doing the surgery, even though he was told not to by Webber. Reed sees a different side to Alex when she sees him worrying about Izzie missing her cancer treatment following her disappearance. Absent: Katherine Heigl as Izzie Stevens.
110	8	"Invest in Love"	Jessica Yu	Stacy McKee	November 5, 2009	608	13.95
Arizona is stunned when her longtime patient's parents offer the hospital a donation of twenty-five million dollars, but when her patient's condition worsens, all eyes are on her to save him. Cristina tests her relationship when she blatantly disregards Owen's orders and performs an unauthorized cardiac procedure, but after encouragement from Meredith and a kiss from Jackson, she decides to try and save it. Jackson and Reed start trying to deal with their feelings for Cristina and Alex respectively. Alex cares for a struggling newborn, after being saddled with Izzie's medical bills following her disappearance. After seeing how well Alex is performing in pediatrics, Bailey recommends it to him as a possible career option. In the wake of great grief, Arizona and Callie take their relationship to the next level. Absent: Katherine Heigl as Izzie Stevens
111	9	"New History"	Rob Corn	Allan Heinberg	November 12, 2009	609	14.87
Izzie returns with an old teacher of hers that's ill for Derek to treat and Meredith returns for her first day of work since she donated part of her liver. Alex confronts Izzie and she blames him for being fired. Webber accidentally clips his emergency patient's bile duct, causing the patient to turn yellow. Learning of this, Webber plans on leaving surgery for a while, and there is a recap of how he starts drinking again. Cristina gets a surprise gift from Owen: a cardio-goddess, Teddy Altman, however Cristina is not impressed. Meanwhile, Jackson tries to talk to Cristina about their kiss.
112	10	"Holidaze"	Robert Berlinger	Krista Vernoff	November 19, 2009	610	14.07
The holidays aren't so merry for the doctors at Seattle Grace-Mercy West hospital when Cristina suspects that something is or has been going on between her boyfriend, Owen, and his old friend, Teddy. But when Cristina confronts him over it, he confesses his love to her. Mark's teenage daughter, Sloan, arrives at the hospital and she moves in with him and Lexie. However, when he goes to ask her to leave, Sloan tells him that she's pregnant. Cristina, Teddy and Jackson treat a woman whose heart they had to remove, and try to keep her alive until a transplant is available. Derek and Arizona have to invent new medical equipment to save the life of a young boy. Bailey is stunned when her father makes rash judgments about her life and the choices she has made, finally culminating in a showdown at Meredith's Christmas dinner. Webber continues to drink, and Meredith only notices when he decides to take her under his wing and become her mentor. Absent: Katherine Heigl as Izzie Stevens
113	11	"Blink"	Randy Zisk	Debora Cahn	January 14, 2010	611	12.78
Mark flies Addison to Seattle to help with a difficult procedure on his pregnant daughter, Sloan. Owen questions Teddy's motives when she assigns Cristina the lead on a complicated surgery. Following the surgery, Teddy goes to leave, and when Cristina begs her to stay, Teddy confesses she still wants Owen to which Cristina offers him to her. Derek's suspicions are raised when Webber recruits Meredith to assist with a high profile operation on, which leads to Meredith telling him that Webber is drinking again. After seeing sexual tension between Alex and Reed, Meredith phones Izzie to tell her that Alex is moving on. The hospital is abuzz after a high-profile quarterback is admitted as a patient. Lexie sleeps with Alex after splitting with Mark following his decision to allow Sloan and her baby to move in with them. After advice from Addison and Callie, Derek attempts to set Bailey up on a date. Absent: Katherine Heigl as Izzie Stevens This episode marks the second crossover episode of the season with Private Practice. Sloan Riley (Leven Rambin) accompanies her father, Mark Sloan (Eric Dane) to LA for surgery required to save her baby's life. The arc concludes with the episode "Another Second Chance".
114	12	"I Like You So Much Better When You're Naked"	Donna Deitch	Tony Phelan & Joan Rater	January 21, 2010	612	12.70
Izzie returns, after getting a message from Meredith suggesting Alex is moving on. She spends the day at the hospital attempting to win Alex back and looking for a job in the neighborhood. Alex breaks up with Izzie because he thinks he deserves someone who won't leave him, prompting Izzie to leave, never to return. Cristina tries to understand whether she could really give up her relationship with Owen to keep Teddy as a teacher. An opera singer who doesn't want to lose his lung in place of his boyfriend, makes Cristina and Alex evaluate their relationships. Callie gets chicken pox and becomes incensed when Arizona locks her in isolation. Mark returns and tells Lexie that he slept with Addison, and she in turn tells him about sleeping with Alex, prompting him to leave her. Derek tells the board that Webber is drinking and they fire him.
115	13	"State of Love and Trust"	Jeannot Szwarc	Stacy McKee	February 4, 2010	613	12.55
As Derek begins his role as interim chief, he faces a potential lawsuit when Bailey and Meredith's patient awakens from anesthesia mid-surgery. Bailey struggles with losing the patient's trust, but is comforted by the anesthesiologist, Dr. Ben Warren. Meanwhile, Teddy refuses to place Cristina on her service, while Alex begins to invest himself in Pediatrics, leaving plastics behind. Owen and Cristina's relationship begins heating up, resulting in Cristina ignoring an urgent page from Teddy at Owen's request. As Mark refuses to speak to a heartbroken Lexie, Derek tries to convince Webber to seek treatment for his drinking, and as Webber struggles with whether to leave surgery for good, he receives guidance from Meredith and Bailey. Derek later hires April Kepner and Megan Mostow back. Absent: Katherine Heigl as Izzie Stevens
116	14	"Valentine's Day Massacre"	Stephen Cragg	William Harper	February 11, 2010	614	12.74
It's Valentine's Day and the doctors must treat dozens of injured people after the roof collapses at a popular romantic restaurant; Owen, Lexie and Jackson treat the potwash who lost his arm during the collapse. Meanwhile, Meredith and Alex get caught up in a love story between a married woman and the head waiter at the restaurant she's been visiting for 15 years. Derek tries to manage his busy schedule as Chief of Surgery; Meredith wrestles with her new duties as the Chief's wife; and Mark and Callie team up to convince Sloan to do the right thing for her baby, but she is determined to give the baby up for adoption. April tells Derek she'd rather be his assistant than a surgeon following her previous mistake. Jackson gives some advice to Lexie after her split with Mark. Callie and Arizona notice the chemistry between Bailey and Ben, and urge her to ask him out. Absent: Katherine Heigl as Izzie Stevens
117	15	"The Time Warp"	Rob Corn	Zoanne Clack	February 18, 2010	615	10.27
Previous medical cases involving Webber, Bailey and Callie are told as part of a decision from Derek as the new chief. The cases shed light on the beginnings of the affair between the Chief (played by J. August Richards) and Ellis (Sarah Paulson) in 1982, the makings of Bailey in the 2003 sequences, where viewers see Bailey in her pre-"Nazi" days and Callie shortly before she was introduced on the show. Absent: Eric Dane as Mark Sloan, Kevin McKidd as Owen Hunt, and Katherine Heigl as Izzie Stevens
118	16	"Perfect Little Accident"	Bill D'Elia	Peter Nowalk	March 4, 2010	616	11.83
Jackson Avery's relationship to the legendary Harper Avery is revealed after he is admitted to the hospital, and it creates a stir around the hospital. Cristina, along with other residents, attempt to gain his attention, while Webber and Derek are nervous about operating on Harper. Arizona tries to help Teddy move on to greener pastures when she sees how obsessed she is with Owen, while she struggles to work with Alex after learning that he'd once slept with Callie. Mark attempts to move on after giving up Sloan's baby through sex, and tells Derek and Callie he can restore a patient's hearing. Meredith tries stopping Lexie from developing feelings for Alex as they continue to have sex. Absent: Katherine Heigl as Izzie Stevens
119	17	"Push"	Chandra Wilson	Debora Cahn	March 11, 2010	617	10.94
Hunt and Webber fight and compete over a patient with a large tumor, aided by Meredith and Cristina respectively. Webber gives advice to Derek about being Chief of Surgery. Bailey struggles to let her guard down and open up to her blooming relationship with Ben. Mark tries to get back into a relationship and asks Teddy to go out on a date and Meredith notices Owen's jealousy over the situation. Teddy and Mark grow closer as they work on a patient whose heart is close to his kidneys, while Arizona and Lexie have to deal with bickering parents after their child falls ill. Callie realizes that Arizona does not want a baby as she does, leading her to question the relationship. Lexie realizes that Mark is moving on and breaks down. Absent: Katherine Heigl as Izzie Stevens
120	18	"Suicide is Painless"	Jeannot Szwarc	Tony Phelan & Joan Rater	March 25, 2010	618	11.57
Hunt has trouble sleeping and is still showing signs of PTSD. Teddy and Hunt have been asked to help a patient die with physician assisted suicide, which leads to a flashback of them in the Army where Hunt was asked by a friend to help him die. The doctors are busy with several thrill-seekers who became injured after they jumped from a helicopter. Mark is enjoying dating Teddy without having to have sex with her. Callie confides in Mark about Arizona not wanting children. Meredith shows signs of hating Derek as Chief of Surgery, as she becomes angry at Derek when she feels he stole one of her surgeries. Webber struggles to fit in with the other surgeons given his past position. Absent: Katherine Heigl as Izzie Stevens This episode marks the final credit of Heigl in the series despite her final appearance six episodes prior. She requested to be released from her contract after negotiations occurred with ABC for months regarding her commitment to the series. Originally, she was due to return for the final five episodes of the season.
121	19	"Sympathy for the Parents"	Debbie Allen	Allan Heinberg	April 1, 2010	619	9.87
Meredith and Derek begin to discuss having a child, while Teddy and Mark have sex for the first time. Alex's brother, Aaron, comes to visit, which reveals many of Alex's secrets, much to the delight of Bailey and to the annoyance of Alex. However, Alex's main concern is getting his brother surgery when he doesn't have insurance. Lexie begins to notice that April is developing a crush on Derek. Webber, April, Lexie and Derek are faced with a patient that will come to change their lives forever. Several doctors are on hand following a gunfight which wounded a police officer and three suspects, and it leads to tension erupting between Owen and Cristina. Promoted: Kim Raver as Teddy Altman as part of the main cast after previously recurring.
122	20	"Hook, Line and Sinner"	Tony Phelan	Meg Marinis	April 29, 2010	620	10.47
After Sloan has her baby, Mark wants to keep him, and asks Callie for guidance while getting some unwanted advice from Arizona. Callie and Arizona begin fighting over Arizona's desire not to have a child. Teddy starts getting worried about her job security when Derek invites a renowned cardiologist in to do a major surgery, and as Owen comforts her, they nearly kiss. Meredith begins to notice April's crush on Derek. Several surgeons are on hand when a father and son are injured in a fishing boat accident, with the father getting impaled on a shark hook. Bailey notices Lexie's subservience to Alex and encourages her to stand up for herself.
123	21	"How Insensitive"	Tom Verica	William Harper	May 6, 2010	621	11.03
Bailey preps the team with mandatory sensitivity training prior to admitting a 700-pound patient with compounded medical issues, and the case proves to be challenging in every sense of the word. Meanwhile, Derek has to come face to face with a former patient's husband in a wrongful death deposition, and spending time with a heart patient's daughter opens up some old wounds for Cristina. Owen begins treating Meredith differently when he learns she knows about his decision to not recommend Teddy for a permanent position. Meredith encourages Alex to decide on his future with Lexie. Callie's patient develops a crush on her, which doesn't go unnoticed by Charles and Lexie. Upon returning home, Callie confesses she wonders whether she'd have a baby with the patient one day, and realising they are at a crossroads with their relationship, she and Arizona split up.
124	22	"Shiny Happy People"	Edward Ornelas	Zoanne Clack & Peter Nowalk	May 13, 2010	622	11.05
An elderly patient admitted into the E.R. for a heart condition sees a familiar face: a long lost love who happens to be in the E.R. as well for a fractured arm, and the staff find themselves caught up in their love story. Meanwhile, Karev treats a troubled teenage patient called Hayley May (Demi Lovato) whose parents brought her in for schizophrenia. Meredith can't help but tell Cristina about her suspicions of Owen after he asks her to move in with him, causing Cristina to confront him about his feelings for Teddy. Teddy breaks up with Mark after discovering him in bed with Reed, leading to Mark confessing to Lexie that he still loves her. Bailey's relationship with Ben begins to heat up, and Derek and Mark figure out they're seeing each other. A burns victim is distressed when she learns she can't have a surgery meant to restore her hair.
125	23	"Sanctuary"	Stephen Cragg	Shonda Rhimes	May 20, 2010	623	15.24
126	24	"Death And All His Friends"	Rob Corn	Shonda Rhimes	May 20, 2010	624	15.24
The hospital is hit with an unprecedented crisis: a shooter is in the hospital, and making the hospital go into a lockdown. Meredith discovers that she is pregnant, while Cristina breaks up with Owen after he can't decide between her and Teddy. The shooter, Gary Clark, kills Reed Adamson and seriously wounds Alex, which leads to Lexie and Mark trying to save him. Owen and Teddy risk their lives to move their patient to the ICU. Bailey must try to save Charles with the help of her patient Mary (Mandy Moore) after he is shot, while Derek is confronted by Gary Clark, who shoots him after being interrupted by April. With the crisis unfolding, each character is put through extreme trials and tribulations. Cristina is put under pressure to save Derek, who has been shot. Arizona and Callie reinstate their relationship after Callie decides she doesn't want to have a baby if it means she can't be with Arizona, while Arizona decides she doesn't want to prevent Callie from becoming a mother. Owen realizes he loves Cristina and chooses her over Teddy, while Lexie confesses her feelings to Alex. Bailey tries to save Charles, who has been shot by Gary, but ultimately fails due to the police shutting down the hospital elevators. Gary walks into the OR where Cristina and Jackson are trying to save Derek and tells them at gunpoint to stop operating on him. Jackson disconnects the heart monitor from Derek so it looks like he is flatlining. Gary is fooled into thinking Derek has died and leaves. Unfortunately, Meredith is also fooled and the shock of thinking her husband is dead is enough to trigger a miscarriage. Gary ends up in the room his wife died in with one bullet left. Webber, realizing Gary's actions are partly his fault due to his mishandling his wife's illness, enters the room. Gary admits that his plan was to save enough bullets to kill Webber with one and himself with another, but now he doesn't know what to do. Webber says he has a choice: either kill him and go to prison or shoot himself and be reunited with his wife. Outside, a gunshot is heard and Webber grimly walks out.

== Cast and characters ==
=== Main ===
- Ellen Pompeo as Dr. Meredith Grey
- Sandra Oh as Dr. Cristina Yang
- Katherine Heigl as Dr. Izzie Stevens
- Justin Chambers as Dr. Alex Karev
- Chandra Wilson as Dr. Miranda Bailey
- James Pickens Jr. as Dr. Richard Webber
- Sara Ramirez as Dr. Callie Torres
- Eric Dane as Dr. Mark Sloan
- Chyler Leigh as Dr. Lexie Grey
- Kevin McKidd as Dr. Owen Hunt
- Jessica Capshaw as Dr. Arizona Robbins
- Kim Raver as Dr. Teddy Altman
- Patrick Dempsey as Dr. Derek Shepherd

=== Recurring ===
- Kate Walsh as Dr. Addison Montgomery
- Sarah Drew as Dr. April Kepner
- Jesse Williams as Dr. Jackson Avery
- Jason George as Dr. Ben Warren
- Nora Zehetner as Dr. Reed Adamson
- Robert Baker as Dr. Charles Percy
- Leven Rambin as Sloan Riley
- Jeff Perry as Thatcher Grey

=== Notable guests ===
- Demi Lovato as Hayley
- Sara Gilbert as Kim Allen
- Marion Ross as Betty
- Mandy Moore as Mary Portman
- Ryan Devlin as Bill Portman
- Nick Purcell as Doug
- Michael O'Neill as Gary Clark
- Danielle Panabaker as Kelsey
- Adrienne Barbeau as Jodie Crawley
- Héctor Elizondo as Carlos Torres
- Cody Christian as Brad Walker
- Mark Saul as Dr. Steve Mostow
- Martha Plimpton as Pam Michaelson
- Loretta Devine as Adele Webber
- Debra Monk as Louise O'Malley
- Mitch Pileggi as Larry Jennings
- Courtney Ford as Jill Meyer
- David Ramsey as Jimmy Thompson
- Nicole Cummins as Paramedic Nicole
- Frankie Faison as William Bailey
- Wendy Raquel Robinson as Gina Thompson
- Brandon Scott as Dr. Ryan Spalding
- Sarah Utterback as Olivia Harper
- Steven W. Bailey as Joe, the Bartender
- J. August Richards as Young Richard Webber
- Sarah Paulson as Young Ellis Grey
- Emily Bergl as Trisha
- Amy Madigan as Dr. Katherine Wyatt
- Missi Pyle as Dr. Baylow
- Joel Grey as Dr. Singer

== Production ==
=== Development and writing ===
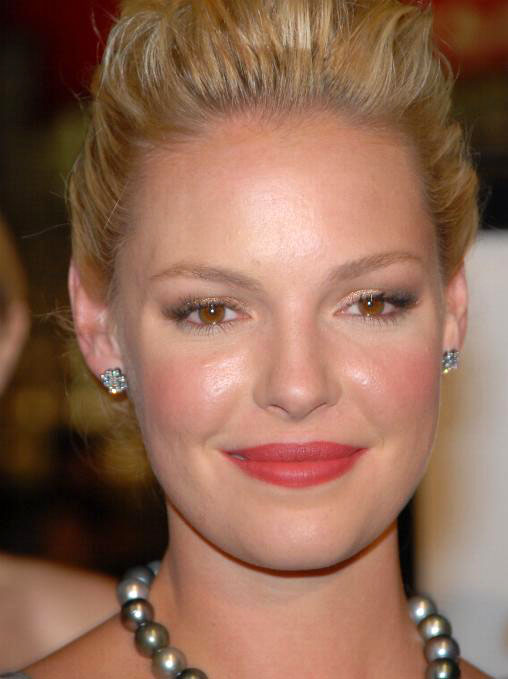
Katherine Heigl departed in the middle of the season, citing a desire to spend more time with her family.

The season was produced by Touchstone Television ABC Studios, The Mark Gordon Company, Shondaland and was distributed by Buena Vista International, Inc. The executive producers were creator Shonda Rhimes, Betsy Beers, Mark Gordon, Krista Vernoff, Rob Corn, Mark Wilding, Joan Rater and James D. Parriott. The regular directors were Shonda Rhimes, Krista Vernoff, Stacy McKee, William Harper, Debora Cahn, Allan Heinberg and Peter Nowalk. At the conclusion of season 5, T. R. Knight was released from his contract, following a disagreement with Rhimes. When asked to make a 'flashback' appearance in season six, Knight declined. Heigl's appearances in the season were sporadic, seeing Stevens depart and return twice. Although she was scheduled to appear in the final 5 episodes of the season, Heigl requested that she be released from her contract 18 months early, and made her final appearance on January 21, 2010. Heigl explained that she wanted to spend more time with her family, and did not think it would be respectful to Grey's Anatomy viewers to have Izzie return and depart yet again. The season's 2-hour opener showed the doctors of Seattle Grace Hospital, grieving the loss of their deceased friend, O'Malley. The special's writer, Vernoff, commented: "It's heartbreaking. I fell in love with George, like many of you did, in season one."

The ninth episode of the season, "New History", saw the arrival of Altman, which ended up forming a love-triangle between her, Hunt, and Yang. Raver commented on this: "She was in Iraq with Owen. She's a cardiac surgeon. She's really good at what she does. There'll be some interesting stuff between Teddy, Owen and Cristina." The episode's writer, Heinberg, offered his insight:

"Teddy's arrival at Seattle Grace unleashes all manner of complications for Owen, Cristina, and herself. Cristina's immediately suspicious that Owen and Teddy were more than friends during their time together in Iraq. Teddy confesses to Owen that she apparently misread their mutual history, and walks away from him, mortified. And Owen's left haunted by Teddy's confession, now forced to re-examine his own history -- and his feelings for both Teddy and Cristina.

— Allan Heinberg, Grey Matter

"I Like You So Much Better When You're Naked" saw the departure of Stevens, following the breakdown of her marriage with Karev. Series' writer Joan Rater commented on this: "Izzie getting the clean scan back gives Alex the freedom to leave. Because he never would have left her when she was sick, he's a good guy. And I'm not saying that Alex ever consciously thought, I can’t leave her while she's sick, but now that she's not, now that she seems like she's going to get better, it just comes to him. He deserves more. He's a good guy and he deserves more. But loving Izzie showed him that he can be good, is good. So it was a little gift. And when he tells Izzie he's done, he's not bitter or angry, he's just done."

The writing of the 2-part season 6 finale, caused struggle to Rhimes. She elaborated on this:

It hurt to write this finale. It literally hurt me. Because in order to write these episodes, I had to walk in the shoes of [the shooter]. I had to think like a shooter. A person who would shoot Reed and Alex and Charles. A person who would shoot Derek. By the time I finished writing part one, I was sick. And depressed. Because my McDreamy was lying on my beloved catwalk dying. Mer is screaming and he is dying. And, before you have me shot up with Thorazine and placed in a strait jacket, yes, I DO I know it's only a TV show, I'm not insane, but dude…it felt too real. It felt WAY too real.

=== Casting ===
The sixth season had 13 roles receiving star-billing, with 12 of them returning from the previous season, 1 of whom previously in a recurring guest capacity. The regulars portray the surgeons from the fictional Seattle Grace Hospital as new rivalries and romantic relationships begin to develop after the hospital's merger with Mercy West. Meredith Grey, a surgical resident and the protagonist of the series, is portrayed by Ellen Pompeo. Fellow third-year residents Cristina Yang, Izzie Stevens and Alex Karev are portrayed by Sandra Oh, Katherine Heigl and Justin Chambers, respectively. Attending general surgeon Miranda Bailey was portrayed by Chandra Wilson whose main storylines throughout the season focus on her divorce and the development of new romantic relationships. Seattle Grace Hospital's Chief of Surgery and general surgeon Richard Webber was portrayed by James Pickens, Jr., who returns to alcoholism after being sober for 20 years.

Sara Ramirez acted as bisexual orthopedic surgeon Callie Torres, Eric Dane played womanizer plastic surgeon Mark Sloan, Chyler Leigh portrayed Meredith's half-sister and second-year surgical resident Lexie Grey, Kevin McKidd appeared as trauma surgeon Owen Hunt, and Patrick Dempsey featured as chief of neurosurgery Derek Shepherd. After having previously appeared in a multi-episode arc in a guest-star capacity in the show's fifth season, Jessica Capshaw began receiving star-billing in the season's premiere episode in the role of attending pediatric surgeon Arizona Robbins. The ninth episode of the season marked the introduction of the new chief of cardiothoracic surgery Teddy Altman, portrayed by Kim Raver, whose mysterious romantic past with Hunt develops into one of the season's main stories. Starting with the nineteenth episode of the season, Raver began receiving star-billing.

The sixth season introduces several new recurring characters who start to develop progressive and expansive storylines throughout the season. Mercy West surgical residents Reed Adamson, Charles Percy, April Kepner and Jackson Avery were portrayed by Nora Zehetner, Robert Baker, Sarah Drew and Jesse Williams, respectively. Jason George portrayed Miranda Bailey's love-interest, anesthesiologist Ben Warren. Thatcher Grey (Jeff Perry) and Sloan Riley (Leven Rambin) have been part of the season's main story arcs, while numerous episodic characters have made guest appearances: Demi Lovato as Hayley, Sara Gilbert as Kim Allen, Marion Ross as Betty, Mandy Moore as Mary Portman, Ryan Devlin as Bill Portman, Nick Purcell as Doug, Michael O'Neill as Gary Clark, Danielle Panabaker as Kelsey, Adrienne Barbeau as Jodie Crawley, Héctor Elizondo as Mr. Torres, Cody Christian as Brad Walker, Amy Madigan as Dr. Wyatt, and Missi Pyle as Jasmine. Former series-regular Kate Walsh returned to the series as a special guest-star, portraying neonatal surgeon and obstetrician-gynecologist Addison Montgomery.

== Reception ==
=== Ratings ===
Viewership and ratings per episode of Grey's Anatomy season 6
No.	Title	Air date	Rating/share (18–49)	Viewers (millions)
1	"Good Mourning"	September 24, 2009	6.7/17	17.03
2	"Goodbye"	September 24, 2009	6.7/17	17.03
3	"I Always Feel Like Somebody's Watchin' Me"	October 1, 2009	6.1/16	15.69
4	"Tainted Obligation"	October 8, 2009	5.4/14	14.13
5	"Invasion"	October 15, 2009	5.0/13	13.79
6	"I Saw What I Saw"	October 22, 2009	5.3/14	15.06
7	"Give Peace a Chance"	October 29, 2009	5.2/13	13.74
8	"Invest in Love"	November 5, 2009	5.1/13	13.95
9	"New History"	November 12, 2009	5.6/14	14.87
10	"Holidaze"	November 19, 2009	5.1/13	14.07
11	"Blink"	January 14, 2010	4.8/13	12.78
12	"I Like You So Much Better When You're Naked"	January 21, 2010	4.7/12	12.70
13	"State of Love and Trust"	February 4, 2010	4.5/12	12.55
14	"Valentine's Day Massacre"	February 11, 2010	4.4/11	12.74
15	"The Time Warp"	February 18, 2010	3.7/9	10.27
16	"Perfect Little Accident"	March 4, 2010	4.0/11	11.83
17	"Push"	March 11, 2010	3.9/11	10.94
18	"Suicide is Painless"	March 25, 2010	3.7/10	11.57
19	"Sympathy for the Parents"	April 1, 2010	3.5/11	9.87
20	"Hook, Line and Sinner"	April 29, 2010	3.8/11	10.47
21	"How Insensitive"	May 6, 2010	3.8/11	11.03
22	"Shiny Happy People"	May 13, 2010	3.9/11	11.05
23	"Sanctuary"	May 20, 2010	5.4/15	15.24
24	"Death and All His Friends"	May 20, 2010	5.4/15	15.24

The sixth season opened up to 17.04 million viewers with a 6.7/17 Nielsen rating/share in the 18–49 demographic. Although the rating was a 1% decrease from season five's opener, it managed to rank first for its time-slot and the entire night, in terms of both ratings and viewership, and served as the season's most viewed episode. "Sympathy for the Parents" was the season's least viewed episode, and up to that point, the series' as well, garnering only 9.87 million viewers. The season's finale garnered 16.13 million viewers, and received a 6.2/18 rating, ranking first for its time-slot and the entire night, in terms of both ratings and viewership. Although the finale was a success for the night, it was a 1% decrease from season five's finale, but served as the season's second most viewed episode. Overall, the season ranked at #17 for the year, and had an average of 13.26 million viewers, a 5% decrease from the previous season's ranking.

=== Critical response ===
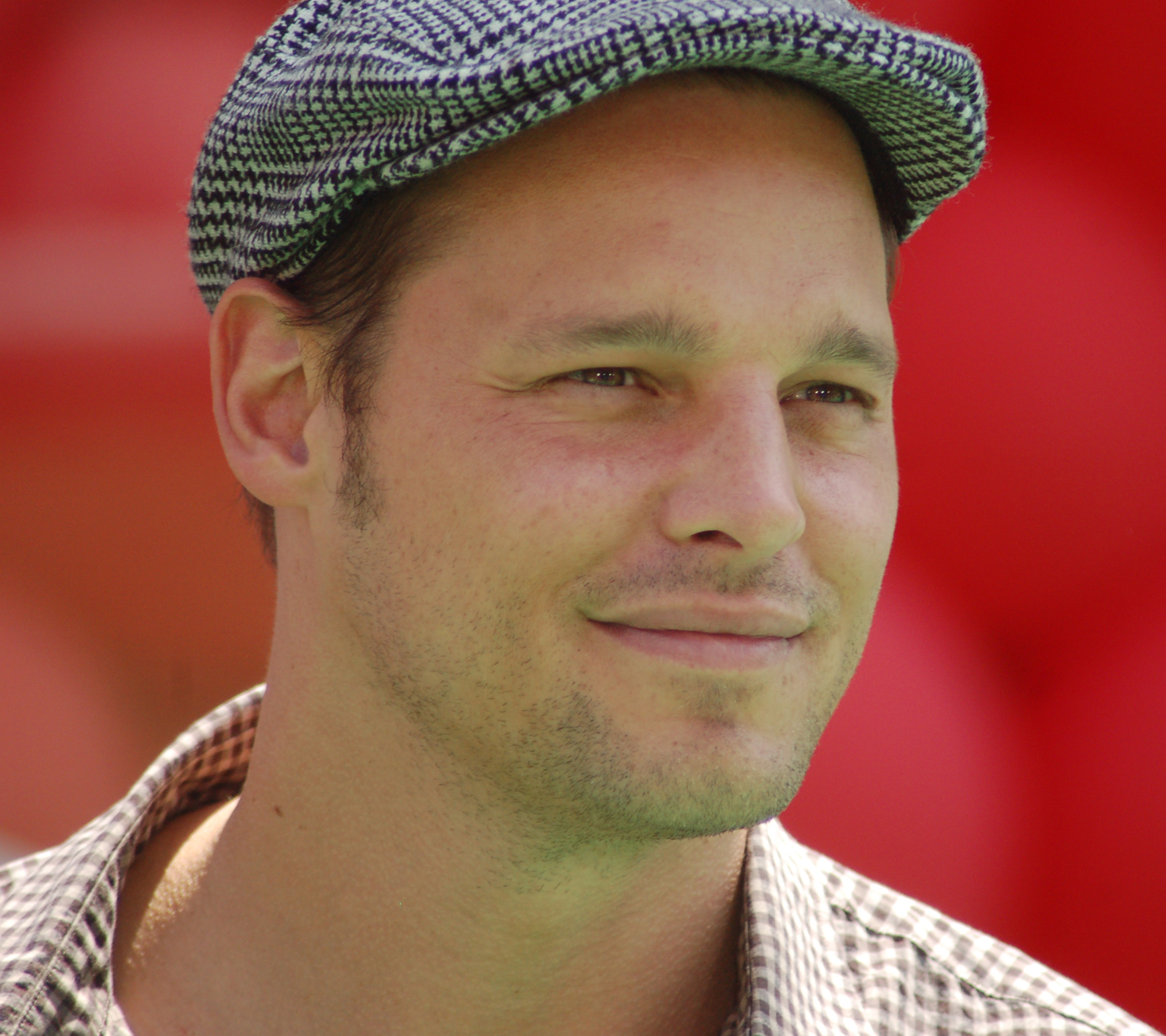
Justin Chambers' performance was well received.

The season received mixed-to-positive reviews among television critics. Speaking of the premiere, Glenn Diaz of BuddyTV noted that the special foreshadowed a "very dark" season, adding: "The talk between George's mom and one of the surgeons [Torres] proved to be one of the more heart-breaking scenes in an episode that in itself is heartbreaking enough." In contrast, Kelly West of TV Blend was critical of the premiere, writing: "I don’t think based on the first episode that we can say that Grey's is headed in a new direction, nor do I think the writers are making much of an effort to bring the series back to the greatness that was its earlier seasons. That said, this is Grey's Anatomy and with that comes the usual drama, sex, love and whacky medical mysteries thrown in the mix to keep things moving. If that's what you’re looking for, I think you’ll enjoy the season premiere just fine." Capshaw's performance this season was praised, with The TV Addict calling her "immensely likeable". Although "Sympathy for the Parents" was the least viewed episode, TV Fanatic called the episode "touching", praising Chambers' performance. TV Fanatic's reaction to the season was fairly mixed, with Steve Marsi saying that Grey's Anatomy was facing an identity crisis after viewing "Give Peace a Chance". He said that: "Still popular but lacking its past magic, it's trying to decide what to become. All we can say is that if it becomes what we saw 12 hours ago, we are all for it. Last week saw the doctors plunging into ER-style chaos with 12 different doctors giving 12 different accounts of one case. Last night, we saw something else equally unusual." He praised Patrick Dempsey's performance, saying: "Again, it was a single case that took up the entire hour, but instead of 12 doctors' version of events, the focus was largely on just one, and the best one: Dr. Derek Shepherd. Patrick Dempsey's McDreamy character may be eye candy, but he's got substance. Last night's episode proved that in spades, and was one of the series' best in some time."

The season's finale Death And All His Friends was highly praised. Marsi gave the episode five stars, and expressed that it may have been the best episode of the series, adding: "The writing and acting were absolutely stellar, and may lead to many Emmy nominations, but even more impressively, despite a killing spree, it remained distinctly Grey's. Some of the back-and-forths between the characters were truly memorable, and some of the developments so heartbreaking that we don't even know where to begin now. Seriously, the Season 6 finale left us laying awake afterward thinking about everything, a feeling we haven't had from Grey's in years and rarely achieved by any program." John Kubicek of BuddyTV also noted that the finale was the best episode, adding: "[It was] two of the best hours of television all year. It was certainly the best Grey's Anatomy has ever been, which is saying a lot since I'd written the show off for the past few years. No show does a big traumatic event like Grey's Anatomy, and the shooter gave the show license for heightened drama with five major characters being shot over the two hours. It was emotional, expertly paced and had me in tears for most of the finale." Entertainment Weekly wrote, "At any rate, now you can at least see where it all began. And while you’re still pondering how Grey's can still be so damn good sometimes,"

=== Accolades ===
The season was one of the least acclaimed of the series, in terms of awards and nominations. Despite not being nominated for a Primetime Emmy, the show received two Creative Arts Emmy Awards: Outstanding Prosthetic Makeup For A Series, Miniseries, Movie Or A Special for "How Insensitive" and Outstanding Makeup For A Single-Camera Series (Non-Prosthetic) for "Suicide is Painless". The season also received a nomination for Outstanding Drama Series at the GLAAD Media Awards. Wilson was awarded the NAACP Image Award for Outstanding Directing in a Dramatic Series for her directing in "Give Peace a Chance". The season also ranked at #10 on Movieline's top ten list.

== DVD release ==
Grey's Anatomy: The Complete Sixth Season - More is Better
Set Details		Special Features
24 Episodes (1 extended); 6-Disc Set; English (Dolby Digital 5.1 Surround); Subtitles: English SDH, Spanish & French; Runtime: 1048 minutes		Extended Finale: "Death and All His Friends" - With over 20 minutes of additional never-before-seen content.; Dissecting Grey's Anatomy - Unaired Scenes; Extended Scenes from the episode "The Time Warp"; In Stitches: Season Six Outtakes; Chandra wilson: Anatomy of A Talent; Seattle Grace: On Call- 6 Webisodes; The Making of "Seattle Grace: On Call"; Grey's Anatomy - Starter Kit: Seasons 1-5 recap
Release Dates
Region 1	Region 2	Region 4
September 14, 2010	December 5, 2011	November 3, 2010
