= Life as We Know It (film) =

2010 film by Greg Berlanti

- Theatrical release poster
- Directed by: Greg Berlanti
- Written by: Ian Deitchman; Kristin Rusk Robinson
- Produced by: Barry Josephson; Paul Brooks
- Starring: Katherine Heigl; Josh Duhamel; Josh Lucas
- Cinematography: Andrew Dunn
- Edited by: Jim Page
- Music by: Blake Neely
- Production companies: Village Roadshow Pictures; Gold Circle Films; Josephson Entertainment
- Distributed by: Warner Bros. Pictures
- Release date: October 8, 2010
- Running time: 115 minutes
- Country: United States
- Language: English
- Budget: $38 million
- Box office: $105.9 million

Life as We Know It is a 2010 American romantic comedy-drama film directed by Greg Berlanti, and stars Katherine Heigl and Josh Duhamel as two single adults who must settle their differences in order to take care of their goddaughter after her parents are killed in a car crash.

The film was theatrically released on October 8, 2010, in the United States by Warner Bros. Pictures. It received generally negative reviews from critics but it was a commercial success, grossing $106 million worldwide.

== Plot ==
Holly Berenson is the owner of a small Atlanta bakery, and Eric Messer is a promising television technical sports director for the Atlanta Hawks. Their best friends, Peter and Alison, set them up on a blind date that goes horribly wrong and results in both hating each other with a passion.

As the years go by, Peter and Alison get married and have a baby girl named Sophie. They also select Holly and Eric – who teasingly tolerate each other – as the godparents.

Shortly after Sophie's first birthday, Peter and Alison are killed in a car crash. Holly and Eric learn that their friends named them Sophie's joint guardians. After discovering that none of Peter and Alison's relatives are fit to take care of Sophie, the two put their differences aside and move into Sophie's home.

Living together proves to be a struggle. One evening, Holly is away at an important catering job when Eric is given the opportunity to direct a big basketball game. He takes Sophie with him, but her crying distracts him, leading to him making a big mistake on the broadcast. When they get home, Eric and Holly argue, but later they make up.

Holly goes on a date with Sam, Sophie's pediatrician. The date is cut short when Eric calls to tell Sam that Sophie has a high fever. When they join him at the hospital, Eric sees Holly kiss Sam.

Over time, the guardians discover that raising a child is more expensive than they had expected, so Holly can no longer afford to expand her business. Eric helps by investing in her company. They cement the new relationship by going on a date, which ends with them having sex and developing strong feelings.

Their Child Protective Services caseworker Janine tells them they must make a firm commitment, either to stay together, or break up, as waffling in between would be bad for Sophie. Eric is offered his dream job with the Phoenix Suns, and does not discuss it with Holly. When she finds out, she tells him to take the job, accusing him of looking for a way out of raising Sophie.

At Thanksgiving break, Eric returns from Phoenix for a visit, hoping to patch things up with Holly. She invites him to a dinner that she and Sam are hosting for neighbors and friends. Eric and Holly argue loudly when he learns she is planning to sell the house soon, as the upkeep is too costly. She accuses him of deserting her and Sophie, while he points out how quickly she replaced him.

Eric tells Holly he loves her, but leaves the dinner, planning to return to Phoenix. Once alone with Holly, Sam says that if he and his former wife had fought the way that Eric and she did, they would still be together. He tells Holly to work out her feelings for Eric, and leaves. That night, Sophie calls Holly "Mama" for the first time.

Janine visits to make her final determination whether Holly and Eric are fit parents. Holly realizes that she cannot take care of Sophie without Eric, and that she loves him. She, Sophie and Janine rush to the airport, but upon reaching the gate, finds that Eric's flight has departed.

Returning to the house, Holly finds Eric sitting inside. He tells her he has realized that Peter and Alison chose them to be Sophie's guardians because, together, they are a loving family. A few months later, they host Sophie's second birthday party, with all the neighbors and friends in attendance. Holly has made a second cake, with the number 1 on it, telling Eric, "It's for us, 'cause we made it a year", then they kiss.

== Cast ==
- Katherine Heigl as Holly Berenson
- Josh Duhamel as Eric Messer
- Josh Lucas as Sam
- Christina Hendricks as Alison Novak
- Hayes MacArthur as Peter Novak
- DeRay Davis as Lonnie
- Sarah Burns as Janine Groff
- Rob Huebel as Ted
- Bill Brochtrup as Gary
- Andy Buckley as George Dunn
- Andrew Daly as Scott
- Majandra Delfino as Jenna
- Reggie Lee as Alan Burke
- Melissa McCarthy as DeeDee
- Will Sasso as Josh
- Jessica St. Clair as Beth
- Kumail Nanjiani as Simon
- Alexis, Brynn, and Brooke Clagett as Sophie Christina Novak (The Baby)
- Jean Smart as Mrs. Berenson (uncredited)

== Production ==
Filming took place on location, in a house in the wealthy Buckhead area of Atlanta. Holly Berenson's bakery was depicted at Belly General Store in Virginia-Highland, a century-old bungalow-style neighborhood with several small-scale historic retail clusters, a few miles northeast of Downtown Atlanta. Scenes from Eric's workplace were filmed at Turner Broadcasting System (TBS) off Techwood Drive in Atlanta. Filming also took place at Philips Arena.

== Reception ==
On Rotten Tomatoes, the film has an approval percentage of 29% based on 152 reviews, with the critics consensus reading: "Katherine Heigl and Josh Duhamel make a charming couple with plenty of chemistry, but that isn't enough to make up for Life as We Know It's formulaic plot and poorly written script." On Metacritic, the film has a score of 39 out of 100 based on 31 critic reviews, meaning "generally unfavorable" reviews. Audiences polled by CinemaScore gave the film an average grade of "A−" on an A+ to F scale.

== Release ==
Life as We Know It grossed $53.4 million in the United States and $52.5 million in other territories for a worldwide total of $105.9 million against a production budget of $38 million.
