= Chandra Wilson =

American actress and director (born 1969)

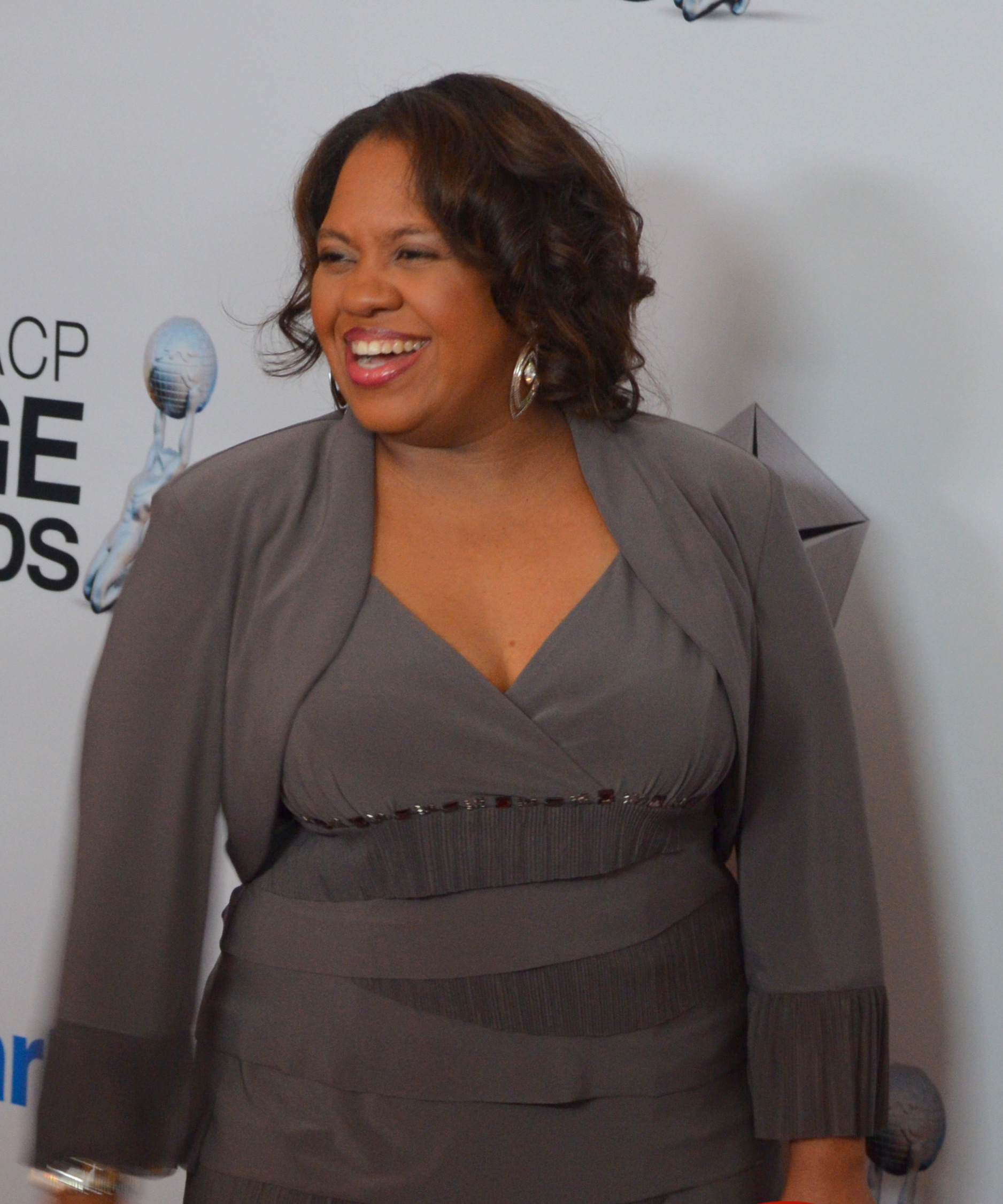
- Wilson in 2013
- Born: Chandra Danette Wilson; August 27, 1969 (age 57); Houston, Texas, U.S.
- Education: New York University (BFA)
- Occupations: Actress; director
- Years active: 1989–present
- Children: 3

Chandra Danette Wilson (born August 27, 1969) is an American actress and director best known for her role as Dr. Miranda Bailey in Grey's Anatomy (since 2005), for which she won a Screen Actors Guild Award for Outstanding Performance by a Female Actor in a Drama Series and two NAACP Image Award for Outstanding Supporting Actress in a Drama Series. She also played the character of Bailey on Private Practice and Station 19. She made her New York stage debut in 1991 and began to land guest spots on a variety of prime-time television shows. She made her first film appearance in the 1993 film Philadelphia.

== Early life ==
Wilson was born and raised in Houston, Texas. Her mother, a postal worker, wanted to keep her daughter active, so she enrolled Chandra in numerous after-school activities. "Starting at age four, my mom decided that she was not going to have an idle child in the house," Wilson recalls. "So I started taking dance lessons on Tuesdays and Thursdays, and then I was in acting classes on Mondays, Wednesdays and Fridays, and I was also modeling on Saturdays. And that was my childhood." "My first show was The King and I when I was five" she said in an interview with Broadway.com.

By the age of five, Wilson was performing in musicals with Houston's Theatre Under the Stars Company. She attended Houston's High School for the Performing and Visual Arts and continued on to New York University's Tisch School of the Arts, graduating with a BFA in drama in 1991. For the next four years, from 1991 to 1995, she studied at the Lee Strasberg Theatre & Film Institute while at the same time racking up professional theater credits. She made her New York debut in a 1991 production of The Good Times Are Killing Me and won a Theater World Award for Outstanding Debut Performance. Her other early stage credits include off-Broadway productions of Paper Moon: The Musical and Little Shop of Horrors.

While she was making a name for herself on the New York stage, Wilson also began to land guest spots on a variety of prime-time television shows. She appeared on The Cosby Show (1989), Law & Order (1992) and CBS Schoolbreak Special (1992). She made her big-screen debut alongside Tom Hanks and Denzel Washington in the highly acclaimed 1993 film Philadelphia. Despite receiving high praise for nearly all of her performances, however, Wilson struggled for many years to gain more prominent roles. For eight years, while she pursued a career in theater, Wilson temped at Deutsche Bank in the document-processing department in order to pay her bills.

In 2005, Wilson landed her breakthrough role as Dr. Miranda Bailey on the hit ABC show Grey's Anatomy.

== Career ==
Wilson's first regular network TV role was in the short-lived series Bob Patterson (2001), a post-Seinfeld vehicle for Jason Alexander. In a review for USA Today, Robert Bianco called Wilson "the only person in the show you can imagine wanting to see again". Similarly, the Los Angeles Times said, "The only character here that's amusingly written is Bob's new assistant, Claudia (Chandra Wilson)". She also appeared on Third Watch (2001), Law & Order SVU, Sex and the City (2002), and The Sopranos (2004), and had a small role in Lone Star (1996).

Wilson also had career in theater, where she played Bonna Willis in The Good Times Are Killing Me, and was featured in the Tony-nominated musical Caroline, or Change. Wilson is an accomplished singer and has sung in several productions, including On the Town (1998), Avenue Q (2003) and Caroline, or Change (2004).

Wilson worked as a temp at Deutsche Bank Alex. Brown where she made presentations for the investment banking units. She worked at the Banker's Trust location on 130 Liberty Street, right across the street from the South Tower of the World Trade Center through 9/11 when that building was lost to the terrorist attacks. Wilson was still working at a bank when she auditioned for the Grey's Anatomy pilot. She was cast as Miranda Bailey, a role initially envisioned as a blonde-haired white woman. The show became a success. Wilson was nominated in 2006, 2007, 2008 and 2009 for an Emmy Award for Best Supporting Actress in a Drama. She was nominated and won the Screen Actors Guild Award in 2007 for Outstanding Female Actor in a Drama Series; she also won a SAG Award as part of the Grey's Anatomy cast, which won Best Ensemble in a Drama Series.

Wilson made her television directing debut with the episode "Give Peace a Chance", the 7th episode in season 6 of Grey's Anatomy. She also directed episode 17, "Push", of the same season and the fifth episode of season 7, "Almost Grown", the 21st episode of eight season, "Moment of Truth", "Second Opinion", the 6th episode of ninth season and "Transplant Wasteland", the 17th episode of ninth season. The part of Dr. Bailey, supervisor to the hospital interns, had been written for a petite, blonde-haired white woman, but Wilson, a full-figured African-American woman, gave such an impressive audition that the show's producers decided to give her the part. "Besides," she later joked, "I knew the casting director." Wilson earned rave reviews for her performance as the tough-as-nails Dr. Bailey. Wilson was nominated for four consecutive Emmy Awards (2006–2009) and won four consecutive NAACP Image Awards (2007–2010) for Best Supporting Actress in a Drama Series. She also won the 2008 People's Choice Award for Favorite Scene-Stealing Star. In 2009, while still starring on Grey's Anatomy, Wilson took a brief hiatus from the show to go to Broadway as Mama Morton in a revival of Chicago.

Wilson explained the only difference between her acting career now and her acting career a decade ago is that people actually recognize her on the street. "The only difference in my career now is the visibility I have," she insisted. "People say I made it now, but I feel like I made it doing summer stock." She is also clear-headed about the fragility of her new-found fame and fortune. Upon finally leaving her job at Deutsche Bank to focus solely on her role in Grey's Anatomy, Wilson was careful not to burn any bridges. She said, "They told me I could come back if acting doesn't work out. I told them, 'Keep my seat warm.'"

In 2014, Wilson made a guest starring appearance on the ABC Daytime soap opera General Hospital as patient Tina Estrada. In 2018, she appeared on General Hospital as Dr. Linda Massey. In April 2019, it was announced Wilson would make a third guest star appearance on General Hospital, but this time as Sydney Val Jean in May 2019.

== Personal life ==
In Parade May 2007 edition, Wilson described herself as "I'm in a relationship, but I'm not married." She has been with her partner for 31 years as of 2019. Wilson and her partner have 3 children; their daughter Serena was born in 1992, daughter Joylin was born in 1998, and son Michael was born on October 31, 2005.

=== Activism ===
Wilson is an activist for the cause of cyclic vomiting syndrome and serves as the spokesperson for the Cyclic Vomiting Syndrome Association, as well as, the celebrity ambassador for CureMito! after her teenage daughter, Serena, developed the disease in 2010. For the ninth season of Grey's Anatomy Wilson met with the producers and pitched the idea of featuring cyclic vomiting syndrome in an upcoming episode. The episode, "Second Opinion", aired on November 15, 2012, and was directed by Wilson.

She also is an advocate for people with mental and/or substance use disorders. In 2015, she hosted the 10th Annual Voice Awards event for the Substance Abuse and Mental Health Services Administration.

== Filmography ==
=== Film ===
Year	Title	Role	Notes
1990	Peer Pressure, Drugs and... You		
1993	Mad Dog and Glory		
1993	Philadelphia	Chandra	
1996	Lone Star	Athena	
2003	Head of State	Jaime	Uncredited
2005	I Love the 80's 3-D	Herself	
2008	A Single Woman	Coretta Scott King	
2010	Frankie and Alice	Maxine	
2018	Christmas Harmony	Karen	

=== Television ===
Year	Title	Role	Notes
1989	The Cosby Show	Dina	Episode: "The Lost Weekend"
1991	Sesame Street	Teenage Student	Episode: "Telly Monster follows Gordon to school for a "Wide World of Sesame Street" report"
1992	CBS Schoolbreak Special	Gloria	Episode: "Sexual Considerations"
1992	Law & Order	Serena Price	Episode: "Cradle to Grave"
2000	Cosby	Unknown	Episode: "It's a Wonderful Wife"
2001	Third Watch	Volunteer	Episode: "Man Enough"
2001	100 Centre Street	Unknown	Episode: "No Good Deed Goes Unpunished"
2001	Bob Patterson	Claudia	Unknown episodes
2002	Sex and the City	Police Officer	Episode: "Anchors Away"
2002, 2005	Law & Order: Special Victims Unit	Nurse Jenkins	Episode: "Waste"
2002, 2005	Law & Order: Special Victims Unit	Rachel Sorannis	Episode: "911"
2003	Queens Supreme	Dolores	Episode: "The House Next Door"
2004	The Sopranos	Evelyn Greenwood	Episode: "Cold Cuts"
2005–present	Grey's Anatomy	Dr. Miranda Bailey	Main cast (season 1–present); 410 episodes NAACP Image Award for Outstanding Actress in a Drama Series; NAACP Image Award for Outstanding Supporting Actress in a Drama Series (2007–08); People's Choice Award for Favorite Scene Stealing Star; Satellite Award for Best Cast – Television Series; Screen Actors Guild Award for Outstanding Performance by a Female Actor in a Drama Series; Screen Actors Guild Award for Outstanding Performance by an Ensemble in a Drama Series; Nominated—BET Award for Best Actress on Television (2007–08); Nominated—Golden Nymph Award for Outstanding Actress – Drama Series; Nominated—NAACP Image Award for Outstanding Actress in a Drama Series (2010–14); Nominated—NAACP Image Award for Outstanding Supporting Actress in a Drama Series; Nominated—Primetime Emmy Award for Outstanding Supporting Actress in a Drama Series (2006–09); Nominated—Satellite Award for Best Supporting Actress – Series, Miniseries or Television Film (2007–08); Nominated—Screen Actors Guild Award for Outstanding Performance by an Ensemble in a Drama Series (2006, 2008)
2008	Sesame Street	Herself	Episode: "Number 6 Games"
2008	Accidental Friendship	Yvonne	Made-for-TV movie directed by Don McBrearty; Prism Award for Performance in a Television Movie or Miniseries; Nominated—NAACP Image Award for Outstanding Actress in a Television Movie, Mini-Series or Dramatic Special; Nominated—Primetime Emmy Award for Outstanding Lead Actress in a Miniseries or a Movie
2009	Private Practice	Dr. Miranda Bailey	2 episodes
2014, 2018–2019, 2023	General Hospital	Tina Estrada	Episode: Episode #1.12982
2014, 2018–2019, 2023	General Hospital	Dr. Francine Massey	Episode: Episode #1.14154
2014, 2018–2019, 2023	General Hospital	Sydney Val Jean	Episode: Episode #1.14331 (uncredited), Episode: Episode #1.15254
2018–2024	Station 19	Dr. Miranda Bailey	Recurring role; 24 episodes
2021	Celebrity Wheel of Fortune	Herself	Episode: "Leslie Jones, Chandra Wilson and Tony Hawk"

=== Director ===
Year	Title	Episode
2009–present	Grey's Anatomy	"Give Peace a Chance" (2009) "Push" (2010) "Almost Grown" (2010) "White Wedding" (2011) "Take the Lead" (2011) "Moment of Truth" (2012) "Second Opinion" (2012) "Transplant Wasteland" (2013) "I Want You with Me" (2013) "Do You Know?" (2014) "The Bed's Too Big Without You" (2015) "With or Without You" (2015) "My Next Life" (2016) "I Wear the Face" (2016) "Both Sides Now" (2016) "In the Air Tonight" (2017) "Go Big or Go Home" (2017) "Games People Play" (2018) "Everyday Angel" (2018) "We Didn't Start the Fire" (2019) "Breath Again" (2019) "Hotter Than Hell" (2021) "Stronger Than Hate" (2022) "Cowgirls Don't Cry" (2023) "Blood, Sweat and Tears" (2024) "Papa Was a Rollin' Stone" (2025)
2015–2017	The Fosters	"Daughters" (2015) "Highs & Lows" (2016) "Chasing Waterfalls" (2017)
2015	Scandal	"Get Out of Jail, Free" (2015)
2019–2022	Good Trouble	"Twenty-Fine" (2019) "Wake Up For Your Reverie" (2022)

== Stage ==
Year	Show	Role	Theatre	Notes
1991	The Good Times are Killing Me	Bonna Willis	Second Stage Theater	Original
1998	On the Town	Woman of Carnegie Hall, Flossie's Friend, Person of New York, Lucy Schmeeler understudy	Gershwin Theatre	Original
2003	Avenue Q	Gary Coleman understudy	John Golden Theatre	
2004	Caroline, or Change	Dotty Moffett	Eugene O'Neill Theatre	Original
2009	Chicago	Matron "Mama" Morton	Ambassador Theatre	

== Awards and nominations ==
Year	Association	Category	Work	Result
1991	Theatre World Awards	Performance as Bonna Willis	The Good Times are Killing Me	Won
2006	Emmy Awards	Outstanding Supporting Actress in a Drama Series	Grey's Anatomy	Nominated
2006	Image Awards	Outstanding Supporting Actress in a Drama Series	Grey's Anatomy	Nominated
2007	BET Awards	Best Actress	Grey's Anatomy	Nominated
2007	Emmy Awards	Outstanding Supporting Actress in a Drama Series	Grey's Anatomy	Nominated
2007	Image Awards	Outstanding Supporting Actress in a Drama Series	Grey's Anatomy	Won
2007	Satellite Awards	Best Supporting Actress in a Television Vision/Mini-Series	Grey's Anatomy	Nominated
2007	Screen Actors Guild Awards	Outstanding Actress in a Drama Series	Grey's Anatomy	Won
2007	Screen Actors Guild Awards	Outstanding Cast in a Drama Series	Grey's Anatomy	Won
2008	BET Awards	Best Actress	Grey's Anatomy	Nominated
2008	Emmy Awards	Outstanding Supporting Actress in a Drama Series	Grey's Anatomy	Nominated
2008	Image Awards	Outstanding Supporting Actress in a Drama Series	Grey's Anatomy	Won
2008	People's Choice Awards	Favorite Scene Stealing Star	Grey's Anatomy	Won
2008	Satellite Awards	Best Supporting Actress in a Television Vision/Mini-Series	Grey's Anatomy	Nominated
2008	Satellite Awards	Best Ensemble Cast in a Series	Grey's Anatomy	Won
2008	Screen Actors Guild Awards	Outstanding Cast in a Drama Series	Grey's Anatomy	Nominated
2009	Emmy Awards	Outstanding Supporting Actress in a Drama Series	Grey's Anatomy	Nominated
2009	Emmy Awards	Outstanding Lead Actress in a Miniseries or Movie	Accidental Friendship	Nominated
2009	Image Awards	Outstanding Actress in a Drama Series	Grey's Anatomy	Won
2009	Image Awards	Outstanding Actress in a Mini-Series/Television Movie	Accidental Friendship	Nominated
2010	Image Awards	Outstanding Directing in a Drama Series	"Give Peace a Chance" (Grey's Anatomy)	Won
2010	Image Awards	Outstanding Supporting Actress in a Drama Series	Grey's Anatomy	Nominated
2011	Image Awards	Outstanding Actress in a Drama Series	Grey's Anatomy	Nominated
2012	Image Awards	Outstanding Actress in a Drama Series	Grey's Anatomy	Nominated
2013	Image Awards	Outstanding Actress in a Drama Series	Grey's Anatomy	Nominated
2014	Image Awards	Outstanding Actress in a Drama Series	Grey's Anatomy	Nominated
2022	Image Awards	Outstanding Supporting Actress In A Drama Series	Grey's Anatomy	Nominated
