= Nora Zehetner =

American actress

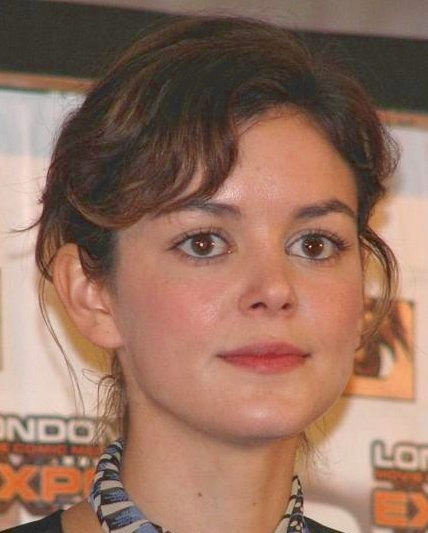
- Zehetner in 2007
- Occupation: Actress
- Years active: 2000–present

Nora Zehetner is an American film and television actress.

== Career ==
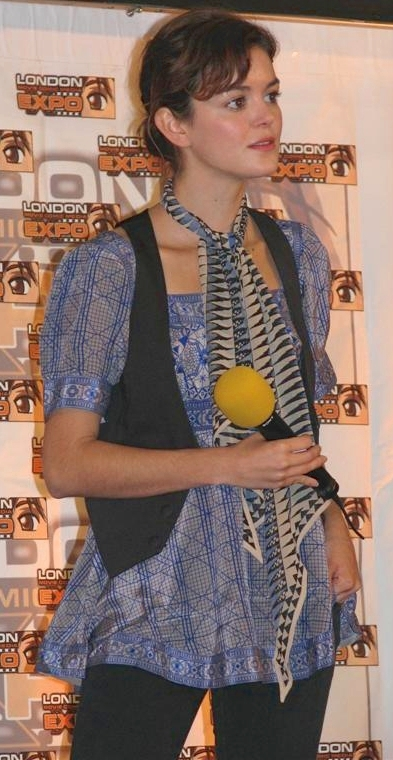
London MCM Expo 2007

At the age of 18, Zehetner started an acting career, something she had been interested in since she was 8, and moved to Los Angeles. She appeared in Tart (2001), American Pie 2 (2001), R.S.V.P. (2002), May (2002), and The Song of Rose (2003), as well as in other films and several TV series and commercials. Zehetner portrayed Laynie Hart on the WB's show Everwood.

In Brick, which won the Special Jury Prize for Originality of Vision at the 2005 Sundance Film Festival, Zehetner plays the femme fatale Laura. The soundtrack CD of this film, released by Lakeshore Records on March 21, 2006, features Zehetner's full, unedited performance of "The Sun Whose Rays Are All Ablaze".

In the thriller-horror film Beneath, Zehetner appears in the leading role of Christy.

Zehetner also starred in NBC's Heroes as Eden McCain. Zap2It.com proclaimed Zehetner one of "The Underrated of 2006" for her role.

Together with the actors and comedians Tom Arnold and Dax Shepard, Zehetner embarked in 2007 on a USO/Armed Forces Entertainment tour to the Persian Gulf region to meet with service members and sign autographs.

In 2007, Zehetner appeared with Marisa Berenson in the short movie Jalouse: Elegante, famous, beautiful, jolie which was produced by the French fashion magazine Jalouse to celebrate their 10th anniversary.

Zehetner portrayed the recurring role of Dr. Reed Adamson for 10 episodes during the sixth season (2009–2010) of the television series Grey's Anatomy.

Zehetner portrayed Jen, Marc Maron's girlfriend, on the TV series Maron.

In 2018, Zehetner was cast in the recurring role of Valeria Poriskova on the second season of the ABC political drama Designated Survivor.

Nora Zehetner played Annie Glenn, the wife of astronaut John Glenn, in the television series The Right Stuff, which premiered in October 2020 on Disney+.

== Filmography ==
=== Film ===
| Year | Title | Role | Notes |
|---|---|---|---|
| 2001 | Tart | Peg | |
| 2001 | American Pie 2 | Girl at Party | |
| 2002 | May | Hoop | |
| 2002 | R.S.V.P. | Leigh Franklin | |
| 2003 | The Burning Land | Rose | |
| 2005 | Brick | Laura Dannon | |
| 2005 | Conversations with Other Women | Young Woman | |
| 2005 | The Adventures of Big Handsome Guy and His Little Friend | Plain Jane | Short film |
| 2006 | Fifty Pills | Michelle | |
| 2007 | Jalouse | Jane Morris | Short film |
| 2007 | Beneath | Christy | |
| 2008 | Remarkable Power | Athena | |
| 2008 | The Brothers Bloom | Rose | |
| 2009 | Spooner | Rose Conlin | |
| 2009 | Jerry | Girl | Short film |
| 2014 | Imperial Dreams | Janine | |
| 2014 | The Hitchhiker | Nancy Adams | Short film |
| 2014 | Danny and the Wild Bunch | Miranda | Short film |
| 2014 | Home Is Where Your Heart Aches | Kat | Short film |
| 2015 | Creative Control | Juliette | |
| 2017 | It Happened in L.A. | Nora | |
| 2017 | Lost in Sound | | Short film |
| 2018 | Color Me Done | Elizabeth | Short film |
| 2018 | Magnetic Plasma for mass(es) Enlightenment | Harmony | Short film |
| 2020 | Freeze | Joy | Short film |
| 2021 | Spring Bloom | Sabrina | |
| 2023 | Blood for Dust | Amy | |
| 2024 | Boneyard | Detective Young | |
| 2024 | Monster Summer | Abby Reed | |

=== Television ===
| Year | Title | Role | Notes |
|---|---|---|---|
| 2000 | Gilmore Girls | Girl in Hallway | "Rory's Birthday Parties" |
| 2001 | Going to California | Dixie Hartnett | "Taking Care of Biscuits" |
| 2001 | An American Town | Glenn | TV film |
| 2002 | Point of Origin | Trish | TV film |
| 2002 | She Spies | Ashley Blaine | "Daddy's Girl" |
| 2002 | Off Centre | Lindsay | "The Deflower Half-Hour" |
| 2002 | Septuplets | Dot Wilde | TV series |
| 2003–04 | Everwood | Laynie Hart | Recurring role (season 1), main role (season 2) |
| 2006, 2009 | Heroes | Eden McCain | Recurring role |
| 2008 | Princess | Princess Ithaca | TV film |
| 2009–10 | Grey's Anatomy | Dr. Reed Adamson | Recurring role |
| 2009–10 | Seattle Grace: On Call | Dr. Reed Adamson | Web series |
| 2010 | Southland | Lila Greenburg | "Butch & Sundance" |
| 2010 | Mad Men | Phoebe | "Christmas Comes But Once a Year", "The Chrysanthemum and the Sword" |
| 2012 | Common Law | Kendall | "Soul Mates", "The Ex-Factor" |
| 2013 | Grimm | Khloe Sedgwick | "Kiss of the Muse" |
| 2013 | Warehouse 13 | Rose | "The Sky's the Limit" |
| 2013–16 | Maron | Jen | Recurring role |
| 2015 | The Astronaut Wives Club | Marilyn See | "Flashpoint", "Rendezvous", "Abort" |
| 2016 | Gortimer Gibbon's Life on Normal Street | Margaret | "Gortimer vs. White Hat" |
| 2017 | Pillow Talk | Sharon | TV series |
| 2018 | Designated Survivor | Valeria Poriskova | Recurring role |
| 2019 | Green Eggs and Ham | Clerk (voice) | "Anywhere" |
| 2020 | Agents of S.H.I.E.L.D. | Viola | "The New Deal", "Know Your Onions" |
| 2020 | The Right Stuff | Annie Glenn | TV series |
| 2025 | Grosse Pointe Garden Society | Melissa | Recurring role |

=== Music videos ===
- "Quand Nina est saoule" (2008) – Ours
- "Her Fantasy" (2012) – Matthew Dear
