= Rashaad Ernesto Green =

American film director

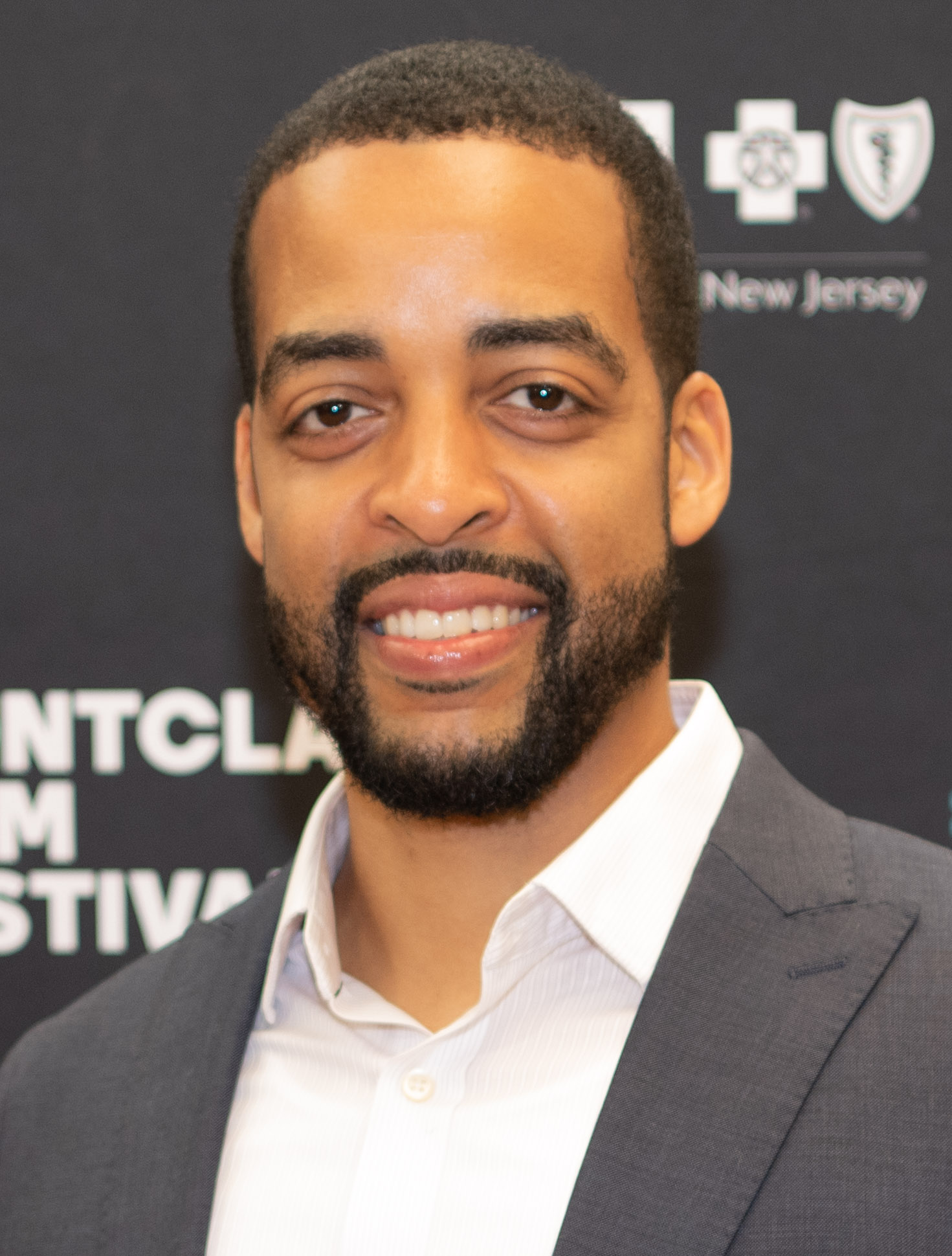
- Green in 2019
- Born: The Bronx, New York City
- Occupations: Director, screenwriter
- Years active: 2007–present
- Notable work: Gun Hill Road (2011); Premature (2019)

Rashaad Ernesto Green is an American filmmaker and director. He wrote and directed the feature films Gun Hill Road (2011) and Premature (2019). He won the Someone to Watch Award for his work on the latter film.

== Biography ==
=== Early life ===
Green was born in The Bronx. He was one of two sons raised by a single father. He attended Dartmouth College in Hanover, New Hampshire and was inspired to pursue a career in film after August Wilson was invited to the college to teach theatre for a semester.

=== Career ===
Green began his career as an actor and pursued a Master's degree in acting at New York University. While completing his graduate studies, he decided to become a director instead. He attributed this decision partly to his frustration with the typecasting of black actors as drug dealers and criminals in television, and his desire to change the industry. He wrote and directed the short film Choices (2009) which was screened at the Sundance Film Festival.

In 2011, he directed his debut feature film Gun Hill Road. In 2019, he directed the romantic drama film Premature, starring Zora Howard. He has subsequently directed both feature films and television series.

In 2022, it was announced that Green will direct the film '68, a biopic about Olympians Tommie Smith and John Carlos, for Metro-Goldwyn-Mayer.

== Filmography ==
Short film

Year	Title	Director	Writer
2007	Cuts	Yes	Yes
2009	Choices	Yes	Yes
2012	Showtime	Yes	Yes

Feature film

Year	Title	Director	Writer	Producer
2011	Gun Hill Road	Yes	Yes	No
2019	Premature	Yes	Yes	Yes
TBA	'68	Yes	No	No

Television

Year	Title	Episode(s)
2014	Grimm	"The Good Soldier"
2015	Supernatural	"Inside Man" "Thin Lizzie"
2016	The Vampire Diaries	Episode "One Way or Another"
2017	The Breaks	"Hard to Handle" "It's Just Begun"
2017	Being Mary Jane	"Getting Served" "Getting Home" "Feeling Exposed" "Feeling Friendless"
2017-2018	The Quad	"Quicksand" "My Bondage and My Freedom" "#TheColorPurple"
2018	Vida	"Episode 3"
2018	Luke Cage	"On and On"
2019	Proven Innocent	"A Cinderhella Story"
2019	Looking for Alaska	"Now Comes the Mystery"
2023	The Chi	"Brewfurd" "House Party" "Who Shot Ya?"
