= How to Get Away with Murder season 5 =

How to Get Away with Murder
- Season 5
- Promotional poster
- Starring: Viola Davis; Billy Brown; Jack Falahee; Rome Flynn; Aja Naomi King; Matt McGorry; Conrad Ricamora; Karla Souza; Amirah Vann; Charlie Weber; Liza Weil; Timothy Hutton
- No. of episodes: 15

Release
- Original network: ABC
- Original release: September 27, 2018 – February 28, 2019

Season chronology
- ← Previous; Season 4 Next → Season 6

The fifth season of the ABC American television drama series How to Get Away with Murder was ordered on May 11, 2018, by ABC. It began airing on September 27, 2018, and consisted of 15 episodes, concluding on February 28, 2019.

== Cast and characters ==
=== Main ===
- Viola Davis as Annalise Keating
- Billy Brown as Nate Lahey
- Jack Falahee as Connor Walsh
- Rome Flynn as Gabriel Maddox
- Aja Naomi King as Michaela Pratt
- Matt McGorry as Asher Millstone
- Conrad Ricamora as Oliver Hampton
- Karla Souza as Laurel Castillo
- Amirah Vann as Tegan Price
- Charlie Weber as Frank Delfino
- Liza Weil as Bonnie Winterbottom
- Timothy Hutton as Emmett Crawford

=== Recurring ===
- John Hensley as Ronald Miller
- Tamberla Perry as Theresa Hoff
- Jessica Marie Garcia as Rhonda Navarro
- Glynn Turman as Nate Lahey Sr.
- Elizabeth Morton as Julie Winterbottom
- Laura Innes as Lynne Birkhead
- Cynthia Stevenson as Pam Walsh
- Melinda Page Hamilton as Claire Telesco
- Terrell Clayton as Jeffrey Sykes
- William R. Moses as Special Agent Lanford

=== Guest ===
- Mia Katigbak as Joanna Hampton
- Heidi Sulzman as Molly Keener
- Teya Patt as Paula Gladden
- Tom Verica as Sam Keating
- D.W. Moffett as Jeff Walsh
- Jim Abele as Ted Walsh
- Dante Verica as young Gabriel Maddox
- Famke Janssen as Eve Rothlo
- Tess Harper as Sheila Miller
- Cicely Tyson as Ophelia Harkness
- Gerardo Celasco as Xavier Castillo

== Episodes ==
No. overall	No. in season	Title	Directed by	Written by	Original release date	U.S. viewers (millions)
61	1	"Your Funeral"	Stephen Cragg	Peter Nowalk	September 27, 2018	2.93
As Connor, Michaela, Asher, and Laurel start their third year at law school, Annalise returns to teaching part-time for the Advanced Trial Skills class, selecting 24 new students to help her retry old cases for her class action suit. Following her win at the Supreme Court, Annalise also starts working at Caplan & Gold after receiving multiple job offers, working aside Tegan and the new managing partner, Emmett Crawford. Bonnie gets closer to ADA Ronald Miller in an attempt to find out how much he knows about the group, as Nate investigates Bonnie's child, whom she thought was dead but is confirmed to be alive. At the same time, new second-year student Gabriel Maddox impresses Annalise and is chosen as one of the twenty-four students to help her with the case load, while Asher is left out. Oliver, Connor, Michaela and Laurel move in together, and Frank starts suspecting Gabriel's own reasons for being at Middleton. Flashforward: Three months later, Annalise is dancing at Connor and Oliver's wedding when she spots Frank across the room. She asks him why he looks like someone died, and his response results in her slapping him. Outside, an unknown bleeding person (as seen from their point of view) walks towards the wedding tent and falls onto the snow. Later, baby Christopher is shown crying and sitting on the snow close by, and Bonnie walks up to suffocate the unknown individual with her bare hands.
62	2	"Whose Blood Is That?"	Mike Smith	Sarah L. Thompson	October 4, 2018	3.02
Annalise takes on her first client from the class action suit, with Michaela working alongside her. Emmett gets a closer look at Annalise's students, finding out that Laurel Castillo is working at the clinic. Tegan is afraid that with Michaela and Laurel working there, everyone will find out she was the "Jane Doe" who exposed Jorge, so Laurel tells Emmett that her mother must have been the one who exposed Jorge, since she had disappeared after his arrest. Tegan gets Christopher into Caplan & Gold daycare. Asher lands a job at the DA's office after stalking ADA Miller and Bonnie herself. Frank continues to investigate Gabriel, and gets him to move into Rebecca's old apartment, where he has cameras installed. Nate finds a photo of a woman who resembles Bonnie stealing her baby. Flashforward: Two and a half months later, Bonnie runs through the snow with Christopher to the bathroom, where she cleans his face. Michaela and Laurel enter the bathroom, asking her about Nate. After Laurel gets out of the bathroom with Christopher, Michaela asks Bonnie whose blood is on her leg.
63	3	"The Baby Was Never Dead"	Valerie Weiss	Erika Harrison	October 11, 2018	3.22
Annalise and Emmett take on a wealthy client who is accused of killing his work partner; the DA in charge of the case is Miller. During the case, Asher reveals to Miller that he and Bonnie used to date. The governor continues to threaten Annalise's class action suit by forcing everyone in Annalise's class into an ethics exam. Frank continues to investigate Gabriel, and finds a fake ID and a hard drive among his things. Oliver discovers Frank's investigation of Gabriel. Nate finds the nurse who worked on the shift when Bonnie's baby was stolen, and it seems like Bonnie is the one who took him. When he shows Annalise, she tells him that the woman in the photo is actually Bonnie's sister. Flashforward: Two months later, Michaela asks Bonnie whose blood is on her leg, and Bonnie tells her that she cut herself shaving. Later, at the party, the DJ calls the grooms to center stage. Connor walks in with bruises on his face and asks if anyone has seen his husband. Michaela looks across the room at Bonnie.
64	4	"It's Her Kid"	Cherie Nowlan	Maisha Closson	October 18, 2018	2.74
After Nate confronts Annalise about Bonnie's past, he asks her to tell Bonnie that her child may be alive. She hesitates to do so, while she tries to obtain permission to argue insanity in Nate Sr.'s case. Emmett tries to sign a new client with the help of Tegan, who tests Michaela's ambition by having her attempt to blackmail the client to sign. Connor discovers that Annalise helped him get back into Middleton, and he later confronts her about it, causing her to make Gabriel, rather than Connor, second chair for Nate Sr.'s case. Oliver confronts Frank about hacking Gabriel, and both he and Laurel start investigating on their own. Eventually, Annalise tells Bonnie about the file that Denver had on her, and how Nate discovered her child may be alive. Flashforward: One and a half months later, Michaela unsuccessfully tries to reach Nate on his phone, which is in Bonnie's possession. She leaves a message telling him to call her back, while Connor and Laurel start worrying about finding Oliver. Back at her apartment, a dazed Annalise collapses on the floor in anguish.
65	5	"It Was the Worst Day of My Life"	Laura Innes	Michael Russo	October 25, 2018	2.93
Annalise asks her students what they think she did wrong in court on Nate Sr.'s trial that prevented her from winning. As the students start to analyze what they could have done wrong, we see the trial unfold as they change their strategies constantly. Bonnie reflects on her child and tells Miller a part of her dark past. Laurel confronts Frank about spying on Gabriel and who he is. Bonnie goes to her sister's house to get answers. Flashforward: The night of the wedding, Connor looks for Oliver outside on the parking lot. There, as he starts to panic, he finds his mom and Asher together.
66	6	"We Can Find Him"	Jonathan Brown	Tess Leibowitz	November 1, 2018	2.86
Governor Lynne Birkhead offers Annalise a plan for her to work with her to implement a "Fair Defense Project", which would require her to leave her job at Caplan & Gold. Bonnie talks with her sister Julie, who admits that she did take the baby. Julie later reveals that she ran with the baby and apparently buried him in the woods. Connor and Oliver's mothers visit their sons in preparation for the wedding, and Oliver discloses that he is HIV-positive to his mother. Laurel keeps her secrets. To Emmett's dismay, Annalise takes the governor's deal to get Nate Sr. pardoned and out of the mental facility, but he is shot and killed before being released from prison. Flashforward: One month later, with an engagement ring in a velvet box in his hands, Miller texts Bonnie outside of the wedding, and asks her to meet him so they can talk.
67	7	"I Got Played"	Eric Laneuville	Maya Goldsmith	November 8, 2018	3.02
Nate Sr.'s death is ruled a justifiable homicide, since he allegedly attacked one of the guards during his transport. Annalise believes that the governor is playing her, which is confirmed when the governor informs Annalise that the Pennsylvania Fair Defense Project will not be going forward. As a result, Annalise convinces Tegan to rehire her at Caplan & Gold. Connor and Oliver secure a church and a minister for the wedding, and Connor attacks and gets into a fight with a homophobic man. Gabriel suspiciously tries to get closer to Michaela, and the two later have sex. Laurel and Frank continue spying on Gabriel, which Bonnie later finds out. Flashforward: On the night of Connor and Oliver's wedding, someone sees Bonnie suffocating the unknown individual, who seems to be shocked. After finishing, Bonnie tells this other person to take the victim's car and body away, telling them they will figure out the rest as they go.
68	8	"I Want to Love You Until the Day I Die"	Stephen Cragg	Joe Fazzio	November 15, 2018	3.13
As everyone prepares for the wedding, Connor and Oliver finally get married. Michaela looks more into Nate Sr.'s death, as well as Annalise and Nate, but she finds something that makes it apparent that Miller made the call to the warden of the prison on the night of Nate Sr.'s death, presumably under the governor's orders. Blaming Miller for his father's death, Nate savagely beats him outside of the wedding tent. Bonnie finds them both and finishes the job by smothering a bloodied Miller, then orders Nate to dispose of the body. Frank learns that Gabriel knows who he is. He goes to Annalise at the wedding reception and reveals that Gabriel is the son of her late husband Sam Keating, and Sam's first wife. Annalise slaps him and goes home, where she finds that Gabriel has let himself into her apartment.
69	9	"He Betrayed Us Both"	John Terlesky	Daniel Robinson	January 17, 2019	2.84
After Bonnie kills Ron, Nate takes the body in his car to dispose of it. Bonnie goes to the bathroom with Christopher to clean up but Michaela stumbles upon them and grows suspicious after she notices blood on Bonnie's leg. Gabriel reveals the true intent behind his transfer to Middleton: an effort to know more about his father, Sam Keating, and specifically about his death. Asher, Laurel and Michaela grow suspicious that Bonnie may have done something to Gabriel. Laurel later discovers blood stains on Christopher's blanket, which heighten her suspicions. Eve shows up at Annalise's door, informing her of Sam's past efforts to reconnect with his ex-wife that never came to fruition. Later that night, Gabriel calls someone to tell them that "she" knows. Flashback: In 2005, after Annalise loses her baby, her marriage to Sam is in a turbulent phase. Both she and Sam immerse themselves in clandestine comfort; Sam tries to contact Vivian Maddox to develop a relationship with their son, Gabriel, while Annalise becomes depressed and withdrawn. To fill the empty void, Annalise begins paperwork for Wes' adoption, of which Sam does not approve.
70	10	"Don't Go Dark on Me"	Cherie Nowlan	Sara Rose Feinberg	January 24, 2019	2.74
Bonnie and Nate plan ahead of Miller being declared missing; however, they need to bring Asher on board, since it seems like he was the last person to see Miller alive while talking with Nate. They decide to tell him everything, but they ask him to keep it to himself and not tell the others. On Monday morning, Miller is declared missing as they thought, and Nate finds an alibi for his injured hand, while also being interrogated by the FBI along with Bonnie and Asher. Annalise seeks the help of Frank and Eve to keep Gabriel from finding out what actually happened to Sam on the night of the bonfire. Annalise's plan includes manipulating Gabriel into keeping quiet to protect his mother Vivian. Gabriel confronts the Keating Four about Sam and tells them that he's Sam's son. Later, the rest of the Keating Four and Oliver find out that Nate killed Miller. Bonnie discovers a phone call Miller made which makes him seem innocent.
71	11	"Be the Martyr"	Alrick Riley	Matthew Cruz	January 31, 2019	2.58
After Bonnie shows Nate and Annalise the phone call Miller made before the transfer of Nate Sr., Nate decides to prove Miller is responsible for his father's death. Annalise helps Emmett at C&G when the latter's misconduct case is brought back. The FBI continues the investigation into Miller's disappearance and starts to see Nate as a suspect. Nate claims that Miller and Governor Birkhead were conspiring in the murder of Nate Sr., which leads Agent Claire Telesco to find out that the evidence Miller presented in court was fabricated. Agent Telesco starts an investigation into Miller and Governor Birkhead. Laurel confronts Bonnie for exposing Christopher to a murder. Michaela tries to get Tegan to stop pursuing Nate's case, which makes her suspicious, as she later calls Telesco asking to meet. After Nate's findings, Telesco arrests Gabriel, who calls Annalise to help him out.
72	12	"We Know Everything"	Jennifer Getzinger	Michael Russo & Sarah L. Thompson	February 7, 2019	2.74
Annalise represents Gabriel after he is arraigned for domestic terrorism; she instructs the Keating 5 to dig into Gabriel's past to discover any incriminating information that may be used against him in court. The group, examining the footage from the secret camera Frank installed in Gabriel's apartment, discover that the FBI planted evidence to build a case against Gabriel, leading to his release. Although Gabriel is disappointed in the Keating Four for invading his privacy, Annalise asks them to keep an eye on him. Connor and Oliver go through their wedding photos to ascertain that none of them captured Nate and Ron together. In a bid to prove that Bonnie and Nate did not kill an innocent man, the two dig into Miller's phone records and inform Annalise that he knew about her intentions to adopt Wes. Using a dummy account, Michaela emails Tegan, telling her that her identity as "Jane Doe" has been compromised and successfully scaring her into silence. Annalise later warns Tegan that Emmett is reading her emails. Miller's body is later found. Asher is tagged in an Instagram photo posted by Connor's mother, which shows Nate and Ron together.
73	13	"Where Are Your Parents?"	DeMane Davis	Maya Goldsmith & Daniel Robinson	February 14, 2019	2.57
On Christmas Eve, Annalise invites everyone over to dinner at her apartment. Annalise is called by Telesco, who offers her an immunity deal for everything. Nate tells her it's a trap, while Bonnie goes to Miller's funeral. There, Miller's mother asks Bonnie to find her son's murderer, making her feel guilty. The Keating Four also prepare for the holidays. Frank invites Gabriel to keep an eye on him, and Connor's mother is also invited. In the middle of the night, Agent Telesco and the FBI enter the Keating Four's house and confiscate Oliver's computer to find evidence that Miller went to Connor and Oliver's wedding. As Telesco moves forward in her investigation, Tegan gets close to her only to get her off the case, in which she succeeds. Laurel calls Telesco for help after receiving a call from an unknown number, which appears to be her mother. After everything seems to be solving itself, Governor Birkhead asks Annalise to meet in a church, only to reveal to her that the actual murderer of Nate Sr. is Emmett Crawford.
74	14	"Make Me the Enemy"	Mike Smith	Erika Harrison & Matthew Cruz	February 21, 2019	2.56
After Birkhead's revelation, Annalise asks Tegan for help to find out if Emmett was actually involved in Nate Sr.'s murder. To keep him close and look more into him, Annalise agrees to go on a date with Emmett. Michaela gets closer to Gabriel as he keeps trying to find out what happened to his father. Laurel meets with Agent Telesco, asking her for help to find her mother after getting a series of unknown contact calls. Telesco only offers her the same immunity deal she offered to Annalise. Laurel decides to forgive Bonnie. Connor and Oliver get Oliver's computer back in court. Annalise keeps growing suspicious of Emmett when Tegan finds his phone records and he himself reveals that he's running for DA On his computer, Oliver finds a picture it took of the FBI's office, which shows a board with an ongoing investigation called "Operation Bonfire", as the FBI seems to be getting close to finding out about everything. They tell Annalise, but she asks them to stay quiet. Annalise finally confronts Emmett. Laurel receives a "gift" that appears to be Sandrine's scalp. Bonnie, Frank and Nate find a video recording in the prison before Nate Sr.'s death. Frank finds out that the lawyer, initially assumed to be Emmett, is actually Laurel's brother Xavier Castillo, who tried and failed to steal Lahey from Annalise's class action.
75	15	"Please Say No One Else Is Dead"	Stephen Cragg	Joe Fazzio	February 28, 2019	2.76
After watching the prison tapes, Laurel is convinced her incarcerated father is behind all the recent developments. Frank continues his investigation into the death of Nate Sr. and if Miller was involved. Frank stalks the prison guard who was on duty on the night of Nate Sr.'s death; she confesses that Xavier Castillo, working with the governor, was the mastermind behind Nate Sr.'s death, which exonerates Miller. Annalise and Frank decide to tell the wrong version of the story to save Nate and Bonnie the guilt from having murdered an innocent man. Emmett is taken into custody by the FBI in connection with the murder of Nate Sr., but he is later released with Annalise's help, and he vows to run for DA. He is later seen on the floor of his office gasping for air. Annalise and Laurel storm out of Xavier's office after a heated, bitter exchange of words. Laurel and her son suddenly disappear from Annalise's side. Flashback: Xavier tries to convince Nate Sr. to let him take his case, making Sr. suspicious. Later, it is shown that Xavier and Miller were in touch, but they fell out when the latter backed out. Trying to save Nate Sr., Miller transfers him before Xavier can reach him, but Xavier learns of his plan and threatens him.

== Production ==
=== Development ===
How to Get Away with Murder was renewed for a fifth season on May 11, 2018, by ABC. In July 2018, series creator and showrunner Peter Nowalk told Deadline Hollywood his plans for the fifth season, confirming that the wedding between Jack Falahee and Conrad Ricamora's characters would take place, as well as a flashback episode further exploring the marriage between Viola Davis and Tom Verica's characters Annalise and Sam Keating, respectively. Additionally, he stated that the season's flashforwards were expected to be "twisty, and more fun", and tonally different. The first table read occurred on July 13, 2018.

=== Casting ===
In June 2018, Rome Flynn was promoted to the series' main cast after appearing in a guest capacity in the fourth-season finale. In July 2018, Amirah Vann was promoted to the series' main cast after recurring in the fourth season. Later that month, Timothy Hutton joined the main cast.

=== Filming ===
Filming for the season started on July 19, 2018.

== Reception ==
=== Critical response ===
On review aggregator Rotten Tomatoes, the fifth season has a rating of 83%, based on six reviews, with an average rating of 7.67/10. Writing for The A.V. Club, Kayla Kumari Upadhyaya criticized the "messy" storytelling of the season and the series as a whole.

=== Ratings ===
Viewership and ratings per episode of How to Get Away with Murder season 5
No.	Title	Air date	Rating/share (18–49)	Viewers (millions)	DVR (18–49)	DVR viewers (millions)	Total (18–49)	Total viewers (millions)
1	"Your Funeral"	September 27, 2018	0.8/4	2.93	1.0	2.58	1.8	5.51
2	"Whose Blood Is That?"	October 4, 2018	0.8/4	3.02	0.8	2.30	1.6	5.32
3	"The Baby Was Never Dead"	October 11, 2018	0.8/4	3.28	0.9	2.31	1.7	5.59
4	"It's Her Kid"	October 18, 2018	0.7/3	2.74	0.8	2.36	1.5	5.10
5	"It Was the Worst Day of My Life"	October 25, 2018	0.7/3	2.93	0.9	2.29	1.6	5.23
6	"We Can Find Him"	November 1, 2018	0.8/3	2.86	0.8	2.34	1.6	5.21
7	"I Got Played"	November 8, 2018	0.7/3	3.02	0.9	2.32	1.6	5.34
8	"I Want to Love You Until the Day I Die"	November 15, 2018	0.8/3	3.13	0.9	2.38	1.7	5.51
9	"He Betrayed Us Both"	January 17, 2019	0.7/3	2.84	0.9	2.42	1.6	5.26
10	"Don't Go Dark on Me"	January 24, 2019	0.6/3	2.74	0.8	2.21	1.4	4.95
11	"Be the Martyr"	January 31, 2019	0.6/3	2.58	0.8	2.18	1.4	4.76
12	"We Know Everything"	February 7, 2019	0.6/3	2.74	0.8	2.21	1.4	4.97
13	"Where Are Your Parents?"	February 14, 2019	0.6/3	2.57	0.7	2.22	1.3	4.79
14	"Make Me the Enemy"	February 21, 2019	0.5/3	2.56	0.8	2.19	1.3	4.75
15	"Please Say No One Else Is Dead"	February 28, 2019	0.6/3	2.76	0.7	2.14	1.3	4.91
