= How to Get Away with Murder season 6 =

How to Get Away with Murder
- Season 6
- Promotional poster
- Starring: Viola Davis; Billy Brown; Jack Falahee; Rome Flynn; Aja Naomi King; Matt McGorry; Conrad Ricamora; Amirah Vann; Charlie Weber; Liza Weil
- No. of episodes: 15

Release
- Original network: ABC
- Original release: September 26, 2019 – May 14, 2020

Season chronology
- ← Previous; Season 5

The sixth and final season of the American television drama series How to Get Away with Murder premiered on September 26, 2019, and concluded on May 14, 2020. Ordered in May 2019 by ABC, the season consisted of 15 episodes.

== Cast and characters ==
=== Main ===
- Viola Davis as Annalise Keating
- Billy Brown as Nate Lahey
- Jack Falahee as Connor Walsh
- Rome Flynn as Gabriel Maddox
- Aja Naomi King as Michaela Pratt
- Matt McGorry as Asher Millstone
- Conrad Ricamora as Oliver Hampton
- Amirah Vann as Tegan Price
- Charlie Weber as Frank Delfino
- Liza Weil as Bonnie Winterbottom

=== Recurring ===
- Marsha Stephanie Blake as Vivian Maddox
- William R. Moses as Lanford, an FBI special agent
- Jennifer Jalene as Avery Norris, an FBI agent
- Tom Verica as Sam Keating
- Ray Campbell as Solomon Vick
- Kelen Coleman as Chloe Millstone
- Gerardo Celasco as Xavier Castillo
- Mercedes Mason as Cora Duncan
- Cas Anvar as Robert Hsieh
- Quei Tann as Peyton Osborn
- Jennifer Parsons as Lydia Millstone
- Deborah Levin as Sara Gordon / Denise Pullock
- Lauren Bowles as Deanna Montes, an assistant United States attorney
- Kathleen York as Martha Vitkay, a judge
- Esai Morales as Jorge Castillo
- Laura Innes as Lynne Birkhead, the governor of Pennsylvania
- Cicely Tyson as Ophelia Harkness
- Karla Souza as Laurel Castillo

=== Guest ===
- Emily Bergl as Sally
- Kathleen Quinlan as Britt
- Beverly Todd as Donna Fitzgerald
- Sam Anderson as Thomas Fitzgerald
- Jessica Marie Garcia as Rhonda Navarro
- Natalia del Riego as Marisol Diaz
- Oscar Daniel Reyez as Hector Diaz
- Dijon Talton as Ravi
- Tess Harper as Sheila Miller
- Teya Patt as Paula Gladden
- Alfred Enoch as Christopher Castillo
- Cynthia Stevenson as Pam Walsh
- D.W. Moffett as Jeff Walsh
- Anne-Marie Johnson as Kendra Strauss
- Dante Verica as young Gabriel Maddox
- Jamie McShane as Lennox, a United States attorney
- Marc Grapey as Floyd Bishop
- Gwendolyn Mulamba as Celestine Harkness
- Famke Janssen as Eve Rothlo

== Episodes ==
No. overall	No. in season	Title	Directed by	Written by	Original release date	U.S. viewers (millions)
76	1	"Say Goodbye"	Stephen Cragg	Sarah L. Thompson	September 26, 2019	2.43
Following Laurel's disappearance and Emmett's death, a depressed and intoxicated Annalise checks into a rehab. Encouraged by Sally's acceptance, she lets go of all her guilt by doing an exercise of self-forgiveness. Meanwhile, the Keating 3 are still dealing with Laurel's disappearance. Connor, Oliver, and Asher find evidence that Annalise knew Michaela's birth father, Dwight. Michaela gets closer to Gabriel and they have sex. Tegan takes Emmett's place as managing partner at Caplan & Gold, and Nate starts investigating her. Bonnie and Frank report Laurel's disappearance and Frank finds a key behind a framed photo of Laurel and Christopher. Annalise returns to Philadelphia and successfully recreates the self-forgiveness exercise with Connor, Michaela, Asher, and Oliver, but she is confronted about her connection with Michaela's dad. Flashforward: In an unknown period of time later, Annalise's funeral being held is shown.
77	2	"Vivian's Here"	Mike Smith	Michael Russo	October 3, 2019	2.56
Gabriel's mother, Vivian, confronts Annalise about her involvement in Sam's murder. Connor and Asher lead C&G's new case, which involves an 8-year-old, Hector, who’s been separated from his immigrant mother and been traumatized by experiences with ICE. Helped by Tegan, they put him into foster care. Frank asks Jorge Castillo in jail about Laurel's whereabouts, but he claims he knows nothing. Annalise reveals to Frank that the key he found belongs to a safe deposit box owned by Wes, and it contains information about their misdeeds. Frank, pretending to be Wes, gets access to an empty box. The clerk reveals that Laurel was the last person to access the box, three days prior. Annalise starts suspecting Tegan after Nate sees her talking to Vivian. Bonnie is fired from the DA's office after obtaining Vivian's sealed file illegally. Annalise visits Vivian and tells her Gabriel killed her boyfriend. Flashforward: Michaela is seen being interrogated by the FBI in respect of a murder. Her fingerprints have been found to be a match on the murder weapon.
78	3	"Do You Think I'm a Bad Man?"	Catriona McKenzie	Daniel Robinson	October 10, 2019	2.23
Michaela heads the case of a woman (Alexandra Grey) who has been accused of helping her now dead husband rob money. After unsuccessful attempts, Michaela gets the client on probation with Annalise's help. Bonnie asks Tegan to hire her, who accepts, although initially reluctant. Through a cab driver, Frank finds an address Laurel was last seen and, there, is received by Xavier Castillo. After Bonnie and Tegan's intervention, Hector and his mother are allowed to stay together after being detained by ICE because of Connor. It is revealed that Tegan is married. Gabriel confesses to his mother that he killed her boyfriend, Paul, years ago. It is revealed that Vivian is actually spying for FBI. She gives Gabriel a set of recordings of Annalise's therapy sessions with Sam. Gabriel shows a particular tape to Michaela which he thinks is about her father, who is actually a lawyer. Nate is offered a deal to close his father's case in exchange for spying on Annalise. Flashforward: Connor is being questioned by the FBI and is shown a photograph and accused of murder, to which he breaks into a laugh and subsequently suffers a panic attack. Michaela listens to Connor having trouble breathing on the other room; she starts crying and screaming to him, worried about his health.
79	4	"I Hate the World"	Scott Printz	Matthew Cruz	October 17, 2019	2.10
Working on a case, Annalise meets lawyer Robert Hsieh, who asks her out, to which she accepts. Oliver misses work to get high and cook, until Tegan demands him to avoid a resignation. Connor agrees to Oliver's request to have a threesome. Asher's sister, Chloe, shows up at his apartment to talk. Michaela and Gabriel go to New York to find her father, Solomon Vick. She tries to get a DNA sample from Solomon and ultimately meets him in person. Through Sam's tapes, Gabriel finds out Annalise broke up with Eve to confess her feelings to Sam. Gabriel appears at Annalise's and say she always claimed Sam was the bad guy, but she came onto him. Nate discovers that Tegan shares a company with Laurel. After reading Tegan's divorce papers, Bonnie tells her she's getting a bad deal. Afterwards, Tegan calls Cora, her wife, and tells her she's ready to proceed. A brutally beaten Frank appears at home.
80	5	"We're All Gonna Die"	Felix Alcala	Sara Rose Feinberg	October 24, 2019	2.25
Flashbacks explore Xavier’s encounter with Frank, whilst Bonnie takes care of his health. After painful listening sessions, Annalise smashes the tape recorder and explains her actions to Gabriel. Connor and Oliver enjoy threesome twice with a man named Ravi. Connor confronts Oliver about his participation in Frank's investigation. Tegan argues with Cora about their broken marriage; while leaving, Cora is helped by Nate when her motorcycle won't start. After talking to her father and demanding money from him, Michaela tells Connor that she is going to break up with Gabriel and wants to see Solomon suffer. Worried about their mother's mental state, Chloe begs Asher to come home, to which he agrees. Bonnie confronts Annalise about the money Frank says she got from Laurel. Annalise calls her secret bank and finds the balance is down to $2.17, then calls Solomon and says it is time for him to "pay up". Flashforward: Tegan appears at a crime scene in Gabriel's apartment building; blood is shown pooling on the floor.
81	6	"Family Sucks"	Laura Innes	Vanessa James Benton	October 31, 2019	2.16
Tegan fires Bonnie after Cora revealed to her that Nate approached Cora with intentions to find out more about Tegan's past. Tegan goes to Nate's and proposes a wrongful death suit for his father's case. Despite Annalise's contrary advice, Michaela asks Solomon to stay away after he appears in town and later gets rid of the money he gave her. Her fight with Gabriel continues and she ends up hooking up with Asher. In exchange for advising Michaela, Solomon provides Annalise money and multiple fake passports. She confronts Frank about him saying she helped Laurel. Frank tells her that Xavier affirms he has Wes's confession. Annalise wins a restraining order against the entire Castillo family. Asher has an explosive moment with his mother, stating that she is going to hell. Flashforward: Asher shows up at Bonnie's with blood on his shirt.
82	7	"I'm the Murderer"	Lily Mariye	Laurence Andries	November 7, 2019	2.21
Annalise goes on a second date with Robert. Connor tells Oliver about the night Sam died. Gabriel leads a case regarding restorative justice. Michaela declares she is purposefully abstinent. In order to keep Ron's innocence undisclosed, Annalise summons Frank to stop Tegan and Nate from naming the governor in Nate's wrongful death suit. Frank indirectly threatens Tegan with a USB flash drive with photographs of Cora. Gabriel tries to reconcile with Michaela. She reveals her hook up with Asher and apologizes. Eventually, Gabriel and Asher get into a fight. Frank tells Annalise he’s in love with Bonnie. Governor Birkhead asks Xavier to find out everything he can about Bonnie. Flashforward: Frank shows up at the police station to pick up Oliver, but Oliver suddenly confesses he's the murderer.
83	8	"I Want to Be Free"	Alrick Riley	Hadi Nicholas Deeb	November 14, 2019	2.28
Annalise has another date with Robert. Oliver tries to cheer the Keating 3 up with their admission essays, but that leads to an argument among the group. Gabriel starts hooking up with a girl, attracting Michaela's jealousy. In live news, Birkhead points out Bonnie's conflict of interest in Nate's case. Annalise and Frank secretly place Ron's mother in the stand and she reveals her past with Bonnie and their shared mourning. As Bonnie is removed from the case, Tegan takes over. Faced by Annalise, Tegan reveals that she will stay on the case because she is tired of subjugating herself to someone more powerful. Birkhead's car was seen near Ron's house, but it is later revealed that only a staffer was in the car. Bonnie testifies that a source has revealed to her information that implicates Ron in the murder of Nate's father. Bonnie suffers a car accident after her car is tampered with. After being threatened by Frank, prison guard Paula Gladden reveals that Xavier ordered Nate Sr.'s death, different from what she had previously stated. Nate decides to continue the case against the governor. Learning that Ron was innocent, Bonnie breaks down in her hospital room and pushes Frank away. Flashforward: Annalise starts the process of faking her death and disappearing.
84	9	"Are You the Mole?"	Stephen Cragg	Maisha Closson	November 21, 2019	2.16
Annalise advises her students to put their future clients first and seek a truly fair justice system. Nate signs a continuation to postpone the civil action until after Xavier's trial. News reports that an anonymous informant caused the FBI to reopen old cases, including Sam's murder, in which Wes is not believed to have acted alone. Michaela, Connor, Asher and Oliver eat hallucinogenic mushrooms. Asher proposes to Michaela as a way to grant them spousal immunity. Laurel calls them and reveals that Tegan helped her disappear. Asher reveals that he is the informant. Oliver hits him in the nape with a fireplace poker. Asher falls unconscious, but eventually wakes up, revealing that he became the informant because, weeks before, the FBI threatened to arrest his mother, who was aware of thefts in which her husband acted. Confronted, Asher suggests they get the same deal he did and blame the crimes on Annalise. Afterwards, he vanishes. Sometime later, Michaela and Connor are arrested for murdering Asher, who was beaten to death outside of Gabriel's apartment. Annalise starts the process of disappearing. In a flashforward, Wes appears at Annalise's funeral, somehow still alive.
85	10	"We're Not Getting Away With It"	Sheelin Choksey	Tess Leibowitz	April 2, 2020	2.91
Oliver confesses to killing Asher after arguing with Connor's mother, Pam. He eventually learns that, after being hit in the head, Asher appeared at Bonnie's house trying to tape her commenting on her involvement in the group's past crimes. Then, Frank drove him home, thus proving that he was killed by someone else sometime later. At a bail hearing, Oliver is released due to circumstantial charges, but Connor and Michaela remain in custody. The prosecution offers an immunity deal for the two if they confess their implications for past crimes, including the murder of Sam Keating, and testify against Annalise. If they do not accept it, they would remain in prison until a trial driven by a life sentence. Nate visits Bonnie and asks if Frank killed Asher, to which she replies that he should turn himself in for killing Ron. Michaela and Connor accept the deal; before signing, both asked that they have the same conditions, even if the other did not sign. In Mexico, using the name Justine, Annalise decides not to follow the people who helped her escape from the United States and is ultimately found by the Mexican police.
86	11	"The Reckoning"	DeMane Davis	Inda Craig-Galván	April 9, 2020	2.78
Annalise is put under house arrest after being accused of possessing false documentation and falsifying her passport. With the help of Tegan, she gets the prosecution's bill of particulars to learn what accusations the AUSA have against her. She summons Michaela and Connor after learning of their betrayal. Tegan learns that the AUSA is alleging a pattern of arson based on the fire that burnt down Annalise's childhood house. Ophelia advises Annalise to take care of herself and leave other people aside. Annalise tells her mother that she dated Eve before Sam. Subsequently, Ophelia leaves Annalise's apartment to visit Nate, to whom she asks why he isn't helping Annalise. Flashback: Asher called Chloe on Gabriel's cell phone to let her know that Michaela, Connor and Oliver had discovered that he was the informant. He taped a video; before sending it, he was caught by his killer. Through the lower crack in the door, Gabriel saw a woman killing Asher in the hall and then walking down the stairs. Because of the woman's ear, Gabriel recognizes her as Pollock, the FBI agent responsible for Asher's case.
87	12	"Let's Hurt Him"	Janice Cooke	Daniel Robinson & Matthew Cruz	April 16, 2020	2.81
The AUSA goes for the death penalty which Annalise fights with the help of Tegan. Though Michaela and Connor reveal to Annalise that Gabriel saw the FBI murder Asher, she chooses not to use the recording as it would put Gabriel's life in danger; instead she plays a recording of her conversation with Michaela and Connor admitting they feel coerced into testifying to get the DOJ to drop the death penalty; Michaela and Connor are subsequently arrested. Vivian reveals that Sam's sister Hannah started the whole war against Annalise, but realizes that Annalise doesn't know the true reason why. Xavier is captured and tortured by Frank, eventually confessing to Nate that he helped murder Nate's father for the governor, supposedly to help prove that it was too dangerous to let criminals on the streets again. After Xavier reveals that his father ordered him to work for the governor, Nate snaps his neck, preventing Xavier from being used as a witness on Annalise's behalf.
88	13	"What If Sam Wasn't the Bad Guy This Whole Time?"	Dawn Wilkinson	Ricardo C. Lira	April 30, 2020	2.77
After killing Xavier, Nate tells Frank that he has a plan and not to get rid of the body. He then researches Agent Pollock, confirming that she’s dirty. Armed with this information, Nate goes to the FBI and tells Lanford that Pollock is working with the Castillos, putting Pollock in custody. Meanwhile, the FBI rescinds their deal with Connor and Michaela due to Annalise recording their conversation. Lanford offers them both new deals which would force them to give up more information on Annalise. Connor confides to Oliver that he accepted Lanford’s deal and lied to Michaela in rejecting it. Elsewhere, Vivian convinces Gabriel to leave Philadelphia and tells Annalise that she believes Hannah’s vendetta against Annalise is because Hannah and Sam had an incestuous relationship. Annalise has Tegan look into Hannah’s past and they discover that Hannah was absent for 83 days of high school because of a pregnancy. After a DNA test, Annalise informs Bonnie that Frank is Hannah and Sam's child. Flashback: In 2005, we see the start of Sam and Vivian’s affair in the wake of the car crash that cost Annalise her baby and the trauma it caused. Frank threatens Vivian and Gabriel if she doesn’t stop seeing Sam. Sam, meanwhile, forced Frank to break up with Bonnie given the pain from her abusive past.
89	14	"Annalise Keating Is Dead"	John Terlesky	Sarah L. Thompson & Tess Leibowitz	May 7, 2020	2.69
Annalise's trial begins with Laurel Castillo called in as a surprise witness to discredit Tegan as Annalise's attorney; Annalise agrees to defend herself instead. On the stand, Annalise attacks Michaela's credibility by revealing her deportation of Simon Drake and attacks Connor over his own history of lies after having Frank reveal that Michaela got a better deal. After a confrontation with Annalise and Frank, Laurel suddenly and unexpectedly testifies on Annalise's behalf that Wes acted alone and she perjured herself at the request of Agent Lanford; although Laurel's testimony creates doubt in the jury's minds, Nate still has yet to testify. Nate approaches Jorge Castillo to testify against the governor, claiming that he understands that the governor was the one truly responsible for his father's murder, not the Castillos. After news of Xavier's murder breaks, Nate uses it as proof that Jorge needs to help take the governor down. Annalise blackmails Hannah using Frank's paternity to get her to testify for her and against the governor; Hannah demands in return that Annalise publicly admit to murdering Sam after being legally exonerated. Annalise agrees to take the deal, but Hannah is found dead of an apparent suicide shortly thereafter. Annalise and Bonnie suspect either the governor or Frank, who Bonnie had just revealed the truth to, had murdered Hannah.
90	15	"Stay"	Stephen Cragg	Peter Nowalk	May 14, 2020	3.20
In her impassioned closing arguments, Annalise admits to some crimes but insists that she is not guilty of the crimes for which she is on trial. Laurel enlists Tegan's help in arranging her father's murder in prison in exchange for millions of dollars' worth of property. The jury finds Annalise not guilty. During a press conference after the trial, Frank murders Governor Birkhead; both he and Bonnie are killed by return fire from the courthouse security guards. At the same time, Jorge is stabbed to death inside the prison. Flashforward: In 2052, Annalise's funeral reveals she died of old age with Tegan; Eve gives her eulogy. Michaela is sworn in as a judge but has lost her law school friends. Connor and Oliver have reunited after Connor's prison sentence. Christopher Castillo, now the spitting image of his father Wes, begins teaching Annalise's criminal law class at Middleton which he names "How to Get Away With Murder" in Annalise's honor.

== Production ==
=== Development ===
ABC renewed How to Get Away with Murder for a sixth season on May 10, 2019. After initial rumoring, it was announced on July 11, 2019, that the series would end with the upcoming season.

=== Writing ===
Besides the plans of following up with the previous season's cliffhanger on the whereabouts of Laurel Castillo and her son, other storylines are intended to be depicted in the sixth season, including Tegan Price's past, Michaela's father and his relationship to Annalise, and Vivian Maddox's life and background. According to series creator Peter Nowalk, "Every crime [that's been committed] will come up for grabs, be answered for, and will have to be paid for" and "each character will have to decide what they're willing to do and to see if they're willing to sell other people out."

According to TVLine, a different mystery will be introduced by the end of the season premiere. "There will still be a flash forward in the first episode," Nowalk shared. "It's a mystery that's really big, the biggest one we've done. It makes us get on a high-speed train [headed] toward the end of the show." In the meantime, Annalise is "in bad shape" following Laurel's disappearance, and Nowalk says "we're going to see what Annalise's version of falling apart is". Plus, the FBI's ongoing investigation into Annalise and company "is front and center". Nowalk teases, "They know a lot, clearly. The question is, do they have the evidence to finally charge them? And who are they going to charge?" Additionally, one of Michaela's birth parents will come into the picture in a storyline that Nowalk describes as "very twisty, but also very emotional and surprising. I don't think the parent is going to be anyone you would expect."

=== Casting ===
For the sixth season, Timothy Hutton left the starring cast after his character's death. Karla Souza, who had portrayed Laurel Castillo since the series' inception, also exited the main cast, coinciding with Laurel and her son's disappearances in the previous season's finale.

In an interview with TV Insider, Nowalk revealed that Marsha Stephanie Blake would guest star in the season in a "great mystery role", later revealed to be that of Sam's ex-lover and Gabriel's mother, Vivian Maddox. In October 2019, Cas Anvar joined the supporting cast as Robert Hsieh, "an in-house lawyer of a popular dating app". In January 2020, it was announced that Lauren Bowles had been cast as Assistant U.S. Attorney Montes. In March 2020, Anne-Marie Johnson was cast as Kendra Strauss, a "chic, high-powered defense attorney", and Cicely Tyson's return was announced.

== Reception ==
=== Critical response ===
Reviewing the first episode, Maureen Lee Lenker of Entertainment Weekly complimented Viola Davis's performance, writing, "We will never get tired of watching her deliver week after week. To be honest, it’s probably what we’ll miss most about the show." The A.V. Club's Kayla Kumari Upadhyaya gave the first episode a "B+" rating, stating "It would make sense for [the series] to go fully off the rails one last time in its final season, especially as it attempts to weave together every story that's still open. But maybe this will finally be the season that the show doesn't lose itself in its own madness."

=== Ratings ===
Viewership and ratings per episode of How to Get Away with Murder season 6
No.	Title	Air date	Rating/share (18–49)	Viewers (millions)	DVR (18–49)	DVR viewers (millions)	Total (18–49)	Total viewers (millions)
1	"Say Goodbye"	September 26, 2019	0.6/3	2.43	0.6	1.98	1.2	4.41
2	"Vivian's Here"	October 3, 2019	0.5/3	2.56	0.6	1.85	1.1	4.41
3	"Do You Think I'm a Bad Man?"	October 10, 2019	0.5/3	2.23	0.6	1.79	1.1	4.02
4	"I Hate the World"	October 17, 2019	0.4/2	2.10	0.6	1.76	1.0	3.86
5	"We're All Gonna Die"	October 24, 2019	0.5/3	2.25	0.5	1.76	1.0	4.01
6	"Family Sucks"	October 31, 2019	0.4/2	2.16	0.5	1.71	0.9	3.86
7	"I'm the Murderer"	November 7, 2019	0.4/2	2.21	0.6	1.92	1.0	4.13
8	"I Want to Be Free"	November 14, 2019	0.5/2	2.28	0.5	1.73	1.0	4.01
9	"Are You the Mole?"	November 21, 2019	0.4/2	2.16	0.6	1.72	1.0	3.88
10	"We're Not Getting Away With It"	April 2, 2020	0.6/3	2.91	0.6	1.78	1.2	4.70
11	"The Reckoning"	April 9, 2020	0.6/3	2.78	0.5	1.75	1.1	4.53
12	"Let's Hurt Him"	April 16, 2020	0.6/3	2.81	0.5	1.57	1.1	4.38
13	"What If Sam Wasn't the Bad Guy This Whole Time?"	April 30, 2020	0.6/4	2.77	0.6	1.78	1.2	4.54
14	"Annalise Keating Is Dead"	May 7, 2020	0.5/3	2.69	0.6	1.70	1.1	4.39
15	"Stay"	May 14, 2020	0.7/4	3.20	0.5	1.71	1.2	4.91
