= Amirah Vann =

American actress

- Vann in 2017
- Born: Amirah Charline Vann; June 24, 1980 (age 46); Queens, New York, U.S.
- Education: Fordham University (BA); New York University (MFA)
- Occupations: Actress; singer
- Years active: 2006–present

Amirah Charline Vann (born June 24, 1980) is an American actress and singer. She began her career on the Off-Broadway stage before starring in the WGN America period drama series Underground (2016–2017), for which she received NAACP Image Award nomination. She later starred as attorney Tegan Price in the ABC legal thriller series How to Get Away with Murder (2017–2020). In 2022, Vann starred in the period romantic drama film A Jazzman's Blues.

== Life and career ==
Amirah Charline Vann was born on June 24, 1980, in Queens, New York. Her father is African-American from Georgia, and her mother is Puerto Rican. Vann attended Midwood High School and then Far Rockaway High School, graduating in 1998. She then obtained her bachelor's degree from Fordham University in 2002, and a Masters of Fine Arts degree from New York University's Tisch School of the Arts in 2007. Vann worked for many years in Off-Broadway theater before transitioning to film and television.

Vann appeared in secondary roles in films, including And So It Goes and Tracers, before her breakthrough performance as Ernestine, the head house slave of the Macon plantation, in the WGN America period drama series Underground in 2016. At the 48th NAACP Image Awards, Vann received NAACP Image Award for Outstanding Supporting Actress in a Drama Series nomination for her performance. The series was canceled after two seasons in 2017. She later guest starred on Law & Order: Special Victims Unit, and had a recurring role on the final season of Major Crimes as Special Agent Jazzma Fey.

During the 2017–18 season, Vann was cast as attorney Tegan Price on the ABC legal drama How to Get Away with Murder. From a recurring role, Vann was promoted to series regular for season five and season six. In early 2018, Vann also went to star on the ABC drama pilot The Holmes Sisters produced by Regina King and Robin Roberts. Later that year, Vann also had a recurring role on the USA Network limited series Unsolved: The Murder of Tupac and The Notorious B.I.G. as an FBI agent assigned to the multi-agency taskforce assigned to the Christopher Wallace murder investigation. In 2019, Vann was cast as corporate lobbyist Parker Campbell in season four of the OWN drama Queen Sugar. She also had a supporting role in the 2019 drama film Miss Virginia. In 2020 she guest-starred in the CBS All Access series Star Trek: Picard.

In 2022, Vann starred in the period romantic drama film A Jazzman's Blues playing the role of singer Hattie Mae, mother of lead (played by Joshua Boone). The role originally was written for Diana Ross. Vann received positive reviews for her performance. The following year she had a recurring role in the AppleTV horror series The Changeling. She played actress Diahann Carroll in the biographical drama film Shirley about American politician Shirley Chisholm.

== Filmography ==
=== Film ===
Year	Title	Role	Notes
2006	Three and a Half Thoughts	Saidah	Short film
2009	Once More with Feeling	Bartender	
2011	First World Problem	Rosario Sanchez	
2013	80/20	Bonita	
2014	And So It Goes	Rashida	
2015	Tracers	Angie	
2015	Don't Worry Baby	Alison	
2016	The Hostess	Latoya Corbyn	Short film
2019	Miss Virginia	Shondae Smith	
2022	A Jazzman's Blues	Hattie Mae	
2024	Shirley	Diahann Carroll	

=== Television ===
Year	Title	Role	Notes
2013	Girls	Angry Lady	Episode: "Boys"
2014	Believe	Maid	Episode: "Origin"
2014	Mozart in the Jungle	Nurse	Episode: "Silent Symphony"
2016–2017	Underground	Ernestine	Main cast
2017	Law & Order: Special Victims Unit	Michelle Morrison	Episode: "Mood"
2017	Major Crimes	Special Agent Jazzma Fey	Recurring cast (season 6)
2017–2020	How to Get Away with Murder	Tegan Price	Recurring cast (season 4), main cast (Season 5-6), 37 episodes
2018	Unsolved	Justine Simon	Recurring cast
2019–2022	Queen Sugar	Parker Campbell	Guest (season 4-6), recurring cast (season 7)
2020	Star Trek: Picard	Zani	Episode: "Absolute Candor"
2020	The Fugitive	FBI Agent	Recurring cast
2021–2024	Arcane	Sevika (voice)	Recurring cast
2022	Bull	Paula Lamont	Episode: "The Other Shoe"
2023	The Changeling	Kim Valentine	Recurring cast
2025	Doc	Dr. Gina Walker	Main role

=== Web ===
Year	Title	Role	Notes	Source
2025	Talon	Fury		

== Awards and nominations ==
Year	Award	Category	Nominated work	Result
2017	48th NAACP Image Awards	Outstanding Supporting Actress in a Drama Series	Underground	Nominated
2023	54th NAACP Image Awards	Outstanding Ensemble Cast in a Motion Picture	A Jazzman's Blues	Nominated

== See also ==
- List of Afro-Latinos
