= Premature (2019 film) =

Film by Rashaad Ernesto Green

- Release poster
- Directed by: Rashaad Ernesto Green
- Written by: Rashaad Ernesto Green; Zora Howard
- Produced by: Joy Ganes; Rashaad Ernesto Green; Darren Dean
- Starring: Zora Howard; Joshua Boone; Michelle Wilson; Alexis Marie Wint; Imani Lewis; Tashiana Washington
- Cinematography: Laura Valladao
- Edited by: Justin Chan
- Music by: Patrick Cannell; Stefan Swanson
- Production companies: Mi Alma Films; Astute Films; Slice Entertainment Group; Relic Pictures
- Distributed by: IFC Films
- Release dates: January 27, 2019 (Sundance); February 21, 2020 (United States)
- Running time: 86 minutes
- Country: United States
- Language: English
- Box office: $23,071

Premature is a 2019 American romantic drama film directed by Rashaad Ernesto Green and written by Green and Zora Howard. The film stars Howard and Joshua Boone. The plot follows a teenager who has a summer romance with an older man. The film premiered at the Sundance Film Festival on January 26, 2019. It was released in select theaters and on video on demand in the United States on February 21, 2020, by IFC Films.

== Premise ==
IFC Films says in its official synopsis, "On a summer night in Harlem during her last months at home before starting college, seventeen-year-old poet Ayanna meets Isaiah, a charming music producer who has just moved to the city. It's not long before these two artistic souls are drawn together in a passionate summer romance. But as the highs of young love give way to jealousy, suspicion, and all-too-real consequences, Ayanna must confront the complexities of the adult world—whether she is ready or not."

== Cast ==
- Zora Howard as Ayanna
- Joshua Boone as Isaiah
- Michelle Wilson
- Alexis Marie Wint
- Imani Lewis
- Tashiana Washington
- Myha'la Herrold as Dymond
- Mackenzie Lansing as female student

== Production ==
Zora Howard co-wrote the film with director Rashaad Ernesto Green. Premature is his second feature film. The director of photography is Laura Valladao.

== Critical reception ==
On the review aggregator website Rotten Tomatoes, the film holds an approval rating of 93% based on 56 reviews, with an average rating is 7.7/10. The website's critics consensus reads, "Premature transcends its familiar trappings with sharp dialogue and a strong sense of setting that further establish Rashaad Ernesto Green as a gifted filmmaker." On Metacritic, which assigns a weighted average score out of 100 to reviews from mainstream critics, the film received an average score of 81 based on reviews from 13 critics, indicating "universal acclaim".

In a review for TheWrap, Candice Frederick stated, "The push and pull of Ayanna and Isaiah's relationship comes off naturally, thanks to Howard and Green's sensitive writing. That style carries over to Laura Valladao's equally raw cinematography, capturing the hot New York City summer from the almost dusty sidewalk pavements, to the fiery sunset over the park, and the intimacy of two vulnerable lovers in bed at night next to an open window." Jon Frosch wrote of Howard's performance in a review for The Hollywood Reporter, "What keeps you invested is Howard, who makes her proud, steely character's every moment of vulnerability feel like a gift to both the audience and to Isaiah, who may not be worthy of her. It's a performance that builds gradually in power and radiance." Odie Henderson of RogerEbert.com gave the film three out of four stars and wrote, "At times, Premature has the same fly-on-the-wall, near-improvisational and casually meandering qualities of a [John] Cassavetes film, though its refreshingly honest and direct depiction of Black sexuality made me think of early Spike Lee or Bill Gunn." Variety and The Washington Post also offered positive reviews.
