= Stew (play) =

2020 play by Zora Howard

STEW
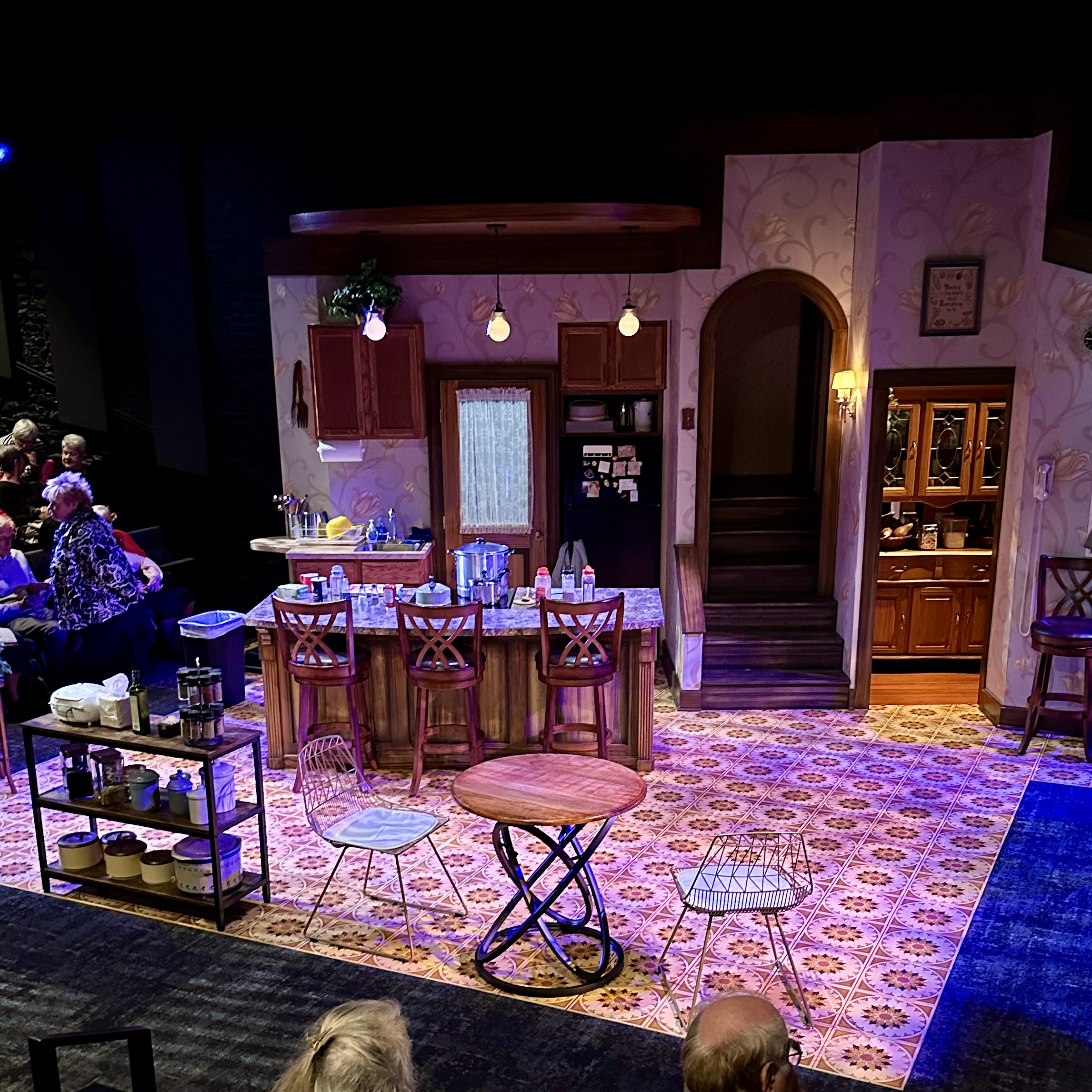
- Set at Playhouse in the Park in March 2024
- Written by: Zora Howard
- Characters: Mama; Lillian; Nelly; Li'l Mama
- Genre: Drama, comedy, tragedy
- Setting: The kitchen of a home in a city neighborhood in the 21st century

Premiere
- Date premiered: January 20, 2020
- Place premiered: Off-Broadway

Stew (stylized as STEW) is a 2020 play by Zora Howard, her first. It was a finalist for the 2021 Pulitzer Prize for Drama.

== Development ==
The play is Howard's first. It was workshopped in 2019 with Page 73 during a summer residency and with Collaborative Artists Bloc.

== Plot ==
The plot centers on the Tucker family, three generations of women grappling with their personal choices. Characters include Mama, the family matriarch, Nelly, a 17-year-old who lives with Mama, Mama's 30-something daughter Lillian, who is visiting with her preteen daughter Li'l Mama and her son Junior, who does not appear in the play. It takes place in Mama's kitchen.

Mama is making a stew for a church event later in the day that is very important to her, and the rest of the family is helping or keeping her company in the kitchen. The women are all stressed for various reasons—Mama because of the event and her health issues, Lillian because she is having marital issues, and Nelly because she is pregnant—and they bicker, sometimes comically. A loud bang is heard outside the house while all but Mama are sleeping, and Lillian, Nelly, and Li'l Mama run outside, concerned about Junior, while Mama, still inside stirring her pot, resigns herself to the worst. The play ends with the audience believing he has been shot.

== Reception ==
In a review for Vulture, Helen Shaw wrote, "Howard moves from broad strokes to ontological bewilderment almost before you know it...makes us hear hundreds of years of pain, knocking to be let in." For the Los Angeles Times, Charles McNulty wrote, "Howard has written a kitchen-sink drama with a difference. "Stew" is more concerned with pattern than plot. History is tracked in its path of repetition. The everyday sorrows, disappointments and hopes of three generations of Black women are chronicled. So too is their stamina to survive a world of economic hardship, emotional neglect and chronic violence." Elisabeth Vincentelli, writing in the New York Times, said "Howard can be a little heavy-handed when alluding to cycles that keep repeating: the marital frustration, Tucker women getting pregnant at 17."

The play was a finalist for the 2021 Pulitzer Prize for Drama. In 2023 Boston.com named it one of seven theatre performances to see that summer.

== Production history ==
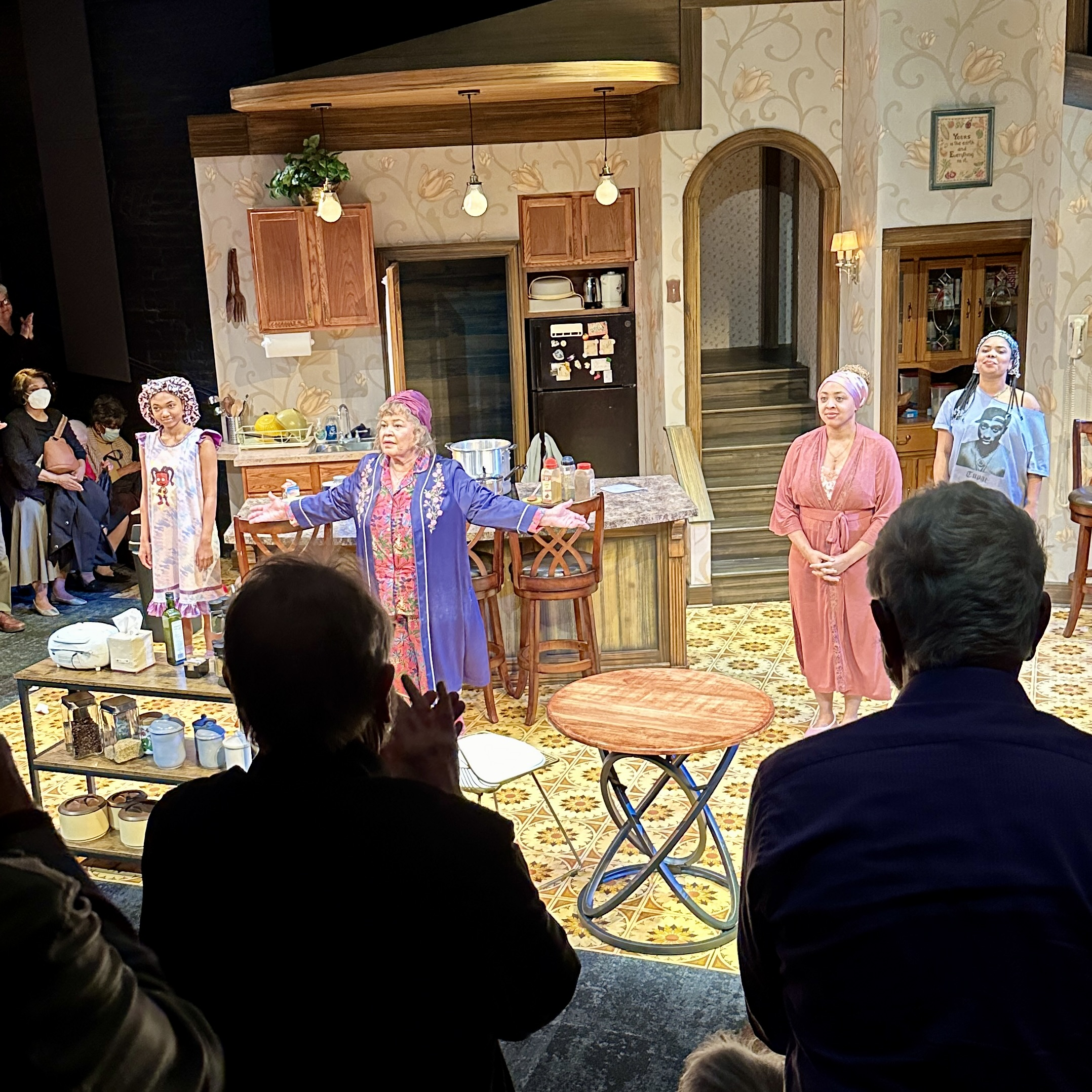
Michele Shay and cast at Playhouse in the Park in March of 2024

The play debuted in January 2020, staged by Page 73 Productions at Manhattan's Walkerspace with Portia as Mama and Nikkole Salter as Lillian, with Colette Robert directing. In 2022 it was staged by Shattered Globe at Chicago's Theater Wit directed by Malkia Stampley with Velma Austin as Mama and Jazzma Pryor as Lillian.

In 2023 it ran at the Pasadena Playhouse with LisaGay Hamilton as Mama, Roslyn Ruff as Lillian, and Tyler Thomas directing and at Boston's Gloucester Stage.

In 2024 it was produced by Cincinnati's Playhouse in the Park with Stori Ayers directing, Michele Shay as Mama, and Shayna Small as Lillian with other regional productions at ACT Theatre, Ebony Repertory Theatre, Scripps Ranch Community Theatre, and Theatre North.
