= Solea Pfeiffer =

American musical theater actress (born 1994)

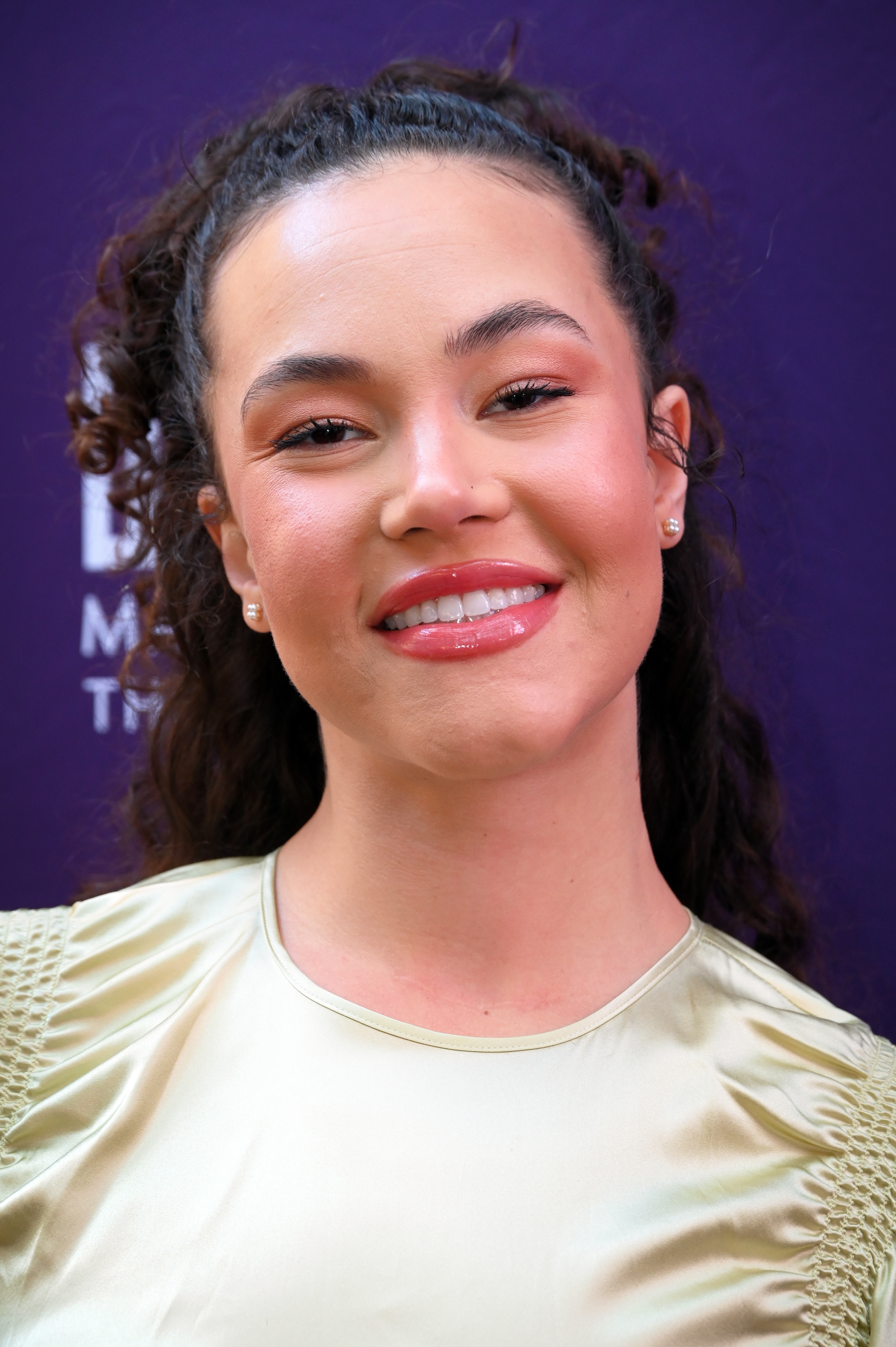
- Pfeiffer in 2026
- Born: September 22, 1994 (age 32); Zimbabwe
- Education: University of Michigan (BFA); Royal Academy of Dramatic Art
- Occupations: Actress; singer
- Years active: 2016–present

Solea Pfeiffer is a Zimbabwe-born American actress and singer. She is best known for her role as Eliza Hamilton in the first national tour of Hamilton, which she landed after performing as Maria in West Side Story at the Hollywood Bowl. In 2019, she starred in the New York City Center's production of Evita. Since then, she has joined the Broadway productions of Hadestown as Eurydice and Moulin Rouge! as Satine. In 2022, she played as one of the lead characters in Tyler Perry's movie A Jazzman's Blues.

== Life and career ==
Pfeiffer was born in Zimbabwe and grew up in Seattle, Washington. Her mother is African-American, and was adopted and raised in Boston, while her father is white. Her maternal grandfather was former congressman Ron Dellums; she and her mother were able to connect with him a year before he died. Her parents are anthropologists at the University of Washington. Pfeiffer graduated from University of Michigan with a BFA and attended the Royal Academy of Dramatic Art in London.

Pfeiffer began her interest in music by taking violin lessons at four years old. She attended theater camps and performed in her middle and high school productions.

In 2016, at 21 years old, Pfeiffer was selected by Gustavo Dudamel to perform as Maria in West Side Story at the Hollywood Bowl after the Los Angeles Philharmonic's artistic team showed him YouTube videos of her performing.

A year later, she made her national tour debut as Eliza Hamilton in the Angelica Company of Hamilton, earning positive reviews.

In 2019, Pfeiffer shared the role of Eva Perón with Maia Reficco in the New York City Center's production of Evita, Pfeiffer playing Perón from age 20–33. Pfeiffer earned positive reviews for her performance.

In 2022, she performed in Almost Famous as Penny Lane at the Bernard B. Jacobs Theater on Broadway. A year later, Pfeiffer starred in Hadestown on Broadway replacing Eva Noblezada as Eurydice at the Walter Kerr Theatre. During her run, she starred opposite Reeve Carney and Jordan Fisher as Orpheus.

In the summer of 2024, she starred as Myrtle Wilson in Florence Welch's Gatsby: An American Myth at the American Repertory Theatre. Later that same year, she joined the cast of Moulin Rouge! as Satine on Broadway at the Al Hirschfeld Theatre. She starred opposite John Cardoza and Fisher as Christian.

Pfeiffer is set to star in the upcoming Broadway musical Wanted: The Legend of the Sisters Clark as Mary Clarke, alongside actress Liisi Lafontaine as Martha Clarke. The show is scheduled to premiere on November 8, 2026, at the James Earl Jones Theater.

== Personal life ==
Since 2020, Pfeiffer has been in a relationship with actor Kevin Csolak.

== Credits ==
=== Filmography ===
Year	Title	Role	Notes
2017	Curb Your Enthusiasm	Eliza Hamilton	Episode: "The Shucker"
2018	Scandal	Meghan Seeley	Episode: "The List"
2019	The Good Fight	Enid Blyton	Episode: "The One Inspired by Roy Cohn"
2022	A Jazzman's Blues	Leanne	Nominated — NAACP Image Award for Outstanding Ensemble Cast in a Motion Picture

=== Stage ===
Year(s)	Production	Role	Location	Category
2015	Grease	Sandy Dumbrowski	5th Avenue Theatre	Seattle, Washington
2016	Guys and Dolls	Sarah Brown	Power Center for the Performing Arts	Ann Arbor, Michigan
2016	West Side Story	Maria	Hollywood Bowl	Los Angeles
2016	Sunday in the Park with George	Celeste #1 / A Waitress	New York City Center	Off-Broadway
2017	Hamilton	Eliza Hamilton	-	US National Tour
2017	Sondheim on Sondheim	Performer	Hollywood Bowl	Los Angeles
2018	Songs for a New World	Woman 1	New York City Center	Off-Broadway
2019	Camelot	Guenevere	Lincoln Center Theater	Benefit Concert
2019	Almost Famous	Penny Lane	The Old Globe	San Diego
2019	The Light in the Piazza	Clara Johnson	Civic Opera House	Chicago
2019	Evita	Eva Perón	New York City Center	Off-Broadway
2020	Gun & Powder	Mary Clarke	Signature Theatre	Arlington, VA
2021	Simply Sondheim		Signature Theatre	online
2022–2023	Almost Famous	Penny Lane	Bernard B. Jacobs Theater	Broadway
2022	Chess	Svetlana Sergievsky	Broadhurst Theatre	Benefit Concert
2023	Hamlet	Ophelia	Delacorte Theater	Shakespeare in the Park
2023–2024	Hadestown	Eurydice	Walter Kerr Theater	Broadway
2024	Gatsby: An American Myth	Myrtle Wilson	American Repertory Theatre	Regional
2024–2025	Moulin Rouge! The Musical	Satine	Al Hirschfeld Theatre	Broadway Nominated - Broadway.com Audience Choice Award for Best Replacement (Female)
2026	Wanted: The Legend of the Sisters Clarke	Mary Clarke	James Earl Jones Theatre	Broadway
