= Joshua Boone =

American actor

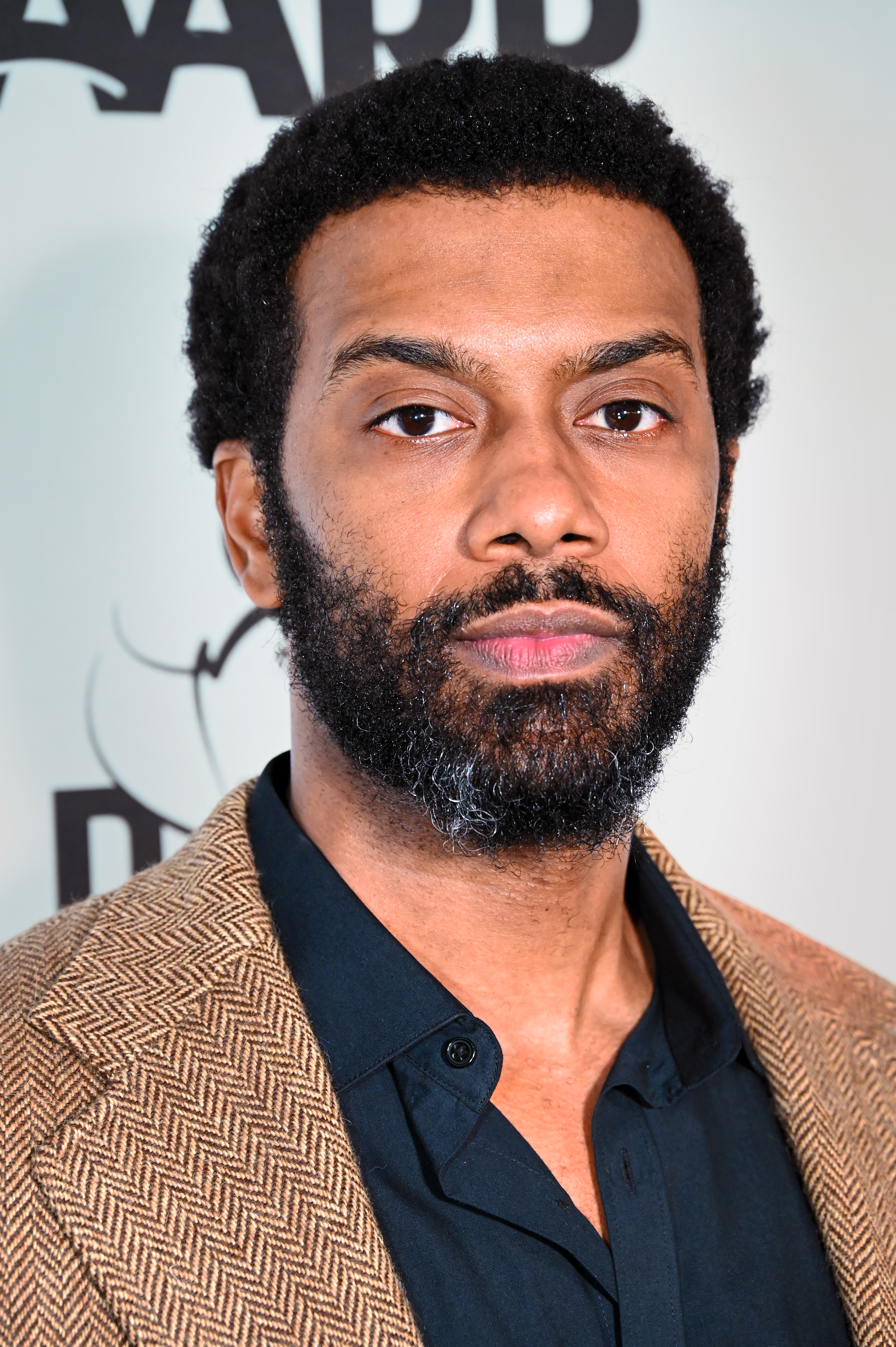
- Boone in 2026
- Education: Virginia Commonwealth University (BFA)
- Occupation: Actor
- Years active: 2014-present
- Notable work: The Outsiders

Joshua Boone is an American actor. He has acted frequently on Broadway, earning a nomination for Best Featured Actor in a Musical at the Tony Awards for his role as Dally in The Outsiders. He's also featured in productions of Holler if Ya Hear Me, Network, and Skeleton Crew. In Spring 2026, returned to Broadway in a revival of Joe Turner's Come and Gone as Herald Loomis.

Boone has also appeared on television and film. He starred in A Jazzman's Blues, which earned him NAACP Image Award nominations.

== Career ==
He starred opposite Zora Howard in the 2019 film Premature. For his performance in the 2022 Tyler Perry/Netflix film A Jazzman's Blues, Boone was nominated for two NAACP Image Awards.

Boone made his Broadway debut at the Palace Theatre in 2014, in the jukebox musical Holler If Ya Hear Me, based on the music of Tupac Shakur. He originated the role of Darius. The show closed after 38 performances.

In 2018, Boone played executive Frank Hackett in Network, which starred Bryan Cranston. In All the Natalie Portmans at the MCC Theater, he was the older brother of Kara Young's protagonist. The play, which opened on February 24, 2020, closed on March 12, 2020 due to COVID-19 protocols in New York. He also featured in the 2022 Broadway production of Skeleton Crew. Variety reviewer Ayanna Prescod praised his performance as Dez. Boone also received a Drama Desk nomination for Outstanding Featured Actor in a Play.

Starting in March 2024, he played Dallas “Dally” Winston in the musical The Outsiders. He was introduced to the production by his friend Brody Grant, who originated the role of Ponyboy. In a review for Time Out, Adam Feldman praised his performance as "excellent". Jesse Green wrote that he acted as a "scary alpha". The role earned Boone a nomination for the Tony Award for Best Featured Actor in a Musical. He left the production in late January 2025.

Boone returned to Broadway in April 2026 in a revival of Joe Turner's Come and Gone, directed by Debbie Allen. He played the role of Herald Loomis, originated on Broadway by Delroy Lindo in 1988. Sara Holdren wrote for New York that he was "the smoldering coal" of the play who "goes to places at once frightening and devastating." In a critical review of the play for The New York Post, Johnny Oleksinski wrote Boone was a "frightening livewire", but that the directorial emphasis on the character's ferocity overshadowed the rest of the play.

== Personal life ==
Boone was born in Portsmouth, Virginia. In 2010, he graduated from Virginia Commonwealth University School of the Arts with a BFA in Theatre Performance; he returned as commencement speaker to the class of 2024.

== Filmography ==
=== Film ===
Year	Title	Role	Notes
2012	Journeymen	Booby	Short film
2013	Dyce and Devil	Dyce	Short film
2015	Brooklove	Ian	Short film
2019	Premature	Isaiah	
2020	Wheels	Terry	
2021	Mother's Milk	Sparrow	
2022	A Jazzman's Blues	Bayou	

=== Television ===
Year	Title	Role	Notes
2013	Law & Order: Special Victims Unit	Willie	1 episode
2013	The Big Gulp	Unknown	1 episode
2014	Downtown Girls	Quentin	1 episode
2015	Fan Girl	Darvan	TV movie
2016	MacGyver	Gunner/Hunter	1 episode
2017	Salamander	Craig Anders	TV movie
2018	Seven Seconds	Khalil	1 episode

=== Stage ===
Year	Title	Role	Theatre	Notes
2012	In the Heights	Benny	Pioneer Theatre Company	Regional
2014	Holler If Ya Hear Me	Darius	Palace Theatre	Broadway
2015-2016	Mother Courage and Her Children	Recruiting Officer / Soldier	Classic Stage Company	Off-Broadway
2018-2019	Network	Frank Hackett	Belasco Theatre	Broadway
2021-2022	Skeleton Crew	Dez	Samuel J. Friedman Theatre	Broadway; Drama Desk nominee
2024-2025	The Outsiders	Dallas "Dally" Winston	Bernard B. Jacobs Theatre	Broadway; Tony nominee; Drama Desk nominee
