= How to Get Away with Murder =

2014 American legal thriller television series

- Genre: Legal drama; Mystery
- Created by: Peter Nowalk
- Showrunner: Peter Nowalk
- Starring: Viola Davis; Billy Brown; Alfred Enoch; Jack Falahee; Katie Findlay; Aja Naomi King; Matt McGorry; Karla Souza; Charlie Weber; Liza Weil; Conrad Ricamora; Rome Flynn; Amirah Vann; Timothy Hutton
- Composer: Photek
- Country of origin: United States
- Original language: English
- No. of seasons: 6
- No. of episodes: 90 (list of episodes)

Production
- Executive producers: Shonda Rhimes; Betsy Beers; Bill D'Elia; Peter Nowalk
- Producers: Scott Collins; Tracy Bellomo; Viola Davis
- Cinematography: Michael Price; Jeff Jur
- Editors: David Greenspan; Philip Carr Neel; Julia Grove; Matthew Ramsey
- Camera setup: Single-camera
- Running time: 43 minutes
- Production companies: Shondaland; Nowalk Entertainment; ABC Studios

Original release
- Network: ABC
- Release: September 25, 2014 – May 14, 2020

How to Get Away with Murder is an American legal drama thriller television series that premiered on the American Broadcasting Company (ABC) on September 25, 2014, and concluded on May 14, 2020. The series was created by Peter Nowalk and produced by Shonda Rhimes and ABC Studios, airing as part of a night of programming under Rhimes' Shondaland production company.

The show stars Viola Davis as Annalise Keating, a defense attorney and law professor at a prestigious Philadelphia university, who, along with five of her students, becomes involved in a complex murder plot. The series features an ensemble cast including Alfred Enoch, Jack Falahee, Aja Naomi King, Matt McGorry, and Karla Souza as Annalise's students, Charlie Weber and Liza Weil as her employees, and Billy Brown as a detective with the Philadelphia Police Department and Annalise's lover. Beginning with the third season, Conrad Ricamora was promoted to the main cast after recurring in the first two seasons, while Rome Flynn, Amirah Vann and Timothy Hutton were promoted to the main cast in the fifth season.

Davis received widespread critical acclaim for her performance in the series: she became the first Black woman to win a Primetime Emmy Award for Outstanding Lead Actress in a Drama Series, also winning two Screen Actors Guild Award for Outstanding Performance by a Female Actor in a Drama Series, and the Image Award for Outstanding Actress in a Drama Series. Davis also received nominations from the Golden Globe Awards for Best Actress in a Television Series, the Critics' Choice Awards for Best Actress in a Drama Series, and the Television Critics Association at the TCA Awards for Individual Achievement in Drama.

Other cast members also received recognition for their performances, with Enoch and King receiving nominations from the NAACP Image Awards for Outstanding Supporting Actor in a Drama Series and Outstanding Supporting Actress in a Drama Series at the 2014 NAACP Image Awards ceremony. The series also received a GLAAD Media Award for Outstanding Drama Series.

== Series overview ==
Season	Episodes	Originally released		Rank	Viewers (in millions)
Season	Episodes	First released	Last released	Rank	Viewers (in millions)
1	15	September 25, 2014	February 26, 2015	30	11.40
2	15	September 24, 2015	March 17, 2016	32	10.26
3	15	September 22, 2016	February 23, 2017	44	7.91
4	15	September 28, 2017	March 15, 2018	64	6.42
5	15	September 27, 2018	February 28, 2019	85	5.15
6	15	September 26, 2019	May 14, 2020	84	4.27

=== Season 1 (2014–15) ===
Annalise Keating is a prominent criminal defense attorney and law professor at Middleton University in Philadelphia. She selects five of her first year students to intern at her firm: Wes Gibbins, Connor Walsh, Michaela Pratt, Asher Millstone, and Laurel Castillo (The Keating 5). They work with Annalise's employees, Frank Delfino and Bonnie Winterbottom, an associate lawyer. As the first season introduces occasional clients for Keating, it explores two related murders through both flashback and flashforward sequences: Lila Stangard, mistress of Annalise's husband and a student at Middleton, and then Sam Keating, Annalise's husband, who was killed by Annalise's interns.

The first nine episodes alternate between the present-day timeline in medias res, depicting Wes, Connor, Michaela, and Laurel covering up Sam's murder by disposing of his body, and flashbacks detailing the course of events leading up to Sam's death, including Annalise's becoming involved in the Lila Stangard investigation, at Wes' urging, leading her to discover Sam's affair and creating suspicion that he killed Lila. The final six episodes explore Annalise's attempt to help her interns cover up Sam's murder and legally implicate Sam in Lila's death, and flashbacks to Lila's final moments before her murder.

=== Season 2 (2015–16) ===
The first nine episodes focus on Annalise's defense of Caleb and Catherine Hapstall, who are accused of torturing and murdering their adoptive parents. Wes, in the meantime, teams up with Rebecca's foster brother to try and find Rebecca. Connor struggles with his relationship with Oliver, while Asher works with assistant district attorney Emily Sinclair, in order to protect his secrets. In the mid-season finale, Sinclair is murdered by Asher, and Annalise helps cover it up, at the expense of her being shot in the stomach by Wes.

The second part of the season focuses on Wes' investigation of his mother's suicide ten years prior; flashbacks reveal Annalise's involvement with Wes' mother's suicide. The season ends with Annalise's finding out that Frank was responsible for the car accident that killed her baby, and Annalise sending him away. Michaela and Asher hook up, and Wes meets with his biological father right before the latter is shot dead by an unknown shooter.

=== Season 3 (2016–17) ===
In the aftermath of Wallace Mahoney's death, all five of the students attempt to move on. A new mystery arises around the burning down of Annalise's house and who was found dead inside. The events leading up to it involve Annalise's starting a free legal clinic and struggling with alcoholism. Oliver starts working for Annalise, and he leaves Connor when becoming disgusted with himself for rejecting Connor's Stanford acceptance. Michaela and Asher's romantic relationship starts to progress, as does Wes and Laurel's, and Frank starts working to atone for the death of Annalise's child. Ultimately, it is revealed that it was Wes who died, and that he was killed before the fire. Annalise is arrested for Wes' death. Frank attempts to help Annalise by confessing to killing Wes. It is further revealed that Wes is killed by Dominic, an enforcer working for Laurel's father. It is hinted that her father disapproved of the relationship between his daughter and Wes.

=== Season 4 (2017–18) ===
In the fourth season, Annalise works with a therapist, Dr. Isaac Roa, to see through her recovery from alcoholism. She initially cuts ties with Bonnie (who moves to the DA's office as an assistant district attorney reporting to DA Todd Denver) and the interns, gets a woman with a long rap sheet freed from jail, and then commits to a major class action against the state for miscarriages of justice caused by an underfunded public defender's office. Laurel deduces that her father, Jorge Castillo, is responsible for Wes' murder and hatches a scheme to steal incriminating evidence from his law firm with the help of Michaela, Oliver, Frank, and Asher. During the data heist, their classmate Simon (Behzad Dabu) accidentally shoots himself with Laurel's gun, leading to Asher's arrest, and Laurel goes into premature labor after being accidentally struck by Frank. Annalise successfully saves the baby. However, Jorge claims custody of his grandchild by submitting evidence of Laurel's past addictions and history of mental illness to a judge. Laurel's mother arrives unexpectedly to "help" Laurel fight against her father, and Frank and Bonnie uncover a mysterious link between Laurel's mother and both Wes and his killer, Dominic. Meanwhile, Annalise searches for alternative ways to win her class action lawsuit. On January 3, 2018, a crossover with Scandal was announced, which aired on March 1, 2018, related with the presentation of the class action lawsuit by Annalise to the Supreme Court in Washington, D.C., with the help of the Scandal characters.

=== Season 5 (2018–19) ===
On May 11, 2018, ABC renewed the series for a fifth season, which premiered on September 27, 2018.

After Annalise's class-action victory in the Supreme Court, she and her associates seek to start a new chapter in their lives. Annalise starts working at Caplan & Gold so she can use their resources for her class-action cases, while also working back at Middleton. Connor, Michaela, Asher and Laurel begin their third year at law school, and a new student, Gabriel Maddox joins the group in Annalise's class. Meanwhile, Frank tries to find out the real reason Maddox came to Middleton in the first place, and Asher joins Bonnie at the DA's office as he gets an internship there. At the same time, Connor and Oliver also start planning their wedding, which is seen through new flashforwards that reveal a new murder committed. Governor Birkhead is behind the witch-hunt against Annalise.

=== Season 6 (2019–20) ===
In May 2019, ABC ordered a sixth season of How to Get Away with Murder. In July, it was announced the sixth season would be the last. Season 6 premiered on September 26, 2019.

Following Laurel and Christopher's disappearances and the death of Emmett Crawford at the previous season's end, Annalise goes on a bender and disappears into rehab out of guilt. After coming to terms with her past misdeeds, she returns just in time to help her remaining star students push through their final semester of law school and try and find Laurel and Christopher. Meanwhile, Michaela, Connor, and Asher continue to search for their friend and her son while preparing for graduation and the real world. However, everyone comes on high alert when the FBI, at behest of Governor Birkhead, open an investigation into Annalise, her students, and her associates, and every murder and misdeed over the last six seasons is put out in the open, forcing them to make drastic choices for survival that will change their lives, relationships, and futures forever.

== Cast and characters ==
- Viola Davis as Annalise Keating, a prominent criminal defense attorney and law professor at Middleton University, whose life has been filled with trauma.
- Billy Brown as Nate Lahey, a Philadelphia police detective who at the beginning of the series is having an affair with Annalise.
- Alfred Enoch as Wes Gibbins (seasons 1–3; guest seasons 4 & 6), a law student and a member of Annalise's group of favored students – the so-called Keating 5 – and about whom she feels especially protective. Enoch also played Christopher Castillo, Wes and Laurel's son, in the series finale.
- Jack Falahee as Connor Walsh, a cunning and hard-working member of the Keating 5 whose confident and seductive "alpha gay" exterior obscures his insecurities.
- Katie Findlay as Rebecca Sutter (season 1; guest season 2), Wes' neighbor.
- Aja Naomi King as Michaela Pratt, a high-flying overachiever and a member of the Keating 5 who is determined to make a success of her life.
- Matt McGorry as Asher Millstone, a member of the Keating 5 from a privileged WASP background who feels left out of the group.
- Karla Souza as Laurel Castillo (seasons 1–5; recurring season 6), a resourceful Keating 5 member whose distant, wealthy father is the kingpin of an organized crime empire.
- Charlie Weber as Frank Delfino, Annalise's fixer and private detective.
- Liza Weil as Bonnie Winterbottom, Annalise's associate and right-hand woman, whose childhood and early adulthood were filled with horrifying events.
- Conrad Ricamora as Oliver Hampton (seasons 3–6; recurring seasons 1–2), a talented computer hacker whom Connor seduces and later marries.
- Rome Flynn as Gabriel Maddox (seasons 5–6; guest season 4), a mysterious young man and aspiring civil rights lawyer who arrives at Middleton University eager to investigate Annalise and the Keating 5.
- Amirah Vann as Tegan Price (seasons 5–6; recurring season 4), a powerful attorney at Caplan & Gold, the firm representing Laurel's father, who develops feelings for Annalise.
- Timothy Hutton as Emmett Crawford (season 5), a managing partner at Caplan & Gold who develops an attraction towards Annalise.

== Production ==
=== Development ===
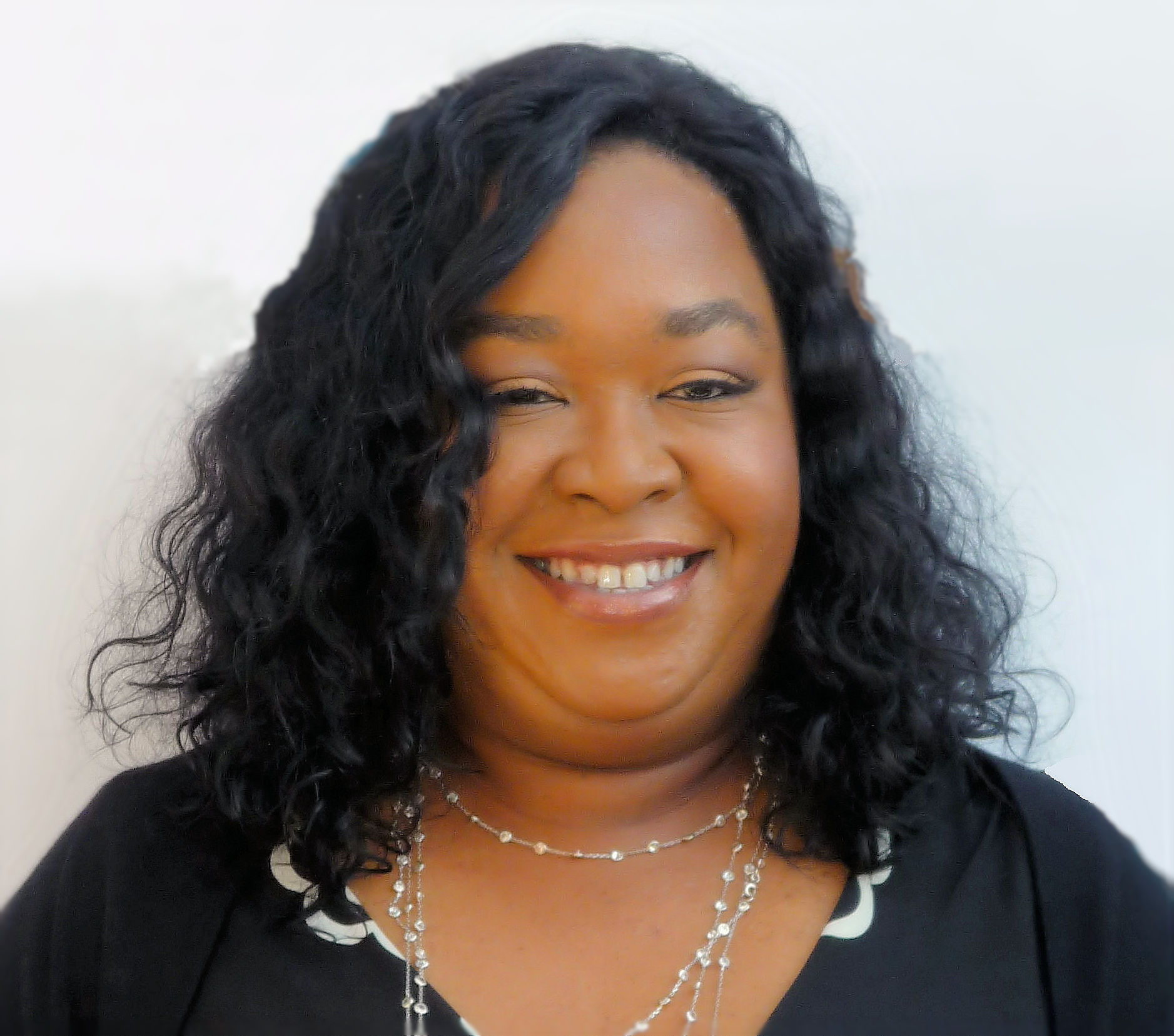
Shonda Rhimes, co-executive producer of How to Get Away with Murder

On August 19, 2013, ABC bought from Shondaland Productions the original concept, produced by Shonda Rhimes and Betsy Beers. The script for the pilot episode was written by Grey's Anatomy supervising producer Peter Nowalk. ABC ordered the pilot on December 19, 2013. On May 8, 2014, ABC picked up the pilot to series for the 2014–15 television season. At the Television Critics Association Press Tour in July 2014, it was announced that How to Get Away with Murder would be a limited series with only 15 or 16 episodes per season. The smaller size of episode count stems from the deal for the series star Viola Davis. On October 9, 2014, ABC picked up the series for a full season of 15 episodes.

The series was renewed for a second season on May 7, 2015, by ABC. The series was effectively confirmed as earning a second-season renewal for the 2015–16 season via a promo succeeding the first-season finale and an earlier statement by Viola Davis also confirming the renewal at the close of shooting for the first season. It would contain 15 episodes, like the previous season. Production began on May 21, 2015, with Shonda Rhimes announcing on Twitter that Peter Nowalk and his writers were in full swing mapping the second season. The table read for the premiere occurred on July 14, 2015, with the title of the episode being revealed at the same time. Entertainment Weekly reported on July 23, 2015, that the identity of Rebecca's killer would be revealed in the season premiere. A promotional poster was released over a month before the season premiere, on August 17, 2015.

The series was renewed for a third season on March 3, 2016, along with several other series by ABC. It was announced that the third season would premiere on September 22, 2016. Production began on May 27, 2016, when showrunner Peter Nowalk announced on Twitter that the writer staff were in full swing mapping and writing the third season. The table read for the premiere happened on July 6, 2016, with filming starting a week later. A promotional poster showcasing Viola Davis as Annalise Keating, was released on August 9, 2016. ABC released a promo for the third season on August 29, 2016.

The series was renewed for a fourth season on February 10, 2017, by ABC.

The series was renewed for a fifth season on May 11, 2018, by ABC, which premiered on September 27, 2018.

On May 10, 2019, the series was renewed for a sixth season which premiered on September 26, 2019. On July 11, 2019, it was reported that the sixth season would be the final season.

=== Writing ===
In an interview with Entertainment Weekly, showrunner Peter Nowalk talked about what would happen in the third season regarding Frank's disappearance; he commented: "Yes, I can see the three-piece suits and the hair product all falling apart. It's more what Frank feels about himself". When talking about the trust between Annalise and Frank, Nowalk said: "...Frank has two choices: To run away and hope she never catches him, just to cut bait; or he can try to win his way back. That's a long road". Charlie Weber commented on Frank's whereabouts as he said to Entertainment Weekly "I think he's hiding, and I think he's alone. If he does have a lifeline, I don't think it's Laurel".

Regarding Laurel, Nowalk said that Laurel's backstory with her family would be explored in the upcoming season, "I feel like it's very present. The promise of our show is that we won't dangle things out too long. The likelihood is yes. We've raised that question too many times not to answer it sooner than later". Michaela's backstory would also be explored as Nowalk said "We have so much to explore with her. Aja is so talented. I'm just excited to really delve into her personal life next year". Talking to The Hollywood Reporter, Nowalk stated that the series would explore both Annalise and Nate's relationship and both their families.

Cast members of season 4, from left to right: Matt McGorry, Aja Naomi King, Karla Souza, Conrad Ricamora, Jack Falahee, Viola Davis, Charlie Weber, Liza Weil, and Billy Brown

=== Casting ===
On January 21, 2014, Matt McGorry was the first to be announced as a regular cast member, playing a law student. Throughout February and March 2014, other roles were announced as cast: Aja Naomi King, Jack Falahee, Alfred Enoch and Karla Souza as law students; Katie Findlay as a drug-dealing student; Charlie Weber as a law associate to Professor Keating; Billy Brown as Professor Keating's extra-marital love interest; veteran actor and producer Tom Verica as Professor Keating's husband; and Liza Weil as one of the professor's two associates.

On February 25, 2014, it was announced that Shonda Rhimes had cast Viola Davis in the series' leading role of Professor Annalise Keating. On August 11, 2014, it was announced that Orange Is the New Black alum Alysia Reiner had joined the cast as a prosecutor who would be going up against Annalise. On November 4, 2014, it was announced that Oscar winner Marcia Gay Harden had joined the cast in the second half of the first season for a recurring role. On December 15, 2014, it was announced that Oscar nominee and Emmy winner Cicely Tyson would appear in an episode in the second half of the season.

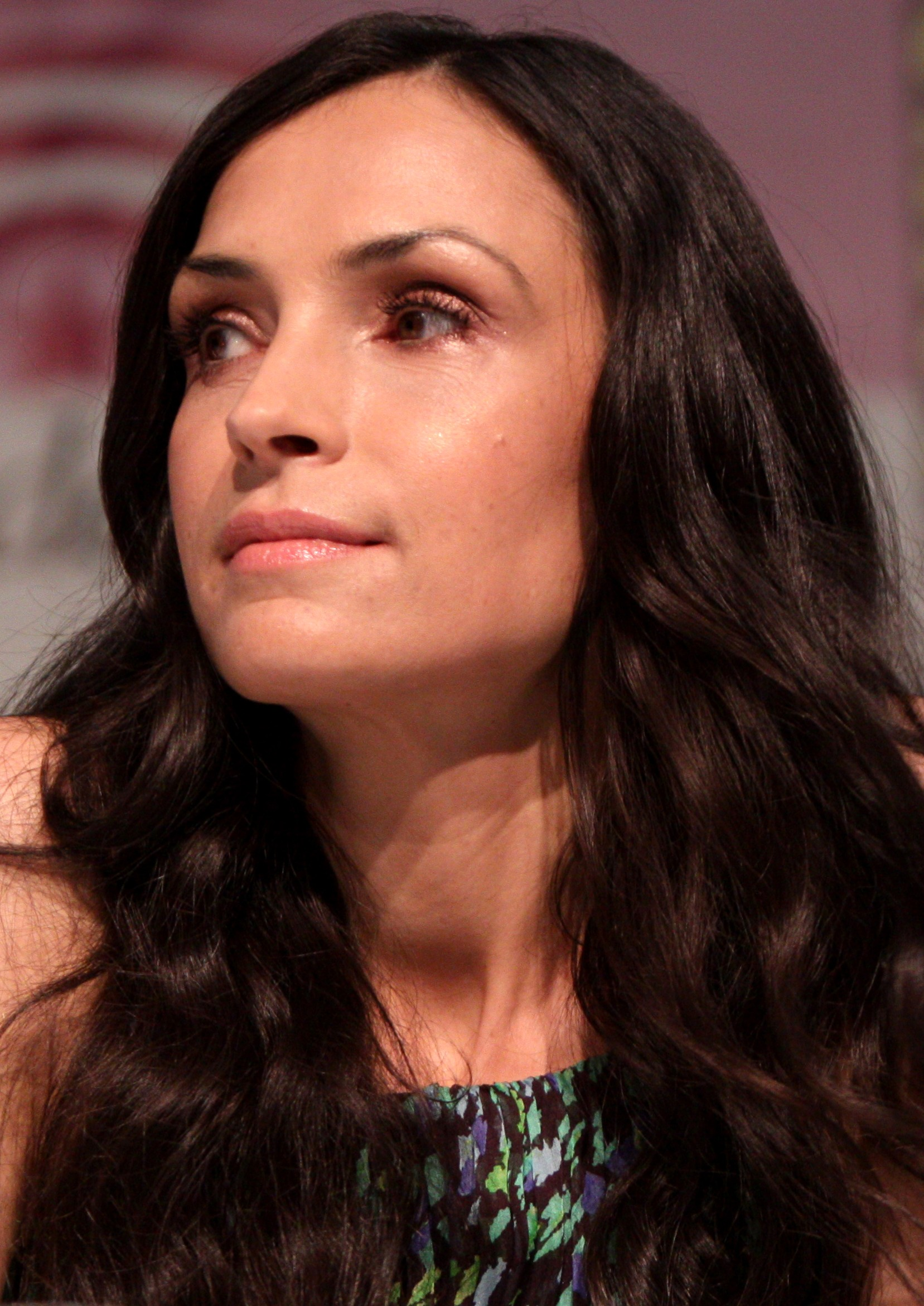
In 2015, Famke Janssen joined the cast as defense attorney Eve Rothlo, receiving critical acclaim for her performance.

It was announced on July 14, 2015, that the second season would introduce several new characters, including a family consisting of Caleb, Catherine and Helena Hapstall. Katie Findlay would return to play the character Rebecca Sutter, who was killed in the first-season finale. On July 22, 2015, it was announced that Kendrick Sampson, known from The Vampire Diaries would join the cast in the second season and be introduced in the season premiere. On July 31, 2015, it was announced that Famke Janssen had joined the cast as a brilliant, revered defense attorney for a multi-episode arc and would first appear in the season premiere.

Matt Cohen was announced on August 11, 2015, to recur in the second season as Levi Wescott, who is described as a sexy, edgy working class guy. On August 31, 2015, Variety reported that Amy Okuda would play a recurring role, but details on Okuda's part were being kept under wraps. Sherri Saum was announced to have been cast as a guest star on September 30, 2015. On January 14, 2016, it was announced that Wilson Bethel, Adam Arkin, and Roxanne Hart would be joining the series to play the Mahoney family. Bethel would play Charles Mahoney, the Ivy League-educated son, with Arkin playing his father Wallace and Hart playing his mother Sylvia.

After the second-season finale, it was announced that Dexter alum Lauren Vélez had joined the cast in a recurring role as the President of Middleton University. The role was described as "self-assured, friendly, warm and diplomatic". On August 6, 2016, it was announced that Esai Morales and Amy Madigan had joined the cast as guest stars for the third season. Deadline announced on August 31, 2016, that Mary J. Blige had landed a guest role in the third season.

On June 7, 2018, it was announced that Rome Flynn, who made a cameo appearance as Gabriel Maddox at the end of the fourth-season finale, was promoted to regular status for the upcoming fifth season. On July 18, it was reported that Amirah Vann, who recurred as Tegan Price during the fourth season, would also join the regular cast for the fifth season. On July 30, 2018, it was announced that Timothy Hutton had joined the main cast for the fifth season.

=== Filming ===
The pilot episode was filmed in Los Angeles, California, at the University of Southern California; in Philadelphia, Pennsylvania; in Bryn Mawr, Pennsylvania, at Bryn Mawr College; and in Collegeville, Pennsylvania, at Ursinus College. It was directed by Michael Offer. Production began on May 21, 2015, with Shonda Rhimes announcing on Twitter that Peter Nowalk and his writers were in full swing mapping the second season. The table read for the premiere occurred on July 14, 2015, with the title of the episode being revealed at the same time.

== Reception ==
=== Critical response ===
Critical response of How to Get Away with Murder
Season	Rotten Tomatoes	Metacritic
1	84% (56 reviews)	68 (30 reviews)
2	93% (87 reviews)	—N/a
3	90% (30 reviews)	—N/a
4	100% (8 reviews)	—N/a
5	86% (7 reviews)	—N/a
6	80% (5 reviews)	—N/a

The first season of How to Get Away with Murder received positive reviews, with most praising Viola Davis' performance. On Rotten Tomatoes, it has an approval rating of 85% based on 56 reviews, with an average rating of 7.11/10. The site's critical consensus reads, "How to Get Away with Murder isn't conceptually original, but it delivers thrills with melodramatic twists and a captivating lead". Metacritic gave the first season a score of 68 out of 100, based on 30 critics, indicating "generally favorable reviews".

Mary McNamara from Los Angeles Times wrote about Viola Davis' performance: "...all eyes are on Davis, Tony winner and Oscar nominee. Magnetic and intimidating, Davis creates an implacable surface beneath which shimmers all manner of fleet and startled emotions. Desire and fear, certainty, self-doubt and resolve are conjured in an instant with the angle of a glance, the lowering of an eyelid and then released as if they were never there". Entertainment Weekly's Melissa Maerz described Davis' performance as "powerfully layered". David Hinckle, from New York Daily News, said that the series serves up enough fun just like Rhimes' other series, Grey's Anatomy and Scandal. Frazier Moore, Associated Press, wrote that the series "promises to be twisty, wicked, dark and fun. And it stars Viola Davis, who brings life to a character of endless calculations and mystery".

The second season also received positive reviews. On Rotten Tomatoes, it has an approval rating of 93% based on 87 reviews, with an average rating of 8.19/10. The site's critical consensus reads: "Developing a stronger narrative this season, How to Get Away with Murder throws more improbable shocks and higher stakes into the mix, adding preposterous fuel to an addictive fire". Lesley Brock, Paste Magazine, praised the second season writing: "I would not put it past How to Get Away with Murder, which has turned all other ABC show plot lines upside down on their heads and shown that nothing is impossible, to throw incest into an already haphazard mix". Brock gave the season a score of 9 out of 10. Kyle Anderson, Entertainment Weekly, wrote that with Davis at the front the series can get away with anything.

The third season, once again, also received positive reviews. On Rotten Tomatoes, it has a rating of 90% based on 30 reviews, with an average rating of 7.52/10. The site's critical consensus reads: "Tense and taut, How to Get Away with Murder continues to step-up its game."

==== Critics' top ten lists ====
2014
- No. 9 The Salt Lake Tribune
- No. 1 People Magazine
- No. 9 Us Weekly
- No. 10 Pittsburgh Post-Gazette
- – The Globe and Mail
- – American Film Institute

2015
- No. 10 TVLine

=== Ratings ===
The series pilot on September 25 set a record for DVR playback viewers with 6 million, surpassing the January 27, 2014, record of 5.6 million set by the pilot of The Blacklist. The series premiere had more than 14 million viewers on live broadcast, and over 20 million with DVR.

Season	Timeslot (ET)	Number of Episodes	Premiere		Finale		TV Season	Overall rank	18–49 rank	Overall viewership
Season	Timeslot (ET)	Number of Episodes	Date	Viewers (millions)	Date	Viewers (millions)	TV Season	Overall rank	18–49 rank	Overall viewership
1	Thursdays; 10:00 pm	15	September 25, 2014	14.12	February 26, 2015	8.99	2014–15	#30	#12	11.40
2	Thursdays; 10:00 pm	15	September 24, 2015	8.38	March 17, 2016	5.29	2015–16	#32	#9	10.26
3	Thursdays; 10:00 pm	15	September 22, 2016	5.11	February 23, 2017	4.92	2016–17	#44	#15	7.91
4	Thursdays; 10:00 pm	15	September 28, 2017	3.96	March 15, 2018	3.83	2017–18	#64	#26	6.42
5	Thursdays; 10:00 pm	15	September 27, 2018	2.93	February 28, 2019	2.76	2018–19	#85	#40	5.15
6	Thursdays; 10:00 pm	15	September 26, 2019	2.43	May 14, 2020	3.20	2019–20	#79	#49	4.27

=== Accolades ===
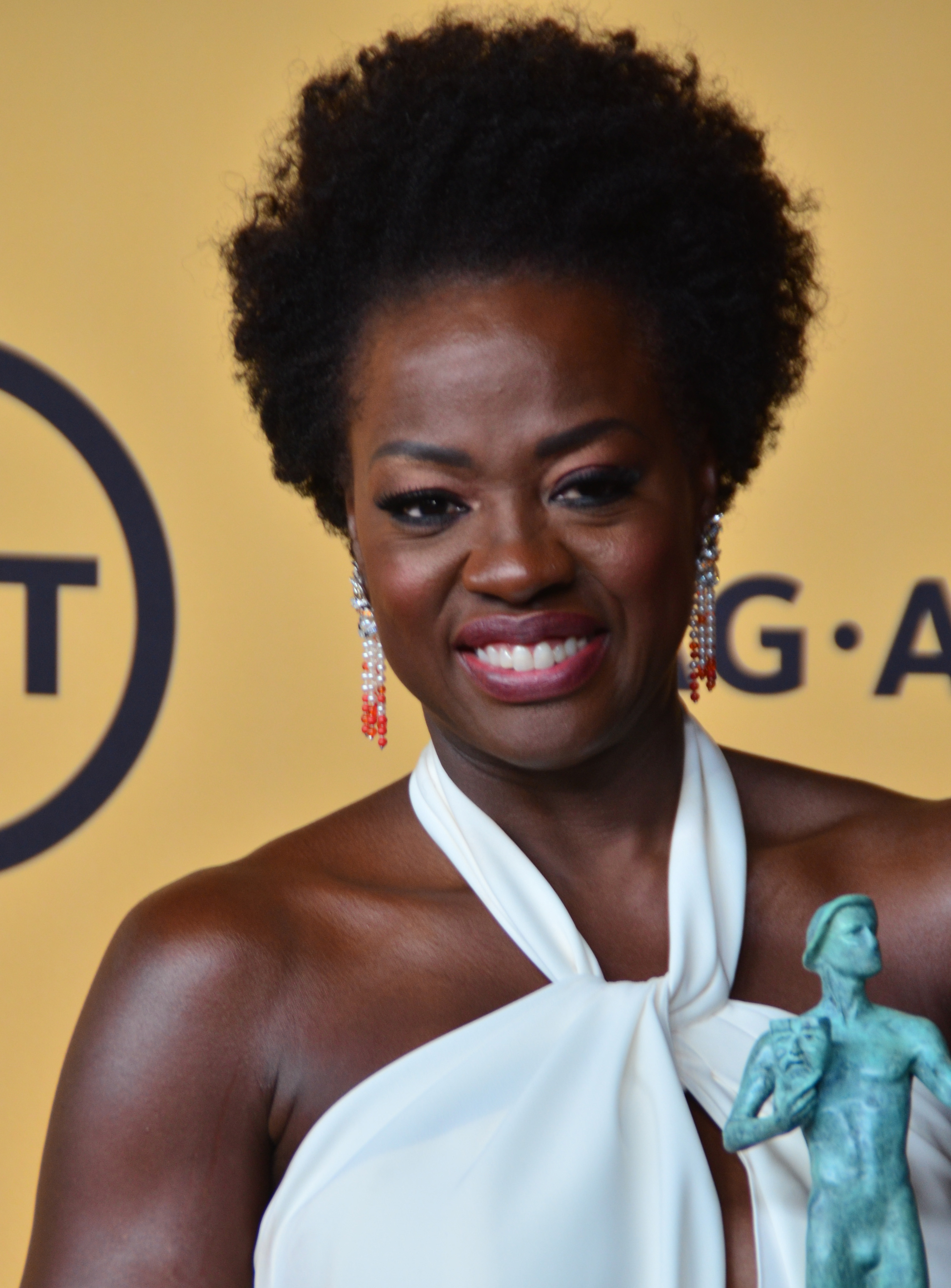
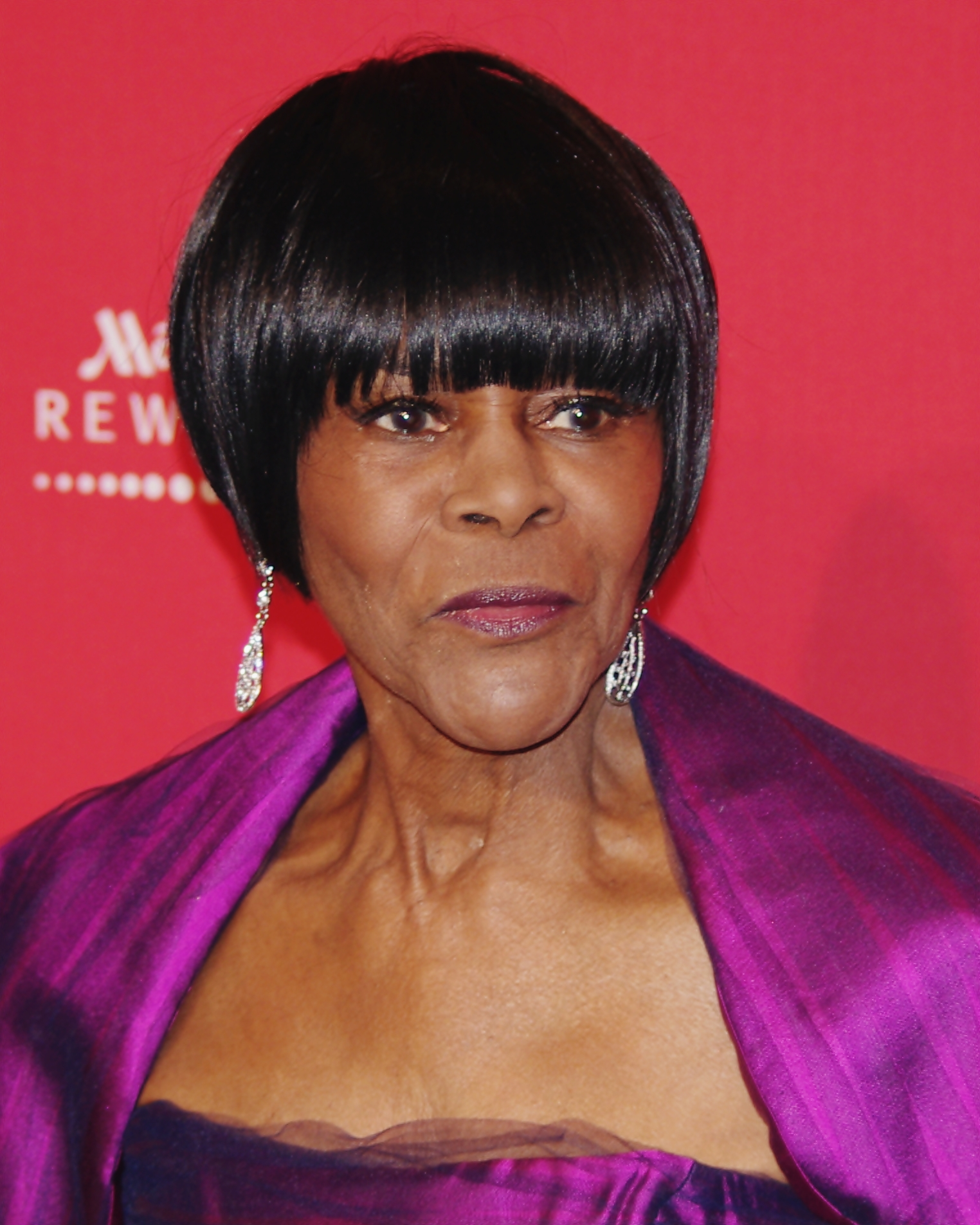
Both Davis (left) and Tyson (right) received critical acclaim for their performances.

The first season of the series was awarded Television Program of the Year by the American Film Institute and won Outstanding Drama Series at the 46th NAACP Image Awards and 26th GLAAD Media Awards. The series was also nominated for Favorite New TV Drama at the 41st People's Choice Awards and TV Drama of the Year at the GALECA awards. In 2016 the second season was nominated for Outstanding Drama Series at the 47th NAACP Image Awards, Favorite Network TV Drama at the 42nd People's Choice Awards and Outstanding Drama Series at the 27th GLAAD Media Awards.

Viola Davis became the first black woman to win a Primetime Emmy Award for Outstanding Lead Actress in a Drama Series, also winning two trophies each at the Screen Actors Guild Awards for Outstanding Performance by a Female Actor in a Drama Series and the NAACP Image Awards for Outstanding Actress in a Drama Series. Davis also received nominations from the Golden Globe Awards for Best Actress in a Television Series, the Critics' Choice Awards for Best Actress in a Drama Series, and the Television Critics Association at the TCA Awards for Individual Achievement in Drama. Other cast members have also received recognition for their performances, with Alfred Enoch and Aja Naomi King being nominated by the NAACP as Outstanding Supporting Actor in a Drama Series and Outstanding Supporting Actress in a Drama Series at the NAACP Image Awards. Cicely Tyson was nominated five times for Outstanding Guest Actress at the Primetime Emmy Awards for her work on the series. Glynn Turman was nominated for Outstanding Guest Actor at the 71st Primetime Emmy Awards.

Year	Association	Category	Nominee(s)	Result	Ref.
2014	American Film Institute Awards	Television Program of the Year	How to Get Away with Murder	Won	
2015	BET Awards	Best Actress	Viola Davis	Nominated	
2015	Critics' Choice Television Awards	Best Actress in a Drama Series	Viola Davis	Nominated	
2015	Critics' Choice Television Awards	Best Guest Performer in a Drama Series	Cicely Tyson	Nominated	
2015	GALECA Award	TV Drama of the Year	How to Get Away with Murder	Nominated	
2015	GALECA Award	TV Performance of the Year – Actress	Viola Davis	Nominated	
2015	GLAAD Media Awards	Outstanding Drama Series	How to Get Away with Murder	Won	
2015	Golden Globe Awards	Best Actress in a Television Series – Drama	Viola Davis	Nominated	
2015	NAACP Image Awards	Outstanding Drama Series	How to Get Away with Murder	Won	
2015	NAACP Image Awards	Outstanding Actress in a Drama Series	Viola Davis	Won	
2015	NAACP Image Awards	Outstanding Supporting Actor in a Drama Series	Alfred Enoch	Nominated	
2015	NAACP Image Awards	Outstanding Supporting Actress in a Drama Series	Aja Naomi King	Nominated	
2015	NAACP Image Awards	Outstanding Writing in a Dramatic Series	Erika Green Swafford (Episode: "Let's Get to Scooping")	Won	
2015	OFTA Television Award	Best Actress in a Drama Series	Viola Davis	Nominated	
2015	People's Choice Awards	Favorite Actress In A New TV Series	Viola Davis	Won	
2015	People's Choice Awards	Favorite New TV Drama	How to Get Away with Murder	Nominated	
2015	Primetime Emmy Awards	Outstanding Lead Actress in a Drama Series	Viola Davis	Won	
2015	Primetime Emmy Awards	Outstanding Guest Actress in a Drama Series	Cicely Tyson	Nominated	
2015	Screen Actors Guild Awards	Outstanding Performance by a Female Actor in a Drama Series	Viola Davis	Won	
2015	TCA Awards	Individual Achievement in Drama	Viola Davis	Nominated	
2016	Artios Awards	Casting, Television Pilot: Drama	Linda Lowy, Diane Heery, Jason Loftus, Jamie Castro	Nominated	
2016	Critics' Choice Television Awards	Best Actress in a Drama Series	Viola Davis	Nominated	
2016	BET Awards	Best Actress	Viola Davis	Nominated	
2016	GLAAD Media Awards	Outstanding Drama Series	How to Get Away with Murder	Nominated	
2016	Gold Derby Awards	Best Drama Actress	Viola Davis	Nominated	
2016	Gold Derby Awards	Best Drama Guest Actress	Famke Janssen	Nominated	
2016	Golden Globe Awards	Best Actress in a Television Series – Drama	Viola Davis	Nominated	
2016	NAACP Image Awards	Entertainer of the Year	Viola Davis	Nominated	
2016	NAACP Image Awards	Outstanding Drama Series	How to Get Away with Murder	Nominated	
2016	NAACP Image Awards	Outstanding Actress in a Drama Series	Viola Davis	Nominated	
2016	NAACP Image Awards	Outstanding Supporting Actor in a Drama Series	Alfred Enoch	Nominated	
2016	NAACP Image Awards	Outstanding Supporting Actress in a Drama Series	Cicely Tyson	Nominated	
2016	NAACP Image Awards	Outstanding Writer for a Drama Series	Erika Green Swafford, Doug Stockstill (Episode: "Mama's Here Now")	Nominated	
2016	People's Choice Awards	Favorite Dramatic TV Actress	Viola Davis	Nominated	
2016	People's Choice Awards	Favorite Network TV Drama	How to Get Away with Murder	Nominated	
2016	Primetime Emmy Awards	Outstanding Lead Actress in a Drama Series	Viola Davis	Nominated	
2016	Screen Actors Guild Awards	Outstanding Performance by a Female Actor in a Drama Series	Viola Davis	Won	
2017	Black Reel Television Awards	Outstanding Actress, Drama Series	Viola Davis	Nominated	
2017	Black Reel Television Awards	Outstanding Guest Actress, Drama Series	Angela Robinson (Episode: "There Are Worse Things Than Murder")	Nominated	
2017	NAACP Image Awards	Outstanding Actress in a Drama Series	Viola Davis	Nominated	
2017	Primetime Emmy Awards	Outstanding Lead Actress in a Drama Series	Viola Davis	Nominated	
2017	Primetime Emmy Awards	Outstanding Guest Actress in a Drama Series	Cicely Tyson	Nominated	
2018	Black Reel Television Awards	Outstanding Guest Actress, Drama Series	Cicely Tyson	Nominated	
2018	NAACP Image Awards	Outstanding Actress in a Drama Series	Viola Davis	Nominated	
2018	Primetime Emmy Awards	Outstanding Guest Actress in a Drama Series	Cicely Tyson	Nominated	
2019	BET Awards	Best Actress	Viola Davis	Nominated	
2019	NAACP Image Awards	Outstanding Actress in a Drama Series	Viola Davis	Nominated	
2019	NAACP Image Awards	Outstanding Drama Series	How to Get Away with Murder	Nominated	
2019	NAACP Image Awards	Outstanding Guest Actor or Actress in a Television Series	Kerry Washington	Won	
2019	Primetime Emmy Awards	Outstanding Lead Actress in a Drama Series	Viola Davis	Nominated	
2019	Primetime Emmy Awards	Outstanding Guest Actor in a Drama Series	Glynn Turman	Nominated	
2019	Primetime Emmy Awards	Outstanding Guest Actress in a Drama Series	Cicely Tyson	Nominated	
2020	Black Reel Television Awards	Outstanding Actress, Drama Series	Viola Davis	Nominated	
2020	Black Reel Television Awards	Outstanding Guest Actress, Drama Series	Cicely Tyson	Won	
2020	NAACP Image Awards	Outstanding Actress in a Drama Series	Viola Davis	Nominated	
2020	Primetime Emmy Awards	Outstanding Guest Actress in a Drama Series	Cicely Tyson	Nominated	
2021	BET Awards	Best Actress	Viola Davis	Nominated	
2021	NAACP Image Awards	Outstanding Actress in a Drama Series	Viola Davis	Won	

== Broadcast ==
How to Get Away with Murder aired on Thursdays at 10:00 p.m., Eastern Time. ABC pushed Grey's Anatomy and Scandal to 8 p.m. and 9 p.m., creating an all-night block of Shonda Rhimes–produced dramas airing on Thursdays, a rarity in American television. It was announced on July 14, 2014, that the series would debut September 25, 2014. In Canada, the series airs with sim-subbing of advertising in same timeslot on CTV, though it airs three hours earlier before the original ABC timeslot in the Atlantic Time Zone on CTV Atlantic in the Maritime Provinces.

The UK premiere of the series aired on Universal Channel on October 17, 2014.

The series also began airing on TV2 in New Zealand, 13th Street in Denmark, and the Seven Network in Australia on February 10, 2015. In Australia, the series moved to 7flix from the second half of the second season onwards and like in the US, airs in a programming block dedicated to Shonda Rhimes-produced dramas including Grey's Anatomy and Scandal.

In Sri Lanka, Malaysia, Philippines, Singapore, Hong Kong, Thailand and Indonesia, the series aired on Sony Channel Asia within 12 hours of its original broadcast. In India, it airs on Star World Premiere.

== Home media ==
Seasons 1 and 2 have been released on DVD, and Netflix originally streamed all six seasons once available (each season was added a month after its finale under their agreement with ABC Studios). The last five episodes aired on ABC are carried on Hulu the day after their premiere. Additionally, seasons, episodes and the entire series are purchasable from most online video retailers. However, from mid- to late 2025, all six seasons were removed from Netflix globally over the course of a year, due to Netflix's license to the series expiring. Later, in 2025, they were available to stream on Hulu in the U.S. and on Disney+ internationally.

=== Season 1 ===
The first season DVD was first released in Region 1 on August 4, 2015.

The Complete First Season
Set Details
Special Features
- 15 Episodes
- English, French and Spanish subtitles
- First Year Law: Behind the Scenes
- Bye Felicia Music Video
- Deleted Scenes
- Bloopers
Release Dates
Region 1
Region 2
Region 4
August 4, 2015
November 16, 2015
November 11, 2015

=== Season 2 ===
The second season DVD was first released in Region 1 on June 21, 2016.

The Complete Second Season
Set Details
Special Features
- 15 Episodes
- English, French and Spanish subtitles
- Deleted Scenes – Unseen moments from Season 2
- Bloopers
Release Dates
Region 1
Region 2
Region 4
June 21, 2016
November 14, 2016
TBA
