= A Jazzman's Blues =

2022 American drama film by Tyler Perry

- Promotional release poster
- Directed by: Tyler Perry
- Written by: Tyler Perry
- Produced by: Tyler Perry
- Starring: Joshua Boone; Amirah Vann; Solea Pfeiffer; Austin Scott; Ryan Eggold
- Cinematography: Brett Pawlak
- Edited by: Maysie Hoy
- Music by: Aaron Zigman
- Production company: Tyler Perry Studios
- Distributed by: Netflix
- Release dates: September 11, 2022 (TIFF); September 23, 2022 (United States)
- Running time: 128 minutes
- Country: United States
- Language: English

A Jazzman's Blues is a 2022 American drama film written, produced and directed by Tyler Perry. The film stars Joshua Boone, Amirah Vann, Solea Pfeiffer, Austin Scott, Brent Antonello, and Ryan Eggold. A Jazzman's Blues premiered at the Toronto International Film Festival on September 11, 2022, and was released on September 23, 2022, by Netflix.

== Plot ==
In 1987, elderly Hattie Mae visits Johnathan Dupree, the Attorney General of Hopewell, Georgia, who is running for re-election on a platform rooted in racist ideologies. She urges him to investigate the 1947 lynching of her son, Horace John Boyd, known as Bayou. She gives him a bundle of letters and tells him that the answers he seeks lie within them. Initially dismissive, Johnathan notices the letters are addressed to Leanne J. Harper, prompting him to read further.

In flashbacks, Bayou is introduced as a sensitive and musically gifted young man from a family of musicians. His mother, Hattie Mae, is a blues singer, while his father, Buster, is a guitarist who favors Bayou's older brother, Willie Earl, a talented trumpeter. Bayou is often belittled by Buster for his inability to play the trumpet. During a public performance, Buster humiliates Bayou by forcing him to try and play, only for him to fail. Willie Earl, by contrast, impresses the crowd with a flawless solo.

Later, Bayou meets Leanne Jean Harper, a lonely, educated girl referred to by the townspeople as "Bucket" due to her abandonment by her mother. Leanne insists Bayou call her by her real name, which he mispronounces as “Lil Ann.” The two form a bond and begin meeting secretly at night. Leanne discovers that Bayou is illiterate and offers to teach him to read. Their relationship deepens, but Leanne's abusive grandfather strongly disapproves and threatens Bayou if he comes near her again.

Buster eventually abandons the family, taking Hattie's savings and heading to Chicago. Willie Earl blames Bayou for their father's departure and soon follows Buster north in hopes of launching his own music career. Leanne abruptly ceases her nightly visits, and Bayou later discovers her being assaulted by her grandfather. He proposes they run away together, but before they can, Leanne is sent to Boston by her mother, Ethel, who has returned to take her daughter away. Ethel intercepts Bayou's letters and instructs the mailman to return them.

Bayou is later drafted into the army, where he continues writing to Leanne. During his service, Hattie Mae and a family friend, Citsy, move to Hopewell County, Georgia. In 1947, Hattie opens a juke joint and also works as a laundress, while Citsy is employed as the maid of Sheriff Jackson. Bayou is injured during service and returns home to help his mother. One night, Willie Earl returns with his manager, Ira, both appearing to be under the influence of drugs. Ira, near collapse, is cared for by Hattie and Bayou. Impressed by Bayou's voice during a performance at the juke joint, Ira offers to take him to Chicago for an audition.

Meanwhile, Leanne has returned to Hopewell, now married to John, the brother of Sheriff Jackson. Under her mother's pressure, Leanne is passing as a white woman for the sake of social standing and financial security. She and Bayou reconnect and resume their relationship in secret. When Ethel discovers them together, she falsely accuses Bayou of whistling at Leanne. Citsy overhears and warns Bayou, allowing him to flee with Willie Earl and Ira to Chicago.

In Chicago, when the manager at the Capitol Royale refuses to audition Willie Earl, Ira persuades Bayou to perform instead. Bayou becomes a star at the club. However, back in Georgia, Sheriff Jackson cracks down on Hattie Mae's juke joint, threatening arrest to patrons. She loses business and struggles financially. Though Bayou sends her money, a corrupt mail clerk steals it before it reaches her. Willie Earl's drug abuse worsens, leading to his dismissal from the club. Envious and bitter, he blames Bayou for his failures and informs the sheriff of Bayou's return to Georgia.

Bayou returns to Georgia under the pretense of a one-night performance to help his mother's failing club. He secretly arranges to meet Leanne and escape with her and their son to Chicago. However, due to Willie Earl's betrayal, Sheriff Jackson and a mob catch Bayou. He is lynched as Leanne and his family mourn his death.

Back in 1987, after reading the letters, Johnathan realizes he is the son of Bayou and Leanne. He confronts his mother, now elderly, and gives her Bayou's letters. Moved to tears, Leanne is finally faced with the truth. Johnathan, now aware of his true heritage as a fair-skinned Black man, steps outside, left to reconcile with his family history and identity.

== Cast ==
- Joshua Boone as Bayou
- Amirah Vann as Hattie Mae
  - Daphne Maxwell Reid as elderly Hattie Mae
- Solea Pfeiffer as Leanne
  - Waltrudis Buck as elderly Leanne
- Austin Scott as Willie Earl
- Ryan Eggold as Ira
- Brent Antonello as John
- Brad Benedict as Sheriff Jackson
- Milauna Jemai Jackson as Citsy
- Lana Young as Ethel
- E. Roger Mitchell as Buster
- Kario Marcel as Johnathan
- Corey Champagne as LeRoy

== Production ==
Tyler Perry wrote the screenplay, his first, in 1995. Lionsgate acquired the rights to the film in November 2006, with plans to begin production the following summer. In April 2008, it was slated to be Perry's next film following The Family That Preys (2008) with a tentative release in 2009. During a press junket for Madea Goes to Jail (2009), Perry expressed he had wanted to cast Diana Ross for a role but she had yet to respond. Perry explained, "I want her in the film. I've been sending flowers. I've been sending people by her. I've been sending emails to people who know her. I've talked to the man who walks her dog. I've been trying to locate where she's at." Perry continually delayed production on the film in hopes she would "say yes ...I just wish she would do it." The role, in particular, was that of a jazz singer who runs a juke joint. By December 2013, Perry admitted he had "given up" on casting Ross in the film.

On March 23, 2021, it was announced that Perry would direct the film A Jazzman's Blues for Netflix, with Joshua Boone and Solea Pfeiffer on board to star. On May 7, 2021, Brent Antonello, Brad Benedict, Ryan Eggold, Milauna Jemai Jackson, Kario Marcel, Austin Scott, Amirah Vann and Lana Young joined the cast of the film.

Principal photography began on May 5, 2021, and concluded on June 2. Filming took place in Savannah, Georgia, and at Tyler Perry Studios in Atlanta. The film's score was composed by Aaron Zigman, who scored several of Perry's previous films.

== Release ==
The film premiered at the Toronto International Film Festival on September 11, 2022, and was released on Netflix on September 23, 2022.

== Reception ==
On the review aggregator website Rotten Tomatoes, 67% of 36 critics' reviews are positive, with an average rating of 5.7/10. On Metacritic, the film has a weighted average score of 62 out of 100 based on 13 critics, indicating "generally favorable" reviews. It is Perry's most acclaimed film to date, a record previously held by 2009's I Can Do Bad All By Myself.

=== Accolades ===
Accolades received by Black Panther: Wakanda Forever
Award	Date of ceremony	Category	Recipient(s)	Result	Ref.
Black Reel Awards	February 6, 2023	Outstanding Soundtrack	Black Panther: Wakanda Forever (Soundtrack)	Nominated	
Black Reel Awards	February 6, 2023	Outstanding Original Song	Ruth B. for "Paper Airplanes"	Nominated	
NAACP Image Awards	February 25, 2023	Outstanding Motion Picture	A Jazzman's Blues	Nominated	
NAACP Image Awards	February 25, 2023	Outstanding Actor in a Motion Picture	Joshua Boone	Nominated	
NAACP Image Awards	February 25, 2023	Outstanding Breakthrough Performance in a Motion Picture	Joshua Boone	Nominated	
NAACP Image Awards	February 25, 2023	Outstanding Ensemble Cast in a Motion Picture	The cast of A Jazzman's Blues	Nominated	
