= Zora Howard =

American actress and writer

Personal details
- Born: New York City, New York, U.S.
- Education: Yale University (BA); University of California, San Diego (MFA)

Zora Howard is an American actress and writer. Her debut play, STEW, premiered off-Broadway in February 2020 and was a finalist for the Pulitzer Prize for Drama. She also co-wrote and starred in the 2019 drama Premature.

== Early life and education ==
Howard was born to veterinarian Julie Butler and Claude Howard and raised in Harlem. She began writing poetry at a young age, and performed with the spoken word group The Strivers Row. At age 13 she was the youngest poet ever to win the Urban Word NYC Grand Slam finals. Howard attended the world renowned Fiorello H. LaGuardia High School of Music & Art and Performing Arts, the FAME school. She received her Bachelors of Arts from Yale University in 2014. She received a Masters of Fine Arts from the graduate acting program at the University of California, San Diego.

== Career ==
The 2019 film Premature is Howard's first starring role and debut feature film screenplay, co-written with director Rashaad Ernesto Green. Howard previously met Green in New York's theater scene when she was 11. When she was 14, he cast her in his student film while a student at NYU Tisch, also called Premature. She also worked with Green on his first feature film, Gun Hill Road.

In 2017, Green contacted Howard to develop a feature film script for Premature. The film follows Howard as Ayanna, a 17-year-old New Yorker who strikes up a summer romance with an artist in his twenties (Joshua Boone). It premiered at Sundance 2019. The film received positive critical reception. Writing for Elle, Candace Frederick called it "the kind of confident, remarkably vulnerable drama to which even veteran storytellers aspire." Michael Cuby of Nylon described it as, "a coming-of-age love story that's as much about finding your first love as it is about using that first love to find yourself."

Howard's first play, STEW, ran in February 2020 at Walkerspace in New York. It centers a family of three generations of women who must grapple with their personal choices. In a mainly positive review for Vulture, Helen Shaw stated, "Howard moves from broad strokes to ontological bewilderment almost before you know it...Howard makes us hear hundreds of years of pain, knocking to be let in."

== Accolades ==
- 2009 Youth Poet Laureate (New York City), Inaugural Winner
- 2020-2021 Van Lier New Voices Fellow, The Lark
- 2021 Pulitzer Prize for Drama, Finalist (for STEW)
