= Gun Hill Road (film) =

- Film poster
- Directed by: Rashaad Ernesto Green
- Written by: Rashaad Ernesto Green
- Produced by: Ron Simons; Michelle-Anne M. Small
- Starring: Esai Morales; Judy Reyes; Isiah Whitlock, Jr.
- Cinematography: Daniel Patterson
- Edited by: Sara Corrigan
- Music by: Enrique Feldman; Stefan Swanson
- Distributed by: Motion Film Group
- Release date: 2011
- Country: United States
- Language: English

Gun Hill Road is a 2011 drama film directed by Rashaad Ernesto Green and starring Esai Morales. The title of the film derives from the Bronx road of the same name. The film is notable for starring a transgender character who is played by a transgender actor, Harmony Santana, who was the first openly transgender actress to be nominated for an Independent Spirit Award.

== Premise ==
Ex-con Enrique (Esai Morales) returns home after a stint in prison. His wife Angela has had an affair while he was away, and his daughter Vanessa, who is a young trans woman in the process of transitioning and coming out, is navigating her life through a bigoted environment, leaving Enrique with decisions to make regarding his family's future.

== Cast ==
- Esai Morales as Enrique
- Judy Reyes as Angela
- Harmony Santana as Vanessa
- Isiah Whitlock, Jr. as Thompson
- Míriam Colón as Gloria
- Felix Solis as Pete
- Franky G as Tico
- Vincent Laresca as Hector
- Robert Prescott as Mr. Donovan
- Robin de Jesús as Robin
- Shirley Rumierk as Jeanette

== Reception ==
=== Critical reception ===
The film has received mixed reviews. On review aggregator website Rotten Tomatoes, the film holds an approval rating of 65% based on 31 reviews, and an average rating of 6.06/10. The critical consensus reads: "Equal parts absorbing and educational, Gun Hill Road wears its heart on its sleeve through tender performances that make up for its narrative familiarity". On Metacritic, the film has a weighted average score of 55 out of 100, based on 14 critics, indicating "mixed or average" reviews.

Kirk Honeycutt of The Hollywood Reporter said in his review: "In his feature debut, Gun Hill Road, writer-director Rashaad Ernesto Green displays compassion for his characters and an ability to create strong scenes to underscore his thematic concerns. But the story itself is too shopworn especially at Sundance where countless films have presented dysfunctional families where parents and offspring are at odds". Dennis Harvey of Variety similarly said; "script and direction tend to telegraph all events, draining the competently packaged pic of tension, nuance and surprise".

The subject matter of the movie was noted "for the casualness with which it puts a Hispanic transsexual in a black male's bed" because this kind of relationship is rarely seen in movies.

=== Awards and nominations ===
Director Rashaad Ernesto Green was nominated for the Grand Jury Prize at the Sundance Film Festival.

== Awards/Nominations ==
- Independent Spirit Awards
  - 2012, Best Supporting Actress: Harmony Santana (Nominee)

== See also ==
- List of hood films
