= Peter Nowalk =

American television writer and producer

- Born: September 12, 1978 (age 48); Point Pleasant, New Jersey, U.S.
- Education: Brown University (BA)
- Occupation: Writer
- Writing career
- Notable work: How to Get Away with Murder

Peter Nowalk (born September 12, 1978) is an American television writer and producer.

He is known as the creator of the legal thriller How to Get Away with Murder.

== Early life ==
Nowalk was raised in Point Pleasant, New Jersey, and graduated from Point Pleasant Borough High School in 1996. Speaking of his childhood, he has stated "I think my family's really nice, where I grew up was really pretty and nice, and I wanted to go to the dark side because my life wasn't dark. The TV shows I like are all twisted and dark."

Nowalk attended Brown University in Providence, Rhode Island, where he graduated in 2000 with a Bachelor of Arts degree in American civilization. He is openly gay.

== Career ==
Nowalk co-wrote The Hollywood Assistants Handbook: 86 Rules for Aspiring Power Players, published by Workman Publishing Company in 2008. In the same year, Nowalk was hired as a writer for the Shonda Rhimes medical drama series Private Practice. After a few months, Nowalk began writing for Rhimes' Grey's Anatomy as recurring writer and later executive story editor and supervising producer. He is also co-executive producer of Scandal. Nowalk wrote "Everything's Coming Up Mellie", the seventh episode of the third season of Scandal in 2013.

=== How to Get Away with Murder ===
Nowalk was the creator and executive producer of the ABC drama series, How to Get Away with Murder produced by Shondaland. The series pilot on September 25, 2014, set a record for DVR playback viewers with 6 million, surpassing the January 27, 2014, record of 5.6 million set by the pilot of The Blacklist.

== Credits ==
- Grey's Anatomy (2008–2013, writer – 11 episodes, story editor – 40 episodes, supervising producer/producer - 69 episodes)
- Scandal (2013–2018, co-executive producer, writer – episode "Everything's Coming Up Mellie")
- How to Get Away with Murder (2014–2020, executive producer, creator, showrunner)
