= Imagine This! TV =

Imagine This! TV is a progressive documentary-like reality series. Each episode follows the lives of the cast through a weeklong service project developed to help a community somewhere in the world that is in need. The pilot episode, "Sacred Valley of Peru", was released in 2009 throughout the US in public screenings. Since then, the show has created an interactive website where members can direct show episodes through project proposals that create sustainable solutions to real world issues. They also have released two teaser trailers online both on YouTube and the show website. In July 2009, Entertainment Weekly placed the project on their "Must-See List". Actor Eion Bailey created the show.
