= Mia Saunders =

Mia Saunders may refer to:

- Mia Saunders (comics), in DC Comics
- Mia Saunders, in the US TV soap opera All My Children, played by Amelia Heinle
