= Maximum Impact =

Film by Andrzej Bartkowiak

- Russian theatrical release poster
- Russian: Максимальный удар
- Directed by: Andrzej Bartkowiak
- Screenplay by: Ross LaManna
- Produced by: Alexander Nevsky; Alexander Izotov; Alina Dumova
- Starring: Alexander Nevsky; Kelly Hu; Mark Dacascos; Danny Trejo; Tom Arnold; Eric Roberts
- Cinematography: Vern Nobles
- Edited by: Thomas Calderon
- Music by: Sean Murray
- Production companies: Hollywood Storm; Czar Pictures
- Distributed by: CineTel Films (US)
- Release dates: November 30, 2017 (Russia); September 28, 2018 (United States)
- Running time: 110 minutes
- Countries: Russia; United States
- Languages: English; Russian

Maximum Impact (Russian: Максимальный удар, romanized: Maksimal'ny udar) is a 2017 action comedy film directed by Andrzej Bartkowiak, written by Ross LaManna, and starring Alexander Nevsky, Kelly Hu, Yevgeny Stychkin, Mark Dacascos, Danny Trejo, Tom Arnold and Eric Roberts. The film was released theatrically in Russia on November 30, 2017, and direct-to-video in the United States on October 2, 2018.

== Plot ==
A failed terrorist assassination attempt on the U.S. Secretary of State while he is visiting Moscow for international negotiations results in the abduction of his granddaughter. While the world sits on the brink of World War III special agents from the CIA and FSB must unite to save the girl and prevent war.

== Cast ==
- Alexander Nevsky as FSB Agent Maxim Kadurin
- Kelly Hu as CIA Agent Kate Desmond
- Mark Dacascos as Tony Lin
- Tom Arnold as Barnes
- Yevgeny Stychkin as FSB Agent Andrei Durov
- Maksim Vitorgan as FSB Agent Dobrynin
- Danny Trejo as Don Sanchez
- William Baldwin as The Man In Shadows
- Eric Roberts as Secretary of State Robert Jacobs
- Polina Butorina as Brittany Jacobs
- Matthias Hues as Ian
- Alphonso McAuley as Nathan Robinson
- Bai Ling as Melany Scanlon
- Keith Powers as Special Agent Vance
- Odin Lund Biron as P.B. Floyd
- Hafedh Dakhlaoui as Goon 1
- Pavel Maykov as the guard at the cigar club
- Victoria Bonya as the girl by the pool at the cigar club
