= Sexual life =

Sexual life may refer to:

- Human sexual activity
- Sexual Life, a 2005 comedy-drama film
