= Extortion (disambiguation) =

Extortion is the act of obtaining benefit through coercion.

Extortion may also refer to:

- Extortion (1938 film), a mystery film directed by Lambert Hillyer
- Extortion (2017 film), an action film directed by Phil Volken
