= Richard Tyson =

American actor

- Born: Richard Martin Tyson; 1955 or 1956 (age 70–71); Mobile, Alabama, U.S.
- Education: United States Naval Academy; University of Alabama, Tuscaloosa (BFA); Cornell University (MFA)
- Occupation: Actor
- Years active: 1986–present
- Spouse: Tracy Kristofferson (m. July 1996; div. 2017)
- Children: 1

Richard Martin Tyson (born 1955 or 1956) is an American actor. He is best known as Kaz in Hardball (1989–1990) as well as his film roles in Three O'Clock High (1987), Two Moon Junction (1988), Kindergarten Cop (1990), Bound to Vengeance (2015), and Playing with Dolls (2015).

== Biography ==
Tyson was born in Mobile, Alabama. His brother John was the district attorney of Mobile County, and was later the Democratic Party nominee for attorney general of Alabama in 2006.

Tyson starred in Three O'Clock High, Kindergarten Cop and three films directed by the Farrelly brothers. He starred in the television series Hardball. His roles in the 2000s included The Fear Chamber, Richard III, Flight of the Living Dead, No Bad Days and the western Shoot First and Pray You Live. He starred in the horror film Big Bad Wolf in which he is accused by his stepson of being a cruel and vicious werewolf.

Tyson played a former football star who owned the eponymous town in Jake's Corner. He guest-starred in CSI: NY, Boomtown and Martial Law. His other film appearances include The Visitation, Liar's Poker and Black Hawk Down. Tyson played Genghis Khan in an unfinished film of the same name, which was originally scheduled for release in 1992.

== Filmography ==
=== Film ===
Year	Title	Role	Notes
1987	Three O'Clock High	Buddy Revell	film debut
1988	Two Moon Junction	Perry Tyson	
1990	Kindergarten Cop	Cullen Crisp Sr.	
1992	Lakota Moon	Smoke	television movie
1992	The Babe	Guy Bush	
1992	Genghis Khan	Genghis Khan	unfinished
1993	Dark Tide	Dak	
1995	Pharaoh's Army	Rodie	
1996	Time Under Fire	Koda	
1996	Kingpin	strip club bouncer	
1996	The Glass Cage	Paul Yaeger	
1998	Implicated	Carl	
1998	There's Something About Mary	Detective Krevoy	
1998	The Pandora Project	Captain William Stenwick	
1999	Desert Thunder	Ralph Streets	
1999	Liar's Poker	Jack	
2000	Operation Sandman	Gunnery Sergeant Riggins	television movie
2000	Battlefield Earth	Robert the Fox	
2000	Me, Myself & Irene	Gun Shop Owner	
2001	Dying on the Edge		
2001	Firetrap	Paul Brody	
2001	Monsoon		
2001	Black Hawk Down	Busch	
2002	Psychic Murders	David	
2002	Cottonmouth	Thomas Carruth	
2004	Crusader		
2004	Last Flight Out	Dan	
2004	The Trail to Hope Rose	Gerald Ruthledge	
2004	Moscow Heat	Nikolay Klimov	
2005	Yesterday's Dreams	Jake	
2005	Lonesome Matador		
2006	Naked Run	Lancer Higgins	
2006	The Visitation	Sheriff Brett Henchle	
2006	When I Find the Ocean	Dean	
2006	Big Bad Wolf	Mitchell Toblat	
2007	Flight of the Living Dead: Outbreak on a Plane	Paul Judd	
2007	The Dukes	Ralph	
2007	Stripper Academy	Mr. VIP	
2007	Becoming		
2008	Richard III	Duke of Clarence	
2008	Jake's Corner	Johhny Dunn	
2008	3 Days Gone	Agent Markowitz	
2008	No Bad Days	Robert	
2008	Shoot First and Pray You Live (Because Luck Has Nothing to Do with It)	Black Gandil Morgan	
2009	The Moonlighters	Tubbs	
2009	The Fear Chamber	Teddy	
2009	Bigfoot	David Caldwell	
2009	The Black Waters of Echo's Pond	Nicholas	
2009	Magic Man	Detective Rogers	
2009	Dark Room Theater	Officer Carlson	
2009	Inner City Snow	Captain Hankie	
2010	Once Fallen	Keys	
2010	Creative Differences		
2010	Double Tap	Captain Spears	
2010	Sin-Jin Smyth		unreleased
2011	You!	Charles Martin	
2011	The Story of Bonnie and Clyde		
2011	Not Another Not Another Movie		
2012	Hayride	Morgan	
2014	Ghost of Goodnight Lane	Ron	
2015	Bound to Vengeance	Phil	
2015	Another Turn in the Sun	Sergeant Wade	
2015	Playing with Dolls	The Watcher / Scopophilio	
2015	Hayride 2	Morgan	
2016	Boonville Redemption	Maddox	
2016	The Perfect Weapon	Controller	
2016	Playing with Dolls: Bloodlust	The Watcher / Scopophilio	
2018	Death Kiss	Tyrell	
2019	Night Walk	John	
2019	Blood Immortal	Mr. Duncan	
2019	Eternal Code	Oliver	
2019	Die for a Dollar	Buddy	
2019	The League of Legend Keepers: Shadows	Travis	Producer
2019	Miracle in the Valley	Maddox	
2020	Cry Havoc	The Watcher, Scopophilio	Executive producer
2020	Acts of Revenge	Antonio Rugada	
2020	Charlie's Christmas Wish	Uncle Ron	Producer
2021	Mummy Dearest	Mr. Norwood	
2021	Niemand	Dr. Smith	
2021	Under the Palm Tree	Ted	
2021	Vampire Slayer	Papa	
2022	Sally Floss: Digital Detective	Edward	
2022	Legend of Hawes	Mister Tyson	
2022	Vagary: A Viking Tale	Rolf	
2023	You're All Gonna Die	The Monster	
2024	Blooming Sisters	Jackson	
2024	Realm of Shadows	Hugo	
2025	Finding Nicole	Judge Carter	
2025	Final Recovery	Dr. Sam Potter	
2025	Bloodstorm	TBA	

=== Television ===
Year	Title	Role	Notes
1986	Moonlighting	Daniel	1 episode
1988	Disneyland	Lute Newhouser	
1989	China Beach	Cpl. Whitlow	1 episode
1989–1990	Hardball	Joe "Kaz" Kaczierowski	18 episodes
1992	Red Shoe Diaries	Bud	1 episode
1994	Winnetka Road	Dwayne Serlin	5 episodes
1994	Dead at 21	Cali	1 episode
1994	Christy	Billy Long	1 episode
1997	The Sentinel	Frank Rafferty	1 episode
1998	Buddy Faro		1 episode
2000	Martial Law		
2003	Black Sash	Arnold Brady	
2003	Boomtown	Frank Needham	1 episode
2006	CSI: NY	Frank Russo	1 episode
2009	The Closer	Ted	1 episode

== Personal life ==
Tyson attended Davidson High School in Mobile, Alabama.

He married Tracy Kristofferson (daughter of Kris). The couple divorced in 2017, and have one child together.

Tyson was arrested on suspicion of public intoxication and harassment on June 19, 2019, and released on bail within a few hours. He was arrested again less than two weeks later soon after his warrant was issued on June 25, for alleged burglary. He was then expected to be arraigned on all charges on July 17, 2019.
