= Stormwatch =

Stormwatch may refer to:

- Stormwatch (album), a 1979 album by Jethro Tull
- Stormwatch (comics), a comic book superhero team from Wildstorm Productions and DC Comics
- Storm Watch, a 2002 American science fiction film

== See also ==
- Storm warning, a maritime weather alert
