= Alexander Nevsky (actor) =

Russian actor and writer (born 1971)

- Александр Невский
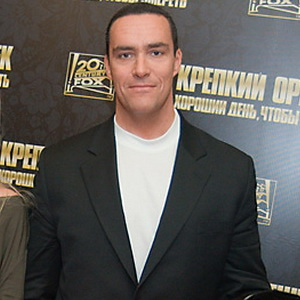
- Nevsky in 2013
- Born: Alexander Alexandrovich Kuritsyn; 17 July 1971 (age 55); Moscow, Russian SFSR, Soviet Union
- Citizenship: Russia; United States
- Occupations: bodybuilder, actor, producer, writer
- Years active: 1985–present

Alexander Alexandrovich Nevsky (Note: Russian: Александр Александрович Невский) (né Kuritsyn; (Note: Russian: Александр Александрович Курицын) 17 July 1971) is a Russian American amateur bodybuilder, actor, writer, and producer. He is known for playing the role of Vlad Stepanov in Moscow Heat. At the age of 25, he changed his surname from Kuritsyn to Nevsky.

From 2003 to 2022, he was a member of the Hollywood Foreign Press Association and a voter for the Golden Globes.

== Early years ==
Alexander is the youngest child in the family. His father, Alexander Nikolaevich Kuritsyn, taught economics at MGIMO, and his mother, Evgenia Yanovna Kuritsyna, was an instrument-making engineer.

== Personal life ==
Nevsky has been dating Russian-American actress, cosplayer, martial artist and stuntwoman Tatiana Neva since 2022. Nevsky became an American citizen in 2019.

== Filmography ==
TBA	Savage Attack	Robert Garin
2025	The Wide West	Max
2024	Taken From Rio Bravo	Ivan Turchin
2022	Gunfight at Rio Bravo	Ivan Turchin
2021	Red Prophecies	Peter Morgan
2017	Maximum Impact	Maxim Kadulin
2016	Showdown in Manila	Nick Peyton
2014	Black Rose	Vlad Kazatov
2010	Magic Man	Detective Orloff
2010	Somewhere	Russian Journalist
2007	Treasure Raiders	Wolf
2005	Time of Change	Alexander
2004	Moscow Heat	Vlad Stepanov
2003	Red Serpent	Peter aka Terminator
2002	Undisputed	Prisoner
2000	Still Waters	Sergey
