= Life of the Party (2005 film) =

- Directed by: Barra Grant
- Screenplay by: Barra Grant
- Produced by: Brian Reilly
- Starring: Eion Bailey; Ellen Pompeo
- Cinematography: Lawrence Sher
- Edited by: Pamela Martin
- Music by: Mark Adler
- Distributed by: ThinkFilm; Lifetime Network
- Release date: April 10, 2007
- Running time: 97 minutes
- Country: United States
- Language: English

Life of the Party is a 2005 film with Eion Bailey and Ellen Pompeo. It was written and directed by Barra Grant.

== Synopsis ==
Michael Elgin, former high school track star, now in his thirties, is floundering. He keeps life's realities at bay by having too many cocktails a few nights too often. One night, he crashes into a tree, emerges unscathed but catalyzes those who care into organizing an intervention. Michael comes home to find the group waiting: his friends, co-workers, parents, his wife, his new girlfriend. The group is nervous. The psychiatrist who was supposed to guide them is stuck in town with a suicidal patient. True to form, Michael takes over, and turns the event into yet another party. All the invitees start drinking themselves and the event spirals out of control. Secrets are revealed, emotions erupt, relationships disintegrate and Michael's life comes crashing down around him. In the aftermath, as he tries to pick up the pieces, Michael finally hits bottom, and is forced to face his demons.

== Cast ==
- Eion Bailey as Michael Elgin
- Ellen Pompeo as Phoebe Elgin
- Clifton Collins, Jr. as Kipp
- John Ales as Artie
- Gabriel Olds as Stuart
- Kristin Bauer van Straten as Caroline
- Pamela Reed as Evelyn
- David Clennon as Jack
- John Ross Bowie as Bert
- Rosalind Chao as Mei Lin
- Larry Miller as Dr. Trent

== Reception ==
=== Accolades ===
Association	Category	Recipient	Result	Ref
Daytime Emmy Awards	Outstanding Performer in a Children/Youth/Family Special	Eion Bailey	Won	
LA Femme International Film Festival	Best Writer	Barra Grant	Won	
