= Black Rose (2014 film) =

- Film poster
- Russian: Чёрная роза
- Directed by: Alexander Nevsky
- Screenplay by: Brent Huff, George Saunders
- Produced by: Sheldon Lettich, Alexander Nevsky, Alexander Izotov
- Starring: Alexander Nevsky, Kristanna Loken, Adrian Paul, Robert Davi
- Cinematography: Rudy Harbon
- Edited by: Stephen Adrianson
- Music by: Sean Murray
- Production companies: Hollywood Storm, Czar Pictures
- Distributed by: Eagle Films, Film & TV House
- Release date: 25 January 2014 (Russia)
- Running time: 83 minutes
- Countries: United States, Russia
- Languages: English, Russian
- Budget: $7,000,000
- Box office: $887,615 (Russia)

Black Rose (Russian: Чёрная роза, romanized: Chyornaya roza) is a 2014 American and Russian co-produced action film directed by, and starring, Alexander Nevsky. The film also stars Kristanna Loken, Adrian Paul, and Robert Davi. The film was released on 25 January 2014 in Russia. It was made on a budget of $7,000,000.

== Premise ==
In Los Angeles, several Russian girls have been murdered. Police cannot find the killer. For this reason, the Russian police officer Vladimir Kazatov comes to LA. Together with his American partner Emily Smith, he proceeds to investigate these crimes.

== Cast ==
- Alexander Nevsky as Vladimir Kazatov
- Kristanna Loken as Emily Smith
- Adrian Paul as Matt Robinson
- Robert Davi as Captain Frank Dalano
- Matthias Hues as Black Mask Killer
- Hafedh Dakhlaoui as Max
- Emmanuil Vitorgan as Colonel Gromov
- Robert Madrid as Antonio Banuelos
- Oksana Sidorenko as Sandra
- Dmitriy Bikbaev as Gary
- Olga Rodionova as Natalya

== Production ==
The film was shot in Moscow (Russia) and in Los Angeles (United States).
