= Moscow Heat =

- Directed by: Jeff Celentano
- Written by: Alexander Nevsky; Robert Madrid
- Starring: Michael York; Alexander Nevsky; Richard Tyson; Robert Madrid; Andrew Divoff; Joanna Pacula; Adrian Paul
- Release dates: November 24, 2004 (Russia); November 8, 2005 (USA)
- Running time: 100 minutes
- Country: Russia
- Languages: English; Russian

Moscow Heat (Russian: Московская жара) is a 2004 Russian action film directed by Jeff Celentano.

== Cast ==
- Michael York as Roger Chambers
- Alexander Nevsky as Vlad Stepanov
- Richard Tyson as Nikolay Klimov
- Robert Madrid as Rudi Souza
- Andrew Divoff as Edward Weston
- Joanna Pacula as Sasha
- Adrian Paul as Andrew Chambers
- Alexander Izotov as Podpolkovnik
- Mariya Golubkina as Masha
- Aleksandr Belyavskiy as Dedushka Vlada
- Sergey Gorobchenko as Oleg
- Gennadi Vengerov as Shishov
- Jeff Celentano as Denis
