= Red Serpent =

- DVD poster
- Directed by: Gino Tanasescu
- Written by: Drew Fleming; Cyndy Kuipers; George Lascu
- Produced by: Oleg Kapanets
- Starring: Michael Pare; Roy Scheider; Oleg Taktarov
- Cinematography: Andrey Zhegalov; Andrey Belkanov
- Edited by: Matt Harry
- Music by: Kenneth Burgomaster; John Valentino; Alexey Belov
- Production companies: Kremlin Films; Rex Media
- Release date: September 3, 2003
- Running time: 92 min.
- Countries: Russia; Germany
- Languages: Russian; English
- Budget: $5 000 000

Red Serpent is a 2003 Russian-German action adventure film directed by Gino Tanasescu.

== Plot ==
Steve Nichols comes to Moscow to conclude a contract. Unbeknownst to Steve, he has to become a front for transporting drugs supplied by a local gangster nicknamed Red Serpent. And his personal consent is just a technical matter.

The only hope for the trapped businessman is the former KGB officer Sergei Popov, who has old scores with the Serpent.

== Cast ==
- Michael Pare as Steve Nichols
- Roy Scheider as Hassan (Red Serpent)
- Oleg Taktarov as Sergey Popov
- Alexander Nevsky as Peter
- John Mastando as Dylan Navarre
- Irina Apeksimova as Sasha
- Yuriy Dumchev as Shifty
- Gary Kasper as Ivan Kutuza
- Andris Lielais as Medvedev
- Vladimir Zaitsev as Gurov
- Egor Pazenko as Boris

== Critical response ==
Russian film critic Valery Kichin considered the film unspectacular and boring, giving it a rating of 1 out of 10.

BadComedian called the Tanasescu film "stupidity, idiocy and nonsense".

Reviewer Andrey Volkov (Postcriticism.ru) named only the performance of some actors as a plus, but in general he described the film as far from professional cinema.
