= Phantom Below =

- Screenplay by: Mark Sanderson
- Story by: Stephen P. Jarchow
- Directed by: Brian Trenchard-Smith
- Starring: Adrian Paul; Catherine Dent; Mike Doyle; Matt Battaglia; Mark Deklin
- Theme music composer: David Reynolds
- Country of origin: United States
- Original language: English

Production
- Producer: Brian Trenchard-Smith
- Cinematography: Paul Atkins; Mark Gerasimenko
- Editor: Stephen Mirrione
- Running time: 95 minutes
- Budget: $1.6 million

Original release
- Release: April 1, 2005

Phantom Below (also known as USS Poseidon: Phantom Below and Tides of War) is the first film released by Hawaii-based studio Pacific Films. Its world premiere was at the Hawaii International Film Festival on March 31, 2005. The film is notable in that it has three different editions: one for general audiences, another with eight additional minutes for Japanese audiences, and one with a homosexual theme (Tides of War) as an original film production for LGBT-interest television channel here!.

It was filmed entirely on the Hawaiian island of Oahu and employed hundreds of local actors and crew members. It was produced and directed by Brian Trenchard-Smith and stars Adrian Paul as Commander Frank Habley and Mike Doyle as his lover, Lt. Commander Tom Palatonio.

== Plot summary ==
The film takes place primarily in the waters off the coast of North Korea with some scenes set in Hawaii. As it opens, an American submarine under the command of Commander Habley is attacked by an enemy submarine that has no sonar signature. Although it survives the fight, the American submarine is badly damaged and Tom, Habley's executive officer is killed.

Upon return to base in Pearl Harbor, Commander Habley is subjected to a court martial. The Navy does not believe his story and it appears his career is over until he is recruited to command a covert mission to tap an underwater cable lying between North Korea and mainland China. This is a highly sensitive and dangerous task because tensions are rising between the United States and North Korea, and it appears the two nations are on the brink of war. Habley's mission is complicated by the presence of Lieutenant Claire Trifoli, Tom's sister, who blames him for her brother's death.

== Production ==
The movie was partly financed by a Japanese DVD and TV distributor looking for a submarine drama to cash in on the release publicity for an upcoming $12-million Japanese submarine drama. They partnered with the here! Network, a new video on demand channel catering to the gay and lesbian market which needed an original movie to launch the channel. It was decided to make two versions, a non-gay version for Japan and a gay one for other markets. Director Brian Trenchard-Smith:

For me, the gay version is better drama. The hero has a secret. We were at the height of the ‘don’t ask/don’t tell’ debate at that time. Formula is always enlivened by a serious social issue. It intrigued me as a heterosexual to add a genre cocktail to the B-movie shelf of Gay Cinema. Gay movies can be about more than just coming out. They can be as testosterone charged as FAST 5. Why shouldn’t the gay audience have their own action heroes?

The film was shot in Hawaii over 15 days without official army or navy co-operation because the plot had the sub commander in love with his executive officer. Brian Trenchard-Smith also made In Her Line of Fire, another action film aimed at gay audiences.

== See also ==
- Submarine film
