= Adrian Paul =

English actor (born 1959)

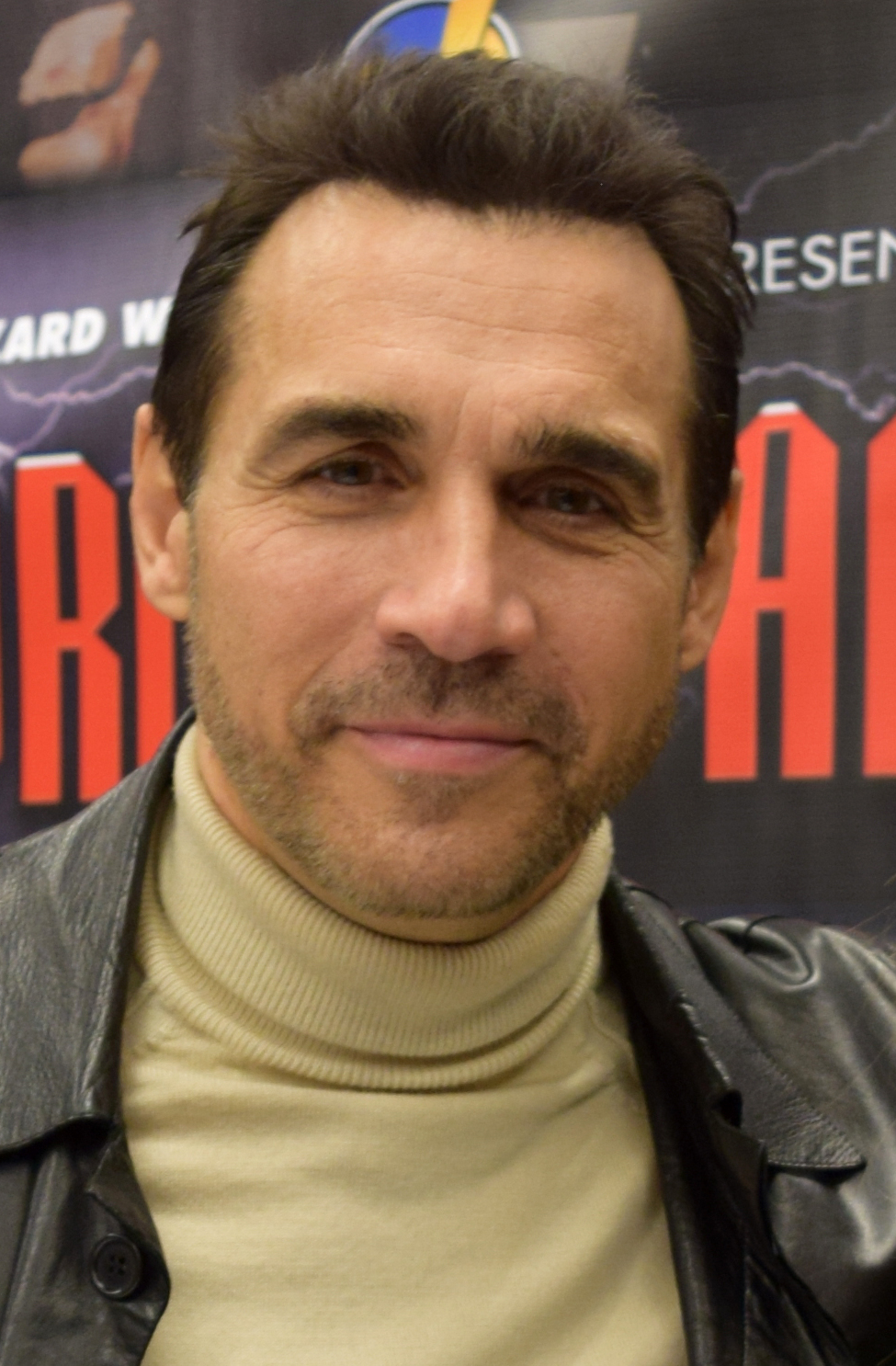
- Paul in 2015
- Born: 29 May 1959 (age 66); London, England
- Occupation: Actor
- Years active: 1981–present
- Height: 185 cm (6 ft 1 in)
- Spouses: Meilani Figalan (m. 1990; div. 1997) Alexandra Tonelli (m. 2009)
- Children: 3

Adrian Paul Hewett (born 29 May 1959) is an English actor, martial artist and director best known for the title role of Duncan MacLeod on the television series Highlander: The Series. In 1997, he founded the Peace Fund charitable organisation.

== Early life ==
Paul was born in London, the first of three brothers, to an Italian mother and a British father. He attended St Mary's Grammar School (as was) in Sidcup, Kent, where in his time in 6th Form, he established something of an empire based in the school library selling first so-called "stales" from the baker's in Sidcup High Street, progressing to a selection of biscuits. Paul first became a model, then a dancer and choreographer. As a teenager, he was a capable footballer and made several appearances for Cray Wanderers in the London Spartan League between 1976 and 1978. In 1985, Paul moved to the United States to pursue careers in dance and modeling.

Paul spent time in the theatre, appearing in numerous plays, and has stated that these, along with an early television appearance on Beauty and the Beast (1987), helped to shape his acting abilities.

== Career ==
Paul's first role was on the ABC television series The Colbys in 1986, as ballet dancer Nikolai "Kolya" Rostov. This was followed by guest appearances on various television shows, including the aforementioned Beauty and the Beast (1987), two episodes of Tarzán (1991), Murder, She Wrote (1992), Relic Hunter (1999), and as himself in WWE SmackDown (1999). He also appeared in a January 2003 episode of Charmed and in the Off-Broadway play Bouncers (1987), as well as in the television films Shooter (1988) and The Cover Girl Murders (1993), the latter of which starred Lee Majors.

Paul's first film appearance was in the 1988 film Last Rites, which starred Tom Berenger. He starred in the remake Masque of the Red Death, a re-telling of the Edgar Allan Poe tale. He also appeared in Sheena Easton's "Days Like This" music video as her love interest and Duran Duran's "My Own Way" music video as a dancer.

In 1989, he appeared in a regular role in the second season of the television series War of the Worlds as John Kincaid, three episodes of the 1991 Dark Shadows remake as Jeremiah Collins, and made a pilot for CBS Television for a series called The Owl (1991). In 2001, he starred in Tracker.

In 1992, Paul was cast in his most widely known role of Duncan MacLeod in the syndicated television series Highlander: The Series, which first aired in October 1992. He would portray the role on and off for the next 15 years, also starring in the big screen sequel Highlander: Endgame (2000), and the television film Highlander: The Source, released on the Sci-Fi Channel on 15 September 2007.

Other films in which he has starred or co-starred are Dance to Win (1989), Love Potion No. 9 (1992), Dead Men Can't Dance (1997), Susan's Plan (1998), Merlin: The Return (1999) as Lancelot, Convergence (1999), The Void (2001), The Breed (2001), Storm Watch (2002), Nemesis Game (2003) Throttle (2005), and Phantom Below (2005). In 2006, he co-starred in the horror film Séance and in Little Chicago. A year later, Paul appeared as Ananias Dare in the Sci-Fi Channel original film Wraiths of Roanoke (2007).

Also in 2007, Paul played the lead role in the TV movie Tides of War as Commander Frank Habley, a gay officer in charge of a submarine that infiltrates North Korean waters where he instinctively discovers a secret stealth North Korean submarine and destroys it. The fleeting moments of Commander Habley and fellow officer Tom Palatonia's (played by Mike Doyle) relationship come to an abrupt end due to a fire aboard the submarine where Tom is killed while fighting the blaze. Tides of War also costars Matthew St. Patrick of Six Feet Under fame as Lieutenant Commander Steven Barker.

In 2008, Paul began voice acting the character of Patrick O'Brien in the animated War of the Worlds television show. He starred as Sir Francis Drake in the Sci-Fi Channel original film The Immortal Voyage of Captain Drake (2009), the futuristic thriller Eyeborgs (2009), and the thriller-drama The Heavy (2010). In 2012, Paul did a character voice-over in the Malaysian animated science fiction film War of the Worlds: Goliath. Paul starred in the 2013 science fiction film AE: Apocalypse Earth, a post-apocalyptic action-adventure film.

In 2015, he made a guest appearance as Commandant Leitner in Strike Back. In March 2019, he joined the CW series Arrow in a recurring role, playing a villainous character named Dante.

== Personal life ==
Paul married actress Meilani Figalan in 1990. The couple divorced in 1997. Paul married long-time girlfriend Alexandra Tonelli in 2009. They have three children, a daughter born in 2010, and two sons born in 2012 and 2020.

Since the late 1980s, he has studied a range of martial arts, including Taekwondo, Choy Li Fut, and Hung Gar Kung Fu, and has been featured on the covers of Impact (three times), Inside Kung Fu, Karate International (four times) and Martial Arts Insider.

=== Filmblips ===
Paul is also involved in the development and production side of the entertainment industry. In 2008, he joined with Zoltan Furedi and founded Filmblips, an independent film and television media production company.

== Filmography ==
=== Film ===
| Year | Title | Role | Notes |
|---|---|---|---|
| 1988 | Last Rites | Tony | |
| 1989 | Dance to Win | Billy James | |
| 1989 | Masque of the Red Death | Prospero | |
| 1992 | Love Potion No. 9 | Enrico Pazzoli | |
| 1997 | Dead Men Can't Dance | Shooter | |
| 1998 | Susan's Plan | Paul Holland | |
| 1999 | Convergence | Brady Traub / Young Brady | |
| 2000 | Highlander: Endgame | Duncan MacLeod | |
| 2000 | Merlin: The Return | Lancelot | |
| 2001 | The Breed | Aaron Gray | |
| 2001 | The Void | Professor Steven Price | |
| 2002 | Storm Watch | Neville | |
| 2003 | Nemesis Game | Vern | |
| 2003 | Alien Tracker | Cole | Also executive producer |
| 2004 | Moscow Heat | Andrew Chambers | |
| 2005 | Throttle | Gavin Matheson | |
| 2005 | Little Chicago | Frank Newcome | |
| 2006 | Séance | Spence | |
| 2009 | Eyeborgs | Robert J. "Gunner" Reynolds | |
| 2009 | The Heavy | Christian Mason | |
| 2009 | Nine Miles Down | Thomas "Jack" Jackman | |
| 2011 | Cold Fusion | Colonel Jack Unger | |
| 2012 | War of the Worlds: Goliath | Patrick O'Brien | Voice role |
| 2013 | AE: Apocalypse Earth | Lieutenant Frank Baum | |
| 2013 | Dante's Hell Animated | Ulysses | Voice role |
| 2014 | Black Rose | Matt Robinson | |
| 2014 | Apocalypse Pompeii | Jeff Pierce | |
| 2014 | Outpost 37 | General Dane | Voice role |
| 2015 | Touched | Brad | |
| 2015 | Kids vs Monsters | Greg Lovett | |
| 2016 | The Secrets of Emily Blair | Roizman | |
| 2017 | The Fast and the Fierce | Coleman | |
| 2017 | Christmas Crime Story | David Carlisle | |
| 2018 | Snap Shot | Alden Flower | |
| 2019 | Wild League | James Parker | |
| TBA | Wildfire: The Legend of the Cherokee Ghost Horse | Parker Nichols | Post-production |

=== Television ===
| Year | Title | Role | Notes |
|---|---|---|---|
| 1986–1987 | The Colbys | Nikolai "Kolya" Rostov | 19 episodes |
| 1988 | Shooter | Ian | Television film |
| 1988 | Beauty and the Beast | Dmitri Benko | Episode: "Ashes, Ashes" |
| 1989–1990 | War of the Worlds | John Kincaid | 20 episodes |
| 1991 | Dark Shadows | Jeremiah Collins | 3 episodes |
| 1991 | The Owl | The Owl | Television film |
| 1992 | Murder, She Wrote | Edward Hale | Episode: "Danse Diabolique" |
| 1992 | Tarzán | Jack Traverse | 2 episodes |
| 1992–1998 | Highlander: The Series | Duncan MacLeod | 117 episodes |
| 1993 | The Cover Girl Murders | Patrice | Television film |
| 1995 | Phantom 2040 | Gunnar | Voice role, 2 episodes |
| 2001 | Relic Hunter | Lucas Blackmer | Episode: "Vampire's Kiss" |
| 2001–2002 | Tracker | Cole / Daggon | 22 episodes, also executive producer |
| 2003 | Charmed | Jeric | Episode: "Y Tu Mummy También" |
| 2005 | Phantom Below | Commander Frank Habley | Television film |
| 2007 | Highlander: The Source | Duncan MacLeod | Television film |
| 2007 | Wraiths of Roanoke | Ananias Dare | Television film |
| 2009 | The Immortal Voyage of Captain Drake | Sir Francis Drake | Television film |
| 2013 | Deadly Descent: The Abominable Snowman | Mark Forster | Television film |
| 2013 | The Confession | Dylan Bennett | Television film |
| 2015 | Strike Back | Commandant Leitner | Episode: "5.9" |
| 2015 | Stormageddon | Brian McTeague | Television film |
| 2017 | 12 to Midnight | Father Templain | Episode: "Red Sneakers" |
| 2019 | Arrow | Dante | 3 episodes |
| 2022 | S.W.A.T. | Peter Galloway | S5/E18 - "Incoming" |

=== Music videos ===
| Year | Song | Director(s) | Notes |
|---|---|---|---|
| 1981 | "My Own Way" | Russell Mulcahy | |
| 1988 | "Eyes of a Stranger" | Wayne Isham | |
| 1988 | "Days Like This" | Brian Grant | |

=== Stage ===
| Production | Year | Role | Theatre | Notes |
|---|---|---|---|---|
| Bouncers | 1987 | Ralph | Minetta Lane Theatre | |
