= Paul Collins (actor) =

British actor (born 1937)

- Born: 25 July 1937 (age 89); London, England
- Occupation: Actor
- Years active: 1949–2018
- Known for: Original voice of John Darling in Disney's Peter Pan (1953)
- Children: 1

Paul Collins (born 25 July 1937) is a British actor, long based in the United States. He is best known for his role as John Darling in the 1953 Walt Disney Pictures animated film Peter Pan, and as SecNav Alexander Nelson on the long-running series JAG.

== Filmography ==
Film

- Peter Pan (1953) - John Darling (voice)
- Without A Trace (1983) - Reporter
- Funny About Love (1990) - Bill Hatcher
- Guilty by Suspicion (1991) - Bernard
- The Marrying Man (1991) - Butler
- Defenseless (1991) - Campaign Worker
- For Richer, For Poorer (1992, TV Movie) - Stuart
- Dave (1993) - Secretary of Treasury
- Executive Decision (1996) - Nelson
- Mother (1996) - Lawyer
- Dead Man on Campus (1998) - Professor Durkheim
- Instinct (1999) - Tom Hanley
- The Breed (2001) - Calmet
- XXX: State of the Union (2005) - NSA Director Bill Brody
- Art School Confidential (2006) - Professor Divid Zipkin
- Evan Almighty (2007) - Congressman Stamp
- Montana Amazon (2012) - Bill

Television

- Hawaii Five-O (1969) - Charlie
- Matlock (1989) - Jim Melbourne
- Star Trek: Deep Space Nine (1993) - Zlangco
- Beverly Hills, 90210 (1993–1995) - John Bardwell
- JAG (1995–2002) - SecNav Alexander Nelson / Secretary of War John C. Spencer / Mort Reese
- Profiler (1997–1998) - US Attorney
- Scrubs (2001) - Dr. Benson
- West Wing (2005) - US Senator Sam Wilkinson
- Guiding Light (2007) - Tyler Meade
- Elementary (2018) - King Wilhelm

Video games

- Metal Gear Solid 3: Snake Eater (2004) - CIA Director (English version, voice)
- Metal Gear Solid 3: Subsistence (2005) - CIA Director (English version, voice)
