= Genghis Khan (unfinished film) =

- Directed by: Ken Annakin
- Screenplay by: James Carrington; Andrzej Krakowski; Bulat Mansurov
- Production company: International Cinema CO
- Countries: United Kingdom; Italy; USSR; USA
- Language: English
- Budget: $30 million

Genghis Khan is an uncompleted film and miniseries. Production taking place around 1991, it was scheduled for release in 1992.

== Premise ==
The film is the story of Temudjin, later Genghis Khan, who became the emperor of Mongolia.

== Cast ==
- Richard Tyson as Genghis Khan
- Charlton Heston as Togrul, Mongol warlord
- Rodney A. Grant as Jamuga
- Pat Morita as The Emperor
- Julia Nickson-Soul as Bortei, Khan's wife
- Robert Ginty
- James Mitchum
- Bekim Fehmiu
- John Saxon
- Daniel Greene
- Richard Hatch
- Chris Gable
- Rod Steiger
- Mario Novelli
- Omar Sharif
- Henry Silva
- Patricia O'Neal
- Louis Gossett Jr

== Production ==
Nicholas Rispoli, son of the producer, later recalled the film was "very, very complex":

It first started with the Kyrgyz director Tolomush Okeyev but after a while we realised that it wasn’t working for us so we restarted with the English director Peter Duffell. His version started from Genghis Khan’s childhood, so obviously the script, actors, etc. were changed several times but again it wasn’t suitable for an international audience. After millions of dollars had been spent, with a factory for the costumes designed by the master Ugo Pericoli set up in Mongolia, we restarted everything again and Ken Annakin came in as director, with Antonio Margheriti (Antony M. Dawson) as second unit director.

Annakin was offered the film by Harry Bernsen. He went to Rome to meet the producer Renzo Rispoli, then rewrote three two-hour scripts with James Carrington. He then went to Bishkek, capital of Kyrgyzstan for filming. Referring to Khan, "He can be a monster as most people know him," said Annakin, "the other side is more like a country boy with a peasant mentality." There were over 20,000 extras.

Annakin said the cast was made up of 14 American actors, plus 52 Russians and 15 Chinese. Boris Yeltsin visited the set. Annakin worked for 28 weeks including eight weeks in China. Nicholas Rispoli said "He shot for more than a year in four different countries: Mongolia, China, Uzbekistan and Kyrgyzstan. His shooting is magic and modern, with beautiful colorful scenes and big battles (not all CGI, or super unbelievable like now) with hundreds of horses and extras. He found wonderful landscapes that gives an epic touch to the scenes."

The plan was to cut a six-hour mini series which would then be also cut into a feature. However the producer went bankrupt which meant the film was not finished. Rispoli said "without a logical reason the various financial institutions involved, who had already financed millions and millions of dollars, didn’t want to cover the post-production costs, and the completion bond insurance didn’t want to pay… It was a very odd happening… strange. Big legal fights began but everything was only legally solved in... 2008/ 2010 for Genghis Khan. We were not only stuck for funds but mostly because all parties claimed the property for both the productions." A similar problem happened on another film by the same producer, And Quiet Flows the Don.

Star Richard Tyson had just appeared in Kindergarten Cop and says making the film interrupted the momentum of his career:

It was supposed to come out around the time of Braveheart, and it was just a perfect, biographical story about a real guy. If that had come out, who knows? The sky would have been the limit. It was an Italian company, and they never released it. It’s still sitting in a vault in Rome. If it had come out on ABC like it should have … you know, I was the lead. I could have written my ticket, but it never came out. I was gone to Russia for a year. Doing a miniseries is like doing four or five movies. That means none of those movies came out the next year. All of a sudden I was gone for three years. People thought, What the hell happened to Richard Tyson? I dropped off the edge of the world. I said no to Universal, but I couldn’t have predicted the outcome. I thought doing a miniseries was fantastic. Hopefully we can resurrect that some day.

In his memoirs, Charlton Heston said he had "a small but interesting part" but the film "had gone very badly; indeed it was never finished. It was a multinational production and they ran out of money. I’m afraid my makeup man, Nick Dudman, and I were the only people in the company who got paid (and that only because my agent, Jack Gilardi, made them put all the money in a U.S. bank before we left the States)."

In 2019 Nicholas Rispoli was still seeking funds to complete the mini series.
