= The Sound of Silence (Grey's Anatomy) =

- Grey's Anatomy episode
- Richard Webber (Pickens Jr.) offers advice to Meredith Grey (Pompeo) after the attack.
- Episode no.: Season 12; Episode 9
- Directed by: Denzel Washington
- Written by: Stacy McKee
- Original air date: February 11, 2016
- Running time: 43 minutes

Guest appearances
- Giacomo Gianniotti as Dr. Andrew DeLuca; Joe Adler as Dr. Isaac Cross; Samantha Sloyan as Dr. Penelope Blake; Dohn Norwood as Lou

Episode chronology
← Previous "Things We Lost in the Fire"	Next → "All I Want is You"
- Grey's Anatomy season 12

"The Sound of Silence" is the ninth episode and the mid-season premiere of the twelfth season of the American medical drama television series Grey's Anatomy, and the 254th episode overall. Written by Stacy McKee and directed by Denzel Washington, the episode aired on the American Broadcasting Company (ABC) in the United States on February 11, 2016.

The episode centers on Meredith Grey (Ellen Pompeo) being viciously attacked by a patient, resulting in severe injuries. The doctors at Grey Sloan Memorial work together to aid her recovery and stand by her through the traumatic aftermath. Additional storylines include Alex Karev (Justin Chambers) grappling with the aftermath of his proposal to Jo Wilson (Camilla Luddington), and Jackson Avery (Jesse Williams) serving divorce papers to his estranged wife April Kepner (Sarah Drew).

Upon its original broadcast, "The Sound of Silence" was watched by 8.28 million viewers in the United States, ranking #3 for the night, and earned a 2.4/8 Nielsen rating in the 18–49 demographic. The episode received universal acclaim, with widespread praise for its direction, writing, and Pompeo's performance.

== Plot ==
The episode opens with a voice-over narration from Meredith Grey (Ellen Pompeo) about finding your voice and breaking the silence in a world that often drowns you out.

Meredith Grey (Ellen Pompeo), Maggie Pierce (Kelly McCreary), and Alex Karev (Justin Chambers) are stuck in traffic while carpooling to work, which turns out to be caused by a serious road accident. Upon arriving at the hospital, the doctors immediately jump into action to treat the accident victims. Meredith teams up with Penny Blake (Samantha Sloyan) and Ben Warren (Jason George) to tend to Lou (Dohn Norwood), a patient requiring neurological care. Ben calls in Amelia Shepherd (Caterina Scorsone) for a consult, but she chooses to assist Owen Hunt (Kevin McKidd) instead, still avoiding Meredith due to their unresolved conflict.

Left alone with the patient, Meredith faces a life-threatening situation when Lou, disoriented and suffering from post-seizure hyper-aggression, violently attacks her. Penny finds Meredith unconscious and immediately calls for help. The hospital staff, including Richard Webber (James Pickens Jr.), April Kepner (Sarah Drew), Callie Torres (Sara Ramirez), Owen, Maggie, Ben, Jackson Avery (Jesse Williams) and Alex Karev (Justin Chambers) rush to save Meredith, whose injuries are severe. As Meredith begins her recovery, she discovers that she has lost both her ability to speak and her hearing as a result of the assault. The episode then shifts to Meredith's perspective, engulfed in silence, as she navigates her post-injury world.

Throughout her recovery, Alex remains by Meredith's side, trying to lift her spirits. He eventually notices that her hearing has returned when she reacts to one of his jokes. Miranda Bailey (Chandra Wilson) later informs Meredith that Lou has been discharged after undergoing surgery. Though Lou asks to meet with Meredith to apologize for the attack, she refuses to see him. As Arizona Robbins (Jessica Capshaw) helps Meredith prepare for a visit from her children, the reunion takes a heartbreaking turn when the kids, frightened by their mother's condition, run away in fear. This triggers a panic attack for Meredith, during which Penny intervenes and removes the wires from her jaw, against medical protocol, prompting Jackson to reprimand Penny for compromising Meredith's healing.

Amelia eventually visits Meredith to apologize for their earlier falling out and opens up about her struggles with sobriety. She admits she is terrified of losing Meredith, but Meredith, still processing her trauma, says she is not ready to forgive her. Richard Webber takes Meredith outside for some fresh air and delivers a heartfelt speech about the importance of forgiveness. He urges her to forgive Amelia, Penny, Derek, and—most importantly—herself. With Richard's guidance, Meredith agrees to meet Lou. In a poignant scene, Lou, accompanied by his wife and daughters, offers a sincere apology. Though still unable to speak, Meredith takes his hand, signaling her forgiveness.

Once Meredith is fully recovered and discharged from the hospital, Alex helps her settle back at home. Grateful for his unwavering support, Meredith tells him that Jo Wilson (Camilla Luddington) needs him just as much, if not more, and encourages him to focus on his relationship with Jo. In the final moments, Meredith is reunited with her children, signaling the start of her journey toward healing.

== Production ==
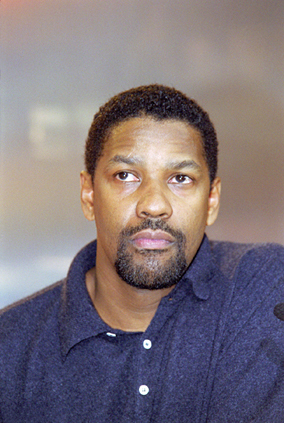
Denzel Washington made his television director debut on Grey's Anatomy.

The episode, running for approximately 43 minutes, was written by Stacy McKee and directed by Denzel Washington. It featured the songs "My Girl" and "I Surrender". In October 2015, TVLine announced that two-time Academy Award-winner Washington would direct the ninth episode of the season, marking his first foray into television directing. He had previously directed the films Antwone Fisher (2002) and The Great Debaters (2007). The table read for the episode took place on October 14, 2015, and filming began on October 20. Before the episode's release, a video leaked from the set showed Washington walking behind Chandra Wilson (Miranda Bailey), as she pushed Ellen Pompeo (Meredith Grey) in a wheelchair, leading to speculation about Meredith's injuries.

During the winter hiatus, it was confirmed by The Hollywood Reporter that Giacomo Gianniotti (Andrew DeLuca) had been promoted to series regular. Gianniotti had first appeared in Season 11 as part of the new group of interns.

The episode was heavily promoted by the American Broadcasting Company prior to its release. The network previewed Meredith suffering from multiple injuries, and a sneak peek showed a patient attacking her, though the motive was not revealed. The Daily Beast commented on the aggressive promotion, noting, "Footage of Pompeo's Meredith being beaten by a patient and left for dead has been marketed with the fervor of a network promoting a major event episode."

In an interview with Entertainment Weekly, Pompeo called the episode "the best thing I've ever done on the show," and praised Washington's direction, saying, "His charisma changes the energy in the room completely. Everybody is just at the top of their game." Shonda Rhimes, the show's executive producer, described the episode as "extraordinary and very powerful", highlighting that it centered on Meredith, setting the tone for the second half of the season.

=== On-set conflict between Pompeo and Washington ===
In 2021, on her podcast Tell Me with Ellen Pompeo featuring Patrick Dempsey, Ellen Pompeo revealed that she had an intense confrontation with Denzel Washington during the production of the episode he directed. Pompeo recalled that Washington took issue with her improvising dialogue, leading her to respond, "Listen, motherfucker, this is my show. This is my set. Who are you telling? You barely know where the bathroom is." She added that while the situation eventually calmed down, she felt that "[Washington] doesn't know shit about directing TV."

The story quickly went viral, receiving widespread media coverage and sparking criticism of Pompeo for her perceived disrespect towards Washington. Many fans and commentators expressed their disappointment over her remarks, accusing her of being unprofessional toward the esteemed actor and director.

When asked about the incident by Variety, Washington initially stated that he didn't remember the confrontation but later added, "But it's all good."

== Release ==
"The Sound of Silence" was originally broadcast on February 11, 2016 on the American Broadcasting Company (ABC) in the United States. It served as the mid-season premiere for the twelfth season of the show. Upon its initial release, the episode was watched by a total of 8.28 million viewers and earned a 2.4/8 rating in the key 18-49 demographic, according to Nielsen ratings, reflecting a slight decrease from the previous episode, "Things We Lost in the Fire", which had been viewed by 8.50 million and garnered a 2.5/8 rating/share. The episode ranked 17th in overall viewership and 6th in the 18-49 demographic, making it the third-most watched drama of the night.

== Reception ==
"The Sound of Silence" received universal acclaim from television critics, with widespread praise for its direction, writing and Ellen Pompeo's performance as Meredith Grey.

TVLine gave Pompeo's performance the highest praise, calling it "visceral" and stating, "If a picture really says a thousand words, this review is superfluous: Any image we publish of Pompeo's stricken face from this week's Grey's will tell you all you need to know about her." The site described the episode as a "stunner" and lauded McKee's writing. They added, "We long ago gave up predicting what the Primetime Emmy Awards will do. But we will still say that, if there's any justice, Pompeo's transcendent work ought to get the leading lady at very least the nomination for which she is so long overdue".

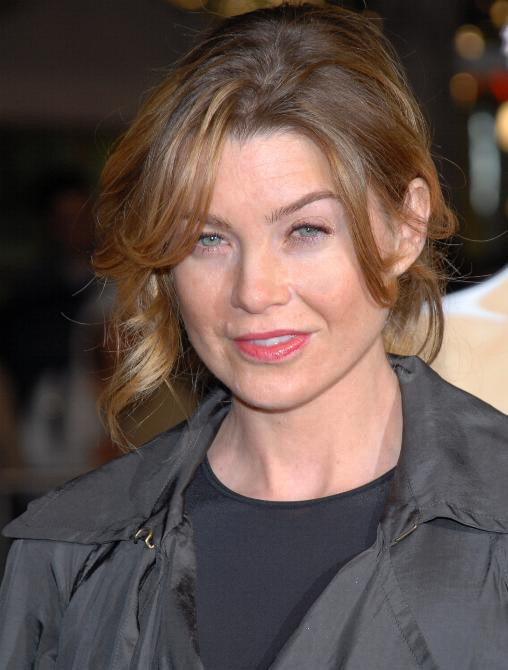
Critics highlighted Ellen Pompeo for her performance as Meredith Grey and her due for an Primetime Emmy Award.

Maggie Fremont of Vulture praised Pompeo for delivering the same kind of "powerhouse performance" seen in many of Grey's Anatomy's challenging storylines, remarking how "Shonda continues to throw horrible situations at Meredith". Gwen Inhat of The A.V. Club commended both Pompeo and Denzel Washington, calling them the "saving grace" that prevented the episode from becoming a typical "martyr-Meredith" storyline. She noted Washington "hit it out of the park" and described Pompeo as the "key player", stating, "Told only from her perspective, it's a powerhouse episode for her".

Janalen Samson of BuddyTV echoed similar sentiments, highlighting Pompeo's "excellent" portrayal and calling the episode a "showcase for her". Allanah Faherty of Moviepilot described the episode as an "emotional roller coaster" and "the perfect return to the series," further praising Pompeo's ability to "pull at our heartstrings".

Ashley Bissette Sumerel of TV Fanatic rated the episode 4/5, applauding Meredith's character development and calling the episode "phenomenal" as a standalone piece. She noted the 10 minutes of silence in the episode blew her mind, further exclaiming, "Please give Pompeo an Emmy!" Spoiler TV similarly lauded the episode as a "worthy and effective mid-season opener", singling out Pompeo's "frighteningly realistic" performance, Justin Chambers' "sensitive" portrayal of Alex Karev, and Stacy McKee's strong writing.

Ariana Bacle of Entertainment Weekly praised the episode as "a damn good hour", adding that Meredith "has gone through so much that she's earned an entire hour of TV completely focused on just her." Bacle also highlighted Washington's direction, specifically the portion of the episode filmed in complete silence, calling it "especially powerful because of the lack of sound". Lauren Hoffman from Cosmopolitan commended the episode for its "amazingly effective storytelling", praising the chemistry between Meredith and Alex. She also remarked on the creative synergy between Washington and Grey's Anatomy, noting that "Denzel and Grey's, despite being disparate, could bring each other to new creative heights".
