= Irina Apeksimova =

Russian stage and screen actress

- Ирина Апексимова
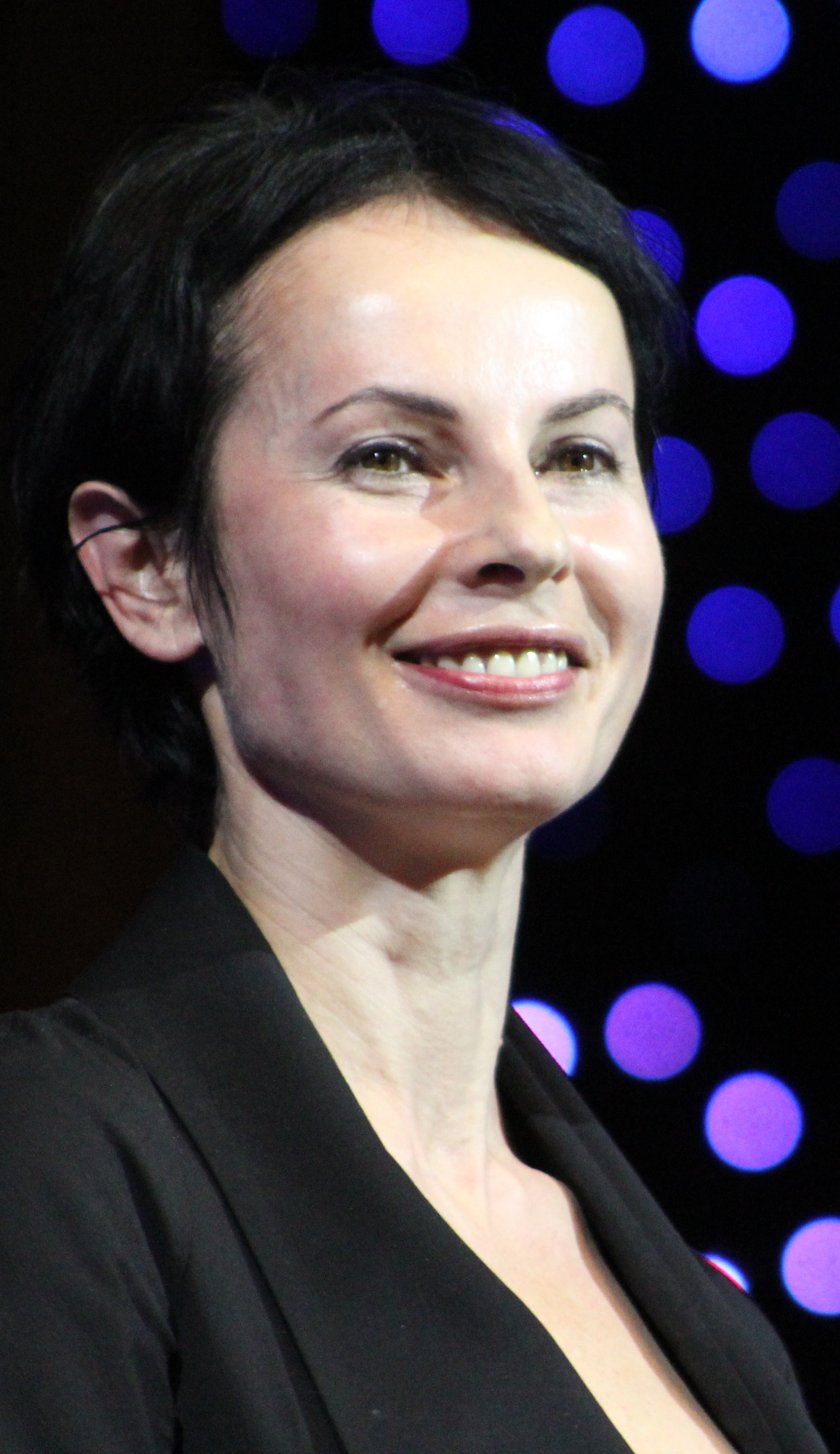
- Apeksimova in 2012
- Born: Irina Victorovna Apeksimova; January 13, 1966 (age 60); Volgograd, Russian SFSR, Soviet Union
- Occupations: Actress, theater director
- Years active: 1984–present

Irina Victorovna Apeksimova (Russian: Ири́на Ви́кторовна Апекси́мова, born January 13, 1966,) is a Russian stage and screen actress. She became director of the Taganka Theatre in March 2015.

== Biography ==
Apeksimova was the child of classical musicians, Victor Nikolaevich Apeksimov and Svetlana Yakolevna. Irina was the second child in the family; her older brother Valery later became a jazz composer and pianist in the United States.

Apeksimova's parents divorced when she was in the eighth grade, and she moved with her mother to Odessa, where she studied acting. After high school Apeksimova went to Moscow to enter the Moscow Art Theater School, but was rejected because of her Odessa accent. Back in Odessa, she joined the Odessa Opera Theater and danced for a year in the corps de ballet. She then applied again to the Moscow Art Theater School but was again rejected. After this setback, Irina returned to Volgograd and joined the Theater of Musical Comedy, in the corps de ballet.

After living in Volgograd for a year, Apeksimova had shed much of her Odessa accent, and applied for a third time to the Moscow Art Theater School. She was accepted and admitted in 1986 into Oleg Tabakov's class. Apeksimova graduated in 1990 and joined the studio at the Moscow Art Theatre, where she stayed until 2000. In 1994, she won the Best Actress Award at the Paris Film Festival for her role in the film October (Октябрь).

== Credits ==
=== Theatrical roles ===
- Skylark (Жаворонок). Director: Oleg Tabakov. Role: Agnes.
- Crazy Jourdain (Полоумный Журден). Director: Oleg Tabakov. Role: Dorimena
- Zatovarennaya's Barrels (Затоваренная бочкотара). Director: Eugene Kamenkovich.
- Armchair (Кресло).
- The Taming of the Shrew. Director: Brian Cox. Role: Katherina.
- Richard III. Director: Brian Cox. Role: Lady M.
- Uncle Vanya (Дядя Ваня). Director: Oleg Efremov. Role: Helena.
- Boris Godunov (Борис Годунов). Director: Oleg Efremov. Role: Marina Mniszech.
- Woe from Wit (Горе от ума). Director: Oleg Efremov. Role: Sofia.
- Hoffman (Гоффман). Director: Nikolai Skorik. Role: Julia.
- Masquerade (Маскарад). Director: Roman Kozak. Role: Baroness Shtral.
- Beautiful Life (Красивая жизнь). Director: Lanskoy.
- Tragedians and Comedians (Трагики и комедианты). Director: Nikolai Skorik. Role: Lisa.
- The Milk Train Doesn't Stop Here Anymore. Director: Dolgachev. Role: Blackie.
- Little Tragedies (Маленькие трагедии). Director: Roman Kozak. Role: Laura.
- Thunderstorm (Гроза). Director: Dmitri Brusnikin. Role: crazy lady.
- A Midsummer Night's Dream. Director: N. Sheiko. Role: Titania.
- Ondine (Ундина). Director: Nikolai Skorik. Role: Countess Bertha
- Archaeology (Археология). Director: Kochetkov.
- Dancing to the Sound of Rain (Танцы под шум дождя). Director: Nikolai Skorik. Role: muse.
- Unexpected Joy (Нечаянная радость). Director: Kolesnikov.
- Pearl Zinaida (Перламутровая Зинаида). Director: Oleg Efremov. Role: a foreigner.
- Blessed Island (Блаженный остров). Director: N. Sheiko.
- The Most Important Thing (Самое главное). Director: Roman Kozak.
- Seylemskie Witch (Сейлемские колдуньи). Director: Brian Cox.

=== Private Company roles ===
- Dangerous Liaisons. Director: Sergei Vinogradov. Role: Marquise.
- www.london.ru. Director: Stein.
- Dinner with a Fool (Ужин с дураком). Director: V. Trushkin. Role: Marlene.
- The Cherry Orchard (Вишнёвый сад). Director: E. Nekrosius. Role: Charlotte.

=== Film roles ===
In addition to her many roles in Russian films, Apeksimova acted in the 1997 Hollywood Val Kilmer vehicle The Saint. She starred in the 1999 film The Book of Masters, the first Russian film by an arm of The Walt Disney Company (the CIS division).

- 1992 Melochi zhizni (TV)
- 1995 What a Mess!
- 1997 The Saint
- 2000 Empire under Attack
- 2003 Red Serpent
- 2005 Yesenin (TV)
- 2007 Against all Better Judgement
- 2009 The Book of Masters
