= Playing with Dolls: Bloodlust =

2016 film directed by Rene Perez

- Official release poster
- Directed by: Rene Perez
- Written by: Rene Perez
- Produced by: Rene Perez; Kerry Wallum
- Starring: Richard Tyson; Karin Brauns; Ian Dalziel; Elonda Seawood; Colin Bryant; Marilyn Robrahn
- Cinematography: Rene Perez
- Edited by: Rene Perez
- Music by: Rene Perez
- Production companies: iDiC Entertainment; Gravitas Ventures
- Distributed by: Edel SE & Co. KGaA
- Release date: January 21, 2016 (Germany)
- Running time: 81 minutes
- Country: United States
- Language: English

Playing with Dolls: Bloodlust is a 2016 American slasher film written and directed by Rene Perez. A sequel to the 2015 film Playing with Dolls. It stars Richard Tyson, Karin Brauns, Ian Dalziel, Elonda Seawood, Colin Bryant and Marilyn Robrahn.

The film was released on January 21, 2016.

== Plot ==
Stina, a down-on-her-luck single mother teetering on the edge of survival. With bills piling up and a child to feed, she's one step away from entering the adult entertainment industry until salvation seemingly arrives in the form of a mysterious invitation. A reality show promises her one million dollars and a role in a horror movie, if she can endure a simple challenge survive being hunted by a masked killer in a remote forest.

She’s joined by other contestants, including Magnus, a former soldier lured into the game after being hired as a bodyguard for a participant who drops out. Hoping to secure a better future for his own son, Magnus accepts the offer without realizing he’s stepping into a real-life nightmare.

The contestants are flown to a secluded woodland cabin, rigged with hidden cameras and surrounded by ominous silence. They're told it’s all part of the show but it soon becomes horrifyingly clear that there’s no crew, no producers, and no rules. Watching from a hidden surveillance bunker is a man known only as The Watcher, a shadowy figure orchestrating the entire affair for his personal amusement. The show is merely a front for a sadistic live-streamed slaughter.

Prisoner AYO-886, a towering, masked brute whose presence signals nothing but death. The killings begin swiftly and mercilessly. Rodrigo, one of the contestants, wanders too far from the cabin and is ambushed. AYO-886 smashes his skull with a hammer, the blow echoing through the trees like a death knell.

Nico, another participant, meets a crueler fate. She’s captured, bound to a tree, and mutilated in an especially grotesque sequence. Her face is disfigured, her body twisted into a mockery of life, as if the killer was trying to make her resemble a rotting corpse. It’s the kind of image that burns into your brain long after the credits roll.

The film doesn’t let up. In one of the most brutal scenes, an unnamed woman becomes the victim of pure butchery. Her arm is slowly and painfully severed with a rusted hacksaw. Before she can scream, her head is obliterated by a sledgehammer, her blood spraying across the forest floor in a moment of sheer, unflinching horror.

Stina and Magnus, now fully aware of the deadly trap they’re in, attempt to escape the nightmare. But AYO-886 stalks them like a ghost in the woods relentless, silent, and impossibly strong. As the bodies pile up, Magnus confronts the killer in a final, desperate fight. The outcome is never revealed. The screen fades to black, leaving their fates—and the viewers—suspended in dreadful ambiguity.

The Watcher remains in his bunker, silently observing the carnage. His expression never changes, and as one hunt ends, he begins preparing for the next.

== Cast ==
- Richard Tyson as The Watcher / Scopophilio
- Karin Brauns as Stina (Karin Isabell Brauns)
- Elonda Seawood as Nico
- Colin Bryant as Magnus
- Marilyn Robrahn as Trudy
- Killer as AYO-886, Prisoner
- Andrew Espinoza Long as Rodrigo
- Leia Perez as Stina's Daughter
- Logan Serr as Magnuses Son
- Ian Dalziel as Mr. King
- Kerry Wallum as Commando 1
- Kaula Reed as Ex-Mrs. Magnus
- Omnia Bixler as Call Girl
- Emma Chase Robertson as Victim 1
- Joey Bertschi as Commando 2

== Release ==
The film was released in Germany on January 21, 2016. The film was released to Blu-ray on April 6, 2018.

== Sequel ==
A third movie titled Playing with Dolls: Havoc was released on July 18, 2017.

== Reception ==
Sofia Sinema of Letterboxd gave the film 2 stars and she wrote: Catching up with the MCU slowly. The Metalface Cinematic Universe, that is. Love the solo dance teases and bared breasts, but an offscreen kill for your finest doll? And WTF happened to the ending? That was rather premature. Oh well...one man wrecking crew Rene Perez has already made about a dozen more features since this. There's bound to be some hits and misses when you're grinding at that pace. I'll be back for more pain. You can count on them apples. 4.1/10
