= Liar's Poker (film) =

- Directed by: Jeff Santo
- Written by: Jeff Santo
- Produced by: Jeff Santo; Carlos H. Sánchez
- Starring: Richard Tyson; Caesar Luisi; Jimmy Blondell; Flea
- Cinematography: Giles Dunning
- Edited by: Kathryn Himoff
- Music by: Peter Himmelman
- Production company: Savino Brothers
- Distributed by: North Branch Entertainment
- Release date: 10 June 1998 (Chicago Alt.film Fest)
- Running time: 93 minutes
- Country: United States
- Language: English

Liar's Poker is a 1998 American crime drama film directed by Jeff Santo, starring Richard Tyson, Caesar Luisi, Jimmy Blondell and Flea.

== Cast ==
- Richard Tyson as Jack
- Caesar Luisi as Niko
- Jimmy Blondell as Vic
- Flea as Frankie
- Neith Hunter as Brooke
- Pamela Gidley as Linda
- Amelia Heinle as Rebecca
- Colin Patrick Lynch as Art

== Release ==
The film premiered at the Chicago Alt.film Fest on 10 June 1998.

== Reception ==
Michael Speier of Variety wrote that while the film " gets more creative toward its finale", it "can’t atone" for "narrative inconsistencies", "very bland acting" and the "lack of personality development".

Derek Armstrong of TV Guide wrote that "The viewer will give up on the plot ten minutes in, not because it's too complex, but because the script never bothers even to lay the groundwork", and Santos' "amateurish, pointless cross-cutting takes over from there."

Eric Harrison of the Los Angeles Times wrote that the film "plays like a young filmmaker’s attempt to see how much he could strip from his story without losing the audience" and that "Character, motivation, most of the plot--this movie’s been boiled so hard they all dropped from its bones."
