= Playing with Dolls =

2015 American film

- Official release poster
- Directed by: Rene Perez
- Written by: Barry Massoni; Rene Perez
- Produced by: Billy La Traille; David A. Lockhart; iDiC Entertainment
- Starring: Natasha Blasick; Richard Tyson; Charlie Glackin; Alanna Forte; David A. Lockhart
- Cinematography: Rene Perez
- Edited by: Rene Perez
- Music by: The Darkest Machines
- Distributed by: Edel Media & Entertainment; Trans World Associates
- Release date: 6 March 2015 (Germany)
- Running time: 80 minutes
- Country: United States
- Language: English

Playing with Dolls is a 2015 American slasher film directed by Rene Perez, co-written by Perez and Barry Massoni. It starred Natasha Blasick, Richard Tyson, Charlie Glackin, Alanna Forte, David A. Lockhart.

== Plot ==
Cindy Tremaine (Natasha Blasick) is a struggling young woman facing dire circumstances. After her roommate abandons her, leaving her unable to pay rent, and her employer unjustly fires her, Cindy finds herself desperate and vulnerable. Her landlord, exploiting her situation, pressures her for sexual favors in exchange for rent forgiveness.

Amidst this turmoil, Cindy receives an unexpected job offer: a lucrative position as a housekeeper for a wealthy client who is currently abroad. Provided with a vehicle and directions, she travels to a secluded cabin nestled deep within the woods.

Unbeknownst to her, the cabin is under constant surveillance by a mysterious voyeur known as The Watcher (Richard Tyson). This individual has orchestrated a deadly game by releasing Prisoner AYO-886, a masked serial killer, into the area to stalk and terrorize Cindy.

As Cindy settles into the cabin, she begins to experience unsettling occurrences, unaware that she is being watched and hunted. The tension escalates as the killer draws closer, leading to a harrowing game of cat and mouse. Cindy's fight for survival becomes increasingly desperate as she attempts to escape the deadly trap set for her.

The film concludes with an abrupt ending, leaving the confrontation between Cindy, the killer, and The Watcher unresolved.

== Controversies ==
After an unsuccessful run under its original title, in 2017, Lightning Pictures released the DVD in the united Kingdom under the title Leatherface: The Legend Lives On. The new title was criticized as a fraudulent attempt to confuse viewers into thinking that the film was Leatherface, the eighth installment of the Texas Chainsaw Massacre franchise, also released in 2017.

Perez released a statement to the Dread Central site:

"I am apposed [sic] to this title change but I am powerless to stop it. I made no money from this sale. The sales agency didn’t even inform me that a sale was made to the UK. I was unaware until I saw this article. At the moment I am making a 3rd Playing with Dolls movie. I will be self releasing the new Playing with Dolls online to avoid any issues like this in the future. Apologies to my fellow horror fans for this title change."

== Also known as ==
- (original title) Playing with Dolls
- UK (reissue title) Leatherface: The Legend Lives On
- USA (alternative title) Metalface

== Cast ==
- Natasha Blasick as Cindy
- Richard Tyson as The Watcher / Scopophilio
- Charlie Glackin as Prisoner AYO-886 / the Killer
- Alanna Forte as Victim Number 1
- David A. Lockhart as Burnett
- Allisun Sturges as the Lawyer

== Sequels ==
A sequel, titled Playing with Dolls: Bloodlust, was released in Germany on January 21, 2016.

A third movie titled Playing with Dolls: Havoc was released on July 18, 2017.

A fourth movie, titled Cry Havoc, was released on May 5, 2020.

== Reception ==
Corey Danna of Horrornews.net rate the film ½ out of 5 and wrote: If you’re expecting a non-stop slaughter fest you will be let down. If you have the patience, you may find the cat and mouse shenanigans a frightening prospect. If a sequel does happen, Perez will need to pick up the pace, it works for this one film, next time he will have to take it to the next level.

Travis Lytle from Letterboxd gave the film 2 stars and he wrote: Strangely entertaining despite its best efforts otherwise, "Playing with Dolls" (also known as the on-the-nose "Metalface") is a bottom-wrung horror film filled with misplaced action beats, tinny production values, and questionable performances. Finding a down-on-her-luck protagonist taking a caretaking job at a distant estate, the film follows as she is stalked by a masked murderer and recorded by a series of cameras placed around the property. A policeman on the scene mucks up the horror by adding a winky tone and the aforementioned action threads, but it is these additions that salvage the threadbare production and stunted story from being utter garbage. Instead, it all lands as semi-utter garbage.
