= Hafedh Dakhlaoui =

French actor

- حافظ الدخلاوي
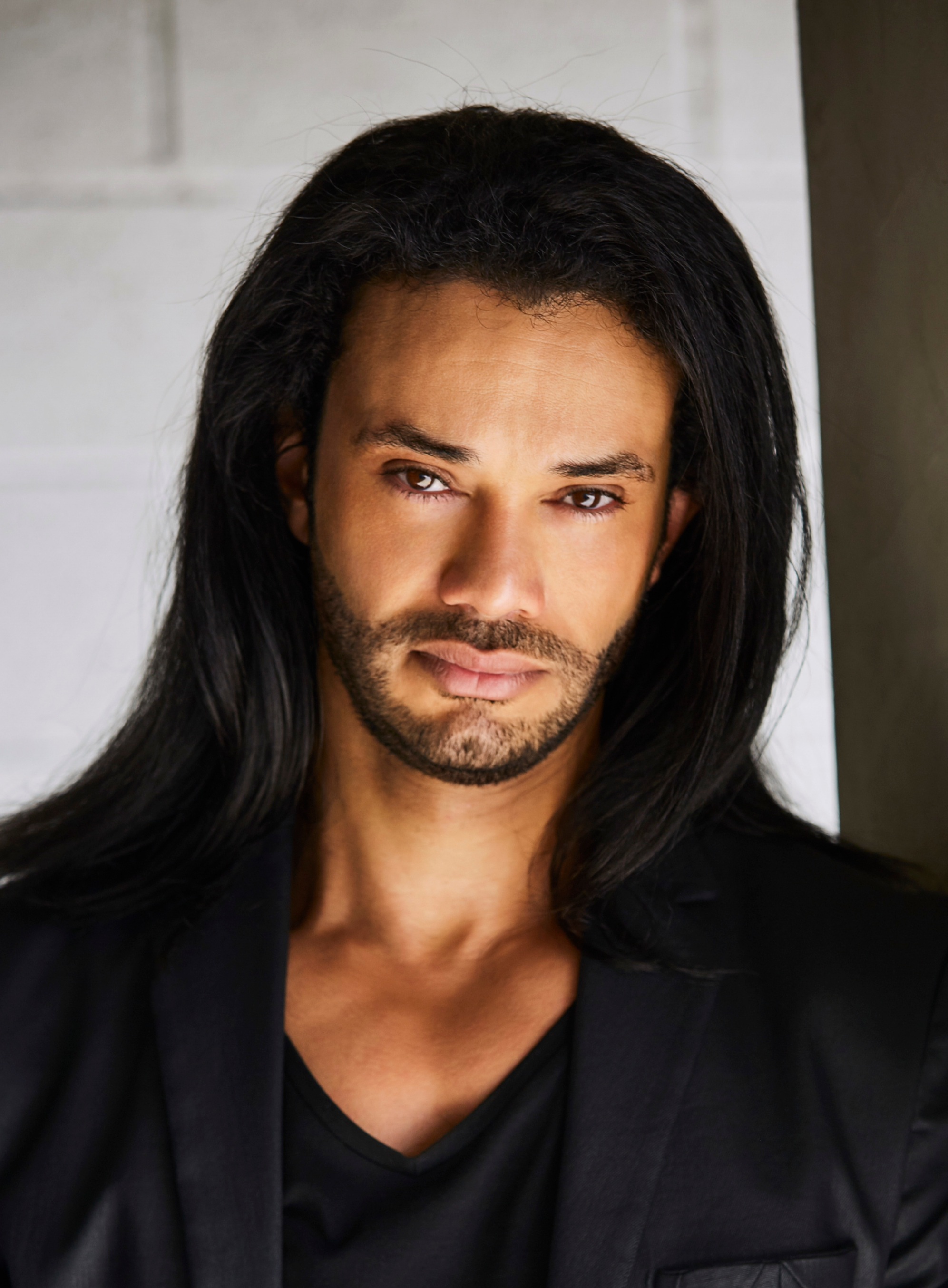
- Born: January 20, 1986 (age 40); La Marsa, Tunisia
- Occupation: Actor
- Years active: 2004–present
- Website: Official website

Hafedh Dakhlaoui (Arabic: حافظ الدخلاوي; born January 20, 1986, La Marsa, Tunisia) is a French actor born in Tunisia and based in Sydney.

== Early life and career ==
Dakhlaoui was born in La Marsa, Tunisia to Tunisian swimming champion parents. Dakhlaoui started his acting career at an early age through his school's theater. When he was 15, he acted in Nadia and Sarra, a French-Tunisian film directed by Moufida Tlatli. In 2014, Dakhlaoui appeared in Black Rose, a Russian-American action film, as Max. In the same year, he played Cole's Bodyguard in Showdown in Manila, filmed in the Philippines. In 2015, Dakhlaoui appeared in Maximum Impact, directed by Andrzej Bartkowiak. In 2019, he appeared in Wild League, playing Alexander. The following year, he starred in Octopus Pot with Mykel Shannon Jenkins, played the lead in the movie They called me Keith, and played Walker in The Spy Who Never Dies.

== Filmography ==
Television and film roles
Year	Title	Role	Notes
2004	Nadia et Sarra	Rayan	
2013	Turf	Guest	
2014	Black Rose	Max	
2016	Showdown in Manila	Ghost	
2017	Riviera	Negresco's Man	
2017	Fifty Shades Darker	swimmer	Won BMI Film & TV Awards 2017
2017	Alibi.com	Walker	French comedy film
2017	Maximum Impact	Goon 1	
2018	Made in Chelsea	Cluber	Episode #15.9
2019	Wild League	Alexander	
2020	The Gods 2	Ghostavo	
2020	Octopus Pot	Esteban	
2020	The Spy Who Never Dies	The Dog Walker	Filming
2020	They Called Me Keith	Ryan	Short
2021	Bonded by Blue	Security	Short
2021	Mega Heist	Bouncer	Short
2021	Sayonee	Pheroun	TV Short
2021	Deadly women	Rahim's crew	TV series documentary
2021	Flawsome: Sex, Drugs & Recipes	Serge	TV mini series
2022	Barons	Carlito	TV series
