= Showdown in Manila =

- Directed by: Mark Dacascos
- Screenplay by: Craig Hamann
- Produced by: Mark Dacascos; Andrzej Bartkowiak; Alexander Nevsky; Alexander Izotov; Christopher R. Santiago (Associate producer)
- Starring: Alexander Nevsky; Casper Van Dien; Cary-Hiroyuki Tagawa; Tia Carrere
- Cinematography: Rudy Harbon
- Edited by: Stephen Adrianson
- Music by: Sean Murray
- Production company: Hollywood Storm
- Distributed by: CineTel Films
- Release dates: February 18, 2016 (Russia); January 19, 2018 (U.S.)
- Running time: 90 minutes
- Countries: Philippines; United States
- Languages: English; Filipino
- Box office: $583,194 (Russia)

Showdown in Manila is a 2016 Russian-American action film directed by Mark Dacascos. The film was released on February 18, 2016, in Russian (with English scenes captioned) and on January 19, 2018, in English (with Russian scenes dubbed) worldwide.

== Plot ==
Nickolay "Nick" Peyton, a police officer of Russian origin, lives in Manila. During a sting operation Nick is badly wounded and retires from police. Today he works as a private detective with his partner Charlie.

One day, Mrs. Wells comes to hire them to investigate the strange murder of her husband. The search for the murderers leads Nick and Charlie to a base of criminals in the jungle. The gangsters' leader Aldric Cole was wounded by Nick in a past police operation. Nick and Charlie gather a group of former elite soldiers to destroy the base.

== Cast ==
- Alexander Nevsky as Moscow Police Force SWAT Sergeant Nickolay "Nick" Peyton
- Casper Van Dien as LAPD S.W.A.T. Officer Iv Charlie Benz
- Cary-Hiroyuki Tagawa as Aldric Cole
- Tia Carrere as Mrs. Wells
- Mark Dacascos as Matthew Wells (cameo appearance)
- Matthias Hues as Dorn
- Hafedh Dakhlaoui as "Ghost"
- Don "The Dragon" Wilson as Delta Force Master Sergeant Michael Dillon
- Cynthia Rothrock as Delta Force Lieutenant Haines
- Olivier Gruner as Delta Force Sergeant First Class Ford
- Dmitri Dyuzhev as Delta Force Sergeant Victor Selensky
- Robert Madrid as Carlos
- Iza Calzado as Sabio
- Maria Bravikova as Sofia
- Jake Macapagal as Kalalo
- Hazel Faith Dela Cruz as Kiki
- Moises Magisa as Mr. Camato
- Mon Confiado as Datu
- Patrick Carlos as MPD S.W.A.T. Officer Reyes
- Don Gordon Bell as Minter
- Polina Butorina as Larissa
- Trixie Dauz as Miss Divina
- Natalie Gubina as Alyson
- Michael Dyakonov as Anton
- Rich Valencia as Dorn's Girl / Dancer
- Krista Miller as Vivian (uncredited)

== Production ==
The film was shot in Manila (Philippines).

== Critical reception ==
On the review aggregator website Rotten Tomatoes, 0% of 6 critics' reviews are positive, with an average rating of 2.4/10.
