= Peace Fund =

The Peace Fund is a charitable organization, founded by Adrian Paul, dedicated to the worldwide improvement of the living, educational and health conditions of children. It meets this goal by distributing funds raised through various activities to organizations whose focus is the care of children. It may also create and manage direct programs to care for children in emergency situations.

The Peace Fund is also known by the acronym P.E.A.C.E, which stands for Protect Educate Aid Children Everywhere; indicating that protecting, educating and aiding children are the specific focus of their programs. P.E.A.C.E was founded by the actor Adrian Paul in 1998, in affiliation with the Athletes and Entertainers for Kids (AEFK) charitable organization. P.E.A.C.E has since become independent of the AEFK, operating for a time as a private charity until it applied for and received 501(c)(3) status as reported in a May 2006 press release. It runs celebrity memorabilia auctions, sells merchandise, participates in affiliated fundraising activities (such as Macy's Shop for a Cause) and accepts direct corporate and individual donations for the funding of its programs.

Celebrities such as Adrian Paul, Tom Welling, and Michael York have provided auction items, participated in and/or sponsored P.E.A.C.E events.

== Programs ==
The Peace Fund has several programs that focus on the well-being and protection of children such as the Celeb4Kids fundraising initiative. One such program is P.E.A.C.E. in Paradise, which began as an effort to provide aid for victims of the 2004 Indian Ocean earthquake. The organization also hosts programs that focus on child education such as School Makes a Difference and COTA.

== Organization ==
According to GuideStar, P.E.A.C.E is a 501c3, Community Foundation organization located in Sherman Oaks, California. GuideStar also reports that the organization is listed in IRS Publication 78 - the Cumulative List of Organizations, which lists all charitable organizations eligible to receive donor gifts that are United States Federal income tax deductible.

On its official website, P.E.A.C.E has listed its volunteer board, officers and staff; a comprehensive Statement of Values; its Code of Ethics policy; and declaration of its adoption of the IRS Conflict of Interest Policy as stated in IRS Form 1023.

The Code of Ethics is based upon The Statement of Values and Code of Ethics for Nonprofit and Philanthropic Organizations as recommended by the Association for Research on Nonprofit Organizations and Voluntary Action (ARNOVA).
