= The Void (2001 film) =

- Directed by: Gilbert M. Shilton
- Written by: Geri Cudia Barger; Gilbert M. Shilton
- Produced by: David Willson
- Starring: Amanda Tapping; Adrian Paul; Malcolm McDowell
- Cinematography: Attila Szalay
- Music by: Ross Vannelli
- Distributed by: Lions Gate Films
- Release date: September 27, 2001
- Running time: 93 minutes
- Country: United States
- Language: English

The Void is a 2001 American direct-to-DVD science fiction thriller film directed by Gilbert M. Shilton and starring Amanda Tapping, Adrian Paul, and Malcolm McDowell. Principal photography was completed in British Columbia, Canada.

== Synopsis ==
Dr. Thomas Abernathy, the owner of Filadyne company, is leading the experiment in the particle accelerator in Luxembourg to create a small black hole which would be used as the powerful energy source. Although another scientist Dr. Soderstrom, who is present at the test site, tries to stop the experiment due to the possible danger, the experiment is started and the black hole created. However, the experiment goes awry and the black hole destroys the accelerator and claims the life of Dr. Soderstrom, as well as the lives of other personnel present in the control room.

Eight years later, his daughter Dr. Eva Soderstrom discovers that Dr. Abernathy has built a new accelerator and so she wants to prove he was responsible for the death of her father. She approaches professor Steven Price who works for Filadyne who could provide her with the data about the company activities. After she learns that Dr. Abernathy plans a new experiment, whose consequences are underestimated because of erroneous calculation, she is determined to stop him. Despite her best efforts, the experiment is started and again goes out of control and the black hole threatens to either suck in the whole planet or cause very devastating explosion. The majority of personnel escapes thanks to the actions of Dr. Soderstrom while Dr. Abernathy is sucked into the black hole. The AEC prepares the report and classifies all information about the experiment.

== Cast ==
- Amanda Tapping as Professor Eva Soderstrom
- Adrian Paul as Professor Steven Price
- Malcolm McDowell as Dr. Thomas Abernathy
- Andrew McIlroy as Oscar
- Kirsten Robek as Christine Marshall
- Michael Rivkin as Dr. Jason Lazarus

== Reception ==
The film was called a "low-budget, direct-to-video clunker" and judged ’"amazingly boring". TV guide stated, "Bracketed by fairly successful but brief action set pieces, the film isn't quite the disaster epic the box art would like you to believe. It's basically a breezy sci-fi procedural, with Eva and Price running from Abernathy's henchmen while looking for high-tech ways to throw a wrench in the works.". A review at Moira reviews wrote, "The rest of the film is dominated by a tired bunch of conspiracy/evil corporation thriller clichés – it is for example, 75 minutes into The Void‘s 92 minute running time before the black hole even makes an appearance. And after it does, all that we get is just another Frankenstein science film – Malcolm McDowell proves to be yet another one-dimensional mad scientist;"
