= Ellen Pompeo =

American actress (born 1969)

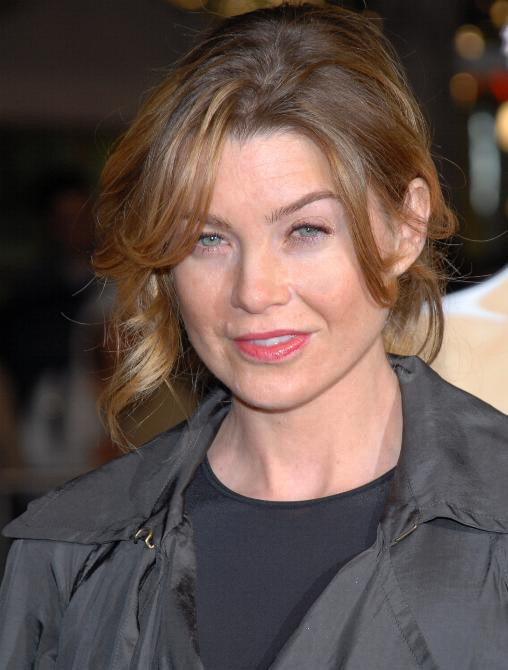
- Pompeo in 2008
- Born: Ellen Kathleen Pompeo; November 10, 1969 (age 57); Everett, Massachusetts, U.S.
- Occupations: Actress; producer
- Years active: 1995–present
- Spouse: Chris Ivery (m. 2007)
- Children: 3

Ellen Kathleen Pompeo (/pɒmˈpeɪoʊ/; born November 10, 1969) is an American actress. She is best known for playing Dr. Meredith Grey, the title character on the ABC medical drama television series Grey's Anatomy, for over two decades. Her accolades include a Screen Actors Guild Award and a Golden Globe Award nomination.

Born in Everett, Massachusetts, Pompeo moved to Miami and then New York City, where a casting director discovered her and signed her for an ad campaign for L'Oreal. She made her screen debut with NBC's legal drama Law & Order, then guest-starred in television shows including the comedy Strangers with Candy, the medical drama Strong Medicine and the sitcom Friends. She made her feature film debut in 1999 with the romantic comedy Coming Soon, and played minor roles in films like In the Weeds and Mambo Café but found little initial success. A turning point came in her career in 2002, when she was noticed for her role in Brad Silberling's romantic drama Moonlight Mile.

Pompeo was then cast in ABC's Grey's Anatomy, and gained worldwide recognition as Dr. Meredith Grey for which she won a Screen Actors Guild Award. Grey became widely popular, making Pompeo one of the most renowned television actresses. In 2016, she was ranked fourth in the list of highest paid TV actresses by Forbes, with earnings of $14.9 million; she became the third highest-paid female and the fifth highest-paid actor overall in 2018 with earnings of $23.6 million. She was also the highest-ranked actress from a drama series on the list.

Pompeo's other film roles include the comedy Old School (2003), the superhero film Daredevil (2003), the caper film Art Heist (2004), and the comedy drama Life of the Party (2005). In addition to her acting career, she has directed two episodes of Grey's Anatomy and founded a production company, Calamity Jane. She has been married to music producer Chris Ivery since 2007; they have three children.

== Early life ==
Pompeo was born in Everett, Massachusetts, on November 10, 1969. Her father was from Gesualdo, Italy and was of Italian, English, and Irish descent; and her mother of Irish ancestry. She was raised as a Catholic. Her mother died of an accidental painkiller overdose when she was four. Her father remarried soon after; he died on September 1, 2012. In 2006, Pompeo said, "I think having my mother die at such a very young age—when she was 39—[made me] appreciate life so much." She has five older siblings: three sisters and two brothers. She was nicknamed "the pencil", and "stracciatella" (gelato flavor). She worked as a bartender in Miami when she started dating her then boyfriend. They moved to New York City in 1995, where she was approached by a casting director to appear in ads for Citibank and L'Oreal.

== Career ==
=== 1995–2004: Career beginnings ===
Pompeo's early work included advertisements and small independent films. She made her television debut in 1996 by guest-starring in the NBC legal police drama Law & Order. She made her feature film debut in Coming Soon (1999), playing a small part. She made her second appearance in Law & Order in 2000, and then guest-starred on Strangers with Candy, Strong Medicine, and Friends. She then moved to Los Angeles in 2001. She participated in the film Mambo Café with Thalía.

In 2002, Pompeo was selected by director Brad Silberling for a lead role in his film Moonlight Mile, playing Jake Gyllenhaal's character's sympathetic love interest. While generally praising the cast, Jeff Vice of Deseret News noted Pompeo's "extremely appealing" performance. Other commentators considered her performance to be worthy of an Academy Award. Also in 2002, Pompeo appeared in the biographical crime drama film Catch Me If You Can; and in 2003, she appeared in Old School as Luke Wilson's love interest. She portrayed Jim Carrey's ex-girlfriend, Naomi, in the 2004 film Eternal Sunshine of the Spotless Mind. Although the scenes in which she appeared were cut from the film, she felt grateful that she had been selected by director Michel Gondry. She played the role of Karen Page in the 2003 film Daredevil and the next year she starred in Art Heist.

=== 2005–2010: Grey's Anatomy and other works ===
Pompeo landed her first major role in 2005 on the ABC medical drama series Grey's Anatomy, created by Shonda Rhimes. She has played the title character and series' protagonist, Meredith Grey, a surgical intern at the fictional Seattle Grace Hospital since the show's pilot episode. Grey's Anatomy was a breakout hit in 2005 and was well received by television critics.

When the show began, Pompeo received positive feedback for her performance, with Newsday's Diane Werts writing, "star Ellen Pompeo's newly-minted Dr. Grey conveys such substance that you simply can't stop watching."

Pompeo signed a new contract for Grey's Anatomy in 2011 that increased her salary to US$200,000 per episode; she was subsequently named the eighth highest-paid TV actress in 2012, earning $9 million. The contract would have her involved with the show until its 12th season. Under her renewed deal of 2013, she earned $350,000 per episode, with additional payment from syndication. At that point, she was ranked fourth in the list of highest-paid television actresses again in 2015, in the Forbes list, with the earnings of $11.5 million. Pompeo's contract with the company expired again at the end of the 12th season along with the other original cast members, and she signed a new one with an increased paycheck. She held on the fourth spot in Forbes' list in 2016, bringing in $14 million, a 32% increase in the earnings from 2015.

With the increasing popularity of the show, Pompeo garnered worldwide reputation among television viewers. Her performance has garnered her five People's Choice Award nominations, with three wins. At the 37th People's Choice Awards, she was nominated against Dempsey and Oh in the Favorite TV Doctor category and the next year, she received a nomination in the Favorite TV Drama Actress category, an award that she has won thrice at the 39th, 41st, and the 42nd People's Choice Awards. Pompeo has been nominated for several other awards for her performances in the show. She and the Grey's Anatomy cast won Best Ensemble in a Television Series at the 2006 Satellite Awards. During the following year's ceremony, she was named Best Actress in a Television Drama Series. She was among the Grey's Anatomy cast members awarded the award for Outstanding Performance by an Ensemble in a Drama Series at the 13th Screen Actors Guild Awards, and received nominations in the same category in 2006 and 2008. Pompeo received a nomination for Best Performance by an Actress in a Drama Series at the 64th Golden Globe Awards – the program won Best Drama Series at the same ceremony. In 2007, Pompeo and the female cast and crew of Grey's Anatomy received the Women in Film Lucy Award, which honors those "whose work in television has positively influenced attitudes toward women." The same year, she starred in Life of the Party.

In 2007, Pompeo was honored by the National Italian American Foundation for her achievement in entertainment at a black-tie gala in Washington, D.C. In the same year, show-business awards reporter Tom O'Neil commented that Pompeo was overdue for an Emmy Award nomination for her role in Grey's Anatomy. The view was echoed by later critics, including Mary McNamara of the Los Angeles Times who suggested that Pompeo, "who has worked very hard and against all narrative odds to make Meredith Grey an interesting character at last" should have received a nomination at the 61st Primetime Emmy Awards. During the twelfth season of the show, Western Gazette's Alex Hawnkings gave Pompeo credit for carrying the show and re-iterated it was time for her to finally win an Emmy Award. Readers of O'Neil's awards website, The Envelope, included Pompeo in their 2009 nominations for Best Drama Actress in the site's Gold Derby TV Awards.

=== 2011–present: Professional expansion ===
On October 27, 2011, Deadline Hollywood reported that Pompeo had launched her own production company called Calamity Jane which sold its first project to ABC, an untitled show about female agents on the Secretary of State's security detail. During a 2014 BuzzFeed event, she expressed a lack of interest in acting after Grey's Anatomy completes its run; she explained: "I definitely feel myself transitioning. I don't find acting terribly empowering." Since then, Pompeo has been involved in other projects as a producer and had also made her directorial debut with a Grey's Anatomy episode, from the thirteenth season. In August 2014, it was announced that Pompeo was developing two dramas with ABC Studios - an adaptation of Rachel Carey's 2013 novel Debt for ABC Family, and an untitled female police drama for ABC. Pompeo is also involved with a Spanish thriller Motivos Personales with the London-based company, New Media Vision. Pompeo appeared in the music video for Taylor Swift's 2015 single "Bad Blood", and two years later, she voiced a stuffed animal cat in Doc McStuffins.

In January 2018, she renewed her contract for Grey's Anatomy, agreeing for two more seasons; she became the highest-paid actress in a television drama series, earning more than $20 million a year with the new deal. She received a sum of $575,000 per episode under her new contract and was promoted to the rank of producer for the series, which was estimated to earn her a separate $6 million to $7 million annually. She was also listed as co-producer for the Grey's Anatomy spinoff titled Station 19 and received office space for Calamity Jane at Walt Disney Studios. She wrote a piece on the issue of the gender pay gap and her new contract with ABC, which was featured as the cover story for the January 2018 issue of The Hollywood Reporter. Forbes ranked Pompeo as the third highest female and the fifth highest actor overall on its 2018 list of highest paid TV actors on television; she had estimated earnings of US$23.5 million.

In 2019, she appeared as a guest judge on the fourth season of RuPaul's Drag Race All Stars. More recently, her production company and ABC bought out the rights to the Paradise book trilogy.

After starring full time in the medical series drama Grey's Anatomy since the show's premiere in 2005, season 19 of the show marked the first time the star had a scaled back role on the television series. Pompeo was only scheduled to appear in eight episodes during that season. Pompeo will remain an executive producer on the show and continue her signature voiceovers for the show.

==== Denzel Washington incident ====
In 2021, Pompeo told Patrick Dempsey on her podcast Tell Me with Ellen Pompeo that she remembered having an intense fight with actor Denzel Washington. Washington directed Pompeo in the 2016 Grey's Anatomy episode "The Sound of Silence". During filming, Washington took issue with Pompeo improvising dialogue to which she said "listen motherfucker, this is my show. This is my set. Who are you telling? You barely know where the bathroom is." She added that while things calmed down, "[Washington] doesn't know shit about directing TV." The story went viral and was heavily publicized with many accusing Pompeo of being disrespectful to Washington.

== Personal life ==
Pompeo met Chris Ivery in a Los Angeles grocery store in 2003. They began dating after six months of friendship and got married in 2007, with New York City mayor Michael Bloomberg as the legal witness to the ceremony. They have two daughters and a son.

Pompeo criticized media reports suggesting that she suffered from an eating disorder, calling the media irresponsible for promoting such rumors. In Los Angeles Confidential Magazine in 2007, she said that she was worried about the young girls who look up to her: "I don't want them to think I starve myself or don't eat, and that to be like me that's what they have to do."

Pompeo, along with Shonda Rhimes and the leads of Rhimes' ABC Thursday line-up shows, Scandal's Kerry Washington and How to Get Away With Murder's Viola Davis, appeared in an ad campaign for the 2016 US election supporting Hillary Clinton, comparing her to the protagonists of those series. In the video, the actresses note that Olivia Pope, Annalise Keating, and Meredith Grey are "brilliant" and "complex" women who fight for justice and give voice to the voiceless. Rhimes, Davis, Pompeo, and Washington each take turns speaking as they praise the presidential candidate and conclude: "Our characters are on television; the real world has Hillary Clinton." Clinton responded to the video with a tweet, "Talk about a power lineup. Thank you for being on this team!"

== Filmography ==
=== Film ===
Year	Title	Role	Notes
1995	Do You Have the Time	Woman	Short film
1999	8 ½ x 11	Human Resources Woman	Short film
1999	Coming Soon	Upset Girl	
2000	Eventual Wife	Beth	Short film
2000	In the Weeds	Martha	
2000	Mambo Café	Stacy	
2002	Moonlight Mile	Bertie Knox	
2002	Catch Me If You Can	Marci	
2003	Old School	Nicole	
2003	Daredevil	Karen Page	
2003	Undermind	Flynn	
2004	Nobody's Perfect	Veronica	Short film
2004	Art Heist	Sandra Walker	
2004	Eternal Sunshine of the Spotless Mind	Naomi	Scenes deleted
2005	Life of the Party	Phoebe Elgin	

=== Television ===
Year	Title	Role	Notes
1996, 2000	Law & Order	Jenna Weber	Episode: "Savior"
1996, 2000	Law & Order	Laura Kendrick	Episode: "Fools for Love"
1999	Strangers with Candy	Lizzie Abrams	Episode: "Feather in the Storm"
2000	Get Real	Nina Adler	Episode: "History Lessons"
2001	The Job	Sue	Episode: "Anger"
2001	Strong Medicine	Quincy Dunne	Episode: "Wednesday Night Fever"
2004	Friends	Missy Goldberg	Episode: "The One Where the Stripper Cries"
2005–present	Grey's Anatomy	Dr. Meredith Grey	Lead role and Narrator (seasons 1–22); 466 episodes; 38 episodes voice only, also Executive Producer and Director
2010	Sesame Street	Herself	Episode: "Veggies Revolt"
2015	Repeat After Me	Herself	Episode: "Episode 108"
2017	Doc McStuffins	Willow	Voice, episode: "Willow's Wonky Whiskers"
2018–2023	Station 19	Dr. Meredith Grey	Special Guest (3 episodes)
2019	RuPaul's Drag Race: All Stars	Herself	Guest judge (season 4)
2021	Martha Gets Down and Dirty	Herself	Episode: "Flower Power"
2025	Good American Family	Kristine Barnett	Main role, 8 episodes; also executive producer

=== Music videos ===
Year	Title	Artist	Role	Ref.
2015	"Bad Blood"	Taylor Swift	Luna	

=== As director ===
Year	Title	Role	Notes	Ref.
2017–2018	Grey's Anatomy	Director	2 episodes: "Be Still, My Soul" and "Old Scars, Future Hearts"	

=== As producer ===
Year	Title	Role	Notes
2017–present	Grey's Anatomy	Executive producer	
2018–2024	Station 19	Co-executive producer	7 seasons
2025	Good American Family	Executive producer	Miniseries

== Awards and nominations ==
Year	Association	Category	Work	Result	Ref.
2005	Teen Choice Awards	Choice TV – Breakout Female	Grey's Anatomy	Nominated	
2006	Screen Actors Guild Awards	Outstanding Performance by an Ensemble in a Drama Series	Grey's Anatomy	Nominated	
2006	Teen Choice Awards	Choice TV Actress	Grey's Anatomy	Nominated	
2006	Satellite Awards	Best Ensemble in Television	Grey's Anatomy	Won	
2007	Golden Globe Awards	Best Performance by an Actress in a Television Series – Drama	Grey's Anatomy	Nominated	
2007	Screen Actors Guild Awards	Outstanding Performance by an Ensemble in a Drama Series	Grey's Anatomy	Won	
2007	Satellite Awards	Best Actress – Drama Series	Grey's Anatomy	Won	
2007	National Italian American Foundation	Special Achievement in Entertaining	Herself	Won	
2008	Screen Actors Guild Awards	Outstanding Performance by an Ensemble in a Drama Series	Grey's Anatomy	Nominated	
2011	People's Choice Awards	Favorite TV Doctor	Grey's Anatomy	Nominated	
2012	People's Choice Awards	Favorite TV Drama Actress	Grey's Anatomy	Nominated	
2013	People's Choice Awards	Favorite TV Drama Actress	Grey's Anatomy	Won	
2015	People's Choice Awards	Favorite Dramatic TV Actress	Grey's Anatomy	Won	
2015	Taormina Film Fest	Taormina Arte Award	Herself	Won	
2016	People's Choice Awards	Favorite Dramatic TV Actress	Grey's Anatomy	Won	
2017	People's Choice Awards	Favorite Dramatic TV Actress	Grey's Anatomy	Nominated	
2017	MTV Movie & TV Awards	Tearjerker	Grey's Anatomy	Nominated	
2018	People's Choice Awards	The Female TV Star of 2018	Grey's Anatomy	Nominated	
2018	GLSEN Respect Awards	LGBTQ Community's Supporter	Herself	Won	
2020	People's Choice Awards	The Female TV Star of 2020	Grey's Anatomy	Won	
2020	People's Choice Awards	The Drama Star of 2020	Grey's Anatomy	Nominated	
2021	People's Choice Awards	The Female TV Star of 2021	Grey's Anatomy	Won	
2021	People's Choice Awards	The Drama TV Star of 2021	Grey's Anatomy	Nominated	
2022	Disney Legends Award	Honored as a Disney Legend for her "extraordinary contribution to the Disney legacy"	Herself	Honoree	
2022	People's Choice Awards	The Female TV Star of 2022	Grey's Anatomy	Won	
2022	People's Choice Awards	The Drama TV Star of 2022	Grey's Anatomy	Nominated	
2025	Hollywood Chamber of Commerce	Hollywood Walk of Fame 6533 Blvd	Herself	Honoree	
