= Magic Man (film) =

2010 American film

- Directed by: Stuart Cooper (as Roscoe Lever)
- Written by: Brent Huff; George Saunders; Michael S. Feinstein
- Produced by: Gregory Raskin; Alexander Nevsky; Kelly Korzon
- Starring: Billy Zane; Alexander Nevsky; Bai Ling; Robert Davi; Armand Assante
- Music by: The Newton Brothers
- Release date: September 21, 2010
- Running time: 90 minutes
- Country: United States
- Language: English

Magic Man is a 2010 thriller film directed by Stuart Cooper and starring Billy Zane and Alexander Nevsky.

== Cast ==
- Billy Zane as Darius
- Alexander Nevsky as Detective Orloff
- Robert Davi as Simpson
- Bai Ling as Samantha
- Armand Assante as Lieutenant Taper
- Estelle Raskin as Tatiana
  - Veronica Powers as Young Tatiana
- Christina Vidal as Elena, The First Victim
- Andrew Divoff as Rudolph Treadwell
- Sarah Jayne Jensen as Vera
- Richard Tyson as Detective Rogers
- Brandon Molale as Darryl
