= Eion Bailey =

American actor (born 1976)

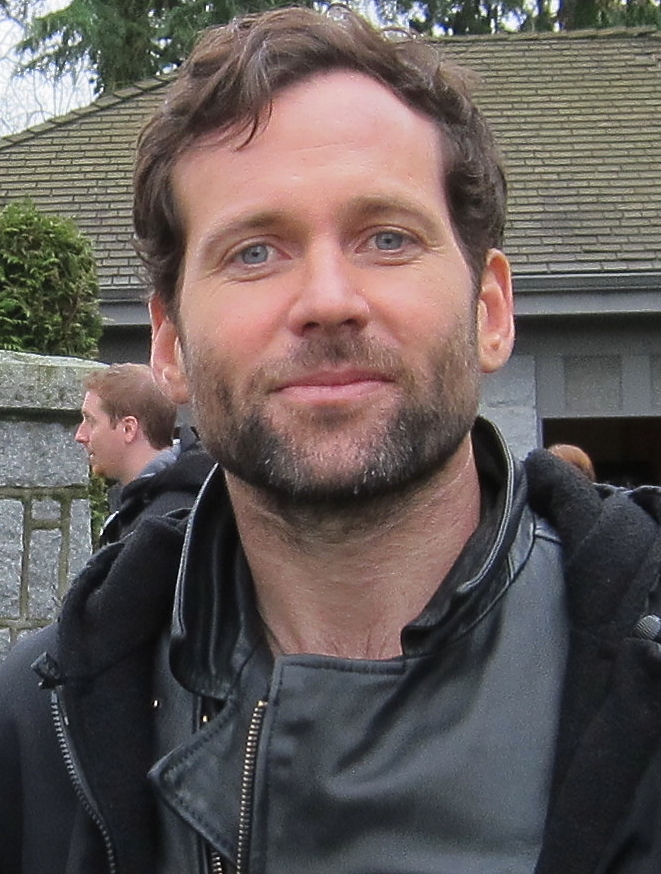
- Bailey in 2012
- Born: Eion Francis Hamilton Bailey; June 8, 1976 (age 50); Santa Monica, California, U.S.
- Education: American Academy of Dramatic Arts
- Occupation: Actor
- Years active: 1997–present
- Spouse: Weyni Mengesha (m. 2011)
- Children: 2

Eion Francis Hamilton Bailey (/ˈiːɒn/ EE-on; born June 8, 1976) is an American actor.

He starred as Jim Matthews in the MGM+ horror series From. He played Pvt. David Kenyon Webster in the HBO miniseries Band of Brothers and appeared in the films Fight Club, Center Stage, Mindhunters, and Sexual Life. He had a recurring role on the USA Network TV series Covert Affairs and played August (Pinocchio) in the ABC TV series Once Upon a Time. He also had a recurring role as Ray, a psychopathic killer in the CBS series Stalker. He played Teddy Weizak in the 2020 limited series The Stand.

== Career ==
Bailey struggled in school until he found his calling in his high school's drama department. He was soon performing in each school play and went on to study formally at the American Academy of Dramatic Arts in New York City. He briefly attended Santa Barbara City College. He appeared in Almost Famous, portraying Jann Wenner. He was seen in Center Stage, Fight Club, Catherine Jelski's The Young Unknowns, The Scoundrel's Wife, Seven and a Match, Renny Harlin's Mindhunters for Miramax, and the independent feature Sexual Life for director Ken Kwapis. He auditioned for the role of Bruce Wayne in Batman Begins (2005).

His television appearances include Dawson's Creek, HBO's highly acclaimed series Band of Brothers produced by Tom Hanks and Steven Spielberg, and the HBO original film And Starring Pancho Villa as Himself opposite Antonio Banderas.

Onstage, Bailey appeared in Equus at the Pasadena Playhouse, as well as Spoon River Anthology, Look Homeward, Angel, and Dinner at Eight at the American Academy of Dramatic Arts, Desire and I at the Access Theatre Santa Barbara, and Icarus' Mother at the SBCC Studio Theatre.

In 2007, Bailey was awarded a Daytime Emmy for his performance in Life of the Party. Bailey had recurring guest-starring roles on the TV series Dawson's Creek and ER.

In 2010, Bailey had a recurring role in USA Network's Covert Affairs as Ben Mercer, Annie's ex-boyfriend, who was being targeted by the CIA, before returning to the Agency near the end of Season 1. Bailey had a guest role on 30 Rock in 2011 as Anders, a love interest of Liz Lemon's who is "definitely not a Swiss prostitute that Martha Stewart recommended." In 2012, Bailey started recurring on Once Upon a Time as August Booth.

On May 1, 2013, Bailey guest-starred in "Traumatic Wound" on Law & Order: Special Victims Unit as Frank Patterson, an Iraq war veteran with PTSD who becomes a key witness in an investigation of a sexual assault in a nightclub.

== Filmography ==
=== Film ===
Year	Title	Role	Notes
1997	A Better Place	Ryan	
1999	Fight Club	Ricky	
2000	The Young Unknowns	Joe	
2000	Center Stage	Jim Gordon	
2000	Almost Famous	Jann Wenner	
2002	The Scoundrel's Wife	Ensign Jack Burwell	
2003	Seven and a Match	Sid	
2003	And Starring Pancho Villa as Himself	Frank N. Thayer	
2004	Mindhunters	Bobby Whitman	
2005	Life of the Party	Michael	Won – Daytime Emmy award for Outstanding Performer in a Children/Youth/Family Special
2005	Sexual Life	David	
2008	A House Divided	Romi Meir	a.k.a. Language of the Enemy
2009	The Canyon	Nick	
2009	(Untitled)	Josh	
2017	Extortion	Kevin Riley	

=== Television ===
Year	Title	Role	Notes
1997	Buffy the Vampire Slayer	Kyle DuFours	Episode: "The Pack"
1998	Significant Others	Cambell Chasen	Main role
1998	Dawson's Creek	Billy Konrad	Episodes: "Boyfriend", "Road Trip"
2001	Band of Brothers	Pvt. David Kenyon Webster	Miniseries
2003	And Starring Pancho Villa as Himself	Frank Thayer	Television film
2003	Without a Trace	Christopher Mayes	Episode: "Confidence"
2005	ER	Jake Scanlon	Recurring role (season 11)
2005	CSI: NY	Dean Lessing	Episode: "Charge of This Post"
2006	Nightmares and Dreamscapes	Lonnie Freeman	Episode: "Crouch End"
2006	Orpheus	N/A	TV film
2006	Candles on Bay Street	Sam Timmons	TV film
2009	Cold Case	Patrick 'The Rifle' Lennox	Episode: "November 22"
2009	Numb3rs	Cam	Episode: "Cover Me"
2010	Dirty Little Secret	Jack (voice)	Web series; main role
2010–11	Covert Affairs	Ben Mercer	Recurring role (seasons 1–2)
2011	30 Rock	Anders	Episode: "It's Never Too Late for Now"
2011	Law & Order: Criminal Intent	Adam Winter	Episode: "Icarus"
2012–17	Once Upon a Time	August Wayne Booth / Pinocchio	15 episodes
2013	Law & Order: Special Victims Unit	Frank Patterson	Episode: "Traumatic Wound"
2014	Ray Donovan	Steve Knight	Recurring role (season 2); 5 episodes
2015	Stalker	Ray	Recurring role; 6 episodes
2016	Who Killed JonBenet	Detective Steve Thomas	TV film
2017	Switched for Christmas	Tom Kinder	TV film
2017	The Last Tycoon	Clint	Miniseries; 3 episodes
2018	FBI	Senator Gary Lynch	Episode: "Family Man"
2020	The Stand	Teddy Weizak	Miniseries
2020	Emily in Paris	Randy Zimmer	Episode: "A Kiss Is Just A Kiss"
2020	Deliver by Christmas	Josh	TV film
2022–2026	From	Jim Matthews	Main role

== Personal life ==
Bailey married Weyni Mengesha, a Canadian theatre director, in 2011. The couple has two children.
