= Sexual Life =

2004 film by Ken Kwapis

- Film poster
- Directed by: Ken Kwapis
- Written by: Ken Kwapis
- Produced by: Ken Aguado
- Starring: Eion Bailey; Elizabeth Banks; Carla Gallo; Dulé Hill; James LeGros; Tom Everett Scott; Azura Skye; Kerry Washington; Anne Heche
- Cinematography: Edward J. Pei
- Edited by: Kathryn Himoff
- Music by: Cliff Eidelman
- Distributed by: Showtime Independent Films
- Release date: June 19, 2004 (Los Angeles Film Festival)
- Running time: 96 minutes
- Country: United States
- Language: English

Sexual Life is a 2004 American comedy-drama film written and directed by Ken Kwapis, produced by Ken Aguado, and distributed by Showtime Independent Films. The ensemble cast includes Azura Skye, Carla Gallo, Anne Heche, Elizabeth Banks, Tom Everett Scott, and Kerry Washington.

It is adapted from Arthur Schnitzler's 1897 play La Ronde.

== Premise ==
Like La Ronde, Sexual Life has an unconventional narrative structure, identified by Charles Ramírez Berg as the "daisy chain plot", in which there is not a single protagonist, but instead one central character links to another.

== Cast ==
- Eion Bailey as David
- Elizabeth Banks as Sarah
- Carla Gallo as Terri
- Dulé Hill as Jerry
- James LeGros as Josh
- Tom Everett Scott as Todd
- Azura Skye as Lorna
- Kerry Washington as Rosalie
- Anne Heche as Gwen
- Kevin Corrigan as Phil
- Shirley Knight as Joanne
- Steven Weber as David Wharton

== Reception and awards ==
Variety found its portrayal of the subject matter to be limited, writing, "this semi-comedy of manners and hormones suffers from being much too neat and tidy, aesthetically and dramatically sweeping aside a lot of the messiness that comes with sex."

The film won the Copper Wing Award for best director at Phoenix Film Festival.
