= Extortion (2017 film) =

- DVD cover
- Directed by: Phil Volken
- Written by: Phil Volken
- Produced by: Phil Volken; Alina Shraybman
- Starring: Eion Bailey; Bethany Joy Lenz; Barkhad Abdi; Danny Glover
- Edited by: Phil Volken
- Music by: Gad Emile Zeitune
- Production companies: Del Rey Productions; 13 Films; Producer Capital Fund
- Distributed by: Lionsgate
- Release date: May 16, 2017
- Running time: 109 minutes
- Country: United States
- Language: English

Extortion, is a 2017 American thriller film, starring Eion Bailey, Bethany Joy Lenz, Barkhad Abdi, and Danny Glover.

== Synopsis ==
Kevin Riley and his family get stuck on a deserted island. A fisherman named Miguel Kaba finds them and asks for one million dollars in exchange for the survival of his family. Riley says he doesn't have that amount of money, so Kaba captures Riley and forces him to try to get the one million dollars however he can.

Riley is able to get the money by calling in favours from some of his friends, but when Kaba is taking him back to the island, he traps Riley in a cabin and sinks the boat before catching a lift with an accomplice. Riley is able to escape and is rescued by a passing tourist ship, but is unable to convince the local police of his story, as he cannot provide verifiable names and the evidence could equally suggest that he paid someone off to help him get rid of his wife and son. Recalling a distinctive wound on Kaba’s arm after seeing someone with a similar scar, Riley is able to find the doctor who treated the injury and convince her to help him find Kaba. Unfortunately, when he finds Kaba’s house and boat details, the situation escalates into a stand-off where Riley tries to take Kaba’s child hostage and the child is killed with a harpoon gun, forcing Riley to slit Kaba’s throat in self-defense.

Riley is taken into custody in the hospital, with Constable Haagen now certain that his story of his lost family was faked, but Riley is able to escape. While his own investigative efforts failed, Riley finds Kaba’s accomplice on a bus by chance, but although the other man is hit by a truck, he remains conscious long enough to indicate the island where Kaba abandoned his family. Running to a nearby marina, Riley is able to steal a boat and get back to the island, where he finds his wife and son still alive, albeit weak. He gets his son back to the boat, but it drifts off while he is trying to get his wife to safety, and he collapses from his injuries. However, a police helicopter pursuing his stolen boat comes into land and his eyes open, suggesting that Riley’s family will survive.

== Cast ==
- Eion Bailey as Kevin Riley
- Bethany Joy Lenz as Julie Riley
- Barkhad Abdi as Miguel Kaba
- Danny Glover as Constable Haagen
- Mauricio Alemañy as Andy Riley
- Tim Griffin as Chief of Mission Sweeney

== Production ==
Early in development, Frank Grillo, Ving Rhames, Jake McLaughlin and Nicky Whalen were initially cast in the film.

In June 2016, the film entered the final stages of post-production.

== See also ==
- Extortion
