= Amelia Heinle =

American actress (born 1973)

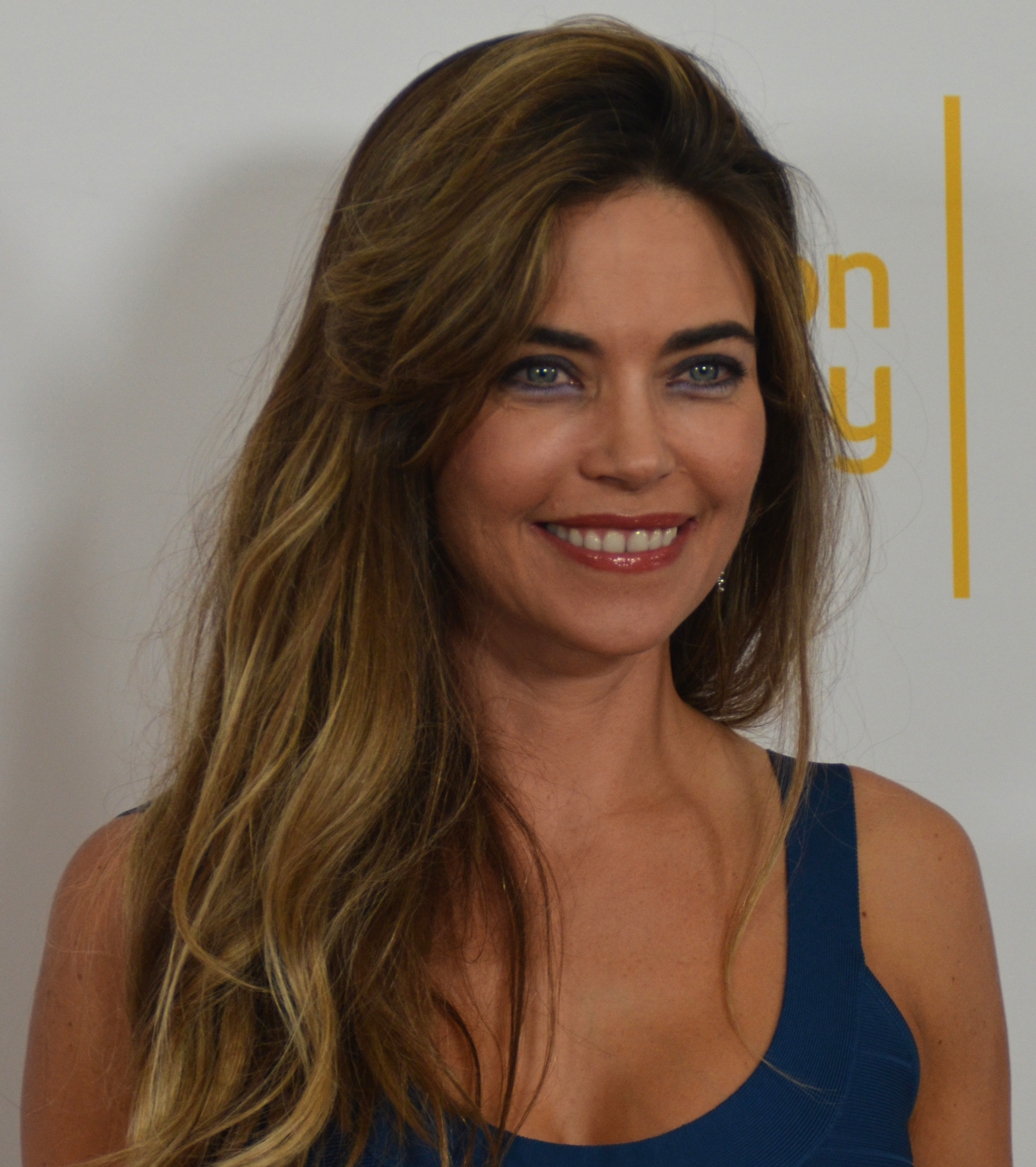
- Heinle in 2014
- Born: Amelia March Heinle; March 17, 1973 (age 53); Phoenix, Arizona, U.S.
- Other name: Amelia Weatherly
- Occupation: Actress
- Years active: 1993–present
- Spouse(s): Michael Weatherly (m. 1995; div. 1997) Thad Luckinbill (m. 2007)
- Children: 3

Amelia March Luckinbill (née: Heinle; formerly Weatherly; born March 17, 1973) is an American actress known for her roles in American soap operas. Her best known role is Victoria Newman, who she has portrayed on The Young and the Restless since 2005.

== Early life ==
Heinle grew up in Arizona and moved to New Jersey with her family when she was 15 years old.

== Career ==
From 1993 to 1995, she played the role of Stephanie "Steffi" Brewster on the soap opera Loving. She also played the character in that show's short-lived spin off, The City from November 1995 until January 1996. In 1994, she was nominated for a Soap Opera Digest Award for Outstanding Female Newcomer.

Through the 1990s, she appeared in many made-for-TV movies, and a role in the 1999 Steven Soderbergh film The Limey (as Peter Fonda's girlfriend). She appeared in the music video for "I Will Buy You a New Life" by Everclear.

In 2000, Heinle played the part of Harriet Hemings in Sally Hemings: An American Scandal, a short, two-part, made-for-television film.

In 2001, she returned to daytime television, this time in the role of Mia Saunders on All My Children, the heretofore unknown half-sister of Liza Colby (Marcy Walker). Although she started as a front-burner character, her romantic pairing with Jake Martin (J. Eddie Peck) did not work out because of the actor's exit from the show, with Mia relegated to a background character. In 2004, Heinle opted not to renew her contract with All My Children and left the show.

On March 21, 2005, Heinle joined the cast of the CBS soap opera The Young and the Restless, as Victoria Newman, replacing the popular Heather Tom in the role. She won a Daytime Emmy Award for Outstanding Supporting Actress in a Drama Series in 2014 and again in 2015 for the role.

In April 2009, Heinle appeared in season four, episode 20, of Ghost Whisperer, entitled "Stage Fright", with husband Thad Luckinbill and fellow daytime drama actress Lesli Kay.

== Personal life ==
In February 1995, Heinle married her Loving/The City co-star Michael Weatherly. Their son was born in 1996. The couple divorced in 1997.

In March 2007, she married her Young and the Restless co-star, Thad Luckinbill, notable for portraying her onscreen ex-husband, J.T. Hellstrom. Their first child together, a son, was born on November 2, 2007. Their second child, a daughter, was born on December 17, 2009.

== Filmography ==
=== Film ===
Year	Title	Role	Notes
1998	At Sachem Farm	Laurie	
1999	Liar's Poker	Rebecca	
1999	The Limey	Adhara	
2003	Another Night	Woman	Short

=== Television ===
Year	Title	Role	Notes
1993–1995	Loving	Stephanie Brewster	TV series
1995–96	The City	Stephanie Brewster	TV series
1997	Quicksilver Highway	Darlene	TV film
1998	Black Cat Run	Sara Jane Brownell	TV film
1999	Purgatory	Rose / Betty McCullough	TV film
1999	Jack & Jill	Jacqueline 'Jack' Barrett	Unaired pilot, replaced by Amanda Peet
2000	Sally Hemings: An American Scandal	Harriet Hemings	TV film
2000	The Only Living Boy in New York	Olivia	TV film
2001	Earth vs. the Spider	Stephanie Lewis	TV film
2001–2004	All My Children	Mia Saunders	TV series
2005–present	The Young and the Restless	Victoria Newman	Regular role
2009	CSI: Miami	Elizabeth Corbett	"Chip/Tuck"
2009	Ghost Whisperer	Prof. Brook Dennis	"Stage Fright"

== Awards and nominations ==
List of acting awards and nominations
Year	Award	Category	Title	Result	Ref.
2014	Daytime Emmy Award	Outstanding Supporting Actress in a Drama Series	The Young and the Restless	Won	
2015	Daytime Emmy Award	Outstanding Supporting Actress in a Drama Series	The Young and the Restless	Won	
2019	Soap Awards France	Best International Actor / Actress	The Young and the Restless	Nominated	

Preceded by Heather Tom	Victoria Newman (role); 2005–present	Incumbent
