= Storm Watch =

- Directed by: Terry Cunningham
- Written by: Terry Cunningham
- Story by: Steve Latshaw
- Produced by: Neil Elman; Lisa M. Hansen; Paul Hertzberg; Hans Ritter
- Starring: Nick Cornish; Adrian Paul; Bai Ling; Vanessa Marcil
- Cinematography: Jacques Haitkin
- Edited by: Dan Duncan; Daniel Duncan
- Music by: Sean Murray
- Production company: CineTel Films
- Release date: May 1, 2002
- Country: United States
- Language: English

Storm Watch is a 2002 American science fiction film, directed by Terry Cunningham and starring Nick Cornish, Adrian Paul, Bai Ling and Vanessa Marcil. The music was composed by Sean Murray. The film centers on a protagonist who plays a virtual reality online game, which suddenly turns into a race against time to stop a weather satellite from destroying the world. The film was released on DVD and VHS under the title Code Hunter.

Storm Watch features special effect scenes reused from the films Virus, End of Days, and Set It Off. Clips from Virus include the alien energy hitting the Russian ship (in Storm Watch, it is lightning hitting a decommissioned ship the Army uses for a target); and the "Sea Star" tug boat caught in the storm (shot to be a natural storm, in this film it is artificial). The entire subway train miniature exteriors are from End of Days. The Chevrolet Impala car chase was lifted from Set It Off.
