= 2006 Alabama Attorney General election =

- November 7, 2006

Candidate	Troy King	John Tyson, Jr.
Party	Republican	Democratic
Popular vote	653,045	576,830
Percentage	53.05%	46.85%
- County results King: 50–60% 60–70% 70–80% Tyson: 50–60% 60–70% 70–80%
Attorney General before election
Troy King
Republican
Elected Attorney General
Troy King
Republican

The 2006 Alabama Attorney General election was held on November 7, 2006 to elect the Alabama Attorney General. Primaries were held on June 6, 2006. Republican incumbent Troy King, who was appointed in 2004 after Bill Pryor resigned upon being appointed a United States circuit judge, won election to a full term by a margin of six percentage points over Democratic Mobile County District attorney John Tyson, Jr.

As of 2026, this is the last Alabama Attorney General election to be decided by less than 15 percentage points.

== Republican primary ==
=== Candidates ===
- Troy King, incumbent Alabama Attorney General (2004–2011)
- Mark Montiel, former judge and conservative talk show host

=== Results ===
Republican primary results
Party	Candidate	Votes	%
Republican	Troy King	294,696	74.73%
Republican	Mark Montiel	99,650	25.27%
Total votes		394,346	100.00%

== Democratic primary ==
=== Candidates ===
- John Tyson, Jr., Mobile County District attorney
- Larry Darby, attorney

=== Results ===
Democratic primary results
Party	Candidate	Votes	%
Democratic	John Tyson, Jr.	214,589	56.82%
Democratic	Larry Darby	163,067	43.18%
Total votes		377,656	100.00%

== General election ==
=== Candidates ===
- Troy King, incumbent Alabama Attorney General (2004–2011) (Republican)
- John Tyson, Jr., Mobile County District attorney (Democratic)

=== Results ===
2006 Alabama Attorney General election results
Party	Candidate	Votes	%	±%
Republican	Troy King	653,045	53.05%	−5.80%
Democratic	John Tyson, Jr.	576,830	46.85%	+8.01%
Write-in		1,221	0.10%	-0.01%
Total votes		1,231,096	100.00%	
Republican hold				
