= Sean Murray (composer) =

American composer

Sean William Murray
- Born: Santa Barbara, California, U.S.
- Genres: Film scores; video game score
- Occupations: Composer; video game composer
- Years active: 1986–present
- Website: seanmurraymusic.com

Sean Murray is an American composer who has composed for numerous films, television shows and video games, such as God, the Devil and Bob (2000), starring Alan Cumming, James Garner and French Stewart, Art Heist (2004), Buffy the Vampire Slayer (1997), True Crime: Streets of LA (2003), Call of Duty: World at War (2008), and its record-selling sequel Call of Duty: Black Ops (2010).

== Biography ==
Sean grew up in Santa Barbara, California, where he attended the Brooks Institute Film School. There he began studying film composing, by contributing music to dozens of student movies. Sean debuted as a composer when he was a teenager for the action film Scorpion.

== Discography ==
=== Films ===
==== 1990s ====
Year	Title	Notes
1986	Scorpion	
1989	One for the Road	Documentary film
1992	Dying for a Smoke	Documentary film
1993	Spree	
1995	The Crier	
1995	God of Rockabilly	
1996	Arranged Marriage	
1996	One Way Out	
1997	A Rock and a Hard Place	
1997	Critics and Other Freaks	
1997	Madam Savant	
1997	Ocean Tribe	
1997	The First to Go	
1998	Devil's Playground	
1998	The Legend of Cryin' Ryan	
1999	Treasure	
1999	The Doorman	
1999	Shogun Cop	

==== 2000s ====
Year	Title	Notes
2001	Elvis Is Alive	
2001	Red Man	Short film
2001	Firetrap	
2001	The Elite	
2002	Phase IV	
2002	Storm Watch	
2002	The Honorable	
2002	Con Express	Direct-to-video
2002	Global Effect	
2003	Purgatory Flats	
2004	Face of Terror	
2004	Art Heist	
2005	Bad Girls from Valley High	Direct-to-video
2005	Island Prey	
2005	Crusader	
2007	The Deal	
2007	Stevie	Television film
2008	Clean Break	
2008	Reflections	
2009	Kids in the Yard	Short film

==== 2010s ====
Year	Title	Notes
2010	Junkyard Dog	
2010	Kill Speed	
2011	Palominas	
2013	The Package	
2013	The Hard Ride	Pre-production
2014	Black Rose	
2016	Showdown in Manila	
2018	The Debt Collector	
2018	Accident Man	
2019	Walk. Ride. Rodeo.	

==== 2020s ====
Year	Title	Notes
2020	Dead Reckoning	
2022	White Elephant	
2023	One Ranger	

=== Television ===
Year	Title	Notes
1995–1996	The Savage Dragon	
1996–1997	Women: Stories of Passion	"Sing, Sing Me the Blues" (Season 1, Episode 10) "Blind Love" (Season 1, Episode 12) "Mind's Eyes" (Season 2, Episode 1)
1997	Treasure	Television film
1997–1998	Buffy the Vampire Slayer	Season 2
1999	Sam Churchill: Search for a Homeless Man	Television film
2000	God, the Devil and Bob	Episodes 1–5
2005	Descent	Television film
2006	Earthstorm	Television film
2007	Hidden Camera	Television film
2009	The Lost	Television film

=== Video games ===
Year	Title	Notes
2003	True Crime: Streets of LA	
2005	True Crime: New York City	
2008	Call of Duty: World at War	
2008	Call of Duty: World at War – Final Fronts	Uses music featured in Call of Duty: World at War
2010	Call of Duty: Black Ops	Also uses original themes from Call of Duty: World at War
2014	Breach & Clear	
2014	Counter Strike: Global Offensive	Added as a Music Kit

== Personal life ==
Sean is the son of actor Don Murray, who was nominated for an Academy Award in the 1956 comedy film Bus Stop. Sean also has two brothers, Christopher and Mick Murray. He lives in Hollywood Hills with his wife and daughter.
