= Tye White =

American actor

- Born: Detroit, Michigan, U.S
- Education: University of Michigan
- Occupation: Actor
- Years active: 2009–present
- Spouse: Rania Nasreen White (2018–present)
- Children: 2

Tye White is an American actor, known for his roles as Jack Fordham in the NBC series American Auto (2021–2023), the CBS series NCIS: Los Angeles (2014–2023) where he played Aiden Hanna, the CBS series Fire Country (2024–currently) where he plays Cole Rodman, as well as his role Kevin Satterlee in the Oprah Winfrey Network drama series, Greenleaf (2016–2018).

== Life and career ==
White is African American, born in Detroit, Michigan. He attended Brother Rice High School (Michigan) and studied at the University of Michigan.

His first major role was in the VH1 television film Drumline: A New Beat in 2014. He has a recurring role as Aiden Hanna, son of Sam Hanna (played by LL Cool J) in the CBS procedural series NCIS: Los Angeles and in 2016 appeared in a secondary role as Jason Simpson, O. J. Simpson's son, in the FX series The People v. O. J. Simpson: American Crime Story.

In 2015, White was cast in a series regular role in the Oprah Winfrey Network drama series Greenleaf. He plays Kevin Satterlee, Charity Greenleaf-Satterlee's (played by Deborah Joy Winans) husband. The series also stars Lynn Whitfield, Keith David, Merle Dandridge, and Kim Hawthorne. He left the series in 2018. In 2021, White was cast in the NBC comedy series American Auto opposite Ana Gasteyer.

== Filmography ==
=== Film ===
Year	Title	Role	Notes
2009	The People I've Slept With	Male Dancer	Uncredited
2010	Hopeless	James	Short film
2010	Life of the Party: Vol. II	LeBron	
2012	Bottled	Tripp	Short film
2013	The Meet	Craig	Short film
2014	Drumline: A New Beat	Armondi Mason	Television film
2015	Sleep Over	Tye	Short film

=== Television ===
Year	Title	Role	Notes
2008	The Amazing Race 13	Himself	5 episodes before being eliminated. Credited as 'Ty White'.
2011	Pretty Little Liars	Jock	Episode: "Know Your Frenemies"
2014	Mixology	Dave	Episode: "Liv & Jim"
2014	Red Band Society	Bouncer	Episode: "Get Outta My Dreams, Get Into My Car"
2014–20	NCIS: Los Angeles	Aiden Hanna	5 episodes
2016	The People v. O. J. Simpson: American Crime Story	Jason Simpson	9 episodes
2016–18	Greenleaf	Kevin Satterlee	30 episodes
2018–19	Chicago Fire	Tyler	3 episodes
2021–23	American Auto	Jack	23 episodes
2024–Present	Fire Country	Cole Rodman	16 episodes

=== Video games ===
Year	Title	Role	Notes
2020	NBA 2K21	Junior	
