= Desiree Ross =

American actress

- Born: Columbia, South Carolina, U.S.
- Occupation: Actress
- Years active: 2012–present

Desiree Ross is an American actress. She is best known for starring as Sophia Greenleaf in the Oprah Winfrey Network drama series, Greenleaf, from 2016 to 2020. She also starred alongside Dolly Parton in the Lifetime television film A Country Christmas Story in 2013.

== Life and career ==
Ross was born and grew up in Columbia, South Carolina. She is the elder of two children in her family. She began acting in short films before she was cast as lead in the Lifetime television film A Country Christmas Story opposite Dolly Parton, Mary Kay Place and Megyn Price. The following year, Ross had a recurring role as Mira in the TNT post-apocalyptic drama series Falling Skies.

In 2015, Ross was cast in a series regular role in the Oprah Winfrey Network drama series, Greenleaf. She plays Sophia Greenleaf, the daughter of series lead' Grace 'Gigi' Greenleaf (played by Merle Dandridge). The series also stars Lynn Whitfield, Keith David, and Oprah Winfrey.

== Filmography ==
Year	Title	Role	Notes
2012	Park Bench	Soccer player	Short film
2012	Crossing the River	Michaela	Short film
2013	Old Souls	Hope	Short film
2013	A Country Christmas Story	Grace Gibson	Television film
2014	Falling Skies	Mira	Recurring role, 6 episodes
2015	Chevy	Dawn	Unsold ABC pilot
2015	Secrets in the Fall	Katie	
2016–20	Greenleaf	Sophia Greenleaf	Series regular
2019	If You're Gone	Anna Redmond	
2020	The Resident	Yvette Barnes	Season 3, Episode 17 "Doll E. Wood"
2024	Gingersnap Christmas	Alesha Delacroix	
2025	All is Merry & Bright	Aria Moore	
