= List of Greenleaf episodes =

Greenleaf is an American television drama series, created by Craig Wright, which premiered June 21, 2016, on the Oprah Winfrey Network (OWN). The series follows the unscrupulous world of the Greenleaf family (Bishop James Greenleaf, his wife Lady Mae, and their once-estranged daughter Grace) with scandalous secrets and lies, and their sprawling Memphis megachurch with predominantly African-American members.

During the course of the series, 60 episodes of Greenleaf aired, between June 21, 2016, and August 11, 2020.

== Series overview ==
Season	Episodes	Originally released	
Season	Episodes	First released	Last released
1	13	June 21, 2016	August 31, 2016
2	16	March 15, 2017	September 27, 2017
3	13	August 28, 2018	November 21, 2018
4	10	September 3, 2019	November 5, 2019
5	8	June 23, 2020	August 11, 2020

== Episodes ==
=== Season 1 (2016) ===
No. overall	No. in season	Title	Directed by	Written by	Original release date	U.S. viewers (millions)
1	1	"A Time to Heal"	Clement Virgo	Craig Wright	June 21, 2016	3.04
The drama centered on a Memphis megachurch opens with the return home of estranged daughter Grace Greenleaf (Merle Dandridge) following the death of her sister, Faith. Her father, the church bishop, seems happy to see her, but other family members are less than welcoming. Complicating matters even more: she learns unsettling information about the family and her sister's death from her Aunt Mavis. End credits: "Satan, We're Gonna Tear Your Kingdom Down" by Shirley Caesar
2	2	"The Baptism"	Donna Dietch	Craig Wright	June 22, 2016	1.93
Grace decides to move home in order to pursue the person she blames for her sister's death, but working at the church proves to be more difficult than she imagined. In other events, Jacob takes on more responsibilities at the church as a result of her return; Kevin has doubts about his and Charity's plan to start a family; and the Bishop refuses a senator's inquiries into the church's finances. End credits: "Somebody Was Watching" by Pops Staples
3	3	"We Shall See Him As He Is"	Charles Stone III	Art Alamo	June 22, 2016	2.05
Grace has an uncomfortable dinner date with Noah and Isabel; Jacob and Kerissa face the deficiencies in their marriage; Kevin has an unwanted attraction; Senator Banks ups the pressure in his inquiry into the church's finances; and Grace confronts a teenage girl who was once assaulted by Mac. End credits: "Get Your House In Order" by Dottie Peoples
4	4	"Behind Closed Doors"	Clement Virgo	Mike Flynn	June 29, 2016	1.88
The mayor calls in a favor, which leaves the Bishop in a bind that could split the church; Grace is blackmailed about Faith's past; Jacob and Kerissa attend couples counseling; and Charity has difficulty keeping a secret; Later, Bishop James invites the county police department to come to the church but the Deacon Board isn't too happy. End credits: "Every Step" by Mavis Staples
5	5	"Meaningful Survival"	Charles Randolph-Wright	Erica L. Anderson	July 6, 2016	2.06
A family in the church asks for prayers; Lady Mae tries to mend fences between the Bishop and Deacon Sykes; Jacob's infidelities push Kerissa to her limit; and Kevin takes a step toward exploring his sexuality.
6	6	"Good Morning, Calvary"	Janice Cooke	Elizabeth Hunter	July 13, 2016	1.79
The Bishop appoints Grace to preach on Sunday in his absence; Jacob tries to arrange a TV deal for the church; and Kevin's flippant advice to Charity on how to hire a new music director backfires.
7	7	"One Train May Hide Another"	Rob J. Greenlea	Mando Alvarado	July 20, 2016	2.17
Mac is slated to be named "Memphis Man of the Year," but first must advise Charity about the music director; help Jacob with his TV pitch to the Bishop; and deal with paranoia about Grace's effort to bring him to justice. Also on his plate: the IRS audit; and the unwanted appearance of his and Lady Mae's father.
8	8	"The Whole Book"	Allan Kroeker	Art Alamo	July 27, 2016	1.74
Grace reaches out to Officer Nelson while also working with Noah in an effort to find evidence against Mac; Lady Mae is suspicious of Grace and Noah; Jacob presents his TV plan to the Bishop; Lady Mae pushes the Bishop to reveal a secret; and the Bishop deals with a woman who is out to destroy Calvary.
9	9	"The Broken Road"	Clement Virgo	Erica L. Anderson	August 3, 2016	2.07
Security at Calvary is debated following the church shooting of David Nelson; Charity confronts Kevin; and Mac plans to leave the country.
10	10	"March to the Sea"	Allan Kroeker	Tyler Burkett & Ivy Mariel Pruss	August 10, 2016	2.31
Grace thwarts Mac's attempt to blackmail the Bishop; and deals with Sophia's father, Ray, who has doubts about Grace's parenting. In other events, Charity, who's fed up with being disrespected, finally speaks up to the family.
11	11	"Men Like Trees Walking"	Gregg Araki	Casey Vandeventer	August 17, 2016	2.12
Surrounded by scandal, the church is losing money and members; Ray tries to get custody of Sophia; Jacob's offers to help are rejected; Kevin gains closure.
12	12	"Veni, Vidi, Vici"	Regina King	Robert Engels	August 24, 2016	2.09
Grace, Ray and Sophia go to court; Basie, the Bishop and Jacob discuss an opportunity at Triumph; Deacon Sykes wants to hold a "women's day" at a smaller venue; Adrian gets the wrong idea about his lunch with Kevin; Mavis has problems with her club; and Kevin shares his feelings with Charity, leading to catastrophic results.
13	13	"What Are You Doing Here?"	Clement Virgo	Craig Wright	August 31, 2016	2.37
Lady Mae wants to preach at the "Women's Day" event but Deacon Sykes is not convinced; Basie wants Jacob to run a new community center that will be built near Calvary; Lady Mae confronts Mavis; and Mac returns home, leaving Grace and the rest of the Greenleaf family suspicious.

=== Season 2 (2017) ===
No. overall	No. in season	Title	Directed by	Written by	Original release date	U.S. viewers (millions)
14	1	"A House Divided"	Clement Virgo	Story by : Craig Wright & Katherine McGhee-Anderson; Teleplay by : Craig Wright	March 8, 2017	1.64
The Greenleaf family is left reeling in the aftermath of Mac's release; Lady Mae makes a last-minute attempt in order to save the Bishop; and Pastor Basie's announcement opens a rift between the Bishop and Jacob.
15	2	"Strange Bedfellows"	Charles Randolph-Wright	Erica L. Anderson	March 15, 2017	1.35
Jacob meets with Basie to talk about his new role at Triumph II, Calvary's new rival church; the Bishop takes care of some unfinished business with his father-in-law and runs into Mac; as Kerissa prepares her family to leave the Greenleaf home she tours her and Jacob's new residence; and Grace meets with a journalist (Rick Fox) who's been closely following the Greenleaf family.
16	3	"A Mother's Love"	Tanya Hamilton	David Ehrman	March 22, 2017	1.32
After one of Mac's victims attempts suicide, Grace makes a rash decision that may have lasting consequences; Kevin's mother (Denise Burse) visits, exposing old wounds; and Lady Mae tries to reason with Jacob.
17	4	"Revival"	Janice Cooke	Mando Alvarado & Chelsey Lora	March 29, 2017	1.25
Bishop and Lady Mae preside over Calvary's Fall Revival, and decide to take action against Basie; Lady Mae and Grace connect with old friends; and Grace confronts Mac's new girlfriend.
18	5	"Point of No Return"	Clement Virgo	Ivy Mariel Pruss	April 5, 2017	1.23
When Basie hears about the injunction filed to stop construction of Triumph Two, he stages a sit-in at Calvary in an attempt to force Bishop's hand. In other events, Grace's plan to put Mac away hits a snag.
19	6	"The Royal Family"	Allan Kroeker	Erica Butler & Craig Wright	April 12, 2017	1.34
Kevin and Charity begin divorce proceedings, but the circumstances are exacerbated when Lady Mae learns the truth about Kevin; and Grace and Darius's relationship reaches a stalemate.
20	7	"Born To Trouble"	Geary McLeod	Art Alamo	April 19, 2017	1.35
The anniversary of Faith's death is at hand and Grace shows no sign of giving up her pursuit of Mac. Basie and Jacob, meanwhile, receive bad news regarding Triumph Two's finances.
21	8	"And The Sparks Fly Upward"	Clement Virgo	Erica L. Anderson	April 26, 2017	1.34
In the mid-season finale, Jacob makes Triumph pastor Basie Skanks an offer to clear his debt and gain full control of Triumph II; and Mac receives bad news from Skip Leonard that puts him in an explosive collision course with Grace.
22	9	"The Bear"	Clement Virgo	Erica L. Anderson	May 3, 2017	1.81
In the mid-season premiere, Grace and Mac's showdown leads to his death and sends shockwaves through the family; Jacob offers the Bishop an olive branch; and Kevin makes a decision that leaves Charity reeling.
23	10	"Call Not Complete"	Dawn Wilkinson	Ty Burkett	May 10, 2017	1.25
Jacob and Kerissa establish their new ministry; Charity desperately tries to reach Kevin; and Darius gets an offer that may take him out of Memphis, leaving Grace to wonder where she fits in his life.
24	11	"Changing Season"	Janice Cooke	Lolis Eric Elie	May 17, 2017	1.46
When Sophia and Zora are excluded from the upcoming debutante cotillion, Lady Mae sets out to make things right; Grace is inspired by Basie's sermon; and Charity reaches out to Carlton.
25	12	"The House Rules"	Nicole Rubio	Art Alamo	August 30, 2017	1.36
Basie's sermon regarding inclusivity in the church goes viral, lighting a fire under Grace and provoking the Bishop's suspicions. In other events, Kerissa pushes Jacob to get a day job.
26	13	"Silence and Loneliness"	Billie Woodruff	Mando Alvarado & Chelsey Lora	September 6, 2017	1.50
A series of recurring nightmares leaves Grace unnerved; Charity looks to take her relationship with Jabari to the next level; and Bishop gives Basie an ultimatum.
27	14	"The Father's Will"	Janice Cooke	Casey Vandeventer	September 13, 2017	1.44
Lionel returns and drops a bombshell on Bishop and Lady Mae; Charity receives great news from Jabari; and Jacob encounters resistance on his first day as head of Triumph; and Grace is ready to take her relationship with Darius to the next level.
28	15	"Two by Two"	Tanya Hamilton	Art Alamo	September 20, 2017	1.57
Charity's plan to go on tour hits a roadblock; Skip Leonard offers Jacob an enticing deal; and Lady Mae suddenly finds herself at odds with the Bishop.
29	16	"The Pearl"	Clement Virgo	Craig Wright & David Ehrman	September 27, 2017	1.40
The tensions in Zora and Isaiah's relationship come to a head at the cotillion. In other events, Lady Mae confronts and make an overture of peace to Mavis, and the result is a revelation that sends Mae into a tailspin.

=== Season 3 (2018) ===
No. overall	No. in season	Title	Directed by	Written by	Original release date	U.S. viewers (millions)
30	1	"Strange Currents"	Clement Virgo	Craig Wright	August 28, 2018	1.74
The Bishop and Lady Mae's crumbling marriage threatens to destroy the Greenleaf family, then a two-million dollar IRS tax bill arrives at Calvary, putting the church in danger. Jacob and Tasha want Britney fired from triumph.
31	2	"The Space Between"	Charles Randolph-Wright	Kriss Turner Towner	August 29, 2018	1.39
Grace takes Rochelle up on her offer to help start a legal defense fund; Bishop and Lady Mae ask if parishioner Clara Jackson's Powerball winnings can assist with their IRS bill.
32	3	"Chain of Command"	Janice Cooke	David Ehrman	September 5, 2018	1.13
The Bishop surprises Lady Mae with divorce papers. Grace does a newspaper interview in Mae's place, while deploying Darius to investigate Rochelle.
33	4	"The Underdog"	Clement Virgo	Art Alamo	September 12, 2018	1.55
Lady Mae visits world famous Pastor Maxine Patterson and endures the Bishop's final attempt to win her back at a Round Table party. Connie asks if Grace is interested in running Calvary. Zora faces the consequences of her actions and gets into a nasty fight with Sophia. Charity and Kevin face tough challenges as they try to put their lives back together. Darius gives Grace some shocking news.
34	5	"Closing Doors"	Allan Kroeker	Ivy Mariel Pruss	September 19, 2018	1.42
The Bishop and Lady Mae make alternate plans after Clara denies them the check for the IRS bill; Grace tends to Sophia when a medical emergency sends her daughter to the hospital.
35	6	"She Changes Everything"	Pete Chatmon	Craig Wright	October 3, 2018	1.08
The Bishop and Lady Mae have an announcement to make to the congregation the day Maxine Patterson comes to visit Calvary. Grace and Rochelle find a case for their legal defense fund. Zora suffers mood swings after she is forced to stay at mae's house without her parents.
36	7	"That Was Then"	Aurora Guerrero	Lolis Eric Elie	October 10, 2018	1.17
Grace questions her involvement in the Coralie Hunter case when the district attorney threatens to reopen her case with Mac; the Bishop and Lady Mae disagree on hosting A Day With Lady Mae at Calvary.
37	8	"Dea Abscondita"	Charles Randolph-Wright	Erica Michelle Butler	October 17, 2018	1.21
The Greenleaf clan struggles again when another Zora related incident impacts the family. Grace tries to convince Coralie not to take the D.A.'s plea deal.
38	9	"Runaway Train"	Clement Virgo	Craig Wright	October 24, 2018	1.24
The Bishop struggles as to whether or not he'll sign the divorce papers. Grace realizes her father will need help at Calvary once Lady Mae is gone.
39	10	"The Promised Land"	Allan Kroeker	Karen Cornielle	October 31, 2018	1.18
Grace discovers Rochelle's true identity with a little help from Darius. As Kerissa welcomes Triumph's new accountant, she soon discovers that two hundred thousand dollars is missing from the church fund. Tasha Comes clean to Kerissa.
40	11	"The End Is Near"	Rose Troche	David Ehrman & Casey Vandeventer	November 7, 2018	1.33
Calvary and Triumph are raided on suspicion of embezzlement. An explosive conversation with Aaron puts a life-altering question in Grace's mind.
41	12	"Day of Reckoning"	Charles Randolph-Wright	Kriss Turner Towner	November 14, 2018	1.19
A Day with Lady Mae has Bishop concerned of his status at Calvary, Grace seeks out the truth, and later helps Jacob try to put their family name back in a good light.
42	13	"The New Life"	Clement Virgo	Craig Wright	November 21, 2018	1.29
The joy that Mae feels from her successful day at Calvary comes to a swift end. Grace steps up at a crucial time.

=== Season 4 (2019) ===
No. overall	No. in season	Title	Directed by	Written by	Original release date	U.S. viewers (millions)
43	1	"Original Sin"	Clement Virgo	Craig Wright	September 3, 2019	1.20
On the first Sunday after Harmony and Hope's installation at Calvary, the Greenleaf family's united front shatters; Grace attempts to lead the church's loyalties back toward the Greenleafs, but a call from Noah brings a long buried secret to light.
44	2	"Did I Lose You?"	Rachel Raimist	Kriss Turner Towner	September 10, 2019	1.12
While engaging in a power struggle with Phil, Grace walks a tightrope, uncertain of what to do in regards to her secret; Bishop discovers something about a rival, making it possible to win back Mae and the church.
45	3	"Visions and Dreams"	Charles Randolph-Wright	David Ehrman & Ivy Mariel Pruss	September 17, 2019	1.11
While facing her past, Grace gives Phil the opportunity to impress key church leadership; Lady Mae steps in to do damage control in Grace's absence, and she is forced to face Mac's ghost and her own stained reputation.
46	4	"A Common Enemy"	Crystle Roberson	Craig Wright	September 24, 2019	0.98
Bob Whitmore returns to Memphis, Tennessee to remind Grace that he is the one in charge and to encourage her to consider a new idea he has for Calvary; on a mission to uncover what's been going on between Noah and Grace, Charity makes a phone call.
47	5	"Unwanted"	Allan Kroeker	Jenna Wycoff & Steven Fulcher	October 1, 2019	1.08
The fractures between Bishop and Lady Mae deepen and old wounds are reopened as he considers an invitation to preach elsewhere; Grace struggles to keep her secret and the church under compartmentalized control.
48	6	"The Stranger"	Lisa Leone	Erica Michelle Butler	October 8, 2019	1.08
Unable to keep her hidden secret any longer, and in desperate need of allies, Grace finally confesses to her family, but not all of the Greenleafs are on her side. The situation gets even more complicated by police, lies, affairs, and the interests of Harmony and Hope.
49	7	"Reunited"	Ayoka Chenzira	Craig Wright & Nick Kilgore	October 15, 2019	0.89
The Bishop plans a romantic surprise for Lady Mae; Lady Mae learns that her name is being erased from the scholarship fund at Calvary and sets out to protect her legacy.
50	8	"Surprise!"	Eric Dean Seaton	Casey Vandeventer	October 22, 2019	1.11
Disloyalties are revealed as Lady Mae and Bishop throw an impromptu party to subvert Harmony and Hope's plans for Calvary; Charity's loyalties are questioned; Grace navigates between playing the obedient pastor for Judee Whitmore and her parents' schemes.
51	9	"God's Justice"	Allen Kroeker	Craig Wright & Karen Cornellie	October 29, 2019	1.09
Bishop moves to prevent Judee Whitmore's proposed governance structure; Jacob and Kerissa attempt to mend their wounds; a secret about Phil threatens his relationship with Charity; Grace realizes that what is right has never been less clear.
52	10	"Gratitude"	Clement Virgo	Craig Wright	November 5, 2019	1.00
Mae and James's relationship is tested as Bob Whitmore returns to Calvary; Phil asks Charity for a very important yes; Fernando Amable gives Kerissa information about the Greenleaf's hazy past; Lady Mae considers an offer that would achieve her dream. Bob confronts Phil about his misdeeds and personal relationships are rebuilt and tested.

=== Season 5 (2020) ===
No. overall	No. in season	Title	Directed by	Written by	Original release date	U.S. viewers (millions)
53	1	"The First Day"	Clement Virgo	Craig Wright	June 23, 2020	1.31
With Calvary's imminent demolition, Lady Mae and Bishop seek a sign from God; Jacob digs into the family mansion's past; and Grace learns the real reason why Bob Whitmore is so invested in keeping the Calvary congregation under his wing. Bishop and Mae talk about their marriage. Charity is glum and nobody knows why. Later, A.J. and Grace talk about past events and later A.J. is found almost dead on the floor.
54	2	"The Second Day"	Charles Randolph-Wright	Art Alamo	June 30, 2020	1.14
Noah returns to help Grace with A.J., offering her stability; Bishop and Lady Mae take a walk through their history when they visit Mavis's club as a potential venue; Jacob uncovers a shocking revelation about the history of the Greenleaf family home. shocking revelations rock the family and past misdeeds cause tension between the family members.
55	3	"The Third Day"	Damian Marcano	Wayne Conley	July 7, 2020	1.28
The family continues to face past misdeeds. Grace is torn between pursuing Bob Whitmore's past and her family; Lady Mae and Bishop face challenges to their seedling dream of a new church; Jacob makes a discovery about the mansion's history.
56	4	"The Fourth Day"	Princess Monique Filmz	Art Alamo & Ivy Mariel Pruss	July 14, 2020	1.24
Grace discovers a key informant during her investigation into Edenvale Lending. Charity's desire to honor the church's past may threaten her future within it. Bishop decides to take the issue of the house into his own hands. The family has some shocking decisions and revelations to make.
57	5	"The Fifth Day"	Crystle Roberson	Jenna Wycoff & Steven Fulcher	July 21, 2020	1.23
Holding a small service at home, the Greenleaf family contemplates its future and what it might mean to start over; Noah shares an insight into the house's history; Lady Mae goes to see Tara James and returns with a startling revelation.
58	6	"The Sixth Day"	Lisa Leone	Art Alamo & Erica Michelle Butler	July 28, 2020	1.36
Bishop reels from the return of an old enemy, pushing Lady Mae to unveil a family secret; Charity makes Phil face his past, while Grace and Darius learn the shocking truth about Bob Whitmore and Edenvale Lending. Shocking revelations continue to form within the family.
59	7	"The Seventh Day"	Charles Randolph-Wright	Kriss Turner Towner	August 4, 2020	1.34
The day of Calvary's demolition has arrived; Grace is determined to do whatever she can to stop it while Bob Whitmore prepares for a big announcement; it's the Greenleafs versus Harmony and Hope and neither will go down without a fight. Meanwhile, Lady Mae tries to negotiate for the mansion, but a reveal about the original owner prompts Bishop to reveal something of his own. Later, he suffers a stroke and passes away with Mae asking him what "I do" means.
60	8	"Behold"	Clement Virgo	Craig Wright	August 11, 2020	1.35
A heartbreaking end for the Greenleaf family as they mourn the loss of one of their own. Grace takes a big step and the family puts the past to rest.

== Ratings ==
Greenleaf : U.S. viewers per episode (millions)

Season	Episode number																Average
Season	1	2	3	4	5	6	7	8	9	10	11	12	13	14	15	16	Average
1	3.04	1.93	2.05	1.88	2.06	1.79	2.17	1.74	2.07	2.31	2.12	2.09	2.37	–			2.11
2	1.64	1.35	1.32	1.25	1.23	1.34	1.35	1.34	1.81	1.25	1.46	1.36	1.50	1.44	1.57	1.40	1.41
3	1.74	1.39	1.13	1.55	1.42	1.08	1.17	1.21	1.24	1.18	1.33	1.19	1.29	–			1.30
4	1.20	1.12	1.11	0.98	1.08	1.08	0.89	1.11	1.09	1.00	–						1.07
5	1.31	1.14	1.28	1.24	1.23	1.36	1.34	1.35	–								1.28

Audience measurement performed by Nielsen Media Research
