= Greenleaf (TV series) =

American drama television series (2016–2020)

- Genre: Drama; Mystery
- Created by: Craig Wright
- Starring: Merle Dandridge; Kim Hawthorne; Desiree Ross; Lamman Rucker; Tye White; Lynn Whitfield; Deborah Joy Winans; Keith David; Lovie Simone; Greg Alan Williams; Rick Fox
- Country of origin: United States
- Original language: English
- No. of seasons: 5
- No. of episodes: 60 (list of episodes)

Production
- Executive producers: Oprah Winfrey; Craig Wright; Clement Virgo
- Producer: Gerrit van der Meer
- Production locations: Atlanta, Georgia
- Running time: 42 minutes
- Production companies: Pine City; Harpo Films; Lionsgate Television

Original release
- Network: Oprah Winfrey Network
- Release: June 21, 2016 – August 11, 2020

Greenleaf is an American drama television series created by Craig Wright, and executive produced by Oprah Winfrey and Lionsgate Television. Clement Virgo also serves as an executive producer and director. It stars Keith David, Lynn Whitfield, and Merle Dandridge. Greenleaf premiered on the Oprah Winfrey Network (OWN) on June 21, 2016.

On November 23, 2018, OWN renewed the series for a fourth season. The fourth season premiered on September 3, 2019. On November 15, 2019, OWN confirmed the renewal of a fifth and final season of the series, which premiered on June 23, 2020. In 2021, a spinoff of Greenleaf was in the works at OWN, and would have focused on Whitfield's character and her new role as senior pastor. However, no further developments have occurred since then.

== Premise ==
Greenleaf follows the unscrupulous world of the Greenleaf family with scandalous secrets and lies, their palatial family mansion compound, and their sprawling Memphis megachurch with predominantly African-American members. The series' lead characters are Bishop James Greenleaf (David) and Lady Mae Greenleaf (Whitfield), the patriarch and matriarch of the Greenleaf family, and Grace Greenleaf (Dandridge), their estranged daughter, who has returned home after 20 years following the mysterious death of her sister, Faith. Deep down, this family cares for and loves each other, but secrets, lies, adultery, sibling rivalry, and other issues swarm the family as they try to keep themselves together. There are a variety of people who try to run the family out of their beloved church, but they lay it all on the line to keep each other tight and close like any family.

== Production ==
=== Development ===
On July 30, 2015, OWN announced that it had ordered Greenleaf—a new drama following an African-American megachurch run by the eponymous family in Memphis, Tennessee. Both Greenleaf and another series announced that year, Queen Sugar, were the first scripted series acquired by OWN that were not produced by Tyler Perry. The series was created by Lost and Six Feet Under writer Craig Wright and executive produced by Oprah Winfrey with Wright and Lionsgate Television, with 13 episodes for the first season set for production later in 2015. On September 9, 2015, The Book of Negroes writer and director Clement Virgo joined the series as executive producer and director of the pilot episode.

Filming of the first season began in October, 2015 in Atlanta, and ended on March 24, 2016. On January 21, 2016, it was announced that the series would debut with a two-night premiere at 10 p.m. Tuesday, May 24, 2016 and 10 p.m. Wednesday, May 25, and would regularly air on Wednesdays at 10 p.m. Later premiere was moved to June 21, 2016 and June 22, 2016. The world premiere of Greenleaf was during the Tribeca Film Festival in April, before its television debut in June, of 2016.

In 2020, it was announced that Craig Wright is writing a spinoff for the series. The series will focus on Lady Mae's new role as pastor of a church.

=== Casting ===
Casting advertising began in August 2015. On August 24, 2015, it was announced that Lynn Whitfield, Merle Dandridge and Desiree Ross are the first actors cast in the series. Emmy Award winner Whitfield will star as Lady Mae Greenleaf, Bishop Greenleaf's wife, steely and power and money hungry matriarch of the family, while Dandridge play her estranged daughter who returns to home with her teenage daughter (played by Ross). On September 3, 2015, Keith David was cast in the leading role of Bishop James Greenleaf, the family patriarch and leader of Calvary Fellowship World Ministries. On September 4, 2015 Tye White has been cast as son-in-law of the Bishop. On September 9, 2015, Lamman Rucker, Kim Hawthorne and Deborah Joy Winans have landed the last three regular roles. Rucker plays eldest son, Jacob, while Hawthorne stars as his controlling wife, Kerissa. Winans plays Charity, the youngest daughter of the Bishop.

On September 24, 2015, it was announced that series' executive producer Oprah Winfrey joined Greenleaf in a recurring role as Mavis McCready, the sister of Lady Mae Greenleaf. Whitfield and Winfrey previous co-starred in the 1989 miniseries The Women of Brewster Place. On November 20, 2015, Anna Diop was cast as a teacher who is engaged to Greenleaf Estate's manager. Three days later, it was announced that Terri J. Vaughn will recur as chief housekeeper at Greenleaf mansion.

For the second season, Lovie Simone and Gregory Alan Williams were promoted to series regulars after appearing as recurring in almost all episodes in the first season.

== Cast and characters ==
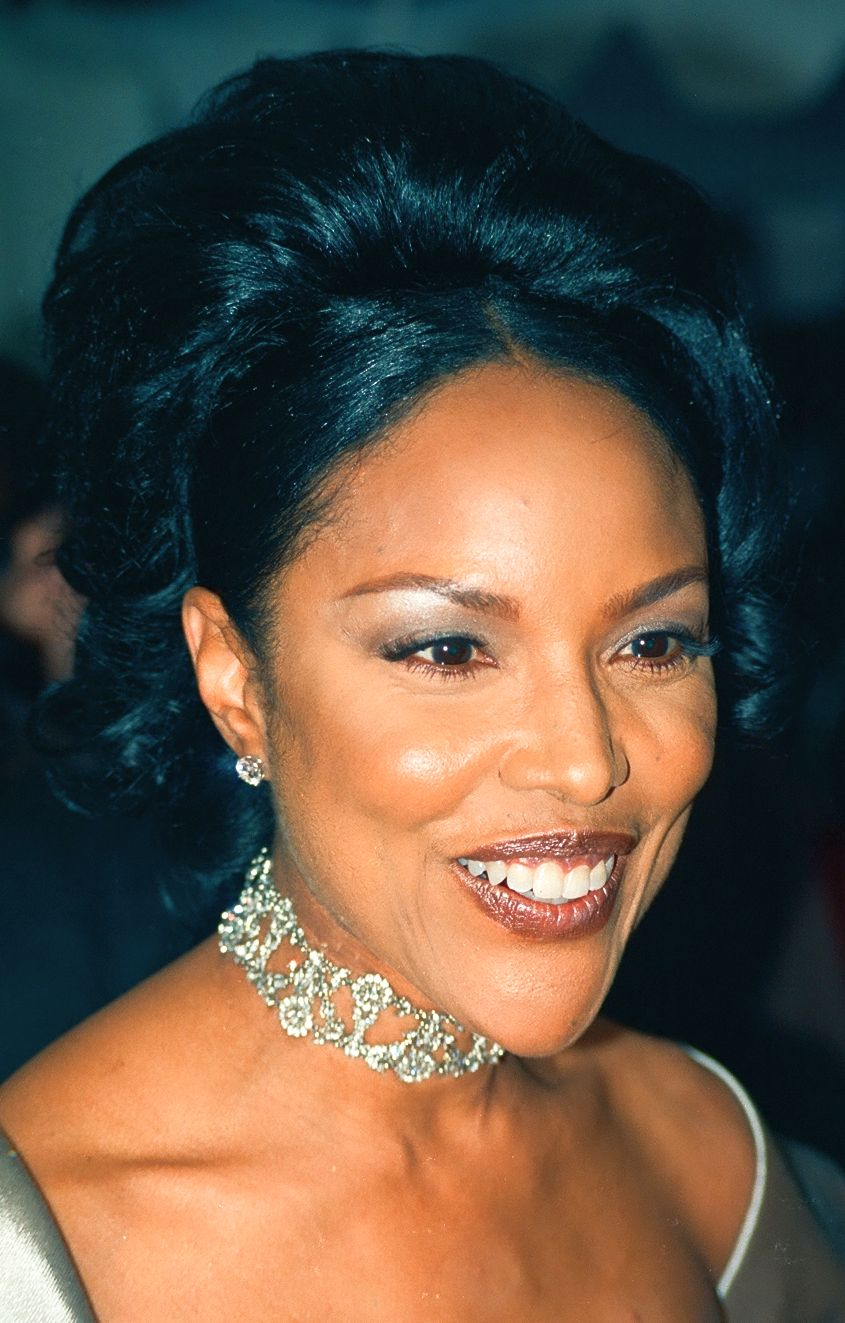
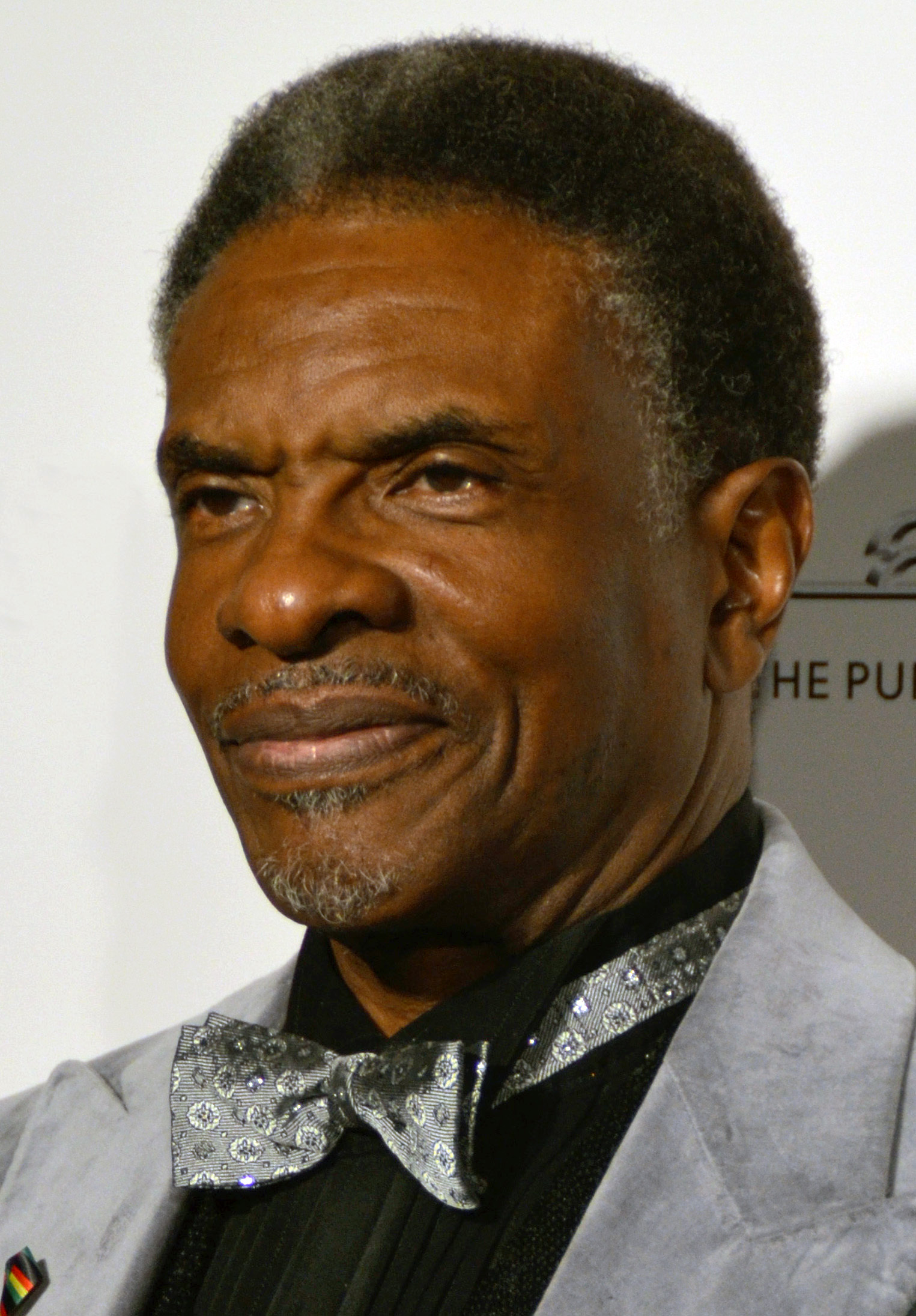
Lynn Whitfield and Keith David star in the series.

=== Main cast ===
- Keith David as Bishop James Greenleaf, the charismatic and strong leader of Calvary Fellowship World Ministries and Greenleaf family patriarch.
- Lynn Whitfield as "First Lady" Daisy Mae Greenleaf, née McCready, James' intermittent wife, First Lady of Calvary Fellowship and family matriarch. As a matriarch, she cares for her family, but also, with questionable morals, she blackmailed her sister Mavis, shared an affair with her father and brother, and hid her brother's allegations.
- Merle Dandridge as Pastor Grace "Gigi" Greenleaf, Mae and Bishop's eldest child. She returns home 20 years after escaping from the family, having run away after her uncle Mac tried to rape her. Her mother and siblings consistently deplore her "desertion"; however, some time later, this causes a conflict in the family when it is discovered that his mother had hidden Mac's crimes. She proudly serves as Executive Pastor of Ministry at Calvary Fellowship under Bishop and First Lady Greenleaf Leadership.
- Desiree Ross as Sophia Greenleaf, Grace's teenage daughter, who shares her mother's charms and is the granddaughter of Mae and James.
- Lamman Rucker as Pastor Jacob Greenleaf, the second-born child and only son of the Bishop. He resents Grace for abandoning the family and leaving him to take her place in the ministry, crushing his dream of a career in professional baseball. He previously and proudly served as Associate Pastor of Discipleship, and now serves as Senior Pastor of Triumph Fellowship Church. He has great affection and is responsible for protecting his niece Sophia, reconciles with Grace, and divorces Kerissa at the end of the series after years of infidelity on both sides.
- Kim Hawthorne as Kerissa Greenleaf, Jacob's ambitious and controlling wife, headmistress of the Academy of Excellence, and daughter-in-law of Mae and James, was complicit with Mae in covering up the evidence against Mac, and divorces Jacob at the end of the series after Jacob discovered that she had been unfaithful and had infected him with chlamydia.
- Deborah Joy Winans as Charity Greenleaf, the youngest daughter of the Greenleafs and also a music minister at Calvary Fellowship. As the youngest, she is furious at being excluded from family situations. Like Jacob, she resents Grace for abandoning the family, forcing Charity to remain tied to her family's church, but later becomes understanding upon learning the family's dark secrets, the reason Grace abandoned the family, and divorced Kevin.
- Tye White as Kevin Satterlee, Charity's husband and later ex and father of her son (seasons 1–3).
- Gregory Alan Williams as Robert "Mac" McCready, brother of Mae and Mavis, a church executive and financial accounts manager but secretly a child molester, James' financial front man and his sister Mae's lover, was responsible for Grace's escape from the family by attempting to rape her, abused Faith with whom he had a secret affair, is arrested after several victims report him but is released from prison when James and Mae bribe the judges under threats from Mac, is killed by Grace after an altercation where he attempted to kill her (recurring season 1; main season 2).
- Lovie Simone as Zora Greenleaf, Kerissa and Jacob's rebellious teenage daughter and Mae and James' granddaughter (recurring season 1; main seasons 2–5).
- Rick Fox as Darius Nash, a journalist for the Tennessee Statesman and friend of Grace (recurring seasons 2 and 5; main season 3).

=== Recurring cast ===
- Oprah Winfrey as Mavis McCready, Lady Mae and Mac's estranged sister, also once the bishop's secret lover and a close confidant of Grace; once a nightclub owner (seasons 1–2).
- Cortez McCauley as Jacob "Winkie" Greenleaf Jr., Jacob and Kerissa's son and Zora's younger brother and youngest grandchild of Mae and James (seasons 1–5).
- Terri J. Vaughn as Melisse, chief housekeeper at Greenleaf mansion (season 1).
- Benjamin Patterson as Noah Kendall, Greenleaf Estate's manager, church security chief, and Gigi's ex-boyfriend and childhood sweetheart and A.J.'s father, whom he shares with Grace (seasons 1, 4–5).
- Anna Diop as Isabel, a teacher engaged to Greenleaf Estate's manager, Noah Kendall (season 1).
- Bill Cobbs as Henry McCready, father of Mae, Mavis and Mac, psychologically abused Mac and Mavis, had a sexual and incestuous relationship with Mae, dies alone, while secretly scamming and stealing church funds (seasons 1–2).
- Michael Rodrick as Ray Fisher, Sophia's father from Arizona (season 1).
- Kristin Erickson as Alexa Campbell, the Bishop's secretary and mistress of Jacob (seasons 1 and 5).
- Terri Abney as Faith Greenleaf, Mae and Bishop's late daughter and third child, who dies before the first episode; she was raped by Mac, with whom she had a secret relationship, with Lady Mae's consent (season 1).
- Jen Harper as Deacon Connie Sykes, Mae's arch-frenemy and longtime member of the Deacon Board who encourages Grace to take a stand (seasons 1–5).
- Roxzane T. Mims as Darlene, the second secretary whose daughter Vida was one of Mac's rape victims (seasons 1–5).
- Parnell Damone Marcano as Carlton Cruise, Calvary's choir director (seasons 1–5).
- Karan Kendrick as Wanda, Charity's confidante and assistant in the Ministry of Music (seasons 1–2).
- Avis-Marie Barnes as Misty Williams, a deacon board member who often disagrees with the Bishop along with her husband, Fred (seasons 1–5).
- L. Warren Young as Fred Williams, a deacon board member who often disagrees with the Bishop along with his wife, Misty (seasons 1–5).
- Carlacia Grant as Danielle Turner, a teenage girl who was one of Mac's rape victims (seasons 1–2).
- Deji LaRay as David Nelson, a cop who seeks spiritual help at Calvary in the wake of a police brutality protest against him. He is killed by the brother of the teen he had shot down (season 1).
- Zachary S. Williams as William, a worker at Mavis's bar (season 1).
- Kedrick Brown as Breezy, a man who knew the Bishop's late daughter Faith (season 1).
- Chevonne Hughes as Karine Jackson, an assistant of the Bishop at Calvary (seasons 1–5).
- Jason Dirden as Basie Skanks, a pastor of Greenleaf's rival church Triumph who is a thorn in the side of the Bishop (seasons 1–3).
- Roshon Fegan as Isaiah Hambrick, Zora's ex-boyfriend, a young Christian singer and Triumph baddie who abuses Zora both verbally and physically, and is a thorn in Sophia's side. Sophia manages to end their relationship when, along with her mother and her uncle Jacob, they discover that he was a drug dealer (seasons 2–3).
- Sean Dominic as Martin Jabari Johnson, a record producer hired by Charity to produce Calvary's new album and Charity's former love interest (seasons 2–3).
- William H. Bryant as Aaron Jeffries, a lawyer hired by Calvary (seasons 2–5).
- Tim Reid as Lionel Jeffries, Aaron's father and the Bishop's friend, who once shared an intimate past with Mae (seasons 2–3).
- Antonio J. Bell as Roberto Calloway, Sophia's boyfriend who shares the same religious belief as her and deeply cares for her (seasons 2–3).
- Asia'h Epperson as Tasha Skanks, wife of Basie Skanks and rival of Mae but friend of Kerissa (seasons 2–3; guest season 5).
- LeToya Luckett as Rochelle Cross/Rochelle James, a member of the Calvary congregation (seasons 2–3, season 5).
- Patti LaBelle as Maxine Patterson, a famous Christian motivational speaker and the CEO of a global Christian self-help empire. She is also an old friend of Mae's from college (season 3).
- Beau Bridges as Bob Whitmore, a racist, corrupt preacher and owner of the Harmony & Hope megachurch franchise, who extorts Grace and her family to gain control of the church (seasons 3–5).
- Richard Gant as Percy Lee, the Bishop's old friend from college. He is the owner of a funeral home (seasons 3 and 5).
- Jacob Romero as A.J. Delajae, Grace's long-lost son, whom she shares with Noah (seasons 4–5).
- Sean Blakemore as Phillip "Phil" DeMars, the co-president of Harmony & Hope and Charity's love interest (seasons 4–5; guest season 3).
- Valerie Jane Parker as Judee Whitmore, Bob's daughter, music minister, and the new first lady of Harmony & Hope (seasons 4–5).
- Jennifer Sears as Tara James, Rochelle and Basie's sister, who, unlike them, is not ruthless (season 5).

== Episodes ==
Season	Episodes	Originally released	
Season	Episodes	First released	Last released
1	13	June 21, 2016	August 31, 2016
2	16	March 15, 2017	September 27, 2017
3	13	August 28, 2018	November 21, 2018
4	10	September 3, 2019	November 5, 2019
5	8	June 23, 2020	August 11, 2020

Ahead of its television premiere, on April 21, 2016, the series was renewed for a second season, which premiered on March 15, 2017. Season 2 returned with new episodes on a two-night premiere beginning on August 15, 2017. On August 7, 2017, the series was renewed for a third season, which premiered in a two-night premiere on August 28 and August 29, 2018, and ran until November 21, 2018. On September 19, 2018, the series was renewed for a fourth season. On May 3, 2020, OWN announced that a fifth and final season would premiere on June 23, 2020.

A one-hour special titled Greenleaf: Goin' Up Yonder premiered on June 16, 2020. A post-finale special titled Greenleaf: The Homegoing Celebration premiered on August 11, 2020.

== Reception ==
The first season of Greenleaf received mainly positive reviews from critics, who particularly praised the acting performances of the series' lead actress, Merle Dandridge, as well as Lynn Whitfield and Keith David. On Rotten Tomatoes, the first season of Greenleaf has an approval rating of 81%, based on 21 reviews. The website's critical consensus reads: "Immersed in a unique megachurch setting, Greenleaf is a juicy family soap bolstered by a provocative spirituality." Metacritic gave season one of the show a score of 68 out of 100, based on 20 critics, indicating "generally favorable reviews".

Maureen Ryan, television critic for Variety stated "Dandridge is naturalistic in her portrayal of a practical, cautious woman re-examining her family history and her own choices and mistakes, while Whitfield has the imperious aura of a grand soap opera diva in the tradition of Joan Collins." Daniel Fienberg from The Hollywood Reporter wrote in his review "effectively balance the melodrama, vast ensemble and church details and contribute a level of technical proficiency that goes far beyond what the Tyler Perry Factory brings to The Haves and the Have Nots, OWN's big scripted hit." The Boston Globe's Matthew Gilbert compared Greenleaf with primetime soaps like Revenge and the similarly black-cast Empire.

Greenleaf has received positive reviews from critics, with most praising Dandridge, Whitfield, and David's performances. The series premiere drew 3.04 million viewers, making it the No. 1 series debut in OWN history. On April 21, 2016, the series was renewed for a second season ahead of its television premiere. The second season premiered on March 15, 2017. On August 7, 2017, the series was renewed for a third season. The third season premiered in a two-episode special on August 28 and August 29, 2018. On September 19, 2018, the series was renewed for a fourth season.

== Accolades ==
Year	Award	Category	Recipient(s)	Result
2017	48th NAACP Image Awards	Outstanding Supporting Actress in a Drama Series	Lynn Whitfield	Nominated
2017	Gracie Awards	Actress in a Supporting Role - Drama	Lynn Whitfield	Won
2018	49th NAACP Image Awards	Outstanding Drama Series	Greenleaf	Nominated
2018	49th NAACP Image Awards	Outstanding Supporting Actress in a Drama Series	Lynn Whitfield	Nominated
2018	49th NAACP Image Awards	Outstanding Writing in a Dramatic Series	Erica L. Anderson (for "The Bear")	Nominated
2018	49th NAACP Image Awards	Outstanding Gospel/Christian Album (Traditional or Contemporary)	Greenleaf Soundtrack Volume 2	Won
2019	50th NAACP Image Awards	Outstanding Actor in a Dramatic Series	Keith David	Nominated
2019	50th NAACP Image Awards	Outstanding Supporting Actress in a Drama Series	Lynn Whitfield	Won
2019	50th NAACP Image Awards	Outstanding Soundtrack/Compilation	Greenleaf, Season 3 (Music from the Original TV Series)	Nominated
2020	51st NAACP Image Awards	Outstanding Drama Series	Greenleaf	Won
2020	51st NAACP Image Awards	Outstanding Supporting Actress in a Drama Series	Lynn Whitfield	Won
2021	52nd NAACP Image Awards	Outstanding Actor in a Dramatic Series	Keith David	Nominated
2021	52nd NAACP Image Awards	Outstanding Supporting Actress in a Drama Series	Lynn Whitfield	Nominated

== International broadcast ==
The series is broadcast by Netflix worldwide outside the United States and Canada.

== Soundtrack ==
The gospel songs recorded by the cast were released on iTunes, as an album entitled Greenleaf (Gospel Companion Soundtrack, Vol. 1).
