= Gerrit van der Meer =

Dutch film and television producer (born 1950)

- Born: 1950 (age 75–76); Rotterdam, Netherlands
- Education: Netherlands Film Academy (Bachelor of Arts)
- Occupation: Television producer · Film producer · Unit production manager
- Years active: 1980–present
- Notable work: Felicity, House, The Blacklist, Hemlock Grove, Greenleaf
- Spouse: Catherine DeLattre (m. 1979)
- Children: Julian (born 1989)
- Awards: Nominated for 4 Emmy Awards, Producer's Guild Award.

Gerrit "Gert" van der Meer (born 1950) is a Dutch film and television producer. Also known as a production manager, Van der Meer has worked on several Hollywood productions since 1980.
