= Drumline: A New Beat =

2014 television film directed by Bille Woodruff

- Based on: Characters by Shawn Schepps
- Written by: Regina Y. Hicks; Karen Gist
- Directed by: Bille Woodruff
- Starring: Alexandra Shipp; Leonard Roberts; Jordan Calloway; Jeff Pierre; Mario Van Peebles; DeRay Davis; Jasmine Burke; Rome Flynn; Tye White; Scott Shilstone; Lisa Arrindell Anderson; LeToya Luckett; Nick Cannon
- Music by: David Torn
- Country of origin: United States
- Original language: English

Production
- Executive producers: Susan Levison; Jill Holmes; Maggie Malina; Alexander A. Motlagh; Nick Cannon; Michael Goldman; Jody Gerson; Dallas Austin; Wendy Finerman; Lisa Zupan
- Cinematography: Joseph White
- Editor: Paul Millspaugh
- Running time: 104 minutes
- Production companies: Georgia Film; N'Credible Entertainment; The POPFilms Movie Company; Wendy Finerman Productions; Fox Television Studios

Original release
- Network: VH1
- Release: October 27, 2014

Drumline: A New Beat is a 2014 American television film directed by Bille Woodruff. It is the sequel to 2002's Drumline. The screenplay, a fictional story about a historically black college marching band, was written by Karen Gist and Regina Hicks. The story is about a young drummer from New York, played by Alexandra Shipp, who enters the fictional Atlanta A&T University and bumps heads with the leader of her new school's drum section. Jordan Calloway, Mario Van Peebles, and LeToya Luckett co-star. Leonard Roberts reprises his role as Sean Taylor. Nick Cannon reprises his role of Devon Miles and was the film's executive producer.

The film premiered on VH1 on October 21, 2014, and released to DVD on March 3, 2015.

== Plot ==
Twelve years after the events of the first film, Danielle "Dani" Raymond (Alexandra Shipp), an upper class Brooklyn girl, defies her parents in order to attend a college in Atlanta so she can join and revitalize their once-prominent drum line. Dani's quest to become the first female section leader of the drum line in the school's history will be hampered by upperclassmen including her cousin Tyree (Jeff Pierre), her feelings for bandmate and rival, Jayven (Jordan Calloway), and the school's crosstown rivals.

The rising action begins with character establishment and a meeting of the love interests on campus. Then the band grind and “training montage” begins. Leading up to the climactic final event, things go wrong and the characters have to band together to pull off the successful performance.

== Cast ==
- Alexandra Shipp as Danielle "Dani" Raymond
- Leonard Roberts as Sean Taylor
- Jordan Calloway as Jayven LaPierre
- Jeff Pierre as Tyree
- Mario Van Peebles as Dr. Chalmus Raymond
- DeRay Davis as Kevin Taylor
- Jasmine Burke as Tasha Williams
- Rome Flynn as Leon
- Tye White as Armondi Mason
- Scott Shilstone as Josh
- Lisa Arrindell Anderson as Lois Raymond
- LeToya Luckett as Dr. Nia Phillips
- Nick Cannon as Devon Miles
- Duain Richmond as Bulldog
- Pam Smith as Patrice
- Darian "Big Tigger" Morgan as himself
- Kamille Leai as Lori
- Brad Sanders as Rizzy
- Jackie Goldston as Dean Scott
- Quentin Plair as Quentin
- Gilbert Glenn Brown as Jimmy LaPierre

== Production ==
Filming began in May 2014 in Atlanta, Georgia.
