= Rome Flynn =

American actor, model and musician (born 1991)

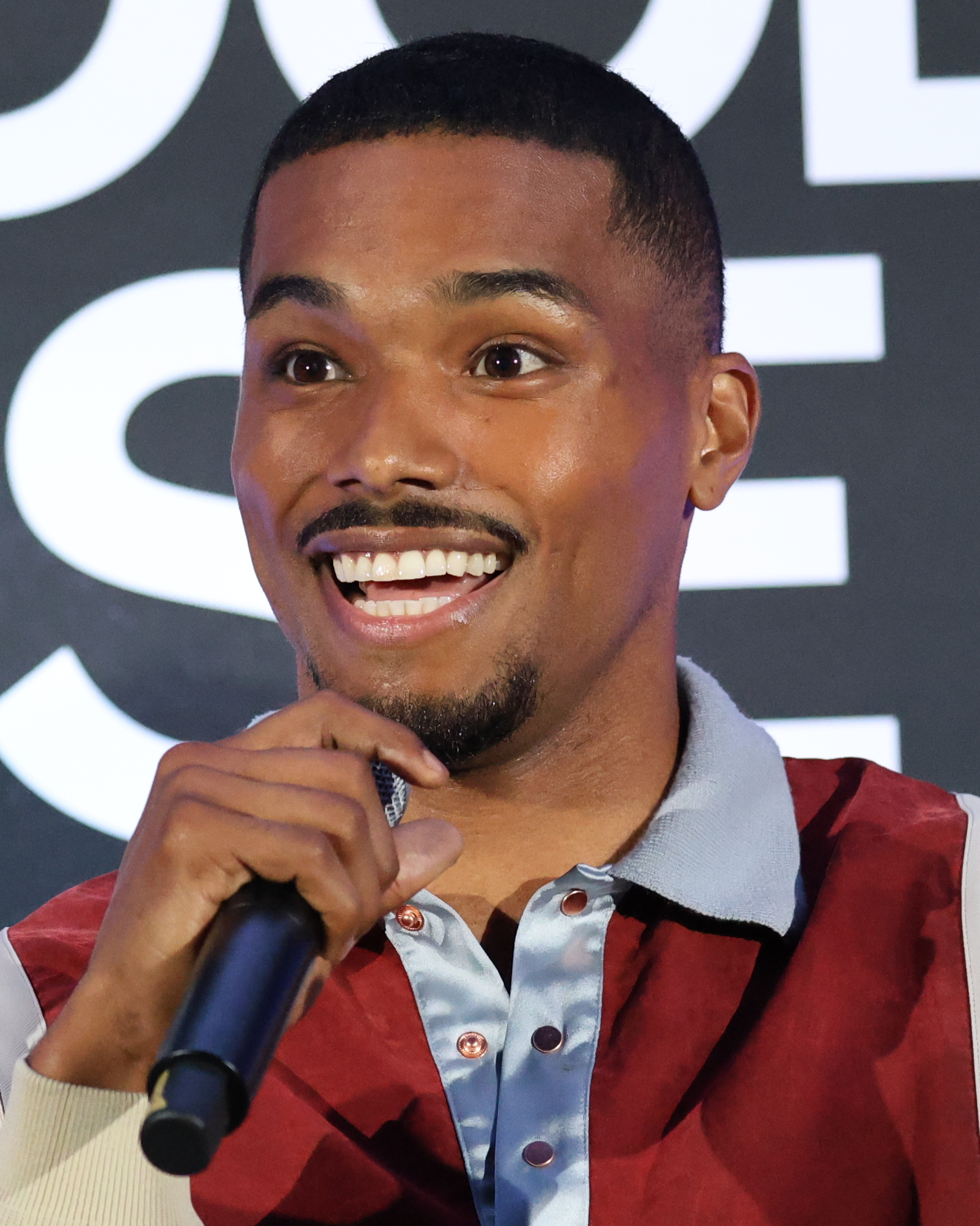
- Flynn at Essence Fest 2025
- Born: Rome Coco Flynn; November 25, 1991 (age 34); Springfield, Illinois, U.S.
- Occupations: Actor; model; musician
- Years active: 2014–present
- Children: 1

Rome Trumain Ceno Flynn (born November 25, 1991) is an American actor, model and musician. He is best known for his portrayal of Zende Forrester Dominguez on the CBS daytime drama The Bold and the Beautiful for which he won the Daytime Emmy Award for Outstanding Younger Actor in a Drama Series in 2018. His other notable roles include his portrayal of law student Gabriel Maddox in the ABC drama How to Get Away with Murder.

== Career ==
Flynn managed to get himself on the radar of casting directors by building up his social media following. In the spring of 2014, Flynn was cast in the television movie Drumline: A New Beat, the sequel to the 2002 film Drumline. Flynn was on set filming when his daughter was born.

In May 2015, Flynn joined the cast of The Bold and the Beautiful in the role of Zende. In November 2016, Flynn announced that he had been cast in the film adaptation of Gretchen McNeil's novel TEN opposite China Anne McClain.

In 2017, Flynn guest starred in episodes of the CBS crime dramas NCIS: New Orleans and MacGyver. Flynn later joined the cast of OWN's The Haves and the Have Nots. On August 17, 2017, Flynn announced on social media that he had chosen to leave The Bold and the Beautiful after two years with the series.

In 2018, after appearing in the fourth season finale of How to Get Away with Murder as Gabriel Maddox, Flynn was upped to a series regular for the fifth season.

On February 23, 2021, it was announced that Flynn had been cast as Tevin Wakefield in the second season of the Netflix series Raising Dion, executive produced by Michael B. Jordan. Later that day, it was also announced that Flynn had booked a recurring role in the fourth and final season of Justin Simien's Dear White People, also distributed by Netflix. Flynn joined the cast of Gloria Calderón Kellett's With Love, produced by Amazon Studios. In 2023, Flynn joined the cast of NBC's Chicago Fire in the recurring role of Derrick Gibson. However, the character's arc was short lived and Flynn was written out after six episodes. While he was "sad" to leave the role, Flynn hoped to work executive producer Dick Wolf again in the future. In May 2024, Flynn was cast as real-life gangster Frank Lucas in Godfather of Harlem.

== Personal life ==
Flynn is Cuban, Irish and African-American. He has a daughter, Kimiko (b. December 12, 2014). In 2015, Kimiko appeared with Flynn in a Christmas themed photo shoot for CBS Soaps In Depth.

== Filmography ==
=== Film ===
Year	Title	Role	Notes
2014	Two-A-Days	Quarterback	Short film
2019	A Madea Family Funeral	Jesse	
2019	1/2 New Year	Bishop Miller	
2022	Fantasy Football	Anderson Fisher	

=== Television ===
Year	Title	Role	Notes
2014	Drumline: A New Beat	Leon	Television film
2015–2017	The Bold and the Beautiful	Zende Forrester Dominguez	Series regular
2017	Ten: Murder Island	TJ	Television film
2017	NCIS: New Orleans	Jonathan Rudd	Episode: "Knockout"
2017	MacGyver	Kalei	Episode: "Flashlight"
2017–2019	The Haves and the Have Nots	RK	Recurring role (seasons 5–6)
2018	The Thinning: New World Order	Jack	Web film
2018–2020	How to Get Away with Murder	Gabriel Maddox	Guest (season 4), main (seasons 5–6); 31 episodes
2019	A Christmas Duet	Jesse Collins	Television film
2020	Family Reunion	Tony Olsen	Episode: "Remember Cousin Kenya?"
2021	Dear White People	David	Recurring role (season 4)
2021	With Love	Santiago Zayas	Series regular
2022	The Rookie	Morris Mackey	Episode: "End Game"
2022	Raising Dion	Tevin Wakefield	Recurring role (season 2)
2024	Chicago Fire	Derrick Gibson	Recurring role (season 12)
2025	Godfather of Harlem	Frank Lucas	Recurring role (season 4)
2025	Side Quest	Mike	Episode: "Pull List"
2026	Imperfect Women	Jordan	Recurring role

== Discography ==
=== Singles ===
==== As lead artist ====
Title	Year	Album
"Brand New"	2019	Non-album singles
"Keep Me In Mind"	2020	Non-album singles
"Drunk With You"	2020	Non-album singles
"Slide"	2022	Non-album singles

==== As featured artist ====
Title	Year	Album
"Angels" (Elijah Blake feat. Rome Flynn)	2021	The Neon Eon
"Can You Stand The Rain" (Will Gittens feat. Rome Flynn)	2022	Acoustic Covers
"I Wanna Know" (Will Gittens feat. Rome Flynn)	2023	Acoustic Covers 2

== Awards and nominations ==
Year	Award	Category	Work	Result	Ref.
2018	Daytime Emmy Award	Outstanding Younger Actor in a Drama Series	The Bold and the Beautiful	Won	

On Friday, February 14, 2025, he participated in the NBA All Star Celebrity Basketball Game, as a member of Team Bonds, coached by former MLB player Barry Bonds. Rome dazzled with fade away jumpers, deep 3’s, driving layups, and no-look passes, leading to his naming as the Celebrity Game MVP. Team Bonds defeated Team Rice, coached by former NFL wide receiver, Jerry Rice, by a score of 66-55.
