= Imperfect Women =

American television series

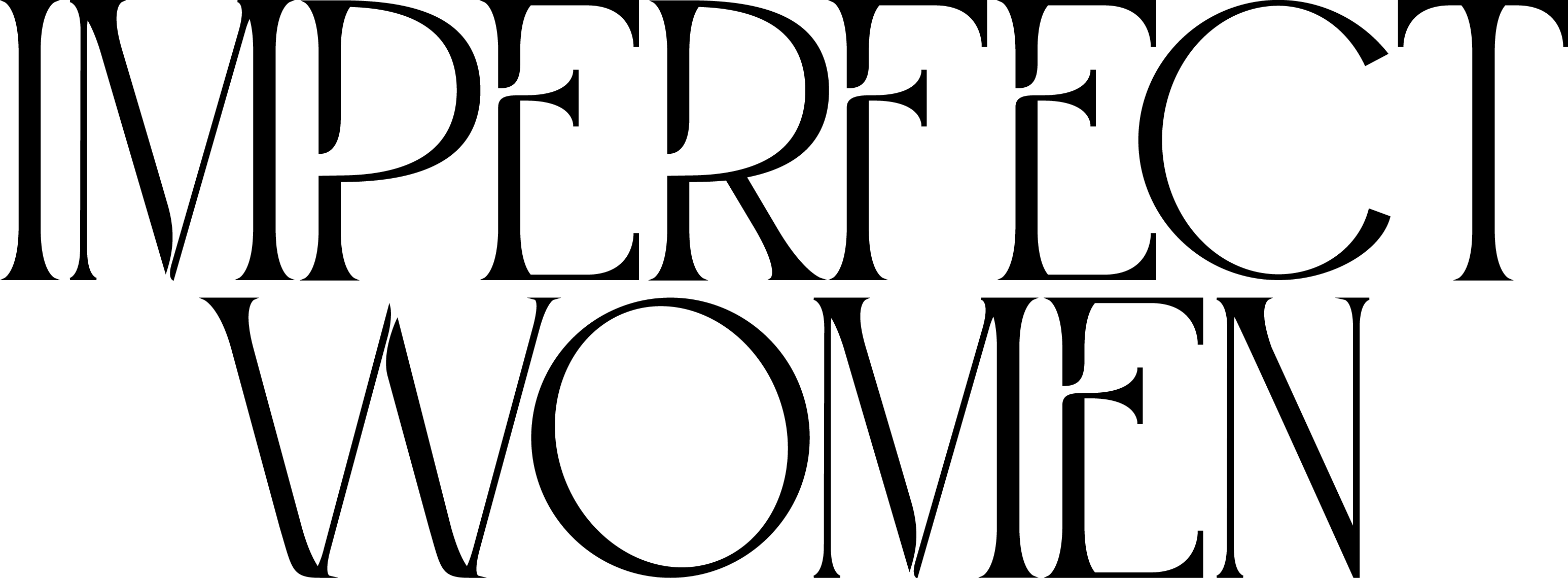
- Genre: Psychological thriller
- Created by: Annie Weisman
- Based on: Imperfect Women by Araminta Hall
- Directed by: Lesli Linka Glatter
- Starring: Kerry Washington; Joel Kinnaman; Elisabeth Moss; Kate Mara; Corey Stoll
- Music by: Siddhartha Khosla
- Country of origin: United States
- Original language: English
- No. of seasons: 1
- No. of episodes: 8

Production
- Executive producers: Araminta Hall; Kay Oyegun; Lesli Linka Glatter; Kerry Washington; Pilar Savone; Elisabeth Moss; Lindsey McManus; Annie Weisman
- Producer: Jesse Sternbaum
- Cinematography: Darran Tiernan; Laura Merians Gonçalves
- Editors: Amy E. Duddleston; Cindy Mollo; Peter Forslund; Craig Dewey
- Running time: 39–48 minutes
- Production companies: Parasox; Simpson Street; Love & Squalor Pictures; 20th Television; Apple Studios

Original release
- Network: Apple TV
- Release: March 18, 2026 – present

Imperfect Women is a psychological thriller television series starring Kerry Washington, Joel Kinnaman, Elisabeth Moss, Kate Mara, and Corey Stoll. Created by Annie Weisman, the series is an adaptation of Araminta Hall's 2020 novel Imperfect Women. It premiered on Apple TV on March 18, 2026. In October 2026, Apple TV renewed the series for a second season.

== Premise ==
A devastating crime has an impact on a decades-long friendship of three women. As Eleanor (Kerry Washington) and Mary (Elisabeth Moss) process their grief and help the police investigate Nancy's (Kate Mara) murder, the investigation unravels a dark web of secrets.

== Cast and characters ==
=== Main ===
- Kerry Washington as Eleanor
- Joel Kinnaman as Robert
- Elisabeth Moss as Mary
- Kate Mara as Nancy, Robert's deceased wife
- Corey Stoll as Howard, Mary's husband

=== Recurring ===
- Leslie Odom Jr. as Donovan, Eleanor's brother
- Audrey Zahn as Cora Hennessey, Robert and Nancy's daughter
- Ana Ortiz as Detective Bethany Ganz, a detective investigating Nancy's death
- Jill Wagner as Kit Hennessey, Robert's sister
- Wilson Bethel as Scott Reid, the ex-boyfriend of Nancy's mother who sexually assaulted her when she was a teenager
- Jackson Kelly as Marcus, Mary and Howard's teenage son
- Keith Carradine as R.L. Hennessy, Robert and Kit's fatter

=== Guest ===
- Rome Flynn as Jordan, Eleanor's subordinate with whom she is having an affair
- Sherri Saum as Zoe
- Theo Bongani Ndyalvane as Davide Boyette
- Cheyenne Jackson as Phil Delavigne
- Adam Shapiro as Andrew McFadden
- Jaclyn Hales as Patty
- Maggie Weible as Teen Nancy
- Connor Duermit as David
- Sandrine Holt as Jenny
- Ethan Suplee as Tyler
- Suleka Mathew as Kavita
- Brian Letscher as Paul
- Natasha Behnam as Julie Tisdall
- Casey Biggs as Judge Davis
- Sheryl Lee Ralph as Constance

== Episodes ==
No.	Title	Directed by	Written by	Original release date	Prod. code
1	"Eleanor"	Lesli Linka Glatter	Annie Weisman	March 18, 2026	1XUS01
2	"Crush"	Nzingha Stewart	Aaron Fullerton	March 18, 2026	1XUS02
3	"Monster"	Nzingha Stewart	Kay Oyegun	March 25, 2026	1XUS03
4	"Nancy"	Lesli Linka Glatter	Haily Hall	April 1, 2026	1XUS04
5	"Louise"	Lesli Linka Glatter	Allison Abner	April 8, 2026	1XUS05
6	"Mary"	Daina Reid	Kyle Warren	April 15, 2026	1XUS06
7	"Fabulation"	Daina Reid	Kay Oyegun & Rance Ward	April 22, 2026	1XUS07
8	"The Bridge"	Jet Wilkinson	Annie Weisman & Kay Oyegun	April 29, 2026	1XUS08

== Production ==
=== Development and casting ===
Love & Squalor Pictures initially optioned the book Imperfect Women by Araminta Hall. In March 2024, it was reported that Annie Weisman would adapt the novel and executive produce the series. Elisabeth Moss and Kerry Washington both starred and executive produced the series. Pilar Savone and Lindsey McManus also executive produces as does Hall. The series is produced by 20th Television and Apple Studios. It received Californian tax credit in December 2024. In January 2025, Kate Mara joined the cast. In February 2025, Kay Oyegun and Lesli Linka Glatter joined the series as executive producers with Glatter directing the pilot. In April 2025, Joel Kinnaman and Corey Stoll would be added in main roles, with Audrey Zahn, Rome Flynn, Ana Ortiz, and Sherri Saum, Wilson Bethel, Keith Carradine, and Jackson Kelly joined the cast in recurring roles. In June 2025, Leslie Odom Jr. joined the cast in a recurring role.

In October 2026, Apple TV renewed the series for a second season, with Justin Hillian joining as co-showrunner alongside Weisman, and Washington returning to play as Elenaor.

=== Filming ===
Filming for the first season began in May 2025 in Los Angeles.

== Release ==
The series premiered on Apple TV on March 18, 2026, with the first two episodes available immediately and the rest debuting on a weekly basis.

== Reception ==
The series holds a 43% approval rating on review aggregator Rotten Tomatoes, based on 46 critic reviews with an average rating of 5.9/10. The website's critics consensus reads, "A powerhouse trio isn't enough to save a middling narrative that lacks originality, pizzazz, and a sustainable conceit." Metacritic, which uses a weighted average, assigned a score of 54 out of 100 based on 20 critics, indicating "mixed or average".
