= Kim Hawthorne =

American actress (born 1968)

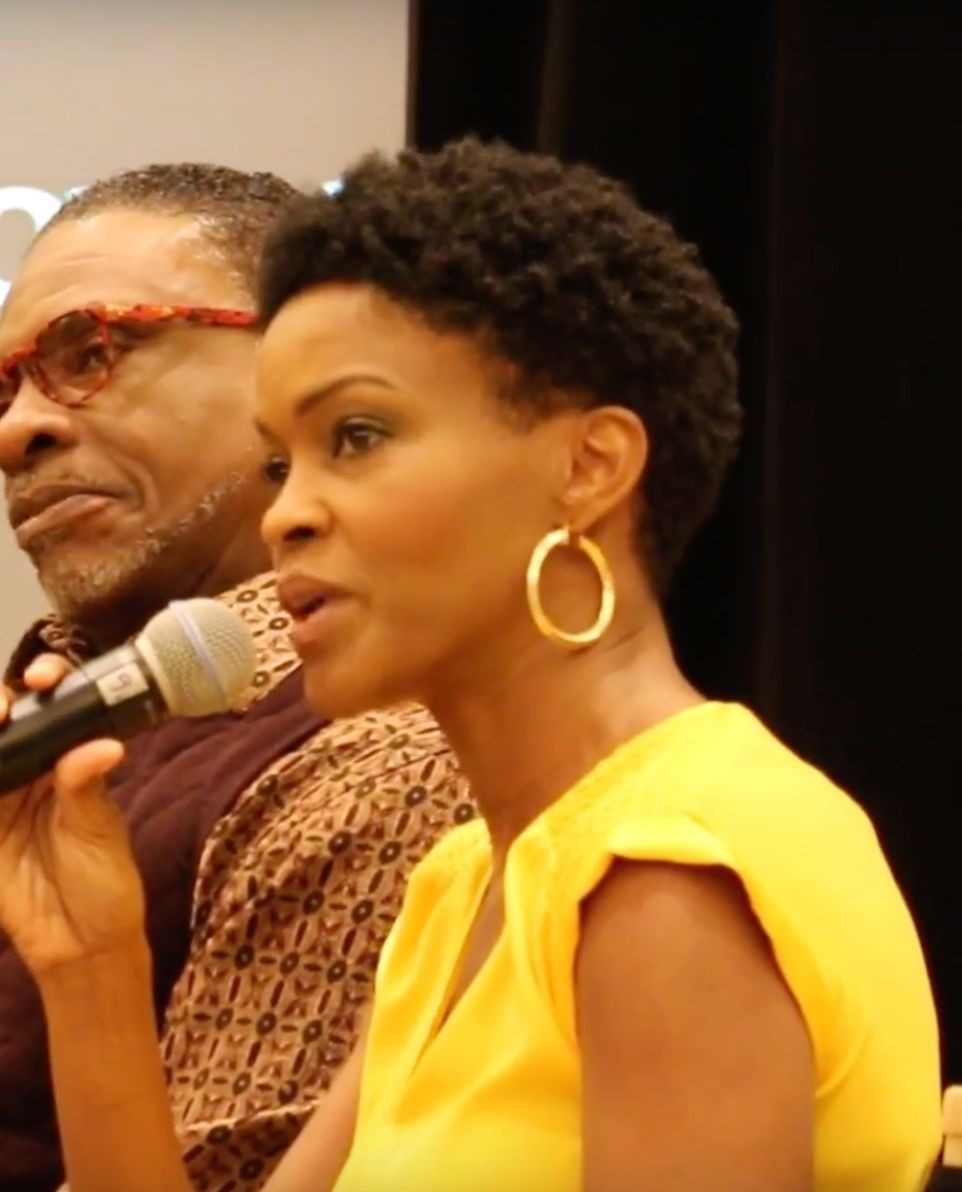
- Hawthorne in 2017
- Born: Kimberly Hawthorne; Jersey City, New Jersey, U.S
- Education: Birmingham–Southern College (BA)
- Occupation: Actress
- Years active: 1991-present

Kimberly Hawthorne is an American actress. She began her career appearing on Broadway and daytime soap operas, before landing supporting roles on the prime time dramas. From 2000 to 2005, Hawthorne was regular cast member in the CBC Television police drama, Da Vinci's Inquest. From 2016 to 2020, she starred as Kerissa Greenleaf in the Oprah Winfrey Network drama series, Greenleaf.

== Early life ==
Hawthorne was born in Jersey City, New Jersey. Attended School of Performing Arts (Arts High School) in Newark, NJ. She received her Bachelor of Arts in musical theatre from Birmingham–Southern College in Alabama. After graduating, she began working on stage, making her professional theatre debut at the Alliance Theatre in Atlanta, Georgia. In the mid-1990s, She moved to New York City, where she began appearing.

== Career ==
Hawthorne made her first screen appearance in an episode of NBC drama series, I'll Fly Away. While living in Atlanta, she also appeared in three episodes of In the Heat of the Night. From 1995 to 1996, she played Belinda Keefer in the ABC daytime soap opera, All My Children. Amelia Marshall later replaced her in this role. In 1997, Hawthorne replaced Michelle Hurd in the role of Dana Kramer on the NBC soap opera, Another World. From 1997 to 1998, she starred in Cy Coleman's Broadway musical The Life. She later guest starred on Cosby, The Outer Limits, Stargate SG-1, The Twilight Zone, Andromeda, and The L Word.

From 2000 to 2005, Hawthorne had regular supporting role on the Canadian police drama series Da Vinci's Inquest as Det. Rose Williams. In same time, she had the recurring roles on Dark Angel and Jeremiah. In 2006, she was regular cast member in the short-lived HBO comedy series, Lucky Louie starring Louis C.K. The following year, she co-starred in the Canadian drama, Whistler. In 2014, she had the recurring role on the short-lived Fox legal drama, Rake. Hawthorne also has appeared on CSI: Miami, It's Always Sunny in Philadelphia, Private Practice, Rizzoli & Isles, Southland, Castle, Criminal Minds, and NCIS: Los Angeles.

In 2015, Hawthorne was cast as one of leads in the Oprah Winfrey Network drama series, Greenleaf. She plays the role of Kerissa Greenleaf, Lamman Rucker's character's ambitious and controlling wife. The series ended in 2020 after five seasons. Hawthorne later appeared in How to Get Away with Murder, Criminal Minds and The Good Doctor. In 2022, she had a recurring roles in the Netflix legal drama series, The Lincoln Lawyer, and the CBS series, SEAL Team. In 2023, Hawthorne had a recurring role in the Peacock miniseries, Mrs. Davis.

== Filmography ==
=== Film ===
Year	Title	Role	Notes
1994	Drop Squad	Harriet	
1999	Behind the Mask	Pastor Jessie Haynes	TV movie
1999	The Wonder Cabinet	Surgeon	TV movie
2000	A Vision of Murder: The Story of Donielle	Officer Lynda Byron	TV movie
2000	Deadlocked	Ms. Tennyson	TV movie
2001	3000 Miles to Graceland	Panel Operator	
2001	See Spot Run	Cassavettes	
2001	Along Came a Spider	FBI Agent Hickley	
2001	The Wedding Dress	Laura Rodericks	TV movie
2001	HRT	Special Agent Clara Tompkins	TV movie
2003	Lucky 7	Trisha Rogers	TV movie
2003	Lightning: Bolts of Destruction	Karen Chandler	TV movie
2004	The Chronicles of Riddick	Lajjun	
2005	Murder at the Presidio	Barbara Owens	TV movie
2005	Fugitives Run	Connie	
2006	Voodoo Moon	Diana	TV movie
2012	Broken Kingdom	Nina	
2012	Playing for Keeps	ESPN Receptionist	
2013	Shoes!	Slither / Bride (voice)	Short
2014	Looking for Mr. Right	Tonya	TV movie
2019	I Am Somebody's Child: The Regina Louise Story	Gwen Ford	TV movie

=== Television ===
Year	Title	Role	Notes
1991–1994	In the Heat of the Night	Sue Howell / Faith Todd / Daphne Gordon	3 episodes
1992	I'll Fly Away	Young Woman	Episode: "Hello and Goodbye"
1995–1996	All My Children	Belinda Keefer #1	Regular Cast
1996-1999	Millennium	/ Nurse	Episode: "The Judge"
1997	Another World	Dana Kramer	Regular Cast
1998	Soul Man	Waitress	Episode: "A Kiss Is Just a Kiss"
1998	Cosby	Janice	Episode: "The Greatest Gift"
1999	Night Man	Cassandra	Episode: "NightWoman Returns"
1999	The Outer Limits	Morgan Winters	Episode: "The Haven"
1999	Beggars and Choosers	LGT Receptionist	Episode: "Unsafe Sex"
1999	First Wave	Agent Simon	Episode: "Lost Souls"
1999–2001	NASCAR Racers	Additional Voices (voice)	Recurring cast
1999–2001	Spider-Man Unlimited	Karen O'Malley (voice)	Recurring cast
2000	Stargate SG-1	Kegan	Episode: "Beneath the Surface"
2000–2001	Dark Angel	Jacinda Katsuno	Recurring cast: season 1
2000–2005	Da Vinci's Inquest	Det. Rose Williams	Main cast: season 4-7
2001	Mysterious Ways	Dr. Marissa Hamilton	Episode: "Do You See What I See?"
2001	Voyage of the Unicorn	Sphinx	Episode: "Part 1 & 2"
2001	Night Visions	Cheryl	Episode: "The Passenger List/The Bokor"
2001	Andromeda	Lawyer	Episode: "Forced Perspective"
2001–2002	Alienators: Evolution Continues	Additional Voices (voice)	Recurring cast
2001–2002	Mary-Kate and Ashley in Action!	Bernice Shaw / Dr. Sandy (voice)	Recurring cast
2002	Breaking News	Madeline Thomas	Recurring cast
2002	Just Cause	Luanne Ferris	Episode: "Above the Law"
2002	John Doe	Kelly Hayes	Episode: "Past Imperfect"
2002	The Twilight Zone	Muriel	Episode: "Chosen"
2002–2003	Stargate Infinity	Dr. Keri Mason (voice)	Episode: "Decision" & "The Answer"
2002–2003	Jeremiah	Theo	Recurring cast
2003	Gadget and the Gadgetinis	Additional Voices (voice)	Main cast
2004	Andromeda	Tri-Camille	Episode: "The Torment, the Release"
2004	The L Word	Yolanda Watkins	Episodes: "Listen Up" & "Liberally"
2004	10.5	Jill Hunter	TV mini series
2005	Commander in Chief	Agent Powers	Episodes: "First Disaster" & "First Scandal"
2006–2007	Lucky Louie	Ellen	Main cast
2007	Whistler	Jada Temple	Recurring cast: season 2
2009	CSI: Miami	Wendy Kramer	Episode: "Smoke Gets in Your CSIs"
2010	Men of a Certain Age	Debbie	Episode: "Same as the Old Boss"
2011	Law & Order: Los Angeles	Patricia	Episode: "Carthay Circle"
2011	The Young and the Restless	Judge Welchert	Regular Cast
2011	Hawthorne	Elda Hawthorne	Episode: "Price of Admission"
2011	It's Always Sunny in Philadelphia	Susan	Episode: "Sweet Dee Gets Audited"
2011	Private Practice	Joan	Episode: "Don't Stop 'Till You Get Enough"
2011	House of Payne	Kierra	Episode: "Mentoring Paynes"
2012	Rizzoli & Isles	Vonda Morris	Episode: "Love the Way You Lie"
2013	Southland	Ms. Jones	Episode: "Babel"
2014	Rake	Gloria Barzmann	Recurring cast
2015	Castle	Angela Matthews	Episode: "Castle, P.I.l"
2015	NCIS: Los Angeles	Dr. Diane Church	Episode: "Black Wind"
2015	Switched at Birth	Hope Paxton	Recurring cast: Season 4
2016	Rosewood	Ronna Burke	Episode: "Lidocaine and Long-Term Lust"
2016–2020	Greenleaf	Kerissa Greenleaf	Main cast
2017	Criminal Minds	Sandra Madsen	Episode: "Neon Terror"
2018	How to Get Away with Murder	Detective Nicholls	Episodes: "He's Dead" & "The Day Before He Died"
2019	NCIS: New Orleans	Lt. Baker	Episode: "Bad Apple"
2020	The Good Doctor	Noreen Frank	Episode: "Hurt"
2022	NCIS: Hawai'i	Dr. Laura Frost	Episode: "Lost"
2022	SEAL Team	Admiral Stevens	7 episodes
2022	The Lincoln Lawyer	Janelle Simmons	Recurring cast

== Awards and nominations ==
Year	Awards	Category	Recipient	Outcome
2004	Leo Awards	Leo Award for Best Lead Performance by a Female	"Da Vinci's Inquest"	Nominated
