= Merle Dandridge =

American actress (born 1975)

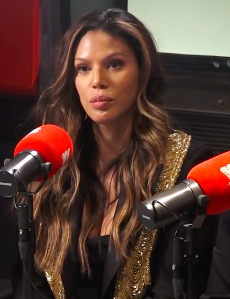
- Dandridge in 2019
- Born: May 31, 1975 (age 51); Okinawa, Japan
- Occupation: Actress
- Years active: 1994–present

Merle Dandridge (born May 31, 1975) is an American actress. She is best known for performing in Broadway musicals such as Jesus Christ Superstar, Spamalot, Rent, and Once on This Island, as well as her video game roles as Alyx Vance in Half-Life 2 and Marlene in The Last of Us franchise. She played the leading role of Grace Greenleaf in the Oprah Winfrey Network drama series, Greenleaf (2016–2020). She has had recurring roles on television series such as Sons of Anarchy and The Night Shift and starred as Kim Hammond in the first season of HBO Max comedy-drama series The Flight Attendant in 2020. In 2022, Dandridge began starring as Natasha Seo-Yeon Ross in the ABC action series Station 19. She reprised her role as Marlene in the 2023 television adaptation of The Last of Us.

== Early life and education ==
Dandridge was born in Okinawa on May 31, 1975. Dandridge's mother is Korean and her father is African-American. She moved back to the U.S. with her parents due to her father's job, and they lived at Beale Air Force Base in California before settling at Offutt Air Force Base in Bellevue, Nebraska, where Dandridge spent the majority of her childhood. She attended Papillion La Vista High School and participated in the play production class and theater department there. She then attended the Theatre Conservatory at Roosevelt University (currently called the Chicago College of Performing Arts).

== Career ==
Dandridge began her career appearing in Chicago theatre productions. She has gained a wider audience as the voice of Alyx Vance in the award-winning action game Half-Life 2 and its sequels, Episode One and Episode Two, and also as Marlene in The Last of Us. In 2006, she was cast as Kala in the original Broadway production of Tarzan. Dandridge earned a BAFTA Award for her voiceover performance in the 2015 game Everybody's Gone to the Rapture. On television, she guest starred on NCIS, 24, Criminal Minds, The Newsroom and Drop Dead Diva. In 2022, she was cast in a series regular role as Chief in the ABC drama series Station 19. Dandridge also had the recurring roles in the FX drama series, Sons of Anarchy as Rita Roosevelt, and short-lived The CW teen soap Star-Crossed in 2014. In 2015, she co-starred in the second season of NBC medical drama, The Night Shift as Gwen Gaskin.

In 2015, Dandridge was cast as the lead character in the Oprah Winfrey Network drama series, Greenleaf opposite Lynn Whitfield. She plays the role of Grace Greenleaf, Greenleaf's estranged daughter. Dandridge has received critical acclaim for her first leading screen role.

From November 9, 2017, to January 7, 2018, Dandridge starred as Papa Ge the God of Death in the Broadway musical revival of Once on This Island, at the Circle in the Square Theater. She returned to the role of Papa Ge in a limited run from June 18 to August 19, 2018. Along with cast, she received Grammy Award for Best Musical Theater Album nomination for cast recording. Also in 2018, she had a recurring role in the CBS comedy series Murphy Brown playing the role of a network boss. In 2020, Dandridge was cast in a series regular role in the eight-episode HBO Max thriller drama series The Flight Attendant. In 2021, she was cast to reprise her role as Marlene from the critically acclaimed game The Last of Us, in the HBO series of the same name. On January 9, 2025, it was announced that Dandridge would be taking over the role of Persephone in the Broadway production of Hadestown starting February 18.

In March 2026, it was announced that Dandridge joined the main cast of USA Network's legal drama series, The Rainmaker, in its second season.

== Acting credits ==
=== Film ===
| Year | Title | Role | Notes |
|---|---|---|---|
| 2008 | Nothing but the Truth | Celia | |
| 2018 | Resurrect | Alice | Short film |
| 2022 | Block Party | Crystal Maitland | |

=== Television ===
| Year | Title | Role | Notes |
|---|---|---|---|
| 2003 | Angel | Lacey Shepard | Episode: "Home" |
| 2003 | The Edge | Agent Angela Wells | Television pilot |
| 2003 | NCIS | Marcy Carruthers | Episode: "Seadog" |
| 2005 | Third Watch | Nikki | Episode: "Too Little, Too Late" |
| 2005 | All My Children | Lois | Recurring role |
| 2005 | Guiding Light | Lawyer | Episode: "July 21, 2005" |
| 2007 | I'm Paige Wilson | Gloria | Television pilot |
| 2010 | The Deep End | Jennifer Hutchins | Episode: "An Innocent Man" |
| 2010 | 24 | Kristen Smith | Episode: "Day 8, 12:00am–1:00am" |
| 2010 | Matadors | Brooke Comas | Television pilot |
| 2010 | CSI: Miami | Stacy Garrett | Episode: "Sleepless In Miami" |
| 2011 | Lie to Me | D.A. Jill Ottinger | Episode: "Saved" |
| 2011 | Love Bites | Krista | Episode: "How To..." |
| 2011 | Ringer | Dr. Anabel Morris | Episode: "Shut Up and Eat Your Bologna" |
| 2011–2012 | Sons of Anarchy | Rita Roosevelt | 6 episodes |
| 2012 | Criminal Minds | Agent Lynn Brooks | Episode: "A Family Affair" |
| 2012–2013 | The Newsroom | Maria Guerrero | 2 episodes |
| 2013 | Company Town | Louise | Television pilot |
| 2013 | Nikita | Zoe | Episode: "Inevitability" |
| 2014 | The Mentalist | Lydia Faulk | Episode: "Il Tavolo Bianco" |
| 2014 | Star-Crossed | Vega | 7 episodes |
| 2014 | Drop Dead Diva | Nadine Comer | Episode: "Afterlife" |
| 2014 | Stalker | Dean Lisa Miner | Episode: "Pilot" |
| 2014 | NCIS: Los Angeles | CIA Officer Nicole Borders | Episode: "Reign Fall" |
| 2015 | Perception | Robyn Sherman | Episode: "Meat" |
| 2015 | Suits | Leah | Episode: "Intent" |
| 2015 | Rosewood | Charlotte | Episode: "Vitamins and Vandals" |
| 2015–2016 | The Night Shift | Gwen Gaskin | 15 episodes |
| 2016–2020 | Greenleaf | Grace Greenleaf | 60 episodes |
| 2018 | Murphy Brown | Diana Macomber | 5 episodes |
| 2020 | The Flight Attendant | Kim Hammond | 8 episodes |
| 2021 | Truth Be Told | Zarina Killebrew | 20 episodes |
| 2022–2024 | Station 19 | Fire Chief Natasha Ross | Recurring (season 5); Series regular (seasons 6–7); 38 episodes |
| 2023 | The Last of Us | Marlene | 2 episodes |
| 2023–2024 | Alice's Wonderland Bakery | The Silver Queen (voice) | 6 episodes |
| 2024 | Secret Level | Liz Mutton (voice) | Episode: "Spelunky: Tally" |
| 2026 | The Comeback | Ridley Macintosh | 3 episodes |
| 2026 | Citadel | Joana Malvern | 7 episodes |
| 2026 | Life, Larry and the Pursuit of Unhappiness | Clementine | Episode: "Deepthroat" |

=== Stage ===
| Year | Title | Role | Theatre |
|---|---|---|---|
| 1994 | Once on This Island | Performer | Chicago |
| 1994 | The Robber Bridegroom | Rosamund | Roosevelt University, Chicago |
| 1994 | As You Like It | Rosalind | Roosevelt University, Chicago |
| 1996 | Passion | | Pegasus Players, Chicago |
| 1997 | Balm in Gilead | Ann | Gilead Theatre, Chicago |
| 1997 | The Kentucky Cycle | Performer | Pegasus Players, Chicago |
| 1997 | Company | Kathy | Pegasus Players, Chicago |
| 1997 | Sweet and Hot | Performer | Theatre Building, Chicago |
| 1998 | Heart and Soul | Andrea | Chicago |
| 1998 | Richard II | Performer | Gilead Theatre Company, Chicago |
| 1998 | Ain't Misbehavin' | Charlaine | European tour |
| 1998 | Smokey Joe's Cafe | Swing | National tour |
| 2000 | Jesus Christ Superstar | Mary Magdalene | Ford Center for the Performing Arts, Broadway |
| 2001 | Aida | Nehebka | National tour |
| 2002 | Aida | Aida (Replacement) | Palace Theatre, Broadway |
| 2002–2008 | Rent | Joanne Jefferson (replacement) | Nederlander Theatre, Broadway |
| 2003 | Showtune: Celebrating the Words & Music of Jerry Herman | Woman 2 | Pasadena Playhouse, Pasadena |
| 2006–2007 | Tarzan | Kala | Richard Rodgers Theatre, Broadway |
| 2007 | Atlanta | Cleo | Geffen Playhouse |
| 2008 | Spamalot | The Lady of the Lake | Shubert Theatre, Broadway |
| 2009–2010 | Rent | Joanne | U.S. tour |
| 2012 | By the Way, Meet Vera Stark | Anna Mae/Afua Assata Ejobo | Geffen Playhouse |
| 2015 | Spamalot | The Lady of the Lake | Hollywood Bowl, Los Angeles |
| 2017–2018 | Once on This Island | Papa Ge | Circle in the Square Theatre, Broadway |
| 2020 | Joseph and the Amazing Technicolor Dreamcoat | Pharaoh | David Geffen Hall |
| 2023 | A Little Night Music | Desirée Armfeldt | Pasadena Playhouse, Pasadena |
| 2025 | Hadestown | Persephone | Walter Kerr Theater, Broadway |

=== Video games ===
| Year | Title | Role | Notes |
|---|---|---|---|
| 2004 | Half-Life 2 | Alyx Vance | |
| 2006 | Half-Life 2: Episode One | Alyx Vance | |
| 2007 | Half-Life 2: Episode Two | Alyx Vance | |
| 2007 | The Orange Box | Alyx Vance | |
| 2013 | The Last of Us | Marlene | Also provided motion capture |
| 2013 | Dota 2 | Legion Commander / Winter Wyvern | |
| 2015 | Everybody's Gone to the Rapture | Kate Collins | Won–BAFTA for Best Performer |
| 2016 | Uncharted 4: A Thief's End | Evelyn / Sister Catherine | |
| 2020 | The Last of Us Part II | Marlene | |
| 2021 | Hitman 3 | Civilian Female 03 | |
| 2023 | Stray Gods: The Roleplaying Musical | Aphrodite | |

== Awards and nominations ==
| Year | Award | Category | Nominated work | Result | Ref. |
|---|---|---|---|---|---|
| 2016 | British Academy Games Awards | Performer | Everybody's Gone to the Rapture | Won | |
| 2019 | Grammy Awards | Best Musical Theater Album | Once on This Island | Nominated | |
| 2021 | Screen Actors Guild Awards | Outstanding Performance by an Ensemble in a Comedy Series | The Flight Attendant | Nominated | |
