= Good Mourning (Grey's Anatomy) =

- Grey's Anatomy episode
- Episode no.: Season 6 Episode 1
- Directed by: Ed Ornelas
- Written by: Krista Vernoff
- Original air date: September 24, 2009
- Running time: 43 minutes

Guest appearances
- Shannon Lucio as Amanda; Mitch Pileggi as Larry Jennings; Debra Monk as Louise O'Malley; Zoe Boyle as Clara Ferguson

Episode chronology
| ← Previous "Now or Never" | Next → "Goodbye" |
- Grey's Anatomy season 6

"Good Mourning" is the first episode and the season premiere of the sixth season of the American television medical drama Grey's Anatomy, and the show's 103rd episode overall. Written by Krista Vernoff and directed by Ed Ornelas, the episode aired on the American Broadcasting Company (ABC) in the United States on September 24, 2009.

In the episode, the doctors of Seattle Grace Hospital grapple with the shocking revelation that a dead John Doe is actually their beloved co-worker George O'Malley (T. R. Knight). Other storylines include Izzie Stevens' (Katherine Heigl) recovering from her near-death experience, and Callie Torres (Sara Ramirez) and Izzie debating whether to donate O'Malley's organs. Meanwhile, Derek Shepherd (Patrick Dempsey) is offered the position of Chief of Surgery, a role currently held by Richard Webber (James Pickens, Jr.).

Although the episode was fictionally set in Seattle, Washington, filming took place in Los Angeles, California. The episode is the first part of a two-hour season premiere, followed by "Goodbye". It marks the first episode without Knight following his departure from the series and the first to feature Jessica Capshaw (Arizona Robbins) as a series regular. Guest stars include Mitch Pileggi, Debra Monk, Shannon Lucio and Zoe Boyle.

Upon its original broadcast, "Good Mourning" was watched by 17.03 million viewers in the United States, ranking #1 for the night, and earned a 6.7/17 Nielsen rating/share in the 18–49 demographic. The episode received positive reviews from television critics, with Ramirez's performance receiving high praise.

== Plot ==
The episode opens with a voice-over narration from Meredith Grey (Ellen Pompeo) explaining the Kübler-Ross model, also known as the five stages of grief.

The doctors at Seattle Grace are dealing with the aftermath of George O'Malley (T. R. Knight) being declared brain dead following his injuries from being hit by a bus. Meanwhile, Izzie Stevens (Katherine Heigl), who flatlined at the end of the Season 5 finale, has been revived. Callie Torres (Sara Ramirez), George’s ex-wife, is devastated by the news of his death and suffers an emotional breakdown. The situation becomes even more challenging when it is revealed that George's organ donor status is unknown, leading Richard Webber (James Pickens, Jr.), the Chief of Surgery, to call George's mother, Louise (Debra Monk), to make the decision.

Stevens, still recovering from her near-death experience, remains unaware of George's death, and her husband, Alex Karev (Justin Chambers), decides not to tell her immediately, fearing it could negatively impact her recovery. Pediatric surgeon Arizona Robbins (Jessica Capshaw) is introduced to a patient complaining of body pain, which she initially diagnoses as growing pains.

As George's mother arrives at the hospital, she asks Torres to make the difficult decision regarding the donation of George's organs. Meanwhile, a speedboat accident victim, Clara Ferguson (Zoe Boyle), is brought into the hospital with multiple amputations, and plastic surgeon Mark Sloan (Eric Dane) informs her that they may be able to reattach her severed limbs. Hospital president Larry Jennings (Mitch Pileggi) approaches Derek Shepherd (Patrick Dempsey) with an offer to take over as Chief of Surgery, citing Webber’s recent shortcomings in the role.

After learning about George's death, Stevens is devastated, but she joins Torres in deciding to donate George’s organs, believing he would have wanted to help others. As preparations for organ donation begin, Miranda Bailey (Chandra Wilson), George's former mentor, struggles to accept the loss but eventually comes to terms with it.

At George's funeral, the woman O'Malley saved, Amanda (Shannon Lucio) is shown hysterically crying, while Meredith, Cristina Yang (Sandra Oh), Karev, and Stevens, awkwardly laugh and joke, unable to process their true emotions. Lexie Grey (Chyler Leigh), George’s close friend and colleague, is tasked with clearing out his locker, but breaks down in grief. After the funeral, Bailey discharges Stevens from the hospital, and Robbins is left perplexed when her young patient returns with chronic pain that she cannot diagnose.

Torres is frustrated when she learns that her application for an attending surgeon position has been denied because the surgeon who was supposed to retire decided to stay. Feeling underappreciated, Torres vents her anger to Webber, declaring herself a "superstar". The episode concludes with Lexie comforting Clara Ferguson, the speedboat victim, as she faces her recovery.

== Production ==
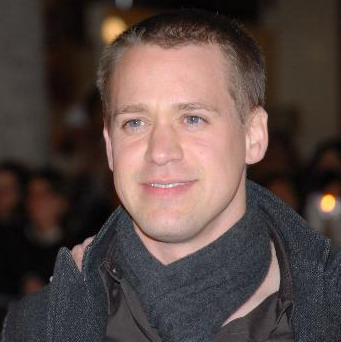
"Good Mourning" is the first episode T. R. Knight did not appear in.

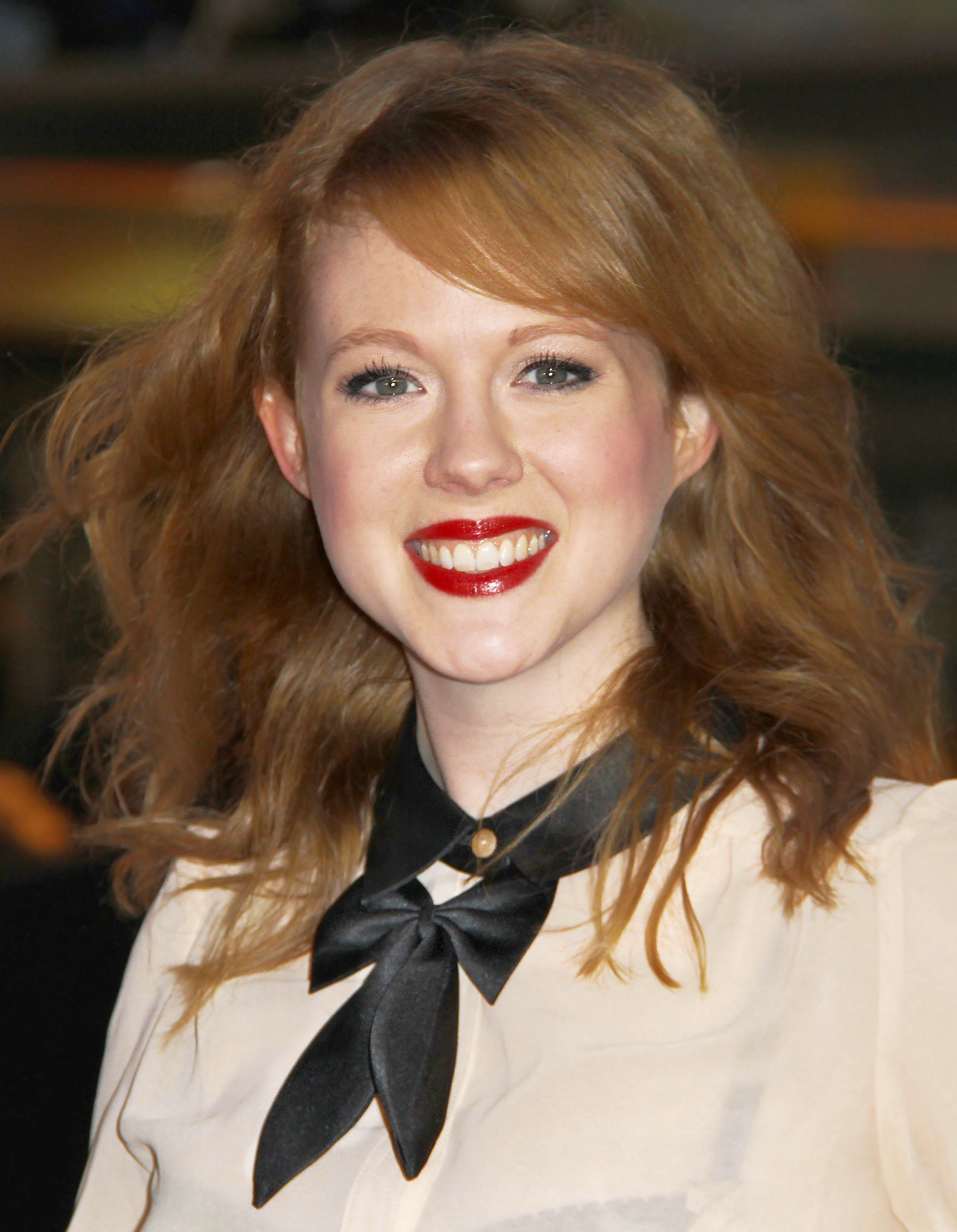
Zoe Boyle portrayed Clara Ferguson.

"Good Mourning" was written by Krista Vernoff and directed by Ed Ornelas. Joe Mitacek served as editor, while Donald Lee Harris was the production designer for the episode. Featured music includes Sweet Honey in the Rock's "Wade In The Water" and Joy Williams's "Speaking A Dead Language". This episode marked the first absence of T. R. Knight's character, George O'Malley, following his character's death. Knight was released from his contract at the end of Season 5 due to disagreements with series creator Shonda Rhimes over the lack of screen time for O'Malley. When asked to make a flashback appearance in Season 6, Knight declined.

Vernoff shared her perspective on O'Malley's death: "It's heartbreaking. I fell in love with George, like many of you did, in Season 1. He was impulsive, big-hearted, and yeah, it's that heart that had him jump in front of a moving bus to save a life. It's a devastating end to a beloved character, but I would argue with anyone who said it wasn't a fitting end". In the episode, Derek Shepherd (Patrick Dempsey) is offered the role of Chief of Surgery but postpones his decision out of loyalty to his friend Richard Webber (James Pickens, Jr.). Vernoff offered her insight on this:

"Derek was pretty freakin' noble. So noble! Cause you KNOW how much he wants that job. It was the promise of the Chiefdom that brought him to Seattle from NYC to begin with. And right here, the job was his for the taking. And out of loyalty and friendship, he went to [Webber] and warned him."

— Krista Vernoff, Grey Matter

One of Vernoff’s favorite scenes from the episode was the moment when O'Malley's colleagues laugh at his funeral. Reflecting on the scene, Vernoff noted: "Shonda gave me smart notes that enhanced the writing, and then the wonderful director Ed Ornelas and the amazing DP Herb Davis, along with the entire crew, made it visually beautiful. And then the actors… damn, did they all bring their A game to this scene. It's a collaboration. What it takes to make good TV is a huge coming together of a great many artists. What it takes to make great TV is all that plus a little magic and a little luck. And that’s what I feel like we had with this scene. It's so funny and so bittersweet and so, so sad".

== Release ==
Aired back-to-back with the following episode, "Goodbye", as part of a 2-hour season premiere special, "Good Mourning" was originally broadcast on September 24, 2009 on the American Broadcasting Company (ABC) in the United States. The episode attracted a total of 17.04 million viewers during its 9:00 PM Eastern time-slot. It became the series' second least-viewed season premiere at that time, only outperforming the Season 1 premiere, "A Hard Day's Night". Compared to the previous episode, it saw a 0.08% drop in viewership. Despite this slight decrease, the episode ranked first in both its time-slot and across the entire night, surpassing CBS's juggernaut CSI: Crime Scene Investigation.

In terms of ratings, "Good Mourning" achieved a 6.7/17 Nielsen rating, placing it first in both rating and share percentages for the 18–49 demographic. The episode also earned a 10.9/18 rating in the 18–34 demographic, outperforming CBS's The Mentalist and securing the #1 spot in both ratings and shares for the demographic.

== Reception ==
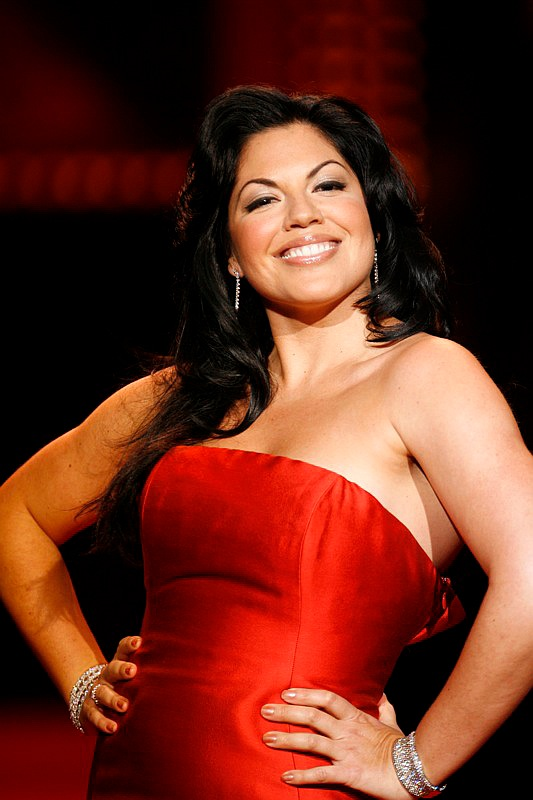
Sara Ramirez's performance as Callie Torres was highly praised by several critics.

"Good Mourning" received positive reviews from television critics, with Sara Ramirez's performance as Callie Torres receiving high praise.

Alan Sepinwall of NJ.com commented on the decision to air the two episodes together, stating: "I keep going back and forth on whether it was a good idea to do that, or if we'd have been better off spacing out the tearful speeches over two weeks. That isn't to say there shouldn't have been tears, or speeches. George O'Malley's (T. R. Knight) death, no matter how marginal he had become last season, is and should be a huge event in the lives of these characters." He noted that rushing through the Kubler-Ross model of grief would have felt disingenuous, but criticized the pacing: "When you put two episodes back-to-back, those rhythms—the pace at which the acts build to emotional crescendos and then briefly recede—start to become too predictable, and it sucks some of the life and emotion away." Sepinwall praised the performances of Chandra Wilson (Miranda Bailey), Ramirez (Torres), and Justin Chambers (Alex Karev), and highlighted the funeral scene for its bittersweet and humorous tone, especially the laughter during O'Malley's funeral.

Michael Pascua of HuffPost also praised Ramirez's performance, calling her "the most genuine character". However, Pascua was critical of other elements of the episode, particularly the handling of the funeral scene, writing: "The funeral wasn't as sad as I thought it would be. There were so many pre-episode pictures up that I thought the funeral would take up half the show, then it was five minutes and it wasn't sad at all. The core group walked away and Izzie Stevens (Katherine Heigl) spread the giggles. She laughs at the fact that she has cancer, like this was all some really badly-written show. Oh wait, it is!"

Kelly West of TV Blend was also critical, writing: "I don't think based on the first episode that we can say that Grey's is headed in a new direction, nor do I think the writers are making much of an effort to bring the series back to the greatness of its earlier seasons." West added that despite these concerns, the season premiere still featured the usual drama, romance, and medical mysteries that kept the show engaging for its core audience.

Glenn Diaz of BuddyTV noted that the two-part premiere foreshadowed a "very dark" season, highlighting the conversation between Louise O'Malley (Debra Monk), George's mother and Torres as one of the most heart-wrenching moments of an already emotionally charged episode.
