= Goodbye (Grey's Anatomy) =

- Grey's Anatomy episode
- Episode no.: Season 6 Episode 2
- Directed by: Bill D'Elia
- Written by: Krista Vernoff
- Original air date: September 24, 2009
- Running time: 43 minutes

Guest appearances
- Shannon Lucio as Amanda; Amy Madigan as Dr. Wyatt; Martha Plimpton as Pam Michaelson; Zack Shada as Andy Michaelson; Mitch Pileggi as Larry Jennings; Zoe Boyle as Clara Ferguson

Episode chronology
← Previous "Good Mourning"	Next → "I Always Feel Like Somebody's Watchin' Me"
- Grey's Anatomy season 6

"Goodbye" is the second episode of the sixth season of the American television medical drama Grey's Anatomy, and the show's 104th episode overall. Written by Krista Vernoff and directed by Bill D'Elia, the episode was originally broadcast on the American Broadcasting Company (ABC) in the United States on September 24, 2009.

In the episode, the doctors of Seattle Grace Hospital come to terms with the death of their colleague George O'Malley (T. R. Knight). Additional storylines include Richard Webber (James Pickens, Jr.) being involved in a car accident, Callie Torres (Sara Ramirez) receiving a job offer as an attending physician at a nearby hospital, and Alex Karev (Justin Chambers) struggling with his marriage to Izzie Stevens (Katherine Heigl) following her near-death experience.

Although the episode was fictionally set in Seattle, Washington, filming took place in Los Angeles, California. The episode is the second part of the two-hour season premiere, the first part being "Good Mourning". It marks the first episode without Knight following his departure from the series and the first to feature Jessica Capshaw (Arizona Robbins) as a series regular. Guest stars included Shannon Lucio, Amy Madigan, Martha Plimpton, Zack Shada, Mitch Pileggi, and Zoe Boyle.

Upon its original broadcast, "Goodbye" was viewed by 17.03 million people in the United States, ranking #1 for the night, and garnered a 6.7/17 Nielsen rating/share in the 18–49 demographic. The episode received positive reviews from television critics, with high praise for the performances of Ramirez and Chyler Leigh (Lexie Grey).

== Plot ==
The episode opens with a voice-over narration by the entire cast explaining the Kübler-Ross model, also known as the five stages of grief. It also focuses on the unpredictability of grief and the importance of allowing oneself to feel and heal through its stages.

Cristina Yang (Sandra Oh) and Owen Hunt (Kevin McKidd) attending couples therapy with the hospital's psychiatrist, Katherine Wyatt (Amy Madigan). They are advised to refrain from sexual activity until they have worked through their emotional issues, a challenge they find difficult to navigate. Meanwhile, Clara Ferguson (Zoe Boyle), a patient who has been receiving care from Lexie Grey (Chyler Leigh), shows signs of recovery from her depression and encourages Lexie to return home.

However, Ferguson’s depression resurfaces when Miranda Bailey (Chandra Wilson) informs her that she has developed an infection that will require surgery. Her mood worsens when Cristina informs her that she may need an ostomy pouch, further complicating her outlook. Arizona Robbins (Jessica Capshaw) and Alex Karev (Justin Chambers) encounter a chronic pain patient, Andy Michaelson (Zack Shada), and his mother, Pam (Martha Plimpton). They order a 3D MRI, but the request is denied by Chief of Surgery Richard Webber (James Pickens Jr.).

On his way to a meeting, Webber runs a red light and is involved in a car accident, resulting in his being T-boned. He is taken to Mercy West Hospital, where his former colleague Callie Torres (Sara Ramirez) treats him before he is discharged. Meanwhile, Ferguson eventually agrees to undergo surgery after repeated pleas from Lexie, and begins physical therapy. Lexie returns home, only to find her sister Meredith Grey (Ellen Pompeo) and her new husband, Derek Shepherd (Patrick Dempsey), having sex in the kitchen.

At home, Izzie Stevens (Katherine Heigl) pleads with Alex to spend time with her, but he dismisses her. Meanwhile, at Mark Sloan’s (Eric Dane) apartment, Lexie has moved in, but tension arises when Sloan’s ex-girlfriend Callie walks in on him in the shower. Lexie expresses her discomfort, and Callie apologizes. Arizona confronts Derek about running an expensive test to diagnose Andy, which ultimately reveals he has tethered spinal cord syndrome. The surgery proves to be successful.

Later, Izzie encounters Amanda (Shannon Lucio), the woman George O'Malley (T. R. Knight) saved, sitting outside the hospital. Izzie tells her to move on with her life, reminding her that George didn’t save her so she could remain miserable. In the final moments of the episode, Izzie reconciles with Karev, while Webber announces that Seattle Grace will be merging with Mercy West, marking the beginning of a new chapter for the hospital.

== Production ==
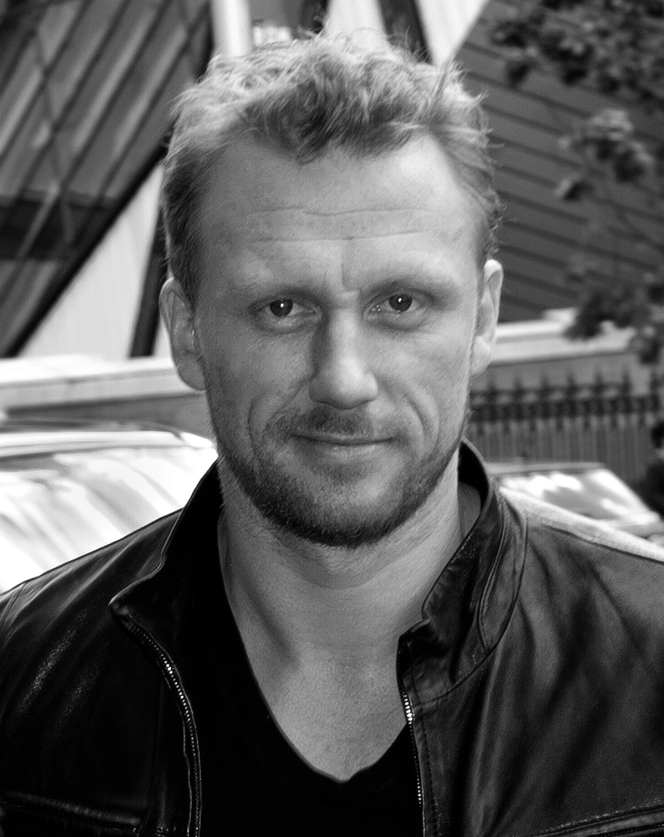
Krista Vernoff informed Kevin McKidd (pictured) that the therapy scene would change, 20 minutes before filming.

"Goodbye" was written by Krista Vernoff and directed by Bill D'Elia. The episode was edited by Joe Mitacek, with Donald Lee Harris serving as the production designer. Featured music includes Fanfarlo's "Ghosts", Katie Herzig's "Hologram", Lucy Schwartz's "Gravity", and Emilíana Torrini's "Today Has Been OK". Notably, "Today Has Been OK" plays during the scene in which Derek Shepherd (Patrick Dempsey) consoles Miranda Bailey (Chandra Wilson) about George O'Malley's (T. R. Knight) death in the elevator, a callback to the same song used in the Season 2 episode, "Into You Like a Train", when Bailey consoled Shepherd. This is the only instance in the series where a song has been reused.

The episode served as the second hour of the two-part Season 6 premiere, marking the first premiere not to feature Knight’s character, O'Malley. Knight had been released from his contract at the conclusion of Season 5 following a disagreement with series creator Shonda Rhimes over his character’s lack of screen time. Knight was offered the chance to make a flashback appearance in Season 6, which he declined.

The scene featuring Cristina Yang (Sandra Oh) and Owen Hunt (Kevin McKidd) in couples therapy was initially conceived as a comedic moment. Vernoff revealed that the scene was handed to the actors just 20 minutes before filming. However, after smart questions from Oh and McKidd, it became clear that the scene required more emotional weight, transforming it into a pivotal moment that reflected the depth of their storyline.

In the episode, Meredith Grey (Ellen Pompeo) copes with her grief over George's death by engaging in constant sex with Shepherd. Vernoff noted that she appreciated Meredith’s self-awareness in realizing her coping mechanism. By the conclusion of "Goodbye", Yang comes to terms with O'Malley's death, bringing emotional closure to her character. Vernoff offered her insight:

"Cristina, who as a young child, held her father’s heart in her hands as it stopped beating, is perhaps the least "processed" of our core group, the least "healthy," the least able to handle the impact of George’s sudden death. Mer is using sex, Cristina is using her frustration around her lack of sex. So when she finally gets in bed with Owen and she finally has the tension release that comes with that kind of, um… tension release… She can’t hold the truth off anymore. That’s the thing about the five stages of grief. They truly are different for everyone. Cristina clung to the Denial stage for 40 days. And then she let in the fact that George died. And as much as Mer’s tears got to me, that intake of breath from Cristina got to me even more. The sudden realization that George really did…die.

— Krista Vernoff, Grey Matter

== Release ==
Aired back-to-back with the previous episode, "Good Mourning", as part of a 2-hour season premiere special, "Goodbye" was originally broadcast on September 24, 2009 on the American Broadcasting Company (ABC) in the United States. The episode was viewed by 17.04 million Americans during its two-hour 9:00 PM Eastern time-slot. At the time, it was the series' second least-viewed season premiere, just ahead of the Season 1 premiere, "A Hard Day's Night". Despite a slight 0.08% decrease in viewership compared to the previous episode, "Goodbye" still ranked first in its time-slot and for the entire night, outperforming CBS's CSI: Crime Scene Investigation.

In terms of ratings, "Goodbye" also performed well, achieving a 6.7/17 Nielsen rating, ranking first in its time-slot and overall for the night in the 18-49 demographic. Additionally, the episode garnered a 10.9/18 rating in the 18-34 demographic, beating out CBS's The Mentalist and securing the top spot in ratings and share for the demographic.

== Reception ==
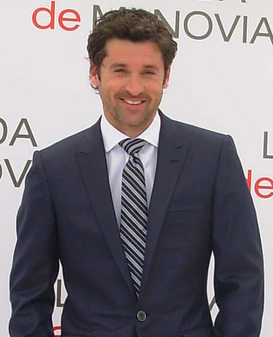
Patrick Dempsey's performance as Derek Shepherd was praised.

"Goodbye" received positive reviews from television critics, with high praise for the performances of Sara Ramirez (Callie Torres) and Chyler Leigh (Lexie Grey).

Alan Sepinwall of NJ.com commented on the two episodes being combined into one week: "I keep going back and forth on whether it was a good idea to do that, or if we'd have been better off spacing out the tearful speeches over two weeks. That isn't to say that there shouldn't have been tears, or speeches. George's death, despite how marginal he had become last season, is, and should be, a significant event in the lives of these characters. Rushing through Elizabeth Kubler-Ross's 5 stages of grief would have felt false, as if everyone involved in the show was in a hurry to move past the events of the uneven fifth season. My issue is that when you put two episodes back-to-back, the rhythms—the pace at which the acts build to emotional crescendos and then briefly recede—start to become too predictable, which drains some of the life and emotion away." Sepinwall also praised the performances of Ramirez, Chandra Wilson (Miranda Bailey) and Justin Chambers (Alex Karev) for their performances.

Michael Pascua of HuffPost praised Patrick Dempsey's portrayal of Derek Shepherd in comparison to his performance in "Good Mourning", writing: "Derek was developed as a real character in the second half, not just a one-sided 'McDreamy.' First, Arizona Robbins (Jessica Capshaw) and Derek finally solved the issue with Andy, and the two had some authentic interaction. Derek confronted Alex about his problems with Izzie Stevens (Katherine Heigl), took a moment to speak with Mark about the hospital's situation, and ended the episode by confronting a very tense Bailey. Miraculously, he also found time to have a lot of sex with Meredith." Pascua also appreciated Leigh's performance, noting: "Lexie continued to evolve. I loved the anxiety she had with Callie. She wasn't really a doctor in any traditional sense in this episode, just a friend to lean on." Despite enjoying most of the episode, Pascua had mixed feelings about Izzie, attributing it to his personal dislike of Heigl.
