= Tainted Obligation =

- Grey's Anatomy episode
- Alex Karev (Justin Chambers) screaming after his confrontation with a bear.
- Episode no.: Season 6 Episode 4
- Directed by: Tom Verica
- Written by: Jenna Bans
- Original air date: October 8, 2009
- Running time: 43 minutes

Guest appearances
- Jeff Perry as Thatcher Grey; Ralph Waite as Irving Weller; Jocko Sims as Randy

Episode chronology
← Previous "I Always Feel Like Somebody's Watchin' Me"	Next → "Invasion"
- Grey's Anatomy season 6

"Tainted Obligation" is the fourth episode of the sixth season of the American television medical drama Grey's Anatomy, and the 106th episode overall. Written by Jenna Bans and directed by Tom Verica, the episode aired on the American Broadcasting Company (ABC) in the United States on October 8, 2009.

The episode focuses on Meredith Grey (Ellen Pompeo) and Lexie Grey (Chyler Leigh) as their father, Thatcher Grey (Jeff Perry), is admitted to the hospital in need of a liver transplant. Meanwhile, Cristina Yang (Sandra Oh) worries about losing her job, and Owen Hunt (Kevin McKidd) works with Izzie Stevens (Katherine Heigl) on a challenging surgery for a terminal patient.

Although the episode was fictionally set in Seattle, Washington, filming primarily took place in Los Angeles, California. Perry reprised his role as a guest star, while Ralph Waite and Jocko Sims made their first appearances. The title of the episode refers to the song "Tainted Obligation" by the American alternative rock group Community Trolls.

Upon its initial airing, "Tainted Obligation" was viewed by 14.13 million Americans, and garnered a 5.4/14 Nielsen rating/share in the 18–49 demographic, ranking #3 for the night in terms of viewership. It received positive reviews from television critics, with high praise for the performances of Pompeo and Leigh.

== Plot ==
The episode opens with a voice-over from Meredith Grey (Ellen Pompeo), reflecting on life's increasing obligations and the inevitability of facing them.

Alex Karev (Justin Chambers) leaves his trailer for work and encounters a bear growling outside. He expresses his desire to move back into Meredith's house, but Izzie Stevens (Katherine Heigl) insists they must move forward with their lives. Meanwhile, Lexie Grey (Chyler Leigh) brings her father, Thatcher Grey (Jeff Perry), to the emergency room, where Miranda Bailey (Chandra Wilson) discovers he needs a liver transplant. Mark Sloan (Eric Dane) admits an elderly patient, Irving Waller (Ralph Waite), who, after revealing he wants a penile implant, receives the procedure.

Cristina Yang (Sandra Oh), fearful of being cut from the hospital staff, seeks to secure her place on the surgical board, while Callie Torres (Sara Ramirez) struggles with nerves about asking Richard Webber (James Pickens Jr.) for an attending surgeon position. Callie seeks support from her girlfriend, Arizona Robbins (Jessica Capshaw).

As Izzie and Owen Hunt (Kevin McKidd) operate on Randy (Jocko Sims), a terminal cancer patient, complications arise, leading to his death. Hunt criticizes Izzie for the surgery's failure. Meanwhile, Lexie is unable to donate part of her liver to Thatcher, prompting her to ask Meredith, who agrees to undergo the procedure, ultimately resulting in a successful transplant. Cristina confronts Webber about the need for a cardiothoracic surgeon, declaring that if one isn't hired, she should be cut from the program.

At the end of the episode, Izzie sees the bear again and ultimately agrees with Alex that they should move out of the forest and start anew.

== Production ==
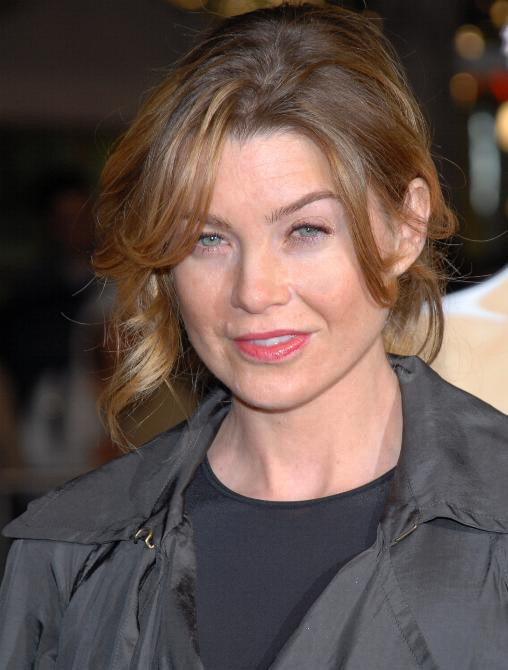
The episode put an emphasis on the development of Ellen Pompeo's character, Meredith Grey.

The episode was written by Jenna Bans and directed by Tom Verica, with Edward Ornelas as editor and Donald Lee Harris as production designer. The title refers to the song "Tainted Obligation" by the American alternative rock group Community Trolls. Featured music includes The Voluntary Butler Scheme's "Trading Things In" and Dragonette's "Come On Be Good". During filming, Ellen Pompeo’s pregnancy required adjustments.

In the episode, Lexie Grey (Chyler Leigh) advocates for Meredith Grey (Pompeo) to donate her liver, as she is unable to. Bans explained Lexie's motivation, emphasizing that family is a gift to Lexie, not an obligation. The scene where Meredith offers her liver to Thatcher was originally meant to rekindle their relationship. Bans later changed this, following a request from Pompeo, and offered her insight:

"I thought I wrote a reconciliation story – between Mer and her father. I thought I wrote the episode that was going to put all the bad blood behind them for good. And it did, in a way – Mer tells Thatcher the door is open, which is pretty huge. And though it was incredibly hard for her to work up the courage to say that to him, she knew it was the only thing that would let him – or alleviate his guilt enough - to allow her to save his life. But something happened in this story during the shooting process. It changed – subtly, but substantially. Here's how it started -- Ellen Pompeo came to me on the first day of shooting and wanting to change that speech she gives to Thatcher. She wanted to add a simple line, to have Mer say 'I want you to do this for her.' Because for Ellen, this story wasn't a Mer/Thatcher reconciliation story – it was a Mer/Lexie story. It was a story about these two women, who have done this awkward dance around each other for two seasons now, finally becoming sisters. Ellen insisted that her main reason for doing what she does, for being completely vulnerable in front of the man who has hurt her in more ways than we can count at this point, was Lexie. She was doing it for Lexie."

— Jenna Bans, Grey Matter

Bans called Waller’s storyline, where he receives a new penis, the most emotional scene she had to write, explaining, "I loved this story because I hate the idea that once you're old, your life is over. I hate when people treat their aging parents like old furniture they want to get rid of but have to find a place for."

Bans also commented on Izzie Stevens' (Katherine Heigl) storyline, saying, "Poor Izzie. She’s living with cancer, lost her best friend, impulsively got married, and moved to the woods. By the end of the episode, after Owen tells her that using her patient experience is undermining her as a doctor, she’s wondering if she returned to work too soon. Every doctor wants to believe all their terminal patients can be Izzie, but the odds tell a different story."

== Release ==
"Tainted Obligation" was originally broadcast on October 8, 2009, in the United States on the American Broadcasting Company (ABC). The episode was viewed by 14.13 million Americans, a 1.56% decrease from the previous episode, "I Always Feel Like Somebody's Watchin' Me", which garnered 15.69 million viewers. Despite ranking #3 in overall viewership for the night, behind CBS's juggernauts CSI and The Mentalist, "Tainted Obligation" ranked first in its 9:00 PM Eastern time slot with a 5.4/14 Nielsen rating in the key 18–49 demographic, beating shows like CSI, The Mentalist, Private Practice, and The Office. However, this was a decrease from the previous episode's 6.1/16 rating/share in the same demographic.

== Reception ==
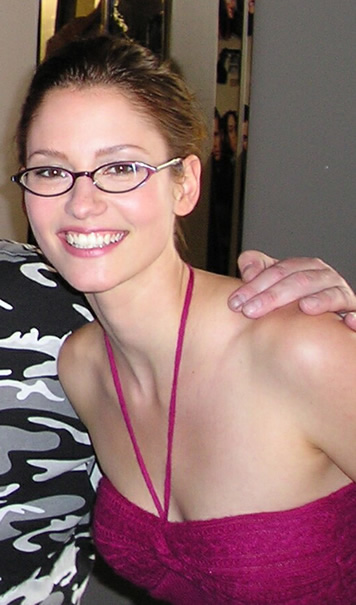
Chyler Leigh's performance as Lexie Grey in the episode received positive reviews.

"Tainted Obligation" received positive reviews from television critics upon telecast, with high praise for the performances of Ellen Pompeo (Meredith Grey) and Chyler Leigh (Lexie Grey).

Glenn Diaz of BuddyTV praised Jeff Perry's character, Thatcher, calling him "the man of the hour," and commended Pompeo's performance, noting, "You gotta love Mer when she's gloomy." He also found Cristina Yang (Sandra Oh) not having a surgery "hilarious" and praised the chemistry between Callie Torres (Sara Ramirez) and Arizona Robbins (Jessica Capshaw).

PopSugar found the episode title fitting and applauded Pompeo's performance, stating they were proud of Meredith's growth, especially in putting Lexie first and offering to donate her liver. They also appreciated Oh's vulnerable side, though they felt the episode was overall "lackluster".

Cinema Blend’s Amanda Krill criticized Cristina's character as "babyish" and "whiny," while TV Guide’s Adam Bryant called the bear scene "one of the funniest moments on TV that week." He also praised the honesty in the Callie-Arizona storyline and highlighted Leigh's performance, despite feeling her speech to Meredith was "a little overwritten." Bryant appreciated the growing bond between Meredith and Lexie, calling it "nice to see."

Michael Pascua of HuffPost gave the episode a positive review, praising how Grey’s Anatomy balanced serious and comedic moments, such as Alex's bear encounter and the old man's penile implant request. Pascua also highlighted Leigh's performance and the well-written storyline of Ralph Waite's character, Irving Waller.
