= I Always Feel Like Somebody's Watchin' Me =

- Grey's Anatomy episode
- Izzie Stevens wearing a cancer wig.
- Episode no.: Season 6 Episode 3
- Directed by: Michael Pressman
- Written by: Tony Phelan; Joan Rater
- Original air date: October 1, 2009
- Running time: 43 minutes

Guest appearances
- Adrienne Barbeau as Jodie Crawley; James Frain as Tom Crawley; Sarah Utterback as Olivia Harper; Mark Saul as Dr. Steve Mostow; Molly Kidder as Intern Megan

Episode chronology
← Previous "Goodbye"	Next → "Tainted Obligation"
- Grey's Anatomy season 6

"I Always Feel Like Somebody's Watchin' Me" is the third episode of the sixth season of the American television medical drama Grey's Anatomy, and the show's 105th episode overall. Written by Tony Phelan and Joan Rater, and directed by Michael Pressman, the episode originally aired on the American Broadcasting Company (ABC) in the United States on October 1, 2009.

The episode focuses on the physicians of Seattle Grace as they struggle to secure their positions during the hospital's merger with Mercy West. Additional storylines include Izzie Stevens (Katherine Heigl) returning to work prematurely after her surgery, and Cristina Yang (Sandra Oh) adjusting to working under Arizona Robbins (Jessica Capshaw).

Though fictionally set in Seattle, Washington, the episode was filmed primarily in Los Angeles, California. Adrienne Barbeau and James Frain made their first guest appearances, while Sarah Utterback, Mark Saul and Molly Kidder reprised their roles as guest stars. The episode's title refers to the songs "I Always Feel Like", by American hip hop group TRU, and "Somebody's Watchin' Me", by Rockwell (ft. Michael Jackson).

Upon its initial broadcast, "I Always Feel Like Somebody's Watchin' Me" was watched by 15.69 million viewers in the United States and garnered a 6.1/16 Nielsen rating in the 18–49 demographic, ranking No. 3 in viewership for the night. The episode received positive reviews from critics, with Oh and Chyler Leigh's (Lexie Grey) performances receiving high praise.

== Plot ==
The episode opens with a voice-over narration from Meredith Grey (Ellen Pompeo) about the challenges of uncertainty and the looming changes at Seattle Grace Hospital.

Cristina Yang (Sandra Oh) is determined to secure a position in pediatric surgery and convinces Arizona Robbins (Jessica Capshaw) to let her join her service. Meanwhile, the hospital is filled with tension as the doctors and residents try to impress their superiors, hoping to survive the impending merger with Mercy West. Izzie Stevens (Katherine Heigl) returns to work full-time, despite still recovering from her cancer treatment, wearing an auburn wig to conceal her hair loss.

Lexie Grey (Chyler Leigh) is tasked with transferring blood to the OR for a trauma patient but slips while rushing through the hospital. At the same time, Derek Shepherd (Patrick Dempsey) confronts Chief Richard Webber (James Pickens Jr.) about the merger, leading to a heated argument. Meredith remains optimistic, reassuring everyone that their jobs will be safe. A patient, Jodie Crawley (Adrienne Barbeau), arrives with her son Tom (James Frain), who has schizophrenia. Tom insists his mother's moving abdominal growth is an alien, causing concern among the doctors.

Cristina struggles to connect with her pediatric patients, much to Robbins' disappointment. Things take a dangerous turn when Tom, feeling unsettled by Lexie's lack of a name tag, attacks her and flees. His mother is diagnosed with an abdominal aortic aneurysm, and Tom also suffers a fall, requiring surgery. Miranda Bailey (Chandra Wilson) successfully convinces the Crawleys to proceed with the necessary operations.

An OB-GYN resident accidentally severs a baby's arm during a C-section, but the situation is resolved by Mark Sloan (Eric Dane), Robbins, and Yang, who work together to reattach it. Izzie assists Derek in a grueling five-hour brain surgery, with Alex Karev (Justin Chambers) worried about her ability to handle the pressure. Ultimately, Izzie proves she is capable of completing the surgery.

As the episode nears its conclusion, the hospital's HR department sends out an email notifying Olivia Harper (Sarah Utterback) and Steve Mostow (Mark Saul)'s wife, Megan Mostow (Molly Kidder) that they have been fired, marking the beginning of the layoffs caused by the merger.

== Production ==
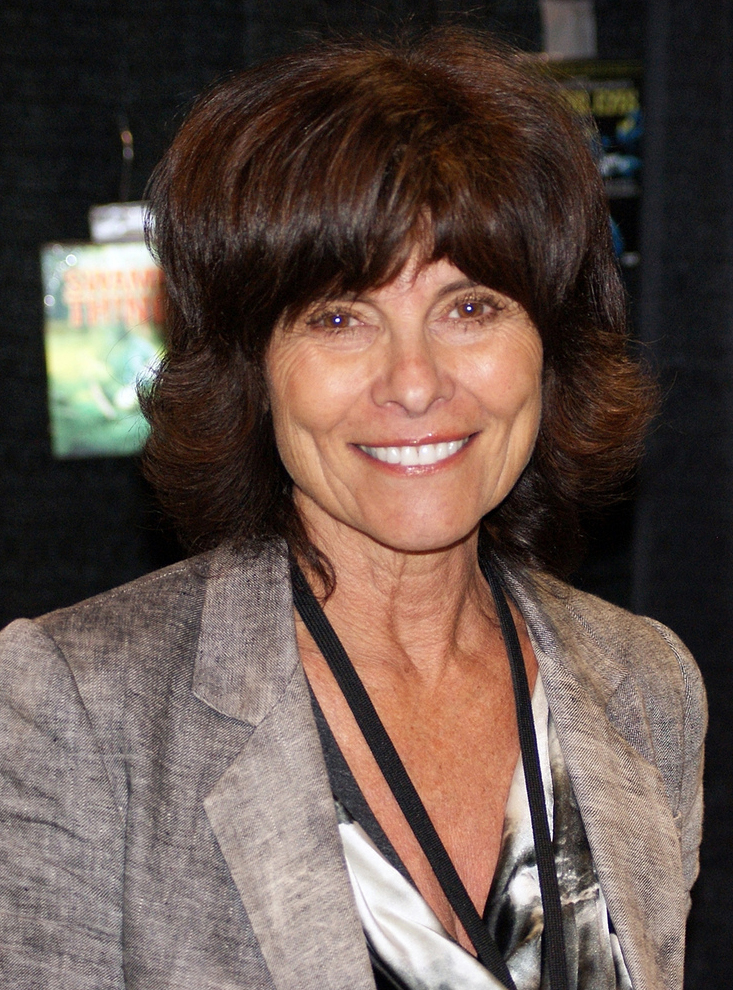
Adrienne Barbeau's character's storyline was inspired by Joan Rater's friend.

The episode was written by Tony Phelan and Joan Rater, and directed by Michael Pressman. David Greenspan edited the episode, while Donald Lee Harris served as production designer. The episode's title refers to the song "I Always Feel Like", by American hip hop group TRU. Featured music includes Gossip's "Pop Goes the World" and Ingrid Michaelson's "The Chain".

Joan Rater, one of the writers, intended for the theme of the episode to focus on "paranoia." Rater explained, "After Richard dropped the bomb that the hospital would be merging with Mercy West, we knew this episode would have to deal with people's paranoia. Because merger means change. And change means fear. The worst kind of fear is the kind that lives in your head—the dark thoughts, the paranoia, the worst-case scenarios that you play out, which usually don’t come true." She further emphasized that with Richard isolating himself in his office, it created a breeding ground for rumors and fear, making paranoia the natural thematic choice for the episode. All storylines in the episode were inspired by Rater's friend base, including the story on schizophrenia. She offered her insight:

"My inspiration for the story of Tom and Jodie came from a kid I knew growing up named Jon. I babysat for him. His mom, Barbara and my mom are friends. We went on vacations with their family. And he grew up and became a paranoid schizophrenic. My mom recently told me a story that when Jon (who’s now 30) needs a haircut, Barbara is unavailable all day for golf or bridge because she never knows how long it will take for Jon to find a barber shop he’s okay with. She has to drive from barbershop to barbershop, waiting for him to get a 'good feeling' about one. It might happen right away, it might take all day. And she's patient and kind and she just does it because she's his mother. I was really moved when my mom told me this story because I know these people and I know how painful this has been for her but how she just handles it, with dignity and humor. I can just picture the scene in the car as she pulls up to yet another one, "Well, Jon?" I can totally see her trying to talk him into giving one a try. And I can see him wanting to do it, to please her, but ultimately being too afraid and telling her they have to try another one. I can just picture the front seat of that car, so full of love and disappointment and fear as they negotiate this very mundane thing that for them has become anything but mundane. Then the story became what it became, with Tom choking Lexie, and falling down the stairs creating a real dilemma for Jodie. And the idea of Bailey pricking her finger to show Tom that she's human, she's a mother and she's a doctor and she's human, that idea came from Krista [Vernoff], but the original inspiration was the complicated love that I've witnessed between these family friends."

— Joan Rater, Grey Matter

AAt the conclusion of the episode, several physicians gather to play a game of baseball as a way to lift their spirits. Rater, one of the episode's writers, called it "her favorite scene," explaining, "I loved the scene where Owen Hunt (Kevin McKidd), Derek Shepherd (Patrick Dempsey), and Mark Sloan (Eric Dane) take Cristina Yang (Sandra Oh), Meredith Grey (Ellen Pompeo), and Lexie Grey (Chyler Leigh) to the baseball field. This is one of the first times Owen has seen Cristina’s intensity, and I love that he makes her leave the hospital and focus on something else. That’s why he’s so good for her."

Rater added that the scene was inspired by Shonda Rhimes, who suggested, "Let’s do a scene where they’re all playing baseball." Reflecting on its impact, Rater remarked, "When I finally saw it, it made me want to write more scenes like that, with our doctors outside of the hospital, little glimpses of them in real life."

== Release ==
"I Always Feel Like Somebody's Watchin' Me" was first broadcast on October 1, 2009, in the United States on ABC. The episode was viewed by a total of 15.69 million Americans, down 1.34% from the previous episode "Goodbye", which garnered 17.03 million viewers. In terms of viewership, "I Always Feel Like Somebody's Watchin' Me" ranked third for the night, just behind CBS's juggernauts CSI and The Mentalist. The episode did not win in viewership, but its 6.1/16 Nielsen rating ranked first in its 9:00 Eastern time-slot and the entire night, for both the rating and share percentages of the key 18–49 demographic, beating out CSI, The Mentalist, Private Practice, and The Office. Although its rating won for the night, it was a decrease from the previous episode, which garnered a 6.7/17 rating/share in the 18–49 demographic.

== Reception ==
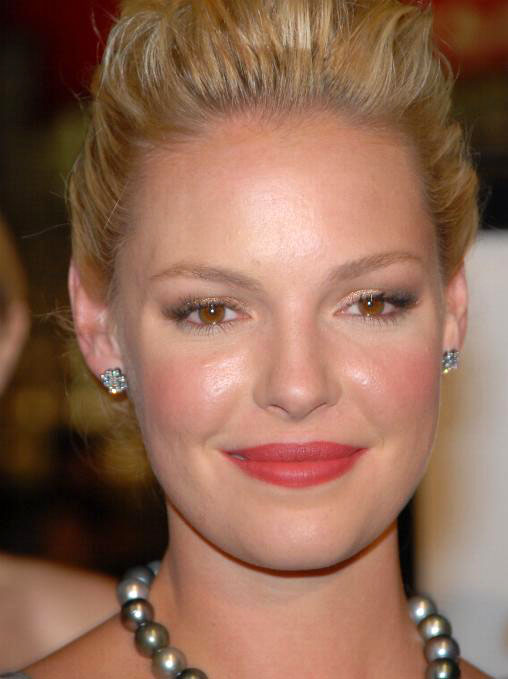
Katherine Heigl's character's wig was the subject of much critical commentary.

"I Always Feel Like Somebody's Watchin' Me" received positive reviews from television critics upon telecast, with high praise directed towards the performances of Sandra Oh (Cristina Yang) and Chyler Leigh (Lexie Grey).

Steve Marsi of TV Fanatic called Cristina's assignment to pediatrics "an epic-fail", but praised Oh's humor in the role, noting it helped lighten the tension in the episode. Marsi also highlighted Lexie's storyline, describing it as "endearing and sad to watch," and concluded that the episode was "classic Grey's Anatomy."

PopSugar gave a positive review of the episode, singling out Derek Shepherd (Patrick Dempsey) and Mark Sloan (Eric Dane) as the only characters managing to stay composed during the hospital's chaos. However, they felt that Meredith Grey’s (Ellen Pompeo) unusual optimism was out of character, likely a reaction to the crisis at hand. Despite this, they found Cristina's impersonation of a bear on pediatric duty "priceless" and praised Izzie Stevens' (Katherine Heigl) storyline, which began as "super annoying" but ended "pretty sweet." Lexie's storyline also earned high marks, with PopSugar noting that "she proves her worth in the end."

"Watching her get attacked by the schizophrenic patient, going crazy around the hospital, and dealing with the repercussions were humorous and emotionally connective. She knew exactly how to deal with the patients' Alien-thoughts with the scans and solved the mother's hesitation, as well. She shouldn't be worried about the merger because she's a good doctor. Her excitement at the end of the show was great, and it quickly turned to sympathy for her friends."

— Michael Pascua on Leigh's character

Cinema Blend's Amanda Krill criticized Izzie's wig, comparing it to a "Stepford Wives wig", and noted that the other characters couldn't help but be distracted by it. Krill enjoyed Oh's portrayal of Cristina dealing with children, calling it "laughable" and adding that it provided much-needed comic relief in an otherwise tense episode. She also praised performances by Dane and Chandra Wilson as Miranda Bailey, especially highlighting Dane's line, "That's how I know my job is safe, Cristina – I reattach babies' arms," as the best of the episode.

Michael Pascua of HuffPost shared Krill's negative view of Izzie's wig, but appreciated Cristina's Stepford Wife joke. Pascua enjoyed Leigh's portrayal of Lexie, calling her a "genuine character" who displayed strong medical competence. Like others, Pascua found Cristina's bear impersonation comical and expressed shock at the sudden departure of Nurse Olivia Harper (Sarah Utterback), criticizing Chief Richard Webber (James Pickens Jr.) for his handling of the cuts while praising Derek for his chivalry.
