= Now or Never (Grey's Anatomy) =

- Grey's Anatomy episode
- George O'Malley (T. R. Knight) appears in a vision of Izzie Stevens (Katherine Heigl) after she flatlines. He is in his army uniform.
- Episode no.: Season 5 Episode 24
- Directed by: Rob Corn
- Written by: Debora Cahn
- Original air date: May 14, 2009
- Running time: 41 minutes

Episode chronology
← Previous "Here's to Future Days"	Next → "Good Mourning"
- Grey's Anatomy season 5

"Now or Never" is the twenty-fourth episode and the season finale of the fifth season of the American television medical drama Grey's Anatomy, and is the 102nd episode overall. Written by Debora Cahn and directed by Rob Corn, the episode was originally broadcast on the American Broadcasting Company (ABC) in the United States on May 14, 2009.

The episode centers around Cristina Yang (Sandra Oh), Alex Karev (Justin Chambers), George O'Malley (T. R. Knight), and Meredith Grey (Ellen Pompeo), who are anxiously waiting for Izzie Stevens (Katherine Heigl) to wake up after her surgery to treat cancer. Meanwhile, Derek Shepherd (Patrick Dempsey) develops an alternative treatment plan for Izzie. Miranda Bailey (Chandra Wilson) confronts Richard Webber (James Pickens Jr.) and Arizona Robbins (Jessica Capshaw) about the pediatric fellowship program. It also touches on Cristina's relationship with Owen Hunt (Kevin McKidd) as she navigates her feelings. Owen offers George career advice, influencing his decision to join the U.S. Army. Another key storyline involves Meredith and Derek's iconic post-it wedding.

The episode marked the last regular appearance of T. R. Knight as a series regular, who portrayed Dr. George O'Malley. O'Malley gets into a life-threatening accident in the episode and dies in the Season 6 premiere, but Knight reprised his role in Season 17 as part of a dream sequence involving Meredith.

The episode attracted an audience of 17.12 million viewers and garnered a 6.2/17 Nielsen rating/share in the 18–49 demographic upon initial broadcast. It received widespread critical acclaim, with high praise directed towards Heigl's performance.

== Plot ==
The episode opens with a voice-over narration from Meredith Grey (Ellen Pompeo) about appreciating the present and not letting life slip by while focusing too much on the future.

Cristina Yang (Sandra Oh) is still wrestling with her feelings about Owen Hunt (Kevin McKidd) and their relationship. Owen tells her that his therapy is going well, but Cristina is still skeptical and cuts him off, questioning why he hasn’t visited his mother, who lives just a few miles away.

Derek Shepherd (Patrick Dempsey) presents a surgical plan to remove Izzie Stevens' (Katherine Heigl) brain tumor, but the procedure could cost Izzie her memory. Izzie struggles to make the decision and asks her friends for guidance, but they only promise unconditional support. To help Izzie make an informed choice, they conduct a neurological test, which goes poorly as Izzie fails to remember basic images or speak properly. This unsettles Meredith, who urges Izzie not to go through with the surgery. Despite the risks, Izzie decides to proceed and signs a Do Not Resuscitate (DNR) order, fearing the possibility of being in a vegetative state. Alex Karev (Justin Chambers), who had married Izzie earlier in the season, is overwhelmed by the thought of losing her.

Later, Cristina notices Owen hugging George O'Malley (T. R. Knight) and asks what’s going on. Owen explains that George has some important news but wants him to share it himself. Owen then changes the topic, mentioning his relief at having slept through the night without nightmares for the first time.

Miranda Bailey (Chandra Wilson) receives the news that she’s been offered the pediatric fellowship, but instead of celebrating, she walks away. She later explains to Arizona Robbins (Jessica Capshaw) and Richard Webber (James Pickens Jr.) that her husband, Tucker Jones (Cress Williams), gave her an ultimatum: if she takes the fellowship, he will divorce her. Bailey plans to leave Tucker, believing ultimatums have no place in marriage, but she also decides to stay in general surgery to avoid the pressures of being a single mother in a demanding fellowship.

Meanwhile, Meredith and Derek decide to move forward with their wedding but realize they won’t make it to City Hall in time. Instead, they improvise by writing their vows on a post-it note, which they both sign and stick in Meredith’s locker.

In the ER, a John Doe is admitted after being hit by a bus while saving a stranger. His injuries are so severe that his face is unrecognizable. The woman he saved, Amanda (Shannon Lucio), frequently checks in on him and calls him "her hero", "Prince Charming" and similar names. When Meredith tends to John Doe, he tries to communicate by tracing something on her hand. Eventually, he manages to trace "007", George's nickname from the first season. Realizing that John Doe is George, Meredith rushes to inform the other doctors, who scramble to save him in the OR.

Izzie wakes up after her surgery, initially seeming healthy and overjoyed when Derek tells her the tumor has been fully removed. However, just minutes later, she asks how the surgery went again, revealing a complete loss of short-term memory. Alex becomes frantic, trying to jog her memory, but nothing seems to work. As Cristina visits Izzie, they slowly realize that Izzie's memory has returned. Just as everyone celebrates her recovery, Izzie's heart suddenly stops.

Alex begins CPR despite Izzie's DNR order, and Webber tries to stop him but eventually decides to defibrillate Izzie. As the doctors work to restart her heart, Izzie has a vision, similar to her experience in the season two finale when she learned of Denny Duquette's (Jeffrey Dean Morgan) death. This time, when the elevator opens, instead of seeing Denny, Izzie sees George dressed in his army uniform.

The episode ends on a cliffhanger, leaving the fates of both George and Izzie uncertain as the season concludes.

== Production ==
News of Knight's possible exit was first reported by Entertainment Weekly. The reports said, "T. R. Knight, who has played lovable intern George O'Malley since the show's debut, has asked producers to write him off the hit medical drama." The finale had the highly publicized exit for T. R. Knight with numerous rumors surfacing around the actor's exit. Fans were shocked when Knight made the surprising decision to leave Grey's Anatomy, the hit medical drama that launched him to fame.

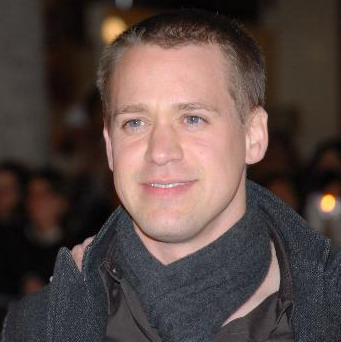
Original cast member T. R. Knight made his last regular appearance as George O'Malley in the episode.

Reports became public that Knight had not been attending table-reads for upcoming episodes or that he had walked off the set and cleaned out his dressing room are inaccurate, a rep for Knight told People."He has been there every day. He was at a table read yesterday. He hasn't said goodbye to anyone." The rep had no further comment on his possible exit." The site further reported that Knight was still upset about former cast member Isaiah Washington's alleged use of a homophobic slur about him in an argument with co-star Patrick Dempsey, which prompted Knight to reveal he was gay, and which some felt series creator Shonda Rhimes took too long to rectify with Washington's dismissal, but a source familiar with Grey's said the speculations were false.

While Knight doesn't specifically fault Rhimes for how the situation was handled behind the scenes, he says the exec producer was among those who tried to discourage him from coming out: "I think she was concerned about having my statement come out so close to the [initial] event." Rhimes denied this, "I said, 'If you want to come out, that's awesome. We'll totally support that.' And then he went away, thought about it, and came back and said, 'I'm going to make this statement.' I remember saying to [fellow executive producer] Betsy Beers, 'This is our proudest day here. T. R. got to come out, and I got to say to him that it wouldn't affect his character'. The idea that a gay actor can't play a straight man is insulting."

Creator Shonda Rhimes gave exclusive interview to Michael Ausiello of Entertainment Weekly on May 15, 2009 and talked about Knight’s alleged unhappiness. About his character's absence from the season and the final scene between George O'Malley and the show's protagonist Meredith Grey, Rhimes said -

There are ebbs and flows. Every character this season has had a lot of ebbs and flows. And every season is shaped differently. With George, I really wanted you to not notice that he wasn’t there for most of this episode. I don’t think anybody noticed because of the way we laid it out this season. He’s an incredibly talented actor. And, actually, he was really lovely and elegant about lying there in all that very painful makeup and prosthetics for much of the episode with no words. That moment where he grabs Meredith’s hand is one of the most affecting moments of the episode, and it was without words. - Shonda Rhimes to EW

When asked if T. R. asked to be released from his contract, Rhimes said, "I absolutely am not going to talk about any private conversations I had with the actors. I feel like that invades their privacy." and added, "I think that there have been lots of rumors about T. R., but T. R.’s never said anything. Take from it what you will."

Later, in an exclusive interview with EW, the actor revealed what led him to his decision. Due to what he called a gradual "breakdown of communication" between himself and exec producer Rhimes, the actor chose not to ask his boss what was going on with his character. He added "My five-year experience proved to me that I could not trust any answer that was given [about George]," he explains. "And with respect, I'm going to leave it at that." He also added that knows he's taking a risk walking away from his top 10 show and $14 million contract. "From an outsider's perspective, I get the [impression that] 'He's just a spoiled actor...he doesn't know how good he has it,'" he says. "There are a lot of people who would like to be in my position. But in the end, I need to be fulfilled in my work."

== Release ==
"Now or Never" was originally broadcast on the American Broadcasting Company (ABC) in the United States on May 14, 2009. The initial airing was viewed by 17.12 million viewers and garnered a 6.2/17 Nielsen rating/share in the 18–49 demographic.

== Reception ==
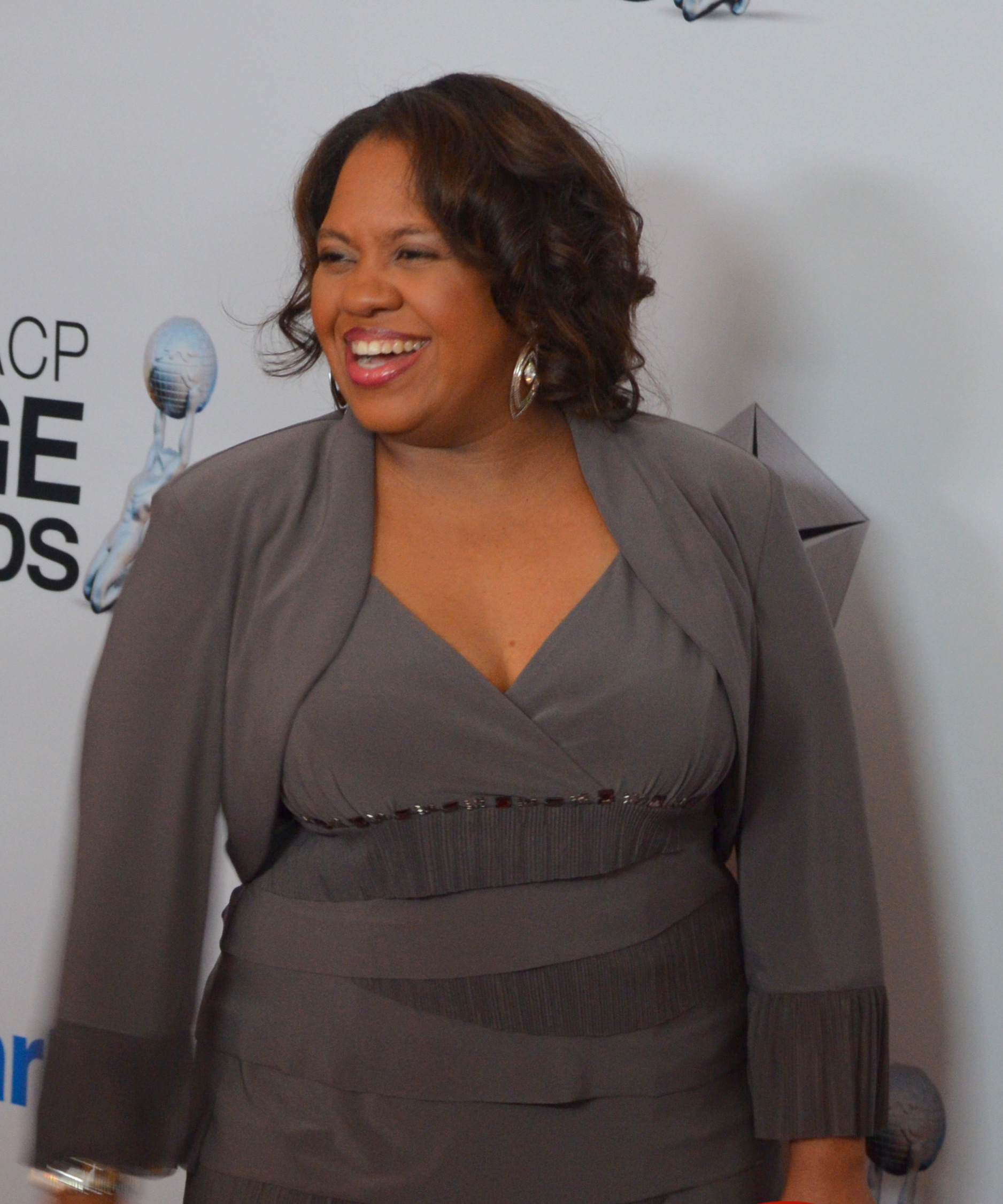
Chandra Wilson was deemed as the best actress among the entire ensemble cast.

"Now or Never" was met with widespread critical acclaim from television critics upon telecast, with high praise directed towards Heigl's performance.

IGN praised the fifth season and its finale as a return to form for Grey's Anatomy, noting that the season successfully restored the well-balanced mix of emotion and drama that characterized the show’s earlier seasons. They added that while the season was an overall success, better planning of future story arcs would ensure a more cohesive narrative in Season 6. IGN concluded, "a return to form for a show that had seemingly flatlined".

PopSugar highlighted the emotional stakes of the episode, stating, "Izzie might be dying! George might be dying!" They lauded the symbolic imagery of Izzie in her pink prom dress and George in his army uniform meeting in an elevator as their colleagues tried desperately to save them back in the hospital. The site also touched on Meredith Grey (Ellen Pompeo) and Derek Shepherd's (Patrick Dempsey) unconventional wedding, noting, "that post-it is enough for me", while acknowledging that they may need to formalize their marriage legally in the future. PopSugar also praised Sandra Oh and Kevin McKidd, stating, "every scene with Cristina and Owen feels so tense I can barely breathe".

Alan Sepinwall gave the episode a glowing review, commending the use of the core cast, particularly the Cristina/Owen and Izzie/Alex scenes. Sepinwall singled out Chandra Wilson (Miranda Bailey) as a standout, particularly in her emotional scenes with James Pickens Jr. (Richard Webber). He also praised Meredith and Derek's post-it note wedding as being "so perfect for their characters". Despite knowing some plot details beforehand, Sepinwall appreciated the episode's execution, noting that Grey's Anatomy is at its best when it fully connects with the emotional pitch it's aiming for, calling it a "free-swinging power-hitter".
