= Zoe Boyle =

English actress (born 1989)

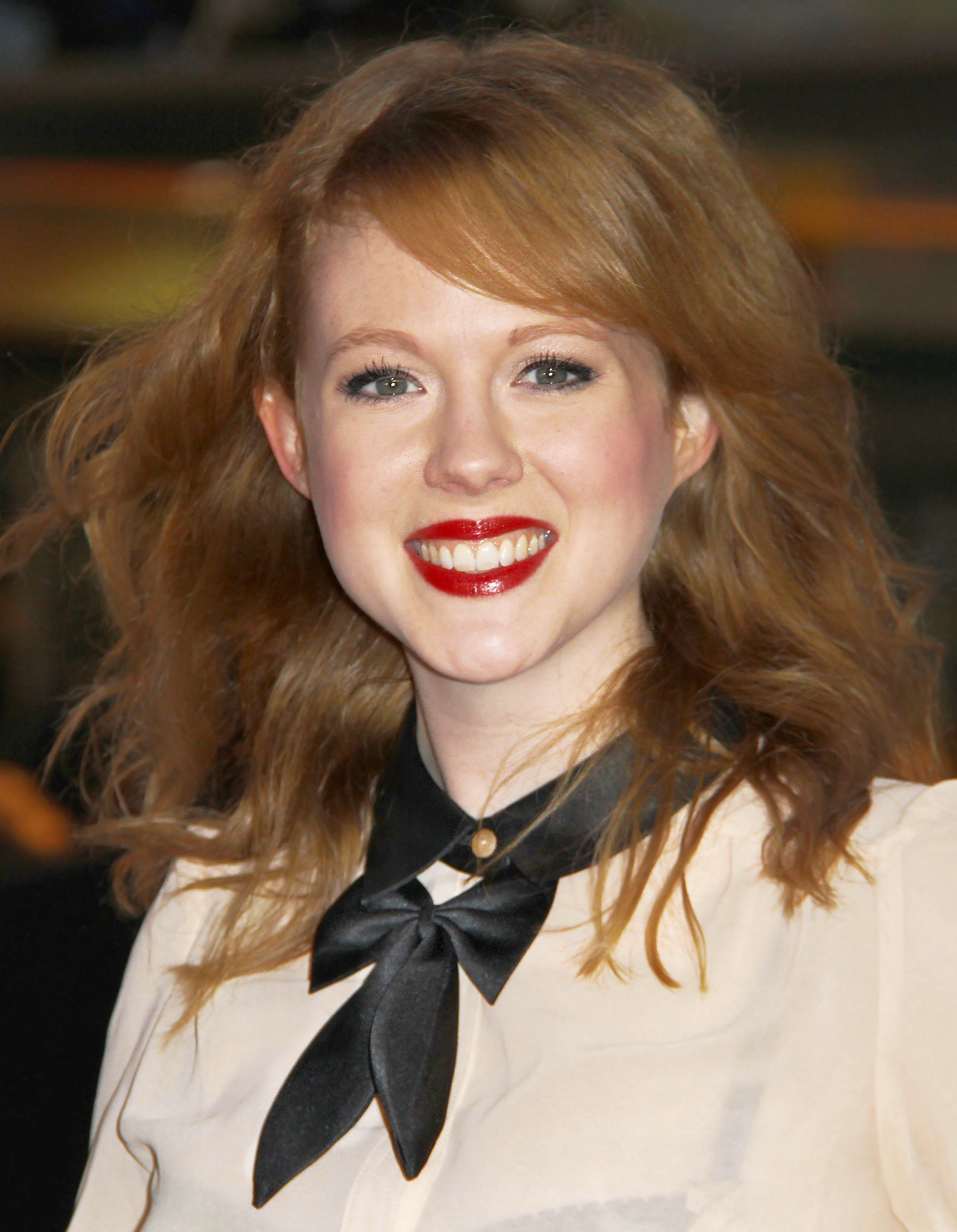
- Zoe Boyle in 2011
- Born: 1 January 1989 (age 37); London, England
- Education: Royal Central School of Speech and Drama
- Occupation: Actress
- Known for: Trinity Ashby Sons of Anarchy Lavinia Swire Downton Abbey

Zoe Boyle (born 1 January 1989) is an English actress known for her roles as Lavinia Swire on the series Downton Abbey and Trinity Ashby on Sons of Anarchy.

== Education ==
Boyle attended the Royal Central School of Speech & Drama, at the University of London and graduated in 2006.

== Career ==
Boyle's breakthrough role was in Downton Abbey as Lavinia Swire. Boyle went on to land recurring roles in the television series Breathless, Frontier, and Witless.

== Theatre ==
Year	Title	Role	Notes	Ref(s)
2008	King Lear	Lady in Waiting	Royal Shakespeare Company	
2012	Cat on a Hot Tin Roof	Maggie	West Yorkshire Playhouse	

== Filmography ==
=== Film ===
Year	Title	Role	Ref(s)
2012	Freeloaders	Emma Greenwood	
2017	Promise at Dawn	The Poetess	
2018	Rémi sans famille	Mrs. Milligan	
2021	The Last Letter from Your Lover	Anne	
2022	Living	Mrs. McMasters	

=== Television ===
Year	Title	Role	Notes
2009	Grey's Anatomy	Clara	Nicknamed Ceviche due to the loss of her arms in a boating accident
2009	Ghost Whisperer	Amber Heaton	
2009	Lewis	Hope Ransome	”Vanishing Point” Season 3, Episode 3
2009	Agatha Christie's Poirot	Jinny Boynton	"Appointment with Death" Series 11, Episode 4
2010	Sons of Anarchy	Trinity “Triny” Ashby	
2011	Downton Abbey	Lavinia Swire	
2013	Breathless	Jean Truscott	
2014	Blandings	Pauline Petite	Series 2, Episode 4
2015	The Astronaut Wives Club	Jo Schirra	
2016–2018	Witless	Rhona	BBC Three comedy drama
2016–2018	Frontier	Grace Emberly	
2018	Death in Paradise	Cressida Friend	"Meditated In Murder" Series 7, Episode 6
2019	Four Weddings and a Funeral	Gemma	Miniseries
2022	That Dirty Black Bag	Michelle	
2024–2025	Tomb Raider: The Legend of Lara Croft	Camilla Roth	Voice; 7 episodes
