= The Price of Free and Fair Elections =

- Scandal episode
- Olivia convinces Fitz (left) to speak to the nation after the bombing.
- Episode no.: Season 3 Episode 18
- Directed by: Tom Verica
- Written by: Shonda Rhimes; Mark Wilding
- Original air date: April 17, 2014

Guest appearances
- Joe Morton as Rowan "Eli" Pope; Madeline Carroll as Karen Grant; Dylan Minnette as Fitzgerald "Jerry" Grant IV; Paul Adelstein as Leo Bergen

Episode chronology
← Previous "Flesh and Blood"	Next → "Randy, Red, Superfreak and Julia"
- Scandal (season 3)

"The Price of Free and Fair Elections" is the 18th episode and season finale of the third season of the American political thriller television series Scandal, and is the 47th overall episode. It aired on April 17, 2014 on ABC in the United States. The episode was written by showrunner Shonda Rhimes and executive producer Mark Wilding and directed by executive producer Tom Verica. The season finale was originally supposed to be the 22nd episode, but because of the show's lead Kerry Washington's pregnancy, the episode count was trimmed by ABC by four episodes, leading the season finale to be the 18th episode.

The episode focuses on the election day between President Fitzgerald Thomas Grant III and Sally Langston, with everyone else trying their best to help Fitz get elected – leading Olivia Pope and Cyrus Beene desperately trying to help.

== Plot ==
President Fitzgerald Grant (Tony Goldwyn) has yet to arrive to the funeral with only 14 minutes left before a bomb goes off, as Cyrus Beene (Jeff Perry) keeps stalling him. Rowan (Joe Morton) is rushed into the hospital after the stabbing by Maya Pope (Khandi Alexander) and Adnan Salif (Nazanin Boniadi) is worried about the President's absence from the church. After calling Cyrus multiple times, Jake (Scott Foley) warns Fitz about the bomb and starts to evacuate just in time before the bomb goes off. Olivia (Kerry Washington) comes to the White House and convinces Fitz to talk to the nation, but faces trouble when the networks use a split screen showing both Fitz and Sally Langston (Kate Burton) as she helps victims outside the church after Leo Bergen (Paul Adelstein) convinced her it will help her chances of winning the election. After the incident, Sally's poll numbers go up, convincing both Olivia and Cyrus that Fitz is going to lose the election. Fitz is desperate to try to win, but Olivia tells him it's over.

Harrison Wright (Columbus Short) convinces Adnan to help her get away from Maya in exchange for letting him go. Harrison and Abby (Darby Stanchfield) discovers Huck (Guillermo Diaz) and Quinn's (Katie Lowes) relationship. Charlie (George Newbern) breaks up with Quinn and gives her an envelope containing information for Huck. After reading the information, Quinn takes Huck to the house where his estranged family lives, leading Huck to become furious. At the White House, Olivia reveals that secret about Mellie being raped by Big Jerry to Fitz, after feeling guilty when Fitz talks about Vermont. Fitz goes to Mellie and reconciles with her.

With 24 hours left until election day, people are speculating that Sally Langston will win the election. Leo Bergen receives advice from Cyrus about being Chief of Staff. Fitz calls Olivia while waiting to give a last speech with his family, explaining that he can't leave Mellie for her and Vermont, not after learning about the rape. Maya shows up at the hospital to threaten Olivia and explains why she tried to kill Fitz. At the same time, as Fitz gives a speech, his son Jerry (Dylan Minnette) suffers a seizure and later dies. At the hospital, Olivia informs the press about Jerry's death due to Bacterial Meningitis. With America rallying behind Fitz after his family's loss, Cyrus and Olivia realize that they are going to win the election. Tom Larsen (Brian Letscher) tells Fitz that a substring of the bacteria that killed Jerry had been stolen from a lab just a few days earlier, and that Jerry was murdered. Rowan talks to Fitz about Jerry, with Rowan convincing Fitz to let him kill the suspect Maya Pope.

On election day, Fitz has a sudden surge in the polls after the loss of his child. Huck tells Olivia that Quinn found his family, and he explains why he can't involve himself in their lives. Olivia accepts Rowan's offer for a new life, which angers Abby. Harrison tells Rowan where Maya will collect her money after Rowan tells him that Adnan was killed. Jake confronts Olivia about her leaving, and Olivia blames everything that has happened on her. Jake asks to come along with her, in which she accepts. When Harrison learns about Olivia leaving, he asks Rowan to stop her. Harrison figures out that it is Rowan who was responsible for Jerry and Adnan's death, and Harrison is killed by Tom. Fitz wins the election, but breaks down in the Oval Office with grief. David receives a bunch of B6-13 files from Jake, along with a note that says, "Go get the bad guys." Huck knocks on the door of his family's new home, and his former wife opens the door. Rowan puts Maya in the hole at B6-13, and Olivia boards the plane with Jake, which takes them into the horizon.

== Production ==
The episode was written by Shonda Rhimes and directed by executive producer Tom Verica. The episode featured the songs "The Light" and "Papa Was a Rollin' Stone". The episode was the last for series regular Columbus Short as Harrison Wright after it was later announced that the actor would not return for the show's fourth season for personal reasons. As such, many critics and fans speculated about the character's fate after Harrison saw himself in a situation where he was pointed a gun at.

The season finale was supposed to be episode 22, however due to the show's lead Kerry Washington's pregnancy, ABC trimmed the episode count by four episodes, to 18 episodes. Filming for the episode began on March 13, 2014, and ended on March 27, 2014. Information about the episode was kept under wraps. During filming the cast and crew were not allowed to take pictures and upload them on social media such as Twitter.

== Reception ==
=== Broadcasting and ratings ===
"The Price of Free and Fair Elections" was originally broadcast on Thursday, April 17, 2014 in the United States on ABC. The episode's total viewership of 10.57 million scored a series high in total viewers, up 15 percent from the last season finale which aired in May 2013, and was the top TV show in the 10:00 p.m. slot, beating Parenthood by 162 percent in Adults 18-19. In the key 18-49 demographic, the episode scored a 3.4 in Nielsen ratings, up 6 percent from the previous season's finale, and the show reached the highest Adult 18-49 number for any 10pm drama telecast on any network since October - the season premiere.

The 10.57 million people tuned into the episode marked a 15 percent viewership increase from the previous season's finale (9.12 million), in addition to the installment's 3.4 Nielsen rating in the target 18–49 demographic marked a 6 percent increase from 3.2, which was from the last season's finale. The Nielsen score additionally registered the show as the week's highest rated drama and highest rated scripted series in the 18–49 demographic, and the fourth-highest rated scripted series in Total Viewers only behind CBS's NCIS (17.12), NCIS: Los Angeles (14.68) and Person of Interest (10.74). Seven days of time-shifted viewing brought an additional 1.5 rating points in the 18–49 demographic and 3.81 million viewers, bringing the total viewership for the episode to 14.39 million viewers with a 4.9 Nielsen rating in the 18–49 demographic.

=== Critical reviews ===
"I think if every episode of Scandal this season had been just like “The Price Of Free And Fair Elections,” this season would have been aces. It’s fast, it’s dramatic, and it pivots so fast it’s basically careening off the rails—which is all I want from Scandal, most of the time."

— Sonia Saraiya, The A.V. Club

The episode got a mixed to positive response from critics, who were happy with the finale but were more critical towards the third season as a whole. Sonia Saraiya from The A.V. Club called the third season short on story and long on time, in addition saying "The third season barreled straight into the sun without looking back. Luvvie from Awesome Luvvie was disappointed about the third season, calling it the weakest so far in the series as Olivia wasn't the strong woman she was in the first two seasons.

Cory Barker from TV.com said: "it's probably for the best that Scandal's third season only ran for 18 episodes as opposed to the typical 22 to 24. Because you guys, it's been a huge mess—and the finale was absolutely no different". Margaret Lyons of Vulture compared the episode to the third season, which she described as "all crescendo, no climax". Avery Thompson from the Hollywood Life called the finale "crazy" because of the numerous twists that occurred in the episode. Meredith Blake from Los Angeles Times said "Sure, this is a finale, so the stakes are necessarily going to be higher, but when the outcome of a presidential election -- on a show that is at least nominally about politics -- plays as a mere footnote, well, then you’ve got one overstuffed episode on your hands."

Many critics commented on the pace of the episode. Andy Swift from TVLine called the finale a non-stop parade of explosions. Cory Baker from TV.com commented that the finale, like the rest of the season, was "stuffed full of moments intended to shock us, or make us feel every single FEEL there is." People's TV critic Tom Gliatto commented on how rushed the finale was, saying, "If you dared to leave the room for a glass of seltzer or to go to the bathroom, you might return and find yourself totally disoriented". Mark Harris, executive editor for Entertainment Weekly, called the episode "an efficient summary of a five-hour episode." Ben Doody from Heavy.com commented on the hype the bomb sequence had gotten before the finale aired but was only a small part of the episode saying "the bomb we’ve spent weeks waiting for goes off in the first few minutes of the episode."

Writing for TV Fanatic, Miranda Wicker criticized the decision Olivia made when she told Fitz about the rape that Mellie had asked her not to reveal, saying, "It wasn't her truth to tell." Sonya Saraiya from The A.V. Club shared her opinion that the rape wasn't Olivia's secret to spill. However, she called the decision a statement of independence for a strong-minded woman. Cory Baker expressed his disappointment that only a small part of the episode dealt with the news of the rape.
