= Say Hello to My Little Friend (Scandal) =

- Scandal episode
- Episode no.: Season 3 Episode 4
- Directed by: Jeannot Szwarc
- Written by: Matt Byrne
- Original air date: October 24, 2013

Guest appearances
- Joe Morton as Rowan "Eli" Pope; Lisa Kudrow as Josephine Marcus; Dan Bucatinsky as James Novak; Melora Hardin as Shelley Meyers; Patrick Fabian as Senator Richard Meyers

Episode chronology
← Previous "Mrs. Smith Goes to Washington"	Next → "More Cattle, Less Bull"

"Say Hello to My Little Friend" is the fourth episode of the third season of the American television series Scandal. It premiered on October 24, 2013 on ABC. The episode was the first to feature Lisa Kudrow as Josie Marcus, a role which had been teased in the summer before the third season premiered.

== Plot ==
After the events of the previous episode Huck attends an Alcoholics Anonymous meeting where he confesses to having relapsed and has begun drinking “whiskey” again. He sees Quinn at the meeting prompting a rift between the two of them.

Jake leaves Olivia's apartment in order to protect her. Before he goes they argue over whether to try and stop Rowan with Liv insisting that she cannot be involved in order to protect both Huck and Jake. Jake instead finds his way to Huck to ask him for help taking down Command, but Huck refuses, determined to protect Liv. Fitz reads about Pete Foster’s suicide in the news and organizes a proper burial for him prompting Cyrus to reach out to Rowan. Jake secretly records the meeting and tries to give the information to Liv who refuses to listen. However, Huck sneaks into Olivia’s office and listens to the recording and realizes that Pete Foster had information on a secret mission involving Fitz and Jake that Rowan is trying desperately to cover up.

Meanwhile the Gladiators are finally hired to clean up the image of Senator Richard Meyers, a politician on trial for murdering Desiree Oaks, a woman he was sexting. While they manage to destroy the murder victim’s reputation they hit a road bump when it is revealed that Meyers has continued to have affairs with other women. His wife nevertheless testifies on the stand that he was with her the night of the murder leading to an acquittal. Liv eventually realizes that Shelley Meyers was the one behind the murder.

Mellie accidentally insults an up-and-coming politician, Josie Marcus (played by Lisa Kudrow) shifting the spotlight onto Josie and minting her as the potential Democratic candidate in the presidential election. Cyrus sends an aid to Montana in order to destroy Marcus’s reputation and discovers that when she was 15 she gave birth to a child she gave up for adoption.

The episode ends with Fitz seeking out Rowan.

== Production ==
Lisa Kudrow’s casting was announced in August 2013.

== Reception ==
The episode received mixed reviews. Sonia Saraiya at The A.V. Club was left wondering if the show had peaked too soon asking "Did the show go too far in season two? And is it too late to recover?"
