= Everything's Coming Up Mellie =

- Scandal episode
- Episode no.: Season 3 Episode 7
- Directed by: Michael Katleman
- Written by: Peter Nowalk
- Original air date: November 14, 2013

Guest appearances
- Khandi Alexander as Maya Lewis; Joe Morton as Rowan "Eli" Pope; George Newbern as Charlie

Episode chronology
← Previous "Icarus"	Next → "Vermont is For Lovers, Too"

"Everything's Coming Up Mellie" is the seventh episode of the third season of Scandal. It premiered on November 14, 2013, in the U.S.

== Plot ==
In the present Mellie is forced to go through an interview in order to win over public sympathy now that the public has turned on her for revealing Fitz's affair. Despite playing up her motherhood her attempts are hampered by the fact that Fitz fails to show up for their joint interview.

The episode flashes back to 15 years in the past when Mellie and Fitz are newlyweds staying in Fitz's father's home. Fitz's father Big Jerry introduces them to Cyrus Beene and they begin grooming Fitz for his political career. Fitz and his father clash and Cyrus starts to leave after Fitz says he will not use his military record for political gain. Mellie gets Cyrus to agree to come back the next day and promise to get Fitz and his father working together. In an attempt to smooth things over Mellie tries to talk to Big Jerry who rapes her while he is drunk. In the morning Mellie tries to brush off the rape and instead uses it as leverage to induce Big Jerry to apologize to Fitz. Fitz agrees to run for Governor of California and Mellie informs him at their campaign celebration that she is pregnant with their first child, who Fitz decides will be called Jerry after his father.

Back in the present a drunk and disappointed Mellie asks Fitz to support her. To her surprise he shows up for their rescheduled joint interview and defends Mellie to their interviewer by taking responsibility for his affair.

Cyrus and Mellie discover that Sally is planning to abandon Fitz and run for president herself. They decide to embroil her husband in an affair but after their attempts to use a woman to seduce him fail they realize he is gay when he shows interest in James.

Fitz in the meantime is trying to reconnect with Olivia who wants nothing to do with him after learning that he shot down the plane her mother was on. After Olivia admits she knows Rowan in a conversation and tells Fitz that he doesn't know everything about her he requests a file on her where he sees a photo of her father “Eli” and recognizes him as Rowan.

At Olivia Pope and Associates Olivia decides to investigate the murder of her own mother. She learns that one passenger was taken off the flight her mother was murdered on: Omar Dresden. The team is able to track down a man who was working the night that Omar was removed from the plane and still lives and works in the area though now as a security guard. Jake makes plans to meet him.

Quinn starts spending more time with Charlie, who says he now works as a private investigator, and she accompanies him on a mission to steal some files. He tells her that he is planning to drug the night guard, injecting him with a sleeping agent and teasingly suggests Quinn do it, then pulls the case away. Quinn says Huck once let her torture someone and she got what they needed. Quinn and Charlie kiss passionately. We next see Quinn talking on the phone to Charlie as she enters the building, where she then injects the security guard. Shortly after she injects him she realizes that whatever she gave him was lethal and she runs from the building. Charlie finds her and shows her security footage of her murdering the security guard and informs her that she now belongs to B613. Jake arrives shortly after since the security guard that Quinn murdered was the one that had the information on Omar Dresden. He realizes that B613 is behind the murder.

Having discovered that Olivia is close to finding out the truth, Rowan visits a restricted jail cell where he informs a still-alive Maya that her daughter is asking questions about her.

== Production ==
Bellamy Young called the experience of playing Mellie "harrowing" and added that she discovered Mellie's rape by Big Jerry at the table read for the episode in front of the rest of the cast. She praised the material saying "It's the chance of the lifetime to have material like this and to have such a rich episode for them to trust me with is humbling and terrifying, wonderful and a blessing." Meanwhile, co-star Kerry Washington referred to the episode as Mellie's Seven Fifty-Two referring to the season two Huck-centric episode.

== Reception ==
=== Critical response ===
"Everything's Coming Up Mellie" received criticism for not including a content warning at the beginning of the show leaving viewers shocked at Mellie's rape. Some reviewers also criticized the way the rape was handled within the plot. However the episode did garner positive reviews with Sonia Saraiya of The A.V. Club giving it a B+ grade calling Mellie's arc within the episode "nearly flawless” and praising Bellamy Young's work. Margaret Lyons writing for Vulture criticized those who found Mellie more sympathetic after her rape and stated that Mellie's "rape is not a referendum on her likability."

Many critics praised Young's performance, in addition to Saraiya. Cicely K. Dyson in her review for The Wall Street Journal states, "Bellamy Young has been an amazing scene stealer for two-and-a-half seasons, and this time she finally got her chance to shine." Robert Rorke writing for The New York Post starts his review saying, "“Scandal” was Kerry Washington's show. Until last Thursday night, when supporting player Bellamy Young, who plays First Lady Mellie Grant, hijacked the series away from her." He goes on to say that, "In Mellie, the show has its most fleshed-out character and in Young, its most compelling performer... The television academy has nominated Washington once for Best Actress in a Drama Series. Let’s see if they remember Bellamy Young next July, when the nominations come out."

=== Ratings ===
The episode garnered 9.04 million viewers.
