= Guess Who's Coming to Dinner (Scandal) =

- Scandal episode
- Episode no.: Season 3 Episode 2
- Directed by: Allison Liddi-Brown
- Written by: Heather Mitchell
- Original air date: October 10, 2013

Guest appearances
- Joe Morton as Rowan "Eli" Pope; Norm Lewis as Senator Edison Davis; Kate Burton as Sally Langston; Samantha Sloyan as Jeannine Locke

Episode chronology
← Previous "It's Handled"	Next → "Mrs. Smith Goes to Washington"

"Guess Who's Coming to Dinner" is the second episode of the third season of American television series Scandal. It premiered on October 10, 2013 on ABC.

Despite being credited as a regular for "It's Handled", the episode marks the first appearance of Scott Foley as Jake Ballard as a regular member of the cast.

== Plot ==
Five years before the present, Olivia joins her father, Eli, at Sunday dinner in return for him paying off her law school loans. On her way home she is mugged by two men but before they can run off with her purse Huck, who she knows as a homeless man, attacks both of them and tells Liv to run. When Olivia asks Huck how he learned to fight the way he did Huck rambles that he worked for a secret offshoot of the C.I.A. called B613 that used a paper company called Acme as a front and was also known by the name "Wonderland." At the following Sunday dinner Olivia asks her father to inquire about it through a friend of his that works for the F.B.I. Her father later tells her that after inquiring about Huck he's learned that Huck has been arrested after attacking a couple and has a long rap sheet. When Liv doubts his story he shuts her down.

Olivia later contacts David Rosen and asks him to run Huck’s prints. He tells her that Huck is not in the system and has never been arrested. Olivia finds her way to the Acme paper company which is at the intersection of Wonderland Avenue. She also realizes that a pen her father gave her earlier has the name of the Acme company on it. When Liv confronts her father about being a member of B613 he warns her not to get involved. However the next Sunday she returns with her fiancé, Senator Edison "Ed" Davis, and threatens her father, telling him to release Huck or she'll leak information of B613 to Ed. Eli does release Huck however he also calls Olivia to tell her that Ed has been in a serious accident and that he does not believe that he is the right man for her. Olivia vows to break off all contact with him but Eli informs her that as family they will never be done with each other.

In the present Olivia takes Jeannine Locke on as a client pro bono to defend her name and assert that she never had an affair with Fitz. Her father visits her at Pope & Associates and threatens Olivia telling her that she needs to let Jeannine take the fall for the affair with Fitz or he'll hurt Jake. Olivia asks Fitz to free Jake so that her father’s threat will no longer be valid. Unbeknownst to her, the only way Fitz is able to grant Jake’s freedom is by confirming his affair with Jeannine. Meanwhile, Quinn, obsessed with hacking, hacks into Olivia’s email account after seeing Eli at the office. She tells Huck about Olivia’s fractured relationship with her father and notes that their falling out seemed to occur over a homeless man. Huck, putting the pieces together, attacks Olivia and ascertains that her father is Command of B613.

At home Olivia receives a call from her father telling her to open her front door. When she does she sees a bloody and shaken Jake Ballard who manages only the word "Hi" before collapsing.

== Production ==
Scott Foley was promoted to a series regular on June 14, 2013 having previously appeared on the show as a guest star.
