= Mrs. Smith Goes to Washington =

- Scandal episode
- Episode no.: Season 3 Episode 3
- Directed by: Oliver Bokelberg
- Written by: Mark Fish
- Original air date: October 17, 2013

Guest appearances
- Joe Morton as Rowan "Eli" Pope; Cynthia Stevenson as Mary Nesbitt; Mark Moses as Jim Struthers; Ernie Hudson as Randolph Boles

Episode chronology
← Previous "Guess Who's Coming to Dinner"	Next → "Say Hello to My Little Friend"

Mrs. Smith Goes to Washington is the 3rd episode of the third season of Scandal. It premiered on October 17, 2013 in the U.S.

== Plot ==
A woman named Mary Nesbitt retains Pope and Associates for a mysterious job. When Quinn discovers that the woman has drawn all her money from her bank account, Olivia goes to find her and discovers her at Congressman Jim Struthers' office holding him hostage with a bomb. Mary proceeds to inform Olivia that the reason she is holding them all hostage is to find out the details behind her son's murder at the hands of F.B.I. agents. Olivia is eventually able to ascertain from Fitz that Chris Lawrence, Mary's son, was a C.I.A. agent but because recruits of his are still working as spies the U.S. government is unable to release that information to the American public. Unable to reveal this information to Mary, Olivia informs her that her son was a terrorist causing Mary to commit suicide by detonating the bomb.

Meanwhile, a man named Peter Foster attempts to contact Fitz in the Oval Office but is stopped by the Secret Service. Upon discovering this, Cyrus contacts Rowan informing him that the two have a “Remington problem.”

Huck, still upset by the discovery that Rowan is Olivia's father, begins to stalk him in the hopes of killing him. Instead he follows him to Peter Foster's trailer where he finds Peter bound and gagged with weapons to make it look as if Peter committed suicide. Huck kills Peter and then returns to the office where he informs Olivia that he's still owned by Rowan. Olivia returns to her apartment and confronts a semi-recuperated Jake about how he managed to escape from B613 and her father.

== Production ==
The dialogue about baby Teddy calling for Marta was worked into the shooting episode as the child actress playing Teddy would not stop crying out that name. Bellamy Young said that "We finally just decided to go with it. When she was screaming for “Marta,” we were like, “We’ll just make it work.” Young also admitted to being nervous about shooting the scene in which she appeared drunk "I got out of the table read and immediately called my acting coach like, “I have to see you. I have to see you tonight, even if it’s at midnight. Seriously, meet me in the alley and teach me how to be fake drunk.”

== Reception ==
Bellamy Young’s performance as a drunk, heartbroken Mellie drew raves with Huffington Post naming her their Scene-Stealer Of The Week praising her for providing "a hilarious and heartbreaking punctuation point to an already riveting hour." The A.V. Club’s Sonia Saraiya offered similar praise saying that Mellie’s speech “shot right to the top of my list of the best Scandal rage-speeches of all time” but was lukewarm on the rest of the episode which she awarded a B−.
