= Scandal season 3 =

Season of American television series Scandal

Scandal
- Season 3
- DVD cover
- Starring: Kerry Washington; Scott Foley; Columbus Short; Darby Stanchfield; Katie Lowes; Guillermo Diaz; Jeff Perry; Joshua Malina; Bellamy Young; Tony Goldwyn
- No. of episodes: 18

Release
- Original network: ABC
- Original release: October 3, 2013 – April 17, 2014

Season chronology
- ← Previous; Season 2 Next → Season 4

The third season of the American television drama series Scandal, created by Shonda Rhimes, began on October 3, 2013, in the United States, on ABC, and consisted of 18 episodes. The season was produced by ABC Studios, in association with ShondaLand Production Company; the showrunner being Shonda Rhimes.

The season continues the story of Olivia Pope's crisis management firm, Olivia Pope & Associates, and its staff, as well as staff at the White House in Washington, D.C. Season three had ten series regulars, all returning from the previous season, of whom seven are part of the original cast of eight regulars from the first season. The season aired in the Thursday 10:00 pm timeslot, the same as the previous seasons.

For her performance, Kerry Washington won the Image Award for Outstanding Actress in a Drama Series and was nominated for Outstanding Performance in a Drama Series at the Screen Actors Guild Award, Best Actress in a Television Series at the Golden Globe Awards, and Outstanding Lead Actress in a Drama Series at the Primetime Emmy Awards.

== Plot ==
The season focuses on Fitz's re-election campaign for his second term, as well as, Olivia's family problems after her father comes back into her life and she discovers that her mother (believed to be deceased for 20 years) is alive, which leads to Olivia Pope & Associates trying to find Olivia's mother, Maya Lewis.

After Olivia's name is leaked to the press as Fitz's mistress, Olivia Pope & Associates face financial troubles when all their clients fire them. The firm accepts "new" clients in order to pay the bills. Rowan becomes more involved with Olivia's life, which begins to affect her, and leads Huck and Jake to investigate B613. They discover during a military action code named "Operation Remington" Fitz shot down a civilian aircraft over Iceland and Olivia's mother was one of over 300 casualties. Olivia goes to Fitz and asks him about it, but he refuses to respond. Determined to find out the truth about Operation Remington, the firm investigates Rowan and learns that a passenger was removed from the flight by a Federal Marshall just prior to take off. Quinn starts to hang out with Charlie, who sets her up to kill a security guard who was an eye-witness to the Federal Marshal's removal of the passenger. As a result of Quinn's inadvertent murder, Huck tortures her and she leaves the firm.

It's revealed that Maya was the passenger who didn't get on the plane, and that she has been imprisoned by Rowan for the last 20 years. She manages to break free and Olivia is shocked when her "dead" mother contacts her. When Rowan finds out about Maya's escape, he puts her on FBI's most wanted terrorists list. Olivia manages to arrange a flight to Hong Kong with Maya on it, but after she leaves Olivia figures out that Maya really is a terrorist by the name Marie Wallace. After Fitz captures Rowan at the Pentagon, Olivia asks Fitz to arrest her mother, but Maya manages to escape.

Meanwhile, Fitz faces problems when Congresswoman Josephine "Josie" Marcus is in the running to win the Democratic Party primary against Senator Samuel Reston and become the first female president of the United States. Cyrus tries his best to find dirt on Marcus in order to ruin her campaign, but fails. After Olivia finds out that Fitz shot down the plane which killed her mother, she declines the offer of being the campaign manager for Fitz's re-election and becomes the manager for Josephine Marcus'. After an incident with Marcus' sister, Josephine backs out of her campaign.

Cyrus discovers that Sally plans to run against Fitz as an Independent when she hires Leo Bergen to be her campaign manager. He tries to blackmail her by having James flirt with her husband, Daniel Douglas. However, James figures out Cyrus' plan, and sleeps with Daniel devastating Cyrus. When Sally finds out about this, she becomes furious and kills her husband. After the murder, Sally calls Cyrus for help. David gets a visit from a woman from the NSA who has the recording of the conversation between Sally and Cyrus, which David shares with James.

The second part of the season focuses more on the re-election campaign as Olivia has taken over as the campaign manager. At the same time, Sally announces that she is running for president by being an independent. As a result, Fitz chooses the governor of California, Andrew Nichols, as his new vice presidential running-mate. It is revealed that Nichols had a romantic relationship with the First Lady, Mellie. The campaign faces problems when Sally, stricken with guilt over murdering Daniel, almost reveals the truth at a debate. Cyrus asks Jake to help protect the secret, which he does by killing James to prevent exposing Cyrus's involvement in the cover up. The president's eldest children, Jerry and Karen Grant, come to the White House for an interview, but Olivia soon figures out that they aren't pleased with their parents.

Maya and Adnan Salif team up with Dominic Bell, who gives them a bomb. Olivia and her team, with the help of Rowan, track down Dominic and try to find Maya. In the season finale, the bomb goes off in a church, which Sally uses to her advantage to rise in the polls. On the election day, Olivia and Cyrus are convinced that Fitz has lost, but Rowan orders Tom to kill Jerry, which ultimately makes Fitz win the election. Olivia takes up her father's offer and leaves with Jake to an unknown location for a new life.

== Cast and characters ==
=== Main ===
- Kerry Washington as Olivia Pope
- Columbus Short as Harrison Wright
- Scott Foley as Jacob "Jake" Ballard
- Darby Stanchfield as Abigail "Abby" Whelan
- Katie Lowes as Quinn Perkins
- Guillermo Diaz as Huck
- Jeff Perry as White House Chief of Staff Cyrus Beene
- Joshua Malina as David Rosen
- Bellamy Young as First Lady Melody "Mellie" Grant
- Tony Goldwyn as President Fitzgerald "Fitz" Thomas Grant III

=== Recurring ===
- Joe Morton as Eli "Rowan" Pope
- Kate Burton as Vice President Sally Langston
- George Newbern as Charlie
- Paul Adelstein as Leo Bergen
- Khandi Alexander as Maya Lewis/Marie Wallace
- Dan Bucatinsky as James Novak
- Brian Letscher as Tom Larsen
- Sharmila Devar as Lauren Wellman
- Jon Tenney as Governor Andrew Nichols
- Nazanin Boniadi as Adnan Salif
- Jack Coleman as Second Gentleman Daniel Douglas Langston
- Lisa Kudrow as Congresswoman Josephine "Josie" Marcus
- Tom Amandes as Governor Samuel Reston
- Samantha Sloyan as Jeannine Locke
- Dylan Minnette as Fitzgerald "Jerry" Grant IV
- Sally Pressman as Candace Marcus
- Carlo Rota as Ivan
- Erica Shaffer as News Reporter
- Madeline Carroll as Karen Grant
- Mackenzie Astin as Noah Baker

=== Guest stars ===
- Cynthia Stevenson as Mary Nesbitt
- Norm Lewis as Senator Edison Davis
- Mark Moses as Congressman Jim Struthers
- Ernie Hudson as FBI Commander Randolph Boles
- Gregg Henry as Hollis Doyle
- Patrick Fabian as Senator Richard Meyers
- Melora Hardin as Shelley Meyers
- Barry Bostwick as Fitzgerald Grant II
- Brenda Strong as Joan Reston
- Sebastian Roché as Dominic Bell

== Production ==
Scandal was renewed for a third season on May 10, 2013. Along with other ABC dramas, this season was split into two runs of uninterrupted episodes, the first consisting of ten episodes. The second run, initially set to consist of 12 uninterrupted episodes, began on February 27, 2014. On December 7, 2013, ABC Studios, announced that due to Kerry Washington's pregnancy, the overall episode order would be trimmed from 22 to 18, which led the season finale to air four weeks earlier on April 17, 2014.

It was announced on May 9, 2014, by ABC that Scandal would return in the fall of 2014 for Season 4.

=== Casting ===
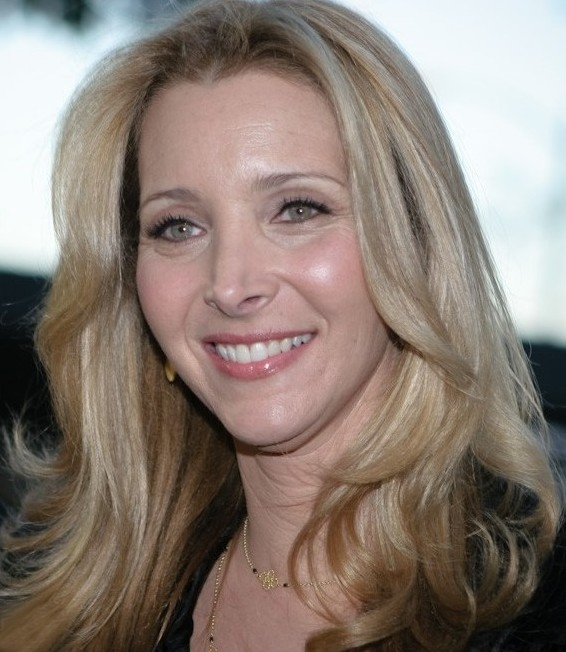
Lisa Kudrow was cast as a Congresswoman for the season.

The third season had ten roles receiving star billing, with all of them returning from the previous season, seven of which part of the original cast from the first season. Kerry Washington continued her role as protagonist of the series, Olivia Pope, a former White House Director of Communications with her own crisis management firm. Scott Foley was upgraded to a series regular, portraying Captain Jake Ballard. Darby Stanchfield played Abby Whelan, Katie Lowes acted as Quinn Perkins who leaves Olivia's firm in the second part of the season for B613. Guillermo Diaz continued playing the character Huck, the troubled tech guy who works for Olivia. Jeff Perry played Cyrus Beene, the Chief of Staff at the White House, who loses his husband James. Joshua Malina played David Rosen, now the re-instated U.S. Attorney. Bellamy Young continued playing First Lady Melody "Mellie" Grant, who begins a relationship with Andrew Nichols, Fitz's Vice President nominee, while Tony Goldwyn portrayed President Fitzgerald "Fitz" Thomas Grant III.

On June 14, 2013, Scott Foley was promoted to regular as of the third season. Casting for Lisa Kudrow was announced on August 28, and was revealed to be playing Congresswoman Josephine Marcus for multiple episodes. Private Practice alum Paul Adelstein was announced to join the cast as Leo Bergen, however at the time of the announcement, details on who he would play were kept under wraps. On September 23, 2013, it was announced that Sally Pressman would be playing a recurring role on the show, which turned out to be the sister of Congresswoman Josephine Marcus, played by Lisa Kudrow. Jack Coleman joined the cast in a recurring role as Daniel Douglas, the husband to Vice President Sally Langston.

On November 5, 2013, Khandi Alexander was cast in a recurring role as Olivia's mother for a multiple episode arc. On December 3, 2013, it was announced that the show was casting for a new role as a handsome, charismatic fella named Andrew, who would be a love interest for Bellamy Young's character, Mellie. A few days later, on December 6, 2013, actor Jon Tenney was announced to have landed the role of Andrew. On January 28, 2014, it was announced that Scandal was casting the guest-starring roles of Jerry Grant and Karen Grant, Tony Goldwyn and Bellamy Young's characters' children A week later, on February 6, 2014, it was reported that the guest-starring roles of Jerry and Karen had been landed by Dylan Minnette and Madeline Carroll. The duo appeared in the fifteenth episode in addition to the season finale.

== Episodes ==
No. overall	No. in season	Title	Directed by	Written by	Original release date	Prod. code	U.S. viewers (millions)
30	1	"It's Handled"	Tom Verica	Shonda Rhimes	October 3, 2013	301	10.52
After Olivia’s identity as President Grant’s mistress is leaked to the media in last season’s finale, her firm faces tremendous pressure as all her clients drop her in light of the scandal. Her father Rowan Eli Pope, who turns out to be the leader of B613, sends her into hiding, but Cyrus convinces Olivia to stay. Olivia then uses the emergency code the President gave her to force a secret meeting with Mellie and Fitz, in which they come up with an explanation about the affair. Meanwhile, Olivia’s team and Cyrus join forces to save Olivia and Fitz. They leak a video, which accuses White House employee Jeannine Locke of being Fitz’s potential mistress. The news shocks Olivia as she takes on Locke as her client. Mellie correctly deduces that Fitz was the one who leaked Liv’s identity, so that she would lose her leverage. Rowan shows Cyrus the real report about an operation called Remington Fitz and Jake were on, which shocks Cyrus when he reads it.
31	2	"Guess Who's Coming to Dinner"	Allison Liddi-Brown	Heather Mitchell	October 10, 2013	302	9.01
Olivia’s team manages to find evidence that clears Locke and prepares her to go on television to dispute the claim. Rowan tells Liv to stop helping Locke or Jake will die. She asks the President to release Jake, but he is shocked to learn that he has no authority over B613. He tells B613 through Cyrus that he will claim Locke as his mistress in exchange for releasing Jake. Mellie later convinces Locke to lie for money. But before she could do it, the President personally appears on television to make that claim. Jake is then released. Through flashbacks, the origins of Olivia's distant relationship with Rowan are revealed - they only met on Sunday for dinner. After Olivia showed interest in Huck, he ordered B613 to kidnap him because Huck told Olivia about B613. She later uncovered the truth about B613 and forced him to release Huck. She canceled the Sunday meeting in disgust. In the present, Jake is only released because Olivia agrees to meet her father on Sundays again; and Huck confronts Olivia with her father being on B613 and asks whether he is "Command" (its leader), which Olivia admits.
32	3	"Mrs. Smith Goes to Washington"	Jeannot Szwarc	Matt Byrne	October 17, 2013	303	9.51
A mother who refuses to accept the government’s claim that her dead son was a terrorist hires Pope & Associates. Later, the mother takes Olivia and a congressman hostage at the Capitol with a bomb in order to get the file on her son declassified. Olivia’s team and David try to uncover the truth while racing against time. They manage to force the government to secretly admit that he is a deep cover CIA operative sent to infiltrate Al-Qaeda and his death is a mistake, but his true identity cannot be revealed for national security reasons as 57 other agents are still undercover. Olivia is forced to lie, causing the mother to commit suicide. Meanwhile, Huck attempts to kill Rowan after having learned from Olivia that he is B613 command, but Rowan instead makes Huck kill Pete Foster, who earlier attempted to break in the Oval Office to talk to the President about Remington. Olivia and Jake discuss about how her father still owns them.
33	4	"Say Hello to My Little Friend"	Oliver Bokelberg	Mark Fish	October 24, 2013	304	8.62
Olivia pushes Jake away and refuses to go against B613 after realizing her father’s ability to control Huck. Struggling to find clients, Pope & Associates takes on Senator Meyers who was accused of murdering a girl who he had sent explicit photos to. He is cleared of the crime after Olivia’s team discredits the girl and has the wife testify as his alibi during the trial. However, Olivia is able to figure out that the wife was the murderer. Mellie insults Democratic congresswoman Josephine Marcus not knowing the mic is still on, turning her into a viable threat. Cyrus manages to find dirt on Marcus. Meanwhile, Jake attempts to gather evidences about Operation Remington. Huck later takes interest after realizing Foster is a part of Remington and joins Jake. They force Olivia to look at the evidences. President Grant meets Rowan to discuss Remington. Meanwhile, Huck attends an AA meeting and sees that Quinn listens to him. Quinn tries to befriend Huck but he won’t let her, telling her to stop asking questions and being interested in what he did.
34	5	"More Cattle, Less Bull"	Randy Zisk	Jenna Bans	October 31, 2013	305	9.18
President Grant and Rowan realize someone is looking into Operation Remington. Cyrus and Mellie work on Fitz’s re-election campaign and try to hire Leo Bergan as manager, but he refuses. Democratic Congresswoman Josie Marcus hires Olivia when details of her teen pregnancy get out. Olivia’s team fails to contain it, forcing Marcus to admit the truth during the Democratic debate. She fires Olivia. During the White House Correspondents' Dinner, Mellie asks Olivia to come back and lead the re-election campaign. Marcus, realizing her mistake, also tries to get Olivia back. Meanwhile, Jake and Huck learn the truth about Operation Remington, implying a correlation between President Grant's fighter jet in Iceland and the crash of the passenger plane Olivia’s mother was flying on. Vice President Sally Langston seeks Bergan’s advice on whether or not she should run as a third-party/independent candidate.
35	6	"Icarus"	Julie Anne Robinson	Peter Noah	November 7, 2013	306	8.66
Liv questions the President about his role in the downed aircraft, but he refuses to confirm or deny his involvement, prompting Liv to work for Josie Marcus, which shocks Mellie and Cy. Rowan, realizing Jake is the one looking into Remington, plots to have him killed while pushing Cy to take down Marcus. Marcus’ campaign desperately needs money and endorsements, but she prefers to play nice, prompting Liv’s team to use a fake ad to toughen her image in front of the national media. Cy tries to turn Harrison against Liv by threatening to give a visa to Adnan Salif, a person by which Harrison fears to be killed, but it fails. Cy orders to give him a visa. Jake meets with his contact whom he asked to look for evidence on Remington, but it turns out to be Rowan’s trap to kill Jake, who is saved by a man sent by the President. Cy learns of Sally Langston’s treachery while Rowan is slowly turning a deranged Quinn into an assassin through Charlie.
36	7	"Everything's Coming Up Mellie"	Michael Katleman	Peter Nowalk	November 14, 2013	307	9.04
Mellie is filmed for an in-depth interview to make a good publicity image of her and Fitz's relationship. Through flashbacks, it's revealed how Big Jerry (Fitz’s father) introduced Cyrus to the Grant family and how Cyrus tried to help Fitz to become the Governor of California by exploiting Fitz' war history. Mellie tried to fix Fitz and Big Jerry relationship, but it ended with Big Jerry raping Mellie. She used this to force Big Jerry to support Fitz. It is also revealed what really happened (and Jerry covered up): Fitz flew for Black Ops, and he was given the order to shoot down the airplane as they had evidence that there was a dirty bomb inside of it. So Jerry arranged that Fitz officially participated in Operation Remington during that time, far away from Iceland, where he actually shot down the airplane. In the present, Cyrus and Mellie try to find a way for Daniel Douglas to cheat on Sally so they can blackmail her. Meanwhile, Olivia is angry at Fitz because of him not telling her the truth about operation Remington. Therefore, OPA tries to find out what really happened to her mother. Quinn goes on a mission with Charlie, after they made out, but ends up killing a security guard who knew something about Remington. Charlie tells her she belongs to B613 now. Rowan finds out Olivia is trying to find the truth, and goes to visit Maya, Olivia's mother in jail; revealing that she is alive after all.
37	8	"Vermont is for Lovers, Too"	Ava DuVernay	Mark Wilding	November 21, 2013	308	8.93
After Rowan informs Maya that Olivia is looking for her, she begins to chew her wrists, ends up in a hospital bed, and manages to escape. Back at OPA, they are trying to figure out who murdered the security guard, Quinn being the one. Josie's campaign is put at risk when a laptop with all the information about the campaign is stolen. It's revealed to be a staged break-in by Candace (who also slept with Harrison), however Josie takes the blame and withdraws from the primary. Fitz flies Olivia to Vermont where he shows her the house he built for them and their future family, and they end up sleeping together. He tells her that he is going after Rowan to figure out why he was ordered to shoot down the plane, and she tells him not to sell the house. Meanwhile, Cyrus and Mellie plan to make James interview Daniel Douglas, hoping to catch him making a move on James. The plan works, but James figures it out and sleeps with Daniel. Huck finds out that Quinn killed the security guard and confronts her about it. Maya shows up outside Olivia's apartment - Olivia is shocked to see her.
38	9	"YOLO"	Oliver Bokelberg	Chris Van Dusen	December 5, 2013	309	8.27
Huck tortures Quinn for betraying Olivia, but while pulling her teeth out, Olivia calls him and informs him that her mother is in her apartment. Olivia takes her mother to a safe house where the rest of OPA discusses the situation. They realize Rowan is tracking Maya, so they cut out her tracker and go to a motel. OPA tries to get Maya out of the country, but Rowan has put her on the FBI's most wanted list. Olivia asks Fitz to help her. Meanwhile, Daniel Douglas tries to convince James that their little affair was a mistake. James confronts Cyrus about him using James to sleep with Daniel, and demands a divorce. Sally informs Fitz that she is planning to run as an independent against him. Cyrus tries to blackmail Sally by showing the pictures of Daniel and James, but to no avail. Quinn joins Charlie at B613, after having slept with him, however she's planning to take out Command. Maya boards the plane to Hong Kong, and Olivia realizes her mother actually was a terrorist, named Marie Wallace. Sally calls Cyrus to tell him that she just killed her husband, Daniel Douglas.
39	10	"A Door Marked Exit"	Tom Verica	Zahir McGhee	December 12, 2013	310	9.22
It is revealed that Daniel Douglas was about to leave Sally when she stabbed him in rage, and Cyrus helps to clean up the murder. The next day when the doctor comes over, Cyrus manages to cover up the crime by having Sally to not be willing to let go of her husband. James suspects that Daniel was murdered and tells David Rosen, who also gets evidence by his assistant. Rowan, on the looking for Maya, gets captured by Fitz, and is taken to the Pentagon until Maya is free. Jake and Huck discover where he is, and Olivia goes to Rowan to get answers to why he ordered the shooting of the plane that killed 329 people. Olivia figures it out - her mother tricked Rowan to think there was a bomb on the plane. Meanwhile, Quinn tries to go back to OPA, but discovers that Huck is not sorry for his actions and she decides to leave. Jake is made the new command by Fitz, and Maya is revealed to be in Washington, D.C., after escaping from the plane which should have taken her to Hong Kong. James tells Cyrus that if he’s named the White House Press Secretary, he’ll stay with Cyrus.
40	11	"Ride, Sally, Ride"	Tom Verica	Raamla Mohamed	February 27, 2014	311	9.32
Chaos spreads at the White House when they learn that Sally is not resigning as Vice President, but rather plans to run against Fitz as a third party because she can’t support his immoral road. She won't stop being the Vice President, and Fitz wants the Governor of California, Andrew Nichols, to be his new VP. Olivia is back in the White House as Fitz's campaign manager, and Leo raises new claims about Olivia and Fitz's relationship. Therefore, Mellie asks Olivia to find a man so the attention surrounding the rumor about the affair passes. Cyrus tells Olivia that Jake is now the new command of B613. The media starts digging into the news that Sally's husband never had an autopsy, being fed by an anonymous source named Publius (which is James), and OPA tries to get answers from the woman who conducted the autopsy. However, Cyrus tries to put a stop to this by having Quinn and Charlie kidnap the woman's son. Meanwhile, David and James plan to reveal the truth about Daniel Douglas, James saying that Cyrus is a monster needed to be brought down. Rowan makes a threat to Olivia that Fitz won't make it to his second term having him as an enemy and helps Leo Bergen. At the announcement of the new VP, it is revealed that Mellie and Andrew used to be together. Olivia decides to have Jake as her pretend boyfriend. Harrison is terrified that Adnan Salif is coming for him - but then they sleep together.
41	12	"We Do Not Touch the First Ladies"	Oliver Bokelberg	Heather Mitchell	March 6, 2014	312	8.53
Olivia and Fitz are in a hotel room getting dressed after spending the night together. He is very upset because Olivia chose Jake to be her pretend boyfriend, creating tension between Olivia and Jake. It's revealed that after Big Jerry raped Mellie 15 years ago, she attempted suicide. However, Andrew found her and saved her from dying. A reporter finds out that there was drug use (those which Mellie took to commit suicide) within the Grant family under the time Fitz was Governor, and OPA tries to cover up the problem. Meanwhile, Quinn tries to prove to Jake that she is capable of being a B613 agent by spying on Rowan, but she is exposed by Olivia. James is afraid that Cyrus could learn that he is leaking information about Daniel's murder under the alias of Publius. Cyrus enlists Charlie to kidnap Publius. James convinces David to meet with the reporter as "Publius", and David avoids being kidnapped by Charlie since Abby and Huck kidnap and protect him first. Mellie and Andrew kiss, but Mellie backs out of it and feels terrible. Adnan makes a donation to the Fitz reelection campaign, and it is revealed that she is working with Maya Pope. She forces Harrison to help her by saying that Olivia doesn’t know about Clearwater yet and thinks the only thing Harrison is guilty of is insider trading. Jake is handed all the information of B613, and discovers that Secret Service agent Thomas Larsen is a B613 agent working inside the White House.
42	13	"No Sun on the Horizon"	Randy Zisk	Matt Byrne	March 13, 2014	313	8.22
Panic begins to spread as Sally wants to reveal her secret about killing her husband in order to fix her relationship with God. Cyrus and Leo try their best to keep the revelation from happening. Olivia learns the secret when David plays her the tape of Sally's conversation to Cyrus. She tells Fitz about the murder, and tells him to throw the debate so Sally won't tell. Cyrus asks Jake to kill Sally in order to keep the secret, and Jake puts a sniper at the presidential debate aiming for Sally. Meanwhile, Jake puts Quinn on a new job selling paper at B613. After she gets tired of the simple task, Quinn tells Jake how Olivia can get emotionally to him; Jake promotes her. Cyrus discovers a microphone in his office that James planted. He confronts his husband, but does not blame James for going against him. James and David meet up with a reporter and the NSA employee who knows about Sally and her actions. Jake shows up, kills both the reporter and the NSA employer, and shoots either James or David.
43	14	"Kiss Kiss Bang Bang"	Paul McCrane	Mark Fish	March 20, 2014	314	9.08
It turns out it was James who got shot by Jake in order to protect the secret of Sally Langston killing her husband. David agrees to keep quiet about what just happened. Through flashbacks we are shown the early days of Cyrus and James' relationship. We see their first date, first kiss and the moment when Cyrus decided to come out to Fitz by inviting James to dance with him at the ball. At the White House, the presidential election campaign gets suspended for a few days by Olivia because of the murder of James. Cyrus, not willing to deal with his husband’s death, takes on more work, worried that Sally will steal the gun lobbyists. Meanwhile, Olivia realizes that Jake was the one behind killing James and confronts him, worrying that he is starting to be more like her father. Huck confronts Quinn about stealing the Daniel Douglas files, and it ends with them kissing. Olivia, after her talk with Rowan about how B613 changes you, decides to take down the organization. Maya and Adnan discuss terrorism and their involvement and want to meet with a certain Ivan. Meanwhile, Andrew and Mellie sleep together.
44	15	"Mama Said Knock You Out"	Tony Goldwyn	Zahir McGhee	March 27, 2014	315	9.01
The Grant kids arrive to the White House for an interview with the whole Grant family. Conflicts arise when it is revealed that Jerry and Karen don't understand why Mellie stays with Fitz after his infidelity. Olivia discovers that Jerry has a Twitter account where he writes bad things about his father, and that he wants to wear a Reston campaign t-shirt at the interview. After Karen catches Mellie and Andrew having oral sex, Fitz finds out about it and punches Andrew. Fitz and Mellie argue, and Fitz blames Mellie for the end of their marriage because she stopped being sexual. However, the real reason was that Mellie was raped by Fitz's father, Jerry Sr. Meanwhile, OPA tries to find out where B613 gets their funding. Rowan reveals after a fight with Jake that the organization is funded by all departments of the government. Adnan seeks help from OPA to get away from Maya Pope. However, it is all a plan. She knocks out Harrison with a syringe and steals all the information about the plans of the presidential election campaign and its whereabouts, presenting it to Ivan.
45	16	"The Fluffer"	Jeannot Szwarc	Chris Van Dusen & Raamla Mohamed	April 3, 2014	316	9.13
While Olivia is with her father trying to figure out how to take down B613, Abby is serving as Olivia's proxy at the White House. Olivia realizes that she's the "maid" when her mother tells her that she's the one who cleans up everything. The presidential re-election campaign is hit with a problem when Jeannine Locke comes out with a book about her fake affair with the president. Governor Reston gains points in his campaign by visiting his wife in jail. But Cyrus and Leo team up to take down Reston, publishing that Reston killed his wife's lover on purpose. Elsewhere, Olivia has to get to Jake's phone for a password, and she manages to do so by sleeping with him. Huck gains access to all the servers of B613 and Olivia gives him the order to shut the agency down. Just when Quinn and Charlie are about to find out what Maya and Adnan's plans are with a bomb they are presented, B613 gets shut down and Quinn tries to take care of business herself by running into the hotel, followed by Charlie. Back at OPA, Olivia and the others are celebrating their victory when Jake comes in and starts choking Olivia. He says that she just killed the president.
46	17	"Flesh and Blood"	Debbie Allen	Severiano Canales & Miguel Nolla	April 10, 2014	317	9.23
OPA teams up with Rowan in order to find Maya, and both Charlie and Quinn are called in by Jake. They figure out that to find Maya, they have to find the man she loves; Dominic. Huck finds him, and Rowan plays Russian roulette with him while on the phone with Maya. However, she refuses to tell where the bomb is and Rowan kills Dominic. Meanwhile, a senator dies and Sally fights Fitz to give the eulogy at the funeral. But Fitz is not allowed out of the White House by Olivia since Maya is after him. Mellie asks for a paternity test to find out who Jerry's father is. Leo finds out about the request and tries to find out for himself, but Rowan sets him up by saying it's Fitz. Quinn and Huck end up kissing and having sex in the parking garage outside OPA, while Maya Pope strolls right pass them. She confronts Rowan, stabs him and then activates the bomb, which is at the senator's funeral. Jake figures it out and informs Cyrus about this, but Cyrus keeps quiet and stalls the President at the White House, while Sally Langston actually is at the funeral.
47	18	"The Price of Free and Fair Elections"	Tom Verica	Shonda Rhimes & Mark Wilding	April 17, 2014	318	10.57
The bomb goes off in the church, but not before Fitz evacuates the funeral with help from Jake. Sally takes advantage of the situation by helping victims, which helps her reach the top of the polls. Olivia and Cyrus are convinced that Fitz has lost the election. Olivia tells him the secret about Mellie being raped, which causes him to stay with Mellie. Charlie gives Quinn an envelope containing information about Huck's family, whom Huck later meets. As Fitz gives a speech at a rally, his son Jerry suffers a seizure and later dies of bacterial meningitis, which makes Fitz surge in the polls. Fitz finds out that Jerry was poisoned, and hires Rowan to kill Maya Pope for the murder. Olivia finally takes up her father’s offer of a new life, and Abby feels betrayed by her decision. Jake asks Olivia to take him with her, and she agrees. Huck desperately tries to convince Olivia that Rowan isn't to be trusted. Rowan forces Harrison to help him capture Maya, and Harrison figures out that Rowan was behind the deaths of Jerry and Adnan. When Harrison confronts Rowan with this, he is killed by Tom. Fitz wins the presidential election, but breaks down crying and tries to call Olivia. Jake sends David copies of all the classified B613 files and then meets Olivia at the plane Rowan has arranged.

== Reception ==
The season premiere returned with a generally favorable response from critics, with many commenting that the show lived up to and if anything surpassed the high bar set by the previous season. The review aggregator website Rotten Tomatoes reports a 95% approval rating with average rating of 8.30/10 based on 22 reviews. The website's consensus reads, "Scandal finds its footing in season three, allowing its characters to blossom and providing the kind of intrigue that makes serialized television so addictive." In social media, the season premiere delivered 712,877 tweets, making Scandal #1 most social series on Thursday night. Kerry Washington was nominated for an Emmy Award (Outstanding Lead Actress in a Drama Series) and a Golden Globe Award for her performance in the season.

The season premiere had 10.5 million total viewers, up 71 percent from last season's start in September 2012. The season finale had 10.5 million total viewers, up 15% from last season's finale in May 2013. The third season had an average of 11.5 million in Total Viewers, up 39% from the second season which had a total of 8.3 million. It also went up in Adults 18–49 with 43% with an average of 4.0/12, while the previous season had a 2.8/8. This qualifies Scandal as TV's fastest growing returning series. Repeats air on BET.

== Ratings ==
=== Live + SD ratings ===
No. in series	No. in season	Episode	Air date	Time slot (EST)	Rating/Share (18–49)	Viewers (m)	18–49 rank	Viewership rank	Drama rank
30	1	"It's Handled"	October 3, 2013	Thursdays; 10:00 p.m.	3.6/10	10.52	10	19	1
31	2	"Guess Who's Coming to Dinner"	October 10, 2013	Thursdays; 10:00 p.m.	3.1/9	9.01	8	24	2
32	3	"Mrs. Smith Goes to Washington"	October 17, 2013	Thursdays; 10:00 p.m.	3.3/10	9.51	7	19	1
33	4	"Say Hello to My Little Friend"	October 24, 2013	Thursdays; 10:00 p.m.	2.9/8	8.62	15	—N/a	3
34	5	"More Cattle, Less Bull"	October 31, 2013	Thursdays; 10:00 p.m.	2.9/9	9.18	11	23	3
35	6	"Icarus"	November 7, 2013	Thursdays; 10:00 p.m.	2.8/8	8.66	12	—N/a	3
36	7	"Everything's Coming Up Mellie"	November 14, 2013	Thursdays; 10:00 p.m.	2.9/9	9.04	12	25	4
37	8	"Vermont is for Lovers, Too"	November 21, 2013	Thursdays; 10:00 p.m.	2.9/8	8.93	12	25	2
38	9	"YOLO"	December 5, 2013	Thursdays; 10:00 p.m.	3.0/8	8.27	12	24	2
39	10	"A Door Marked Exit"	December 12, 2013	Thursdays; 10:00 p.m.	3.2/10	9.22	9	18	1
40	11	"Ride, Sally, Ride"	February 27, 2014	Thursdays; 10:00 p.m.	3.4/10	9.32	8	21	1
41	12	"We Do Not Touch the First Ladies"	March 6, 2014	Thursdays; 10:00 p.m.	2.8/8	8.53	8	25	2
42	13	"No Sun on the Horizon"	March 13, 2014	Thursdays; 10:00 p.m.	2.8/8	8.22	8	25	2
43	14	"Kiss Kiss Bang Bang"	March 20, 2014	Thursdays; 10:00 p.m.	2.9/9	9.08	3	16	1
44	15	"Mama Said Knock You Out"	March 27, 2014	Thursdays; 10:00 p.m.	3.1/9	9.01	6	17	1
45	16	"The Fluffer"	April 3, 2014	Thursdays; 10:00 p.m.	2.9/9	9.13	7	19	1
46	17	"Flesh and Blood"	April 10, 2014	Thursdays; 10:00 p.m.	3.0/9	9.23	5	16	1
47	18	"The Price of Free and Fair Election"	April 17, 2014	Thursdays; 10:00 p.m.	3.4/11	10.57	2	8	1

=== Live + 7 Day (DVR) ratings ===
No. in series	No. in season	Episode	Air date	Time slot (EST)	18–49 rating increase	Viewers (millions) increase	Total 18–49	Total viewers (millions)	Ref
30	1	"It's Handled"	October 3, 2013	Thursdays; 10:00 p.m.	1.3	3.32	4.9	13.84	
31	2	"Guess Who's Coming to Dinner"	October 10, 2013	Thursdays; 10:00 p.m.	1.5	3.76	4.6	12.76	
32	3	"Mrs. Smith Goes to Washington"	October 17, 2013	Thursdays; 10:00 p.m.	1.6	3.94	4.9	13.45	
33	4	"Say Hello to My Little Friend"	October 24, 2013	Thursdays; 10:00 p.m.	1.6	4.02	4.5	12.64	
34	5	"More Cattle, Less Bull"	October 31, 2013	Thursdays; 10:00 p.m.	1.7	3.89	4.6	13.07	
35	6	"Icarus"	November 7, 2013	Thursdays; 10:00 p.m.	1.6	4.16	4.4	12.81	
36	7	"Everything's Coming Up Mellie"	November 14, 2013	Thursdays; 10:00 p.m.	1.7	4.07	4.6	13.11	
37	8	"Vermont is for Lovers, Too"	November 21, 2013	Thursdays; 10:00 p.m.	1.6	3.94	4.5	12.88	
38	9	"YOLO"	December 5, 2013	Thursdays; 10:00 p.m.	1.5	3.92	4.5	12.20	
39	10	"A Door Marked Exit"	December 12, 2013	Thursdays; 10:00 p.m.	1.4	3.67	4.6	13.04	
40	11	"Ride, Sally, Ride"	February 27, 2014	Thursdays; 10:00 p.m.	1.5	4.11	4.9	13.43	
41	12	"We Do Not Touch the First Ladies"	March 6, 2014	Thursdays; 10:00 p.m.	1.6	4.09	4.4	12.62	
42	13	"No Sun on the Horizon"	March 13, 2014	Thursdays; 10:00 p.m.	1.7	4.22	4.4	12.42	
43	14	"Kiss Kiss Bang Bang"	March 20, 2014	Thursdays; 10:00 p.m.	1.5	3.80	4.4	12.88	
44	15	"Mama Said Knock You Out"	March 27, 2014	Thursdays; 10:00 p.m.	1.6	3.87	4.7	12.89	
45	16	"The Fluffer"	April 3, 2014	Thursdays; 10:00 p.m.	1.6	3.72	4.5	12.85	
46	17	"Flesh and Blood"	April 10, 2014	Thursdays; 10:00 p.m.	1.8	4.24	4.8	13.47	
47	18	"The Price of Free and Fair Election"	April 17, 2014	Thursdays; 10:00 p.m.	1.5	3.81	4.9	14.39	

== Awards and nominations ==
Award	Category	Nominee	Result
BET Award	Best Actress	Kerry Washington	Won
Critics' Choice Television Award	Best Supporting Actress in a Drama Series	Bellamy Young	Won
Critics' Choice Television Award	Best Guest Performer in a Drama Series	Joe Morton	Nominated
Dorian Award	TV Performance of the Year – Actress	Kerry Washington	Nominated
Golden Globe Award	Best Actress in a Television Drama Series	Kerry Washington	Nominated
Gracie Award	Outstanding Drama	Scandal	Won
NAACP Image Award	Outstanding Drama Series	Scandal	Won
NAACP Image Award	Outstanding Actress in a Drama Series	Kerry Washington	Won
NAACP Image Award	Outstanding Supporting Actor in a Drama Series	Joe Morton	Won
NAACP Image Award	Outstanding Supporting Actor in a Drama Series	Columbus Short	Nominated
NAACP Image Award	Outstanding Supporting Actor in a Drama Series	Guillermo Diaz	Nominated
NAACP Image Award	Outstanding Writing in a Dramatic Series	Zahir McGhee ("Mama Said Knock You Out")	Nominated
Primetime Emmy Award	Outstanding Lead Actress in a Drama Series	Kerry Washington	Nominated
Creative Arts Emmy Award	Outstanding Guest Actor in a Drama Series	Joe Morton	Won
Creative Arts Emmy Award	Outstanding Guest Actress in a Drama Series	Kate Burton	Nominated
Prism Award	Drama Series Episode – Substance Use ("Snake in the Garden")		Won
Prism Award	Performance in a Drama Series Episode ("Snake in the Garden")	Tony Goldwyn	Nominated
Screen Actors Guild Award	Outstanding Performance by a Female Actor in a Drama Series	Kerry Washington	Nominated
Vision Award	Best Drama	Scandal	Won

== DVD release ==
Scandal: The Complete Third Season
Set Details	Special Features
18 Episodes (1 extended); 4-Disc Set; English (Dolby Digital 5.1 Surround); English SDH, Spanish and French subtitles; Runtime: 782 minutes	Extended Finale Episode: "The Price of Free and Fair Elections"; Creating D.C. In L.A. - See the Locations at Set; Spotlight Cast Piece: Jeff Perry; Deleted Scenes; Bloopers
Release Dates
Region 1	Region 2
September 23, 2014	January 19, 2015
