= More Cattle, Less Bull =

- Scandal episode
- Episode no.: Season 3 Episode 5
- Directed by: Randy Zisk
- Written by: Peter Noah
- Original air date: October 31, 2013

Guest appearances
- Joe Morton as Rowan "Eli" Pope; Lisa Kudrow as Josie Marcus; Kate Burton as Sally Langston; Paul Adelstein as Leo Bergen

Episode chronology
← Previous "Say Hello to My Little Friend"	Next → "Icarus"

"More Cattle, Less Bull" is the fifth episode of the third season of Scandal. It premiered on October 31, 2013, in the U.S.

== Plot ==
Olivia has her weekly dinner with her father while Jake and Huck break into his house to look for clues on Operation Remington. They find footage of Rowan and Fitz talking together about the operation and realize that he was not the pilot on the flight but was instead involved in another secret mission somewhere in Iceland.

Josie Marcus hires Olivia and her team to cover up a teenage pregnancy she had. The team goes to Montana and manages to bribe the few people who knew about the pregnancy into not speaking to the media. They do, however, discover that Josephine's child was never placed for adoption and that the child was raised as Josephine's younger sister, Candace, who now works with Josie. Right before Josie's debate against Governor Reston Olivia discovers that Reston has been leaked the news by Cyrus prompting her to advise Josie to come clean and admit that she placed a child for adoption. Candace does the math and figures out she's actually Josie's daughter prompting Josie to fire Olivia.

In the meantime Olivia finds herself struggling with her relationship with Fitz. She throws her secret Fitz phone in the trash only to retrieve it when he calls. She asks Jake to accompany her to the White House Correspondents' Dinner as a cover but when she is called away from the table by the Secret Service she encounters Mellie who begs her to come back and run Fitz's re-election campaign. At the end of the night Jake reveals that he knew he was there as an excuse for Olivia to see Fitz and warns her that he isn't willing to play second fiddle.

Abby and David's relationship continues to progress along a positive note until she lies to him that she's still in Montana to avoid going to the White House Correspondents' Dinner with him. David later realizes that Abby skipped the dinner as her abusive ex-husband was in attendance.

At the end of the night, after leaving Jake, Olivia receives an offer from Josie to work as her campaign manager leaving her with the option of working with either Fitz or Josie.

Jake returns to his home where Huck informs him that he has discovered that a plane was shot down in Iceland when Fitz was there and that one of the passengers was Maya Lewis, Olivia's mother. The two rush to Olivia's apartment to present her with this new evidence.

== Production ==
Paul Adelstein was announced as a recurring guest star on September 9, 2013. Adelstein’s wife Liza Weil played Amanda Tanner during the first season of the show.
