= Icarus (Scandal) =

- Scandal episode
- Episode no.: Season 3 Episode 6
- Directed by: Julie Anne Robinson
- Written by: Peter Noah
- Original air date: November 7, 2013

Guest appearances
- Khandi Alexander as Maya Lewis; Joe Morton as Rowan "Eli" Pope; Lisa Kudrow as Josie Marcus; George Newbern as Charlie; Kate Burton as Sally Langston

Episode chronology
← Previous "More Cattle, Less Bull"	Next → "Everything's Coming Up Mellie"

"Icarus" is the sixth episode of the third season of American television series Scandal. It premiered on November 7, 2013 on ABC.

The episode marked the first appearance of Khandi Alexander as Maya Lewis, Olivia Pope’s mother, a role that would become pivotal throughout the rest of the season.

== Plot ==
Olivia reminisces about the last time she saw her mother alive. In the present she goes to the White House to ask Fitz about his involvement in Operation Remington. When Fitz refuses to tell her about Operation Remington she decides that she will not work on his re-election campaign and instead accepts an offer from Josie Marcus.

At Josie Marcus’ campaign headquarters Olivia and Abby try to persuade Josie that she needs to shed her homemaker image and launch a series of attack ads in order to secure big donors. When Josie refuses, Olivia and Abby set up an interview with James Novak. Right before the interview they show Josie video from an attack ad from Reston's campaign leading her to show a more dominant aggressive side in her interview mentioning her years of military service and criticizing Novak for his language couched in sexist remarks.

Meanwhile, Olivia asks Jake to gather more proof of what happened during Operation Remington. He tries to use an old contact to secure the airplane's black box and narrowly avoids being assassinated by a member of B613, saved only by a member of Fitz's security team. Olivia reaches out to her father in an attempt to find answers but is only able to ascertain that he did not give the order to kill her mother.

Cyrus, upset at Olivia for abandoning Fitz's re-election campaign, contacts Harrison and asks him to get Olivia to drop Josie Marcus as a client, threatening that otherwise Adnan Salif, a former associate of Harrison's, could re-enter the country. Harrison asks Huck for his help in denying Salif's visa application. Cyrus, after learning through Harrison that Olivia is still campaigning for Josie Marcus, issues Adnan Salif a visa to re-enter the country. Cyrus also discovers that Sally is planning a bid for presidency.

Upset at being frozen out by Huck, Quinn takes to a shooting range where she is discovered by Charlie who gives her tips on improving her form. Unbeknownst to her Charlie is working under the orders of Rowan Pope to bring Quinn into the fold of B613.

== Production ==
News of Khandi Alexander’s casting became public November 5th, 2013. The news that the role of Olivia Pope’s mother would be recurring sparked rumours that the character was still alive despite only appearing in a flashback. Alexander later revealed that she was offered the role without an audition and was unable to tell anyone that she had landed the role of Olivia’s mother stating "I didn't tell my agent, my manager, my boyfriend. I didn't tell anybody and I didn't know anything."

Actress Lisa Kudrow who played Josie Marcus praised the material given to her for Josie's impassioned on-air speech against sexism and compared Josie to politician Elizabeth Warren stating “[I] understood what was going on, and thought it was so great. I really loved it because it made me think of like Elizabeth Warren, for example."

== Reception ==
The episode earned positive reviews with many singling out Lisa Kudrow’s performance in particular. Sonia Saraiya at The A.V. Club praised the episode noting that "Scandal is at its best when it's firing on all cylinders, and there seem to be about 18 cylinders at present, at least." Cicely K. Dyson writing for The Wall Street Journal noted that "Josie’s not here for your sexist rhetoric, and I can't wait to see more." Jake Flanagin at The Atlantic was prompted by the episode to write an op-ed entitled "Lisa Kudrow Is Saving Scandal From Itself” where he praised both the actress and the writing on the show stating that "this upstart candidate for the Democratic presidential nomination embodies the kick-ass, uncompromising feminist politico the show has been lacking.
