= It's Handled =

- Scandal episode
- Episode no.: Season 3 Episode 1
- Directed by: Tom Verica
- Written by: Shonda Rhimes
- Original air date: October 3, 2013

Guest appearances
- Joe Morton as Rowan "Eli" Pope; Kate Burton as Sally Langston; Samantha Sloyan as Jeannine Locke

Episode chronology
← Previous "White Hat's Back On"	Next → "Guess Who's Coming to Dinner"

It’s Handled is the first episode of the third season of Scandal. It premiered on October 3, 2013 in the U.S. While Scott Foley was made a regular during the hiatus between seasons he does not appear in this episode.

== Plot ==
Picking up immediately from where the season finale left off, Rowan drives Olivia to a private airplane hangar where he berates her before informing her that arrangements have made for her to disappear until her scandal blows over. Olivia agrees to her father’s arrangements, however on the plane she makes a final goodbye call to Cyrus who pleads with her to stay informing her that if she does he will protect her. Olivia leaves the plane and returns to her office where she informs her team that the White House is handling the scandal and they need to focus on work. Shortly thereafter she discovers that all of their clients have dropped them. While Olivia desperately contacts her clients Harrison rallies the team by telling them that the White House will destroy Olivia in order to protect Fitz and they need to act quickly in order to clear her name.

Meanwhile, Cyrus and Mellie work together to try and discover who leaked the information about Olivia. When they cannot Cyrus orders Jeannine to collect a kill file on Olivia. He learns from the file that Olivia's mother died when she was young and after her death she never lived in the family home again. After discovering her history of dating older, powerful men Cyrus decides that they will use the information to destroy Olivia in the press.

Olivia uses her emergency access codes to meet with Fitz and Mellie in a secret bunker. Mellie and Olivia agree that Fitz needs to come clean about the affair and Olivia will claim she slept with Fitz two times and Mellie will stand by him.

After his meeting with Mellie and Olivia, Fitz meets with Sally and urges her to denounce him after he publicly admits to his affair. She tells him she will.

In the meantime Harrison has rallied the team to his side and gathered dirt on Jeannine Locke which he passes on to Cyrus who leaks it to James. The dirt is a video in which a drunken Jeannine professes her love for Fitz. The media immediately picks up the story and announces that Jeannine is Fitz’s mistress.

Fitz, upon hearing the news goes to Mellie where he learns that she was the one who conceived the plan to leak another woman’s name since she realized that Fitz had leaked Olivia’s name hoping that by introducing her to the public and having Mellie by his side he could eventually leave Mellie and be with Olivia.

Olivia, after learning what her team has done, takes on Jeannine as a client.

Meanwhile, Rowan uses Charlie to summon Cyrus to B613 headquarters where he shows him a special folder that reveals the truth about Operation Remington.

== Production ==
Scott Foley was promoted to a series regular on June 14, 2013 having previously appeared on the show as a guest star. It’s Handled is his first credit as a series regular despite the fact that his character does not appear.

== Reception ==
Sonia Saraiya writing for The A.V. Club awarded the episode an A grade declaring "anything that has me this invested after a long dry summer is firing at all cylinders, at the top of its game."
