= Jeff Perry (American actor) =

American actor (born 1955)

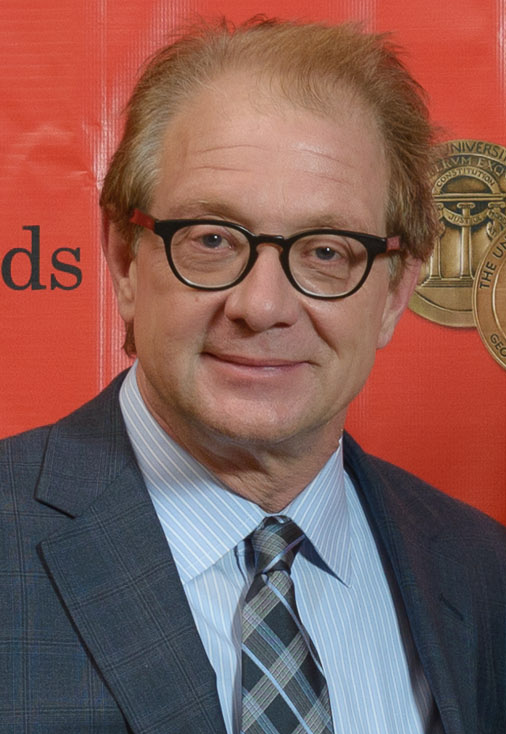
- Perry at the Peabody Awards, May 2014
- Born: August 16, 1955 (age 71); Highland Park, Illinois, U.S.
- Education: Illinois State University
- Occupation: Actor
- Years active: 1978–present
- Spouses: Laurie Metcalf (m. 1983; div. 1986); Linda Lowy (m. 1989)
- Children: 2, including Zoe Perry

Jeffrey Perry (born August 16, 1955) is an American actor of stage, television, and film. He is known for his role as Richard Katimski on the teen drama My So-Called Life, Terrance Steadman on Prison Break, Thatcher Grey on the medical drama series Grey's Anatomy, Cyrus Beene on the political drama series Scandal, all for ABC, and as Inspector Harvey Leek on the CBS crime drama Nash Bridges. He most recently starred on the ABC drama Alaska Daily, alongside Hilary Swank.

== Career ==
Perry is a co-founder of the Steppenwolf Theatre Company in Chicago. He and schoolmates Gary Sinise and Terry Kinney started the company in one end of the cafeteria at Highland Park High School and later moved it to a small space in the Immaculate Conception Church in Highland Park. It has since grown into a notable national theater company whose alumni include John Malkovich, John Mahoney, and Joan Allen. Perry remains an executive artistic director along with co-founders Kinney and Sinise.

After spending nearly two decades with Steppenwolf, Perry moved to Los Angeles in 1987 to pursue film and television work. Perry perhaps is best known as San Francisco Police Department inspector Harvey Leek (a diehard Grateful Dead fan) on the CBS police drama series Nash Bridges. He was a tough superior to Kevin Bacon's detective in the thriller Wild Things (1998). His many television and film credits include The Human Stain (2003), Hard Promises (1991) and The Grifters (1990) as well as appearances on My So-Called Life (1994), The West Wing (2003), The Practice (2003), Lost (2005), Cold Case (2006), Raines (2007), and several episodes of Grey's Anatomy (2005) as Meredith Grey's father, Thatcher Grey. He replaced John Billingsley in the role of Terrence Steadman in the critically acclaimed TV show Prison Break(2006).

In 2022, Perry returned to the stage in the Broadway revival of Death of a Salesman, portraying Uncle Ben alongside Wendell Pierce and Sharon D. Clarke. His performance was praised for its "restrained authority and emotional intelligence," highlighting his continued versatility across stage and screen.

Perry also has been in multiple stage productions. These include Time of your Life (in San Francisco and Seattle), Grapes of Wrath (Broadway and London), and The Caretaker (Broadway). He starred in the Tracy Letts play August: Osage County on Broadway, which originated at Steppenwolf Theatre in Chicago. In 2012, he appeared Off Broadway playing Christopher, the aggressive father in Tribes by Nina Raine.

From 2012 to 2018, Perry starred in the ABC drama series Scandal as Cyrus Beene.

In 2015, Perry performed alongside his daughter Zoe Perry and actor Kevin McKidd in Eugene O'Neill's Pulitzer Prize-winning drama Anna Christie at the Odyssey Theatre Ensemble in West Los Angeles. During the production, he said "During Anna Christie the biggest challenge I had was working with my daughter and sort of not stopping and asking an audience member for a camera to record the moment."

In 2022-23, Perry starred as editor Stanley Kornik in the ABC drama series Alaska Daily.

== Personal life ==
Perry was born in Highland Park, Illinois, where his father was a teacher at Highland Park High School. He graduated from Illinois State University in 1978. In 2011, Perry received an honorary doctorate from Illinois State University in recognition of his extraordinary contributions to the field of theatre.

Perry was married to actress Laurie Metcalf from 1983 until 1986. They had a child, actress Zoe Perry, together in 1983, but they subsequently divorced. In 1989, he married Linda Lowy, Grey's Anatomy's casting director, with whom he has a daughter, Leah Perry.

Perry encouraged Georgia voters who planned to cast a ballot in the 2021 U.S. Senate races to make sure their ID met requirements and contact VoteRiders with questions about acceptable ID or help obtaining it.

== Filmography ==
- Remember My Name (1978) as Harry
- A Wedding (1978) as Bunky Lemay
- Say Goodnight, Gracie (1983)
- Tales from the Hollywood Hills: Closed Set (1988) as Bud
- Three Fugitives (1989) as Orderly Two
- Family Ties as David Simmons (1 episode, 1989)
- Columbo: Murder, Smoke, and Shadows as Leonard Fisher (1989)
- Roe vs. Wade (1989)
- The Final Days (1989) as Staffer
- The Grifters (1990) as Drunk
- Shannon's Deal (1 episode, 1990)
- Equal Justice as ADA Warren (1 episode, 1990)
- The Flash as Charlie (1 episode, 1990)
- Thirtysomething as David Hall (2 episodes, 1989-1991)
- American Playhouse as Noah Joad (1 episode, 1991)
- Brooklyn Bridge as Joel Jacobson (2 episodes, 1991)
- Civil Wars (1 episode, 1991)
- Hard Promises (1991) as Pinky
- Life on the Edge (1992) as Ray Nelson
- Storyville (1992) as Peter Dandridge
- A Private Matter (1992) as Randall Everett
- Casualties of Love: The Long Island Lolita Story (1993) as Amy's Attorney
- Murder in the Heartland (1993) as Earl Heflin
- L.A. Law as Jonah Burgee (3 episodes, 1993)
- Naked Instinct (1993) as Frat Boy
- Body of Evidence (1993) as Gabe
- Playmaker (1994) .... Allen
- My So-Called Life as Richard Katimski (4 episodes, 1994-1995)
- Kingfish: A Story of Huey P. Long (1995) as Earl Long
- Chicago Hope as Gilbert Weeks (3 episodes, 1995)
- American Gothic as Artie Healy (1 episode, 1996)
- Into Thin Air: Death on Everest (1997) as Doug Hansen
- Wild Things (1998) as Bryce Hunter
- Lansky (1999) as American Lawyer
- Nash Bridges as Insp. Harvey Leek (122 episodes, 1996-2001)
- Frasier as John Clayton (1 episode, 2002)
- NYPD Blue as Gordon Dillit (1 episode, 2003)
- The Human Stain (2003) as Tennis Player
- ER as Officer Mitch Palnick (1 episode, 2003)
- The District as Lemma (1 episode, 2003)
- The West Wing as Burt Ganz (1 episode, 2003)
- The Practice as Randy Markham (1 episode, 2003)
- Lost as Frank Duckett (1 episode, 2005)
- Law & Order: Trial by Jury as Andrew Soin (1 episode, 2005)
- Numb3rs as Morton Standbury (1 episode, 2005)
- Invasion as Terrence Gale (1 episode, 2005)
- Close to Home as Uncle Bill (1 episode, 2005)
- Cold Case as Eric Witt (1 episode, 2006)
- Crossing Jordan as Kyle Everett (1 episode, 2006)
- The Valley of Light (2007) as Taylor Bowers
- Prison Break as Terrence Steadman (3 episodes, 2006-2007)
- Raines as Harry Tucker (1 episode, 2007)
- The Last Supper: 13 Men of Courage (2007) as Bartholomew
- Side Order of Life as Reno (1 episode, 2007)
- American Dad! as Nicholas Dawson (1 episode, 2007)
- Diminished Capacity (2008) as Casey Dean
- Saving Grace as Det. Walter Eckley (1 episode, 2009)
- Eleventh Hour as Doctor Mal Sheppard (1 episode, 2009)
- Fringe as Joseph Slater (1 episode, 2009)
- CSI: NY as Judge (1 episode, 2010)
- CSI: Crime Scene Investigation as George Stark / (2 episodes, 2003-2010)
- Outsourced (1 episode, 2010)
- Grey's Anatomy as Thatcher Grey (15 episodes, 2006-2019)
- Picture Paris (2011) as Keith
- The Anniversary at Shallow Creek (2011) as Cashier
- The Chicago Code as David Argyle (1 episode, 2011)
- Scandal as Cyrus Beene (2012–2018)
- Lizzie (2018) as Andrew Jennings
- Trial by Fire (2018) as Hurst
- Dirty John (2018) as Michael O'Neil
- Inventing Anna (2022) as Lou
- Alaska Daily (2022) as Stanley
- Bookie as Accountant (1 episode, 2023)
- Monsters: The Lyle and Erik Menendez Story (3 episodes, 2024) as Peter Hoffman
- Chasing Summer (2026) as Randall
