= Olivia Pope =

Fictional character in American TV series "Scandal"

- Scandal character
- First appearance: "Sweet Baby" (1.01); April 5, 2012
- Last appearance: "Over a Cliff" (7.18); April 19, 2018
- Created by: Shonda Rhimes
- Portrayed by: Kerry Washington

In-universe information
- Full name: Olivia Carolyn Pope
- Nicknames: Liv, Livvie; The Fixer
- Occupation: White House Chief of Staff; Lawyer; Crisis manager (Campaign Manager); White House Communications Director; Command of B613
- Family: Elijah Pope (father); Maya Lewis (mother)
- Significant others: Edison Davis (ex-fiancé); Jake Ballard (ex-boyfriend); President Fitzgerald Grant III (boyfriend)

Olivia Carolyn Pope is a fictional character created by Shonda Rhimes for the political drama television series Scandal. This character also played a small role in the series How to Get Away with Murder on its 4th season produced by Shonda Rhimes where she plays a crisis manager who helped Annalise get her class-action case heard by the Supreme Court. The character is partially based on American lawyer, manager and author Judy Smith. In the series, Pope is played as an adult by Kerry Washington and as a child by Yara Shahidi.

Pope is a Washington, D.C.–based crisis manager who runs her own firm, Olivia Pope & Associates (OPA), that specializes in "fixing" political situations and scandals. The character has become a widely watched fashion and style trendsetter.

== Characterization ==
Pope is loosely based on Judy Smith, who served as George H. W. Bush's Deputy Press Secretary and represented Monica Lewinsky during the Clinton-Lewinsky scandal. On Scandal, she is a revered fixer who helped United States President Fitzgerald Grant (played by Tony Goldwyn) win office. Pope is a former lawyer and White House aide. One episode features a scene involving a dossier prepared on Pope's background that reveals her education, having graduated with an A.B. from Princeton University and a J.D. from Georgetown University Law Center. Pope "thinks fast and effectively". Among her secrets is her affair with President Grant. Some of her employees have law degrees, but do not serve as lawyers. Instead, they are "gladiators in suits" who mollify or avert a wide array of crises.

The role is regarded as groundbreaking. According to Felicia Lee of The New York Times, Pope is the only dramatic protagonist role played by a black woman on American network television since 1974, when Teresa Graves starred as Christie Love in Get Christie Love! for one series. Among her prominent comedic predecessors, Diahann Carroll played the title role in Julia from 1968 to 1971. Pope is regarded as a post-racial character, yet possibly the most complex black female lead in television history. Although the show does not touch upon race that often, regarding her much publicized affair with Grant, Pope once said "I'm feeling a little, I don't know, Sally Hemings-Thomas Jefferson about all this." Pope has given Washington a role as a standard bearer for middle-class and upper middle-class, educated black women.

Among women of all races, Washington's Pope is in the stark minority as a female protagonist of a television series who are "emotionally strong, professionally powerful, and personally complicated". Her leadership of a hodge podge crew is compared to that of Brenda Leigh Johnson of The Closer. Pope's "intensity" infuses her team with a "sense of urgency" that gives the show its pace. Her strong, professional, and feminine leadership style is accentuated by her fashion.

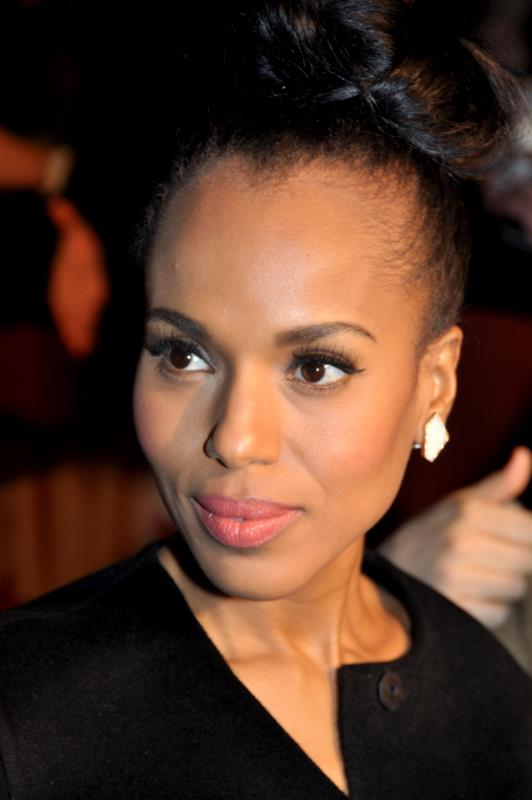
Kerry Washington, who portrays Olivia Pope

Pope's wardrobe is designed by Scandal costume designer Lyn Paolo (known for costume design on The West Wing, ER and Shameless), and it has caught the attention of the Vogue staff. In 2014, Washington's portrayal of Pope and her promotion of Pope's style earned her acclaim as a style influencer from the Accessories Council. Paolo attempted to make Pope stand apart from the black, gray and dark blue colors of DC by outfitting her in "chic pastels" going so far as to put her in pink pants or Louboutin shoes at times. Some of her most respected wardrobe pieces are from notable fashion houses such as Ferragamo, Burberry, Gucci, Armani, Prada, Valentino, Tory Burch, and Michael Kors. The Valentino was saved for the season 1 finale. In addition to the luxurious elements of her wardrobe that are on loan from designers, Pope wears modest elements that Paolo picks up from Nordstrom Rack, Bloomingdale's and Loehmann's. The Pope character has become somewhat of a style icon. Harper's Bazaar and Glamour analyze her wardrobe every week in a dedicated fashion watch columns. Time describes her as "a real-world lifestyle tastemaker", pointing out that the Crate & Barrel wine glasses that she drinks from on the show sold out at the store. Washington and Paolo curated a Saks Fifth Avenue installation of Pope fashions in October 2013. That season, Pope's attire was part of a special collection at Saks Fifth Avenue. In September 2014, an Olivia Pope Scandal collection was set to debut at The Limited, in what was publicized as "the first design collaboration between a national retailer and a top-rated network TV show, its costume designer and star". The collaboration included "tops, pants, jackets and outerwear" and incorporated items priced as low as $49. The collaboration includes 42 pieces. Vulture dedicated a feature to presenting every outfit Pope wore during season 2. When her wardrobe changed to more colorful and asymmetric looks in season 3, The Huffington Post dedicated a feature to this issue. During season 3, Entertainment Weekly ranked Pope's ten best outfits. Because Pope's wardrobe is pricey, there are features and websites dedicated to cheap alternatives to the exact wardrobe elements. Paolo suggests that the Pope style be purchased at Zara and Ann Taylor. In terms of jewelry, Pope wears long necklaces and exclusively wears Movado watches. She also generally uses one of her modest collection of Prada purses.

When the Obama administration needed a spokesman for its Affordable Care Act, it had Jennifer Hudson spoof Pope.

== Storylines ==
=== Season 1 ===
Season 1 introduces Olivia Pope, her "iron-clad rules", and her demands of loyalty. Pope works with her battalion of misfits that she has rescued from assorted affairs of varying amounts of unsavory elements. Episode six, "The Trail", showed the evolution of the affair between Pope and President Grant. However, the entire first season is strung together by Olivia's management of the Amanda Tanner case about "a former White House staffer who claims she’s had a relationship with the President and is carrying his baby". This season presents the beginnings of Beene's constant attempts to manipulate Grant into dumping Pope. The season ends as Pope's and Grant's shared dream of happiness is shattered.

=== Season 2 ===
During season 2, it is revealed that Pope had been involved in an electoral fraud scheme that had ensured Fitz's election. During a break in her relationship with Fitz, Pope develops an emotional and physical attachment to Fitz's Navy colleague Jake Ballard (Scott Foley). Fitz' affair with Pope caused him to become estranged from his wife, Mellie (Bellamy Young), and led to his romantic gesture to move Pope into the White House. However, the season ended with Pope telling Fitz he should go back to his wife and run for reelection after Fitz and Pope were driven apart by White House Chief of Staff Cyrus Beene (Jeff Perry). The season ends with a mysterious relationship with her father, Rowan Pope (Joe Morton), coming to the surface.

=== Season 3 ===
The season begins with Rowan attempting to fix Olivia's personal life and Olivia teaming with Mellie and Fitz for a press conference to reveal the truth about her and Fitz. Olivia and Rowan disagree about the purpose of B613, which Rowan currently heads. Olivia has an emotional history with Huck. She teams with Jake and Huck to expose Operation Remington. Olivia's mother, Maya Lewis (Khandi Alexander), is introduced both in the present day and in flashbacks. Olivia comes to believe that her father had made the decision to kill her mother, which was very different than her prior beliefs about her mother's death. Believing that her father and Fitz conspired to shoot down a plane with her mother on board, Olivia becomes the client of her own firm. It is later revealed that her mother is alive and has been held prisoner by her father in a maximum security prison for 20 years for national security reasons. Lewis escapes. The midseason hiatus from mid-December to late-February left off with Olivia sending her mother abroad. However, Olivia realizes that her mother is a terrorist who married her father for his access to high level intelligence.

=== Season 4 ===
The season focuses on Olivia's return to Washington, D.C., after spending two months relocated on an island off the coast of Zanzibar with Jake, and how her absence has affected the people around her. The first half of the season focuses on Jake's arrest for the death of Jerry Grant after Rowan forces Tom to name Jake as the operator. Rowan continues to try to make everyone believe Jake is guilty, which inspires Olivia to find out the truth for herself. After forcing Tom to reveal Rowan as his operator, Fitz, Jake, and Olivia make a plan to arrest Rowan. Unfortunately, the plan fails, causing Rowan to shut down B613 and start eliminating B613 agents. Olivia tries to kill Rowan when she confronts him, but he manages to flee. The season also focuses on how Olivia Pope & Associates has been closed, which has led Abby, Huck, and Quinn to seek alternative employment. Abby is now the White House Press Secretary, and is struggling with gaining the respect of Cyrus and Fitz, because they choose to demean her by calling her "Red" instead of Abby. Later in the season, Abby finds herself stressed even more by the presence of her abusive ex-husband, who has been nominated for Virginia State Senator, and she enlists Leo Bergen to help ruin his campaign.

=== Season 5 ===
Olivia Pope and Fitz Grant now embrace being a couple, going public with their relationship, thus leading to Olivia taking on many more of the First Lady-established roles in the White House. She continues managing Olivia Pope & Associates, which Marcus Walker becomes a part of, even using it to spin her image once the world looks down on her due to her new relationship with the President. However, by the midpoint of the season she feels too suffocated in this new life, and so she leaves Fitz, the White House, and secretly has an abortion. Olivia returns to her old life, dealing with the aftermath of her and Fitz's break up, and Rowan gets out of jail and reclaims Jake Ballard as his lapdog, while Fitz starts sleeping around and is put in his place by Abby. Meanwhile, Cyrus and Mellie are forced to move on with their lives now that Fitz has kicked them out, Cyrus Beene struggling to figure out what he wishes to do next, and Mellie running for and being elected as a senator, being her next step in making a run for the presidency, which is the main focal point of the second half of the season.

=== Season 6 ===
The entire season centers around the murder of President-elect Francisco Vargas. It is revealed that his wife, Luna Vargas, was behind his murder because she wanted power. The end of season six concludes with Mellie Grant becoming the first female President of the United States. At the end of Fitz's term, he decided to reinstate a B613 and become Command, due to Rowan's manipulation of him. Olivia Pope convinces him not to, because she thinks it will destroy him. Then she has Mellie reserve a percentage of the Pentagon's funds in a blind emergency trust and uses that money to reinstate B613 herself. Olivia becomes Command at the end of the season and considers herself the most powerful person in the world.

=== Season 7 ===
The main story of season seven revolves around Olivia Pope’s new role as Chief of Staff under President Mellie Grant while moonlighting as Command of B613. Meanwhile, Quinn Perkins has taken over leadership of the crisis management firm, renamed QPA, as her and the team try to deal with and contain political scandals. Fitz tries to acclimate to civilian life as he and Marcus work towards building his charitable institution. Everything becomes murky as lives are lost and backs are stabbed leading to the biggest scandal yet.

== Reception ==
"Olivia Pope has the messiest personal life of any character in prime time. And that’s why you’ll probably fall in love with her..." wrote Mark Perigard of The Boston Herald of Pope's character. Time ranked her second on their list of the 11 most influential fictional characters in 2013.

Maureen Ryan of The Huffington Post wrote "Washington does a good job of carrying every story along in her energetic wake, and even if Scandal isn't quite as instantly addictive as Grey's Anatomy..." Washington's simultaneous "emotionally and intellectually acute" presentations are usually showcased in a "fast-talking...eloquent, pointed ... ultimatum (or two) to a client or a nemesis balking over a deal." in each episode.

Stanley says her voice patterns are reminiscent of a salesman in Glengarry Glen Ross. According to Los Angeles Times television critic Mary McNamara, saying the supernaturally empowered Pope is based on Smith is "like saying Willie Wonka [sic] is based on Milton Hershey". McNamara also says "Olivia Pope is not just the ultimate fixer, she also manages to work only on the side of the angels," although she has the sole flaw of loving the married president.

Slate critic Troy Patterson describes her as intellectually comparable to contemporary protagonists Adrian Monk and Gregory House due to her genius powers of intuition, which enable her to judge guilt and veracity by scales in her gut. However, Patterson compares her emotionally to Roy Lichtenstein's romantic subjects such as Drowning Girl despite her angelic swagger and chutzpah.

Staff writer David Hiltbrand of The Philadelphia Inquirer, calls Pope "one of the strongest (in every sense) female characters to hit prime time in recent memory". The Washington Post's Hank Stuever says Pope is a "much-feared" character delivered with a watchability that is "coldhearted but complex".

David Dennis of The Guardian stated that Pope was "a home wrecker" and expressed disdain for the character's lack of morals. He went on to say that Pope's actions were so destructive that she was "barely an anti-hero, much less a hero." Writer Meghan Gallagher of The Artifice considered Pope to be groundbreaking for being among the "first female antiheroes to grace primetime television." She also compared Pope to Tony Soprano, and stated of the character's strengths and weaknesses: "[S]he is a powerful and brilliant woman whose own scheming ambitions get the better of her."

=== Recognition ===
Washington's portrayal of Olivia Pope has garnered mostly positive reviews as well as a Primetime Emmy Award for Outstanding Lead Actress in a Drama Series nomination at both the 65th and 66th Primetime Emmy Awards. The role has also earned Golden Globe Award for Best Actress – Television Series Drama and Screen Actors Guild Award for Outstanding Performance by a Female Actor in a Drama Series nominations. Washington's performance as Pope also won an NAACP Image Award for Outstanding Actress in a Drama Series and a BET Award for Best Actress (also for Broomhilda von Shaft in Django Unchained).
