= List of Scandal episodes =

Listing of episodes of "Scandal"

Scandal is an American political thriller television series created by Shonda Rhimes, that ran on ABC from April 5, 2012 until April 19, 2018.

Kerry Washington stars as Olivia Pope, a former White House Communications Director who leaves to start her own crisis management firm, Pope and Associates, where she works to keep the secrets and protect the public images of the country's most powerful and elite. On staff at the new firm are fresh-faced lawyer Quinn Perkins (Katie Lowes); smooth talking litigator Harrison Wright (Columbus Short); investigator Abby Whelan (Darby Stanchfield); and computer hacker with a CIA past Huck (Guillermo Diaz). The show also focuses on President of the United States Fitzgerald Grant (Tony Goldwyn); First Lady Mellie Grant (Bellamy Young); White House Chief of Staff Cyrus Beene (Jeff Perry); Vice President and eventual presidential candidate Sally Langston (Kate Burton); U.S. Attorney David Rosen (Joshua Malina); Head of NSA, Jake Ballard (Scott Foley); chairwoman Elizabeth North (Portia de Rossi); activist Marcus Walker (Cornelius Smith Jr.); and head of B613 Eli Pope (Joe Morton).

During the course of the series, 124 episodes of Scandal aired, including one special.

== Series overview ==
Season	Episodes	Originally released		Rank	Viewers (in millions)
Season	Episodes	First released	Last released	Rank	Viewers (in millions)
1	7	April 5, 2012	May 17, 2012	62	8.21
2	22	September 27, 2012	May 16, 2013	47	8.46
3	18	October 3, 2013	April 17, 2014	16	12.00
4	22	September 25, 2014	May 14, 2015	18	12.66
5	21	September 24, 2015	May 12, 2016	29	10.68
6	16	January 26, 2017	May 18, 2017	39	8.16
7	18	October 5, 2017	April 19, 2018	53	7.41

== Episodes ==
=== Season 1 (2012) ===
No. overall	No. in season	Title	Directed by	Written by	Original release date	Prod. code	U.S. viewers (millions)
1	1	"Sweet Baby"	Paul McGuigan	Shonda Rhimes	April 5, 2012	101	7.33
2	2	"Dirty Little Secrets"	Roxann Dawson	Heather Mitchell	April 12, 2012	102	7.28
3	3	"Hell Hath No Fury"	Allison Liddi-Brown	Matt Byrne	April 19, 2012	103	7.21
4	4	"Enemy of the State"	Michael Katleman	Richard E. Robbins	April 26, 2012	104	6.86
5	5	"Crash and Burn"	Steve Robin	Mark Wilding	May 3, 2012	105	6.69
6	6	"The Trail"	Tom Verica	Jenna Bans	May 10, 2012	106	6.43
7	7	"Grant: For the People"	Roxann Dawson	Shonda Rhimes	May 17, 2012	107	7.33

=== Season 2 (2012–13) ===
No. overall	No. in season	Title	Directed by	Written by	Original release date	Prod. code	U.S. viewers (millions)
8	1	"White Hat's Off"	Tom Verica	Jenna Bans	September 27, 2012	201	6.74
9	2	"The Other Woman"	Stephen Cragg	Heather Mitchell	October 4, 2012	202	6.56
10	3	"Hunting Season"	Ron Underwood	Matt Byrne	October 18, 2012	203	6.17
11	4	"Beltway Unbuckled"	Mark Tinker	Mark Fish	October 25, 2012	204	6.11
12	5	"All Roads Lead to Fitz"	Steve Robin	Raamla Mohamed	November 8, 2012	205	6.06
13	6	"Spies Like Us"	Bethany Rooney	Chris Van Dusen	November 15, 2012	206	6.02
14	7	"Defiance"	Tom Verica	Peter Noah	November 29, 2012	207	6.64
15	8	"Happy Birthday, Mr. President"	Oliver Bokelberg	Shonda Rhimes	December 6, 2012	208	7.39
16	9	"Blown Away"	Jessica Yu	Mark Wilding	December 13, 2012	209	7.14
17	10	"One for the Dog"	Steve Robin	Heather Mitchell	January 10, 2013	210	8.37
18	11	"A Criminal, a Whore, an Idiot and a Liar"	Stephen Cragg	Mark Fish	January 17, 2013	211	7.93
19	12	"Truth or Consequences"	Jeannot Szwarc	Peter Noah	January 31, 2013	212	8.09
20	13	"Nobody Likes Babies"	Tom Verica	Mark Wilding	February 7, 2013	213	8.14
21	14	"Whiskey Tango Foxtrot"	Mark Tinker	Matt Byrne	February 14, 2013	214	8.02
22	15	"Boom Goes the Dynamite"	Randy Zisk	Jenna Bans	February 21, 2013	215	7.68
23	16	"Top of the Hour"	Steve Robin	Heather Mitchell	March 21, 2013	216	8.51
24	17	"Snake in the Garden"	Ron Underwood	Raamla Mohamed	March 28, 2013	217	7.97
25	18	"Molly, You in Danger, Girl"	Tom Verica	Chris Van Dusen	April 4, 2013	218	8.04
26	19	"Seven Fifty-Two"	Allison Liddi-Brown	Mark Fish	April 25, 2013	219	7.90
27	20	"A Woman Scorned"	Tony Goldwyn	Zahir McGhee	May 2, 2013	220	8.07
28	21	"Any Questions?"	Mark Tinker	Matt Byrne	May 9, 2013	221	8.87
29	22	"White Hat's Back On"	Tom Verica	Shonda Rhimes	May 16, 2013	222	9.12

=== Season 3 (2013–14) ===
No. overall	No. in season	Title	Directed by	Written by	Original release date	Prod. code	U.S. viewers (millions)
30	1	"It's Handled"	Tom Verica	Shonda Rhimes	October 3, 2013	301	10.52
31	2	"Guess Who's Coming to Dinner"	Allison Liddi-Brown	Heather Mitchell	October 10, 2013	302	9.01
32	3	"Mrs. Smith Goes to Washington"	Jeannot Szwarc	Matt Byrne	October 17, 2013	303	9.51
33	4	"Say Hello to My Little Friend"	Oliver Bokelberg	Mark Fish	October 24, 2013	304	8.62
34	5	"More Cattle, Less Bull"	Randy Zisk	Jenna Bans	October 31, 2013	305	9.18
35	6	"Icarus"	Julie Anne Robinson	Peter Noah	November 7, 2013	306	8.66
36	7	"Everything's Coming Up Mellie"	Michael Katleman	Peter Nowalk	November 14, 2013	307	9.04
37	8	"Vermont is for Lovers, Too"	Ava DuVernay	Mark Wilding	November 21, 2013	308	8.93
38	9	"YOLO"	Oliver Bokelberg	Chris Van Dusen	December 5, 2013	309	8.27
39	10	"A Door Marked Exit"	Tom Verica	Zahir McGhee	December 12, 2013	310	9.22
40	11	"Ride, Sally, Ride"	Tom Verica	Raamla Mohamed	February 27, 2014	311	9.32
41	12	"We Do Not Touch the First Ladies"	Oliver Bokelberg	Heather Mitchell	March 6, 2014	312	8.53
42	13	"No Sun on the Horizon"	Randy Zisk	Matt Byrne	March 13, 2014	313	8.22
43	14	"Kiss Kiss Bang Bang"	Paul McCrane	Mark Fish	March 20, 2014	314	9.08
44	15	"Mama Said Knock You Out"	Tony Goldwyn	Zahir McGhee	March 27, 2014	315	9.01
45	16	"The Fluffer"	Jeannot Szwarc	Chris Van Dusen & Raamla Mohamed	April 3, 2014	316	9.13
46	17	"Flesh and Blood"	Debbie Allen	Severiano Canales & Miguel Nolla	April 10, 2014	317	9.23
47	18	"The Price of Free and Fair Elections"	Tom Verica	Shonda Rhimes & Mark Wilding	April 17, 2014	318	10.57

=== Season 4 (2014–15) ===
No. overall	No. in season	Title	Directed by	Written by	Original release date	Prod. code	U.S. viewers (millions)
48	1	"Randy, Red, Superfreak and Julia"	Tom Verica	Shonda Rhimes	September 25, 2014	401	11.96
49	2	"The State of the Union"	Allison Liddi-Brown	Heather Mitchell	October 2, 2014	402	10.34
50	3	"Inside the Bubble"	Randy Zisk	Matt Byrne	October 9, 2014	403	9.52
51	4	"Like Father, Like Daughter"	Paul McCrane	Mark Fish	October 16, 2014	404A	9.90
52	5	"The Key"	Paul McCrane	Chris Van Dusen	October 23, 2014	404B	9.98
53	6	"An Innocent Man"	Jeannot Szwarc	Zahir McGhee	October 30, 2014	405	9.32
54	7	"Baby Made a Mess"	Oliver Bokelberg	Jenna Bans	November 6, 2014	406	9.82
55	8	"The Last Supper"	Julie Anne Robinson	Allan Heinberg	November 13, 2014	407	10.05
56	9	"Where the Sun Don't Shine"	Tony Goldwyn	Mark Wilding	November 20, 2014	408	10.14
57	10	"Run"	Tom Verica	Shonda Rhimes	January 29, 2015	409	10.48
58	11	"Where's the Black Lady?"	Debbie Allen	Raamla Mohamed	February 5, 2015	410	9.58
59	12	"Gladiators Don't Run"	Randy Zisk	Paul Willam Davies	February 12, 2015	411A	9.32
60	13	"No More Blood"	Randy Zisk	Heather Mitchell	February 19, 2015	411B	9.62
61	14	"The Lawn Chair"	Tom Verica	Zahir McGhee	March 5, 2015	412	9.57
62	15	"The Testimony of Diego Muñoz"	Allison Liddi-Brown	Mark Fish	March 12, 2015	413	8.24
63	16	"It's Good to Be Kink"	Paul McCrane	Matt Byrne	March 19, 2015	414	7.79
64	17	"Put a Ring on It"	Regina King	Chris Van Dusen	March 26, 2015	415	8.06
65	18	"Honor Thy Father"	Jeannot Szwarc	Severiano Canales	April 2, 2015	416	7.27
66	19	"I'm Just a Bill"	Debbie Allen	Raamla Mohamed	April 16, 2015	417	7.86
67	20	"First Lady Sings the Blues"	David Rodriguez	Paul William Davies	April 23, 2015	418	7.79
68	21	"A Few Good Women"	Oliver Bokelberg	Severiano Canales & Jess Brownell	May 7, 2015	419	7.44
69	22	"You Can't Take Command"	Tom Verica	Shonda Rhimes & Mark Wilding	May 14, 2015	420	8.08

=== Season 5 (2015–16) ===
No. overall	No. in season	Title	Directed by	Written by	Original release date	Prod. code	U.S. viewers (millions)
70	1	"Heavy Is the Head"	Tom Verica	Shonda Rhimes	September 24, 2015	501	10.25
71	2	"Yes"	Tony Goldwyn	Heather Mitchell	October 1, 2015	502	9.12
72	3	"Paris is Burning"	Jann Turner	Matt Byrne	October 8, 2015	503	8.76
73	4	"Dog-Whistle Politics"	Zetna Fuentes	Mark Fish	October 15, 2015	504	8.06
74	5	"You Got Served"	Kevin Bray	Zahir McGhee	October 22, 2015	505	8.28
75	6	"Get Out of Jail, Free"	Chandra Wilson	Chris Van Dusen	October 29, 2015	506	7.80
76	7	"Even the Devil Deserves a Second Chance"	Oliver Bokelberg	Raamla Mohamed	November 5, 2015	507	8.03
77	8	"Rasputin"	John Terlesky	Paul William Davies	November 12, 2015	508	7.70
78	9	"Baby, It's Cold Outside"	Tom Verica	Mark Wilding	November 19, 2015	509	8.13
79	10	"It's Hard Out Here for a General"	Tom Verica	Severiano Canales	February 11, 2016	510	6.96
80	11	"The Candidate"	Allison Liddi-Brown	Alison Schapker	February 18, 2016	511A	6.09
81	12	"Wild Card"	Allison Liddi-Brown & Tom Verica	Mark Fish	February 25, 2016	511B	5.85
82	13	"The Fish Rots from the Head"	Sharat Raju	Heather Mitchell	March 10, 2016	512	5.97
83	14	"I See You"	Paris Barclay	Matt Byrne	March 17, 2016	513	6.31
84	15	"Pencils Down"	Regina King	Chris Van Dusen	March 24, 2016	514	6.15
85	16	"The Miseducation of Susan Ross"	Scott Foley	Raamla Mohamed	March 31, 2016	516	6.44
86	17	"Thwack!"	Tony Goldwyn	Zahir McGhee	April 7, 2016	517	5.88
87	18	"Till Death Do Us Part"	Steph Green	Paul William Davies	April 21, 2016	518	6.00
88	19	"Buckle Up"	Oliver Bokelberg	Michelle Lirtzman	April 28, 2016	519	6.25
89	20	"Trump Card"	Jann Turner	Severiano Canales & Jess Brownell	May 5, 2016	520	6.06
90	21	"That's My Girl"	Tom Verica	Shonda Rhimes & Mark Wilding	May 12, 2016	521	6.65

=== Season 6 (2017) ===
No. overall	No. in season	Title	Directed by	Written by	Original release date	Prod. code	U.S. viewers (millions)
91	1	"Survival of the Fittest"	Tom Verica	Shonda Rhimes	January 26, 2017	601	7.62
92	2	"Hardball"	Allison Liddi-Brown	Matt Byrne	February 2, 2017	602	6.54
93	3	"Fates Worse Than Death"	Scott Foley	Mark Fish	February 9, 2017	603	6.22
94	4	"The Belt"	Tom Verica	Paul William Davies	February 16, 2017	606	6.06
95	5	"They All Bow Down"	Millicent Shelton	Zahir McGhee	March 9, 2017	604	5.26
96	6	"Extinction"	Tony Goldwyn	Chris Van Dusen	March 16, 2017	605	5.63
97	7	"A Traitor Among Us"	Tom Verica	Alison Schapker	March 23, 2017	607	5.40
98	8	"A Stomach for Blood"	Oliver Bokelberg	Severiano Canales	March 30, 2017	608	6.57
99	9	"Dead in the Water"	Nicole Rubio	Michelle Lirtzman	April 6, 2017	609	5.10
100	10	"The Decision"	Sharat Raju	Johanna Lee	April 13, 2017	610	5.35
101	11	"Trojan Horse"	Jann Turner	Jess Brownell & Nicholas Nardini	April 20, 2017	611	5.11
102	12	"Mercy"	Nzingha Stewart	Severiano Canales & Ameni Rozsa	April 27, 2017	612	5.29
103	13	"The Box"	Steph Green	Raamla Mohamed & Austin Guzman	May 4, 2017	613	5.15
104	14	"Head Games"	Zetna Fuentes	Chris Van Dusen & Juan Carlos Fernandez	May 11, 2017	614	5.10
105	15	"Tick Tock"	Salli Richardson-Whitfield	Zahir McGhee & Michelle Lirtzman	May 18, 2017	615	5.23
106	16	"Transfer of Power"	Tony Goldwyn	Matt Byrne & Mark Fish	May 18, 2017	616	5.23

=== Season 7 (2017–18) ===
No. overall	No. in season	Title	Directed by	Written by	Original release date	Prod. code	U.S. viewers (millions)
107	1	"Watch Me"	Jann Turner	Shonda Rhimes	October 5, 2017	701	5.52
108	2	"Pressing the Flesh"	Tony Goldwyn	Matt Byrne	October 12, 2017	702	5.00
109	3	"Day 101"	Scott Foley	Zahir McGhee	October 19, 2017	703	4.70
110	4	"Lost Girls"	Nicole Rubio	Ameni Rozsa & Austin Guzman	October 26, 2017	704	4.88
111	5	"Adventures in Babysitting"	Oliver Bokelberg	Serveriano Canales & Tia Napolitano	November 2, 2017	705	4.89
112	6	"Vampires and Bloodsuckers"	Jann Turner	Chris Van Dusen & Tia Napolitano	November 9, 2017	706	5.00
113	7	"Something Borrowed"	Sharat Raju	Mark Fish	November 16, 2017	707	4.97
114	8	"Robin"	Daryn Okada	Juan Carlos Fernandez	January 18, 2018	709	5.17
115	9	"Good People"	Nzingha Stewart	Shonda Rhimes, Jess Brownell & Nicholas Nardini	January 25, 2018	708	5.19
116	10	"The People v. Olivia Pope"	Kerry Washington	Ameni Rozsa	February 1, 2018	710	5.62
117	11	"Army of One"	Allison Liddi-Brown	Austin Guzman	February 8, 2018	711	4.63
118	12	"Allow Me to Reintroduce Myself"	Tony Goldwyn	Raamla Mohamed	March 1, 2018	712	4.95
119	13	"Air Force Two"	Valerie Weiss	Severiano Canales	March 8, 2018	713	4.67
120	14	"The List"	Greg Evans	Jess Brownell & Juan Carlos Fernandez	March 15, 2018	714	4.74
121	15	"The Noise"	Darby Stanchfield	Raamla Mohamed & Jeremy Gordon	March 29, 2018	715	3.71
122	16	"People Like Me"	Joe Morton	Chris Van Dusen	April 5, 2018	716	3.83
123	17	"Standing in the Sun"	Jann Turner	Mark Fish & Matt Byrne	April 12, 2018	717	4.15
124	18	"Over a Cliff"	Tom Verica	Shonda Rhimes	April 19, 2018	718	5.46

== Specials ==
No.	Title	Narrator	Aired between	Original release date	US viewers (millions)
1	"The Secret is Out"	Joshua Malina as David Rosen	"White Hat's Back On" (season two) "It's Handled" (season three)	October 3, 2013	5.75

== Webisodes ==
=== Gladiator Wanted ===
A web series debuted prior to the sixth-season premiere and features Guillermo Diaz as Huck, Katie Lowes as Quinn, Cornelius Smith Jr. as Marcus and George Newbern as Charlie. All of the episodes were directed by Darby Stanchfield, who portrays Abby in the show.

No. overall	No. in season	Title	Directed by	Written by	Original release date
1	1	"So You Want to Be a Gladiator in a Suit"	Darby Stanchfield	Juan Carlos Fernandez	January 19, 2017
2	2	"A Job to Kill For"	Darby Stanchfield	Juan Carlos Fernandez	January 19, 2017
3	3	"Induction"	Darby Stanchfield	Juan Carlos Fernandez	January 19, 2017
4	4	"Governments Fall"	Darby Stanchfield	Juan Carlos Fernandez	January 19, 2017
5	5	"By Dawn's Early Light"	Darby Stanchfield	Juan Carlos Fernandez	January 19, 2017
6	6	"Exit Interview"	Darby Stanchfield	Juan Carlos Fernandez	January 19, 2017

== Ratings ==
=== Seasons 1–4 ===
Scandal : U.S. viewers per episode (millions)

Season	Episode number																					
Season	1	2	3	4	5	6	7	8	9	10	11	12	13	14	15	16	17	18	19	20	21	22
1	7.33	7.28	7.21	6.68	6.69	6.43	7.33	–														
2	6.74	6.56	6.17	6.11	6.06	6.02	6.64	7.39	7.14	8.37	7.93	8.09	8.14	8.02	7.68	8.51	7.97	8.04	7.90	8.07	8.87	9.12
3	10.52	9.01	9.51	8.62	9.18	8.66	9.04	8.93	8.27	9.22	9.32	8.53	8.22	9.08	9.01	9.13	9.23	10.57	–			
4	11.96	10.34	9.52	9.90	9.98	9.32	9.82	10.05	10.14	10.48	9.58	9.32	9.62	9.57	8.24	7.79	8.06	7.27	7.86	7.79	7.44	8.08

Audience measurement performed by Nielsen Media Research

=== Seasons 5–7 ===
Scandal : U.S. viewers per episode (millions)

Season	Episode number																				
Season	1	2	3	4	5	6	7	8	9	10	11	12	13	14	15	16	17	18	19	20	21
5	10.25	9.12	8.76	8.06	8.28	7.80	8.03	7.70	8.13	6.96	6.09	5.85	5.97	6.31	6.15	6.44	5.88	6.00	6.25	6.06	6.65
6	7.62	6.54	6.22	6.06	5.26	5.63	5.40	6.57	5.10	5.35	5.11	5.29	5.15	5.10	5.23	5.23	–				
7	5.52	5.00	4.70	4.88	4.89	5.00	4.97	5.17	5.19	5.62	4.63	4.95	4.67	4.74	3.71	3.83	4.15	5.46	–		

Audience measurement performed by Nielsen Media Research
