= Scandal season 4 =

Season of American television series Scandal

Scandal
- Season 4
- DVD cover
- Starring: Kerry Washington; Scott Foley; Darby Stanchfield; Katie Lowes; Guillermo Díaz; Jeff Perry; Joshua Malina; Bellamy Young; Tony Goldwyn
- No. of episodes: 22

Release
- Original network: ABC
- Original release: September 25, 2014 – May 14, 2015

Season chronology
- ← Previous; Season 3 Next → Season 5

The fourth season of the American television drama series Scandal began airing on September 25, 2014, in the United States on ABC and consists of 22 episodes. The season was produced by ABC Studios, in association with ShondaLand Production Company; the showrunner being Shonda Rhimes. On May 7, 2015, ABC announced that Scandal had been renewed for a fifth season.

The season continues the story of Olivia Pope's crisis management firm, Olivia Pope & Associates, and its staff, as well as staff at the White House in Washington, D.C. Season four had nine series regulars, all returning from the previous season, out of which six are part of the original cast of eight regulars from the first season. The season aired at Thursday 9:00 pm, a new timeslot from the three previous seasons which aired an hour later on the same night. The new timeslot was made to make room for ShondaLand Production Company's new TV series, How to Get Away with Murder.

== Overview ==
The season focuses on Olivia's return to Washington, D.C., after spending two months relocated to an island off the coast of Zanzibar with Jake, and how her absence has affected the people around her.

The first half of the season focuses on Jake's arrest for the death of Jerry Grant after Rowan forces Tom to name Jake as the operator. Rowan continues to try to make everyone believe Jake is guilty, which inspires Olivia to find out the truth for herself. After forcing Tom to reveal Rowan as his operator, Fitz, Jake, and Olivia make a plan to arrest Rowan. Unfortunately, the plan fails, causing Rowan to shut down B613 and start eliminating B613 agents. Olivia tries to kill Rowan when she confronts him, but he manages to flee.

The season also focuses on how Olivia Pope & Associates has been closed, which has led Abby, Huck, and Quinn to seek alternative employment.

Abby is now the White House Press Secretary, and is struggling with gaining the respect of Cyrus and Fitz, because they choose to demean her by calling her "Red" instead of Abby. Later in the season, Abby finds herself even more stressed by the presence of her abusive ex-husband, who has been nominated for Virginia State Senator. As a result, she enlists Leo Bergen to help ruin his campaign. Huck is working at an electronic shop and is refusing to return to the firm, but he eventually does. In the past two months, he has been watching his estranged family, but his former wife, Kim, has not allowed him to see his son, Javi. However, much to Kim's dismay, Huck and Javi begin to form a friendship by playing video games together.

Quinn has stayed in contact with both Abby and Huck, in addition to trying to find Olivia. During the first part of the season Quinn works on a case for Olivia's friend Catherine from law school, in which Catherine's daughter was murdered and Catherine's grief-stricken husband committed suicide. The case takes an unexpected twist when Quinn discovers that the killer of Catherine's daughter, Kobiak, has been working with both the head of the RNC, Elizabeth North, and Vice President Andrew Nichols. Their plan is revealed as an attempt to start a war in West Angola. Elizabeth North and Andrew Nichols engineer the kidnapping of Olivia, anticipating that Fitz will do anything to save her. Having predicted correctly, Nichols then successfully convinces Fitz to give the okay to go to war with West Angola.

Mellie struggles with the sudden death of her son, Jerry, at the end of series 3. She finally comes to terms with her loss after finding out that Jerry was murdered due to being deliberately exposed to bacterial meningitis rather than contracting the disease naturally, and she chooses to form an alliance with Elizabeth North. Later, after having an affair with Nichols, Mellie discovers his true nature, when he threatens to tell the press about their affair.

Cyrus starts sleeping with Michael, a male prostitute, who is in Elizabeth North's pay. After finding out that Michael has been leaking information to Elizabeth, Cyrus calls on Olivia for help. As pictures of Cyrus and Michael are leaked, the couple comes up with a plan to get married as a way of handling the crisis.

While Olivia is being held captive, the team that Nichols hired experiences an internal issue leading to its ringleader being killed by Gus, one of his employees. Gus then opens a blackmarket auction for Olivia, and terrorists and foreign nationals start bidding for her. Olivia manipulates the auction to gain the upper hand over the kidnappers, but is unable to stop the auction and is sold to Russia. Stephen Finch, a former Pope & Associates "gladiator" gone for three seasons, returns to rescue Olivia in Russia, and she is safely brought back to America. Shortly after, Nichols suffers a massive stroke, believed to be caused by a collaborative effort between Mellie and Elizabeth. Olivia is visited by Fitz, but reveals her disgust in his decision to go to war to bring her back and drives him away.

Despite the team's concerns regarding her mental and physical state, Olivia chooses to return to her work, starting with a case of an African-American boy who was shot by a white police officer. The team's further investigation finds out that the white police officer set the entire thing up to look like he shot the boy in self-defense, and he is consequently arrested.

Meanwhile, Fitz begins looking for a new vice president. He initially decided to have Mellie take the place, but Cyrus speaks up against it. Mellie later pushes for Virginia Senator Susan Ross to be nominated for the position. Fitz then hires Leo Bergen to assist Susan, but Leo consistently puts pressure on Susan, who decides to quit the race. However, after several considerations, Susan is sworn as vice president.

On receiving files from Huck's estranged wife, David talks to Jake and Huck about what he should do with the files. Huck tries to talk to his wife Kim about them, but she manages to convince Huck to testify. After Huck's testimony, David begins investigating the case. Jake tries his best to stop David, only for David to continue pursuing the investigation, getting help from other B613 agents. David ultimately finds out that his assistant is a B613 agent who has killed other agents as Jake manages to shoot her.

Olivia Pope & Associates continues to handle more cases, such as those of Susanne Thomas and Marcus Walker. Susanne threatens to reveal secrets about D.C.'s top politicians on her new book; while the team was able to eventually convince her not to do so, Huck suddenly kills her. Marcus Walker is accused of murdering the Mayor's wife, with whom he was having affair. The team eventually discovers that Mayor was in fact responsible for the murder, framing Marcus for it. The team convinces the Mayor to step down from his position, but Marcus decides to reveal the truth to the media.

As Susan's seat in the Senate is vacated, Mellie decides to take her place. She enlists Elizabeth to help her in the election campaign. Mellie faces problems in her campaign when her half-sister visits the White House and threatens to reveal her past, but Fitz manages to persuade her not to. Then, former Vice-president Sally Langston raises concerns about Mellie, but Olivia manages to shut her down. Mellie also struggles with initially low ratings in Virginia, and decides to enlist Fitz to help her. Fitz decides to seek advice from Olivia, who also advised him to pick Susan as the new vice-president.

Fitz begins pushing a bill (later known as the Brandon Bill) following the recent shooting near the White House, but is struggling to get it through Congress. He tries to have the bill pushed as soon as possible, but Susan wants to read the entire bill first before giving her vote. With advice from Susan, Fitz eventually decides to improve the bill.

Olivia meets a man named Russell at a bar, and has a one-night stand with him. Meanwhile, Rowan begins threatening Olivia when she and the rest of Olivia Pope & Associates, along with David, begin planning to shut down B613. Russell is later revealed as a B613 agent hired by Rowan to get closer to Olivia, and he attempts to kill Jake when Olivia and the rest of the team continue to defy Rowan. Olivia later realizes this, and has Russell tortured by Huck and Quinn, while helping David with the investigation of B613.

Susan continues to defy the Grant Administration, helping out a female officer who appears to have been raped. She enlists Olivia Pope & Associates to help, and further investigation leads to the revelation that one of the higher officers was responsible for the act. After leaking the video footage, the officer is forced to confess the truth to the media. Mellie then uses the opportunity to raise her ratings, by giving a speech on how the military mishandled the case, showing sympathy for the female officer instead of talking about her son.

Huck and Quinn managed to torture Russell into revealing information about a secret operation named Foxtail, but he escapes before they found out more information. It is later revealed that the lawyer enlisted by the team for the case hearing is a B613 agent, and that he later helped Russell escape only to be killed by Rowan. Operation Foxtail is later revealed to be centered on Mellie, as Rowan generously offers to finance her campaign. The operation was Rowan's escape plan for the case against B613.

In the season finale, members of a grand jury gathered by David for the B613 case are killed after the initial hearing. Olivia Pope & Associates and David begin investigating the scene, and realize that Rowan was responsible. He had also blackmailed Mellie into giving the names of the members, causing her to feel responsible. Cyrus later finds out the truth, but decides not to tell Fitz. After seeking advice from Maya, Olivia and Jake decide to reveal B613 to the CIA, but their plan backfires. They later came up with a plan to frame Rowan for embezzlement of the funds at the museum where he is working, and he is imprisoned. Later, Fitz finds out the truth about what Mellie and Cyrus have done, and he orders them to leave the White House. Elizabeth then takes Cyrus' place as the chief of staff. In the last scene, Fitz reunites with Olivia.

== Cast and characters ==
=== Main ===
- Kerry Washington as Olivia Pope
- Scott Foley as Jacob "Jake" Ballard
- Darby Stanchfield as White House Press Secretary Abigail "Abby" Whelan
- Katie Lowes as Quinn Perkins
- Guillermo Díaz as Diego "Huck" Muñoz
- Jeff Perry as White House Chief of Staff Cyrus Beene
- Joshua Malina as Attorney General David Rosen
- Bellamy Young as First Lady Melody "Mellie" Grant
- Tony Goldwyn as President Fitzgerald "Fitz" Thomas Grant III

=== Recurring ===
- Portia de Rossi as Elizabeth North
- Joe Morton as Rowan "Eli" Pope
- Matthew Del Negro as Michael Ambruso
- George Newbern as Charlie
- Jon Tenney as Vice President Andrew Nichols
- Brian Letscher as Thomas "Tom" Larsen
- Artemis Pebdani as Vice President Susan Ross
- Brian White as Franklin Russell
- Erica Shaffer as News Reporter
- Paul Adelstein as Leo Bergen
- Jasika Nicole as Kimberly "Kim" Muñoz
- Khandi Alexander as Maya Lewis/Marie Wallace
- Jason Butler Harner as Ian Woods/Ian McLeod
- Chad Donella as Gus
- Kate Burton as Sally Langston
- Sharmila Devar as Lauren Wellman
- Cornelius Smith Jr. as Marcus Walker
- Mackenzie Astin as Noah Baker

=== Guest stars ===
- Kelen Coleman as Kate Warner
- Jessica Tuck as Senator Stephanie Vaughn
- Mary McCormack as Lisa Elliot
- Josh Randall as James Elliot
- Sonya Walger as Catherine Winslow
- Mary Mouser as Karen Grant
- Carol Locatell as First Lady Elizabeth "Bitsy" Cooper
- Brian Benben as Leonard Francis Carnehan
- Michael Trucco as State Senator Charles "Chip" Putney
- Robert Baker as Otto
- Marla Gibbs as Rose
- Henry Ian Cusick as Stephen Finch
- Courtney B. Vance as Clarence Parker
- Jimmy Kimmel as himself
- Lena Dunham as Susanne Thomas
- Emily Bergl as Janet Beene
- Dan Bucatinsky as James Novak
- Lauren Bowles as Harmony
- Glenn Morshower as Admiral John Hawley, USN, Commander, United States Fleet Forces Command (USFF)
- Mac Brandt as Captain Weaver, Admiral Hawley's Chief of Staff
- Emily Rios as Ensign Amy Martin, USN, Assistant Communications Officer on the USS Montana
- Dan Byrd as Lieutenant Virgil Plunkett, USN, an inexperienced and inept JAG attorney who is later revealed to be a B613 agent who murdered and then stole the identity of the person of the same name

== Production ==
=== Development ===
Scandal was renewed for a fourth season by ABC on May 9, 2014. On May 13, 2014, ABC announced their new schedule, as well as a new time slot for Scandal. The show remained on Thursday night, but it was moved to 9:00 PM E.T. to make room for ShondaLand Production Company's new TV series, How to Get Away with Murder. In August 2014, ABC programmed its entire Thursday primetime lineup with ShondaLand dramas Grey's Anatomy, Scandal and How To Get Away With Murder, then branded the night as "Thank God It's Thursday" (or "TGIT"). This echoes ABC's former TGIF branding of its Friday night family sitcoms and even NBC's Must See TV promotion of formidable Thursday night television hits in the 1990s.

The remaining fall schedule for ABC was announced on October 30, 2014, where it was announced that Scandal would air nine episodes in the fall with the fall finale to air on November 20, 2014, just like the rest of ABC's primetime lineup "TGIT" Grey's Anatomy and How To Get Away with Murder. The remaining 13 episodes aired after the winter break, beginning on January 29, 2015, and ending with the season finale on May 14, 2015. The show was renewed by ABC for a fifth season, on May 7, 2015.

=== Filming ===
Production started at the beginning of July, as Rhimes tweeted that the writers were hard at work collaborating ideas and mapping out the fourth season. Scouting for the season began a few days later. The table read for the first episode was on July 24, 2014, and Rhimes revealed the title of the premiere the same day. Filming for the fourth season began on July 28, 2014, and ended on April 28, 2015.

=== Writing ===
In an interview with showrunner Shonda Rhimes, she revealed that the fourth season would highlight Darby Stanchfield's character, Abby Whelan. She said "Season 4 is Abby's season. That was by design. A lot of what we know about Abby happens this season." Rhimes also confirmed the speculation about the fate of the character Harrison Wright, who she confirmed was killed. She said that all the people at OPA will cope in different ways to Harrison's death, Olivia the hardest. Rhimes said "It will be very devastating for Abby in a surprising way. You'll see how she's coping with it in a very different way than you would expect." Olivia will deal with her betrayal to everyone she left behind, when she hears about the fate of Harrison. The betrayals changed everyone permanently, and Olivia will have to deal with it.

Shonda Rhimes stated that the fourth season will focus more on the core characters, as opposed to the third season where more characters were introduced. Rhimes explained why: "Kerry Washington couldn't work 14 hours a day, so we had to tell our story in a different way, and that necessitated other people both picking up the slack in beautiful ways".

=== Casting ===
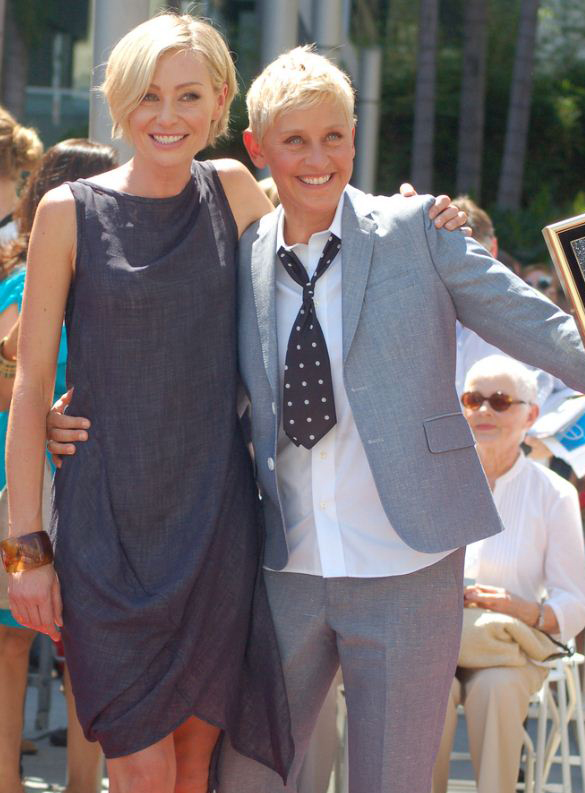
Ellen DeGeneres announced on Twitter that her wife Portia de Rossi was cast for the show.

The fourth season had nine roles receiving star billing, with all of them returning from the previous season, eight of which part of the original cast from the first season. Kerry Washington continued her role as protagonist of the series, Olivia Pope, a former White House Director of Communications with her own crisis management firm. Scott Foley played Captain Jake Ballard, who gets falsely arrested for the murder of the President's son. Darby Stanchfield played Abby Whelan, now the White House Press Secretary after quitting Pope & Associates. Katie Lowes acted as Quinn Perkins, and Guillermo Díaz portrayed the character Huck, the troubled tech guy who works for Olivia. Jeff Perry continued to portray Cyrus Beene, the Chief of Staff at the White House, who gets forced to marry a prostitute to avoid a news scandal. Joshua Malina played David Rosen, former U.S. Attorney, now Attorney General. Bellamy Young continued playing First Lady Melody "Mellie" Grant, who struggles with the death of her son and decides to run for senator of Virginia, while Tony Goldwyn portrayed President Fitzgerald "Fitz" Thomas Grant III.

On April 25, 2014, it was announced that Columbus Short would not return for the fourth season for personal reasons. In an interview with the show's creator Shonda Rhimes, she revealed that Short's character Harrison Wright would be killed off. Television host Ellen DeGeneres revealed on Twitter that her wife, Portia de Rossi, was cast in a multiple-episode "top secret arc".

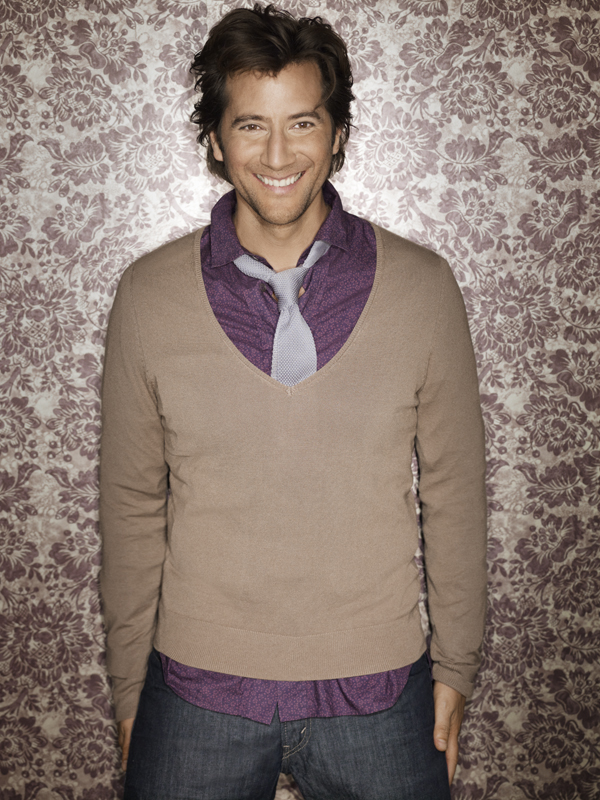
Henry Ian Cusick returned to the series as Stephen Finch after leaving the show after the first season.

Several guest stars were announced to be cast. On July 30, 2014, Kelen Coleman was reported to appear in the season four premiere. On August 12, 2014, Mary McCormack and Josh Randall were announced to appear on the show as a couple, which aired as part of the season's second episode. Lost alum Sonya Walger was announced to appear on the show in a recurring role, on August 18, 2014. On August 22, 2014, Entertainment Weekly announced that Matthew Del Negro will play a recurring role. It was announced that the role of Karen Grant, one of the Grant family's children, would be recast. On September 5, 2014, Mary Mouser was reported to take over the role. The actress Jasika Nicole was announced to return as Huck's estranged wife for the fourth season on October 17, 2014, appearing first in the fifth episode of the season. Stephen Collins announced on Twitter that he would be returning to Scandal for an episode. However, after a news scandal about sexual abuse allegations towards Collins, the actor was cut out of the episode per ABC's request.

Two alums from the Shondaland produced television show Private Practice were announced to appear in the season. Brian Benben was announced on September 16, 2014, to have landed a guest-starring role for the season. Paul Adelstein was announced to return as Leo Bergen on the show in an episode which would air in November.

It was reported on October 21, 2014, that Michael Trucco was cast as Charles Putney, Abby's abusive ex-husband. Information about his character was that he is the youngest son of former Virginia Gov. James Putney and the ex-husband of Abby Whelan after he physically assaulted her in a drunken rage. He will appear in at least one episode of the fourth season. On November 4, 2014, it was announced that Khandi Alexander is going to return as Maya Lewis in the winter finale. Alexander's role was initially meant for only one episode as a guest star, but was upgraded to recurring on November 14, 2014. Jason Butler Harner was cast for the show in a recurring role, and first appeared in the winter premiere, playing Ian Woods. On February 20, 2015, it was reported that comedian Lena Dunham had been cast in an unknown guest role, and will appear in the sixteenth episode. She ultimately portrayed Susanne Thomas, a young woman who writes a scandalous memoir about some of D.C.'s top politicians.

Henry Ian Cusick returned as Stephen Finch after leaving the series after the first season as the character would try and live a normal life with his fiancé Georgia. On March 5, 2015, it was announced that both Kate Burton and Dan Bucatinsky will return playing the characters Sally Langston and James Novak respectively. Both actors appeared in the season's seventeenth episode. Emily Bergl was cast as Cyrus' ex-wife and also appeared in the seventeenth episode. Lauren Bowles was announced to be playing Mellie's half-sister, Harmony. She appeared in the eighteenth episode. After the season finale, it was announced that Portia de Rossi has been promoted to a series regular for the fifth season.

== Broadcast ==
The fourth season began airing September 25, 2014, in the U.S. in a new timeslot as a result of making room for ShondaLand produced show, How to Get Away with Murder. The season premiered at the same time in Canada on City. In the United Kingdom and Ireland, it premiered on Sky Living on January 8, 2015.

== Episodes ==
No. overall	No. in season	Title	Directed by	Written by	Original release date	Prod. code	U.S. viewers (millions)
48	1	"Randy, Red, Superfreak and Julia"	Tom Verica	Shonda Rhimes	September 25, 2014	401	11.96
After two months of living on an island off the coast of Zanzibar with Jake, Olivia comes back to Washington D.C. after learning about Harrison's death. She quickly learns that her former employees have scattered. Quinn still works at OPA, Huck works for an electronics store and Abby is the White House Press Secretary. Olivia tries to make amends while at the same time, helping a Senator with a possible murder. Back at the White House, Fitz and Mellie are still struggling with the loss of their son, Jerry; Fitz at some point tried to commit suicide. As a result, Fitz tries to make a change in his second term by working on an Equal Pay bill which results in him firing most of his cabinet members. Mellie, not coming to terms with her loss, struggles in her everyday life. David Rosen has tried to find a case that can take down political leaders and B613, but has second thoughts when Fitz nominates him for Attorney General. Everyone from Olivia Pope & Associates attends Harrison's funeral, leading both Huck and Quinn back to the company with Olivia.
49	2	"The State of the Union"	Allison Liddi-Brown	Heather Mitchell	October 2, 2014	402	10.34
Cyrus blackmails Olivia into helping him bring back a couple, James and Lisa Elliot, who are considered military heroes, and are supposed to attend Fitz's State of the Union speech about gun control, but they have missed their last two flights from New Mexico. Problems arise when Olivia learns that the couple are having marriage problems, and refuse to attend the speech. Meanwhile, Fitz and Cyrus must deal with a situation when the media begins to be concerned about Mellie's state of mind, and her refusal to go to the event. Abby manages to convince her to attend, but after the speech, where Fitz talks about the loss of his son, she breaks down crying. Meanwhile, Elizabeth, still concerned about Fitz's new direction, hires a man to flirt with Cyrus. David blackmails a senator to keep his nomination for Attorney General and Olivia and Jake's relationship evolves.
50	3	"Inside the Bubble"	Randy Zisk	Matt Byrne	October 9, 2014	403	9.52
Olivia handles a case for a former friend from law school, Catherine, when her daughter goes missing and is later found dead, leaving Olivia suspicious about Catherine. Fitz struggles with his work towards gun control when Elizabeth works against him. Elizabeth tries to stop the process by bribing a judge and having Michael sleep with Cyrus. Meanwhile, Mellie becomes overly invested in a national case in which a man is allegedly pushed by his wife off the cliff of Yosemite National Park, and tries with no success to get the FBI to believe the wife is innocent. Abby tries to handle the situation about Mellie, but Fitz gets in her way. Jake continues his investigation into who killed Harrison and Adnan, involving Quinn to talk to Charlie. He figures out that Rowan was responsible for the deaths. David blackmails the swing judge in the gun control case to win, but feels terrible when the judge commits suicide.
51	4	"Like Father, Like Daughter"	Paul McCrane	Mark Fish	October 16, 2014	404A	9.90
Fitz asks Olivia to shut down a situation that arises when his daughter Karen becomes part of an involuntary sex tape, which could destroy the Grant family's reputation. Olivia does her best to find the video before it is released, but faces trouble when the parents of the boy who made the sex tape demand money in exchange for giving up the video. Meanwhile, Mellie struggles with the situation and with Olivia's presence at the White House, but starts to feel better after a talk with Karen. Fitz finds out from Olivia that she left town with Jake. Jake finds himself in trouble when Rowan sends Tom Larsen to assassinate him after his discovery of how the President's son, Jerry, really died. He is about to reveal the truth to Olivia and the President when he is arrested for the murder of Jerry as Tom was forced by Rowan to falsely accuse Jake of giving him the orders to kill the president's son.
52	5	"The Key"	Paul McCrane	Chris Van Dusen	October 23, 2014	404B	9.98
Olivia and the team continue to investigate Catherine's case, but she is distracted when Jake stops returning her calls. After discovering Jake's last known location was at the White House, Olivia calls Fitz, who indirectly confirms the captivity of Jake at The Pentagon. Fitz tries to make him sign the confession for Jerry's death, but when Jake refuses, Fitz ends up beating him. Rowan manages to convince both Olivia and Cyrus that Jake is the killer, which devastates Olivia. Huck continues to spy on his family, but his estranged wife Kim refuses to let him see his son, Javi. David realizes what it's like to finally be a winner in D.C. and Mellie finds out from Fitz that Jerry was murdered, which helps her to come to terms with her grief.
53	6	"An Innocent Man"	Jeannot Szwarc	Zahir McGhee	October 30, 2014	405	9.32
When a former Republican president dies, Olivia must represent the alleged assassin, Leonard Carnihan, who claims to be innocent and can prove it by matching the bullet to his gun. Olivia manages to make the court allow an autopsy where the bullet is confirmed to be shot from Carnihan's gun, which he wanted everyone to know. Mellie bonds with the former First Lady and widower Bitsy Cooper, after she learns how similar Bitsy's life was to hers. Abby confronts Fitz about Jake, which leads him to transfer Jake to another facility after realizing Olivia still has feelings for him. Elizabeth leaks to the press that Fitz wants to remove military bases in hope of making him seem insecure. Huck finds a way to connect with his son through a video game, and Quinn finds the locker that the key fits, which contains photos of Olivia that Katelyn was murdered for.
54	7	"Baby Made a Mess"	Oliver Bokelberg	Jenna Bans	November 6, 2014	406	9.82
Abby's ex-husband, Charles "Chip" Putney, is nominated for Virginia's U.S. Senator. Olivia tries her best to prevent Chip getting elected and takes over the campaign for Susan Ross, the other Senate nominee, after seeing how devastated Abby is by Chip's nomination. Abby confronts her ex-husband and tells the truth to Leo Bergen about her marriage. Leo ruins Chip's campaign. Olivia visits Tom Larsen in jail, in hope of getting the truth about Jerry's murder. However, due to Tom's obsession with her looks, Olivia goes to extreme measures to get the truth, leading Fitz to release Jake. Cyrus tests Michael to see if he leaks information Cy tells him. Huck continues to play with Javi, which ends with Javi tracking down Huck at the office. Quinn faces problems when Catherine's husband kills himself after she confronts him.
55	8	"The Last Supper"	Julie Anne Robinson	Allan Heinberg	November 13, 2014	407	10.05
Jake, Fitz and Olivia make a plan to take down Rowan, which is to gather enough evidence to prosecute Command and Jake has the secret B613 files. They ask David for help to build a case against Rowan while they try to arrest him. However, the plan fails after Rowan figures out the plan and kills the SWAT-team who were supposed to arrest him, in addition to destroying the B613 files. Meanwhile, an assassination attempt is made on Andrew, making Mellie admit her feelings for him. Elizabeth asks Olivia to find out who is hacking her phone and discovers it is Cyrus. After talking with him about Elizabeth, Olivia decides to spy on her to find out what her plan is. At the stake-out, Huck brings Javi, but they are interrupted when Quinn shows up after following Kobiak to the apartment, where they discover that Kobiak is working with Elizabeth and Vice-President Andrew Nichols.
56	9	"Where the Sun Don't Shine"	Tony Goldwyn	Mark Wilding	November 20, 2014	408	10.14
As a result of almost getting captured, Rowan shuts down B613 and orders the other agents to be killed. Jake teams up with Huck to try to find Command. Rowan confronts Olivia at her apartment, where she points a gun to him and presses the trigger, but the gun isn't loaded; leaving Rowan furious and disappointed that his own daughter would try to shoot him. Meanwhile, after Elizabeth finds out that Olivia covered for Cyrus about hacking her phone, she leaks pictures of Michael and Cyrus together, leading Cyrus to quit as Chief of Staff. Olivia handles the situation by proposing a marriage for Cyrus and Michael and Cyrus agrees. Quinn investigates the connection between Elizabeth, Andrew and Kobiak, where she discovers that they have been planning to start a war between West Angola and the U.S., by setting up the bombing, and kidnapping Olivia to force Fitz to declare a war.
57	10	"Run"	Tom Verica	Shonda Rhimes	January 29, 2015	409	10.48
Olivia is kidnapped by masked men from her apartment and is taken to a demolished building where she is held hostage. She befriends the other man in her chamber, a writer named Ian. As time goes by, Olivia realizes that she might be able to break through the bathroom window, but she is caught in the act by the kidnappers, and as a result, they shoot Ian to punish her. She begins to hallucinate and starts dreaming of Jake and Fitz rescuing her. After a while, Olivia finally manages to attack and kill her kidnappers and unlock the front door. However, she discovers that the building was actually inside a warehouse and that Ian is really behind her kidnapping, and he wants to use her to force Fitz into declaring war against West Angola.
58	11	"Where's the Black Lady?"	Debbie Allen	Raamla Mohamed	February 5, 2015	410	9.58
Fitz discovers that his government has become corrupted by Andrew Nichols, which makes him question who he can trust. Andrew blackmails Fitz into declaring war against West Angola after threatening to kill Olivia. Fitz is sent a video of Olivia talking, which he gives to Jake. After watching the video, Huck discovers a reflection showing Ian's face and realizes that Olivia is leaving them clues to find her. Fitz tells Mellie about the kidnapping, which leads him to declare war – leaving Cyrus and Abby worried about his decision. When a woman comes to OPA searching for Olivia regarding her neighbor, Quinn realizes that the kidnappers hid at Olivia's neighbor's house when they took her. Meanwhile, Olivia convinces Ian to sell her on the open market instead of following orders from Andrew. Mellie gets a hold of Andrew's cellphones, which leads Quinn to find Olivia's destination. However, when they get there, Ian and Olivia have already left on a plane.
59	12	"Gladiators Don't Run"	Randy Zisk	Paul Willam Davies	February 12, 2015	411A	9.32
The auction of Olivia begins on the free market. Fitz and the White House in addition to Jake, Huck and Quinn try to find the auction, but struggle to get access. Jake asks Maya Pope for help by pretending to be Marie Wallace in order to bid on Olivia. Maya asks Huck to kill a handler, which makes Huck begin to unravel, much to Jake's horror. Fitz tries to make Andrew resign as Vice President, but he refuses leading Cyrus to take the situation into his own hands. After Andrew threatens Mellie, by saying that he will reveal their affair together if he gets arrested, she asks Fitz to let Andrew resign as she wants to become the next president. Olivia loses control over her situation when Ian is killed by one of the kidnappers, Gus. He sells her to an outside buyer for more than $1billion, much to Olivia's dismay. Abby finds out that Olivia has been kidnapped and confronts David about it, revealing her anger towards him for not informing her about it.
60	13	"No More Blood"	Randy Zisk	Heather Mitchell	February 19, 2015	411B	9.62
Olivia is about to be handed over to the Iranians when she spoils the deal by misdirecting the kidnappers in English and the Iranians in Farsi. Gus reopens the auction, allowing Huck one more chance to bid on Olivia using Marie's credentials. Meanwhile, Fitz and Cyrus disagree on how to handle the situation, eventually leading Cyrus to plot with the CIA to kill Olivia to prevent international secrets from being leaked. Mellie explains to Fitz that Andrew's blackmail threatens her chance at becoming president herself, and Fitz agrees to let Andrew walk. However, Mellie also plots with Elizabeth to take Andrew down. Olivia is eventually sold to a group in Russia, despite Huck tying for the winning bid. Stephen Finch shows up and reveals he is the Russian that bought Olivia, then brings her back to America, shortly before Andrew has a massive stroke. Fitz goes to Olivia's apartment, but she reveals her disgust at his decision to go to war with West Angola for her, and tells him that she is on her own.
61	14	"The Lawn Chair"	Tom Verica	Zahir McGhee	March 5, 2015	412	9.57
An African-American teenager is shot by a policeman four blocks away from the White House and the police chief calls Olivia for help in handling the situation. Jake worries about Olivia after what she has been through, and advises her to talk to someone. At the crime scene, the father of the dead teenager, Clarence Parker, arrives and stands in front of his son, demanding to talk to the policeman who shot his son Brandon. The situation starts to attract protesters, angered about police brutality. As the situation evolves, Olivia joins the protesters, and tries her best to figure what really happened at the crime scene. With help from Huck and Quinn, Olivia figures out that the policeman who shot the teenager planted a knife to make it look like self-defense, and he is arrested. Fitz tries to find a new Vice President and suggests Mellie, which Cyrus advises him against. Mellie helps Susan Ross to get nominated as VP.
62	15	"The Testimony of Diego Muñoz"	Allison Liddi-Brown	Mark Fish	March 12, 2015	413	8.24
Kim Muñoz, Huck's estranged wife, comes to David for help regarding some B613 files, which shocks David. He discusses the case with Huck and Jake regarding what to do about the files. Huck agrees to talk to Kim. Meanwhile, Fitz hires Leo Bergen to help get Susan Ross appointed as Vice President after she embarrasses herself on TV. The pressure Leo puts on Susan leads her to quit, making Abby furious at Leo. Olivia becomes depressed after recent events, but manages to help Rose finding Olivia's neighbor, whom the kidnappers killed when they took Olivia. Huck and Quinn find the body, and Rose manages to say goodbye to her friend, who she believes died on a park bench. Kim convinces Huck to testify about B613, which he does as he talks about being trapped in the hole – leading David to decide to investigate the case, much to Jake's dismay. After Fitz apologizes to the committee, and with advice from Olivia, Susan Ross is sworn in as Vice President.
63	16	"It's Good to Be Kink"	Paul McCrane	Matt Byrne	March 19, 2015	414	7.79
Susanne Thomas (Lena Dunham), threatens to reveal scandalous secrets about D.C.'s top politicians with a sex memoir. Abby asks Olivia to help her convince Susanne not to publish the book, but she demands $3million in exchange for not publishing. Olivia, Quinn, Huck and Abby tries to figure out who the nicknames belong to in hopes of gathering the men to help pay Susanne. The men all agree to pay, but David protests saying it would be illegal. After finding out that Susanne was fired from her job, Olivia manages to convince her not to publish the book by arranging possible other employment. When Huck and Quinn visit Susanne, Huck kills her fearing she will eventually talk and ruin his chances of a life with his wife and son. Meanwhile, Olivia goes to a bar in search of a man, but she has a flashback to her kidnapping, and leaves the bar alone. Mellie agrees to let Elizabeth become her campaign manager for her running for senator of Virginia, and Fitz and Jake discuss Olivia's condition.
64	17	"Put a Ring on It"	Regina King	Chris Van Dusen	March 26, 2015	415	8.06
Michael is photographed at a strip club with another guy, which creates a news scandal - leading Olivia to push Michael and Cyrus's wedding forward. She asks Mellie for help by suggesting a White House Wedding and Mellie agrees. But after Sally Langston goes on TV saying that the wedding is a cover up, Olivia tries to handle her. Through flashbacks, it is learned that Cyrus married his wife Janet because of his fear of Aids. After she learned about Cyrus being gay, she asked for a divorce. When Cyrus married James, he promised James to not trick him, but soon after broke the promise. Meanwhile, Olivia is still suffering from PTSD after being kidnapped, leading to her dreaming a flashback of Fitz giving her the ring. Her dream leads her to search for the ring. She helps Cyrus get through the wedding and blackmails Sally into keeping quiet saying that her dead husband Daniel Douglas was one of Michael's hooking clients. Olivia wears the ring to Cyrus' wedding which Fitz sees, letting him know she still has feelings for him.
65	18	"Honor Thy Father"	Jeannot Szwarc	Severiano Canales	April 2, 2015	416	7.27
David tries to recruit former B613 agents to strengthen his case, but faces trouble when Jake tries his best to stop him. David gets help from Huck, Quinn and Charlie to help find former B613 agents, but they are later killed. Charlie convinces the others to plot to kill Jake. When David is about to enter the car with his assistant, Jake shows up killing the assistant as she was the one who killed the other B613 agents. Jake reveals he was on board with the case along with Olivia. Mellie's half-sister Harmony visits the White House by request from Elizabeth, but tension starts to rise between the sisters. Fitz manages to talk to Harmony and making sure she won't talk about Mellie's past during Mellie's campaign. Olivia tries to save a Congressman's father from execution for killing his daughter's teacher (who molested her), but Olivia figures out that the Congressman was the real killer. Olivia's one-night stand, Russell, shows up at her door with Rowan Pope.
66	19	"I'm Just a Bill"	Debbie Allen	Raamla Mohamed	April 16, 2015	417	7.86
Rowan threatens Olivia to drop the case against B613, and giving her 48 hours to do so. David refuses to stop the case, to which Olivia agrees, making her more determined to shut down B613. At the same time, Marcus Walker request help from Olivia after being framed for murder of the Mayor's wife, with whom he was sleeping. Olivia finds out that the Mayor was who killed his wife, which Marcus leaks to the media despite the risk of ruining his career. Meanwhile, Fitz struggles to get the Brandon Bill, created after the recent shooting, to get accepted through Congress, but faces trouble when his Vice President refuses to vote before reading properly through the bill - which angers Cyrus and Mellie. After discussing the bill with Susan, Fitz decides to improve the Brandon Bill. As a result of ignoring Rowan's threat, Jake is mortally stabbed by Russell at OPA.
67	20	"First Lady Sings the Blues"	David Rodriguez	Paul William Davies	April 23, 2015	418	7.79
After finding Jake nearly dead, Huck and Quinn manage to revive him. Olivia decides to secure him in a safe house and hires a Russian doctor to help Jake. However, the doctor refuses to help unless Olivia helps his former KGB friend, to which she agrees. Rowan sends Russell to search for Jake, but when he can't find him, he shoots Russell in the arm which makes Olivia visit him at the hospital. They bring Russell to the safe house, where he tries to kill Jake again, but fails. Olivia tries to help the former KGB agent by offering the KGB Rowan Pope. But Rowan kills him and the former KGB and her family. At her apartment, Olivia seduces Russell, only to pull a gun at him revealing she knows that he's B613. Meanwhile, Mellie faces problems when Sally Langston announces her concern about Mellie running for Senator while being the First Lady. Cyrus appears on the talk show, defending Mellie, but Mellie manages to win over voters by exploiting her closeness with Fitz.
68	21	"A Few Good Women"	Oliver Bokelberg	Severiano Canales & Jess Brownell	May 7, 2015	419	7.44
Vice President Ross continues to defy the Grant administration when she hires Olivia Pope to defend a woman, Amy Martin, in the navy who has been raped, and Fitz refuses to get involved with the navy's policy. Amy informs her that she is pregnant and wants an abortion, but the navy refuses to let her leave. Olivia and Quinn manage to get Amy an abortion, and with security footage provided by Abby, Olivia proves that the Admiral raped Amy. The navy story gives Mellie an opportunity as she rallies against the military’s mishandling of sexual assaults instead of talking about Jerry, as Elizabeth suggested. Meanwhile, Huck and Quinn torture Russell for information about a B613 code name "Foxtail", but Russell refuses to talk. The lawyer for the navy, in reality a B613 agent, shows up at the apartment and helps Russell escape. Mellie meets Rowan, unaware that she is "Foxtail", Rowan's escape plan from the case against B613.
69	22	"You Can't Take Command"	Tom Verica	Shonda Rhimes & Mark Wilding	May 14, 2015	420	8.08
The Grand Jury is gathered by David, where Jake and others confess about their roles in B613 and Operation Remington. However, after the initial hearing, every juror is murdered, which Mellie was responsible for after being blackmailed by Rowan, who disguised himself as a billionaire named Damascus in order to get the names of the jurors from Mellie. As she desperately tries to cover it up, she seeks the help of Cyrus. Determined to take down her father, Olivia asks her mother for advice, which leads Olivia to reveal the existence of B613 to the Head of the CIA. Unfortunately, the plan backfires when Olivia and Jake are arrested, only to be released after signing a document denying the existence of B613. Mellie confides in Elizabeth about her actions, which Elizabeth tells Fitz of at Mellie's victory speech. Fitz demands that Mellie move out of the White House residence and fires Cyrus - leaving Elizabeth to take over as the new Chief of Staff. Quinn figures out that Huck killed the Grand Jurors. When she confronts Huck about it, he admits to the killings because his family was threatened by Rowan and asks her to kill him. Olivia has her father arrested for embezzlement from the Smithsonian after Rowan removed Command's identity. Jake says goodbye to Olivia, and Olivia and Fitz reunite on the White House residence's balcony.

== Reception ==
=== Broadcast ===
The season premiere returned with universal acclaim from critics, with many commenting the accomplishment the premiere did to rebound the series after the third season, which many called "messy". The fourth-season premiere also scored a series high in Total Viewers with 11.96 million and in Adults 18–49 with a 3.8/11. The review aggregator website Rotten Tomatoes reports a 95% approval rating with an average rating of 8.10/10 based on 21 reviews. The site's critics consensus reads: "Romantic tensions and twisty plot lines come to a head to create even more chaos in the delicious political fantasy that is Scandal". The series was its ratings increase from week to week compared to its broadcasting last year. The mid-season premiere "Run" was equaled the series's 2nd-highest-ever rating in adults 18–49. The fourth season saw a decrease in the 18-49 key demographic by 5.4 percent to a 2.9, but an increase in total viewers by .86 percent with an average of 9.19 million viewers.

=== Michael Brown reference ===
The series received both praise and criticism for the episode "The Lawn Chair" as it referred to the events in Ferguson, where a black 18-year-old, Michael Brown was fatally shot by Darren Wilson, 28, a white Ferguson policeman. Many praised showrunner Shonda Rhimes for a poignant episode and dialogue that mirrored much of the conversation around the shooting deaths of unarmed black men, whereas many meant it was too soon to air such an episode as it was too emotional and criticized the episode for being unrealistic.

Joshua Alston from The A.V. Club commented that the episode "came across as condescending wish fulfillment", and criticized the episode for not being emotionally true. Aisha Harris from Slate criticized the episode for being too easily to define as she said "Most cases of this nature are not so easily defined—racism and prejudice are often much more covert than that. If only Scandal had been a bit braver in not making Brandon a saint and Newton such an obvious bad guy, it might have made for the realest episode yet." Sophie Gilbert of The Atlantic praised the episode calling it "a tightly controlled and very deliberate exploration of race, identity, bigotry, and conscience." Rhimes explained on Twitter why the episode was more fictive than real as she said "In the end, we went with showing what fulfilling the dream SHOULD mean. The idea of possibility. And the despair we feel now." Lauren Hoffman of Cosmopolitan also criticized the unrealistic element in the episode as she said:

Are there people who will watch the white cop's racist tirade and, because it went unquestioned by any of Scandal's characters, determine that his actions were partially warranted? Will some people assume that the bad cops always go to jail, and that justice is always served? Will people turn off the TV and pretend everything's OK?

Director Ava DuVernay weighed in on the episode as she commented: "An episode like this isn't easy. Isn't easy to write. Isn't easy to direct. Isn't easy to get on air. I appreciate the effort." Judy Smith, the inspiration for Scandal also commented on the episode, saying "Just as a parent protects his child, we all must protect each other."

== Ratings ==
=== Live + SD ratings ===
No. in series	No. in season	Episode	Air date	Time slot (EST)	Rating/Share (18–49)	Viewers (m)	18–49 Rank	Viewership rank	Drama rank
48	1	"Randy, Red, Superfreak and Julia"	September 25, 2014	Thursdays; 9:00 p.m.	3.8/11	11.96	10	15	2
49	2	"The State of the Union"	October 2, 2014	Thursdays; 9:00 p.m.	3.3/10	10.34	8	20	1
50	3	"Inside the Bubble"	October 9, 2014	Thursdays; 9:00 p.m.	3.0/9	9.52	10	23	2
51	4	"Like Father, Like Daughter"	October 16, 2014	Thursdays; 9:00 p.m.	2.9/9	9.90	11	19	1
52	5	"The Key"	October 23, 2014	Thursdays; 9:00 p.m.	3.0/9	9.98	12	20	1
53	6	"An Innocent Man"	October 30, 2014	Thursdays; 9:00 p.m.	3.1/9	9.32	9	23	1
54	7	"Baby Made a Mess"	November 6, 2014	Thursdays; 9:00 p.m.	2.9/8	9.82	8	16	1
55	8	"The Last Supper"	November 13, 2014	Thursdays; 9:00 p.m.	3.2/10	10.05	7	17	1
56	9	"Where the Sun Don't Shine"	November 20, 2014	Thursdays; 9:00 p.m.	3.1/9	10.14	8	18	1
57	10	"Run"	January 29, 2015	Thursdays; 9:00 p.m.	3.6/11	10.48	6	14	3
58	11	"Where's the Black Lady?"	February 5, 2015	Thursdays; 9:00 p.m.	3.2/10	9.58	5	17	2
59	12	"Gladiators Don't Run"	February 12, 2015	Thursdays; 9:00 p.m.	3.1/10	9.32	4	19	2
60	13	"No More Blood"	February 19, 2015	Thursdays; 9:00 p.m.	3.3/10	9.62	6	15	2
61	14	"The Lawn Chair"	March 5, 2015	Thursdays; 9:00 p.m.	3.0/9	9.57	7	17	2
62	15	"The Testimony of Diego Muñoz"	March 12, 2015	Thursdays; 9:00 p.m.	2.7/8	8.24	7	28	2
63	16	"It's Good to Be Kink"	March 19, 2015	Thursdays; 9:00 p.m.	2.4/7	7.79	5	18	2
64	17	"Put a Ring on It"	March 26, 2015	Thursdays; 9:00 p.m.	2.3/7	8.06	8	19	1
65	18	"Honor Thy Father"	April 2, 2015	Thursdays; 9:00 p.m.	2.1/7	7.27	9	27	3
66	19	"I'm Just a Bill"	April 16, 2015	Thursdays; 9:00 p.m.	2.4/7	7.86	5	18	1
67	20	"First Lady Sings the Blues"	April 23, 2015	Thursdays; 9:00 p.m.	2.3/7	7.79	8	28	2
68	21	"A Few Good Women"	May 7, 2015	Thursdays; 9:00 p.m.	2.2/7	7.44	4	21	1
69	22	"You Can't Take Command"	May 14, 2015	Thursdays; 9:00 p.m.	2.3/8	8.08	5	17	1

=== Live + 7-day (DVR) ratings ===
No. in series	No. in season	Episode	Air date	Time slot (EST)	18–49 rating increase	Viewers (millions) increase	Total 18-49	Total viewers (millions)	Ref
48	1	"Randy, Red, Superfreak and Julia"	September 25, 2014	Thursdays; 9:00 p.m.	1.7	4.02	5.5	15.97	
49	2	"The State of the Union"	October 2, 2014	Thursdays; 9:00 p.m.	1.5	3.68	4.8	14.02	
50	3	"Inside the Bubble"	October 9, 2014	Thursdays; 9:00 p.m.	1.7	3.72	4.7	13.24	
51	4	"Like Father, Like Daughter"	October 16, 2014	Thursdays; 9:00 p.m.	1.6	3.72	4.5	13.62	
52	5	"The Key"	October 23, 2014	Thursdays; 9:00 p.m.	1.6	3.84	4.6	13.81	
53	6	"An Innocent Man"	October 30, 2014	Thursdays; 9:00 p.m.	1.4	3.59	4.5	12.91	
54	7	"Baby Made a Mess"	November 6, 2014	Thursdays; 9:00 p.m.	1.8	4.04	4.7	13.86	
55	8	"The Last Supper"	November 13, 2014	Thursdays; 9:00 p.m.	1.7	3.85	4.9	13.91	
56	9	"Where the Sun Don't Shine"	November 20, 2014	Thursdays; 9:00 p.m.	1.6	3.75	4.7	13.90	
57	10	"Run"	January 29, 2015	Thursdays; 9:00 p.m.	1.5	3.56	5.1	14.03	
58	11	"Where's the Black Lady?"	February 5, 2015	Thursdays; 9:00 p.m.	1.7	3.97	4.9	13.55	
59	12	"Gladiators Don't Run"	February 12, 2015	Thursdays; 9:00 p.m.	1.6	3.91	4.7	13.24	
60	13	"No More Blood"	February 19, 2015	Thursdays; 9:00 p.m.	1.6	4.26	4.9	13.89	
61	14	"The Lawn Chair"	March 5, 2015	Thursdays; 9:00 p.m.	1.5	3.74	4.5	13.32	
62	15	"The Testimony of Diego Muñoz"	March 12, 2015	Thursdays; 9:00 p.m.	1.5	3.78	4.2	12.02	
63	16	"It's Good to Be Kink"	March 19, 2015	Thursdays; 9:00 p.m.	1.6	3.92	4.0	11.72	
64	17	"Put a Ring on It"	March 26, 2015	Thursdays; 9:00 p.m.	1.6	3.66	3.9	11.72	
65	18	"Honor Thy Father"	April 2, 2015	Thursdays; 9:00 p.m.	1.6	3.86	3.7	11.12	
66	19	"I'm Just a Bill"	April 16, 2015	Thursdays; 9:00 p.m.	1.5	3.96	3.9	11.78	
67	20	"First Lady Sings the Blues"	April 23, 2015	Thursdays; 9:00 p.m.	1.5	3.71	3.8	11.49	
68	21	"A Few Good Women"	May 7, 2015	Thursdays; 9:00 p.m.	1.3	3.37	3.5	10.80	
69	22	"You Can't Take Command"	May 14, 2015	Thursdays; 9:00 p.m.	1.6	3.92	3.9	12.00	

== Awards and nominations ==
Award	Category	Nominee	Result
BET Award	Best Actress	Kerry Washington	Nominated
NAACP Image Award	Outstanding Drama Series	Scandal	Nominated
NAACP Image Award	Outstanding Actress in a Drama Series	Kerry Washington	Nominated
NAACP Image Award	Outstanding Supporting Actor in a Drama Series	Joe Morton	Won
NAACP Image Award	Outstanding Supporting Actor in a Drama Series	Guillermo Díaz	Nominated
NAACP Image Award	Outstanding Supporting Actress in a Drama Series	Khandi Alexander	Won
OFTA Television Award	Best Actress in a Drama Series	Kerry Washington	Nominated
OFTA Television Award	Best Guest Actress in a Drama Series	Khandi Alexander	Nominated
People's Choice Award	Favorite Network TV Drama	Scandal	Nominated
People's Choice Award	Favorite Dramatic TV Actress	Kerry Washington	Nominated
Creative Arts Emmy Award	Outstanding Guest Actress in a Drama Series	Khandi Alexander	Nominated
Teen Choice Award	Choice TV Actress – Drama	Kerry Washington	Nominated

== DVD release ==
The Complete Fourth Season
Set details	Special features
22 episodes (2 Extended); 5-disc set; English (Dolby Digital 5.1 Surround); English SDH, Spanish and French subtitles; Runtime: 966 minutes	2 Extended Episodes: "No More Blood"; "You Can't Take Command" - With an additional 15 minutes of never-before-seen content.; The Fixer - A Day With Kerry Washington; Outtakes
Release dates
Region 1	Region 2
August 11, 2015	November 23, 2015
