= Where's the Black Lady? =

- Scandal episode
- Fitz declaring war against West-Angola after the orders of Andrew Nichols.
- Episode no.: Season 4 Episode 11
- Directed by: Debbie Allen
- Written by: Raamla Mohamed
- Original air date: February 5, 2015

Guest appearances
- Portia de Rossi as Elizabeth North; Jon Tenney as Andrew Nichols; Jason Butler Harner as Ian Woods; Marla Gibbs as Rose

Episode chronology
← Previous "Run"	Next → "Gladiators Don't Run"
- Scandal (season 4)

"Where's the Black Lady?" is the eleventh episode of the fourth season of Scandal and is the 58th overall episode. It aired on February 5, 2015, in the U.S. on ABC.

== Plot ==
Fitz discovers that his government has become corrupted by Vice President Andrew Nichols, which makes him question whom he can trust. He calls in the joint chiefs for considering war against West-Angola, which shocks Cyrus. Before doing anything, Fitz demands proof of Olivia being alive. As such, Olivia is videotaped saying the demands Andrew has.

Huck visits Elizabeth North at her home, threatening to kill her unless she finds out where Andrew is keeping Olivia. She confronts Andrew about her displeasure of Olivia's kidnapping, but Andrew convinces her to stick with the plan. Fitz demands to see Tom Larsen, to which he asks him about whom he can trust in the government and where to talk privately. He delivers the video of Olivia to Jake in her apartment, as Tom confirmed that it was the only place safe from the Secret Service. Quinn and Huck try to analyze the video, trying to find where she is being kept. They discover a reflection in a glass showing Ian's face, but are interrupted by a woman, named Rose (Marla Gibbs), who wants to talk to Olivia.

After a meeting with the joint chiefs, Cyrus starts to become suspicious of Andrew and Fitz and shares these suspicions with Abby. When the face-scanning fails to match with the reflection in the video, Huck visits Elizabeth and tortures her into making her find out Olivia's whereabouts. Fitz tells Mellie about Olivia's kidnapping, which shocks her. When asking for advice on what to do, Mellie tells him to go along with Andrew's demands. Fitz declares war against West-Angola the next morning, terrifying Olivia. Andrew tells Fitz that he will not let Olivia go before his presidential term is finished.

Rose comes back to Olivia Pope & Associates wanting to talk to Olivia about her neighbor, as she hasn't been answering the door. Quinn realizes that the apartment must have been the place where the kidnappers were when they took Olivia. As they search the apartment, Huck finds Olivia's ring and uses the Internet server to track the kidnappers. He finds out that Otto and Ian are the kidnappers. Cyrus is handed reports about the military invasion, but refuses to take them.

Olivia finds out that Ian is supposed to keep her hostage for the next three years, to the end of Fitz's second term. Therefore, she manages to convince Ian into selling her at the open market as she is highly valuable as the woman who controls the President of the United States. She also tells him to help her get cleaned up.

Elizabeth talks to Mellie about what Huck did to her, which leads Mellie to sleep with Andrew and steal his cellphones. Cyrus finds out about Liv being kidnapped and talks to Fitz about it, but are interrupted by Mellie who informs Fitz that she has taken care of the situation. Quinn and Huck analyze the cellphones and figures out that Olivia is being held at an abandoned airport outside Pennsylvania. Jake gets David to make up a story of a drug raid to have an excuse to infiltrate the building. But when they get there, the airport is empty as Olivia and Ian had already left. Ian calls Fitz from the airplane informing him about the plan of selling Olivia on the open market.

== Cultural references ==
- Tom compares Olivia to the Greek legend Helen of Troy, who was considered to be the most beautiful woman in the world.
- Tom references the famous lines from Christopher Marlowe's play Doctor Faustus: "Was this the face that launch'd a thousand ships."
- Ian mentions American political scandals such as the 2003 invasion of Iraq and the Lewinsky scandal.
- Olivia talks about the open market.

== Production ==
The episode was written by Raamla Mohamed and directed by Debbie Allen. The episode focuses on Fitz's struggle to get Olivia back and not wanting to declare war against West-Angola, in addition to Huck, Quinn and Jake's attempt to find Olivia and Olivia trying to convince Ian to not take orders from Andrew.

It was announced on January 21, 2015 that Marla Gibbs would appear on the show in the eleventh episode.

== Reception ==
=== Broadcasting ===
"Where's the Black Lady?" was originally broadcast on Thursday, February 5, 2015 in the United States on ABC. The episode's total viewership was 9.58 million, up 12 percent from last years 2-telecast after the mid-season return. In the key 18-49 demographic, the episode scored a 3.2/10 in Nielsen ratings, up 11 percent from last year. It was the top TV show in the 9:00 p.m. slot, beating The Blacklist with 35 percent, Two and a Half Men with 48 percent and Backstrom with 210 percent.

The episode's ratings was down from the previous episode, with a 0.90 decrease in total viewers from last episode (10.48) and 14 percent decrease to the installment's 3.6 Nielsen rating in the target 18–49 demographic. The Nielsen score additionally registered the show as the week's second-highest rated drama and fourth-highest rated scripted series in the 18–49 demographic, only behind CBS's The Big Bang Theory (4.6), Fox's Empire (4.6) and ABC's Modern Family (3.4). Seven days of time-shifted viewing added on an additional 1.7 rating points in the 18–49 demographic and 3.97 million viewers, bringing the total viewership for the episode to 13.55 million viewers with a 4.9 Nielsen rating in the 18–49 demographic.
