= Where the Sun Don't Shine =

- Scandal episode
- Jake teaches Olivia how to fire a gun.
- Episode no.: Season 4 Episode 9
- Directed by: Tony Goldwyn
- Written by: Mark Wilding
- Original air date: November 20, 2014

Guest appearances
- Joe Morton as Rowan "Eli" Pope; Portia de Rossi as Elizabeth North; Matthew Del Negro as Michael; Khandi Alexander as Maya Lewis/Marie Wallace

Episode chronology
← Previous "The Last Supper"	Next → "Run"
- Scandal (season 4)

"Where the Sun Don't Shine" is the ninth episode of the fourth season of Scandal, and is the 56th overall episode, serving as the mid-season finale. It aired on November 20, 2014, in the U.S. on ABC.

== Plot ==
As a result of almost capturing Rowan Pope (Joe Morton), he shuts down B613 and orders the killing of his agents. Jake (Scott Foley) is almost killed, and finds a kill-card with his face on. He warns Huck and Quinn (Katie Lowes), which leads Quinn to warn Charlie (George Newbern). However they end up sleeping together, but Quinn finds a kill-card with her face from his pocket, to which she finds out that Charlie was sent to kill her. However, after a fight, Charlie admits that he wasn't going to kill her in addition to inform her about his possession of the B613-files belonging to Jake.

Jake gives Olivia (Kerry Washington) a gun for protection, and goes to a safe-house where he thinks Command might be staying. However, when Olivia comes home, Rowan is there waiting for her with a gun. Olivia tells him that he was never going to leave, as he doesn't want to leave his life behind. This makes Rowan furious of her lack of gratitude of the life he has given her. Olivia manages to get his gun and points to Rowan and pulls the trigger. But the gun isn't loaded, it was only a loyalty test set by Rowan, but Olivia's action makes her father furious and disappointed that his own daughter would try to shoot him. Rowan leaves her, claiming that she would miss him if he died. Olivia goes to her mother to try to get some information about Rowan, but Maya (Khandi Alexander) tells her to move on, as Olivia is too alike her father and she is too obsessed with finding him.

Meanwhile, after finding out that Olivia lied to her, Elizabeth North (Portia de Rossi) leaks revealing photos of Cyrus Beene (Jeff Perry) and Michael (Matthew Del Negro) in bed together, which creates a news scandal. Olivia suggests a marriage agreement between Cyrus and Michael, but Cyrus refuses as it would be a betrayal of James. Cyrus gives Fitz (Tony Goldwyn) his letter of resignation of Chief of Staff, after an emotional interaction between the two. David (Joshua Malina), being the Attorney General, is obligated to investigate the case, where as when he questions Abby (Darby Stanchfield) about an alibi, she reveals that she was with Leo Bergen (Paul Adelstein) - leaving David devastated. Olivia goes to Cyrus at his home and gives him a speech about life and how he needs to pull himself together. She manages to convince him to go along with the marriage agreement, in addition to taking his job back.

Quinn and Huck continue to investigate the Winslow-case after finding out that Elizabeth, Andrew (Jon Tenney) and Kobiak are working together. Quinn breaks into Jeremy Winslow's law firm, by using Kobiak's finger to get past security. She figures out that the law firm has been in contact with West-Angola, in addition to Andrew and Elizabeth being behind the car bombing which led the blame to West-Angola. They discover that the plan was to make a war between the U.S. and West-Angola; however Fitz doesn't declare a war which makes Elizabeth confront Mellie (Bellamy Young). Mellie, however, refuses to take her side as she is hurt by the fact that Elizabeth is sleeping with Andrew. Andrew confronts Fitz, where he reveals his disappointment about Fitz's decision about not wanting to go to war, where he threatens him with hurting Olivia if Fitz does not declare war against West-Angola.

Jake visits Olivia, but to his surprise, she is happy. When he starts talking about Rowan, she refuses to discuss anything more on her father, and instead begins to dance. She informs Jake that she chooses herself, rather than him or Fitz. As Jake is picking up pillows from the bedroom, Olivia is kidnapped.

== Production ==
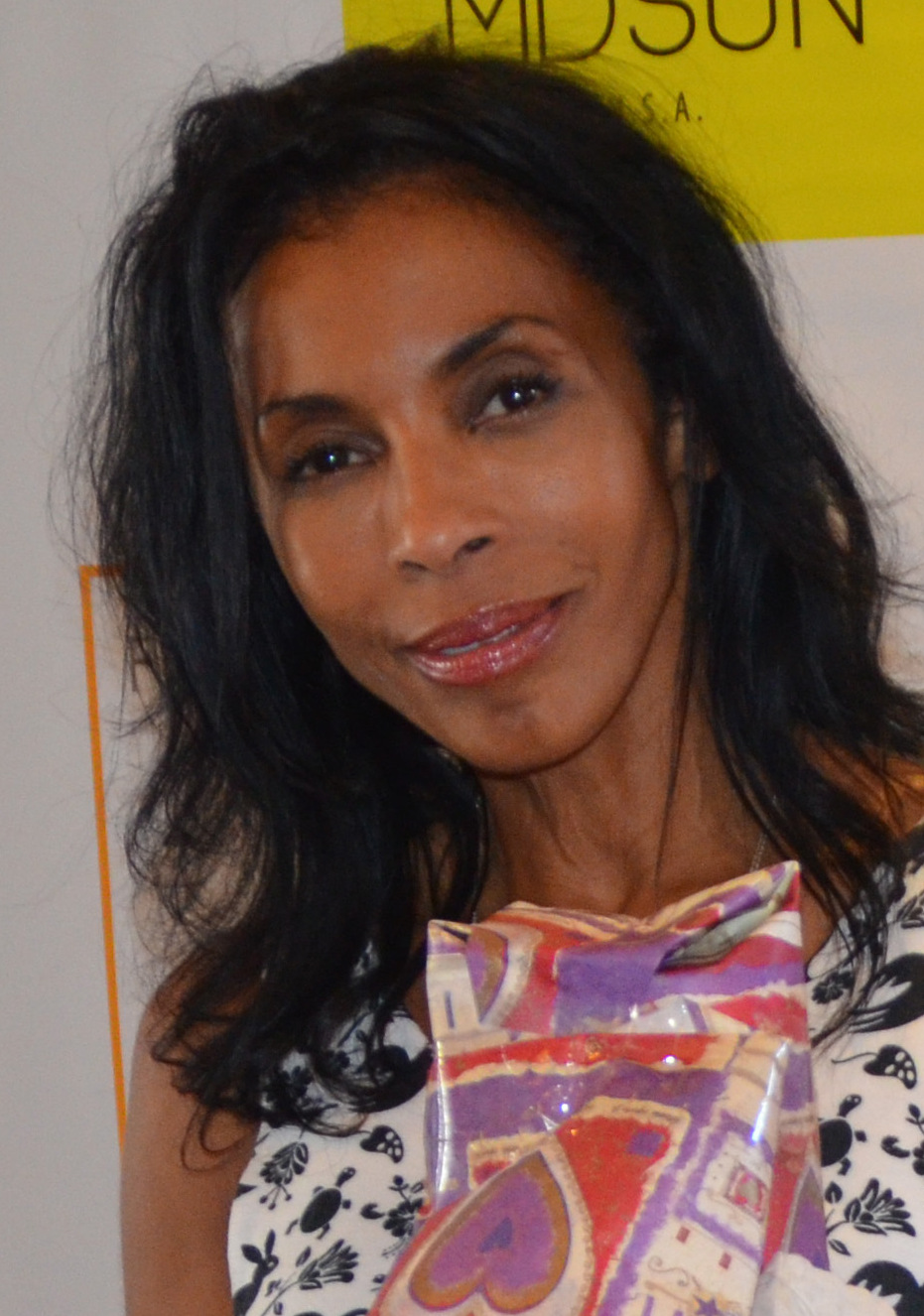
Khandi Alexander returned as Maya Lewis for the episode.

The episode was written by Mark Wilding and directed by Tony Goldwyn. The episode featured the songs "Endless Love" by Lionel Richie and Diana Ross and "Don't You Worry 'bout a Thing" by Stevie Wonder. Showrunner Shonda Rhimes was very pleased to have the song "Endless Love" in the episode, as she said on Twitter: "Placing that song may have been my finest hour. I may be done." The episode focuses on the hunt for arresting Rowan, the scandal that evolves when revealing pictures of Cyrus and Michael is leaked and Quinn and Huck figuring out what Elizabeth and Andrew are planning, in addition to try and solve the Winslow-case.

Preparation for the episode began on October 24, 2014, and scouting began on October 22, 2014, with returning director and regular cast member of the show, Tony Goldwyn, who has directed two other episodes of the show; "A Woman Scorned" and "Mama Said Knock You Out". On November 4, 2014, it was announced that Khandi Alexander was going to return as Maya Lewis in the winter finale. Alexander's role was initially meant for only one episode as a guest star, but was upgraded to recurring on November 14, 2014. Alexander was ultimately nominated for a Primetime Emmy Award for Outstanding Guest Actress in a Drama Series for her performance in the episode.

The remaining fall schedule for ABC was announced on October 30, 2014, where it was announced that Scandal would air nine episodes in the fall with the winter finale to air on November 20, 2014, just like the rest of ABC's primetime lineup "TGIT" Grey's Anatomy and How to Get Away with Murder. The remaining 13 episodes would air after the winter break, beginning on January 29, 2015.

== Reception ==
=== Broadcasting ===
"Where the Sun Don't Shine" was originally broadcast on Thursday, November 20, 2014 in the United States on ABC. The episode's total viewership was 10.14 million, up 13 percent from last year. In the key 18-49 demographic, the episode scored a 3.1 in Nielsen ratings, up 7 percent over their performance at the same point last season, and was the top TV show in the 9:00 p.m. slot, beating Two and a Half Men, Bad Judge, Gracepoint and Reign.

The 10.14 million people tuned into the episode marked a 1 percent viewership increase from the previous episode (10.05 million), but to the installment's 3.1 Nielsen rating in the target 18–49 demographic marked a decline of one tenth from 3.2. The Nielsen score additionally registered the show as the week's highest rated drama and third-highest rated scripted series in the 18–49 demographic, only behind CBS's The Big Bang Theory (4.1) and ABC's Modern Family (3.7). Seven days of time-shifted viewing added on an additional 1.6 rating points in the 18–49 demographic and 3.75 million viewers, bringing the total viewership for the episode to 13.90 million viewers with a 4.7 Nielsen rating in the 18–49 demographic.

=== Critical reception ===
The episode got very positive reviews from critics. Miranda Wicker from TV Fanatic said that the episode felt more like a season finale, rather than a mid-season finale. Cory Baker from TV.com said that the episode was quite successful as a summation of everything that came in the previous eight episodes, in addition to commenting on how the episode dealt with its multitude of stories, which he called impressive.

Joshua Alston from The A.V. Club highlighted Kerry Washington's performance in the episode, as of how many different emotions Olivia goes through, all of which Washington credibly sells. He also commented on Olivia's monologues in the episode, where he highlighted the speech she gives to Cyrus to motivate him, in addition to commenting on the use of the word "bitch baby". Flavorwire writer Judy Berman also commented on the speech calling it another repetition-packed monologue, saying "has a man ever been called a “bitch baby” so many times outside of a dominatrix's dungeon?"

R.B. Philippe from Morning After praised the confrontation between Olivia and Rowan and the actors' performance, saying "Washington and Morton's chemistry is one of the best things about Scandal and even with a full dance-card of presidents and war heroes, her relationship with her father has been the most interesting one this season." Danielle Henderson from Vulture commented on how the confrontation managed to get Olivia to finally be able to come into her own now that she's squared away how she really feels about her parents. The website "Bitch Stole My Remote" also commented on how Olivia got her "mojo" back after shooting blank at her father, which makes her regain control of herself, where she called the scene "the episode's best scene".

Many critics were pleased with Olivia's decision choosing herself over Fitz and Jake. Danielle Henderson from Vulture said "This is the Olivia we’ve been clamoring for all season. She’s not just happy, she’s downright giddy, and basically tells Jake to get onboard or get off the train." Tanya Pai said "Finally, in its winter finale, Scandal gave us the thing we all (or at least I) have been waiting for: Olivia chose herself." Bethonie Butler from The Washington Post said that Olivia took a "Kelly Taylor with choosing herself.
