= Randy, Red, Superfreak and Julia =

- Scandal episode
- The episode introduced the head of RNC, Elizabeth North (Portia de Rossi).
- Episode no.: Season 4 Episode 1
- Directed by: Tom Verica
- Written by: Shonda Rhimes
- Original air date: September 25, 2014

Guest appearances
- Joe Morton as Rowan "Eli" Pope; Portia de Rossi as Elizabeth North; Kelen Coleman as Kate Warner; Jessica Tuck as Senator Stephanie Vaughn

Episode chronology
← Previous "The Price of Free and Fair Elections"	Next → "The State of the Union"
- Scandal (season 4)

"Randy, Red, Superfreak and Julia" is the season premiere of the 4th season of Scandal, and is the 48th overall episode. It premiered on September 25, 2014, in the U.S. on ABC.

The premiere was received with critical acclaim from critics, with many commenting on the improvement from the third season after naming the previous season "messy". On Rotten Tomatoes the premiere got a rating of 100% fresh based on 6 reviews. The episode scored a series high in total viewers with 11.96 millions and in Adults 18-49 with a 3.8/11.

The episode focuses on Olivia's return to Washington, D.C., after being away for two months, and how everything has changed. The episode saw the departure of Columbus Short's character Harrison Wright, who was killed by Tom Larsen at the orders of Rowan Pope. The premiere introduced new characters, played by actors such as Portia de Rossi who was cast in a multiple-episode "top secret arc" starting with the premiere. Kelen Coleman and Matthew Del Negro were also cast for the premiere.

== Plot ==
Two months after president Grant's reelection, Olivia (Kerry Washington) has relocated to an island off the coast of Zanzibar and is living in secrecy with Jake Ballard (Scott Foley) under the name Julia Baker. A mysterious letter arrives with a wine shipment containing only a news clipping on the murder of Harrison Wright (Columbus Short).

Olivia decides to go back to Washington, D.C., with Jake for a few days in order to plan Harrison's funeral. Upon her arrival, she learns that Olivia Pope & Associates is empty except for Quinn (Katie Lowes), who reveals herself as the sender of the letter. Quinn also informs her where the other gladiators have scattered since Olivia left. Huck (Guillermo Diaz), taking the name Randy, is working as a counter clerk at an electronics store and refuses to talk to Quinn or Olivia. Meanwhile, Abby (Darby Stanchfield) is working for the Grant administration as the White House Press Secretary. When Olivia meets Abby, she discovers that Abby blames her for Harrison's death. Olivia gets furious about the accusation, blaming Abby for abandoning the other gladiators for the White House.

As a result of his loss of his son, Jerry, Fitzgerald (Tony Goldwyn) tries to make a change in his presidency by firing most of his cabinet members and pushing a Paycheck Fairness Act, which makes the new head of Republican National Committee (RNC) Elizabeth North (Portia de Rossi) upset. She talks to Cyrus Beene (Jeff Perry) about how the Republican Party is getting impatient with Fitz's policies and "across the aisle" antics, in addition to a nomination of a Democratic Attorney General. She also complains about raising money for campaigns, and how Mellie's (Bellamy Young) erratic behavior and depression since the death of her son has affected public perception.

Jake visits David Rosen (Joshua Malina) to try to find out how far along he has come in his investigation to take down the administration and B613. David tells him that he has labeled the boxes in a color-coded system, but he has stopped working on it. When Cyrus calls David into his office to inform him of the nomination of Attorney General, he has second thoughts of continuing the investigation. However, when he talks to Abby about the nomination, she tells him to take it in order for him to get power which could help him with taking down B613.

While Olivia and Jake are in her apartment the assistant to Senator Stephanie Vaughn (Jessica Tuck) arrives pleading for help for the senator who specifically requested Olivia. When Olivia arrives at the scene, Senator Vaughn informs her she was attacked by Senator Benjamin Sterling and in the process of trying to fight him off she accidentally pushed him over a railing from the second floor. Olivia, realizing that Senator Sterling isn't dead, calls an ambulance and contacts a lawyer to take the case.

Though she claims not to want to be involved in Senator Vaughn's case, Olivia suspects the Senator is lying about being sexually assaulted and demands to know the truth about what happened. With help from Quinn, Olivia realizes that it was the assistant Kate Warner (Kelen Coleman) who was actually assaulted by Senator Sterling. However, she realizes that Senator Vaughn knew that Sterling was attracted to women who looked like Kate and was actually hoping that she would be assaulted so she could blackmail Sterling into supporting the Paycheck Fairness Act.

At Harrison's funeral, Huck, Quinn and Abby join Olivia and Jake to say their goodbyes. As Olivia and Jake hug, Jake spots Rowan (Joe Morton) in a car watching the funeral making him suspicious. At the balcony of the White House, Fitz reveals to Mellie that Olivia is back in town. Despite Fitz's insistence that he has no intention of being unfaithful to her ever again, Mellie asks him to inform her when he does start the affair again.

David is nominated as Attorney General by Fitz, Olivia decides to represent Kate in the investigation of the incident with Senator Sterling, and both Huck and Quinn come back to Olivia Pope & Associates.

== Cultural references ==
- The name "Julia Baker", which Olivia Pope uses as her new name, is a reference to the American sitcom Julia which ran for three seasons from 1968 to 1971, starring American actress and singer Diahann Carroll in the title role. The show was the first television series on American television to star a black woman in a non-stereotypical role.
- The title of the episode, "Randy, Red, Superfreak and Julia", refers to the different names each of the former employees of Olivia Pope & Associates is called in the premiere. "Randy" is the preferred name Huck uses, "Red" is a nickname Cyrus calls Abby, "Superfreak" is a name Abby calls Quinn and "Julia" is the new name Olivia used as she was gone.

== Production ==
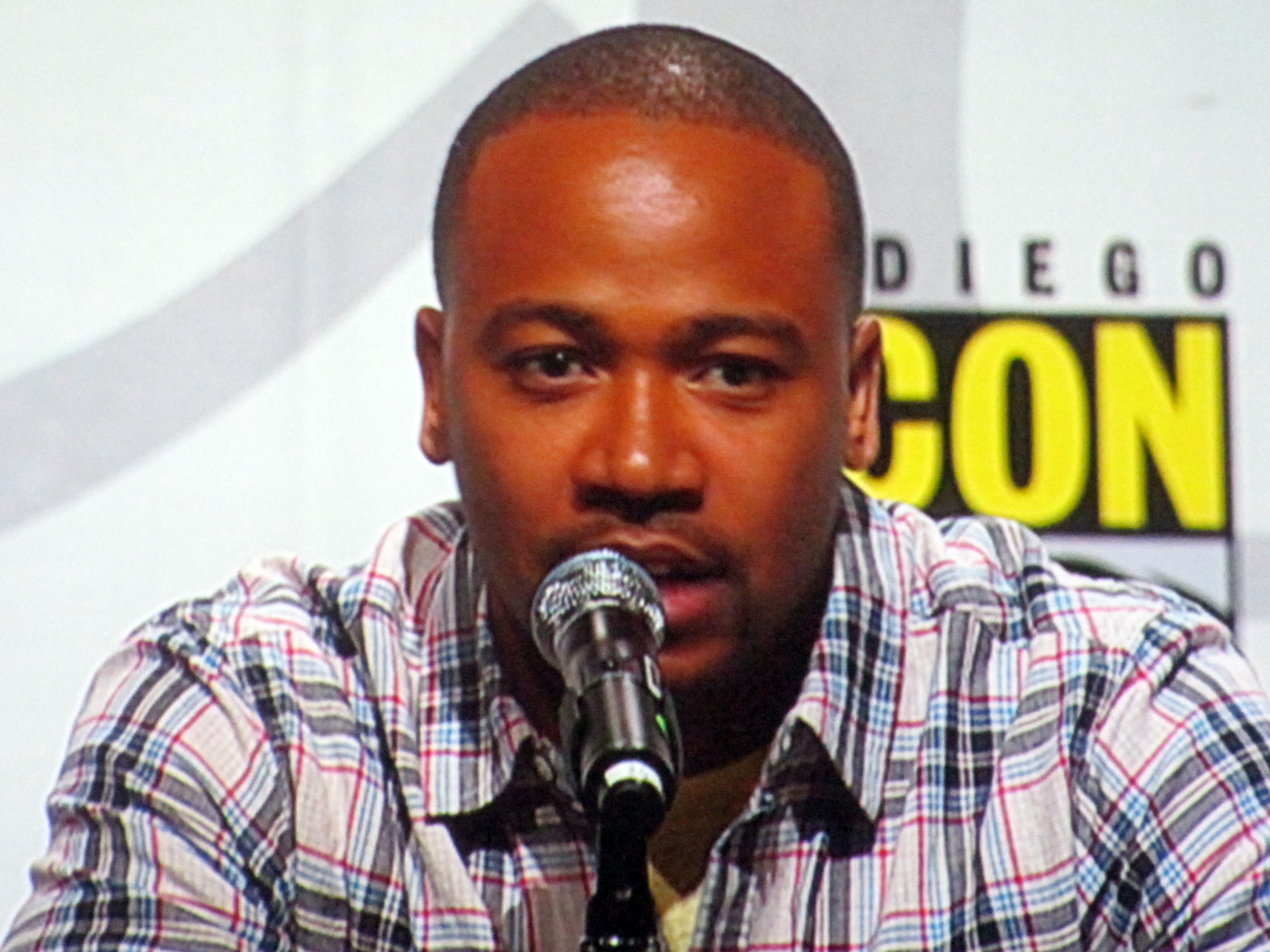
Columbus Short departed the show due to personal reasons.

The episode was written by Shonda Rhimes and directed by executive producer Tom Verica. The episode featured the songs "Sunny" by Bobby Hebb, "Bridge over Troubled Water" by Simon & Garfunkel and "Window". The episode saw the departure of series regular Harrison Wright, played by Columbus Short, as his character was killed off. It was reported that it was for personal reasons that Short did not return for the fourth season. The episode deals with each of the character's grieving the loss of Harrison as well as Olivia Pope's return to Washington, D.C., and how people have changed since her departure. The table read for the premiere was on July 24, 2014, and the episode title was revealed by showrunner Shonda Rhimes the same day. Filming for the premiere began on July 28, 2014.

For the premiere, several castings were announced. Portia de Rossi, was cast in a multiple-episode "top secret arc" starting with the premiere, in which she played the head of the RNC, Elizabeth North. On July 30, 2014, Kelen Coleman was reported to appear in the season four premiere, playing Kate Warner, the assistant of Senator Stephanie Vaughn. On August 22, 2014, Entertainment Weekly announced that Matthew Del Negro would play a recurring role.

On May 13, 2014, ABC announced their new schedule, as well as a new time slot for Scandal. The show remained on Thursday night, but it was moved to 9:00 pm E.T. to make room for ShondaLand Production Company's new TV series, How to Get Away with Murder. In August, 2014, ABC programmed its entire Thursday primetime lineup with ShondaLand dramas Grey's Anatomy, Scandal and How To Get Away With Murder, then branded the night as "Thank God It's Thursday" (or "TGIT"). This echoes ABC's former TGIF branding of its Friday night family sitcoms and even NBC's Must See TV promotion of formidable Thursday night television hits in the 1990s.

== Reception ==
=== Ratings ===
"Randy, Red, Superfreak and Julia" was originally broadcast on Thursday, September 25, 2014, in the United States on ABC. The episode's total viewership of 11.96 million scored a series high in total viewers, and the key 18–34 demographic, the episode earned a 3.8 Nielsen rating, building over the year-ago premiere by 13% and 6%, respectively. The episode was part of the new Thursday lineup branded "Thank God It's Thursday" or "TGIT" on ABC, with lead-in program Grey's Anatomy and lead-out program How to Get Away with Murder which made the Thursday ABC's strongest in viewers and young adults in 5 years - since 9/24/09.

The 11.96 million people tuned into the episode marked a 13 percent viewership increase from the previous season premiere (10.52 million), in addition of the installment's 3.8 Nielsen rating in the target 18–49 demographic marked a 6 percent increase. The Nielsen score additionally registered the show as the week's second-highest rated drama behind the new show How to Get Away with Murder and fourth-highest rated scripted series in the 18–49 demographic, placing behind CBS's The Big Bang Theory (5.4) and (5.4) and Fox's Family Guy (4.5) and ABC's How To Get Away with Murder (3.8). Seven days of time-shifted viewing added on an additional 1.7 rating points in the 18–49 demographic and 4.02 million viewers, bringing the total viewership for the episode to 15.97 million viewers with a 5.5 Nielsen rating in the 18–49 demographic.

In the United Kingdom, the episode was watched by 266,000 viewers over 7 days and 313,000 over 28 days, making it the second most-watched broadcast on Sky Living that week.

=== Critical reviews ===
"It was an oddly muted sign-off for a show that became increasingly unmoored as its third season progressed, but the reasons for season three’s herky-jerky plotting and hyper-compressed pacing are still impossible to untangle."

— Joshua Alston, The A.V. Club

The episode got universal acclaim from critics, as many agreed upon the accomplishment the premiere did to rebound the series after the third season, which many critics called "messy" and "disjoined". Cory Barker from TV.com said "I wanted to see how Shonda Rhimes & Co. would try to rebound from what a messy, disjointed, and frantic third season. And boy, did "Randy, Red, Superfreak, and Julia" rebound".

Miranda Wicker from TV Fanatic called Olivia the glue that holds everything together and her delight of the less focus of Olivia and Fitz's relationship. She said: "The writers clearly want us all rooting for Fitz and Olivia, but this show is about so much more than a love triangle, or it can be. If we choose to let it be about more than that."

Joshua Alston from The A.V. Club mentioned how the storyline about B613 and Maya Pope plots had drained Scandal's resources, and that the premiere made a good job to focus on the core characters of the show. Concluding on his review, he said " "Randy" demonstrated that Scandal, as much as its central character, is wise enough to know when its taken its loyal following over a cliff, and when its time to pull it all back together.
