= Run (Scandal) =

- Scandal episode
- Olivia trying to escape from her kidnappers at the bathroom.
- Episode no.: Season 4 Episode 10
- Directed by: Tom Verica
- Written by: Shonda Rhimes
- Original air date: January 29, 2015

Guest appearances
- Jason Butler Harner as Ian Woods; Robert Baker as Otto; Chad Donella as Gus

Episode chronology
← Previous "Where the Sun Don't Shine"	Next → "Where's the Black Lady?"
- Scandal (season 4)

"Run" is the tenth episode, serving as a mid-season premiere of the fourth season of the American political thriller television series Scandal, and is the 57th overall episode, which aired on ABC on January 29, 2015. The episode was written by showrunner Shonda Rhimes and directed by executive producer Tom Verica. The episode serves as a bottle episode, in which the episode focuses solely on Olivia's kidnapping and her captivity in a jail cell, which she shares with a cellmate named Ian McLeod. The episode features the fewest series regulars of any episode of the series, with only four regulars appearing: Olivia Pope, Jake Ballard, President Fitzgerald "Fitz" Grant lll and Abby Whelan.

Shonda Rhimes praised the episode in an interview in which she named it the best episode of Scandal. She praised the writing, saying, "It is probably my favorite episode that we’ve done, ever. It’s my favorite episode that I’ve written, of anything that I’ve written. But it’s probably our favorite episode that we’ve done ever.”

== Plot ==
Olivia (Kerry Washington) is kidnapped in her apartment by masked men, who take her across the hall to the neighbor apartment. Jake (Scott Foley), believing the kidnappers took Olivia out of the building, runs out to the streets where he runs after a car he believes Olivia is in. While Jake is outside, the kidnappers quickly remove surveillance equipment from Olivia's apartment before Jake returns. Jake calls Huck and Quinn and informs them of the situation.

The kidnappers drive away with Olivia in an ambulance in which one of the kidnappers, Otto (Robert Baker), tells her to beg and negotiate for her release, but Olivia refuses and tells them that she will only talk with the leader of the kidnapping. She is then drugged and passes out. Olivia wakes up in a demolished cell with a cellmate, a man named Ian Woods (Jason Butler Harner), who claims to have been there a long time. He tells her that he is a journalist and was kidnapped after finishing a story in Egypt. Olivia assures Ian that she will get them out of there.

As time goes by, Olivia and Ian begin to bond and share details of each other's lives. One day when she is in the bathroom, Olivia discovers a window and tries to escape through it, but is caught by the kidnappers who, knowing they can't harm her, decide to punish her instead by taking Ian and shooting him.

Olivia, distraught by Ian's murder, begins to have dreams about Jake rescuing her, and her life in Vermont with Fitz (Tony Goldwyn). In her dreams, both Tom Larsen (Brian Letscher) and Abby (Darby Stanchfield) show up to tell her that she does not have anybody to rescue her and that she must rely only on herself.

When she is taken to the bathroom, she tries to escape again out the window, but discovers that the kidnappers cemented it shut. Olivia is devastated and begins to cry. However, she manages to get a hold of a pipe iron and uses it to knock out one of the kidnappers, and steals his keys and gun. She begins to run towards the red door leading out of the building, but is stopped by the other kidnapper, Otto. Olivia, after much hesitation, shoots and kills Otto.

She manages to unlock the red door, but discovers that the small building she is being held in is within a warehouse and that there is no way out. She also discovers that Ian is actually the man holding her hostage as leverage against the president.

== Production ==
The episode was written by showrunner Shonda Rhimes and directed by Tom Verica. Rhimes announced that she would be writing the episode herself and revealed the title of the episode on December 12, 2014. Rhimes deemed the episode the best episode she has ever written, continuing to praise the episode calling it her favorite episode of Scandal. The episode featured the songs "Don't You Worry 'bout a Thing" by Stevie Wonder and "Sunny" by Bobby Hebb. The episode focuses solely on Olivia's kidnapping as she is kidnapped from her apartment and being held hostage in a building for several weeks. The episode also focuses on Olivia's struggles to escape from her kidnappers.

The remaining fall schedule for ABC was announced on October 30, 2014, where it was announced that Scandal would air nine episodes in the fall with the fall finale to air on November 20, 2014, just like the rest of ABC's primetime lineup "TGIT" Grey's Anatomy and How To Get Away with Murder. The remaining 13 episodes was announced to air after the winter break, beginning on January 29, 2015, with the episode "Run".

Scouting for the episode began on November 21, 2014, in Vermont. Filming began on December 2, 2014, and ended on December 12, 2014. It was reported on December 11, 2014, that Jason Butler Harner, known from Alcatraz, Homeland and The Blacklist was cast for the show in a recurring role, which he would first appear in the winter premiere. Robert Baker was cast for the premiere, playing one of Olivia's kidnappers. Baker previously appeared on another show created by Shonda Rhimes in the sixth season of Grey's Anatomy. Scott Foley injured his foot during filming of the episode as he had to run barefoot on the street.

The episode was screened early for TV critics visiting the set of How to Get Away with Murder, and was met with positive critic. Natalie Abrams, a writer for Entertainment Weekly said how exciting the episode was, saying "...I gasped at least 3 times during the first act". Writing for E! Online, Tierney Bricker said it was "an anxiety attack in the best possible way."

== Reception ==
=== Broadcasting ===
"Run" was originally broadcast on Thursday, January 29, 2015 in the United States on ABC. The episode's total viewership was 10.48 million, up 12 percent from last years mid-season return. In the key 18-49 demographic, the episode scored a 3.6 in Nielsen ratings, up 6 percent from last year, scoring the best ratings since the fourth season premiere and is equaled the series's 2nd-highest-ever rating in Adults 18–49. It was the top TV show in the 9:00 p.m. slot, beating Two and a Half Men, Backstrom and Reign.

The 10.48 million people tuned into the episode marked a 3 percent increase from the previous episode (10.14), in addition to the installment's 3.6 Nielsen rating in the target 18–49 demographic marked a 13 percent increase from 3.1, which was from the previous episode. The Nielsen score additionally registered the show as the week's third-highest rated drama and fourth-highest rated scripted series in the 18–49 demographic, only behind NBC's The Blacklist (8.4), CBS's The Big Bang Theory (4.5) and Fox's Empire (4.3). Seven days of time-shifted viewing added on an additional 1.5 rating points in the 18–49 demographic and 3.56 million viewers, bringing the total viewership for the episode to 14.03 million viewers with a 5.1 Nielsen rating in the 18–49 demographic.

=== Critical reception ===
"It’s an amazing thing Shonda Rhimes does here, and a necessary one. No television show suffers more from a midseason hiatus than Scandal, and it was shrewd to craft an entire episode that can stand on its own merits. “Run” is as perfect a place to resume as it is to start fresh."

— Joshua Alston of The A.V. Club

Joshua Alston from The A.V. Club said that if anyone should start to see one episode of Scandal, it should be "Run", which he deemed a standalone episode. He continued saying "No television show suffers more from a midseason hiatus than Scandal, and it was shrewd to craft an entire episode that can stand on its own merits. “Run” is as perfect a place to resume as it is to start fresh." Lauren Piester of E! Online praised Kerry Washington's acting, calling her performance Emmy worthy. She wrote "we would even give her an Oscar for that, since that episode could have been a movie if it were half an hour longer."

Judy Berman of Flavorwire also praised the episode saying "Scandal needed nothing more than to rip itself up and start again — and that’s exactly what last night’s winter premiere accomplished." Lindsey McGhee from Den of Geek called it one of the best episodes of Scandal, and praised Shonda Rhimes saying "This is Shonda Rhimes at her finest, testing her lead character's strengths and pushing her to all possible limits." Cody Barker writing for TV.com said that Scandal needed to do an episode like "Run" as he meant the show had become more predictable and "upholds many familiar conventions, both in its storytelling and it aesthetics." Leigh Raines of TV Fanatic wrote "It seems that Shonda Rhimes has heard her audience's pleas and taken note. After complaints that the first half of Scandal season 4 wasn't quite up to par, she came back in 2015 and killed it." Kirthana Ramisetti from NY Daily News was pleased with the episode saying "At any rate, “Run” was interesting and noteworthy for being one of the rare “Scandal” episodes to solely focus on the main character. But let's hope it remains rare, because the rest of the gang, even Huck and Quinn, were really missed."

Bethonie Butler of The Washington Post called the episode "crazy". She was also more opened about Olivia's decision to reveal her plan to Ian after only knowing him for less than a day. Kat Ward of Entertainment Weekly was more critical towards Olivia and Ian's friendship as she wrote "I know that circumstances can make for strange friends, but Liv and Poor Ian get close very fast." She continued talking about Olivia's belief in Fitz's ability to save her writing "Personally I think that Olivia’s particular faith in her importance is more than a little overblown. Sure, the president loves you, but he’s one man. How much can his love outweigh the needs and feelings of the country he leads?"

Some critics were negative towards the episode for being predictable. Cicely K. Dyson from The Wall Street Journal criticized the episode for not making much sense, but praised Kerry Washington's acting for making the episode enjoyable. Kirthana Ramisetti from NY Daily News called the episode "pretty straightforward in terms of its depiction of Olivia’s ordeal". Virginia Podesta from TV Overmined also called the episode predictable as a regard of the reveal of Ian being the kidnapper all along as she said "Now this is hard for me to admit, but Ian looked suspicious from the beginning." Writing for Vulture, Danielle Henderson expressed her disbelief about Olivia's decisions in the episode saying "For a show that’s all about her gut, she sure has stopped paying any attention to it whatsoever." Heather from Go Fug Yourself criticized the episode calling it a filler. She continued saying "Scandal is nothing if not overly enamored of itself, and in its rabid self-fancying, it gave the game away too early for any of this to feel like anything but filler."
