= Carol Locatell =

American actress (1940–2023)

- Born: December 13, 1940; Atlanta, Georgia, U.S.
- Died: April 11, 2023 (aged 82); Los Angeles, California, U.S.
- Occupation: Actress
- Years active: 1967–2021
- Spouse: Gregory Prestopino

Carol Locatell (December 13, 1940 – April 11, 2023) was an American actress. She was best known for her role in the 1985 slasher film Friday the 13th: A New Beginning as the mean and foul-mouthed Ethel Hubbard who is the farmer neighbor of the facility of where Tommy Jarvis is institutionalized.

== Career ==
Carol Locatell's first movie role was in the 1973 film Coffy. She also appeared in the Burt Reynolds films Paternity, Best Friends and Sharky's Machine. She also has made guest appearances on many television shows, including Bonanza, M*A*S*H, ER, The Practice, 7th Heaven, Touched by an Angel, Without a Trace, and Grey's Anatomy. In 2014, she appeared in "An Innocent Man", season four, episode six of Shonda Rhimes' political drama series, Scandal as former First Lady Bitsy Cooper. Locatell was a prolific theater actress as well, and it was her preferred type of acting. Her most notable theater appearances include The Gin Game in its Los Angeles production in 1976, as well as appearing on Broadway in Broadway Bound in 1986, The Shadow Box in 1994, and The Rose Tattoo in 1995.

== Personal life and death ==
Locatell was born in Atlanta and raised in San Mateo, California. She attended San Francisco State University but dropped out after getting hired for a touring production of The Odd Couple. She was married to musician/songwriter composer Gregory Prestopino. They divided time between in New York City and Thousand Oaks, California.

Locatell died of cancer at her Sherman Oaks home on April 11, 2023, at the age of 82. She was survived by her husband Prestopino, her only immediate survivor.

== Filmography ==
=== Films ===
Films
| Year | Title | Role | Notes |
|---|---|---|---|
| 1973 | Coffy | Priscilla | credited as Carol Lawson |
| 1973 | This Is a Hijack | Jennifer Pierce | credited as Carol Lawson |
| 1973 | The No Mercy Man | Sally Hendricks | credited as Carol Lawson |
| 1974 | Thunder County | | credited as Carol Lawson |
| 1977 | Sammy | Marilyn Redding | |
| 1981 | Paternity | Ms. Werner | |
| 1981 | Sharky's Machine | Mabel | |
| 1982 | Best Friends | Nellie Ballou | |
| 1985 | Friday the 13th: A New Beginning | Ethel Hubbard | |
| 1996 | The Daytrippers | Doris | |
| 2002 | Bug | Supervisor | |
| 2003 | BachelorMan | Mrs. Davis | |
| 2005 | The Family Stone | Jeweler | |
| 2013 | Crystal Lake Memories: The Complete History of Friday the 13th | Herself | Documentary film |
| 2014 | Reality | Lucienne | |
| 2016 | Fishes 'n Loaves: Heaven Sent | Widow Smythe | |
| 2019 | The Way You Look Tonight | MawMaw | |
| 2021 | 13 Fanboy | Carolina Locatelli | |

=== Television ===
Television roles
| Year | Title | Character | Note(s) |
|---|---|---|---|
| 1967 | The Flying Nun | Wife | 1 episode, "Polly Wants a Cracked Head" (as Carol Lawson) |
| 1969 | It Takes a Thief | Girl | 1 episode, "The Great Chess Gambit" (as Carol Lawson) |
| 1969 | Medical Center | Kim | 1 episode, "The Last Ten Yards" (as Carol Lawson) |
| 1970 | McCloud | Receptionist | 1 episode, "Walk in the Dark" (as Carol Lawson) |
| 1970–1972 | Bonanza | Mrs. Holcombe/Etta/Alice | 3 episodes |
| 1971 | Sarge | Anita Roselli | 1 episode, "The Silent Target" (as Carol Lawson) |
| 1971 | The Smith Family | Mrs. Grey | 1 episode, "Family Man" (as Carol Lawson) |
| 1972 | The Bold Ones: The New Doctors | Marcia Wells | 1 episode, "Is This Operation Necessary?" (as Carol Lawson) |
| 1973 | The Streets of San Francisco | Cassandra 'Cassey' Lauritsen | 1 episode, "A Trout in the Milk" (as Carol Lawson) |
| 1973 | Cry Rape | Susan Hadley | TV movie (as Carol Lawson) |
| 1973 | Mannix | Mrs. Slocum | 1 episode, "Desert Run" (as Carol Lawson) |
| 1974 | Barnaby Jones | Mrs. Nelson | 1 episode, "Venus in a Flytrap" (as Carol Lawson) |
| 1974 | Emergency! | Mrs. Wheeler | 1 episode, "" (as Carol Lawson) |
| 1974 | Lucas Tanner | Ann Glazer | 1 episode, "Thirteen Going on Twenty" (as Carol Lawson) |
| 1975 | Bronk | Laura | 1 episode, "Short Fuse" (as Carol Lawson) |
| 1976–1978 | M*A*S*H | Nurse Gaynor | 2 episodes, "The Nurses", "Our Finest Hour" |
| 1977 | Police Woman | Cathy Leonard | 1 episode, "Do You Still Beat Your Wife?" (as Carol Lawson Locatell) |
| 1977 | This Is the Life | Muriel Bates | 1 episode, "So Far from Home" (as Carol Lawson) |
| 1977 | Yesterday's Child | Marie Henley | TV movie |
| 1977 | The Death of Richie | The Nurse | TV movie (as Carol Lawson Locatell) |
| 1982 | Games Mother Never Taught You | Kitty | TV movie |
| 1983 | Happy | Sandy Hanover | TV movie |
| 1984–1985 | Brothers | Flo Waters | 2 episodes |
| 1985 | The Bad Seed | Rita Daigler | TV movie |
| 1986 | Dynasty | Peters | 1 episode, "Focus" |
| 1989 | The Flamingo Kid | Ruth Willis | Television short |
| 1991 | Growing Pains | Lynette Castille-Flechman | 1 episode, "The Young and the Homeless" |
| 1991 | Mathnet | Sylvia Sherwood | 1 episode, "The Case of the Calpurnian Kugel Caper" |
| 1992 | Life Goes On | Ms. Blakeney | 1 episode, "The Wall" |
| 1995 | ER | Landlady | 1 episode, "Do One, Teach One, Kill One" |
| 1996–1997 | The Pretender | Jacob's nurse | 2 episodes |
| 1997 | 7th Heaven | Mrs. Penn | 1 episode, "America's Most Wanted" |
| 1997 | Saved by the Bell: The New Class | Wanda | 1 episode, "Desperately Seeking Work" |
| 1997 | Ally McBeal | Judge Henrietta Fullem | 1 episode, "One Hundred Tears Away" |
| 1997–2003 | NYPD Blue | Jackie Shaughnessy/Iris Clacken | 2 episodes |
| 1998 | Caroline in the City | Frieda | 1 episode, "Caroline and the Bar Mitzvah" |
| 2000 | The Practice | Erica Mathers | 1 episode, "Liberty Bells" |
| 2000 | Family Law | Judge Sydney Miller | 1 episode, "One Mistake" |
| 2000 | Unauthorized: The Mary Kay Letourneau Story | | TV movie |
| 2001 | Touched by an Angel | Eva Silverstein | 1 episode, "Chutzpah" |
| 2003 | The Division | Real Estate Agent | 1 episode, "Cradle Will Rock" |
| 2004 | Without a Trace | Mrs. Reese | 1 episode, "Nickel and Dimed" |
| 2005 | NUMB3RS | Elsie Korfelt | 1 episode, "Assassin" |
| 2008 | Grey's Anatomy | Mai | 1 episode, "Lay Your Hands on Me" |
| 2009 | Bound by a Secret | Madam Wozak | TV movie |
| 2009 | Mad Men | Miss Wakeman | 1 episode, "Guy Walks Into an Advertising Agency" |
| 2010 | Sonny with a Chance | Edith | 1 episode, "Random Acts of Disrespect" |
| 2013 | Parole Officers | Mrs. Monroe | Television short |
| 2014 | Scandal | Bitsy Cooper | 1 episode, "An Innocent Man" |
| 2015 | I Didn't Do It | Carol | 1 episode, "Dog Date Afternoon" |
| 2015 | Battle Creek | Veronica | 1 episode, "Stockholm" |
| 2016 | Jo Jo Head | Grandma | 1 episode, "Grandma, Mom & Me" |
| 2017 | NCIS | Renee Prewdome | 1 episode, "Keep Going" |
| 2018 | Station 19 | Evelyn | 1 episode, "Home to Hold Onto" |
| 2019 | Shameless | Eleanor | 1 episode, "We Few, We Lucky Few, We Band of Gallaghers!" |
