= The Rendezvous (2016 film) =

- theatrical release poster
- Directed by: Amin Matalqa
- Screenplay by: Terrel Seltzer
- Based on: A New Song; 2011 novel by Sarah Isaias
- Produced by: Dan Halsted; Tricia Gibbs
- Starring: Raza Jaffrey; Stana Katic; Alfonso Bassave; Ronald Guttman; Glenn Fleshler; Darby Stanchfield; Nadim Sawalha
- Cinematography: Zoran Popovic
- Edited by: Sasha Dylan Bell
- Music by: Austin Wintory
- Release date: October 8, 2016 (Mill Valley)
- Running time: 92 minutes
- Country: United States
- Language: English

The Rendezvous is a 2016 action-adventure film directed by Amin Matalqa with a screenplay by Terrel Seltzer. It is based on the book A New Song by Sarah Isaias. The film stars Raza Jaffrey, Stana Katic, Alfonso Bassave, Ronald Guttman, Glenn Fleshler, Darby Stanchfield, and Nadim Sawalha.

== Plot ==
Rachel, a Jewish-American doctor, and Jake, an Arab-American government bureaucrat, go on a goose chase across the Middle East trying to solve the mysterious death of Rachel's treasure hunting brother.

From Los Angeles to the deserts of Jordan and the ancient city of Petra, they find themselves hunted by a doomsday group called the Armageddonites who believe Rachel and Jake possess the missing Dead Sea Scroll that could bring about the end of days. Caught in the middle of a plot to hasten the end of mankind, Rachel and Jake need to solve the murder, find the scroll and find trust in each other.

== Cast ==
- Raza Jaffrey as Jake
- Stana Katic as Rachel
- Alfonso Bassave as Beltran Reyes
- Ronald Guttman
- Glenn Fleshler as Conrad Hanley
- Darby Stanchfield as Ruthie
- Nadim Sawalha
- Uma Halsted
- Charles K. Redlinger

== Production ==
In February through to March 2015, director Matalqa scouted Jordan for filming locations which took three weeks before filming began.

Post-production began on June 29, 2015, with Sasha Dylan Bell being announced as the editor on the same day.

On July 17, 2015, Austin Wintory was revealed to be composing the film score.

=== Casting ===
On July 2, 2015, Stana Katic and Raza Jaffrey were officially announced as the leads of the film, after principal photography was completed. Alfonso Bassave, Ronald Guttman, Glenn Fleshler, Darby Stanchfield, and Nadim Sawalha were also officially announced on the same day.

=== Filming ===
Principal photography finished on June 25, 2015. Filming took place in Petra, Jordan, and Los Angeles, United States.

== Screenings ==
The film made its world premiere at the Mill Valley Film Festival in November, 2016, followed by screenings at the St. Louis Film Festival, Havana Film Festival and Lone Star Film Festival. The film recently played at The Heartland Film Festival.
