= No More Blood =

- Scandal episode
- Olivia thanking Stephen for saving her from her kidnappers.
- Episode no.: Season 4 Episode 13
- Directed by: Randy Zisk
- Written by: Heather Mitchell
- Original air date: February 19, 2015

Guest appearances
- Henry Ian Cusick as Stephen Finch; Portia de Rossi as Elizabeth North; Jon Tenney as Andrew Nichols; Khandi Alexander as Maya Lewis/Marie Wallace; Joe Morton as Rowan Pope; Chad Donella as Gus

Episode chronology
← Previous "Gladiators Don't Run"	Next → "The Lawn Chair"
- Scandal (season 4)

"No More Blood" is the thirteenth episode of the fourth season of Scandal, and is the 60th overall episode. It aired on February 19, 2015, in the U.S. on ABC.

== Plot ==
Olivia is about to be handed off to the Iranians when she speaks their language and foils the deal. Gus reopens the auction, allowing Huck one more chance to bid on Olivia using Marie's credentials. Meanwhile, Fitz and Cyrus disagree on how to handle the situation, eventually leading Cyrus to plot with the CIA to kill Olivia to prevent international secrets from being leaked. Mellie explains to Fitz that Andrew's blackmail threatens her chance at becoming President herself, and Fitz agrees to let Andrew walk. However, Mellie also plots with Elizabeth to take Andrew down. Olivia is eventually sold to a group in Russia, despite Huck tying for the winning bid. Stephen Finch shows up and rescues Olivia, then brings her back to America, shortly before Andrew has a massive stroke. Fitz goes to Olivia's apartment, but she reveals her disgust at his decision to go to war with West Angola for her, and tells him that she is on her own.

== Production ==
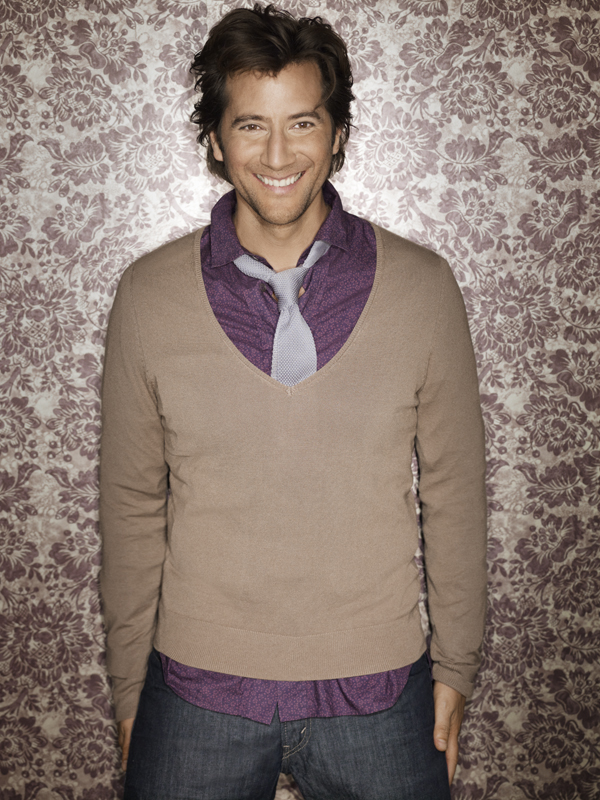
Henry Ian Cusick returned to the series playing Stephen Finch.

The episode was written by Heather Mitchell and directed by Randy Zisk. The episode focuses on the continuing auction of Olivia on the free market and how everyone tries to rescue her. Showrunner Shonda Rhimes explained on Twitter that the twelfth and thirteenth episodes were one extended episode and was therefore divided into two episodes; "Gladiators Don't Run" and "No More Blood".

The episode saw the return of former cast-member Henry Ian Cusick playing the character Stephen Finch, after leaving the show after the first season as the character would be living a normal life with his fiancée Georgia. Shonda Rhimes explained the return saying “It was the only sensible solution when you think about Olivia’s life, where she’s gone and where she’s been". She further explained that the character was the only one Olivia hadn't abandoned and there was no baggage in their relationship. Darby Stanchfield teased the return of Cusick when interviewed about the storyline of the kidnapping of Olivia, saying “There is the most freakin’ hugest surprise that happens in the next four episodes that the original Gladiators are going to freak out over." Katie Lowes also mentioned the twist saying “It’s a real surprise for the original Gladiators, the people who have been here since the beginning. It’s a real OG situation.”

== Reception ==
=== Broadcast ===
"No More Blood" was originally broadcast on Thursday, February 19, 2015 in the United States on ABC. The episode's total viewership was 9.62 million, up 4 percent from its comparable telecast from last year. In the key 18-49 demographic, the episode scored a 3.2/10 in Nielsen ratings, up 10 percent from last year. It was the top TV show in the 9:00 p.m. slot, beating The Blacklist, the series finale of Two and a Half Men, Backstrom and Reign.

The 9.62 million people tuned into the episode marked a 2 percent increase from the previous episode (9.32), in addition to the installment's 3.2 Nielsen rating in the target 18–49 demographic marked a 3 percent increase from 3.1, which was from the previous episode. The Nielsen score additionally registered the show as the week's second-highest rated drama and third-highest rated scripted series in the 18–49 demographic, only behind Fox's Empire and CBS's The Big Bang Theory. Seven days of time-shifted viewing added on an additional 1.6 rating points in the 18–49 demographic and 4.26 million viewers, bringing the total viewership for the episode to 13.89 million viewers with a 4.9 Nielsen rating in the 18–49 demographic.
