= Chris Van Dusen =

American screenwriter

- Education: Emory University; University of Southern California
- Occupations: Television producer, screenwriter
- Spouse: Bryan Van Dusen
- Writing career
- Genre: Television
- Notable work: Bridgerton

Chris Van Dusen is an American television producer and screenwriter. He is the creator and executive producer of the television series Bridgerton, and served as showrunner for seasons one and two.

Van Dusen worked on Grey's Anatomy from 2005 to 2012, and, although uncredited, assisted in the transformation of Grey's Anatomy into its spin-off, Private Practice. He was also a producer and writer on ABC's The Catch and Scandal.

== Personal life ==
A native of Maryland, Van Dusen graduated from Emory University before receiving his M.F.A. at the University of Southern California. He and his husband, Bryan Van Dusen, have three daughters.
