= Mark Fish (writer) =

American actor. writer, and producer

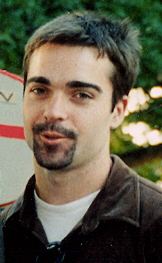
- Education: Harvard University
- Occupations: Actor, television producer and writer
- Years active: 1998–present
- Spouse: Yasemin

Mark Fish is an American television producer and writer and actor.

== Actor ==
Fish has appeared in bit part roles on shows including The O.C., Ed, Law & Order and The Sopranos. He was an actor in the TV show Trinity, and a supporting actor in the film Paging Emma.

== Writer ==
Fish was story editor for Damages and has also written episodes for television shows Scandal, The O.C. and The Inside.
