= Raamla Mohamed =

American television writer

- Born: Los Angeles, California
- Education: Columbia University (BA); USC School of Cinematic Arts (MFA)
- Occupation(s): Television writer, producer
- Notable work: Little Fires Everywhere

Raamla Mohamed is an American television writer known for her work on Little Fires Everywhere and Scandal. She is the creator and showrunner of the Hulu legal drama Reasonable Doubt.

== Biography ==
Mohamed was born and raised in Los Angeles. She graduated from Columbia University in 2003. Originally an economics major, she ended up receiving her B.A. in film and English from Columbia. After a stint working for an Off-Broadway theater in New York City, she went on to receive an MFA from USC School of Cinematic Arts.

She started her industry career at Shondaland. She was first a production assistant on Grey's Anatomy and went on to work as a medical researcher on Off the Map before becoming a researcher on Scandal during season 1.

After Mohamed was accepted into the Disney|ABC Writing Program, she returned to Scandal and joined the writing staff for season 2 and rose through the ranks to become supervising producer.

In 2018, she signed an overall deal with ABC Studios. She was a writer for Little Fires Everywhere, for which she received an Emmy Award nomination. She was also a writer for Still Star-Crossed and developed a pilot for HBO with Issa Rae about black teenagers in the L.A. neighborhood of Windsor Hills.

Most recently, Mohamed is writing and executive producing the Hulu series Reasonable Doubt with Kerry Washington and Larry Wilmore. She also reupped an overall deal with ABC Signature more recently.

== Awards and nominations ==
Mohamed was nominated for the Primetime Emmy Award for Outstanding Limited or Anthology Series in 2020 for her work on Little Fires Everywhere. She was also nominated for two Black Reel Awards for Television and a Writers Guild of America Award for Television: Long Form – Adapted for her work on the limited series.
