= Abby Whelan =

Character on American television series Scandal

- Scandal character
- Darby Stanchfield as Abby Whelan
- First appearance: "Sweet Baby" (episode 1.01)
- Last appearance: "Over a Cliff" (episode 7.18)
- Created by: Shonda Rhimes
- Portrayed by: Darby Stanchfield

In-universe information
- Full name: Abigail "Abby" Whelan
- Nickname: Red, Gabby
- Occupation: Lawyer; Crisis manager Investigator; White House Press Secretary; White House Chief of Staff

Abigail Whelan is a fictional character portrayed by Darby Stanchfield, created by Shonda Rhimes for the political drama television series Scandal. Whelan is Jewish, worked in the Washington, D.C.–based crisis management-firm, Pope & Associates, that specializes in political situations. She now works as the White House Chief of Staff.

== Background ==
Abby Whelan was married to Charles "Chip" Putney, the youngest son of the former Governor of Virginia James Putney. The marriage was an arranged political marriage. The couple faced problems when Charles physically assaulted Abby in a drunken rage. She left him after he fractured three of her ribs, broke her jaw and threw her out into the snow. Olivia came to Abby's rescue and clubbed Putney in the knees with a tire iron. Olivia proceeded to get Abby the best divorce attorney in the state, which successfully led to Abby getting a divorce.

== Storylines ==
=== Season 1 ===
In the first season, Abby is seen working at the crisis management-firm, Pope & Associates, led by Olivia Pope. She works alongside her colleagues Harrison Wright, Stephen Finch, Huck and newcomer Quinn Perkins. Through the first season, Abby starts to have feelings toward Stephen. She is jealous when finding out that Stephen was one of the clients of DC's finest madam, Sharon Marquette. Abby is an investigator at the firm and frequently visits crime scenes to help find evidence. In the fourth episode, a South American dictator comes to Pope & Associates for help finding his family because he believes they have been kidnapped. Abby and Stephen find out that the wife of the dictator actually ran away and checked into a hotel to get away from her husband. Abby shows strong feelings for not wanting to take the wife back to her husband, as the situation reminds her of her ex-husband who used to beat her. She manage to convince Olivia to help the wife leave her husband.

=== Season 2 ===
In the second season, Abby begins a relationship with the U.S. District attorney David Rosen, despite her colleagues skepticism. She begins to assist in David's investigation of Olivia after she feels betrayed by Olivia's decision about getting Quinn out of jail. However, the relationship ends when Abby finds out that David had an ex-girlfriend who filed charges against him after he allegedly beat her. It is revealed that Olivia and Harrison paid David's ex-girlfriend to file the charge in a deliberate effort to drive a wedge between David and Abby.

=== Season 4 ===
After Olivia left with Jake Ballard, Abby quit Pope & Associates and began working at the White House as the White House Press Secretary. When Olivia comes back to plan Harrison's funeral, she meets up with Abby. Olivia learns just how betrayed Abby feels about her decision to leave, with Abby blaming her for Harrison's death. At the White House, she struggles to earn the respect of Fitz and Cyrus as they start calling her nicknames. In addition she tries to help Mellie with her grief over the death of her son Jerry Grant Jr.

Abby's ex-husband, Charles "Chip" Putney, comes to the White House when he is nominated for Virginia's U.S. Senator, which devastates Abby. Olivia helps Abby by working on the campaign of the other nomination, Susan Ross, and successfully getting her elected Senator. Abby confronts Charles with a gun and he backs off, which finally gives her closure about her marriage. She also becomes closer with Leo Bergen after he ruins Charles' campaign. When revealing pictures of Cyrus and Michael hit the news, Abby must control the press. After the news scandal is over, Abby finally earns respect from Fitz and Cyrus.

When Olivia is kidnapped, Abby is shot out of the situation unknowing of Olivia's abduction. She begins to become suspicious when Olivia won't answer her phone. She confronts Huck and Quinn about it. However, they say nothing. When she finally finds out that Olivia is kidnapped, she confronts David about it letting him know her frustration about keeping the information from her. Abby gets help from Interpol to track down Stephen Finch to ask him for help rescuing Olivia which he does.

== Relationships ==
=== Olivia Pope ===
Abby is very loyal to Olivia after Olivia helped her divorce her husband Charles Putney who fractured three of her ribs, broke her jaw and threw her out into the snow. After clubbing Charles in the knees with a tire iron, Olivia hires the best attorney to assist with Abby's divorce. After the divorce, Abby stays with Olivia, and works with her on the presidential campaign for Governor Fitzgerald "Fitz" Grant III. When Olivia began her own crisis-management firm, Abby began working for Olivia.

Their relationship begins to change in the first season after Quinn starts at the firm, and Olivia starts to exclude her colleagues from important decisions. In one episode, a wife of a South American dictator wants to leave her husband, Abby convinces Olivia to help the wife. When Quinn's boyfriend, Jessie, is murdered by Billy Chambers and Quinn is at the crime scene, Abby is unhappy with Olivia's decision to clean up the crime scene. As a result of Olivia helping Quinn out of jail, Abby assists David Rosen in his investigation of Olivia. This ends when Olivia plants a file containing information regarding a girl who claimed David had beaten her. After learning of this, Abby breaks up with David and apologize to Olivia.

After Olivia left with Jake Ballard, Abby felt betrayed and started working at the White House. When Olivia comes back, Abby refuses to forgive her, which strains their relationship. However, when her ex-husband is nominated for Virginia Senator, Abby and Olivia become friends again after Olivia sabotages Charles's nomination by helping the other candidate. When Olivia is kidnapped, the information of the situation is kept from Abby. She tracks down Stephen with help from Interpol, who rescues Olivia from the kidnappers by buying her on the auction.

=== David Rosen ===
Abby began a relationship with David at the start of the second season when they met at a bar. The relationship began to evolve, with Abby finding out and starts assisting David's investigation of Olivia Pope and how she managed to keep Quinn out of jail. Abby continues to help David as a result of her anger towards Olivia and her decision about keeping Quinn out of jail. She breaks up with him after finding out that a girl filed charges against David for domestic beating. However, she later finds out that the file was false as Olivia and Harrison had planted it in order to break their relationship.

When Olivia and Huck bring recordings from David's apartment to the office, Abby finds out that they were spying on her when she was together with David. She demands the rest of the firm to give her the recordings which contain recordings of her and David in bed. But while listening to the recordings, she hears everything David told her when she was asleep, and when she wasn't there. After hearing this, she confronts Olivia about the file charges David has against him. Olivia confesses that she faked them. Abby still helps Olivia by stealing the Cytron card from David's apartment and lying to him about it.
