= Darby Stanchfield =

American actress (born 1971)

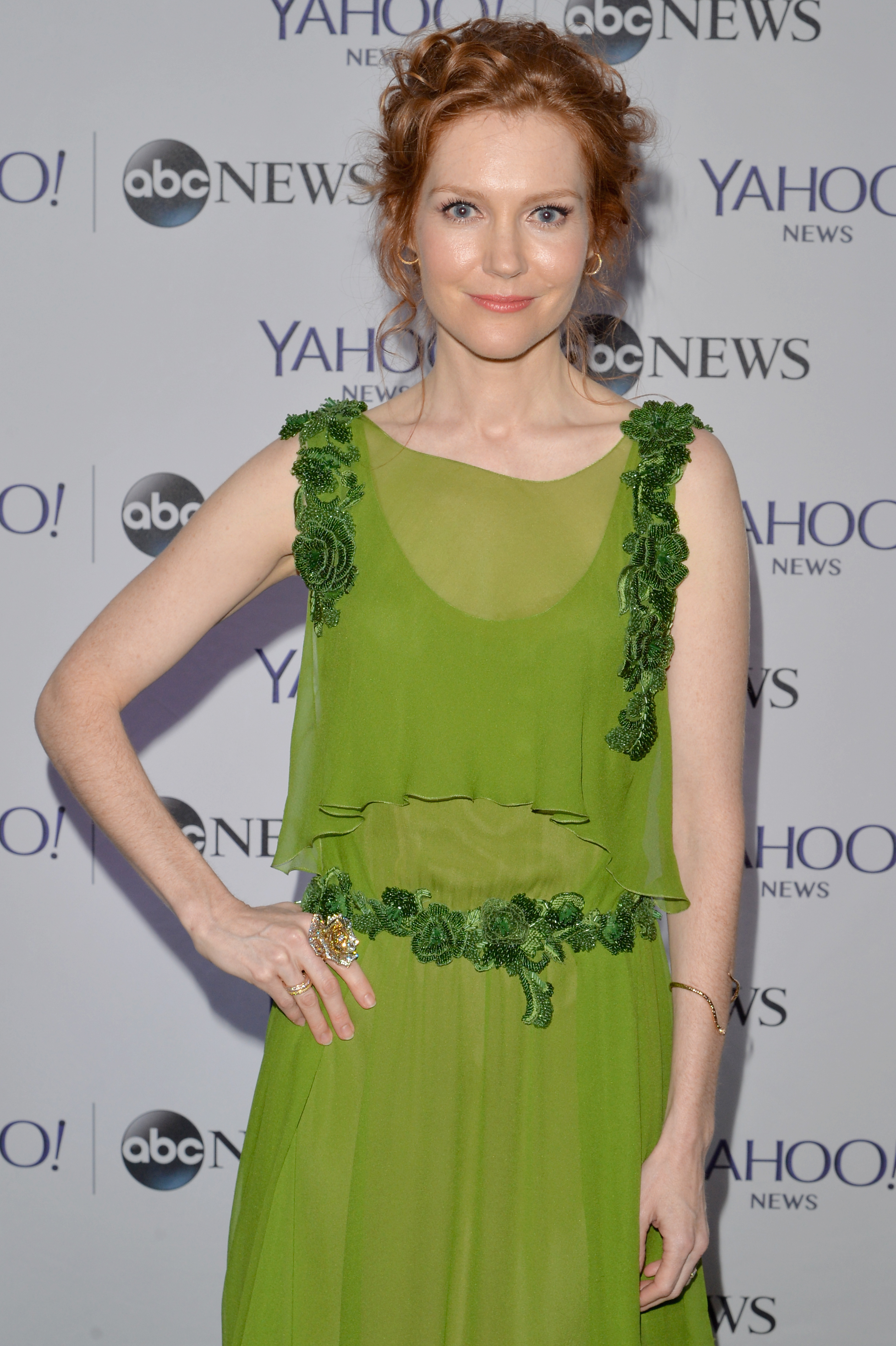
- Stanchfield in Washington, D.C. on May 3, 2014
- Born: Darby Leigh Stanchfield; April 29, 1971 (age 55); Kodiak, Alaska, U.S.
- Education: University of Puget Sound (BA)
- Occupation: Actress
- Years active: 2000–present
- Spouse: Joseph Gallegos (m. 2009)

Darby Leigh Stanchfield (born April 29, 1971) is an American actress. She is best known for her role as Abby Whelan in the ABC political drama series Scandal (2012–2018). Stanchfield is also known for roles as Shannon Gibbs in the CBS military procedural NCIS, April Green in the CBS post-apocalyptic drama series Jericho (2006–07), and as Helen Bishop in the AMC period drama series Mad Men (2007–08). In 2020, she began starring as Nina Locke in the Netflix fantasy horror series Locke & Key.

== Early life ==
Stanchfield was born and raised in Kodiak, Alaska, where her father was a commercial fisherman. She later moved to Dutch Harbor in the Aleutian Islands, and finally Mercer Island, near Seattle. She attended the University of Puget Sound, graduating in 1993 with a degree in Communications and a minor in theater. She graduated from the American Conservatory Theater in San Francisco.

== Career ==
=== 2000–2011 ===
Stanchfield began her career in theater. For a time, she did regional theatre work in the greater Seattle area including acting with the Encore Playhouse in Bellevue, Washington. She made her television debut in an episode of CBS crime drama, Diagnosis: Murder in 2000. She later appeared in a number of television shows, including dramas Angel, Monk, American Dreams, Strong Medicine, Without a Trace, Nip/Tuck, Bones, Cold Case, and The Mentalist, and well as sitcoms That '80s Show, It's All Relative and How I Met Your Mother. In feature films, she had the female lead role opposite Josh Duhamel in the 2004 adaptation of Oscar Wilde's The Picture of Dorian Gray, and co-starred as Nathan Fillion's character wife in the comedy-drama Waitress (2007). She later has appeared in a number of independent films.

From 2006 to 2007, Stanchfield was a regular cast member in the CBS post-apocalyptic drama series Jericho as April Green. In 2007 she played Amelia Joffe (replacing Annie Wersching for two weeks in May) in the ABC daytime soap opera, General Hospital. She later was cast in the recurring role as Helen Bishop on Mad Men, appearing on five episodes. She also played Shannon Gibbs, Mark Harmon's character's first wife, in the CBS procedural NCIS appearing in seven episodes from 2006 to 2015. Stanchfield also guest starred as Meredith, the title character's first ex-wife, on the ABC comedy-drama series Castle in 2009 and in 2013.

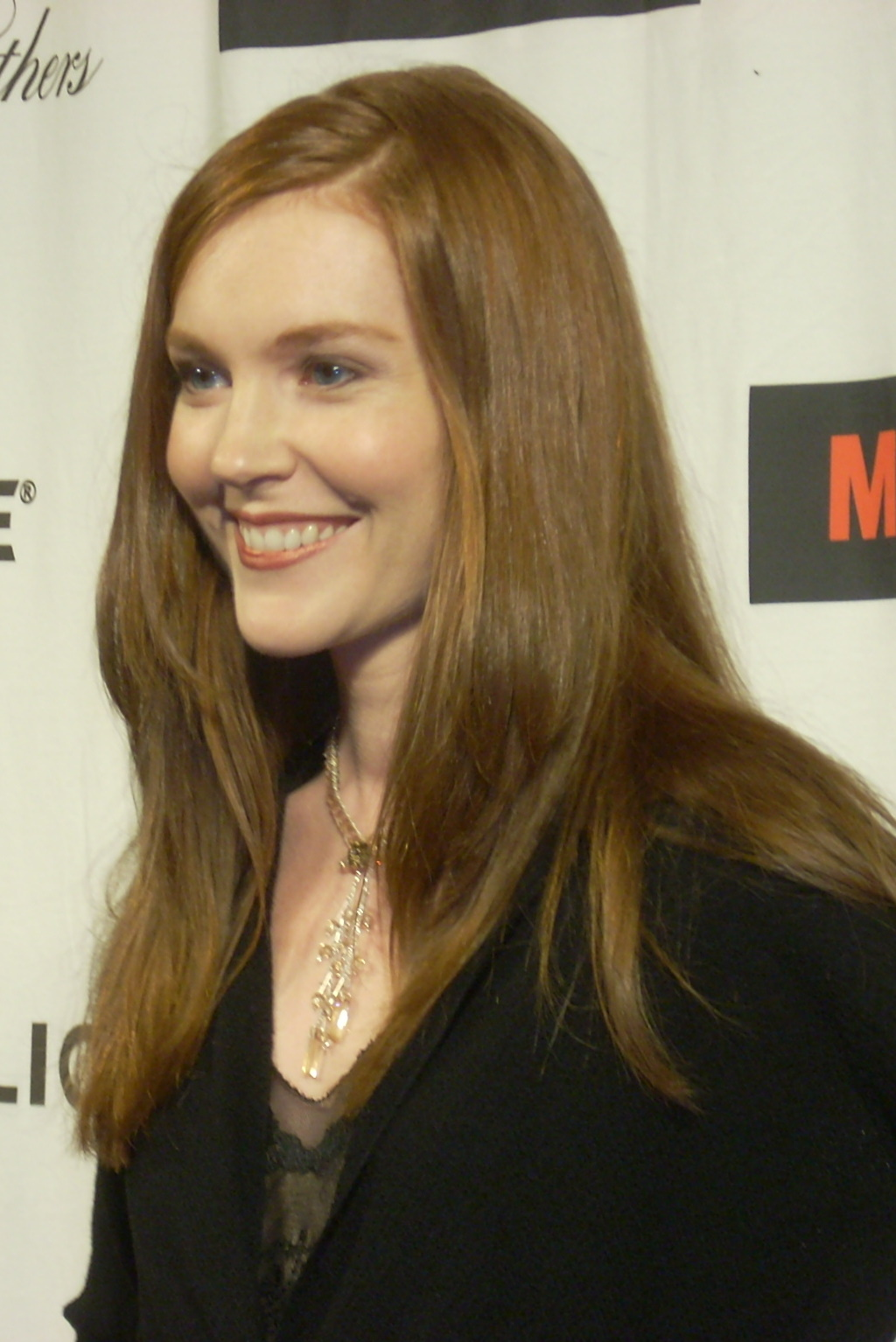
Stanchfield at El Rey Theatre, Los Angeles in October 2008

=== 2012–present ===
In March 2011, Shonda Rhimes cast Stanchfield in her political drama series Scandal. Before Scandal, Stanchfield had guest role on Shonda Rhimes' Private Practice in 2008. The series debuted on ABC on April 5, 2012. She plays the role of Abby Whelan, the investigator in the lead character firm, and later the White House Press Secretary. The series ran for seven seasons and 124 episodes ending in 2018. In 2017, she directed all six episodes of Gladiator Wanted, a web series that debuted prior to the sixth-season premiere and features Guillermo Diaz as Huck, Katie Lowes as Quinn, Cornelius Smith Jr. as Marcus and George Newbern as Charlie. In 2018, she directed one episode of the final season titled "The Noise".

During her Scandal years, Stanchfield co-starred in a number of films. She appeared in the crime horror thriller Carnage Park (2016), that premiered at Sundance Film Festival, and co-starred opposite Raza Jaffrey and Stana Katic in The Rendezvous (2017). She starred alongside Emily Bett Rickards and Meaghan Rath in the mystery-horror The Clinic. In 2018, she was cast as a lead character's mother in the drama Justine. She also played lead character's mother in the 2020 romance drama film Stargirl directed by Julia Hart.

On January 30, 2019, it was announced that Stanchfield had been cast in the series regular role of Nina Locke on the Netflix supernatural drama series Locke & Key. The first season premiered on February 7, 2020 to positive reviews from critics.

== Filmography ==
=== Film ===
Year	Title	Role	Notes
2005	The Picture of Dorian Gray	Sibyl Vane	
2007	Waitress	Francine Pomatter	
2008	The Square Root of 2	Rachel Lehrer	First film with Darby Stanchfield as a lead role
2008	The Sacrifice	Loretta Johnson	Monaco International Film Festival Award for Best Supporting Actress
2009	Open House	Beth Dunne	Short film
2011	Clay	Woman	Short film
2011	Finding Hope	Loretta	
2011	The Guest Room	Karen	
2011	Fixing Pete	Cynthia	
2015	Loserville	Evelyn MacDonald	
2016	Carnage Park	Ellen San Diego	
2016	The Rendezvous	Ruthie	
2018	The Clinic	Emily	
2019	Justine	Alison Green	
2020	Stargirl	Gloria Borlock	
2020	Mosquito	Clementine Bell	
2023	Willie and Me	Rebecca	

=== Television ===
Year	Title	Role	Notes
2000	Diagnosis: Murder	Nora	Episode: "Hot House"
2001	Angel	Denise	Episode: "Happy Anniversary"
2002	That '80s Show	Spokesmodel #1	Episode: "Road Trip"
2002	American Dreams	Amy	Episode: "The Fighting Irish"
2003	Monk	Erin Hammond	Episode: "Mr. Monk Goes to the Ballgame"
2004	It's All Relative	Jordan F.	Episode: "Who's Camping Now"
2004	Good Girls Don't...	Redhead	Episode: "Whatever Happened to Jane's Baby?"
2004	Strong Medicine	Hilary Davis	Episode: "Code"
2004	Single Santa Seeks Mrs. Claus	Store Clerk	Television film
2005	Without a Trace	Kim	Episode: "End Game"
2005	24	Shari	Episode: "Day 4: 5:00 a.m.-6:00 a.m."
2005	The Inside	New Girl	Episode: "New Girl in Town"
2005	Nip/Tuck	Aimee Bolton	Episode: "Tommy Bolton"
2006	Campus Ladies	Mikka	Episode: "Night of the Condom"
2006–2007	Jericho	April Green	15 episodes
2006–2015	NCIS	Shannon Gibbs	7 episodes
2007	Bones	Connie Lopata	Episode: "The Bodies in the Book"
2007	General Hospital	Amelia Joffe	10 episodes
2007	Cold Case	Melissa Carter	Episode: "Thick as Thieves"
2007	Exes and Ohs	Sienna	3 episodes
2007–2008	Mad Men	Helen Bishop	5 episodes
2008	Private Practice	Tess Milford	Episode: "Tempting Faith"
2009	Exes & Ohs	Sienna	Episode: "Fish in a Barrel"
2009	The Mentalist	Stevie Caid	Episode: "Paint It Red"
2009	Ghost Whisperer	Greer Clarkson	Episode: "Delusions of Grandview"
2009	Life	Ella Holden	Episode: "Initiative 38"
2009	CSI: NY	Dawn Higgins	Episode: "It Happened to Me"
2009, 2013	Castle	Meredith	Episodes: "Always Buy Retail" and "Significant Others"
2010	How I Met Your Mother	Marissa Heller	Episode: "Robots Versus Wrestlers"
2011	CSI: Miami	Linda Hill	Episode: "F-T-F"
2011	Burn Notice	Sadie Forte	Episode: "Eye for an Eye"
2012–2018	Scandal	Abby Whelan	Series regular, 120 episodes TV Guide Award for Fan Favorite Cast in a Drama Series (2013)
2020–2022	Locke & Key	Nina Locke	Main role; 28 episodes

=== Web ===
Year	Title	Role	Notes
2017	Gladiator Wanted	N/A	Director, 6 episodes
