= Over a Cliff =

- Scandal episode
- Episode no.: Season 7 Episode 18
- Directed by: Tom Verica
- Written by: Shonda Rhimes
- Cinematography by: Oliver Bokelberg
- Editing by: Christal A. Khatib
- Production code: 718
- Original air date: April 19, 2018
- Running time: 45 minutes

Guest appearances
- Michael O'Neill as Lonnie Mencken; Gregg Henry as Hollis Doyle; Tom Amandes as Samuel Reston; Brian Letscher as Tom Larsen; Jay Jackson as Mike Waters; Kate Burton as Sally Langston

Episode chronology
| ← Previous "Standing in the Sun" | Next → — |

"Over a Cliff" is the series finale of the American political drama television series Scandal. It premiered in the United States on April 19, 2018 on ABC. The eighteenth episode of the seventh season and the 124th episode overall, it was directed by Tom Verica and written by showrunner Shonda Rhimes. According to Nielsen Media Research, it was watched by 5.46 million Americans, acquiring a 1.3/5 rating/share in the 18–49 age range demographic.

Kerry Washington stars as female lead Olivia Pope, who convinces her colleagues to confess every crime they committed, including the existence of the top secret organization B613. Quinn Perkins (Katie Lowes) is helped by her friends to make an improvised marriage with Charlie (George Newbern), while various other story lines begin to settle down.

== Plot ==
Due to the recent reveal of B613's existence, Olivia meets with Lonnie Mencken, who says he will make sure they get a proper Senate hearing if Mellie makes gun control her first priority. After Olivia agrees, he shoots himself to ensure the hearing takes place, leaving David in charge. At the senate hearing Olivia admits to ordering Rashad's assassination, Mellie and Fitz admit they knew of B613, Tom confesses to killing Frankie Vargas under Cyrus' orders, and Hollis admits to being a part of election fraud. Everyone starts to deal with their impending imprisonment while helping get Quinn to Charlie so they can get married. After failing to kill David, Jake tells Cyrus he is not going to take his orders anymore. On his quest to have Mellie impeached, Cyrus poisons David and smothers him. The ruling is postponed due to a new witness coming forward: Rowan; he admits to being Command. Jake is imprisoned for his actions in B613. An alcoholic Cyrus resigns as vice president. Mellie approves of the bill on gun control to law. Olivia and Fitz reunite. Two young girls visit the National Portrait Gallery where there is a portrait of Olivia.

=== Starring ===
- Kerry Washington as Olivia Pope
- Scott Foley as Jacob "Jake" Ballard
- Darby Stanchfield as Abigail "Abby" Whelan
- Katie Lowes as Quinn Perkins
- Guillermo Diaz as Diego "Huck" Muñoz
- Jeff Perry as Vice President Cyrus Beene
- Joshua Malina as Attorney-General David Rosen
- Bellamy Young as President Melody Margaret "Mellie" Grant
- Joe Morton as Elijah "Eli"/"Rowan" Pope
- George Newbern as Charlie
- Cornelius Smith Jr. as Marcus Walker
- Tony Goldwyn as President Fitzgerald "Fitz" Thomas Grant III

=== Guest starring ===
- Michael O'Neill as Lonnie Mencken
- Gregg Henry as Hollis Doyle
- Tom Amandes as Samuel Reston
- Brian Letscher as Tom Larsen
- Jay Jackson as Mike Waters
- Kate Burton as Sally Langston

== Reception ==
=== Ratings ===
In the United States, the episode received a 1.3/5 percent share among adults between the ages of 18 and 49, meaning that it was seen by 1.3 percent of all households, and 5 percent of all of those watching television at the time of the broadcast. It was watched by 5.46 million Americans.

=== Reviews ===
Joshua Alston of Vulture gave the episode a 4 out of 5 stars rating, stating that it is "pretty darn successful, moving briskly and offering a satisfying mix of resolutions, comeuppances, surprises, and pure fan service." USA Today's Anika Reed praised the series in its entirety, not just the final episode, commenting the show "put a black woman as the lead of a primetime drama for the first time since 1974, with [Kerry] Washington as D.C. fixer Olivia Pope. The show arguably changed the makeup of the television landscape and created a space for shows with complicated black lead actors." Brian Lowry, writing a positive review for CNN, stated that the episode "felt both ridiculous and wholly appropriate. Admittedly, this appraisal doesn't come from a 'gladiator,' an allusion to the show's die-hard loyalists, but rather somebody who thought it was bad in the early going, and tolerable once it adapted and embraced the crazy." He also commented on the series as a whole, affirming that Scandal "was less about politics (a lot of those flourishes were exaggerated to the point of not making much sense) than the corrupting influence of power, using Washington's corridors as the glamorous backdrop for a primetime soap, mixing its steamy relationships with wild deep-state conspiracies."
