= Watch Me (Scandal) =

- Scandal episode
- A scene during which Jake, Mellie and Olivia discuss the vanishing of Joshua Stewart.
- Episode no.: Season 7 Episode 1
- Directed by: Jann Turner
- Written by: Shonda Rhimes
- Cinematography by: Daryn Okada
- Editing by: Kyle Bond
- Original air date: October 5, 2017
- Running time: 43:03

Guest appearances
- Jay Hernandez as Curtis Pryce; Shaun Toub as Ambassador Marashi; Bess Armstrong as Senator Diane Greenwald; David Bickford as Senator Michaels; Tina Huang as Madeline Stewart; Andrew Tinpo Lee as Joshua Stewart

Episode chronology
← Previous "Transfer of Power"	Next → "Pressing the Flesh"
- Scandal (season 7)

"Watch Me" is the first episode of the seventh season of the American political thriller television series Scandal, and the 107th episode overall. Written by series creator and showrunner Shonda Rhimes and directed by Jann Turner, it premiered on the American Broadcasting Company (ABC) on October 5, 2017. This episode was watched by 5.52 million viewers.

== Plot ==
Local news announce Luna Vargas' death, which was considered a heart attack; Cyrus Beene's (Jeff Perry) new position as Vice President; and President Mellie Grant's (Bellamy Young) first joint session at the Congress, during which she promised a bill to free education. Senator Michaels (David Bickford) is interviewed by Curtis Pryce (Jay Hernandez) and tells him he does not stand for the bill. However, Olivia Pope (Kerry Washington), President Grant's Chief of Staff, blackmails Senator Michaels with an envelope containing a lot of prejudicial info on him in exchange of his positive response during the bill vote. Shortly after, Pope enters the Oval Office to tell Grant and Beene about Michaels' "help," and convinces Beene to talk with other senators. Olivia is interviewed by Pryce about the bill, and the two end up arguing about meritocracy and racism.

Meanwhile, at the office of Quinn Perkins & Associates, Abby Whelan (Darby Stanchfield), Charlie (George Newbern) and Quinn Perkins (Katie Lowes) try to rip out of David Rosen (Joshua Malina) someone he knows who is in crisis so that QPA could work. A woman desperately enters the office looking for help and Quinn and Abby rushes to talk with her. The woman, named Madeline Stewart (Tina Huang), tells her father travelled overseas and, during the previous two nights, he wasn't calling her, which triggered suspicious. At night, Olivia and Jake Ballard (Scott Foley) discuss about their uncommitted affair. The next morning, Ballard investigates Joshua Stewart (Andrew Tinpo Lee), Madeline's missing father, and discovers he is a CIA agent who helps the Nation several times as an undercover, so his vanishing is something to worry about. Jake suggests they kill him in order to prevent any type of betray since he could've been caught by terrorist and such.

Cyrus meets with Senator Diane Greenwald (Bess Armstrong) to talk about the Vargas bill, and she reveals that she opposes to the bill because it should be a Democratic rather than a Republican product, as well as prompting Cyrus to look forward to a future where he is President, and not Pope and Grant's doormat. Quinn omits to Madeline the fact that her father is a spy, and Huck (Guillermo Díaz) thinks ahead and visits Olivia, already knowing that she and Jake planned Joshua's death, and states that his daughter will need a body to bury. However, the next morning, President Grant summits Jake in the Oval to ask him about Joshua's rescue, which was planned by Olivia, much to Jake's dismay. President Grant has a reunion with Ambassador Marachi (Shaun Toub) in which she regards American assets being kept in Bashman.

== Production ==
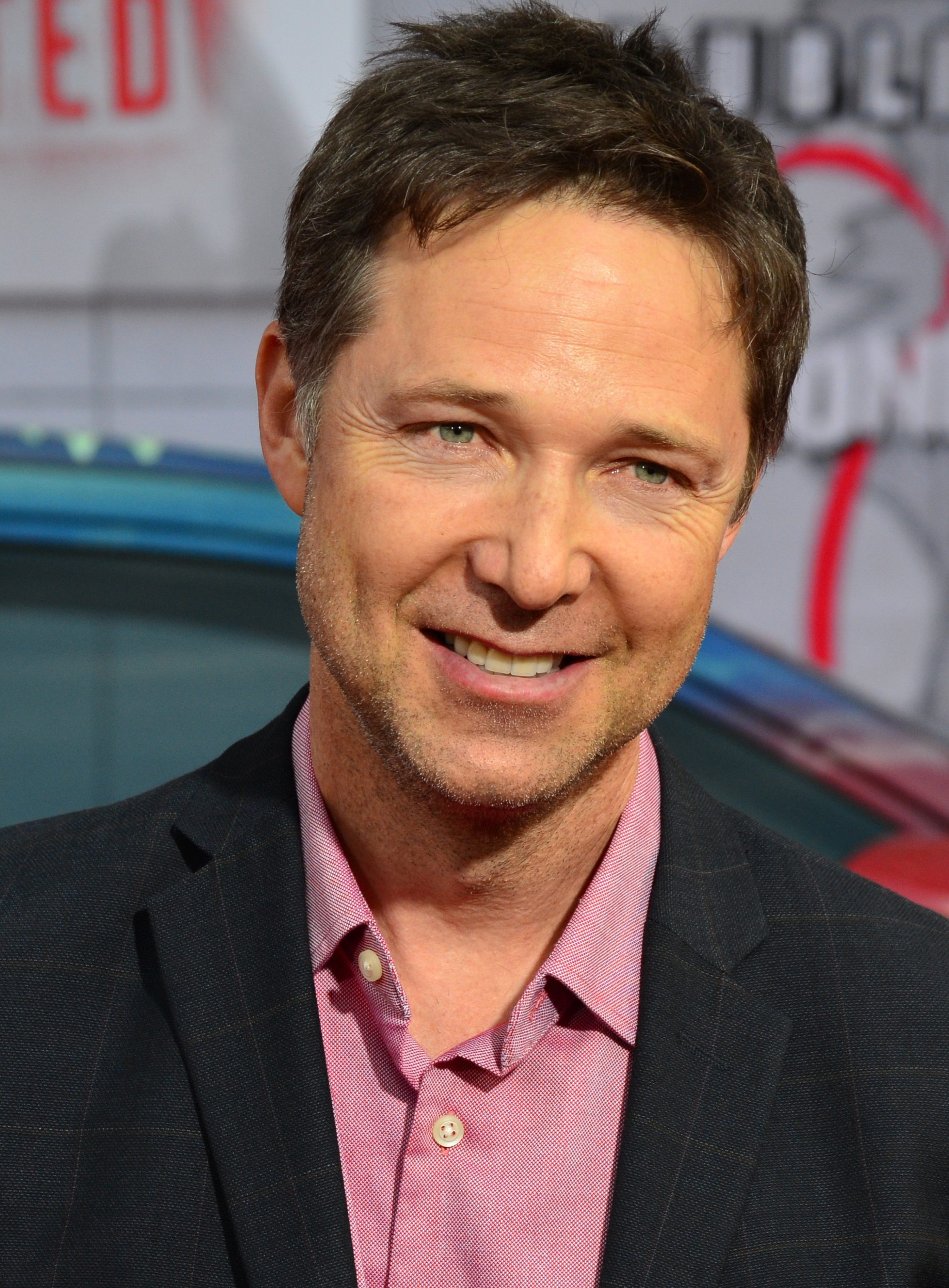
George Newbern was upgraded to the regular cast.

This episode was directed by Jann Turner and written by Scandal creator and showrunner Shonda Rhimes. ABC renewed the series for a seventh and final season on February 10, 2017. The season began airing on October 5, 2017, with this episode, and will consist of 18 episodes, adding the total episode count of the show to 124 episodes. Cast member George Newbern was upgraded to a series regular after being a recurring cast member for the past six seasons and made his first appearance as a regular actor in this episode, portraying former B613 assassin Charlie. The table read for the episode started on July 19, 2017. Filming commenced on August 2, 2017, and wrapped on the following day. A promo containing scenes from Scandal and other ShondaLand productions, which also featured Taylor Swift's song "Look What You Made Me Do", was released on September 11, 2017. This episode features the songs "Fight the Power" by American hip hop group Public Enemy and "It Takes Two" by Rob Base & DJ E-Z Rock. Score for this episode was developed by Chad Fischer.

== Reception ==
=== Ratings ===
"Watch Me" premiered on ABC on October 5, 2017. During its airing, the installment was watched by 5.52 million Americans, acquiring a 1.4/5 Nielsen rating/share on the 18–49 demographic. These values had an increase in front of the previous episode and a decrease regarding the sixth-season premiere, earlier 2017. This episode is rated TV-14.

=== Reviews ===
Reviewers overall commented on the fact that this episode is the last season premiere. Kendall Williams of Den of Geek gave the premiere a 3.5 out of 5 stars rating, labelling it as "predictable." Billy Nilles of E! News praised the episode, commenting, "As the season opener proved, [Olivia is] exactly where she's always wanted to be—though perhaps not exactly with who she wanted to be with." Ashley Ray-Harris of The A.V. Club lauded the episode, giving it a A letter rating and saying it was "one of the show’s best premieres and it sets the stage for an intriguing season with our favorite characters." Justin Kirkland of EW.com repeatedly mourned over the show's ending and praised the premiere. Andrea Reiher of Refinery29 gave the episode a mixed review but praised Kerry Washingston's performance as Olivia Pope and the show's new directions. Joshua Alston of Vulture had a positive response, giving the episode a 4 out of 5 stars rating. Paul Dailly of TVFanatic has a mixed opinion, giving the installment a 3.8 out of 5 stars rating, saying it was "decent," adding, "It had the characters in some crazy situations, but as far as premieres go, this was the quietest one in quite some time."
