= List of Scandal characters =

Scandal is an American political thriller series created by Shonda Rhimes for ABC. The show features an ensemble cast of regular characters, with 8 main characters in its first season. Since the first season, two characters have left the show or have been written out, and several new main characters have been written in or upgraded in the series. Following is a list of characters who have appeared over the various seasons since the show's premiere.

== Main characters ==
Actor	Character	First Appearance	Seasons						
Actor	Character	First Appearance	1	2	3	4	5	6	7
Kerry Washington	Olivia Pope	"Sweet Baby" (1.01)	Main	Main	Main	Main	Main	Main	Main
Darby Stanchfield	Abby Whelan	"Sweet Baby" (1.01)	Main	Main	Main	Main	Main	Main	Main
Katie Lowes	Quinn Perkins	"Sweet Baby" (1.01)	Main	Main	Main	Main	Main	Main	Main
Guillermo Diaz	Diego "Huck" Muñoz	"Sweet Baby" (1.01)	Main	Main	Main	Main	Main	Main	Main
Jeff Perry	Cyrus Beene	"Sweet Baby" (1.01)	Main	Main	Main	Main	Main	Main	Main
Tony Goldwyn	Fitz Thomas Grant III	"Sweet Baby" (1.01)	Main	Main	Main	Main	Main	Main	Main
Columbus Short	Harrison Wright	"Sweet Baby" (1.01)	Main	Main	Main				
Henry Ian Cusick	Stephen Finch	"Sweet Baby" (1.01)	Main			Guest			
Joshua Malina	David Rosen	"Sweet Baby" (1.01)	Recurring	Main	Main	Main	Main	Main	Main
Bellamy Young	Mellie Grant	"Sweet Baby" (1.01)	Recurring	Main	Main	Main	Main	Main	Main
Scott Foley	Jake Ballard	"Whiskey Tango Foxtrot" (2.14)		Recurring	Main	Main	Main	Main	Main
Portia de Rossi	Elizabeth North	"Randy, Red, Superfreak and Julia" (4.01)				Recurring	Main (Note: Portia de Rossi is credited as a series regular from 5x01 through 6x11.)	Main	
Cornelius Smith Jr.	Marcus Walker	"The Lawn Chair" (4.14)				Recurring	Main	Main	Main
Joe Morton	Eli Pope	"Snake in the Garden" (2.17)		Recurring	Recurring	Recurring	Main (Note: Joe Morton is credited as a series regular in 5x12 and from 5x16 onward. In other episodes of season 5, he is credited as a recurring cast member.)	Main	Main
George Newbern	Charlie	"Crash and Burn" (1.05)	Recurring	Recurring	Recurring	Recurring	Recurring	Recurring	Main

Cast notes

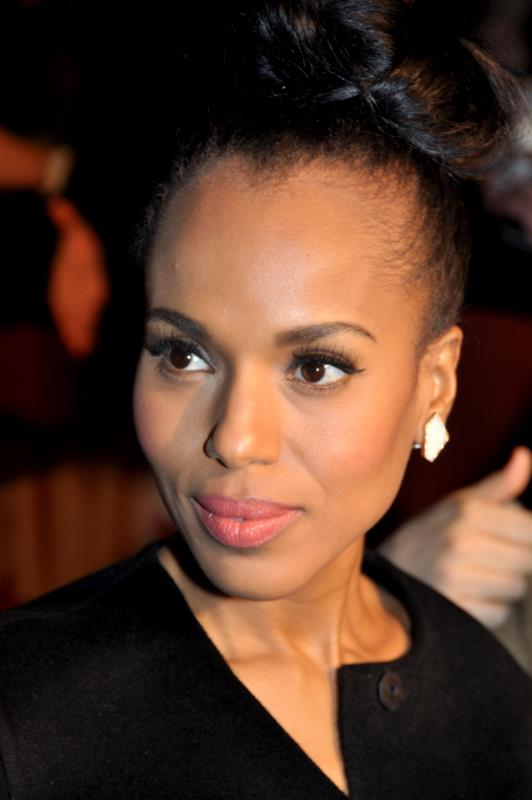
Kerry Washington (Olivia Pope)

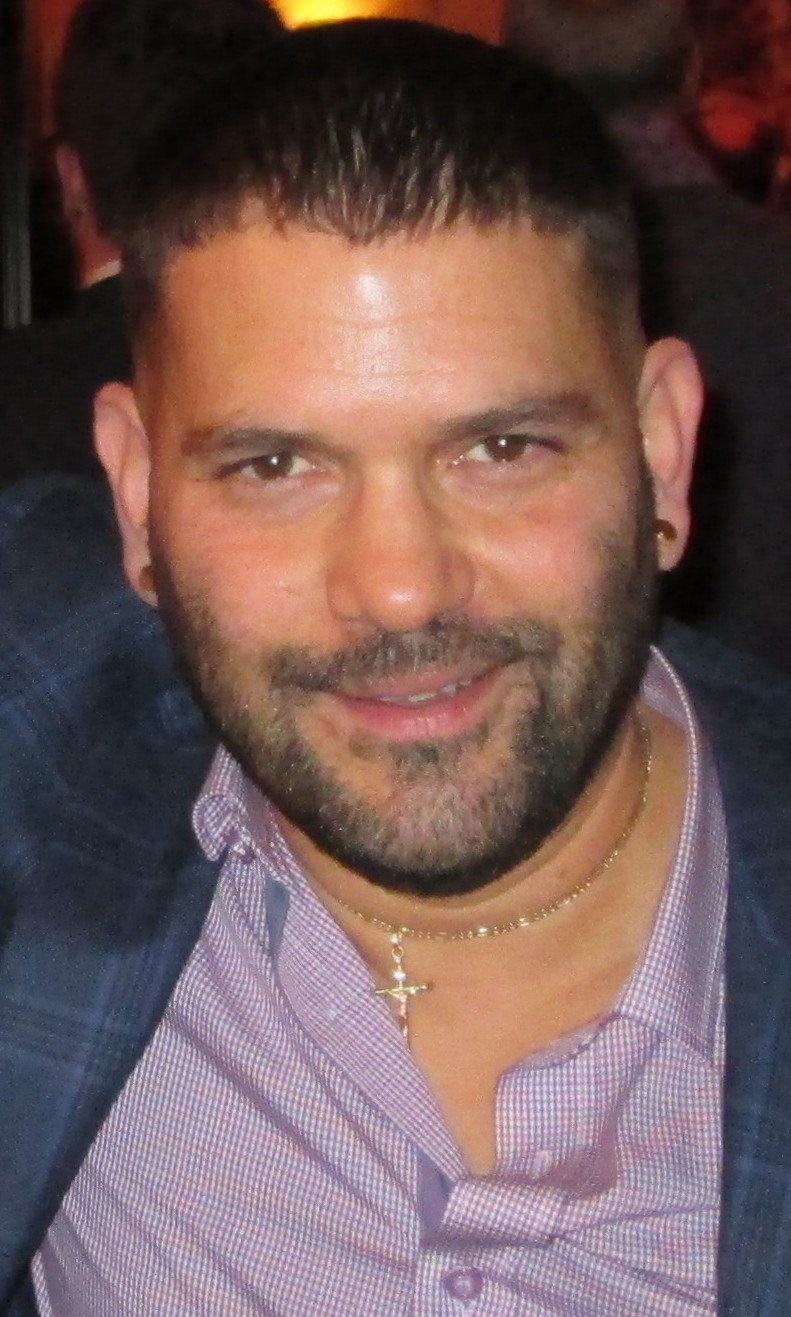
Guillermo Díaz (Huck Finn)

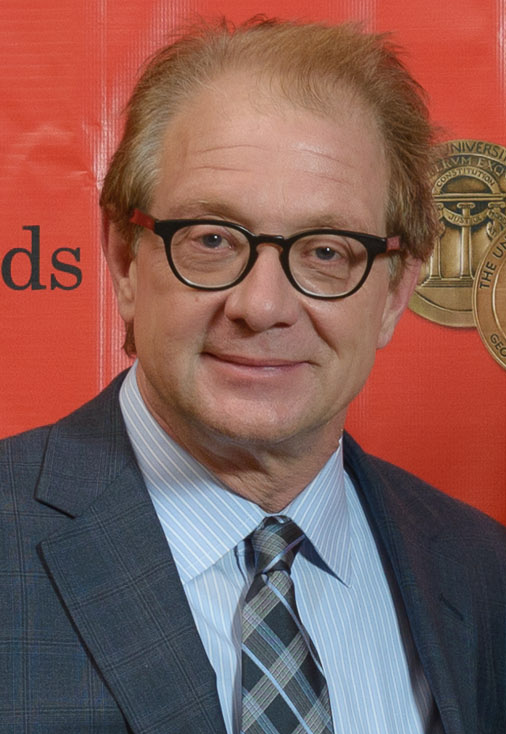
Jeff Perry (Cyrus Beene)

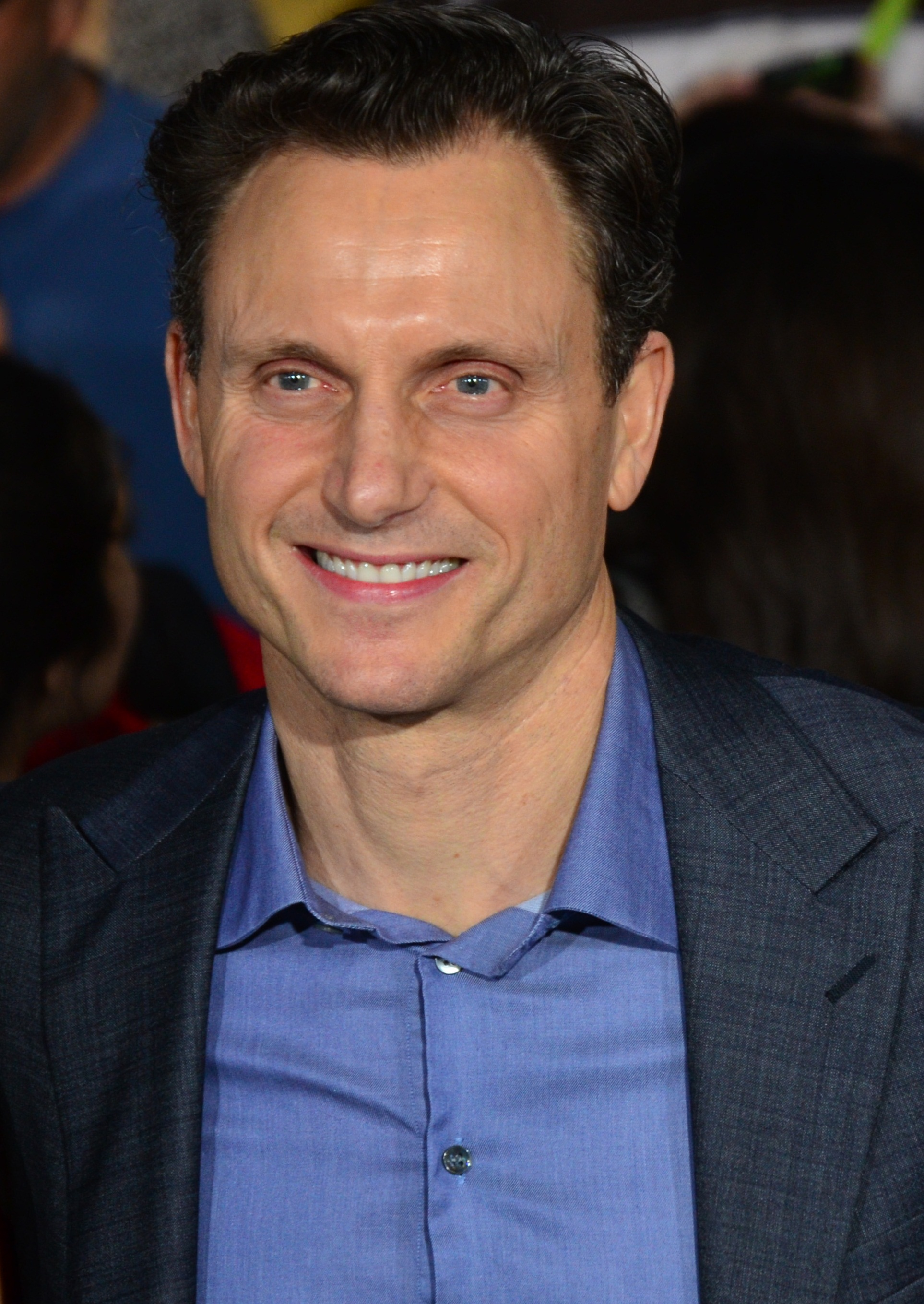
Tony Goldwyn (Fitzgerald Grant)

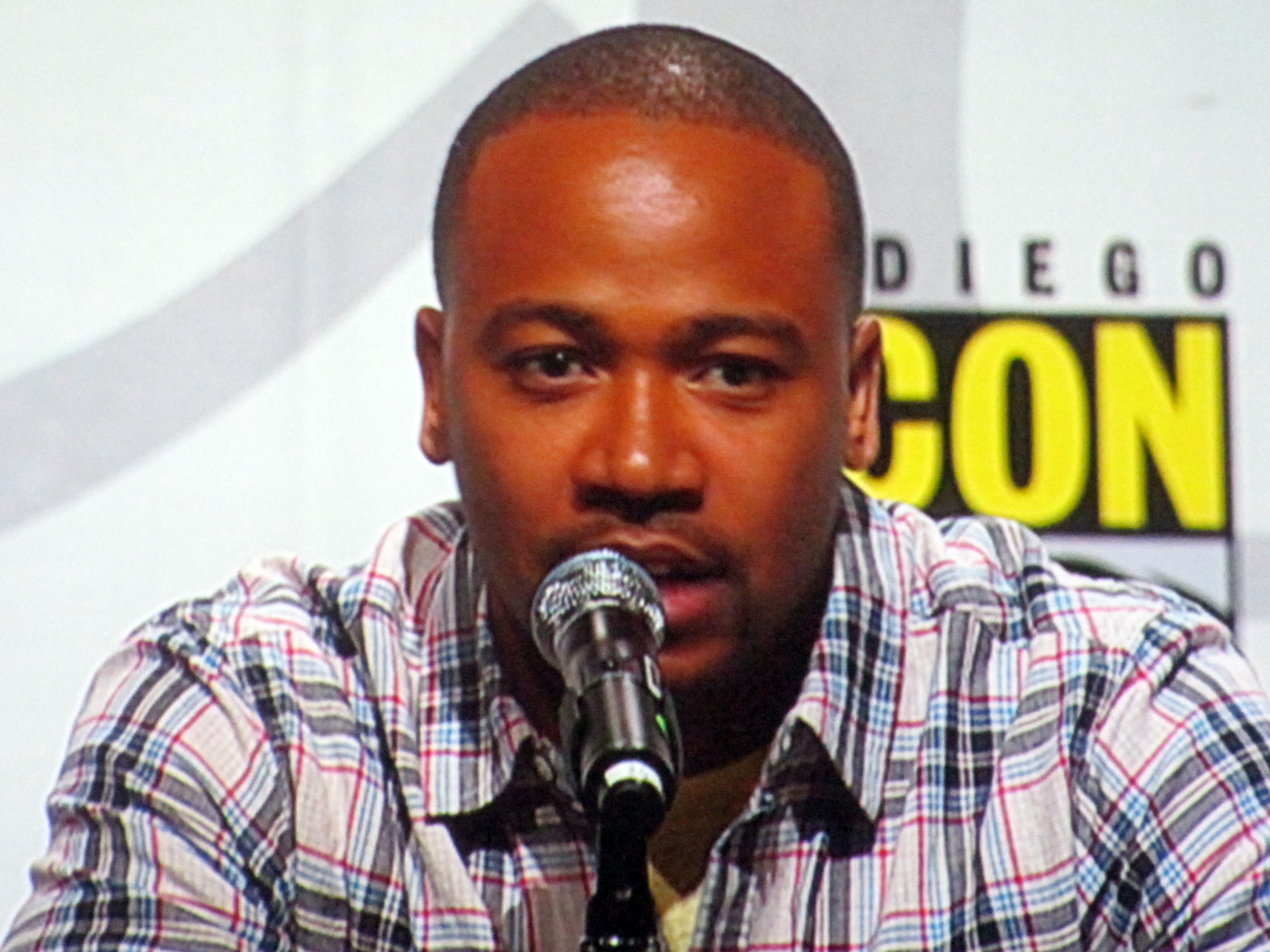
Columbus Short (Harrison Wright)

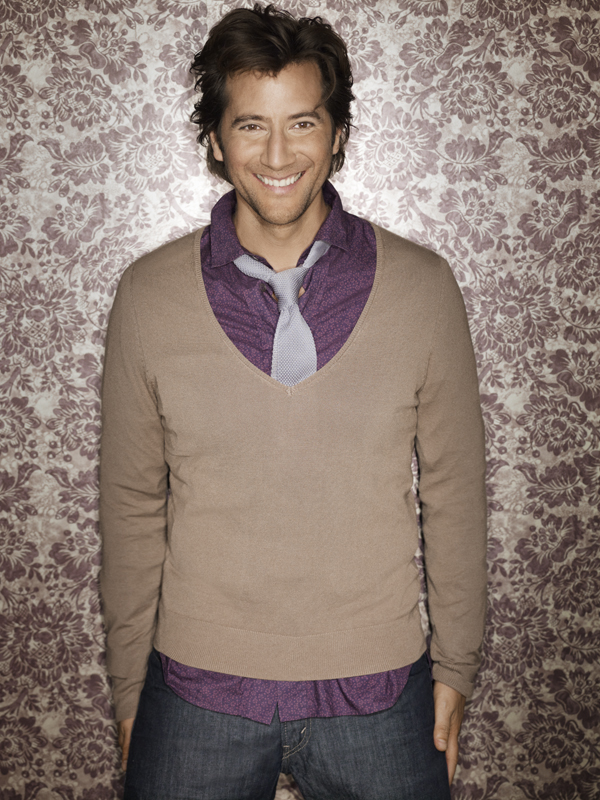
Henry Ian Cusick (Stephen Finch)

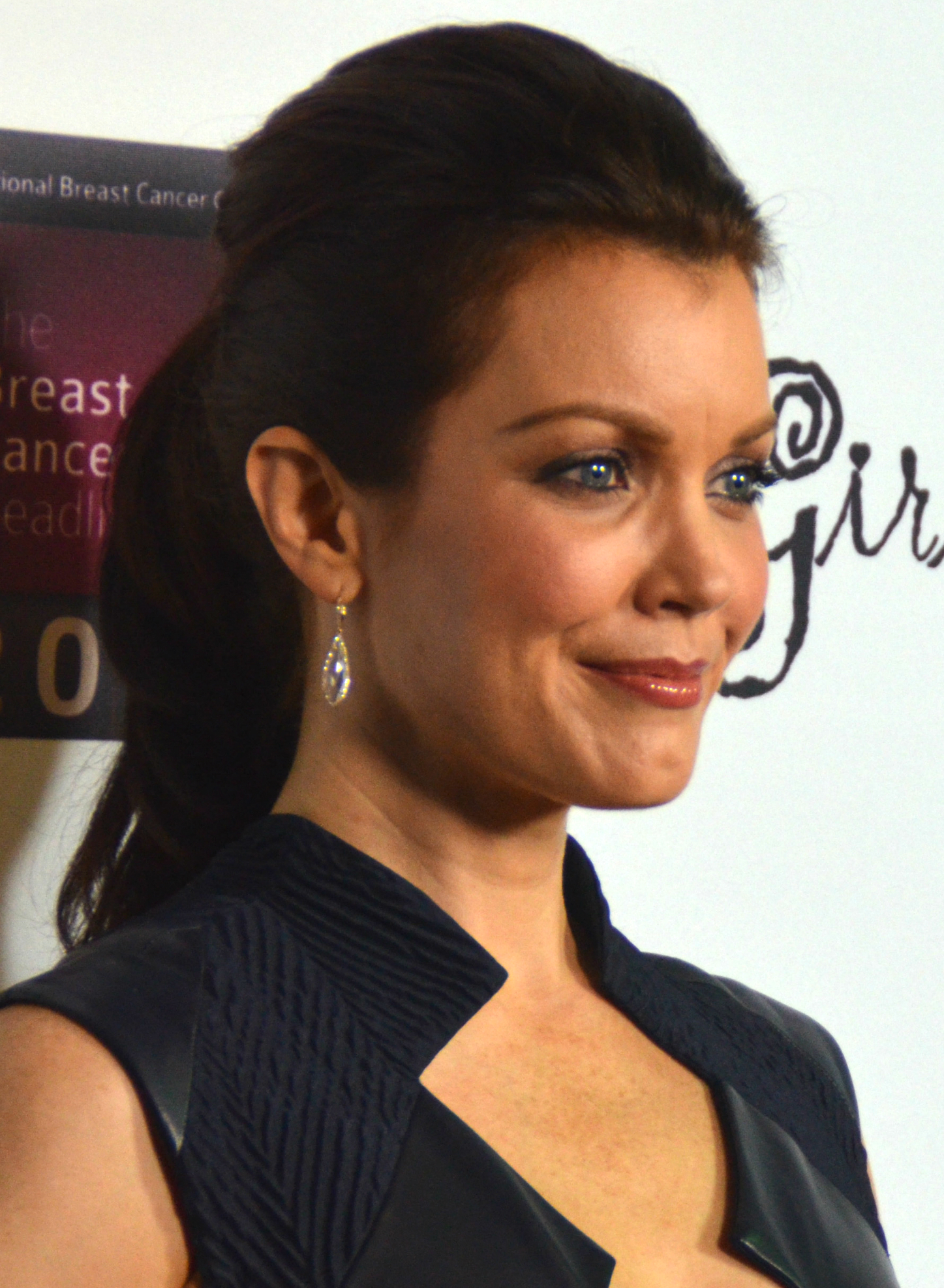
Bellamy Young (Mellie Grant)

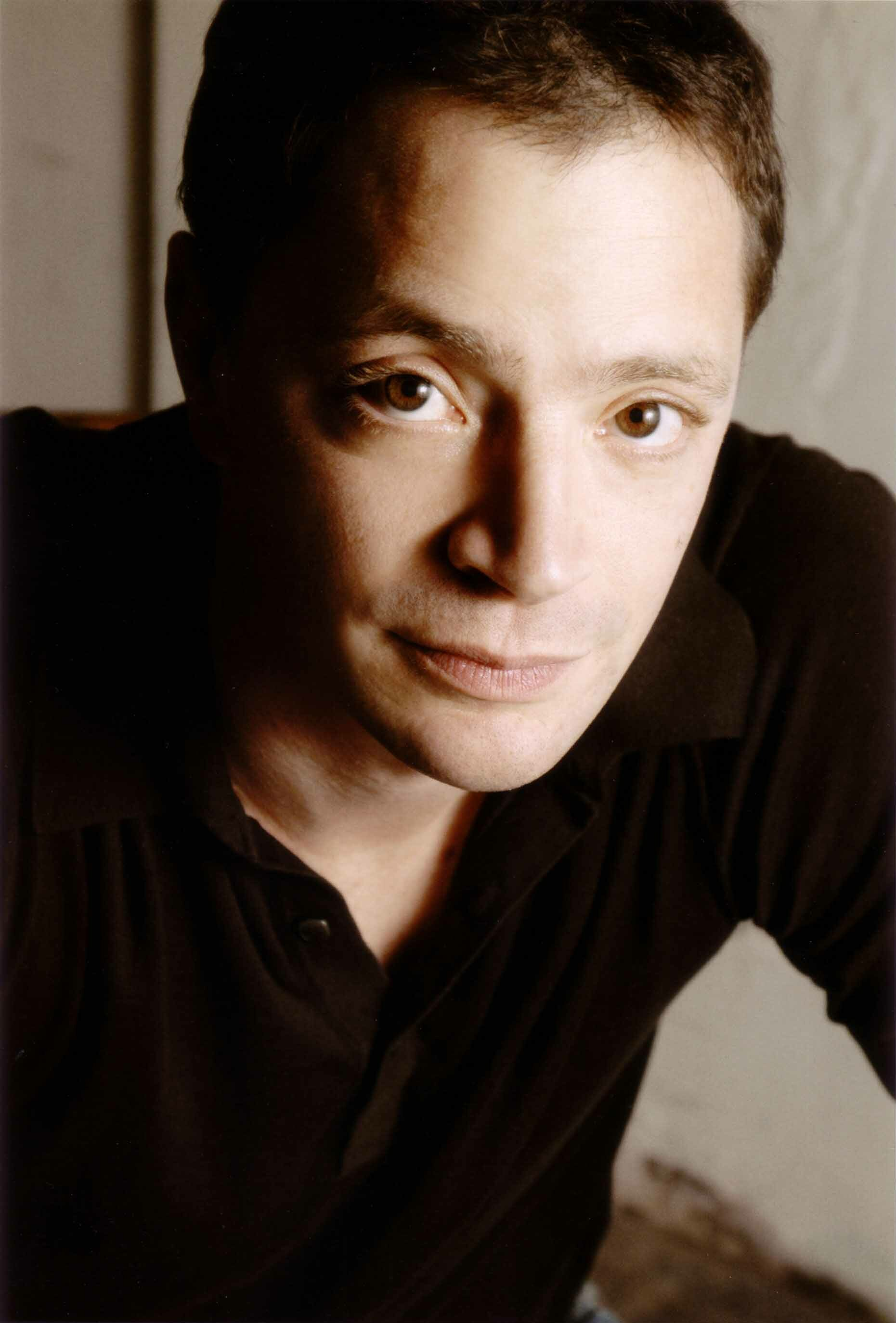
Joshua Malina (David Rosen)

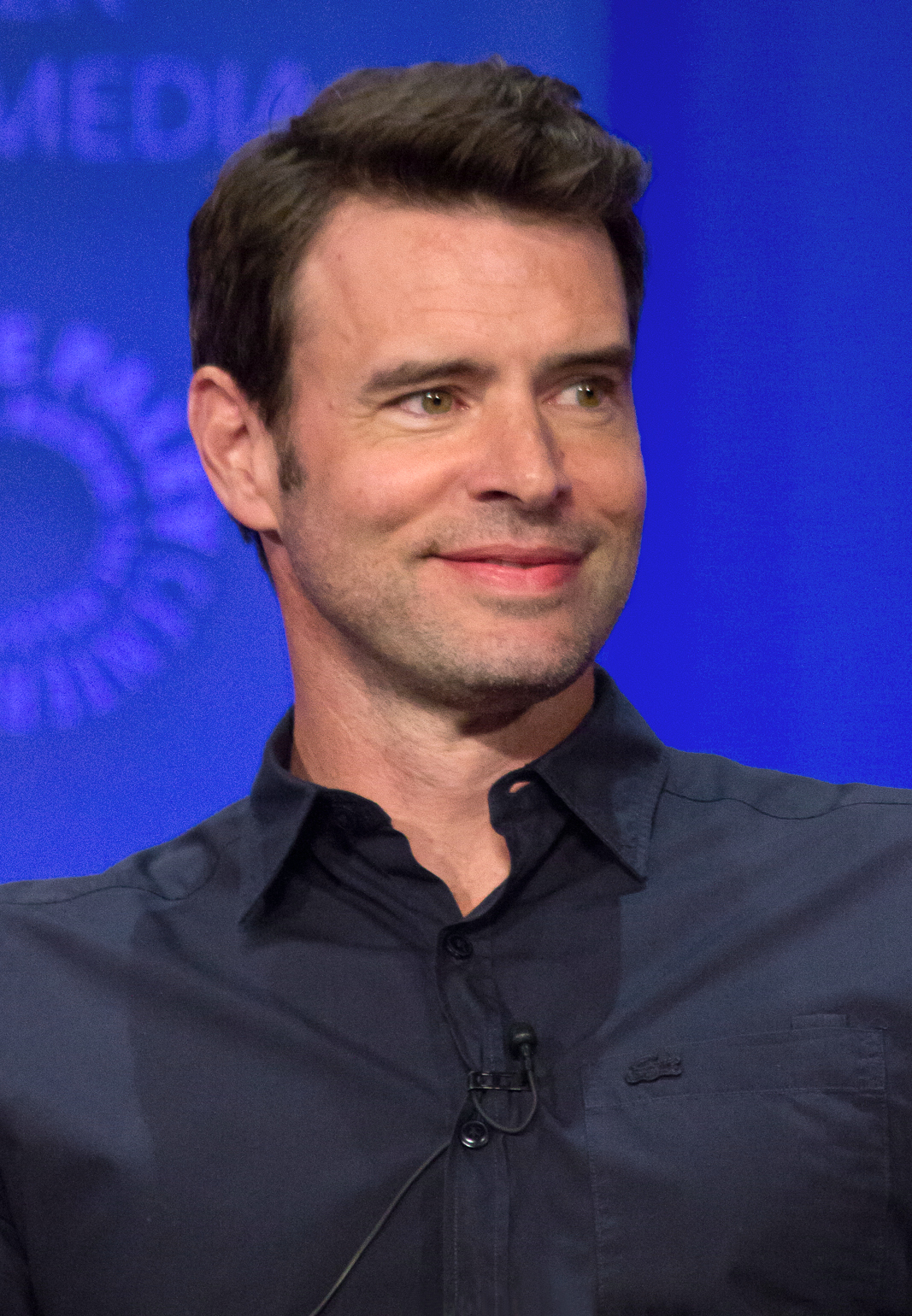
Scott Foley (Jake Ballard)

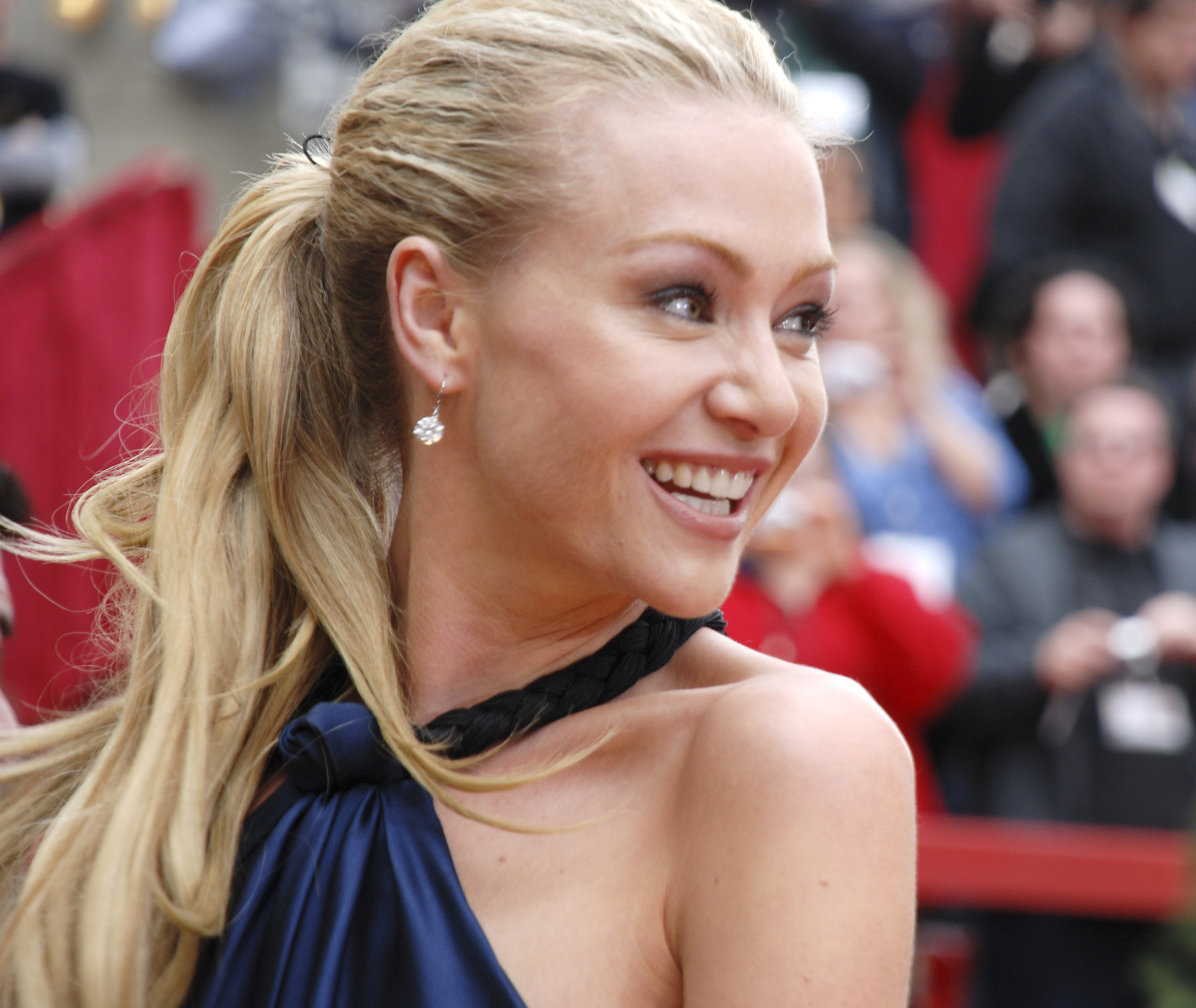
Portia de Rossi (Elizabeth North)

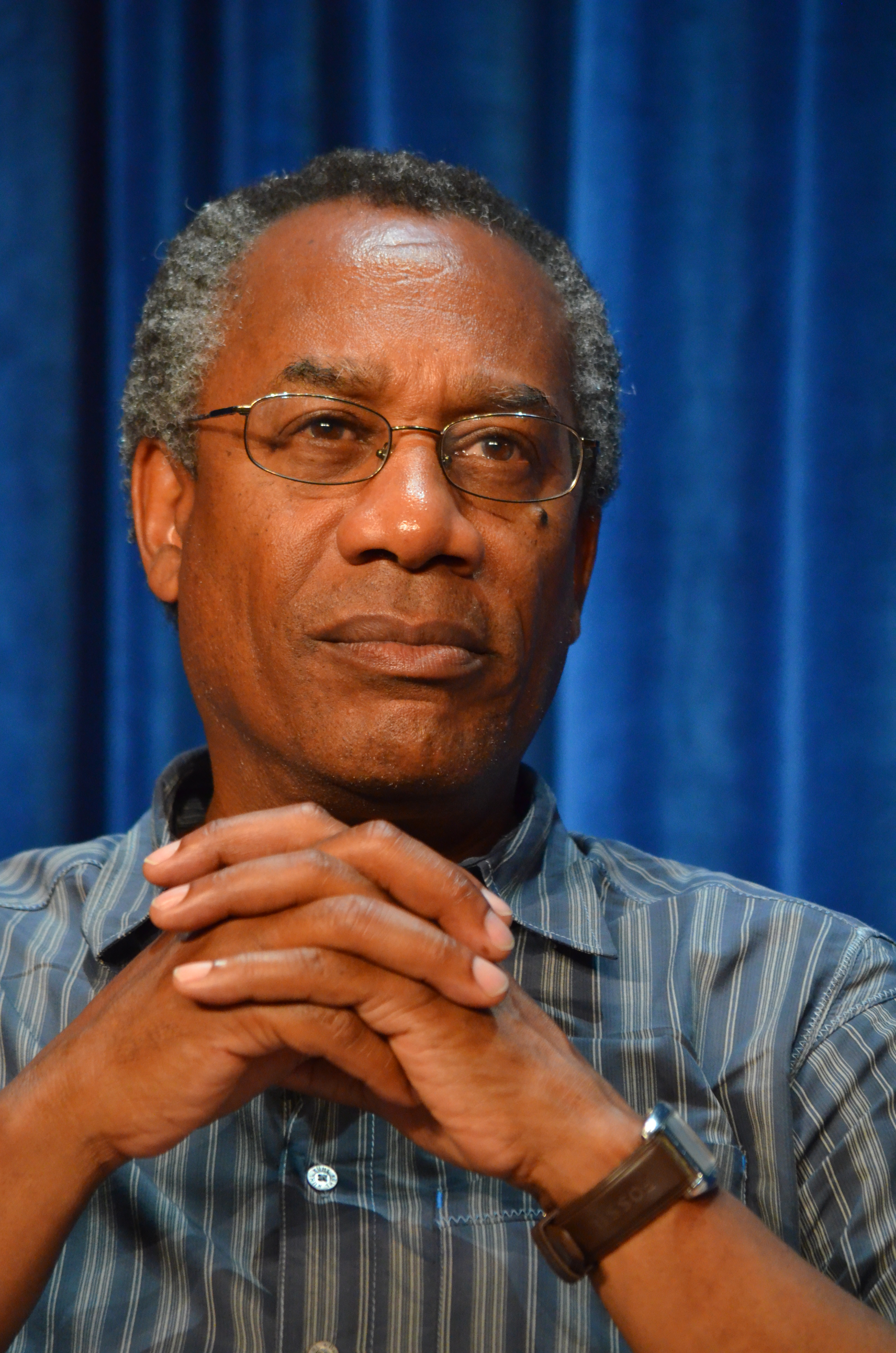
Joe Morton (Eli Pope)

=== Olivia Pope ===
Olivia Carolyn Pope, portrayed by Kerry Washington, is a former White House Communications Director who is widely regarded as the best "fixer" in Washington. Olivia worked on the presidential campaign of then-Governor Fitzgerald Thomas Grant III, with whom she began an affair. After Fitz became president and named Olivia Director of Communications, they continued the affair. Although she still had feelings for him, Olivia knew that it would be best to resign from her position, and as a result, she started "Pope & Associates", a crisis management company. Throughout season one, Olivia demonstrates that she is very dedicated to her work and to the people she helps, and that she's surrounded by staff who are very loyal to her because she saved each of them from a problem in their past. At the beginning of season two, it is revealed that Olivia had something to do with Quinn Perkins's past and that she made a call that eventually got Quinn's case thrown out of court, saving her from the death penalty. Olivia is shown to have a contentious relationship with Mellie, the First Lady; the two women cannot stand each other but tolerate each other for the sake of the presidency. Olivia's father, Eli Pope, was the leader of a secret government organization titled B613. At the beginning of season five, it is leaked to the public that Mellie was thrown out of the White House and Olivia is, in fact, Fitz's mistress. She eventually makes a deal with her father and Mellie to keep the Senate from impeaching Fitz. However, she leaves Fitz by the end of the fall finale and moves on. She's currently running Mellie's bid for president. At the end of season 7, she and Fitz come back together.

=== Stephen Finch ===
Stephen Finch, portrayed by Henry Ian Cusick, is a litigator who worked with Olivia and is one of her good friends. He is Scottish-born and became a U.S. citizen in 1995 shortly after graduating first in his class from Yale Law School. He was a top litigator for a firm called Chase and Howard but suffered a nervous breakdown in the middle of defending a client in a class action lawsuit against Bromquest, a chemical manufacturer that poisoned children in West Virginia. He spent two months recovering in a facility in Florida before quitting the firm and then began working with Olivia. He is shown to be a womanizer, even though he gets engaged to his girlfriend, Georgia, in the first season. By the second season, he left the firm and moved to Boston, "married Georgia and is living a normal life". In the fourth season, he is revealed to be living in St. Petersburg and working for the Russian oligarchy.

=== Harrison Wright ===
Harrison Wright, portrayed by Columbus Short, was a litigator who worked with Olivia. He was bright and loyal to her. He worked in Takoma Park before he started working for Adnan Salif, making himself wealthy. When Salif went down for insider trading, Harrison received only a sentence of six months in jail because Olivia defended him pro bono. Harrison had a brotherly relationship with Quinn and he looked out for her. He calls Olivia's team "gladiators in suits". In the season two premiere, he is working on Quinn's case and although he knows it will be hard to win, he believes in her innocence. He is shocked when the judge rules in their favor and the case is dismissed. He becomes closer to Quinn and the two become good friends, having drinks together in the office. He was murdered by B613 in the season three finale after working out that it was responsible for the murder of President Grant's son, Jerry, to ensure his re-election and the reactivation of B613.

=== Abby Whelan ===
Abby Whelan, portrayed by Darby Stanchfield, is an ambitious woman who worked as an investigator in Olivia's firm and currently serves as the White House Press Secretary. Abby was married to Charles Putney, the youngest son of former Virginia governor James Putney. She left him when he beat her in a drunken rage. Olivia got a tire iron and broke Charles's kneecap. She also helped Abby get the best divorce attorney in the state to help her get out of her marriage. Abby is extremely loyal to Olivia because she helped her get her life back together, but she gets angry with her when she doesn't act like the Olivia who helps people. In the season two premiere, she helps Olivia with Quinn's case, even though she believes that she is guilty. Abby was sleeping with AUSA David Rosen after she found his wall with pictures of Quinn and Olivia all over it when she broke into his house. However, after Olivia found out about their relationship, she asked Harrison to end it. Harrison bribed Rosen's ex-girlfriend to say he beat her up to force Abby to break up with him.

=== Quinn Perkins ===
Quinn Perkins (née Lindsay Dwyer), portrayed by Katie Lowes, works with Olivia. She is revealed in the season two premiere to be Lindsay, on trial for murdering her ex-boyfriend and six other people. She had called her boyfriend, threatening him after she found out that he cheated on her. A mysterious package, which turns out to be a bomb, shows up at his workplace, killing him and six other people. It is revealed that Quinn ran away to a hotel room, frightened by what happened and that someone broke in and injected her with a sedative; she woke up in Washington, D.C., with a new identity. She is acquitted of all charges after Olivia makes a phone call. Olivia and Huck have something to do with her past, because Huck is shown in front of Quinn's hotel, then getting into Olivia's car and driving away. Quinn is extremely caring and has a brotherly relationship with Harrison Wright. She was dating reporter Gideon Wallace who was murdered by Billy Chambers. In season two, Quinn accepts Huck as her espionage and technology mentor, ultimately leading her down the path of embracing her dark side. In season six, she becomes engaged to fellow B613 agent, Charlie.

=== Huck Finn ===
Huck Finn (né Diego Muñoz), portrayed by Guillermo Díaz, works as a tech guy in Olivia's firm. He is extremely loyal to her, willing to do anything she asks of him. Olivia found the homeless Huck while she was working on the Grant campaign. She took a shine to him and brought him coffee every day. Prior to knowing Olivia, and after serving in the Marines, Huck was blackmailed into joining a top secret CIA subdivision called B613, where he was trained to torture and murder American "traitors". He discovered he actually took pleasure in hurting people, but was conflicted and tried to avoid the torturing. Olivia, knowing his history, asked him to use what he knew, but only in desperate situations. When she asked him to find Amanda Tanner's body, to return to her father, Huck tortured the man who originally trained him, until he revealed the whereabouts of the body. In the season two premiere, it is revealed that it was Huck and Olivia who left the new identity for Quinn. Huck is known to attend Alcoholics Anonymous meetings; though he is not an alcoholic, he discusses "drinking whiskey" as a euphemism for his past as a torturer. In season two, Huck tutored Quinn in espionage and technology, but much to his chagrin he awakened something dark within her.

=== Cyrus Beene ===
Cyrus Rutherford Beene, portrayed by Jeff Perry, is the White House Chief of Staff. He is a quiet man but is extremely ambitious, calculating, and extremely loyal to the president, even willing to kill to protect him. He was Olivia Pope's mentor and is her good friend. Cyrus was Fitz's campaign manager during his gubernatorial campaigns and his first presidential run, and brought Olivia on after they lost Iowa in the presidential primaries. He is shocked when he learns about the affair between Olivia and Fitz. He is extremely upset when he learns about Amanda Tanner and that Olivia is representing her and he goes as far as to convince the president to allow him to "wage war" with Olivia. It is revealed that he contracted Charlie (the B613 agent) as a freelance assassin to kill Amanda Tanner so she would not publicly come forward with her pregnancy. When Cyrus tells Olivia that the president is giving up the White House for her, he tells her some men can't be normal, changing her mind and helping her get Fitz and Mellie back together. Cyrus is gay and married to James Novak, a political journalist. Cyrus and Olivia are on good terms toward the end of season one, working together to save Fitz's presidency, although Olivia makes it clear that she knows what Cyrus is capable of when the president "lets him off his leash". Throughout season two, Cyrus is struggling with keeping Defiance (a vote manipulation scheme which bent the presidential election towards Fitz based on tampering of the voting machines in Defiance County, Ohio) from coming to light, helping Fitz with his decision-making and keeping his husband James from finding out the truth. He even adopts a baby girl for James, knowing that it is what he wants for their relationship. When Cyrus believes Hollis was responsible for Fitz's attempted assassination, he hires his own assassin to "end the problem", showing that he is willing to go to great lengths to protect everything Defiance worked for. He even goes as far as to nearly kill James for being David's witness to their conspiracy, but calls it off at the last minute. Ten months after Verna's funeral, he is shut out by Fitz for his involvement in the rigging, no longer able to give advice or influence the president's decisions. Eventually he begins to regain the President's trust, and by the early-middle part of season three the president has stopped shutting him out, and they are more or less back on decent terms with each other, but he is no longer trusted by the President unconditionally, and all of his advice is scrutinized closely. Beene runs the presidential campaign for Francisco Vargas, later becomes his running mate, and is a suspect when Vargas is assassinated.

=== Fitzgerald Grant ===
Fitzgerald "Fitz" Thomas Grant III, portrayed by Tony Goldwyn, is the President of the United States, a Republican former Governor of California from Santa Barbara, a Rhodes Scholar, Harvard law graduate, and decorated former US Navy fighter pilot. Fitz was attached to a carrier-based attack fighter squadron flying air support missions in tandem with US Navy special operations during the Gulf War in 1991, which is how he met Jake Ballard, the only man whom President Grant always unconditionally trusts. He is in love with Olivia Pope and wants to divorce his wife to be with her. While Fitz does care for his wife Mellie, he is not in love with her, and has remained in his marriage at the urging of his chief of staff Cyrus Beene to maintain his approval ratings and to help his chances for a second term. He started his affair with Olivia on the campaign trail and has been seeing her ever since, even though their relationship is hard to manage. He sleeps with Amanda Tanner when he becomes upset that Olivia won't see him. He started to lie about it to Olivia at first, but then revealed the truth. They are caught together by Cyrus, who tells Fitz that Amanda Tanner is blackmailing him and Olivia Pope is now representing her. When Olivia won't talk to him, he goes to her house and they sit together on the couch holding each other. When the news breaks about what Billy did, Fitz is happy because he views this as a chance to get out of his marriage and be a normal man with the woman he loves, but Olivia stops this and helps him get back with his wife, upsetting and confusing him. While Olivia has tried moving on and tried keeping a professional relationship, Fitz constantly tries to force affections with her and even sneaked away to be at her house. In season two, he is troubled by whether to invade East Sudan and by his wife Mellie's pregnancy. Fitz and Olivia are at a standstill in their relationship because she wants to move on, to do the right thing and he won't let her because he loves her. When Olivia stops taking his calls, he does not handle it well and Cyrus tells him that he is "ticking". Fitz finally tells Olivia that he is ending their relationship when he invites her to a restaurant, saying that he is not being responsible to Mellie, Olivia and America and that he needs to be a better man. After being nearly assassinated on his birthday, Fitz was left in a coma for a short period of time before returning to office. The near-death experience left him a changed man, with some minor brain damage which causes him to lose his fear of doing what he wants for himself. He demanded a divorce from Mellie to be with Olivia, not caring if he loses his position as president and is loathed by the American people. This changed when Verna reveals everything about Defiance and her part in his assassination attempt, all to preserve her legacy. He kills her to preserve his own legacy and shut out everyone involved with Defiance. Ten months later, Fitz has developed a drinking problem and has become more forceful and rash in his decisions, believing that he does not have anyone he can trust, except for Jake Ballard, whom he increasingly turns to more and more for advice and help handling very sensitive and problem-fraught situations for him.

=== David Rosen ===
David Rosen, portrayed by Joshua Malina, was an Assistant U.S. Attorney; early in season three, he becomes the United States Attorney for the District of Columbia, and finally, early in season four, United States Attorney General for the Grant administration. He is a stickler for the law, believing that it is his job to uphold it. He often says that he wears "the white hat". He and Olivia have a friendly rivalry going on when she gets involved in the cases he prosecutes. He is a good guy, willing to help Olivia – within the law. In the last episode of the first series, he discovers Quinn's true identity and in the season two premiere, he is prosecuting Quinn, even recommending the death penalty. When the judge rules in favor of the defense, David is shocked, because he has a solid case against her. When he spots Olivia and asks what she did, she just smiles and walks away. David was sleeping with Abby Whelan to gain more information on the case he lost against Olivia, though he was actually starting to like her. This ended when Abby left him after she believed that he beat up his last girlfriend. When David finally gathered enough information, he realized that the bombing in Cytron was a cover for the fact that the presidential campaign was rigged. He decided to dig deeper into the conspiracy that was covering this up, even using Cyrus Beene's husband James Novak to help him gather evidence and be his witness in court. However, when James is brought to the witness stand and lies about finding anything, David loses his chance to go forward with his prosecution. Ten months later, David loses his position as Assistant U.S. Attorney and is reduced to teaching an intro course at a D.C. school. He hates Olivia and her team for ruining his life, but turns to them for help when he is framed for murder. He then steals the card proving the election was rigged and gives it to Billy Chambers. However, it is then revealed that the card he gave Billy was fake and that David was just pretending to help him. He proves that Billy is the mole and gets him arrested. President Grant then makes him United States Attorney for the District of Columbia. As a parting gift, David sends Olivia a pure white Stetson, reminding her that she must continue wearing the metaphorical and now the literal white hat. He feels haunted while in the presence of Jake Ballard, after the latter shoots three people right in front of his eyes, but allows Rosen to walk away, after agreeing to follow any of the directives Ballard decides to give him going forward. Rosen is a typically arrogant character, he claims to be "the law" just because he is a senior legal official in the show.

=== Mellie Grant ===
Melody "Mellie" Margaret Grant, portrayed by Bellamy Young, is an empowered woman, graduate of Yale (undergrad) and Harvard Law, both top of her class, and comes from a wealthy, patrician Southern family with "Mayflower" and "DAR blue blood." She is the First Lady of the United States, being Fitz's wife, and later Senator of Virginia. She is a strong but cold and calculating woman, willing to do anything to stay in the White House. Mellie does love her husband; she was a lawyer and gave up her career to support him. Olivia is shocked to learn that Mellie not only knew about Fitz's affair with her, but said nothing about it. She blames Olivia for the Amanda Tanner situation (reasoning that if Olivia had "played her part" as Fitz's mistress, Tanner would never have gotten involved at all). At the end of season one, she is planning to leave her husband after he tells her that he doesn't care about the presidency anymore and just wants to live a normal life. Olivia stops Mellie and brings her back to Washington, D.C., to help Olivia save Fitz's presidency and his marriage. It is possible that Mellie resents Olivia's status, due to her having a career and Fitz's love. In season two, after Fitz survives an assassination attempt, they hate each other more than ever, with Fitz now insistent on getting a divorce and Mellie beginning to overstep the bounds of her position's authority. She now wants to be included in security meetings and is threatening Cyrus to get what she wants, but he's not buying it. After Fitz is nearly assassinated and demands a divorce from her, Mellie induces her pregnancy in a last-ditch effort to keep them together as well as maintain her position as First Lady. After Fitz finds out about Defiance and stays with Mellie, she tries to side with him and keep him from overworking, even putting all the blame on Cyrus for the rigging. When Fitz begins drinking, Mellie tells him that his children didn't want to spend time with him, due to his changing behavior and that she wasn't going to force them to visit if they didn't wish for it. She tells him he needed to get over Olivia's deception. In season three, it is revealed that Mellie was raped by Fitz's father, "Big Jerry". Then, in season four, Mellie is elected US Senator for Virginia. Finally, at the end of season five, Grant won the 2016 Republican Presidential Primaries, and become the GOP Presidential Nominee, along with their running mate, Jacob "Jake" Ballard. At the end of season 6 and from 7 on, she is the President of the United States, being the first woman to hold that office.

=== Jake Ballard ===
NSA Director Jacob "Jake" Hamilton Ballard (né Pete Harris), portrayed by Scott Foley, is a former U.S. Navy intelligence officer attached to the Joint Chiefs of Staff who spies on Olivia Pope at the personal request of President Grant, with whom he served in the Navy during the first Gulf War. As a result of their service and many missions together, Ballard is the only man whom President Grant unconditionally trusts. Ballard's outstanding physical condition and highly advanced level of combat/tactical training suggests that he has a special forces background; which would give some insight into how he and the President know each other. Fitz was attached to a carrier-based attack fighter squadron flying air support missions in tandem with U.S. Navy special operations, where he naturally came into contact with many operators from the Navy SEALs, of which Ballard was presumably one. He was also a member of the elite CIA black ops division called B613, with Eli "Rowan" Pope the program's director. Jake was recruited by Eli during his time in the Navy. Eli offers Jake a choice to change his life and leave behind the life he knew as Pete Harris. He grew up with his mother, alcoholic father and younger sister. Eli used Jake's guilt of not protecting his sister from his father's nightly visits and death of his brother/nephew after the suicide of his to manipulate Jake into accepting Rowan as his "Father." Eli originally tasked Jake to wedge himself between the President and Olivia by becoming a new love interest, until he defied orders, resulting in his dismissal and imprisonment in "the hole" at a B613 dark site until being freed when Olivia convinced her father to do so. At the end of season three, he replaces Rowan Pope as "Command", the director of B613. As Command, he decides to assassinate 3 of the 4 members of the group investigating the suspicious death of Daniel Douglas, Vice President Sally Langston's husband: NSA staffer Shelby Moss, White House correspondent Vanessa Chandler, and White House Press Secretary James Novak, Cyrus Bean's husband. Moss and Chandler's bodies were buried in a forested unmarked grave; Novak's was left on the street and staged to look like the result of a carjacking. Eventually, Olivia discovers that B613 was behind the deaths and confronts him, hysterically screaming, "you told me you'd be different [as Command]...but immediately you became my father!!). Ballard insists that he is different, because when the dirtiest parts of his job become necessary, he does them himself, instead of delegating it to one of his many, highly capable subordinates to do so. At the end of season three, Rowan is brought in by the President to assist with finding his ex-wife's terrorist handler and they chafe against each other's authority. Jake doesn't get fired, but through a twisted turn of events Rowan eventually gets reinstated as Command and Jake flies off with Olivia to a remote island off the coast of Zanzibar for 4 months ("standing in the sun"). Jake was named the director of the National Security Agency, and then 2016 Republican vice-presidential nominee.

=== Elizabeth North ===
Elizabeth North, portrayed by Portia de Rossi, is the chairwoman of the Republican National Committee and a political advisor to the First Lady during her senate campaign; she became the Chief of Staff when Cyrus Beene was fired by the president and was later the Vice President's Chief of Staff. She was killed by Samantha Ruland.

=== Marcus Walker ===
Marcus Walker, portrayed by Cornelius Smith Jr., is a civil rights activist, a former client of Olivia's firm and White House Press Secretary for President Fitzgerald. During Mellie's campaign for presidency, Walker helps her through tough moments. In season 6, they grow closer and eventually hook up. At the end of season 7, Mellie signs a bill into law in the Oval Office and is seen standing with Marcus, suggesting that he might be the first First Gentleman of the United States.

=== Eli Pope ===
Elijah "Eli/Rowan" Pope, portrayed by Joe Morton, is Olivia Pope's father, 'Command' of the elite black ops program B613, and often the show's main antagonist. He also works for the Smithsonian Institution.

=== Charlie ===
Charlie (né Bernard Gusky), portrayed by George Newbern, is a B613 assassin and rival of Huck who occasionally freelances for Cyrus. He helps recruit Quinn into B613 and develops a relationship with her but leaves after discovering that she was cheating on him with Huck. Once they get back together, he eventually asks Quinn to marry him, which she accepts and later finds out she's pregnant with his baby.

== Recurring characters ==
Table containing actors and characters and their recurring capacity throughout the show's seasons
Actor	Character	Seasons						
Actor	Character	1	2	3	4	5	6	7
Brian Letscher	Tom Larsen	Recurring	Recurring	Recurring	Recurring	Recurring	Recurring	Guest
Kate Burton	Sally Langston	Recurring	Recurring	Recurring	Recurring	Recurring	Guest	Recurring
Erica Shaffer	Reporter Julia	Guest	Recurring	Recurring	Recurring	Recurring	Guest	Recurring
Dan Bucatinsky	James Novak	Recurring	Recurring	Recurring	Guest		Guest	
Matt Letscher	Billy Chambers	Recurring	Recurring					
Brenda Song	Alissa	Recurring	Recurring					
Troy Winbush	Morris Elcott	Recurring	Guest	Guest				
Liza Weil	Amanda Tanner	Recurring						
Brendan Hines	Gideon Wallace	Recurring						
Sharmila Devar	Lauren Wellman		Recurring	Recurring	Recurring			
Samantha Sloyan	Jeannine Locke		Recurring	Recurring				
Tom Amandes	Samuel Reston		Recurring	Recurring				Guest
Gregg Henry	Hollis Doyle		Recurring	Guest		Recurring	Guest	Guest
Norm Lewis	Edison Davis		Recurring	Guest		Recurring		
Debra Mooney	Verna Thornton		Recurring				Guest	
Kurt Fuller	Grayson Osborne		Recurring					
Wendy Davis	Kimberly Mitchell		Recurring					
Jay Jackson	Mike Waters		Recurring	Guest	Guest	Recurring	Recurring	Recurring
Molly Baker	Rachel Moss		Guest	Guest	Recurring	Guest	Guest	Recurring
Jasika Nicole	Kim Muñoz		Guest	Guest	Recurring	Guest		
Jaden Bettes	Javi Muñoz		Guest		Recurring	Guest		
Kimrie Lewis	Reporter Ashley Davidson			Recurring	Recurring	Recurring	Guest	Recurring
Paul Adelstein	Leo Bergen			Recurring	Recurring	Guest	Recurring	
Jon Tenney	Andrew Nichols			Recurring	Recurring	Guest		
Khandi Alexander	Maya Pope			Recurring	Recurring		Recurring	Recurring
Mary Mouser	Karen Grant			Recurring	Guest	Guest		
Vanya Asher	Ethan			Recurring	Recurring	Recurring		
Lisa Kudrow	Josie Marcus			Recurring				
Dylan Minnette	Jerry Grant Jr.			Recurring				
Jack Coleman	Doug Langston			Recurring				
Nazanin Boniadi	Adnan Salif			Recurring				
Matthew Del Negro	Michael Ambruso				Recurring	Recurring	Recurring	
Artemis Pebdani	Susan Ross				Recurring	Recurring		
Brian White	Franklin Russell				Recurring	Guest		
Tina Lifford	CIA Director Lowrey				Recurring		Recurring	
Joelle Carter	Vanessa Moss					Recurring		
Jessalyn Gilsig (Note: Gilsig replaced Carter for season six.)	Vanessa Moss						Guest	Guest
Ricardo Chavira	Francisco Vargas					Recurring	Recurring	
Mía Maestro	Elise Martin					Recurring		
Annabeth Gish	Lillian Forrester					Recurring		
Danny Pino	Alex Vargas					Recurring		
Rose Abdoo	Senator Linda Moskowitz					Recurring		
John Prosky	Senator Gibson					Recurring		
Nancy Stafford	BNC Anchor						Recurring	Recurring
Zoe Perry	Samantha Ruland						Recurring	
Tessie Santiago	Luna Vargas						Recurring	
Chelsea Kurtz	Jennifer Fields						Recurring	
Phoebe Neidhardt	Meg Mitchell						Recurring	
David Warshofsky	Theodore Peus						Recurring	
Jay Hernandez	Curtis Pryce							Recurring
Dean Norris	Fenton Glackland							Recurring
Michael O'Neill	Lonnie Mencken							Recurring

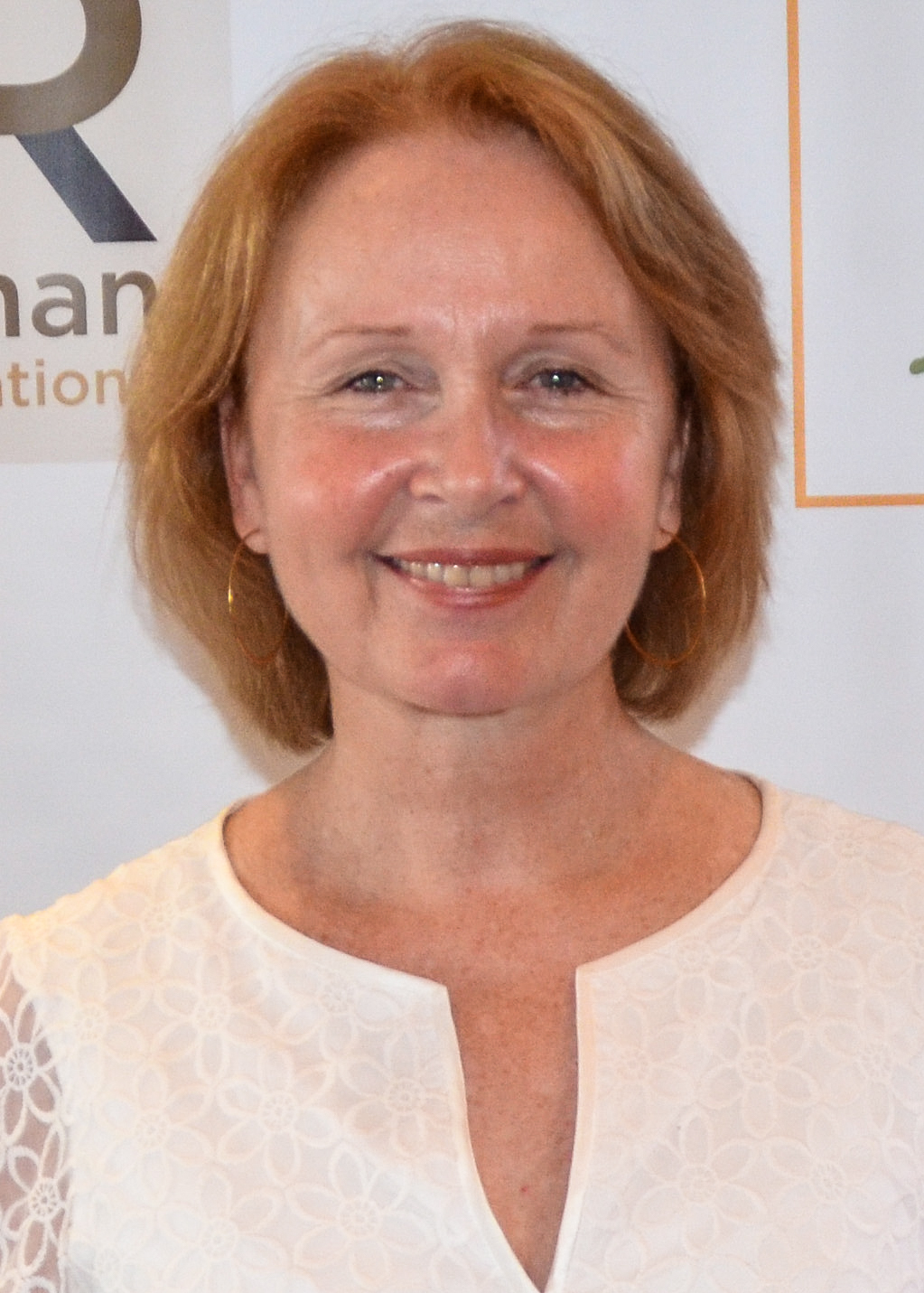
Kate Burton (Sally Langston)

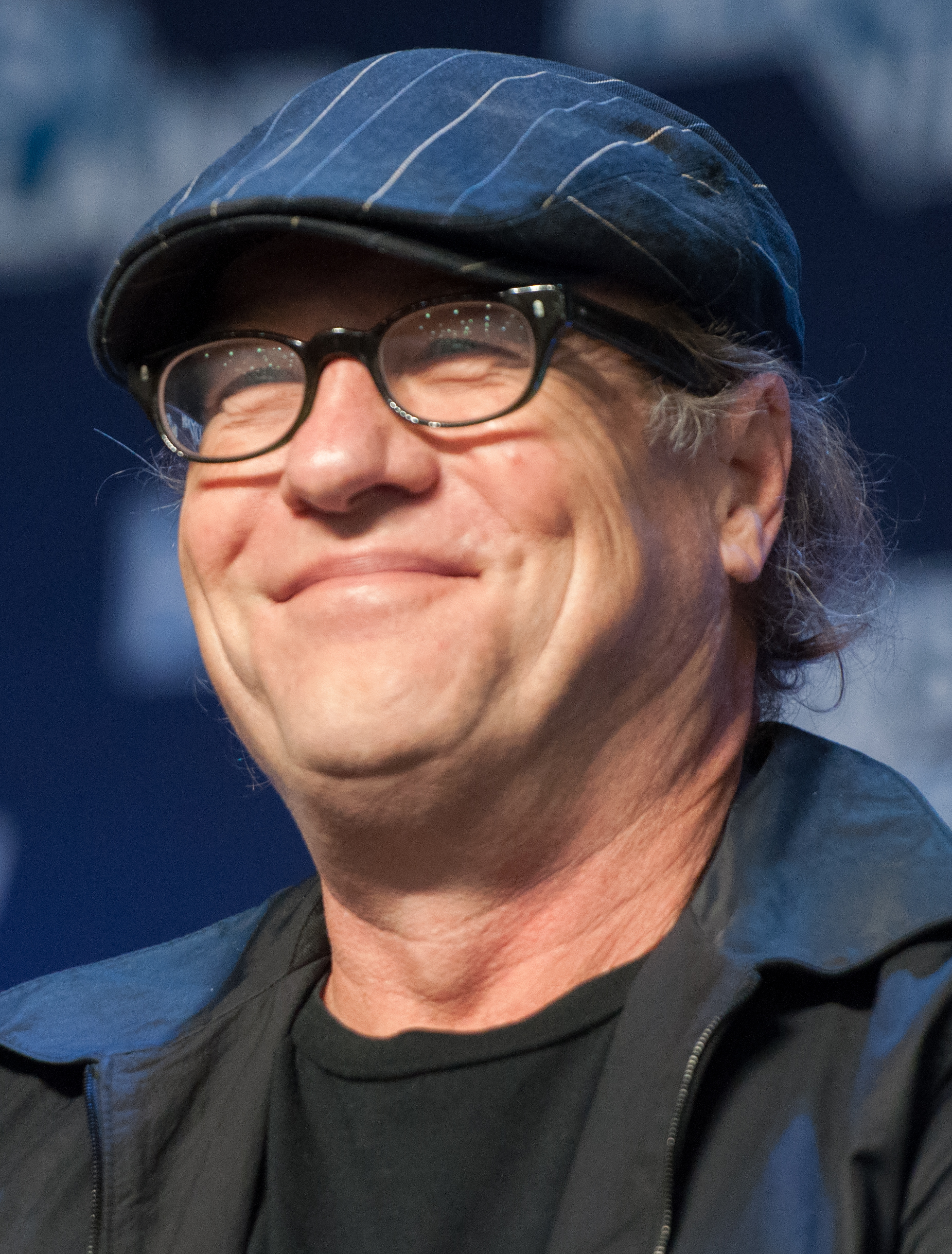
Gregg Henry (Hollis Doyle)

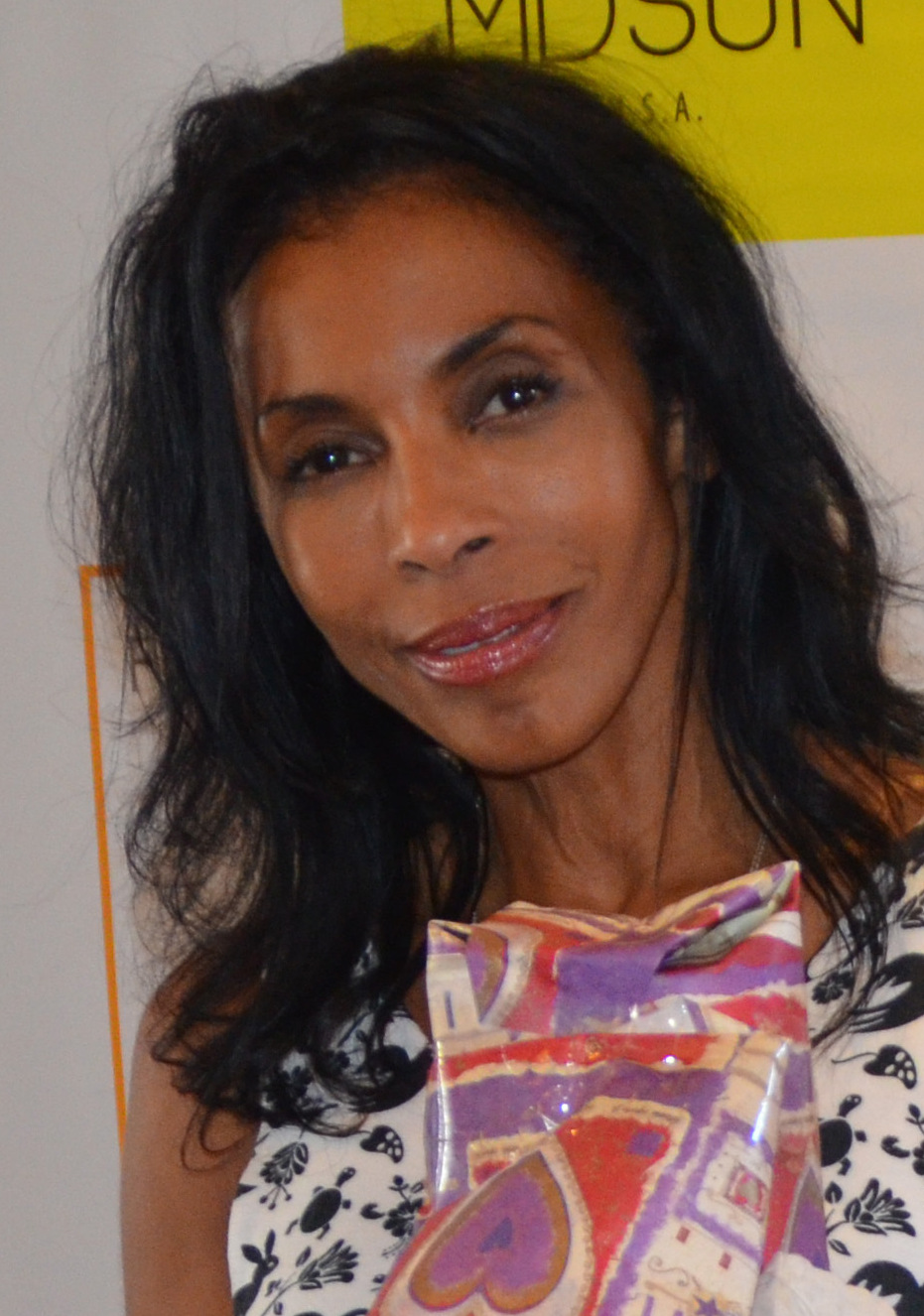
Khandi Alexander (Maya Lewis)

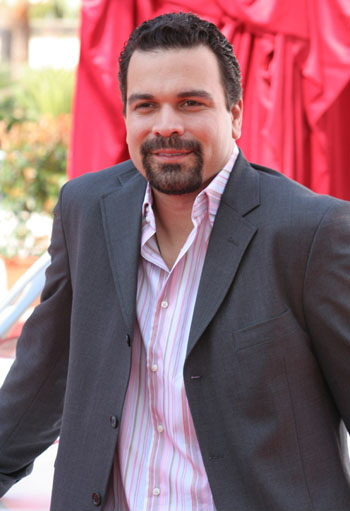
Ricardo Chavira (Francisco Vargas)

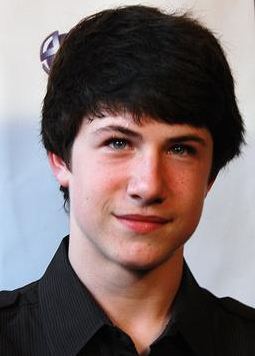
Dylan Minnette (Jerry Grant Jr.)

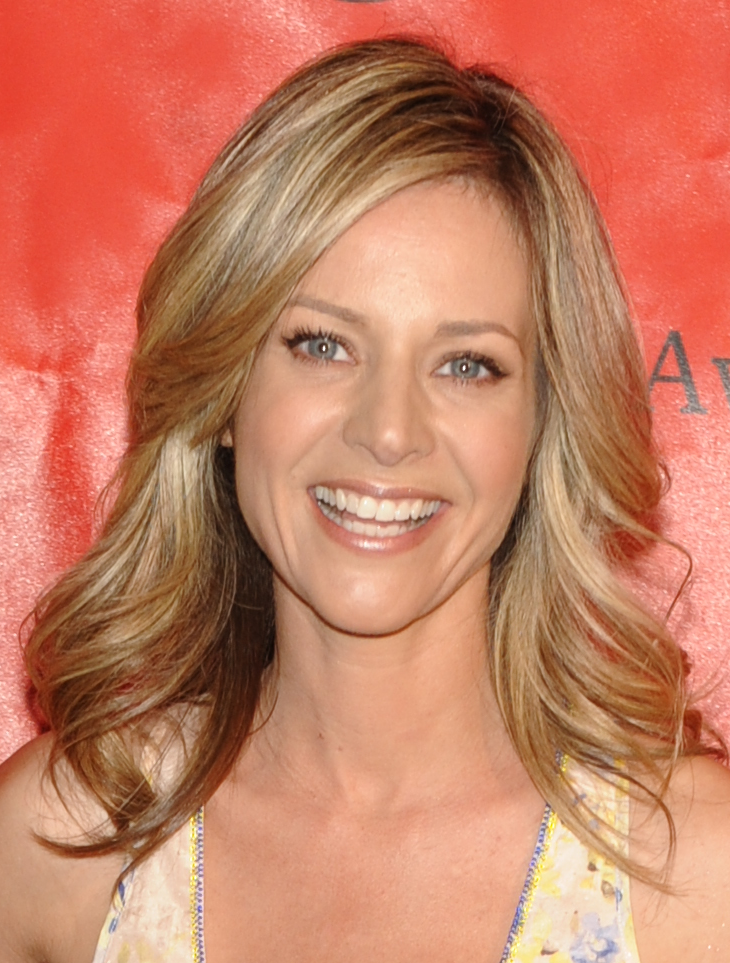
Jessalyn Gilsig (Vanessa Moss)

=== Introduced in season 1 ===
- Sally Langston (Kate Burton), the former Vice President of the United States, is significantly more conservative than Grant, under whom she served. Langston was vying for the Republican nomination prior to the series timeline, but eventually accepted Grant's offer to be his VP. Her self-righteousness and Bible-thumping irritate the liberal Republicans in the White House. She killed her unfaithful husband in a rage and had Cyrus help her cover it up. Despite this, she decided to run as an independent candidate to replace Grant but did not resign from being vice president. During the third-season finale, Sally was projected to win the election, but lost at the last minute due to the public's sympathy over the death of Fitz's son Jerry. She then joined a conservative cable-news network as host of The Liberty Report.
- Tom Larsen (Brian Letscher) is a Secret Service agent for President Grant, also secretly a B613 agent responsible for the death of Fitz's son Jerry.
- James Novak (Dan Bucatinsky) was Cyrus' husband and father to Ella Novak-Beene. A former Pulitzer Prize nominated print journalist in addition to also being a former television interviewer. He was killed by Jake Ballard.
- Billy Chambers (Matt Letscher) was Chief of Staff to the Vice President and campaign manager of Langston for President.
- Alissa (Brenda Song) is David Rosen's former office assistant.
- Amanda Tanner (Liza Weil) was a White House intern who claimed she had an affair with the President of the United States. It was eventually revealed that she was pregnant.
- Gideon Wallace (Brendan Hines) is a reporter for the tabloid newspaper The D.C. Sun, who seeks to expose the details of the Amanda Tanner story.

=== Introduced in season 2 ===
- Verna Thorton (Debra Mooney) was an Associate Justice of the Supreme Court who was nominated for the bench by Fitzgerald Grant shortly after becoming president. She had prior served as a member of the 'Defiance' group and as a friend/advisor to both Fitzgerald Grant II and III.
- Senator Edison Davis (Norm Lewis) is a former boyfriend of Olivia Pope who once asked her to marry him before ending their relationship when she declined. He is a Democrat and serves as a US Senator from Florida and eventually the Senate Majority Leader.
- Hollis Doyle (Gregg Henry) is the CEO of Doyle Industries, an oil company and major financial donor to the Grant presidential campaign. He was responsible for the Cytron bombing and was suspected to be behind the attempt on Grant's life. In season 2, Doyle turns to Olivia and her associates for help when his daughter goes missing.
- Grayden Osborne (Kurt Fuller) is the former Director of the CIA for the Grant Administration.
- Kim and Javi Muñoz (Jasika Nicole and Jaden Betts) are Huck's ex-wife and child, respectively.
- Teddy Grant (Itai & Gilad Caldwell) is the newborn son of Fitz and Mellie.
- Ella Novak-Beene (Amiya & Aniya Ricks) is the adopted daughter of Cyrus and James. Following James' assassination, she's left prominently under the care of nannies and later Cyrus' second husband, Michael. When Michael eventually leaves Cyrus, he takes Ella with him, now the primary caregiver of the little girl.

=== Introduced in season 3 ===
- Maya Lewis (Khandi Alexander) is Olivia Pope's mother, who goes by the alias 'Marie Wallace', a self-professed "facilitator" for terrorists, long thought killed in the shooting of Global World Flight 522 that took place when Olivia was twelve. Maya was held in a high-security prison by Rowan until she escaped and was helped by Olivia to leave the country. But she escaped from the plane after killing the pilot and other crew members and stayed in Washington. Alexander's portrayal of Lewis has been compared to activist Assata Shakur.
- Leo Bergen (Paul Adelstein) is a highly skilled, quick-witted political consultant who goes to work for Sally Langston after turning down Cyrus's offer to run Fitz's re-election campaign. After Langston narrowly loses the election to Grant, Leo remains in D.C. as a political consultant and fixer, consulting for various politicians and also as the boyfriend of Abby Whelan.
- Andrew Nichols (Jon Tenney) was the former Lieutenant Governor of California who succeeded Fitzgerald Grant as governor when Grant became president. He and Mellie have had an affair while Fitz and Pope were having their own. Andrew, in season 4, was responsible for the kidnapping of Olivia Pope and sequent attempt to sell her for other countries' runners as a way to take down Fitz.
- Josephine "Josie" Marcus (Lisa Kudrow) is a U.S. Congresswoman from Montana, war widow and Democratic candidate for President of the United States.
- Daniel Douglas Langston (Jack Coleman) was Sally Langston's husband and a Second Gentleman.
- Jerry Grant (Dylan Minnette) is Fitz and Mellie's son who is named after Fitz's father. He was killed by Tom Larsen via a poison injection. Larsen was sent by Eli Pope.
- Karen Grant (Madeline Carroll and Mary Mouser) is the daughter of Fitz and Mellie. She goes to Olivia once a video of her having sex with two boys almost gets leaked.
- Adnan Salif (Nazanin Boniadi) is Harrison Wright's mysterious former associate when he was on Wall Street before he got arrested for insider trading. She hired Maya to plan and coordinate the terrorist attack on U.S. soil intended to kill President Grant.

=== Introduced in season 4 ===
- Michael Ambruso (Matthew Del Negro) is a former prostitute who was hired by Elizabeth North to seduce Cyrus. Photos of Michael and Cyrus leaked soon afterwards and compromised the public image of Cyrus. As a solution, Cyrus and Michael get married despite their dislike of each other.
- Susan Ross (Artemis Pebdani) is a Senator from Virginia chosen to be the Vice President for Fitz's second term. In season five, she runs for president but later drops out realizing she doesn't belong to the White House.
- Franklin Russell (Brian White) is an undercover agent working for Rowan.

=== Introduced in season 5 ===
- Elise Martin (Mia Maestro) was a spy and Jake's former partner.
- Lillian Forrester (Annabeth Gish) is a reporter with an attraction to Fitz.
- Vanessa Moss (Joelle Carter and later Jessalyn Gilsig) is Jake's wife. It was revealed that Jake and Rowan were working together to take all of Moss' family money in order to launch Jake for presidency.
- Francisco Vargas (Ricardo Chavira) is the governor of Pennsylvania and Democratic candidate for president. In season six, Vargas wins the election and, minutes after the results are announced, he is shot twice, killing him instantly. It was later revealed that he was shot by Eli Pope, who was following orders from Theodore Peus and Samantha Ruland, while themselves were Francisco's wife Luna's minions.
- Alex Vargas (Danny Pino) is Francisco's brother, a member of his campaign team and Cyrus' rival.

=== Introduced in season 6 ===
- Samantha Ruland (Zoe Perry) was the one who worked with Theodore Peus to make sure that Mellie won the Presidential election and becomes the President. She also approached Meg to kill Jennifer and Huck.
- Luna Vargas (Tessie Santiago) was the widow of the President-elect of the United States Francisco Vargas, was briefly the 50th Vice President of the United States until her death, and the mastermind behind Francisco's assassination.
- Theodore Peus (David Warshofsky) was one of Luna's minions who co-worked with Samantha.
- Meg Mitchell (Phoebe Neidhardt) was Francisco Vargas' campaign statistician. She also collaborated with Luna Vargas and Samantha Ruland's plot. She was tortured to death by Quinn after she was kidnapped by Quinn and Charlie. She provoked Quinn by telling her that Huck wasn't in love with her.
- Jennifer Fields (Chelsea Kurtz) was Francisco Vargas' campaign videographer. She was shot by Meg, who claimed to be her friend.

=== Introduced in season 7 ===
- Curtis Pryce (Jay Hernandez) is the host of a politics-related talk show who argues with Olivia when he interviews her. He later goes to her office at the White House to ask her to dinner, to which she denies. However, she appears at a restaurant and tells him to go to an apartment where she would be waiting for him.
- Farid Rashad (Faran Tahir) was the President of Bashran, invited to the United States to negotiate a nuclear-arms treaty. He and Mellie developed feelings for one another, but Olivia had him and his niece Yasmeen killed when Mellie was prepared to go to war for him.
- Fenton Glackland (Dean Norris) is a businessman and wannabe politician. He has a brief relationship with Cyrus before leaving him after being tortured by Charlie.
- Robin (uncredited baby actors) is the newborn daughter of Quinn and Charlie. Robin is what Charlie called Quinn as they started dating meaning "sidekick"
- Lonnie Mencken (Michael O'Neill) is hired by Cyrus to oversee the investigation of the hijacking of Air Force Two, helping to frame Mellie.
