= Scandal season 1 =

Season of American television series Scandal

Scandal
- Season 1
- Home media cover
- Starring: Kerry Washington; Henry Ian Cusick; Columbus Short; Darby Stanchfield; Katie Lowes; Guillermo Diaz; Jeff Perry; Tony Goldwyn
- No. of episodes: 7

Release
- Original network: ABC
- Original release: April 5 – May 17, 2012

Season chronology
- Next → Season 2

The first season of the ABC American television drama series Scandal premiered on April 5, 2012, and concluded on May 17, 2012, with a total of 7 episodes.

== Plot ==
This season introduces Olivia Pope and the various members of her firm, as well as President of the United States Fitzgerald Grant (Tony Goldwyn) and Cyrus Beene (Jeff Perry), his chief of staff. The season focused on the lives of the team members, the relationship between Olivia and the president (her former employer), and the mystery surrounding Amanda Tanner's (Liza Weil) involvement with the White House, among other cases the team solved.

== Cast and characters ==
=== Main ===
- Kerry Washington as Olivia Pope
- Henry Ian Cusick as Stephen Finch
- Columbus Short as Harrison Wright
- Darby Stanchfield as Abigail "Abby" Whelan
- Katie Lowes as Quinn Perkins
- Guillermo Diaz as Huck
- Jeff Perry as White House Chief of Staff Cyrus Beene
- Tony Goldwyn as President Fitzgerald "Fitz" Thomas Grant III

=== Recurring ===
- Joshua Malina as David Rosen
- Bellamy Young as First Lady Melody "Mellie" Grant
- Brendan Hines as Gideon Wallace
- Matt Letscher as Billy Chambers
- Liza Weil as Amanda Tanner
- Dan Bucatinsky as James Novak
- Kate Burton as Vice President Sally Langston
- Brian Letscher as Tom Larsen
- George Newbern as Charlie

=== Guest stars ===
- Mimi Kennedy as Sharon Marquette
- JoBeth Williams as Sandra Harding
- Valerie Cruz as Carolina Flores
- Brenda Song as Alissa
- Samantha Sloyan as Jeannine Locke
- Wes Brown as Lieutenant Sully St. James

== Episodes ==
No. overall	No. in season	Title	Directed by	Written by	Original release date	Prod. code	U.S. viewers (millions)
1	1	"Sweet Baby"	Paul McGuigan	Shonda Rhimes	April 5, 2012	101	7.33
Quinn Perkins comes to what she believes to be a blind date, only to find that she is now getting offered a job at Pope & Associates, a job that she's dreamed about for a while; Olivia Pope and Stephen work on getting a Russian ambassador's baby back from kidnappers. Just as they are all about to leave, Lieutenant Sully St. James comes in pleading for help as his girlfriend has just been murdered; then Olivia gets a call from Cyrus because a woman named Amanda Tanner has been saying that she has been sleeping with the president and requests her help. After Olivia talks to, and indirectly threatens, Amanda, Quinn questions if she wants the job. Olivia goes to David Rosen asking for 36 hours so they can clear Sully's name; As the clock ticks down, Abby and Stephen look for concrete evidence for Sully's alibi, eventually finding a security camera that reveals Sully kissing another man. Sully refuses to admit that he is gay, as he is both a military officer and a conservative; Quinn convinces Olivia that Amanda isn't lying as the president called her 'Sweet Baby', a name that rings a bell to Olivia. She goes to the Oval Office and admits to Fitz that she knows he slept with Amanda. He kisses her, revealing that they have a romantic history. Cyrus hears Olivia yelling at Fitz and comes in to check on them, only to find them kissing. Olivia finds out that Fitz never told Cyrus about their relationship. Olivia leaves and then persuades Sully to admit his homosexuality by telling him he can't change who he is and he shouldn't be ashamed of that, and then accepts Amanda as her new client.
2	2	"Dirty Little Secrets"	Roxann Dawson	Heather Mitchell	April 12, 2012	102	7.28
Pope & Associates' new client is one of the biggest madams in all of D.C., Sharon Marquette, who is about to go to jail for the rest of her life since one of her girls got caught and ratted her out. David shows up at OPA to arrest Sharon who refuses to give up her client list to the feds. Olivia gets all of her clients into one room and gets them to use their political power to get Sharon out of jail. Olivia finds that Cyrus took away her access to the White House. Olivia sets Quinn up to look after Amanda, only to find that she walked away from the hospital; Abby finds herself jealous when she sees that Stephen was on the list of people that slept with one of the madam's call-girls. Olivia goes to Amanda only to find that Amanda doesn't want anything to do with her; Quinn meets a reporter named Gideon (Brendan Hines) and finds that he is looking to make a story out of Amanda trying to kill herself. One of the names on the 'client list' is Fitz's candidate to be on the Supreme Court, Patrick Keating, but when they question him they find that he doesn't know anything about it; Olivia finds that his wife that he slept with years ago is actually the call girl Stacy, linking him to the list of Sharon’s clients, and convinces her to tell him the truth. Fitz and Olivia watch Patrick and his wife argue, and Fitz tries to make amends with Olivia. Fitz gives back Olivia's access to the White House, while Amanda comes to Olivia saying that she wants help. Gideon finds that he has a story. The madame is put out of business and her clients endorse Keating so that their secrets are never revealed to the public, per Olivia's orders.
3	3	"Hell Hath No Fury"	Allison Liddi-Brown	Matt Byrne	April 19, 2012	103	7.21
Pope & Associates' current client is a man who is being charged with rape, even though the stories don't add up. Mellie begins to worry about Fitz when she finds that he isn't sleeping anymore. Amanda moves in with Olivia and requests that she have a meeting with the President. While investigating the 'rape', Harrison finds that the defendant's best friend committed suicide after being raped by their client, and that she was framing him for rape to get revenge. Mellie invites Olivia to the Presidential Ball, finding that he'll be able to sleep now; Quinn starts flirting with Gideon in an effort to find out the information that he knows on Amanda. After talking to her client, Olivia convinces her to turn her son into the police, even though the woman he raped is already dead; Cyrus talks Olivia out of meeting with the president at 'their spot'; Fitz finds that Mellie knew about his affair with Olivia the entire time. Even with Olivia canceling the meeting, Amanda requests that the meeting be put back on; Cyrus finds that someone recorded Fitz and Amanda having sex. Amanda confesses to Olivia that she's pregnant with the president's child.
4	4	"Enemy of the State"	Michael Katleman	Richard E. Robbins	April 26, 2012	104	6.86
A South American dictator comes to Pope & Associates when he finds out that his family has been kidnapped; Cyrus begins digging into everyone in Pope & Associate's backgrounds. Olivia finds that her world is upside down when Amanda's pregnancy test come out to be true; Quinn begins going on dates with Gideon, but is skeptical that he says that he doesn't need her as a source anymore because he has someone else. Abby and Finch find that General Flores's wife didn't really get kidnapped, that she attempted to leave him, but when Abby takes it into her own hands to help her, Olivia returns them back to the general, causing Abby and Olivia to get into a fight. Gideon begins researching everything about Amanda Tanner and the president, while Fitz begins wondering what would happen if everything came out into the public. Olivia helps the general's wife leave her husband, and eventually convinces him to let her take the children. In the middle of the night, Amanda Tanner is kidnapped from Olivia's house, while she and the rest of the 'Gladiators' prepare for the trial; Cyrus and Olivia come to blows and decide that it is now a full blown 'war'.
5	5	"Crash and Burn"	Steve Robin	Mark Wilding	May 3, 2012	105	6.69
With Amanda Tanner missing, everyone at Pope & Associates is looking for clues to find her, that is until they get a call that a plane crashed in the woods of Virginia. Olivia works to find the truth about what truly happened, as the pilot had been accused of drinking the night before the plane crashed. Huck gets in touch with someone that he knew before he began working for Olivia, because he found footage linking him to the kidnapping of Amanda. Olivia then asks Huck to go back and do what he knew how to do best; Harrison and Abby find that one of the reports from the plane was copied, meaning that there was something wrong with the plane. Stephen finds it hard to find information out the same way he used to now that he is engaged; President Fitz begins to try to pass an act called the 'Dream Act', and the vote comes down to Vice President Sally Langston, who eventually agrees to pass it. Huck finds out where Amanda's body is, and they go in search to find it; Fitz gets angry when he finds he can't leave the White House. Stephen finds that Amanda's baby wasn't the president's and Fitz shows up at Olivia's apartment.
6	6	"The Trail"	Tom Verica	Jenna Bans	May 10, 2012	106	6.43
As Gideon investigates Amanda Tanner's past, a series of flashbacks reveals the contentious primary race between Fitzgerald Grant and Sally Langston, Olivia's first meeting with Grant on the campaign trail, and the formation of the Pope & Associates team. The flashbacks delve into Olivia's life and her past is slightly more eventful than she's letting on.
7	7	"Grant: For the People"	Roxann Dawson	Shonda Rhimes	May 17, 2012	107	7.33
OPA rushes to help Quinn when she finds herself in Gideon's apartment next to his body. They decide to clean up the crime scene in order to avoid exposing Quinn to the law. A reluctant Cyrus must turn to Olivia when Billy Chambers makes a public announcement that he had a relationship with Amanda Tanner and that the president took advantage of her, and because of it he resigns. Cyrus, Fitz and Olivia discuss how to move forward, and Fitz suggests that he resign as well. He tells Olivia that if he isn't president they can be together.

== Reception ==
The series has been met with a generally favorable response from critics, with many being intrigued by the mysteries on the show and praised the show for having an African-American lead role. The series started with generally positive reviews from critics. The review aggregator website Rotten Tomatoes reports an 87% approval rating with an average rating of 6.60/10 based on 31 reviews. The website's consensus reads, "Scandal is a soapy show about work and love that's over the top but never boring." Metacritic gave the show a rating of 66 out of 100 based on 33 reviews.

== Ratings ==
=== Live + SD ratings ===
No. in series	No. in season	Episode	Air date	Time slot (EST)	Rating/Share (18–49)	Viewers (m)
1	1	"Sweet Baby"	April 5, 2012	Thursday; 10:00 P.M.	2.0/6	7.33
2	2	"Dirty Little Secrets"	April 12, 2012	Thursday; 10:00 P.M.	2.0/6	7.28
3	3	"Hell Hath No Fury"	April 19, 2012	Thursday; 10:00 P.M.	2.0/6	7.21
4	4	"Enemy of the State"	April 26, 2012	Thursday; 10:00 P.M.	2.0/6	6.86
5	5	"Crash and Burn"	May 3, 2012	Thursday; 10:00 P.M.	1.9/5	6.69
6	6	"The Trail"	May 10, 2012	Thursday; 10:00 P.M.	1.9/6	6.43
7	7	"Grant: For the People"	May 17, 2012	Thursday; 10:00 P.M.	2.3/7	7.33

=== Live + 7 Day (DVR) ratings ===
No. in Series	No. in Season	Episode	Air Date	Timeslot (EST)	18–49 rating increase	Viewers (millions) increase	Total 18–49	Total viewers (millions)	Ref
1	1	"Sweet Baby"	April 5, 2012	Thursdays; 10:00 P.M.	0.7	1.84	2.7	9.21	
2	2	"Dirty Little Secrets"	April 12, 2012	Thursdays; 10:00 P.M.	—N/a	—N/a	—N/a	—N/a	
3	3	"Hell Hath No Fury"	April 19, 2012	Thursdays; 10:00 P.M.	—N/a	1.69	—N/a	8.90	
4	4	"Enemy of the State"	April 26, 2012	Thursdays; 10:00 P.M.	—N/a	—N/a	—N/a	—N/a	
5	5	"Crash and Burn"	May 3, 2012	Thursdays; 10:00 P.M.	—N/a	—N/a	—N/a	—N/a	
6	6	"The Trail"	May 10, 2012	Thursdays; 10:00 P.M.	—N/a	—N/a	—N/a	—N/a	
7	7	"Grant: For the People"	May 17, 2012	Thursdays; 10:00 P.M.	—N/a	1.74	—N/a	9.07	

== Awards and nominations ==
Award	Category	Nominee	Result
ALMA Award	Favorite TV Actor – Supporting Role in a Drama	Guillermo Díaz	Nominated
NAACP Image Award	Outstanding Writing in a Dramatic Series	Shonda Rhimes ("Sweet Baby")	Nominated

== DVD release ==
Scandal: The Complete First Season
Set Details	Special Features
7 Episodes; 2-Disc Set; English (Dolby Digital 5.1 Surround); English SDH, Spanish and French subtitles; Runtime: 303 minutes	Scandal: Setting The Pace; Gladiators in Suits: Casting a Series; Scripting Scandal
Release Dates
Region 1	Region 2
June 12, 2012	October 7, 2013
