= Watch Me =

Watch Me may refer to:

== Music ==
- Watch Me (album), by Lorrie Morgan, 1992
  - "Watch Me" (Lorrie Morgan song), 1992
- "Watch Me" (Bella Thorne and Zendaya song), 2011
- "Watch Me (Whip/Nae Nae)", a song by Silentó, 2015
- "Watch Me!", a song by Yoasobi, 2025
- Watch Me, a mixtape by Ronnie Radke, 2013
- "Watch Me", a song by Anohni from Hopelessness, 2016
- "Watch Me", a song by G-Unit from The Beauty of Independence, 2014
- "Watch Me", a song by Jaden Smith from Syre, 2017
- "Watch Me", a song by James Brown from Universal James, 1993
- "Watch Me", a song by Jay-Z from Vol. 3... Life and Times of S. Carter, 1999
- "Watch Me", a song by Labi Siffre, 1972
- "Watch Me", a song by Little Brother from The Minstrel Show, 2005

== Other uses ==
- Watch Me (horse) (foaled 2016), a French Thoroughbred racehorse
- "Watch Me" (Scandal), a television episode
- Watch Me, a 2014 autobiography by Anjelica Huston
- Watch Me, a 2025 novel by Tahereh Mafi

== See also ==
- Just watch me (disambiguation)
- Look at Me (disambiguation)
