= Look at Me =

Look at Me may refer to:

== Film ==
- Look at Me (2004 film), a French drama
- Look at Me, a 2008 film directed by Dan Turner
- Look at Me (2022 film), a documentary film on rapper and singer XXXTentacion
- Look at Me (2024 film), a drama film directed by Taylor Olson

== Music ==
=== Albums ===
- Look at Me: The Album, by XXXTentacion, 2022
- Look at Me, a 2006 album by Cadillac Don & J-Money
- Look at Me, a 2005 album by Pace Wu

=== Songs ===
- "Look at Me" (Geri Halliwell song), 1999
- "Look at Me" (John Lennon song), 1970
- "Look at Me" (Mirrors song), 2009
- "Look at Me (I'm in Love)", by the Moments, 1975
- "Look at Me (When I Rock Wichoo)", by Black Kids, 2008
- "Look at Me!", by XXXTentacion, 2015
- "Look at Me", by Alan Jackson from Billy: The Early Years, 2008
- "Look at Me", by Band-Maid from Brand New Maid, 2016
- "Look at Me", by Buddy Holly from Buddy Holly, 1958
- "Look at Me", by Dobie Gray, 1963
- "Look at Me", by Engelbert Humperdinck, 1977
- "Look at Me", by FFS from FFS, 2015
- "Look at Me", by Freddie Gibbs and The Alchemist from Alfredo, 2020
- "Look at Me", by Sugababes from One Touch, 2000
- "Look at Me", by Sum 41 from Underclass Hero, 2007
- "Look at Me", by Twice from Twicetagram, 2017
- "Look at Me", by Why Don't We from The Good Times and the Bad Ones, 2021
- "Look At Me", by Psapp from The Monster Song, 2008

== Other media ==
- Look at Me (new Capitoline Wolf), a 2011 art installation by Paweł Wocial
- Look at Me (novel), a 2001 novel by Jennifer Egan

== See also ==
- Look at Me Now (disambiguation)
- Watch Me (disambiguation)
