= Melody "Mellie" Grant =

Mellie Grant
- Scandal character
- First appearance: "Sweet Baby" (1.01); April 5, 2012
- Last appearance: "Over a Cliff" (7.18); April 19, 2018
- Created by: Shonda Rhimes
- Portrayed by: Bellamy Young

In-universe information
- Full name: Melody Margaret Grant
- Nicknames: Mellie; Mel; Mels
- Title: Madam President
- Occupation: 45th President of the United States; Governor of Virginia; First Lady of the United States
- Spouse: Fitzgerald Thomas Grant III (Ex-Husband)
- Children: Jerry Grant Jr. (Son); Karen Grant (Daughter); Teddy Grant (Son)

Melody Margaret "Mellie" Grant is a fictional character created by Shonda Rhimes for the political drama television series Scandal. The character is played by actress Bellamy Young and was a recurring character on all seven seasons of Scandal. During the first season, Grant was a guest character on the series before becoming a main character in season two.

In the sixth season of Scandal, Grant became the 45th President of the United States, also making her the series first "recognized" female president. Before serving as POTUS, she was the First Lady to the 44th President of the United States, Fitzgerald Thomas Grant III. During this time, Grant also became the Governor of Virginia.

Grant is incredibly intelligent and regarded as a political animal. She is highly knowledgeable about foreign policy, public opinion, and all-around political warfare. She graduated at the top of her class at Harvard Law, leading to her meeting Fitzgerald Grant.

== Character background ==
Grant is described as a Southern Belle from Asheville, North Carolina with deep Southern roots. She refers to herself in the series as a "Tar Heel". She comes from a patrician, landowning family that once owned a plantation and slaves but also had a history of moonshining. Her husband describes her as being of "old money" with "Mayflower" and "DAR blue blood." She graduated from law school and was a partner at a law firm prior to her husband's political career.

== Storylines ==
=== Season One ===
In the first season of Scandal, we are introduced to the "Southern Belle" portrayal of Mellie Grant on the outside; she is sweet, classy, and polished, but behind that classy exterior is a true political animal. She is shown as the blockade to Fitzgerald Grant & Olivia Pope's affair. It is also revealed in this season that, while she is the blockade, Mellie knew about the affair. Even claiming Pope broke Fitz's heart, which allowed ("That snake") Billy Chambers to use Amanda Tanner to get into his pants.

=== Season Two ===
Season two takes a shocking turn as it is revealed that Grant, alongside former White House Communications Director Olivia Pope, Fitzgerald Grant's Chief of Staff Cyrus Beene, Supreme Court Justice Verna Thornton, and billionaire politician Hollis Doyle, was involved in Operation Defiance. Defiance was the conspiracy group responsible for rigging the 2010 Election. The group rigged a voting machine in Defiance County, Ohio, United States. During the first half of season two, President Fitzgerald Grant is incapacitated after being shot in a planned attempt by Rebecca Flynn, who was paid by Supreme Court Justice Verna Thornton. This act places Vice President Sally Langston as the Acting President of the United States of America. Mellie Grant, knowing Langston can't be trusted, commits an act of forgery, signing a legal document that enacts the provisions of the 25th Amendment of the United States Constitution. Langston plans to contest the document before a jury of White House officials. In a last-minute moment, Fitzgerald Grant enters the meeting, stopping Langston from moving forward and allowing him to regain his full powers as President.

=== Season Three ===
Season three reveals some deep and traumatic wounds for the First Lady; it is revealed that during Fitzgerald Grant's campaign to become President, his father, "Big" Jerry Grant, raped Mellie. Shortly after, she found out she was pregnant and did not know whether the paternity of her oldest child belonged to Big Jerry or Fitzgerald Grant. Mellie soon realizes that if she wants to retain her position and power inside the White House, she needs Olivia Pope to work for Fitz again; she does so by asking Fitzgerald Grant's security detail to bring her to a room where she asks Olivia to "Come back to us." She even claims, "He needs you, so I need you..."

At the end of the season, Grant is projected to lose to Sally Langston in the 2014 Presidential Election, and Eli Pope assists in preventing this by having B613 operative and White House security detail, Tom Larsen, kill Jerry Grant Jr. This act compels America to vote for Grant's reelection, keeping him and his party in the White House for another four years. At the end, Mellie realizes that she got what she wanted even if it wasn't the way she had wanted. During this season, Mellie also starts an affair with Vice President Andrew Nichols, after it is revealed he saved her from a suicide attempt by drug overdose.

=== Season Four ===
Season four sees a complete character change for Mellie, who takes on the news headline of "Smelly Mellie" and is no longer concerned with keeping up her professional appearance or showcasing herself to the world as the pretty and polished Southern girl. She is unfazed by multiple things, as she is unable to cope with the loss of her son, changing her for the worse. Mellie is confronted by now-White House Press Secretary Abby Wheelan, who gets through to her enough for her to make one appearance before breaking down in the White House, finally coming to terms with her son's loss. Grant continues her affair with Nichols; however, it is cut short after Grant finds out Nichols had Pope kidnapped to force Fitzgerald III into a war with West Angola for political gain. Grant threatens Nichols, which falls flat as Nichols threatens to tell the public about his affair with Grant. She then recruits the help of Olivia Pope & Associates, specifically Diego "Huck" Munõz, who would inject Andrew with a paralyzing chemical, essentially giving him a stroke.

Mellie realizes very quickly that she needs some sort of political capital instead of simply being a First Lady; she then ventures towards the Governor of Virginia. During this venture, Grant falls into a trap laid by the head of B613, Rowan (Eli Pope). He threatens to expose images of Grant with Nichols if he doesn't get the name of the sixteen jurors who listened to a private hearing about B613; she complies, and it ultimately ends up costing her, as every person who heard Jake Ballard's testimony was assassinated. Grant does win the position of Virginia Governor; however, this victory is short-lived as Fitzgerald Grant catches wind about the meeting with Rowan and figures out she caused the indirect death of the sixteen jurors. He kicks Mellie out and asks for a divorce.

=== Season Five ===
Although she is hesitant and against it in the beginning, Mellie does eventually sign the divorce papers, releasing both parties from the loveless marriage. After the public finds out about Fitz and Olivia's affair, Fitz takes Olivia out on a very public date to protect her from racist and sexist media attacks. Seeing Fitz show Olivia this level of public devotion triggers Mellie. She goes straight to the women's Senate caucus and gives them the green light to initiate impeachment proceedings. Before Fitz can get impeached, Olivia & Mellie strike a deal, releasing the former's father from captivity and, in exchange, Rowan would blackmail the Senate committee into dropping the impeachment investigation entirely. For Mellie doing this, Olivia Pope will make Mellie Grant the President of the United States of America. During the second half of Season Five, Mellie delivers one of her most impressive moments: she stands on the U.S. Senate floor and delivers a 16-hour filibuster on Planned Parenthood funding. Grant makes it all the way to hour 16 with some help from Olivia Pope & Vice President Susan Ross.

Mellie hires Olivia to run her political campaign, and in turn, Olivia forces her to write a tell-it-all memoir, detailing things about her life and, most importantly, why Mellie chose to stay after knowing he had an affair with a person in the White House (Olivia herself). Mellie confides in her later that she stayed because it gave her an out. This is the exact reason Olivia didn't stay with Fitz because Mellie gave her an out.

Mellie joins the Republican primaries; she is put against Hollis Doyle & Vice President Susan Ross. Olivia Pope gets Hollis Doyle to drop out of the primary race after taping a conversation in which he confirms he is not actually racist or as unintelligent as his republican followers. Susan is removed after Pope reveals David Rosen's involvement in getting Susan's favor by dropping a case illegally. Mellie is selected as the runner for the Republican Party. Mellie selects Captain Jake Ballard as her running mate for Vice President. The season ends with Mellie getting ready to face Democratic nominee Francisco Vargas.

=== Season Six ===
In season six, we see the effects of season five roll over as Mellie Grant loses the election against Vargas; however, the victory is short-lived as Vargas is assassinated while the celebration takes place. Mellie now has to fight with Cyrus Beene to figure out the next official president of the United States. Olivia Pope finds out her father assassinated Vargas after receiving threats from a shadow group of Samantha Ruland & Peus. After Ruland kills Grant's Chief of Staff, Elizabeth North. They notify her that Ruland is now her Chief of Staff and everything done should be reported to them, putting them in a compromising position. Peus arrives at OPA and forces Pope to kick Ballard off the ticket with himself. After Peus & Ruland are eliminated by Ballard & Rowan, respectively. Tom Larsen lies to the White House, claiming he killed Frankie Vargas as a ploy to get back at Cyrus Beene, claiming he had ordered him. This costs Cyrus Beene his freedom, as he is arrested, leaving the Electoral College no choice but to vote Melody Grant as the 45th President of the United States and the first official Female President of the United States. It is also revealed that a plot was in place to kill Grant.

During this time, Luna Vargas is chosen as the Vice President of the United States; however, Pope realizes an inconsistency with the seating charts at Frankie Vargas' place of death. She confronts his wife about the attempt to assassinate Grant, which reveals a bigger plan in which Luna set up the whole plan to become the President of the United States, listing comparisons to Jackie Kennedy, claiming that if Jackie had become President after her husband, John F. Kennedy's, death, she would have gotten everything she wanted. Pope gives her pills that kill her and leaves Grant without a Vice President. Grant would choose Cyrus Beene as her replacement.

=== Season Seven ===
Season seven sees Pope & Grant running the White House. This is quickly ended as Grant becomes uncomfortable with Pope's dark manner; Mellie fires her after learning she is responsible for the bombing of a plane containing President Farid Rashad. Mellie appoints Ballard as her Chief of Staff, which serves the same purpose as Olivia Pope, as he then takes over B613. Lonnie Mencken and Jake Ballard weaponize a special congressional committee to investigate Mellie, aiming to impeach her and take over the White House. They attempt to frame Mellie for the Hijacking of Air Force Two, which Cyrus is also a part of. This impeachment would make him the President of the United States of America.

In a last ditch effort, Olivia Pope, Mellie Grant, Huck, Abby Wheelan, Quinn Perkins, Marcus Walker, Fitzgerald Grant, Tom Larsen, Hollis Doyle, & Rowan Pope, all testify to the reality of B613, the court decides to arrest Jake Ballard and claim he had been running the United States and B613 because as Rowan puts it, America would throw a fit if they found out a Black man had been running the country.

The people who testified are free from the restraints holding them and can move on from B613; Cyrus Beene "signs his Letter of Resignation." Pope would resign, claiming she is finished fixing other people's problems. The series ends with Grant standing in the sun in her new administration, alongside her lover Marcus Walker.
