= Look at Me Now =

Look at Me Now may refer to:

- Look at Me Now (Bernie Marsden album), 1981
- Look at Me Now (Onefour album), 2025
- Look at Me Now! (Dick Haymes album), 1957
- "Look at Me Now" (Bryan White song), 1994
- "Look at Me Now" (Chris Brown song), 2011
- "Look at Me Now", a song by Sixwire from Sixwire, 2002
- "Look at Me Now", a song by Breed 77 from In My Blood (En Mi Sangre), 2006
- "Look at Me Now", a song by Caroline Polachek from Pang, 2019
- "Look at Me Now", a song by the Electric Light Orchestra from The Electric Light Orchestra, 1971
- "Look at Me Now", a song by Gucci Mane from Delusions of Grandeur, 2019
- "Look at Me Now", a song by Iyaz from Replay, 2010
- "Look at Me Now", a song by Maisie Peters from It's Your Bed Babe, It's Your Funeral, 2019
- "Look At Me Now", a song by miwa from DAITAN!, 2020
- "Look at Me Now", a song by Wang Chung from Points on the Curve, 1983
- "Look at Me Now", a song by Young Buck from Straight Outta Cashville, 2004

== See also ==
- Look at Her Now, a 2019 song by Selena Gomez
- Look at Me (disambiguation)
- Oh! Look at Me Now
