= Just watch me (disambiguation) =

Just watch me is a phrase made famous by Canadian Prime Minister Pierre Trudeau.

Just Watch Me may also refer to:

- Just Watch Me: Trudeau and the '70s Generation, a 1999 Canadian documentary film by Catherine Annau
- Just Watch Me: The Life of Pierre Elliott Trudeau Vol. 2: 1968-2000, a 2009 book by John English
- Just Watch Me: Remembering Pierre Trudeau, a 1984 book by Larry Zolf
- Just Watch Me..., a 2002 romance novel by Julie Elizabeth Leto
- Just Watch Me, an unreleased album by Jordan McCoy, or the title song
- "Just Watch Me", a song by G. Hannelius
- "Just Watch Me", a song by Kate Voegele from her 2014 Wild Card EP

== See also ==
- "You Just Watch Me", a song by Tanya Tucker
- Watch Me (disambiguation)
