= Sweet Baby (Scandal) =

- Scandal episode
- The cast of the first season of Scandal, all of whom appear in the pilot episode.
- Episode no.: Season 1 Episode 1
- Directed by: Paul McGuigan
- Written by: Shonda Rhimes
- Original air date: April 5, 2012

Guest appearances
- Joshua Malina as David Rosen; Bellamy Young as First Lady Mellie Grant; Wes Brown as Lt. Col. Sullivan St. James; Liza Weil as Amanda Tanner; Leslie Grossman as Lisa

Episode chronology
← Previous —	Next → "Dirty Little Secrets"
- Scandal (season 1)

"Sweet Baby" is the pilot episode of the American political thriller television series Scandal, which aired on American Broadcasting Company (ABC) on April 5, 2012. The episode was written by showrunner Shonda Rhimes and directed by Paul McGuigan. The episode introduces main character Olivia Pope, a crisis manager with her own firm, Olivia Pope & Associates, and its staff Stephen Finch, Harrison Wright, Abigail "Abby" Whelan, Huck and newly hired Quinn Perkins. Other main cast members include the staff at the White House in Washington D.C., President Fitzgerald "Fitz" Thomas Grant III, and White House Chief of Staff Cyrus Beene.

The episode was watched by an audience of 7.33 million, and received positive reviews from television critics.

== Plot ==
Quinn Perkins (Katie Lowes) comes to what she believes to be a blind date, only to find herself being interviewed by Harrison Wright (Columbus Short) for a job at Olivia Pope & Associates, a job that she's dreamed about for a while. At the same time, Olivia Pope (Kerry Washington) and Stephen Finch (Henry Ian Cusick) work on getting a Russian Ambassador's baby back from kidnappers, which Olivia successfully manages to do. Harrison takes Quinn to the office of OPA where she meets the other staff of the firm: Huck (Guillermo Diaz) and Abby Whelan (Darby Stanchfield). Just as they are all about to leave, Lieutenant Sully St James comes in pleading for help as his girlfriend has just been murdered; then Olivia gets a call from Cyrus Beene (Jeff Perry) because a woman named Amanda Tanner (Liza Weil) has been saying that she has been sleeping with the president and he requests her help.

After Olivia talks to, and indirectly threatens, Amanda, Quinn questions if she wants the job. Olivia goes to David Rosen asking for 36 hours so they can clear Sully's name; As the clock ticks down, Abby and Stephen look for concrete evidence of Sully's alibi, eventually finding a security camera that reveals Sully kissing another man. Sully refuses to admit that he is gay, as he is both a military officer and a conservative; Quinn convinces Olivia that Amanda isn't lying as the president called her 'Sweet Baby', the same name he used for Olivia. Olivia goes to the Oval Office to confront Fitz about Amanda where Fitz confesses his love for Olivia. Olivia persuades Sully to admit his homosexuality by telling him he can't change who he is and he shouldn't be ashamed of that, and then accepts Amanda as her new client.

== Production ==
"Sweet Baby" was directed by Paul McGuigan and written by showrunner Shonda Rhimes. The episode featured the songs "Respect Yourself" by American R&B/gospel group The Staple Singers, "Nothing Can Change This Love" by Sam Cooke and "The Winner Is" by DeVotchKa and Mychael Danna. The episode focuses on Quinn Perkins being hired at Olivia Pope & Associates and the team working on a case involving Lt. Col. Sullivan St. James, while at the meantime Olivia must handle a crisis regarding President Fitzgerald Grant.

In early 2011, it was announced that Shonda Rhimes was developing a new pilot. In February, Kerry Washington was cast as the leading role of the then titled In Crisis. Actress Gabrielle Union auditioned for this role alongside Washington before Washington was officially chosen. Henry Ian Cusick also landed a role in the series. On February 28, 2011, it was announced that Tony Goldwyn landed the role as the president. In May 2011, ABC picked up the pilot as a mid-season replacement. During the Winter Television Critics Association Press Tour, it was announced that the show would premiere April 5, 2012 after Grey's Anatomy, relocating Private Practice to Tuesday nights.

== Reception ==
=== Ratings ===
"Sweet Baby" was originally broadcast on Thursday, April 5, 2012 in the United States on ABC. The episode's total viewership was 7.33 million, and in the key 18-49 demographic, the episode scored a 2.0 in Nielsen ratings. The episode was the second best TV show in the 10:00 p.m. slot, beating Awake but was beaten by The Mentalist. Seven days of time-shifted viewing added on an additional 0.7 rating points in the 18–49 demographic and 1.84 million viewers, bringing the total viewership for the episode to 9.21 million viewers with a 2.7 Nielsen rating in the 18–49 demographic.
