= Brian Letscher =

American actor

- Education: University of Michigan
- Occupation: Actor
- Years active: 2001–present
- Relatives: Matt Letscher (brother); Aaron Letscher (brother)

Brian Letscher is an American actor best known for his recurring role as Secret Service Agent Tom Larsen on Scandal.

== Personal life ==
Letscher is the middle brother of actor Matt Letscher and entrepreneur Aaron Letscher. He attended college at the University of Michigan in Ann Arbor, Michigan and graduated in economics. He played football for the Michigan Wolverines football team. He was an assistant football coach at Eastern Michigan University from the Fall of 1997 through the conclusion of the 1999 season.

== Acting ==
Brian moved to New York City to pursue acting and after joining Public Theater Shakespeare Lab, he landed roles in films Kate & Leopold, Slippery Slope and Puccini for Beginners. He also had small roles in television Law & Order: Criminal Intent and Law & Order: Special Victims Unit and theatre Burning Blue. Brian also began working with The Purple Rose Theatre in Chelsea, Michigan. He played the lead role of Bo Decker in William Inge's Bus Stop and the production earned The Detroit Free Press' "Best Play" award. Brian became a produced playwright when The Purple Rose developed and produced a full equity run of his first play, "When The Lights Come On", about his experiences in the world of college football. Having been shifted to Los Angeles eight years ago, Brian has appeared in over two dozen television shows, most notably SCANDAL and CW's VALOR, and has become a member of The Pacific Residents Theatre Company, Rogue Machine as well as continuing to write and develop his own work.

== Writing ==
Brian has written multiple plays, having his first one "When The Lights Come On" produced by actor Jeff Daniels' The Purple Rose Theatre Company in Chelsea, MI. His next play, "Smart Love", world premiered at The Purple Rose in January 2017. "Smart Love" then had its West Coast Premiere at Pacific Resident Theatre in Venice, CA and received a "Critic's Choice" nod from the LA Times.

== Filmography ==
Film
Year	Film	Role	Notes
2001	Kate & Leopold	Ad Executive	
2006	Slippery Slope	Chad	
2006	Puccini for Beginners	Jeff	
2013	Running Up That Hill	Mr. Fash	Short film
2015	Orphan is the New Orange	Paul	Short film
2015	The Final Analysis		Short film
2016	Wake Up America!	Vincent Brandis	Short film
2018	Fading Scars	Ben	Short film
2019	Portrait of a Woman at Dawn	Jack Wakefield	Short film
2019	Loners	Lincoln Chalk	
2020	Wear a Mask, Bat Dick	Batman	Short film
2020	Veterans Day 2020, an adaptation of War Words	Chase	Short film
2023	Swindle	Mike	Short film

Television
Year	Title	Role	Notes
2003	NYPD Blue	Wally	Episode: "Porn Free"
2003 - 2005	Law & Order: Special Victims Unit	Patrick McCorkle / Paramedic	Episodes: "Raw" (2005) and "Soulless" (2003)
2006	All My Children	Dennis - Security Guard	Episode no 19435, 19449, 19432 and 19431
2006	Law & Order	Mark Rhodes	Episode: "Cost of Capital"
2007	Law & Order: Criminal Intent	Julie's Brother	Episodes: "Frame"
2008	How I Met Your Mother	Angry Man	Episode: "No Tomorrow"
2008	CSI: Crime Scene Investigation	Richard Langford	Episode: "Two and a Half Deaths"
2008	Law & Order: Criminal Intent	Diego	Episodes: "Brother's Keeper"
2008	NCIS	Sam Bennett	Episode: "Road Kill"
2009	Cold Case	Detective Pete McGinley	Episode: "Officer Down"
2009	Bones	Amos	Episode: "The Plain in the Prodigy "
2009	NCIS: Los Angeles	Marine CPL Scott Reilly	Episode: "Ambush"
2009	The Prospector	Caleb Montgomery	Short film
2010	Pretty Little Liars	Mr. Gazzaro	Episode: "There's No Place Like Homecoming"
2010	Sons of Tucson	Derek	Episode: "Ambush"
2010	The Mentalist	Billy Mock	Episode: "Red Carpet Treatment"
2011	Burn Notice	Ward	Episode: "Army of One"
2012	House of Lies	Derek Fielder	Episode: "Amsterdam"
2012	Hollywood Heights	Gus Sanders	25 episodes, recurring role
2012–2018	Scandal	Tom Larsen	33 episodes, recurring role
2013	Castle	Liam Finch	Episode: "The Wild Rover"
2014	Crisis	Flip	Episode: "Pilot"
2014	Perception	Shane McNamara	Episode: "Shiver"
2014	Grimm	Timothy Perkal	Episodes: "Octopus Head" and "Thanks for the Memories"
2014–2016	One & Done	Luke	7 Episodes, recurring role
2015	Hawaii Five-0	Mark Dupont	Episode: "Poina 'ole"
2019	Chicago Fire	Coach Snyder	Episode: "It Wasn't About Hockey"
2020	NCIS: New Orleans	James Keene	Episode: "Bad Moon Rising"
2020	Station 19	Agent Prine	Episode: "No Days Off"
2020	Magnum P.I.	Bruce	Episode: "Double Jeopardy"
2022	FBI: International	Mark Douglas	Episode: "Chew Toy"
2022	9-1-1: Lone Star	Griffin	2 Episodes
2022	Grey's Anatomy	Mr. Epley	Episode: "Haunted"
2024	S.W.A.T.	Sergeant Barry Jones	Episode: "End of the Road"
2024	Walker	Cole Tillman	Episode: "Letting Go"
2025	1923	Dr. Shilling	Episode: "Wrap Thee in Terror"
2025	FBI: Most Wanted	Jay Bradford	Episode: "Trust"
2025	Ballard	Ken Chastain	3 Episodes
2026	The Rookie	Kip Wilcox	Episode: “Grand Theft Aircraft”
