= Katie Lowes =

American actress and theater director (born 1982)

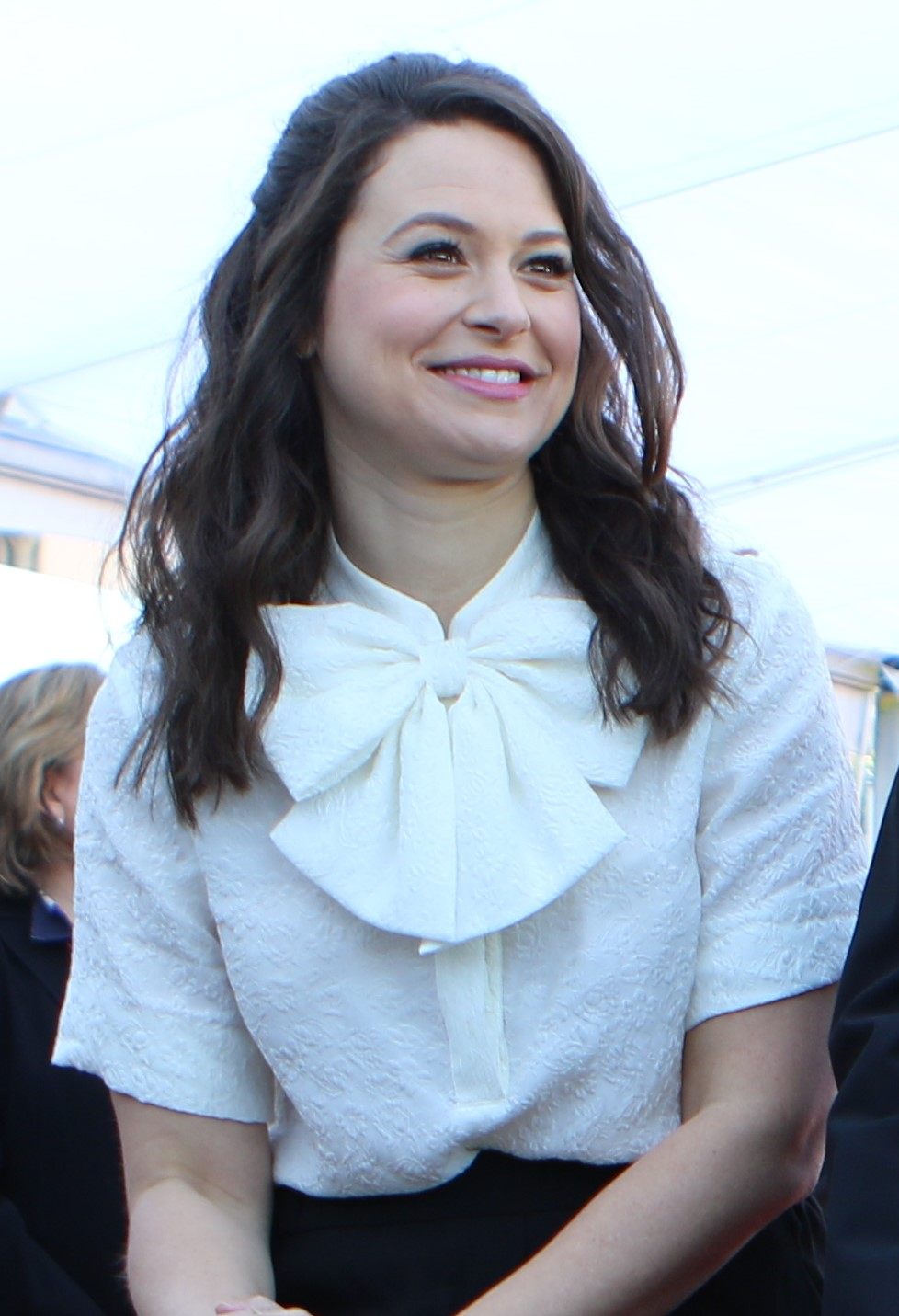
- Lowes at the 2016 SAG Awards Red Carpet Rollout
- Born: September 22, 1982 (age 44)
- Education: New York University (BFA)
- Occupations: Actress, theater director
- Years active: 2004–present
- Spouse: Adam Shapiro (m. 2012)
- Children: 2

Katie Quinn Lowes (born September 22, 1982) is an American actress and theater director. She is best known for her role as Quinn Perkins in the ABC political drama series Scandal (2012–2018) and her portrayal of Rachel DeLoache Williams in the Netflix drama series Inventing Anna (2022).

== Early life and education ==
Lowes grew up in Port Washington, New York, where she graduated in 2000 from Paul D. Schreiber Senior High School. She graduated from New York University's Tisch School of the Arts with BFA in acting. Her father is Irish Catholic, and her mother is Jewish.

== Career ==
She was cast in the stage play Four Saints in Mexico. In 2004, Lowes landed her first screen role in the FX series Rescue Me and later co-starred opposite Marcia Gay Harden in the Showtime pilot, Hate. Lowes later guest starred in a number of television series, including The Sopranos, Without a Trace, NCIS, Ghost Whisperer, Castle, Leverage, and The Closer. In 2008, she starred opposite Laurie Metcalf in The CW short-lived comedy-drama series, Easy Money. In addition to her television performances, Lowes appeared in a number of low-budget films, including The Job (2009), Bear (2010), and Café (2011).

Lowes is best known for her role as Quinn Perkins, formerly Lindsay Dwyer, in the ABC political drama series Scandal created by Shonda Rhimes. Before Scandal, Lowes had guest roles on Shonda Rhimes' Grey's Anatomy and Private Practice. Before landing her breakout role on the show, she worked as nanny for Connie Britton's adopted son.

With her husband, Adam Shapiro, she is one of the founders and directors of the Los Angeles-based IAMA Theater Company, and a supporter of Southern California's black box theater community.

In July 2018, Lowes made her Broadway debut, along with her husband Shapiro, in the Broadway production of Waitress. They remained in the production until October 7, 2018.

On May 14, 2021, CBS announced that Lowes would star opposite Pete Holmes in a sitcom based around the life of laid-off auto worker-turned-professional bowler Tom Smallwood. The multi-camera series mid-season debut was planned for the 2021–22 television season. On November 24, CBS announced the sitcom had been retitled How We Roll, and received an adjusted first season order of 11 episodes. On December 10, 2021, CBS announced the series would premiere on March 31, 2022. In May 2022, the series was canceled after one season.

Lowes played Rachel DeLoache Williams in Shonda Rhimes' Inventing Anna, a Netflix miniseries released in February 2022.

== Personal life ==
Lowes lives in Los Angeles with her husband, actor Adam Shapiro. Shapiro played her character's boyfriend in an episode of Scandal. In May 2017, she announced that she and her husband were expecting their first child, a boy. She announced the birth of their son, Albee Shapiro, on October 5, 2017. Lowes gave birth to their daughter, Vera Shapiro, on November 22, 2020.

== Filmography ==
=== Film ===
Year	Title	Role	Notes
2006	Quarter Life Crisis	Gemini	Direct-to-video
2008	No Man's Land: The Rise of Reeker	Hospital Intern	Direct-to-video
2009	Transformers: Revenge of the Fallen	April the Resident Assistant	
2009	The Job	Connie	Direct-to-video
2009	Circle of Eight	Elaine	Direct-to-video
2009	Chris Weisberg Is Growing Bald	Lexie	Short film
2010	Bear	Christine	Direct-to-video
2011	Phil Cobb's Dinner for Four	G-Friend	
2011	By the Time the Sun Is Hot	The Bride	Short film
2011	Super 8	Tina	
2011	Café	Kelly	Direct-to-video
2011	Callers	Mitzi	
2012	Wreck-It Ralph	Candlehead	Voice
2013	Side Effects	Conference Organizer	
2013	Frozen	Additional voices, motion work for "Let It Go"	Voice
2014	Big Hero 6	Abigail Callaghan	Voice
2016	Zootopia	Dr. Madge Honey Badger	Voice
2018	Ralph Breaks the Internet	Candlehead	Voice
2021	Vivo	Becky	Voice
2022	Merry Kiss Cam	Jess Wolfe	
2022	Strange World	Radio Host #2	Voice

=== Television ===
Year	Title	Role	Notes
2004	Rescue Me	Bloodied Girl	Episode: "Gay"
2004–05	As the World Turns	Megan	Recurring role
2005	Hate	Britney	TV pilot
2005	Guiding Light	Nurse Spector	Episode
2005	Damage Control	Sorority Rushee	Episode: "The Health Inspector"
2006	The Sopranos	Gillian	Episode: "Mr. & Mrs. John Sacrimoni Request..."
2006	Without a Trace	Robin Olson	Episode: "The Thing with Feathers"
2007	NCIS	Bryn Landers	Episode: "In the Dark"
2008	Ghost Whisperer	Julie Anderson	Episode: "The Gravesitter"
2008	Swingtown	Liz	Episodes: "Heatwave", "Take It to the Limit"
2008–09	Easy Money	Brandy Buffkin	Series regular, 8 episodes
2009	Castle	Rachel Maddox	Episode: "Home Is Where the Heart Stops"
2010	Leverage	Ashley Moore	Episode: "The Double Blind Job"
2010	Private Practice	Kendra	Episode: "Take Two"
2011	Grey's Anatomy	Blood Donor	Episode: "Unaccompanied Minor"
2011	The Closer	Andrea Hirschbaum	Episode: "To Serve with Love"
2012	Royal Pains	Carrie	Episode: "Dawn of the Med"
2012–18	Scandal	Quinn Perkins / Lindsay Dwyer	Series regular
2017–18	Voltron: Legendary Defender	Commander Ladnok	Voice, 4 episodes
2021	Christmas Takes Flight	Jenny Beckett	TV movie
2022	Inventing Anna	Rachel DeLoache Williams	Series regular
2022	How We Roll	Jen Smallwood	Main cast
2022	This Is Us	Arielle	2 episodes
2022	Love, Death & Robots	Elena	Voice, episode: "Three Robots: Exit Strategies"
2022	Zootopia+	Brianca / Molly Hopps / Mandy	Voice, episodes: "Hopp on Board", "The Real Rodents of Little Rodentia"
2023	The Continental	Continental Red Light Voice	Episode: "Theater of Pain"
2025	Law & Order	Victoria Beyer	Episode: "The Hardest Thing"
2025	The Hunting Wives	Jill	Main cast
