= Baby, It's Cold Outside (disambiguation) =

"Baby, It's Cold Outside" is a 1948 song by Frank Loesser.

Baby, It's Cold Outside may also refer to:

- Baby, It's Cold Outside (album), a 2001 Christmas album by Holly Cole
- Baby, It's Cold Outside (Cerys Matthews album), a 2012 album by Cerys Matthews
- "Baby It's Cold Outside" (Pezband song)
- "Baby, It's Cold Outside" (My Little Pony), a 1986 episode of My Little Pony
- "Baby, It's Cold Outside" (Home Improvement), a 1992 episode of Home Improvement
- "Baby, It's Cold Outside" (Scandal), a 2015 episode of Scandal
- "Baby It's Cold Outside", a song from the 1982 album "Outlaw" by the funk band War
- "Baby It's Cold Outside", the first part of the 2004 BBC documentary series The Power of Nightmares
- "Baby, It's Cold Outside", a 1978 episode of M*A*S*H (season 7)
- "Baby, It's Cold Outside", a 1991 Isaac Asimov short story

== See also ==
- "It's Cold Outside", a 1966 song by The Choir
- "Cold Outside", a song by country music band Big House
