= The ReFrame Stamp =

- Awarded for: Recognition of gender-balanced film and television productions featuring women in key roles
- Country: United States
- Presented by: ReFrame
- First award: June 8, 2018
- Website: reframeproject.org/stamp

The ReFrame Stamp for Gender-Balanced Production certification is awarded by ReFrame to corporations and media that show progress toward gender equality and greater representation of women in key roles.

== History ==
On June 8, 2018, the ReFrame Stamp program was launched to promote and recognize gender-balanced productions in film and television based on data from IMDbPro on how many women are involved in a production in front of and behind the camera. On September 26, the Stamp program expanded to include submissions for TV shows and movies from cable and streaming platforms. ReFrame entered into a partnership in February 2020 with Delta Air Lines in which two in-flight channels dedicated to films and television programs respectively with the ReFrame Stamp would be featured. The ReFrame Movie Channel launched with 29 initial offerings including Wonder Woman, The Hate U Give, Ocean's 8, and Lady Bird. The ReFrame Show Channel's initial releases included Supergirl, Empire, How to Get Away With Murder, and Better Things. These offerings were planned to cycle on a monthly basis with additions in each lineup.

== Submission process ==
Qualifying films must be distributed either theatrically or via streaming, while TV shows are counted in relation to the calendar for the Emmy Awards. Films and television which are not considered top 100 grossing projects may be considered through a rolling open call via a manual submission process.

During any given submission period, the individual entering the information regarding the feature film which has been distributed theatrically or via streaming must utilize the Narrative Feature, Animated Feature, or Television submission form. As of 2019, information provided in each submission must include the project title, year of release, studio (or platform), distributor, and contact information for both a production and studio/distributor representative. The submission must specify the positions of each woman involved in qualifying areas for consideration, as well as whether each of those specified is a person of color. Appeals for ReFrame Stamp submissions are reviewed using an independent panel and may be submitted via email.

== Criteria ==
Based on a points system, narrative films and animated films and TV programs must achieve four points within the eight defined qualifying categories with at least two points in the categories of female director, writer, and lead. Double points are awarded for women of color in important positions. Screen time analysis is done with the Geena Davis Inclusion Quotient (GD-IQ), while points are calculated by an algorithm and given to the films or TV programs that meet the requirements. After the stamp is awarded, a logo is added to the end credits. The criteria are subject to change accordingly with the evolving industry.

=== Film ===
- Female lead (Top 1 slot listed on the call sheet)
  - 1 point for a female lead
  - 2 points for a female lead of color
- Female co-lead (Top 2-5 slots on the call sheet)
  - 1 point for a female lead
  - 2 points for a female lead of color
- Female representation on screen
  - 1 point when 50% of the screen time is female
  - 2 points when 25% of the screen time is females of color
- Female director
  - 1 point for a female director
  - 2 points for a female director of color
- Female writer
  - 1 point for a credited female writer
  - 2 points for a credited female writer of color
- Female producer
  - 1 point for a female producer
  - 2 points for a female producer of color
- 50% of department heads are female
  - 1 point for 50% female department heads
  - 2 points for 25% female department heads of color
- 50% of crew members
  - 1 point for 50% female crew
  - 2 points for 25% female crew of color

=== Television ===
- Female lead (Top 1 slot listed on the call sheet)
  - 1 point for a female lead
  - 2 points for a female lead of color
- Female season regulars (Top 2-5 slots on the call sheet)
  - 1 point if 50% of season regulars are female
  - 2 points if 25% of season regulars are females of color
- Female showrunner
  - 1 point for a female showrunner
  - 2 points for a female showrunner of color
- Female writing staff
  - 1 point if 50% of writing staff are female writers (per season)
  - 2 points if 25% of writing staff are female writers of color (per season)
- Female producer
  - 1 point for at least one female non-writing producer
  - 2 points for at least one female non-writing producer of color
- Female director
  - 1 point for 50% of episodes directed by female directors (per season)
  - 2 points for 25% of episodes directed by female directors of color (per season)
- Designated female production personnel
  - 1 point if 50% of the designated production personnel are female
  - 2 points if 25% of the designated production personnel are female of color
- Female crew
  - 1 point for 50% female crew
  - 2 points for 25% female crew of color

== Winners and nominees ==
=== Film ===
==== 2017 Narrative and Animated Feature Recipients ====
Announced June 7 and August 28, 2018

Distributor	Film
Amazon Prime	Armstrong
Warner Bros. Entertainment	Everything, Everything; Wonder Woman
Universal Pictures	Girls Trip; Pitch Perfect 3
Open Road Films	Home Again
Aviron Pictures	Kidnap
A24	Lady Bird; Share
Lionsgate	My Little Pony: The Movie
20th Century Fox	The Post; Snatched
Fox Searchlight Pictures	The Shape of Water; Can You Ever Forgive Me?
Columbia Pictures	Smurfs: The Lost Village
Frameline	Suicide Kale
Sony Pictures Classics	Capernaum; The Wife
Annapurna Pictures	Destroyer
CBS Films	Five Feet Apart
Juice Worldwide	Freelancers Anonymous
Neon	Gemini
	IRL
Excel Entertainment Group	Jane and Emma
Netflix	Juanita; Otherhood; The Polka King
Amazon Studios	Late Night
Blumhouse Productions	The Lie
Universal Pictures Home Entertainment	The Long Dumb Road
IFC Films	Mary Shelley
	Miss Arizona

==== 2018 Feature Recipients ====
Announced March 6, 2019

Distributor	Film
Lionsgate	A Simple Favor; Acrimony; The Spy Who Dumped Me
iTunes	At Your Own Risk
Walt Disney Studios	A Wrinkle in Time; The Nutcracker and the Four Realms
Universal Pictures	Blockers; Breaking In; Truth or Dare
Paramount Pictures	Book Club; Bumblebee; Nobody's Fool
Netflix	Duck Butter; I Am Not an Easy Man
Warner Bros. Entertainment	Crazy Rich Asians; Life of the Party; Ocean's 8
Fox Searchlight Pictures	The Favourite
20th Century Fox	The Hate U Give; Widows
CBS Films; Lionsgate	Hell Fest
Showtime	Mail Order Monster
Focus Features	Mary Queen of Scots; On the Basis of Sex
Samuel Goldwyn Films	Nancy
Screen Gems	Proud Mary
STX Entertainment	Second Act
Roadside Attractions	Viper Club

==== 2019 Top 100-Grossing Narrative Feature Recipients ====
Announced February 26, 2020

Distributor	Film
Sony Pictures Releasing	A Dog's Way Home; Black and Blue; Escape Room; Little Women
Universal Pictures	Abominable; Cats; Last Christmas; Little; Ma; Queen & Slim; Us
20th Century Fox	Alita: Battle Angel; Breakthrough
United Artists Releasing	Booksmart; The Hustle
Walt Disney Motion Pictures	Captain Marvel; Frozen 2
Paramount Pictures	Dora and the Lost City of Gold; What Men Want
CBS Films/Lionsgate	Five Feet Apart
Focus Features	Harriet
STX Entertainment	Hustlers; UglyDolls
Warner Bros. Pictures	Isn't It Romantic; The Curse of La Llorona
Lionsgate	Long Shot

==== 2020 Top 100-Grossing Narrative Feature Recipients ====
Announced February 17, 2021

Distributor	Film
Disney+	Godmothered
FilmRise	The Short History of the Long Road
Focus Features	Kajillionaire; The High Note
HBO Max	Let Them All Talk; There Is No "I" in Threesome
Hulu/Sony Pictures Releasing	Happiest Season
IFC Films	Olympic Dreams; Premature; Relic; The Other Lamb
Indie Rights	Mnemophrenia
Level Forward	I'll Meet You There
Lionsgate	Antebellum; Rogue; Wander Darkly
Neon	Shirley
Netflix/Paramount Pictures	The Lovebirds
Netflix	A Babysitter's Guide to Monster Hunting; A California Christmas; All The Bright Places; Cuties; Dangerous Lies; Desperados; Hillbilly Elegy; Holidate; Horse Girl; Love, Guaranteed; Lost Girls; Ma Rainey's Black Bottom; Over the Moon; Rebecca; The Half of It; The Last Thing He Wanted; The Old Guard; The Princess Switch: Switched Again; The Sleepover; To All the Boys: P.S. I Still Love You
Open Road Films/Voltage Pictures	After We Collided
Paramount Pictures	The Rhythm Section
Samuel Goldwyn Films	The Marijuana Conspiracy
Sony Pictures Releasing	The Broken Hearts Gallery; I Carry You With Me
United Artists Releasing	Valley Girl
Universal Pictures	Trolls World Tour
Utopia/Pacific Northwest Pictures	Shiva Baby
Vertical Entertainment	Inheritance
Walt Disney Studios	Mulan
Warner Brothers Pictures	Birds of Prey; Wonder Woman 1984

=== Television ===
==== 2017–2018 Television Recipients ====
Announced November 13, 2018

Distributor	Show and Season	Film
ABC	Agents of S.H.I.E.L.D. season 5; For the People season 1; Grey's Anatomy season 14; How to Get Away with Murder season 4; Scandal season 7; Station 19 season 1	
Amazon Prime Video	Dino Dana season 1; Just Add Magic (season 2B); The Marvelous Mrs. Maisel season 1; Transparent season 4	An American Girl Story: Summer Camp, Friends for Life
TNT	Animal Kingdom season 2; Claws season 1	
FX	Better Things season 2	
Comedy Central	Broad City season 4	
PBS	Call the Midwife season 7	
NBC	Chicago Med season 3; This Is Us season 2	
The CW	Crazy Ex-Girlfriend season 3; Jane the Virgin season 4; Supergirl season 3	
Netflix	Dear White People season 2; GLOW season 1; Grace and Frankie season 4; Jessica Jones season 2; Love season 3; One Day at a Time season 2; Orange Is the New Black season 5; Seven Seconds season 1	
Fox	Empire season 4	
Lifetime		Faith Under Fire: The Antoinette Tuff Story; Flint; Harry & Meghan: A Royal Romance; I Am Elizabeth Smart; Story of a Girl; The Simone Biles Story: Courage to Soar
YouTube Premium	Foursome season 3; Lace Up: The Ultimate Sneaker Challenge season 1; Step Up: High Water season 1; Youth & Consequences season 1	
Starz	Howards End; Outlander season 3; Sweetbitter season 1; The Girlfriend Experience: Bria season 2; Vida season 1	
TruTV	I'm Sorry season 1	
HBO	Insecure season 2	
BBC America	Killing Eve season 1	
PBS Masterpiece	Little Women	
OWN	Queen Sugar season 2	
Freeform	Famous in Love season 2; The Bold Type season 1	
TV Land	Teachers (season 2B)	
Showtime	SMILF season 1; The Chi season 1	
CBS	Madam Secretary season 4	
CBS All Access	The Good Fight season 2	
Hulu	The Handmaid's Tale season 2; The Mindy Project season 6	
TBS	Search Party season 2; The Detour season 3; The Last O.G. season 1	

==== 2017–2018 Top 100 Most Popular Television Recipients ====
Announced January 14, 2020

Distributor	Show and Season
ABC	For the People season 1; Grey's Anatomy season 14; How to Get Away with Murder season 4; Once Upon a Time season 7; Scandal season 7; Station 19 season 1; The Middle season 9
AMC	Humans season 3
BBC America	Killing Eve season 1
CBS	Madam Secretary season 4
The CW	iZombie season 4; Jane the Virgin season 4; Supergirl season 3; The 100 season 5
Freeform	Pretty Little Liars season 7
FX	The Americans season 5; American Horror Story season 7
Hulu	The Handmaid's Tale season 2
Netflix	GLOW season 1; Jessica Jones season 2; Orange Is the New Black season 5
Showcase	Picnic at Hanging Rock season 1

==== 2018–2019 Top 100 Most Popular Television Recipients ====
Announced January 14, 2020

Distributor	Show and Season
Amazon Prime Video	Fleabag season 2; The Marvelous Mrs. Maisel season 2
ABC	Grey's Anatomy season 15; How to Get Away with Murder season 5
AMC	The Walking Dead season 9
BBC	Killing Eve season 2
CBC Television	Workin' Moms season 3
CBS All Access	Star Trek: Discovery season 2
The CW	Jane the Virgin season 5; Supergirl season 4; The 100 season 6
Fox Broadcasting Company	9-1-1 season 2
FX	American Horror Story season 8; Pose season 1
Hulu	The Act season 1; The Handmaid's Tale season 3
Netflix	BoJack Horseman season 5; GLOW season 2; Orange Is the New Black season 6; When They See Us
STARZ	Power season 5

==== 2019–2020 Top 100 Most Popular Television Recipients ====
Announced September 15, 2020

Distributor	Show and Season
ABC	Grey's Anatomy season 16
Amazon	The Marvelous Mrs. Maisel season 3; Modern Love
AMC	The Walking Dead season 10
Apple TV+	The Morning Show season 1
BBC America	Killing Eve season 3
CBS All Access	Star Trek: Picard season 1
The CW	The 100 season 6
FX	American Horror Story season 9
HBO	Big Little Lies season 2; Euphoria season 1; Watchmen season 1; Westworld season 3
HBO Max	Batwoman season 1
Hulu	The Great season 1; The Handmaid's Tale season 3; Little Fires Everywhere (miniseries); Normal People (miniseries)
Netflix	Altered Carbon season 2; Dead to Me season 2; The End of the F***ing World season 2; GLOW season 3; I Am Not Okay with This season 1; The I-Land season 1; Jessica Jones season 3; Never Have I Ever season 1; Orange Is the New Black season 7; Sex Education season 2; Sweet Magnolias season 1; 13 Reasons Why season 3; Unbelievable (miniseries); Unorthodox (miniseries); You season 2

==== 2020–21 Top 200 Most Popular Television Recipients ====
Announced on July 20, 2021

Distributor	Show and Season	Film
ABC	A Million Little Things season 3; Big Sky season 1; Grey's Anatomy season 17; Rebel season 1; Station 19 season 4; The Good Doctor season 4; The Rookie season 3	
Amazon	Them season 1; The Wilds season 1; Tell Me Your Secrets season 1	
AMC	Kevin Can F**k Himself season 1; NOS4A2 season 2; The Walking Dead: World Beyond season 2	
Apple TV+	Dickinson season 2; Mythic Quest season 1; Servant season 2; The Mosquito Coast season 1	
CBS	Clarice season 1; MacGyver season 5; Mom season 8; NCIS: New Orleans season 7; The Equalizer season 1; Young Sheldon season 4	
CBS All Access	Star Trek: Discovery season 3; Star Trek: Lower Decks season 1; The Twilight Zone season 2	
The CW	Batwoman season 2; Legends of Tomorrow season 6; Kung Fu season 1; Supergirl season 6	
Disney+	The Mighty Ducks: Game Changers season 1; WandaVision season 1	
Disney Channel		Spin
Fox	9-1-1 season 4; 9-1-1: Lone Star season 2; Call Me Kat season 1	
Freeform	Cruel Summer season 1; Everything's Gonna Be Okay season 1; Good Trouble season 3; Motherland: Fort Salem season 2; Love in the Time of Corona (miniseries)	
FX	Black Narcissus (miniseries); Pose season 4	
HBO	His Dark Materials season 2; I May Destroy You season 1; Industry season 1; Lovecraft Country season 1; The Undoing (miniseries)	
HBO Max	Love Life season 1; Made for Love season 1; Search Party season 1; The Flight Attendant season 1; The Nevers season 1	
Hulu	A Teacher (miniseries); Love, Victor season 1; Monsterland season 1; PEN15 (season 2A); The Handmaid's Tale season 4; Y: The Last Man season 1	
Lifetime		Gone Mom: The Disappearance of Jennifer Dulos
NBC	Blindspot season 5; Good Girls season 4; Law & Order: Organized Crime season 1; Law & Order: Special Victims Unit season 22; Manifest season 3; Superstore season 6; Young Rock season 1; Zoey's Extraordinary Playlist season 2	
Netflix	Ada Twist, Scientist season 1; Away season 1; Behind Her Eyes (miniseries); Bridgerton season 1; The Chilling Adventures of Sabrina (season 2, part 4); Dota: Dragon's Blood season 1; Fate: The Winx Saga season 1; Firefly Lane season 1; Ginny & Georgia season 1; Grand Army season 1; Ridley Jones season 1; Stateless (miniseries); Teenage Bounty Hunters season 1; The Baby-Sitters Club season 1; The Order season 2; The Haunting of Bly Manor; The Politician season 2; Tiny Pretty Things season 1; Virgin River season 2; Warrior Nun season 1; We the People season 1	
PBS Masterpiece	Flesh and Blood (miniseries); Miss Scarlet and The Duke season 1	
Peacock	Girls5Eva season 1; Punky Brewster season 1; Rutherford Falls season 1; Saved by the Bell season 1	
Quibi	Don't Look Deeper season 1	
Showtime	City on a Hill season 2; The Chi season 3	
Spectrum Originals/Fox	L.A.'s Finest season 2	
Starz	P-Valley season 1; Power Book II: Ghost season 1; The Girlfriend Experience season 2; The Luminaries (miniseries); The Spanish Princess season 2	
Syfy	Wynonna Earp season 4	
TNT	Snowpiercer season 2	
TBS	Chad season 1	
USA Network	Dirty John: Betty (The Betty Broderick Story) season 2; Queen of the South season 5	

== See also ==
- Bechdel test
