= Day 101 =

- Scandal episode
- Episode no.: Season 7 Episode 3
- Directed by: Scott Foley
- Written by: Zahir McGhee
- Cinematography by: Daryn Okada
- Editing by: Christal A. Khatib
- Original air date: October 19, 2017
- Running time: 43:03

Guest appearances
- Jay Hernandez as Curtis Pryce; Myk Watford as Secret Service agent; Jay Jackson as Mike Waters; Elizabeth Grullon as Lora

Episode chronology
← Previous "Pressing the Flesh"	Next → "Lost Girls"
- Scandal (season 7)

"Day 101" is the third episode of the seventh season of ABC's political drama series Scandal. Directed by Scott Foley and written by Zahir McGhee, it premiered in the U.S. on October 19, 2017. The episode was watched by 4.70 million Americans, and received mixed commentary from television criticism.

== Plot ==
This episode depicts the 100-day period that followed Mellie's entrance in the White House as president.

Fitz moves to Vermont and begins a candid, careless, and mundane life plan. During the first few days, Fitz does things a regular citizen does during their life, such as cooking and shopping with a credit card; however, he gets bored and summons Marcus Walker to work at the municipal library that will carry his name and legacy. Walker, in Cuba, is shown in expensive hotels accompanied by women and alcohol, until he realizes that he needs to return to active duty and heed the former president's request. The two discuss Olivia's involvement in the library, since the people love her. Walker goes so far as to say that Olivia presided over Fitz, but he refuses to accept that his political achievements were reduced to a woman. Meanwhile, a young black man spends several hours sleeping near a colonel's statue and manages to direct the media's attention to himself. His goal is to make politicians recognize that the man honored via the statue is a racist and does not deserve recognition. Walker suggests that Fitz get involved, but Fitz refuses and the two focus on raising capital for the future library. During a dinner with an important businessman who can potentially help them, Walker becomes annoyed with Fitz and the two have a sudden argument, which later turns into a violent fight because of their disagreements.

At the White House, Mellie is seen working when she gets a call from an appalled Marcus. He explains the situation with Fitz to her, and Mellie says that Fitz's relationship with anyone is complicated and exhausting, requiring patience and dedication. Walker expresses his pride by Mellie's acting position and they bid farewell after a long, embarrassing and painful silence.

Fitz receives a visit from Rowan Pope, who warns him that Olivia is now the Commander of the B613. Pope asks Fitz for help, explaining that only he can clear Olivia's mind and remove her from the ambition of power. Then Fitz claims that he now lives a conventional life, thus making it impossible for him to get next to Olivia again. Rowan leaves and hours later Walker drives back to the Grant mansion and finds Fitz in the front porch. They apologize for everything they said to each other, and Fitz recognizes that he has to do something meaningful in his life and states that he needs to return to Washington after the 100-day period. The next day, Fitz goes to the place where the young man protests. He encourages him to continue his battle, gives him gloves to resist the cold, and even takes a selfie with him to the Instagram. The photo gains repercussion and soon the authorities have the statue removed.

On the night of day 101, Fitz heads to Olivia's apartment and rings the bell. Nobody answers, but the elevator soon opens and Fitz sees Olivia kissing Curtis Pryce, scene shown at the end of the previous episode.

== Reception ==
=== Reviews ===
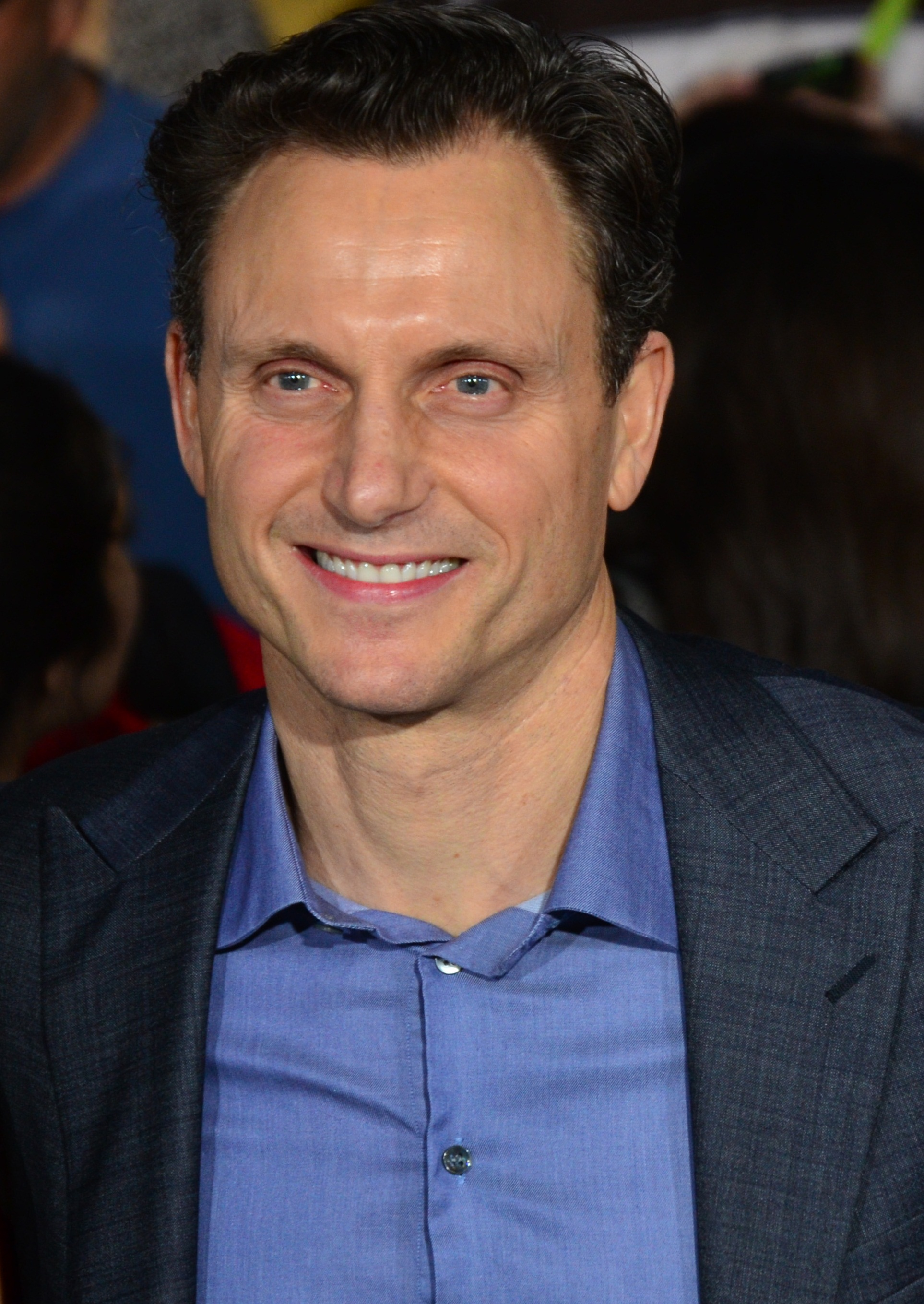
The attitude of Tony Goldwyn's character in this episode received mixed to negative response from critics.

"Day 101" received lukewarm response due to its slow pacing and the lack of story progression. Joshua Alston, writing for New York magazine's blog Vulture, commented that the episode was one of the series' most boring, stating that it is "an easy episode to forget because it does nothing to push the story forward. In fact, it goes backward, jumping back to the first moments of Fitz’s lonely, disorienting post-presidency phase." He gave it a two stars rating out of five. Paul Dailly of TV Fanatic also had a similar view, giving a 2.5 stars rating out of five, and fertilizing that "it's time [for the show] to crank up the pace and give viewers some good storytelling." He further added, "'Day 101' was not Scandal at its finest. It was slow and littered with too much exposition."

Kendall Williams of Den of Geek had a mixed response, giving the installment a three stars rating out of five. Andrea Reiher of Refinery29 praised Fitz's story line and its depicting. Similarly, Lauren Busser of Tell-Tale TV stated that although she's not a fan of Fitz, she had to congratulate the character's development and his interactions with other characters. She gave the episode a 4.2 stars rating out of 5.

Entertainment Weekly's Justin Kirkland wrote a positive review for the episode, affirming that "[the show is] heading in the right direction." SpoilerTV praised the episode's approach of racism and sexism, comparing it with previous installments such as "Dog-Whistle Politics".

=== Ratings ===
"Day 101" premiered on October 19, 2017. It was watched by 4.70 million viewers, the first episode of Scandal to dip below 5 million viewers, and acquired a 1.1/4 rating/share among those aged 18–49, according to Nielsen Media Research. On DVR, it was watched by 2.55 millions and garnered a 1.0 rating, thus increasing the total viewership to 7.25 millions.
