= Transfer of Power (Scandal) =

- Scandal episode
- Episode no.: Season 6 Episode 16
- Directed by: Tony Goldwyn
- Written by: Matt Byrne; Mark Fish
- Production code: 616
- Original air date: May 18, 2017
- Running time: 43:03

Guest appearances
- George Newbern as Charlie; Tessie Santiago as Luna Vargas; Khandi Alexander as Maya Lewis

Episode chronology
← Previous "Tick Tock"	Next → "Watch Me"
- Scandal (season 6)

"Transfer of Power" is the sixteenth episode and the season finale of the sixth season of ABC's political thriller series Scandal, which premiered alongside the previous episode in the United States on May 18, 2017. The 106th episode overall of the series, it was directed by Tony Goldwyn and written by Matt Byrne and Mark Fish. The installment received mixed reviews from television criticism and was watched by 5.23 million Americans.

== Plot ==
Picking up immediately after the events of the previous episode, Fitz and Olivia discuss the latter's decision to free her mother from custody. Despite being initially angry at each other, they have sex to celebrate Fitz's last day in office. The following morning, Maya manages to distract NSA agents and to remove the tracker which was implanted in her neck, thus narrowing further actions from Olivia and Jake. Mellie decides not to cancel the oath ceremony, to put Jake as chief of operations and to duplicate the protection of her and Luna's children. Fitz and Rowan get ready to restart B613 and put Fitz in charge.

At the ceremony, everything goes perfectly well, though Olivia received a call from her mother, who was at the top of a building ready to shoot someone who was not Mellie. When Maya was about to tell Olivia who had contacted her, Rowan knocked her out. Meanwhile, at OPA, Huck discovers one of the high-ranking people that hired Maya to kill Mellie. Since everything went well, President Mellie continues with the ceremony and the parade. Afterwards, Olivia argues with Fitz about him ordering Rowan to overthrow Maya. Mellie, enraged by the argument, leaves the room to choose her dress. Fitz's assistant calls him, saying that David is on the phone, wanting to talk to him. Fitz leaves, leaving Olivia alone and willing to argue.

Quinn asks Abby to take over OPA, saying that her baby needs a normal place to grow and live. Olivia goes to David's office and threatens him to tell her about what he and Fitz were talking about earlier. Soon after, Olivia is shown in the White House; she reveals to Fitz that she has already discovered about the reconstitution of B613. She asks him what made him decide to collaborate on Rowan's plan, and Fitz reveals that he will be the Command. Olivia is shocked, but still convinces him to give up the plan. They say goodbye since Fitz is leaving to Vermont to run his organization. He leaves and, shortly after, Olivia shows up in the backyard. They kiss in front of a crowd of photographers. Fitz gets on the Marine One helicopter, leaving a sad Olivia behind.

Back at OPA, Olivia, Quinn, Huck and Charlie investigate on who was the high-ranking VIP who ordered Mellie's assassination. Olivia soon realizes that Luna Vargas is the one who was behind everything that happened to Francisco, to Mellie and to Cyrus. She runs to confront Luna, but the latter assumes that Olivia can't send her to jail since she's the Vice President and this could ruin Mellie's presidency. At the hospital, Olivia visits her mother, who convinces her not to let anyone stand between Olivia and the White House. The conversation between mother and daughter leaves Olivia eager to act.

At night, Abby persuades Quinn to stay in Washington and run OPA, saying that she will help in every way to take care of the unborn child. Quinn cries as Charlie enters the room. She tells him that she's pregnant and they hug, as Huck blankly watches them. At the Oval, Mellie has an emotive moment in the renovated office and, following, goes to Cyrus's to invite him to go to the ball as her date. Olivia finishes her preparation to the ball and Jake knocks her door. She opens it to tell him that she knows how to handle Luna’s situation. The two invite Luna to a private room and Olivia tells her that she's going to die right there. Luna calls her agents, but Jake reveals that the agents are his, and that they're not going to do anything. Olivia presents her two forms of dying: committing suicide and being recognized as a saint, or being murdered and thrown somewhere by Jake and being investigated and then called a murderer for having ordered Francisco's death. Luna complains that she did not kill Francisco. She explains that she paid someone to make him lose since she did not want to be First Lady, but they ended up killing him. However, Olivia argues that it is a lie since Luna asked not to put her children onstage the night of the death of Frankie, since she already knew that something bad would happen. Luna takes the deadly pills after Olivia agrees that she isn't pure evil.

Afterwards, Olivia asks Mellie to sign a paper while Cyrus silently observes. Unbeknownst to Mellie, she was signing the papers to fund a new B613, which Olivia is commanding. Olivia goes to her father's paleontology lab to tell him she's the new Command. She tells him that she loves him and that she wants Sunday dinners. Olivia repeats Rowan's words from before: family is a weakness. Rowan explains that Olivia is not a smart prey, she has always been the predator. Olivia and Cyrus meet on the staircase of the Lincoln Memorial. Olivia discovers that Cyrus persuaded Luna to take control after he repeated exactly the same sentences Luna said while explaining herself earlier. Cyrus, on the other hand, succeeds to understand that Olivia took over B613.

== Production ==
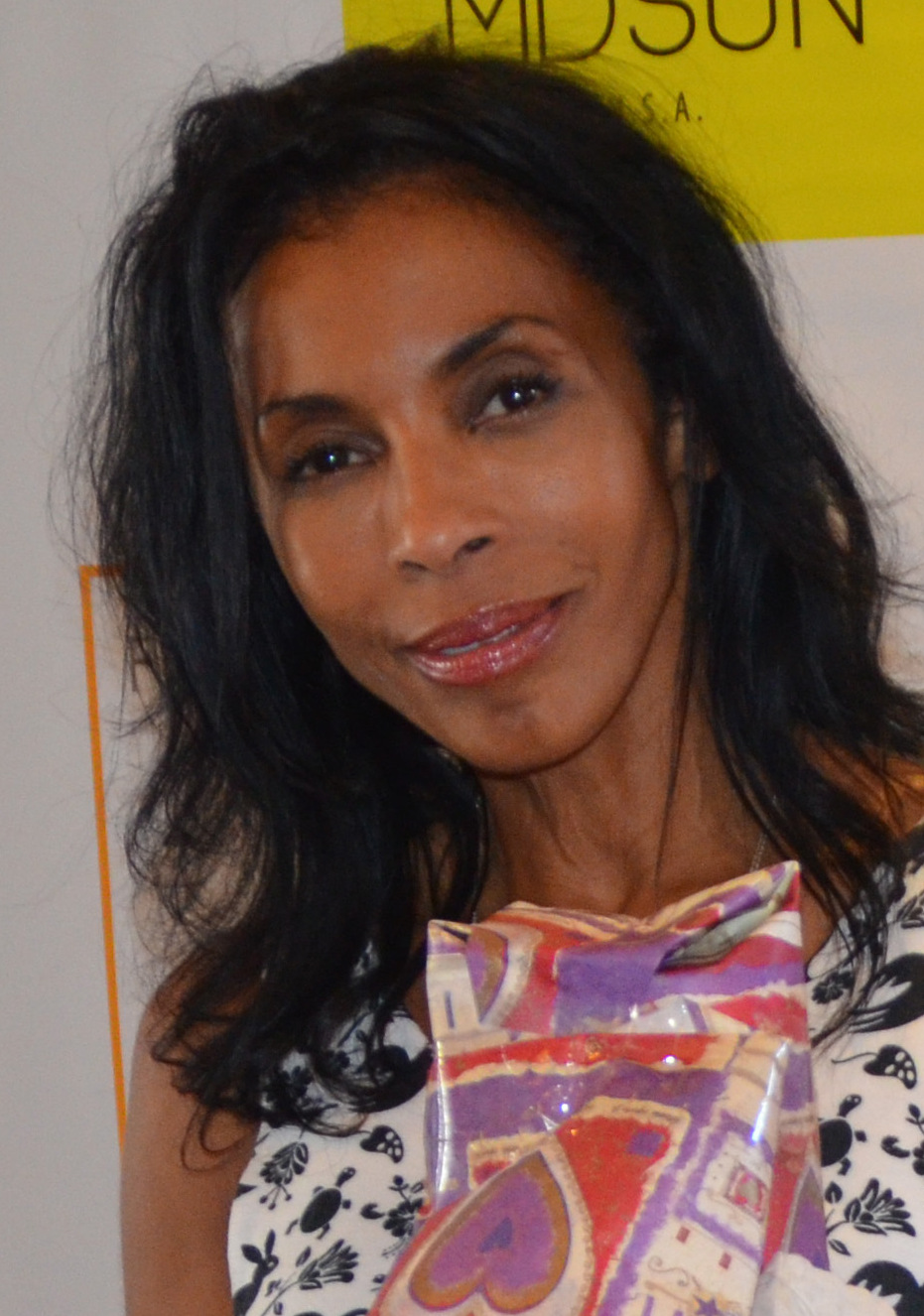
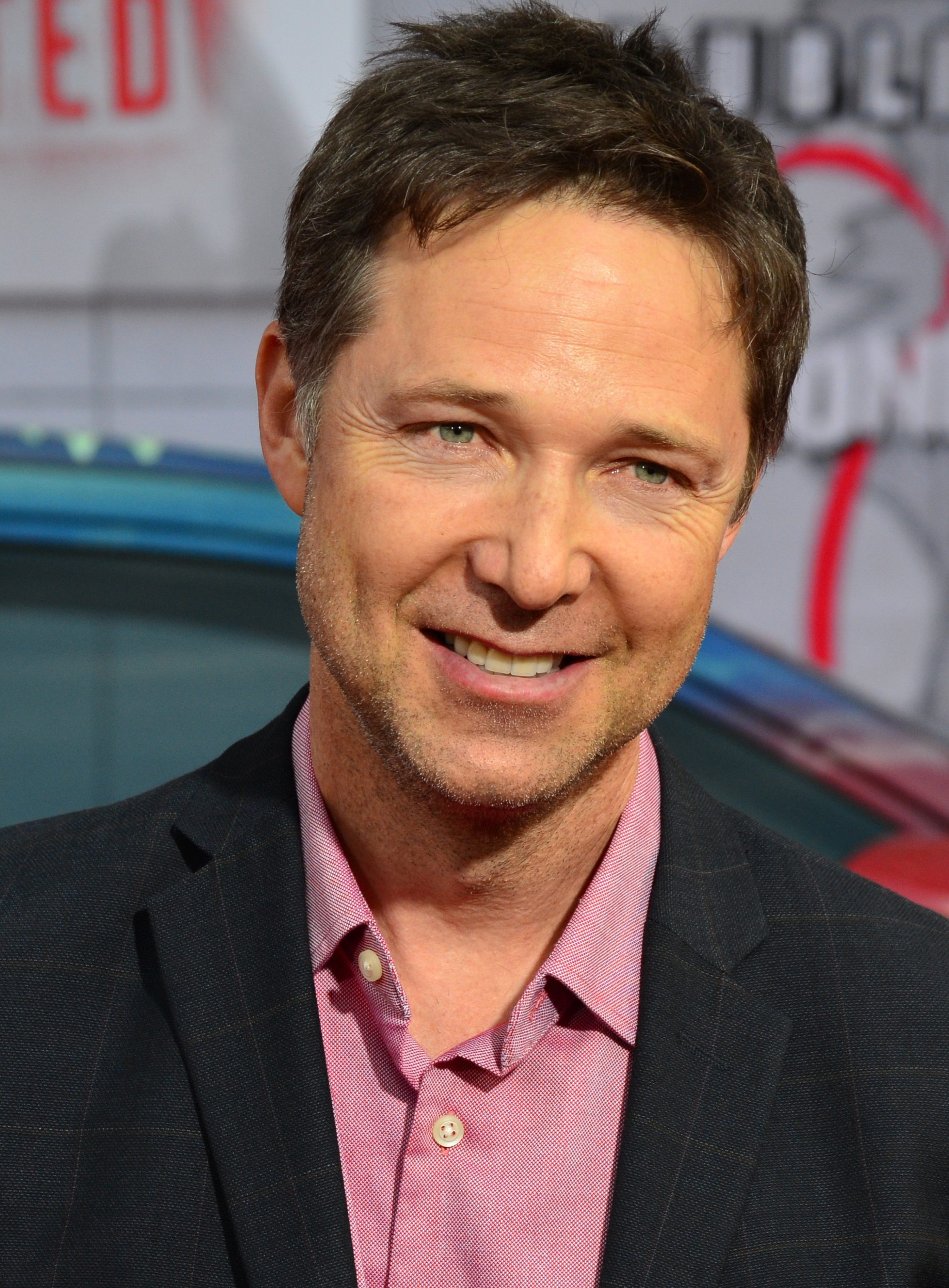
Khandi Alexander (left) and George Newbern (right) guest star in this episode.

"Transfer or Power" was directed by executive producer Tony Goldwyn and written by Matt Byrne and Mark Fish. The table read for the season finale occurred on April 13, 2017, as revealed by Kerry Washington. Filming for the episode ended on April 29, 2017. The episode focuses on Mellie's oath and Fitz's departure from the White House, as well as showing a dark side of Olivia. George Newbern, Tessie Santiago and Khandi Alexander has had guest appearances. The episode features the songs "Hail to the Chief" by United States Marine Band, "The Light" by The Album Leaf, and a cover version by Aretha Franklin of "It's My Turn". Score for the episode was developed by Paul Koch, who works on it since the show's inception.

== Reception ==
"Transfer of Power" premiered on May 18, 2017, on American Broadcasting Company (ABC) in the United States, along with the previous episode, "Tick Tock", comprising into a two-hour finale event. The double event was watched by 5.23 million Americans during its original run and acquired a 1.2/5 rating/share among the adults aged 18–49.

Entertainment Weekly writer Justin Kirkland gave the season finale a mixed review, saying the episode "has taken so many twists and turns that it’s somehow gone further from its origin while also seeming to tap into its roots more than ever before." Lindsey McGhee from Den of Geek gave the episode a 3.5 out of 5 stars rating. Ashley Ray-Harris of The A.V. Club rated the episode with a C+ grade, calling it "successful" since it "presents a tangible ending for [the show's] last season." Paul Dailly of TV Fanatic gave the season finale a 5 out of 5 stars rating. Lauren Busser of Tell-Tale TV gave the episode a 4.2 out of 5 stars rating.
