= Heavy Is the Head (Scandal) =

- Scandal episode
- Fitz (Tony Goldwyn) asking Mellie (Bellamy Young) for a divorce.
- Episode no.: Season 5 Episode 1
- Directed by: Tom Verica
- Written by: Shonda Rhimes
- Original air date: September 24, 2015

Guest appearances
- Kate Burton as Sally Langston; Dearbhla Molloy as Queen Isabel; Adam Fergus as Prince Richard; Hilty Bowen as Princess Emily; Jay Jackson as Mike Waters

Episode chronology
← Previous "You Can't Take Command"	Next → "Yes"
- Scandal (season 5)

"Heavy Is the Head" is the season premiere of the fifth season of the American political thriller television series Scandal, and the 70th episode overall. It aired on September 24, 2015, on American Broadcasting Company (ABC) in the United States. The episode was written by showrunner Shonda Rhimes and directed by executive producer Tom Verica. The episode focuses on the newly mended relationship with Olivia and Fitz, in addition to the scandal in which the Princess of Caledonia is killed and Olivia is hired to make sure the royal family's private life stays private.

== Plot ==
Olivia and Fitz are back together again and enjoying every scandalous moment together while Cyrus, Mellie and Huck are all still dealing with the aftermath of helping Command. Meanwhile, when a visit from the Queen of Caldonia and her family turns into a tragedy, Olivia is hired to make sure the royal family's private life stays private.

== Production ==
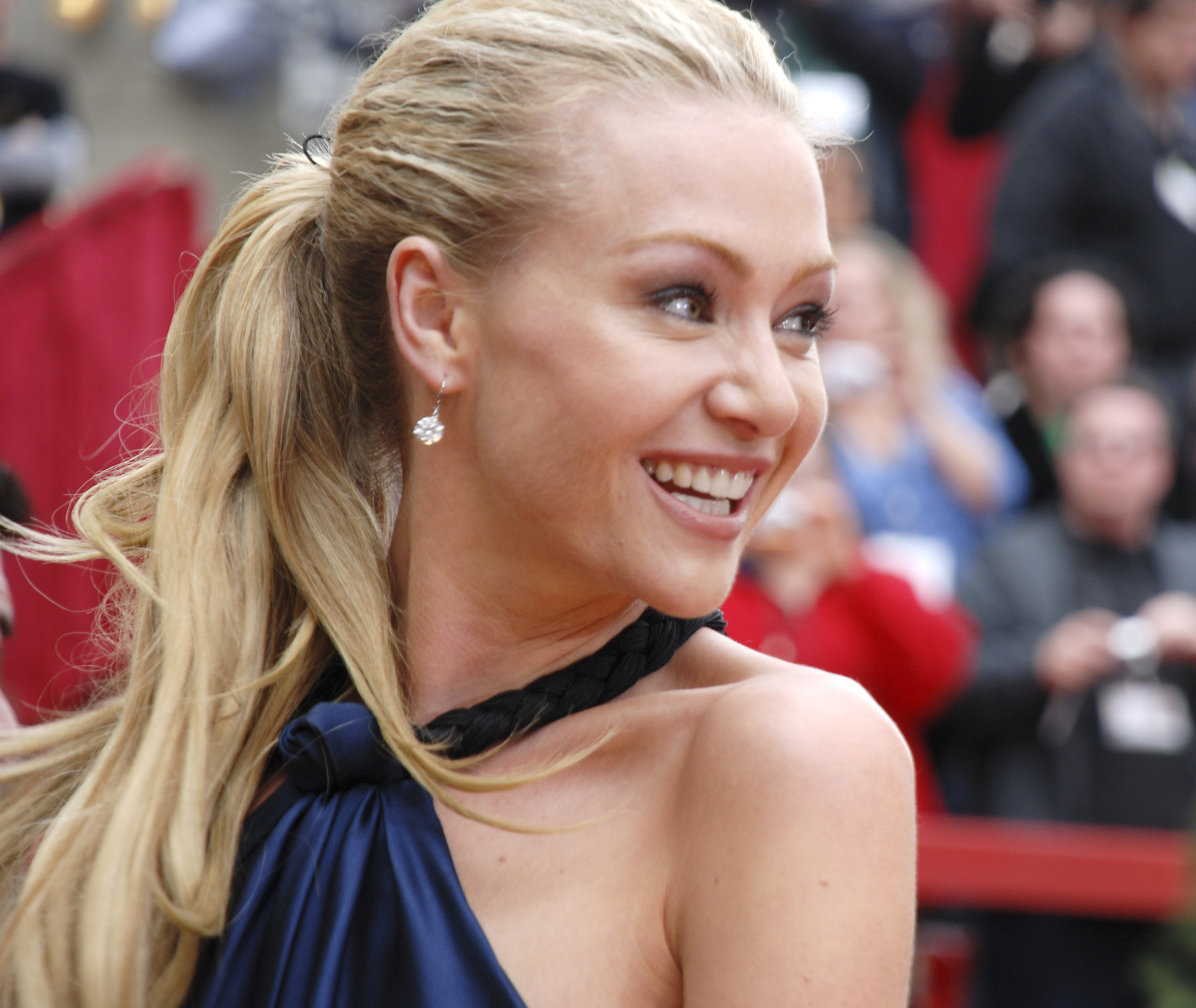
Portia de Rossi was upgraded to a series regular, starting with this episode.

The episode was written by showrunner Shonda Rhimes and directed by executive producer Tom Verica. The episode featured the songs "You Got the Love" by the funk band Rufus featuring Chaka Khan and "We the People" by The Staple Singers. The episode focuses on Olivia and Fitz getting used to being together, Fitz's struggle to divorce Mellie and the scandal in which the princess of Caledonia is killed leading Olivia to handle and trying to figure out the case.

After the fourth-season finale, it was announced that Portia de Rossi had been promoted to a series regular for the fifth season after being a recurring role in the previous season. Kate Burton reprised her role as Sally Langston, now the host of the television show "The Liberty Report" as she reveals Olivia and Fitz's relationship on national television. Dearbhla Molloy, Adam Fergus and Hilty Bowen guest starred in the episode, playing Queen Isabel, Prince Richard and Princess Emily of the royal family of Caledonia, respectively. Production for the premiere began on May 21, 2015, when Rhimes announced on Twitter that the writers were in full swing mapping the fifth season. The table read for the first episode was on July 14, 2015, as it was announced by Kerry Washington. The title of the season premiere was revealed on August 8, 2015, by its director Tom Verica on Twitter. Filming of the episode began on July 16, 2015.

For the season premiere, ABC promoted the fifth season with several commercials featuring almost every principal cast member from the three Shondaland produced shows, Grey's Anatomy, Scandal, and How to Get Away with Murder since they were a part of ABC's Thursday primetime lineup, named "Thank God It's Thursday" (TGIT). Another promo featuring scenes with Olivia and Fitz was released on September 10, 2015, and featured the cover of the song "At Last" sung by Etta James, which was later used as the slogan for the fifth season.

== Reception ==
=== Broadcasting ===
"Heavy Is the Head" was originally broadcast on Thursday, September 24, 2015, in the United States on ABC. The episode's total viewership was 10.25 million, way up with over 2.1 million viewers from the fourth-season finale, but down from the fourth-season premiere "Randy, Red, Superfreak and Julia". In the key 18-49 demographic, the episode scored a 3.3/10 in Nielsen ratings, the highest rating since the episode "No More Blood". It was the top TV show in the 9:00 p.m. with only a repeating of Arrow airing in the timeslot.

The 10.25 million people tuned into the episode marked a 27 percent viewership increase from the previous episode (8.08 million), in addition to the installment's 3.3 Nielsen rating in the target 18–49 demographic marked a 43 percent increase from 2.2 from the previous episode. The Nielsen score additionally registered the show as the week's second-highest rated drama and third-highest rated scripted series in the 18–49 demographic, only behind Fox's Empire (6.7) and CBS's The Big Bang Theory (4.7). Seven days of time-shifted viewing added on an additional 1.8 rating points in the 18–49 demographic and 4.49 million viewers, bringing the total viewership for the episode to 14.73 million viewers with a 5.1 Nielsen rating in the 18–49 demographic.

=== Critical reception ===
The episode was well received by television critics, with many praising the premiere and calling it an improvement over the previous season. Cory Barker from TV.com praised the newly fixed relationship between Olivia and Fitz as he said "the Season 5 premiere, "Heavy Is The Head," did some of the show's best work in convincing me that the version of Scandal I like can still potentially exist while much of the screen time is dedicated to Olivia and Fitz as a legitimate couple." Cicely K. Dyson from The Wall Street Journal commented on Olivia's decision that she and Fitz had to work through their problems first before going public, with her calling it "The most adult decision they’ve ever made."

Writing for Entertainment Weekly, Isabella Biedenharn commented positive on the premiere's opening as she said "Is this how every episode is going to start and finish all season? Because I have to admit… I don’t hate it. She may be crazy, but she’s a compelling narrator if I’ve ever seen one." She was more negative towards Olivia and Fitz's relationship because of the development of the Fitz character and his speech to Mellie after wanting a divorce.
