= Scandal season 6 =

Season of American television series Scandal

Scandal
- Season 6
- Promotional poster
- Starring: Kerry Washington; Scott Foley; Darby Stanchfield; Katie Lowes; Guillermo Diaz; Jeff Perry; Joshua Malina; Bellamy Young; Portia de Rossi; Joe Morton; Cornelius Smith Jr.; Tony Goldwyn
- No. of episodes: 16

Release
- Original network: ABC
- Original release: January 19 – May 18, 2017

Season chronology
- ← Previous; Season 5 Next → Season 7

The sixth season of the American television drama series Scandal was ordered on March 3, 2016, by ABC. It began airing on January 26, 2017, in the United States on ABC. The season includes the 100th episode of the series, being the tenth episode of this season. The season was produced by ABC Studios, in association with ShondaLand Production Company; the showrunner being Shonda Rhimes.

The season continues the story of Olivia Pope's crisis management firm, Olivia Pope & Associates, and its employees, as well as staff at the White House in Washington, D.C. Season six had eleven series regulars, all returning from the previous season, out of which six are part of the original cast of eight regulars from the first season. The season continued to air in the Thursday 9:00 pm timeslot, the same as the previous season, but aired in the mid-season schedule due to Kerry Washington's pregnancy. The episode order was also shortened from 22 to 16 episodes as a result of Washington's pregnancy.

== Overview ==
The series focuses on Olivia Pope and her crisis management firm, Olivia Pope & Associates, and its team, as well as staff at the White House in Washington, D.C., in their efforts to deal with and contain political scandals.

== Cast ==
=== Main cast ===
- Kerry Washington as Olivia Pope
- Scott Foley as NSA Director Jacob "Jake" Ballard
- Darby Stanchfield as Chief of Staff Abigail "Abby" Whelan
- Katie Lowes as Quinn Perkins
- Guillermo Diaz as Diego "Huck" Muñoz
- Jeff Perry as Cyrus Beene
- Joshua Malina as Attorney General David Rosen
- Bellamy Young as Senator Melody "Mellie" Grant
- Portia de Rossi as Elizabeth North
- Joe Morton as Elijah "Eli"/"Rowan" Pope
- Cornelius Smith Jr. as Press Secretary Marcus Walker
- Tony Goldwyn as President Fitzgerald "Fitz" Thomas Grant III

=== Recurring cast ===
- Kate Burton as Sally Langston
- George Newbern as Charlie
- Ricardo Chavira as Governor/President-elect Francisco Vargas
- Zoe Perry as Samantha Ruland
- David Warshofsky as Theodore Peus
- Tessie Santiago as Luna Vargas
- Brian Letscher as Tom Larsen
- Matthew Del Negro as Michael Ambruso
- Khandi Alexander as Maya Pope
- Paul Adelstein as Leo Bergen
- Jessalyn Gilsig as Vanessa Moss
- Saycon Sengbloh as Angela Webster
- Phoebe Neidhardt as Meg Mitchell
- Chelsea Kurtz as Jennifer Fields

== Episodes ==
No. overall	No. in season	Title	Directed by	Written by	Original release date	Prod. code	U.S. viewers (millions)
91	1	"Survival of the Fittest"	Tom Verica	Shonda Rhimes	January 26, 2017	601	7.62
The election results of the presidential race between Mellie Grant and Francisco Vargas are announced; Francisco Vargas won. Mellie initially refuses to accept defeat but eventually realizes she must call and concede. While making his acceptance speech, Frankie is assassinated. That leads David to tell Fitz that since Frankie and Cyrus weren't elected by electoral college, Cyrus isn't president, so Fitz must choose between Cyrus and Mellie. Olivia suspects Cyrus of murdering Frankie Vargas and has Huck, Quinn, and Charlie start looking for evidence. She visits the hospital and sees Cyrus looking disheveled, leading to her telling Fitz she no longer suspects Cyrus. He tells Cyrus that he is picking him to be president and announces it on TV. Quinn, Charlie, and Huck discover a voicemail from a Vargas campaign volunteer claiming that Cyrus killed Frankie. Olivia visits Cyrus and tells him she won't stop until she can prove he is guilty.
92	2	"Hardball"	Allison Liddi-Brown	Matt Byrne	February 2, 2017	602	6.54
Olivia is sure Cyrus is responsible for Frankie's assassination, but FBI Director Angela Webster says Cyrus isn't a suspect. Quinn is now engaged to Charlie, and Olivia tells her and Huck to keep looking into Jennifer Fields. Fitz has Cyrus and Mellie come to the Oval to form a compromise. Cyrus asks Mellie to be his vice president, but Mellie flat out refuses. Quinn steals some FBI files pertaining to Frankie's case. Mellie tells Olivia that she has been having sex with Marcus, and Olivia warns her about Marcus' intentions. Marcus is offered the press secretary job position, and Mellie gets upset that Olivia is the one behind the offer. Mellie breaks up with Marcus, thinking that he was only with her for political advancement. Mellie imagines life in the oval, then goes to Olivia's office to make a truce. Huck announces that he found something on Jennifer Field's laptop. Olivia shows Fitz the footage of Cyrus and Frankie arguing, where Frankie tells Cyrus once he is elected he intends to put Cyrus in jail. Olivia asks if the White House will finally investigate Cyrus, and Fitz sets about to do that.
93	3	"Fates Worse Than Death"	Scott Foley	Mark Fish	February 9, 2017	603	6.22
Fitz offers a deal to Cyrus. Olivia doubts Cyrus' ascend to vice presidential candidate. A series of flashbacks reveal Frankie and Cyrus' rather complicated relationship before Frankie's assassination on election night, including security footage of Frankie vowing to put Cyrus in jail.
94	4	"The Belt"	Tom Verica	Paul William Davies	February 16, 2017	606	6.06
A shocking revelation about Tom Larson's whereabouts on election night could dash Mellie's presidential hopes. Cyrus Beene is revealed to be convicted for the murder of President-elect Frankie Vargas, and is taken to jail. On another side, Huck finds himself a new love interest. Questions arise if Cyrus is actually innocent or not.
95	5	"They All Bow Down"	Millicent Shelton	Zahir McGhee	March 9, 2017	604	5.26
Jake's involvement in the murder of President-elect Vargas and staffer Jennifer Fields is revealed in confessions from him, from his wife and in a series of flashbacks.
96	6	"Extinction"	Tony Goldwyn	Chris Van Dusen	March 16, 2017	605	5.63
It is revealed who really stood behind the assassination of Vargas, which makes Eli sure that his daughter will have a guaranteed win, but has to go through hard decisions and possible regrets before covering it up.
97	7	"A Traitor Among Us"	Tom Verica	Alison Schapker	March 23, 2017	607	5.40
After Frankie Vargas' assassin is revealed, Olivia asks Huck to kill Rowan. Huck finds Rowan, who tells him the truth, Olivia is in danger. Huck begins to realize that there is a traitor among them and he begins to trust no one.
98	8	"A Stomach for Blood"	Oliver Bokelberg	Severiano Canales	March 30, 2017	608	6.57
Events before and on Election Night are seen from Abby's perspective, and who she had to deal with and what led to her actions that night; that also reveals a thirst for power.
99	9	"Dead in the Water"	Nicole Rubio	Michelle Lirtzman	April 6, 2017	609	5.10
After Meg shoots Huck and kills Jennifer it is revealed that she is working with the group behind Frankie's assassination, and has Olivia under surveillance. Huck wakes up in a car trunk with a now dead Jennifer next to him. Meg pushes the car into a lake he finds a way out and swims to shore. Charlie and Quinn find Meg in her apartment; Quinn tortures her in order to find out Huck's location, however, they are unsuccessful when Quinn kills Meg. Abby visits Olivia, who is angry since she found out that Abby worked with those responsible for killing Frankie and is responsible for Huck's disappearance. OPA realizes Huck is probably with Jennifer, so they track Jennifer's phone to find Huck half dead. Fitz shows up and consoles Olivia. He encourages her to forgive Abby but she doesn't want to. Quinn is at Huck's side and is yelling at him for getting into danger and almost dying. He then wakes up and they hold hands while Charlie is watching.
100	10	"The Decision"	Sharat Raju	Johanna Lee	April 13, 2017	610	5.35
The 100th episode. Olivia is propelled to wonder what would have happened if she hadn't said yes to rigging the election. Suddenly they are on the plane where they planned to rig Defiance, and Olivia says no, leaving Governor Samuel Reston to win the election. Olivia and Fitz say goodbye in a hotel hallway and she leaves for D.C. Two months later Olivia has naturally curly hair and is working out of a run-down storefront office. As she is leaving her apartment for a date with Leo Bergen, she sees Fitz. He flew from California to tell her he left Mellie. He asks Olivia to marry him and she says yes. Fitz and Olivia are happily married but unhappiness soon settles in. Fitz is doing a television news show called "The Grant Report." Cyrus is married to Mellie and he pushes her to run for president. Mellie finds out about Cyrus' previous relationship with James and asks for a divorce. Fitz and Olivia work out their problems and decide to buy a house together. Back in the present timeline, Olivia finds Fitz on the balcony where she tells him that she is in.
101	11	"Trojan Horse"	Jann Turner	Jess Brownell & Nicholas Nardini	April 20, 2017	611	5.11
The electoral college set to meet to determine the next president. Mellie wants to keep fighting but Olivia says since Cyrus has been exonerated, he deserves to be president; he is later released from prison. Mellie gives a concession speech but changes her mind and decides to keep fighting for the presidency. Mellie tries to convince Olivia to help her continue to fight for the presidency. Rowan warns Olivia to stop fighting for Cyrus otherwise she will continue to be in danger. Cyrus gives a press conference and says he doesn't deserve to be president but will do his best to uphold Frankie's legacy. The Peus and Ruland are with Mellie and Liz in Mellie's office, telling Mellie that she will be in charge but they will be in control. Ruland smashes Elizabeth in the head with a golf club, killing her. Angela Webster informs Fitz she found evidence against Olivia and he tells her she is only going after Olivia out of jealousy. Fitz has Angela removed from the investigation and transfers her out of state. Rowan is taken into White House custody. He tells Olivia that Rowan is in his custody and shows him sitting in the Oval Office, safe. She kisses him, and they have sex.
102	12	"Mercy"	Nzingha Stewart	Severiano Canales & Ameni Rozsa	April 27, 2017	612	5.29
Olivia visits Rowan, who is in custody but doesn't feel safe. Thus, he wants to flee to another country—which Fitz declines. Peus visits Olivia and tries to make her force Jake to resign as vice president, otherwise he will leak photos of Jake cleaning up Elizabeth's body. Jake does step down. Huck flies a drone (potentially carrying a bomb) onto the White House in order to get the secret service to take Mellie and Fitz away from Ms. Ruland. Abby and Ms. Ruland are put in a bunker together while Mellie and Fitz are taken into a room where Marcus, Cyrus, David, Olivia, and Jake are waiting. Olivia explains that the drone gives them time to figure out how to defeat Peus and Ms. Ruland. Cyrus suggests a Grant-Beene ticket, which Mellie shoots down. They ask Rowan for help but he refuses. Mellie and Marcus talk, leading to her offering the vice-presidency to Cyrus, who declines. While in the bunker with Abby, Ms. Ruland watches Mellie's press conference where she announces that Luna Vargas is her new vice president.
103	13	"The Box"	Steph Green	Raamla Mohamed & Austin Guzman	May 4, 2017	613	5.15
Peus plants bombs across the country and says he will disable them once Samantha and Mellie are back under his control. He detonates one bomb while he is on the phone with Olivia. Olivia and Fitz visit Rowan, who believes that there is no republic, and he wants to run. Ruland offers to tell him everything she knows in exchange for an immunity deal. David delivers the paperwork to her and she reveals her name is really Grace. Olivia and Huck find out that Peus sent Rowan a box every week after Frankie's assassination containing 11-pound bricks. She tells Fitz, and he goes to talk to Rowan, who is mad that Olivia chose Fitz over him. He explains that a human head weighs 8-11 pounds and every time he opened a box, he feared he would see Olivia's head inside. Rowan meets Samantha and steals a secret service agent's gun so they can run. In a montage, Rowan and Fitz devise a plan so that Samantha will lead them to Peus. Jake finds Peus and shoots him and Rowan stabs Samantha to death with a dinosaur tooth.
104	14	"Head Games"	Zetna Fuentes	Chris Van Dusen & Juan Carlos Fernandez	May 11, 2017	614	5.10
Quinn is selecting a dress for her wedding to Charlie and Huck is her maid of honor. Fitz relieves Abby from her White House duties as he doesn't trust her. OPA works on a hate crime case, in which the defendant is asking for a presidential pardon. The defendant is accused of lynching someone. Huck and Quinn look into the hate crime while Olivia goes to meet Rowan for dinner. Olivia tries to convince her father to stay in D.C. to have a relationship with her, but he says that the dinner is goodbye. Quinn goes to the Oval Office and says Olivia isn't doing her job anymore, leaving Quinn to fight for the client. Jake finds Ruland's apartment and that her real name was Gertrude. She and Peus were working for someone else, Olivia's mother. Mellie tries to get Marcus to be her press secretary but he declines and agrees to run Fitz's foundation. Olivia leaves OPA to Quinn and gives Quinn her office.
105	15	"Tick Tock"	Salli Richardson-Whitfield	Zahir McGhee & Michelle Lirtzman	May 18, 2017	615	5.23
David, Fitz, Olivia, and Jake work together to capture Maya and put her in the Pentagon. They think that she is planning an attack on Mellie's inauguration, which Maya denies. Olivia pretends to be on her mother's side in order to get her to reveal her plan, but Maya catches on, leading Olivia to strangle her until Jake comes in and prevents her from killing Maya. Olivia apologizes to Mellie for failing to make her inauguration safer. Olivia releases her mother so she can find out who is planning to assassinate Mellie.
106	16	"Transfer of Power"	Tony Goldwyn	Matt Byrne & Mark Fish	May 18, 2017	616	5.23
Olivia and Fitz celebrate his last night in the White House by having sex, despite that Fitz is not pleased that Olivia released Maya. As Mellie is being sworn in, the Gladiators find out that there is a traitor standing on the dais and Olivia realizes that it must be Luna Vargas. Fitz leaves Olivia, and D.C., to go run his foundation in Vermont. To avoid a scandal that would wreck the new presidency, Olivia forces Luna to take some pills that will simulate a heart attack rather than having her arrested. Olivia moves government funding to B613 and becomes Command while remaining Mellie's chief of staff. Olivia sits with Cyrus, they discuss Luna's involvement, Cyrus uses the same phrases Luna did to justify Frankie's death, leading Olivia to realize that Cyrus was the one who put the idea of killing Frankie in Luna's head. She also tells him that she is nominating him for vice president.

== Production ==
=== Development ===
Scandal was renewed for a sixth season on March 3, 2016, by ABC. The series continued to air at Thursdays in the timeslot 9 p.m. E.T. like the previous season. Production began in July, confirmed by executive-producer Tom Verica. After Kerry Washington announced that she was pregnant again, TVLine reported that ABC was considering moving the show's premiere to midseason. In addition, the episode order for the sixth season was reduced from 22 to 16 episodes. During ABC's annual upfront presentation in May, it was announced that Scandal will premiere during midseason, following a fall run of the new series Notorious. Production began on July 13, 2016, with director and executive producer Tom Verica announcing that the crew was scouting for filming locations. The table read for the premiere was on July 26, 2016, with filming starting soon after. A teaser trailer was released on November 1, 2016, on YouTube. An official trailer for the sixth season was released by ABC on November 3, 2016. The season began airing on January 26, 2017. A promotional poster was released by ABC on November 29, 2016. On February 10, 2017, ABC announced that the series had been renewed for a seventh season. It was later announced it will be the final season.

=== Writing ===
When talking about the presidential campaign storyline in the show, showrunner Shonda Rhimes talked to The Hollywood Reporter about the character Fitzgerald Thomas Grant III not being president anymore. She said "I can't tell you any of that—but there is a plan. Tony is not going anywhere; where would he go?!". Other cast members spoke their opinion about Grant's next arc without the presidency. Tony Goldwyn, the actor playing Fitz, commented "He'll be much happier as the post-president than as the president." Jeff Perry, playing Cyrus Beene, said that "I'd love our show to invent a great role for a president after he's out of office that would reverberate back to the real world." Executive producer Betsy Beers voiced her excitement about the character doing "anything he wanted". Other cast members compared Fitz's next move with former U.S. presidents Jimmy Carter and Bill Clinton.

In an interview with Entertainment Weekly, Rhimes talked about the presidential election and its factor into the sixth season. She said that it would in both ways, adding that "We are basically going to start our season on election night. Yes, it is going to play into our season, but we're not going to spend our time playing an election."

=== Casting ===
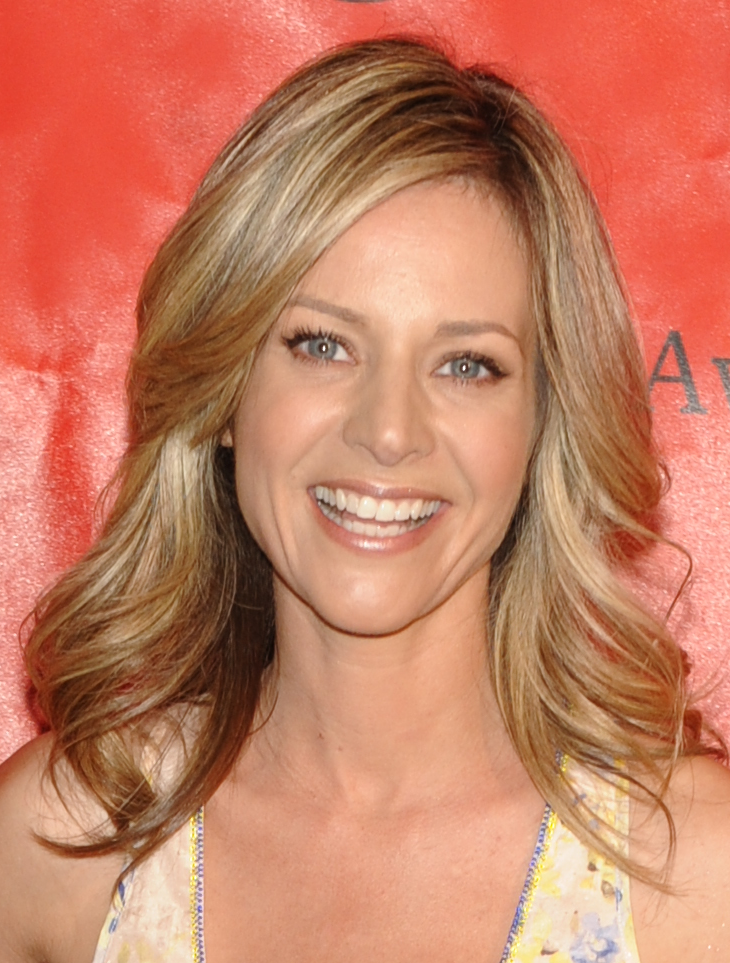
Jessalyn Gilsig replaced Joelle Carter as Vanessa Moss.

The sixth season had twelve roles receiving star billing, with eleven of them returning from the previous season, eight of which part of the original cast from the first season. Kerry Washington continued to play her role as protagonist of the series, Olivia Pope, a former White House Director of Communications with her own crisis management firm. Darby Stanchfield played Abby Whelan, the White House Press Secretary, Katie Lowes portrayed Quinn Perkins, and Guillermo Diaz portrayed Huck, the troubled tech guy who works for Olivia. Cornelius Smith Jr. continued his role as activist Marcus Walker. Jeff Perry portrayed Cyrus Beene, Chief of Staff at the White House who was fired by Fitz but later rehired. Portia de Rossi played Elizabeth North, the new Chief of Staff at the White House, and later the Chief of Staff for the Vice President. Joshua Malina played the role of David Rosen, former U.S. Attorney, then Attorney General. Bellamy Young continued to act as Senator Melody "Mellie" Grant, who was kicked out of the White House by Fitz, and later joined the presidential campaign for president. Tony Goldwyn continued to portray President Fitzgerald "Fitz" Thomas Grant III. Scott Foley portrayed Jake Ballard a former B613 agent and later the head of the NSA.

TVLine announced on August 6, 2016, that Glee alum Jessalyn Gilsig will replace Joelle Carter as Vanessa Moss, Jake Ballard's wife. Entertainment Weekly announced on December 5, 2016, that series regular Jeff Perry's daughter Zoe Perry had been cast in a recurring role for the sixth season. It was announced on April 20, 2017, that Portia de Rossi would be departing the show after her character was killed off in the eleventh episode.

== Reception ==
The review aggregator website Rotten Tomatoes reports an 95% approval rating with an average rating of 8.3/10 based on 19 reviews. The website's consensus reads, "As shocking and thrilling as ever, Scandal eases into its sixth season with as much confidence as Olivia Pope herself."

=== Live + SD ratings ===
No. in series	No. in season	Episode	Air date	Time slot (EST)	Rating/Share (18–49)	Viewers (m)	18–49 Rank	Viewership rank	Drama rank
91	1	"Survival of the Fittest"	January 26, 2017	Thursdays; 9:00 p.m.	2.0/7	7.62	2	3	TBD
92	2	"Hardball"	February 2, 2017	Thursdays; 9:00 p.m.	1.7/6	6.54	4	6	TBD
93	3	"Fates Worse Than Death"	February 9, 2017	Thursdays; 9:00 p.m.	1.6/5	6.22	3	5	TBD
94	4	"The Belt"	February 16, 2017	Thursdays; 9:00 p.m.	1.6/6	6.06	3	5	TBD
95	5	"They All Bow Down"	March 9, 2017	Thursdays; 9:00 p.m.	1.4/5	5.26	3	7	TBD
96	6	"Extinction"	March 16, 2017	Thursdays; 9:00 p.m.	1.4/5	5.63	2	2	TBD
97	7	"A Traitor Among Us"	March 23, 2017	Thursdays; 9:00 p.m.	1.3/5	5.40	TBD	TBD	TBD
98	8	"A Stomach for Blood"	March 30, 2017	Thursdays; 9:00 p.m.	1.5/6	6.57	TBD	TBD	TBD
99	9	"Dead in the Water"	April 6, 2017	Thursdays; 9:00 p.m.	1.2/5	5.10	TBD	TBD	TBD
100	10	"The Decision"	April 13, 2017	Thursdays; 9:00 p.m.	1.3/6	5.35	TBD	TBD	TBD
101	11	"Trojan Horse"	April 20, 2017	Thursdays; 9:00 p.m.	1.3/5	5.11		TBD	TBD
102	12	"Mercy"	April 27, 2017	Thursdays; 9:00 p.m.	1.4/5	5.29	TBD	TBD	TBD
103	13	"The Box"	May 4, 2017	Thursdays; 9:00 p.m.	1.3/5	5.15	TBD	TBD	TBD
104	14	"Head Games"	May 11, 2017	Thursdays; 9:00 p.m.	1.4/5	5.10	TBD	TBD	TBD
105	15	"Tick, Tock"	May 18, 2017	Thursdays; 9:00 p.m.	1.2/5	5.23	TBD	TBD	TBD
106	16	"Transfer of Power"	May 18, 2017	Thursdays; 9:00 p.m.	1.2/5	5.23	TBD	TBD	TBD

=== Live + 7 day (DVR) ratings ===
No. in series	No. in season	Episode	Air date	Time slot (EST)	18–49 rating increase	Viewers (millions) increase	Total 18-49	Total viewers (millions)	Ref
91	1	"Survival of the Fittest"	January 26, 2017	Thursdays; 9:00 p.m.	1.4	3.30	3.4	10.93	
92	2	"Hardball"	February 2, 2017	Thursdays; 9:00 p.m.	1.2	3.18	2.9	9.73	
93	3	"Fates Worse Than Death"	February 9, 2017	Thursdays; 9:00 p.m.	1.2	3.06	2.8	9.28	
94	4	"The Belt"	February 16, 2017	Thursdays; 9:00 p.m.	1.2	3.01	2.8	9.08	
95	5	"They All Bow Down"	March 9, 2017	Thursdays; 9:00 p.m.	1.4	3.19	2.6	8.47	
96	6	"Extinction"	March 16, 2017	Thursdays; 9:00 p.m.	1.1	2.90	2.5	8.53	
97	7	"A Traitor Among Us"	March 23, 2017	Thursdays; 9:00 p.m.	1.2	2.93	2.5	8.33	
98	8	"A Stomach for Blood"	March 30, 2017	Thursdays; 9:00 p.m.	1.0	2.59	2.5	8.17	
99	9	"Dead In the Water"	April 6, 2017	Thursdays; 9:00 p.m.	0.9	2.53	2.2	7.87	
100	10	"The Decision"	April 13, 2017	Thursdays; 9:00 p.m.	1.1	2.88	2.4	8.14	
101	11	"Trojan Horse"	April 20, 2017	Thursdays; 9:00 p.m.	TBD	TBD	TBD	TBD	TBD
102	12	"Mercy"	April 27, 2017	Thursdays; 9:00 p.m.	TBD	TBD	TBD	TBD	TBD
103	13	"The Box"	May 4, 2017	Thursdays; 9:00 p.m.	1.1	2.98	2.4	8.09	TBD
104	14	"Head Games"	May 11, 2017	Thursdays; 9:00 p.m.	TBD	TBD	TBD	TBD	TBD
105	15	"Tick, Tock"	May 18, 2017	Thursdays; 9:00 p.m.	1.2	3.01	2.4	8.23	
106	16	"Transfer of Power"	May 18, 2017	Thursdays; 9:00 p.m.	1.2	3.01	2.4	8.23	

== Awards and nominations ==
Award	Category	Nominee	Result
People's Choice Award
People's Choice Award	Favorite Dramatic TV Actress	Kerry Washington	Nominated
People's Choice Award	Favorite Dramatic TV Actor	Scott Foley	Nominated
NAACP Image Award
NAACP Image Award	Outstanding Actress in a Drama Series	Kerry Washington	Nominated
NAACP Image Award	Outstanding Supporting Actor in a Drama Series	Joe Morton	Nominated
