= Scandal season 5 =

Season of American television series Scandal

Scandal
- Season 5
- DVD cover
- Starring: Kerry Washington; Scott Foley; Darby Stanchfield; Katie Lowes; Guillermo Diaz; Jeff Perry; Joshua Malina; Bellamy Young; Portia de Rossi; Joe Morton; Cornelius Smith Jr.; Tony Goldwyn
- No. of episodes: 21

Release
- Original network: ABC
- Original release: September 24, 2015 – May 12, 2016

Season chronology
- ← Previous; Season 4 Next → Season 6

The fifth season of the American television drama series Scandal was ordered on May 7, 2015, by ABC, and began airing on September 24, 2015, in the United States on ABC. The season was produced by ABC Studios, in association with ShondaLand Production Company; the showrunner being Shonda Rhimes.

The season continues the story of Olivia Pope's crisis management firm, Olivia Pope & Associates, and its staff, as well as staff at the White House in Washington, D.C. Season five has eleven series regulars, all returning from the previous season, out of which six are part of the original cast of eight regulars from the first season and three new regulars were added. The season will continue to air in the Thursday 9:00 pm timeslot, the same as the previous season as it was moved to make room for ShondaLand Production Company's new TV series, How to Get Away with Murder.

On March 3, 2016, ABC announced that Scandal was renewed for a sixth season.

== Overview ==
The series focuses on Olivia Pope and her crisis management firm, Olivia Pope & Associates, and its staff, as well as staff at the White House in Washington D.C. as political scandals occur and they must try to deal with them.

== Cast and characters ==
=== Main ===
- Kerry Washington as Olivia Pope
- Scott Foley as Jacob "Jake" Ballard
- Darby Stanchfield as Abigail "Abby" Whelan
- Katie Lowes as Quinn Perkins
- Guillermo Diaz as Diego "Huck" Muñoz
- Jeff Perry as Cyrus Beene
- Joshua Malina as Attorney General David Rosen
- Bellamy Young as Senator Melody "Mellie" Grant
- Portia de Rossi as VP's Chief of Staff Elizabeth North
- Joe Morton as Rowan "Eli" Pope
- Cornelius Smith Jr. as Marcus Walker
- Tony Goldwyn as President Fitzgerald "Fitz" Thomas Grant III

=== Recurring ===
- Artemis Pebdani as Vice President Susan Ross
- Kate Burton as Sally Langston, former vice president
- George Newbern as Charlie
- Ricardo Chavira as Governor Francisco Vargas of Pennsylvania
- Mía Maestro as Elise Martin
- Gregg Henry as Hollis Doyle
- Norm Lewis as Senate Majority Leader Edison Davis
- Joelle Carter as Vanessa Moss
- Erica Shaffer as News Reporter
- Mackenzie Astin as Noah Baker
- John Prosky as Senator Gibson
- Rose Abdoo as Senator Linda Moskowitz
- Romy Rosemont as Patty Snell
- Paul Adelstein as Leo Bergen
- Brian Letscher as Tom Larsen
- Matthew Del Negro as Michael Ambruso
- Annabeth Gish as Lillian Forrester
- Danny Pino as Alejandro "Alex" Vargas

=== Guest stars ===
- Adam J. Yeend as Danny Mendoza
- Dearbhla Molloy as Queen Isabel
- Adam Fergus as Prince Richard
- Hilty Bowen as Princess Emily
- Josh Brener as Gavin Price
- Julie Claire as Francesca Hunter
- William Russ as Frank Holland
- Denise Crosby as Janet Holland
- Brian White as Franklin Russell
- Jon Tenney as Andrew Nichols

== Production ==
=== Development ===
Scandal was renewed for a fifth season on May 7, 2015, by ABC. The series will continue to air at Thursdays in the timeslot 9:00 p.m. E.T. like the previous season, as it was moved to the timeslot to make room for ShondaLand Production Company's new TV series, How to Get Away with Murder. Production began on May 21, 2015, when Rhimes announced on Twitter that the writers were in full swing mapping the fifth season.

The remaining fall schedule for ABC was announced on November 16, 2015, where it was announced that Scandal would air nine episodes in the fall with the fall finale to air on November 19, 2015, just like the rest of ABC's primetime lineup "TGIT" Grey's Anatomy and How To Get Away with Murder, which was the same last year. The remaining 12 episodes will air after the winter break, beginning on February 11, 2016, as a result of ABC airing the television miniseries Madoff over two nights on February 3–4, 2016 in the same time-slot as Scandal and Grey's Anatomy. The show was renewed by ABC for a sixth season on March 3, 2016.

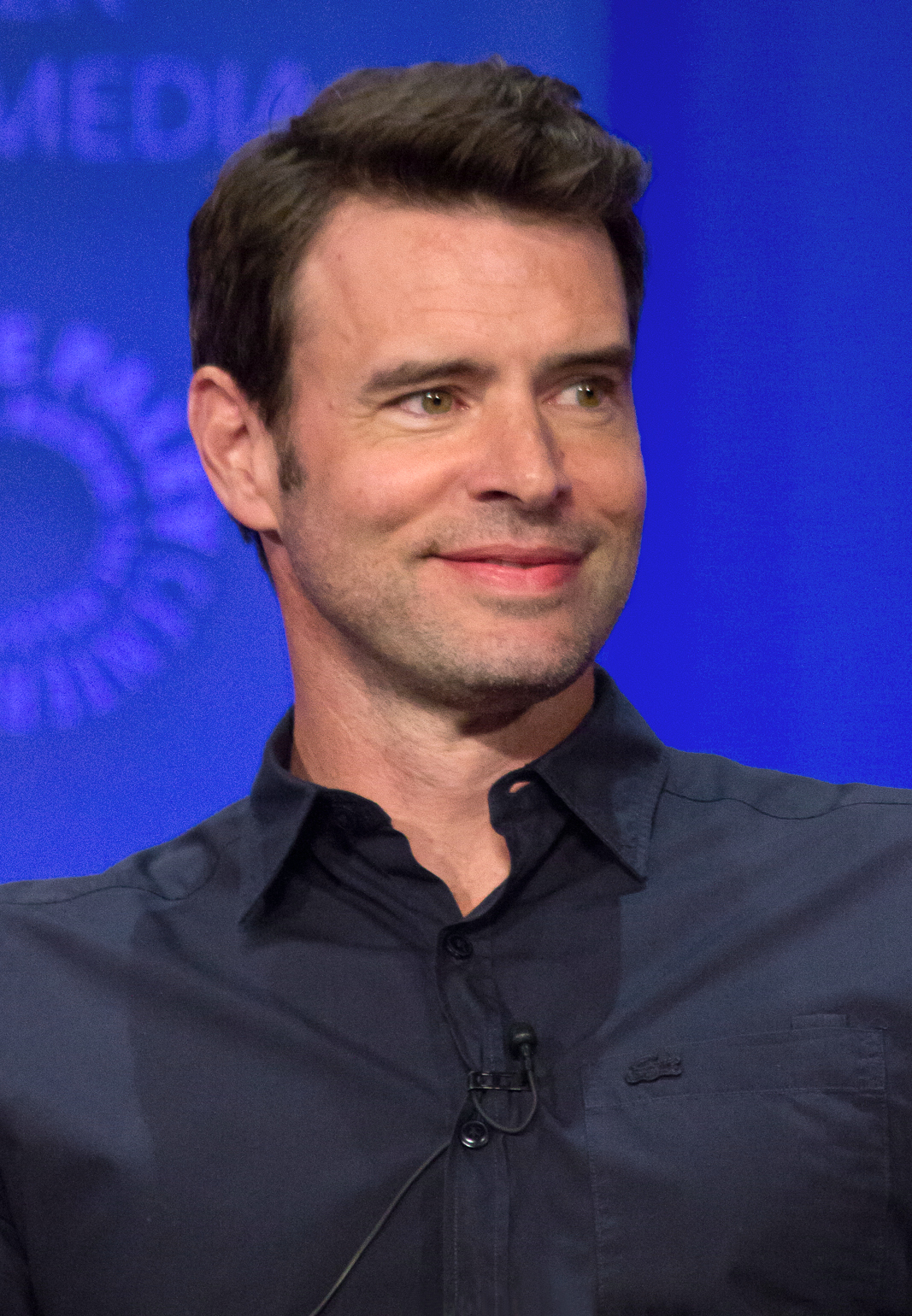
Scott Foley directed an episode for the season.

=== Writing ===
Shonda Rhimes said in an interview that the fifth season will begin only a few days after the events in the fourth-season finale. She stated that the fifth season will see Olivia and Fitz the only people standing in a single piece, as she said "The world had been fairly blown apart for everybody except Olivia and Fitz. Everybody else was in a fairly blown apart place ... We pick up right there in that environment and we see what happens next." Rhimes continued talking about Cyrus and Mellie and their situation of not being in the White House anymore.

Rhimes also confirmed that "the reconstitution" of Team OPA would happen in the fifth season, as Rhimes revealed in an interview with TVLine, as she explained that the Gladiator conceit was sidelined a bit in the fourth season to instead "healing" Olivia. She noted that "a lot of times it was just Huck and Quinn gladiating by themselves. And that wasn’t the same dynamic."

=== Filming ===
Scouting began in the beginning of July. The table read for the first episode was announced to occur on July 14, 2015, by Kerry Washington. The title of the season premiere, "Heavy is the Head" was revealed on August 8, 2015, by its director Tom Verica on Twitter. Filming for the season began on July 16, 2015.

Several actors working on ShondaLand-produced shows directed an episode for the fifth season. Tony Goldwyn from Scandal directed the second and 17th episodes, making it the fourth and fifth episodes he has directed on the show. Chandra Wilson, who plays Dr. Miranda Bailey on Grey's Anatomy, directed her first Scandal episode, which was the sixth episode "Get Out of Jail, Free". Scott Foley from Scandal also directed his first Scandal episode, the 16th named "The Miseducation of Susan Ross". Foley's director-debut was announced on Twitter by Foley himself and executive producer Tom Verica.

=== Casting ===
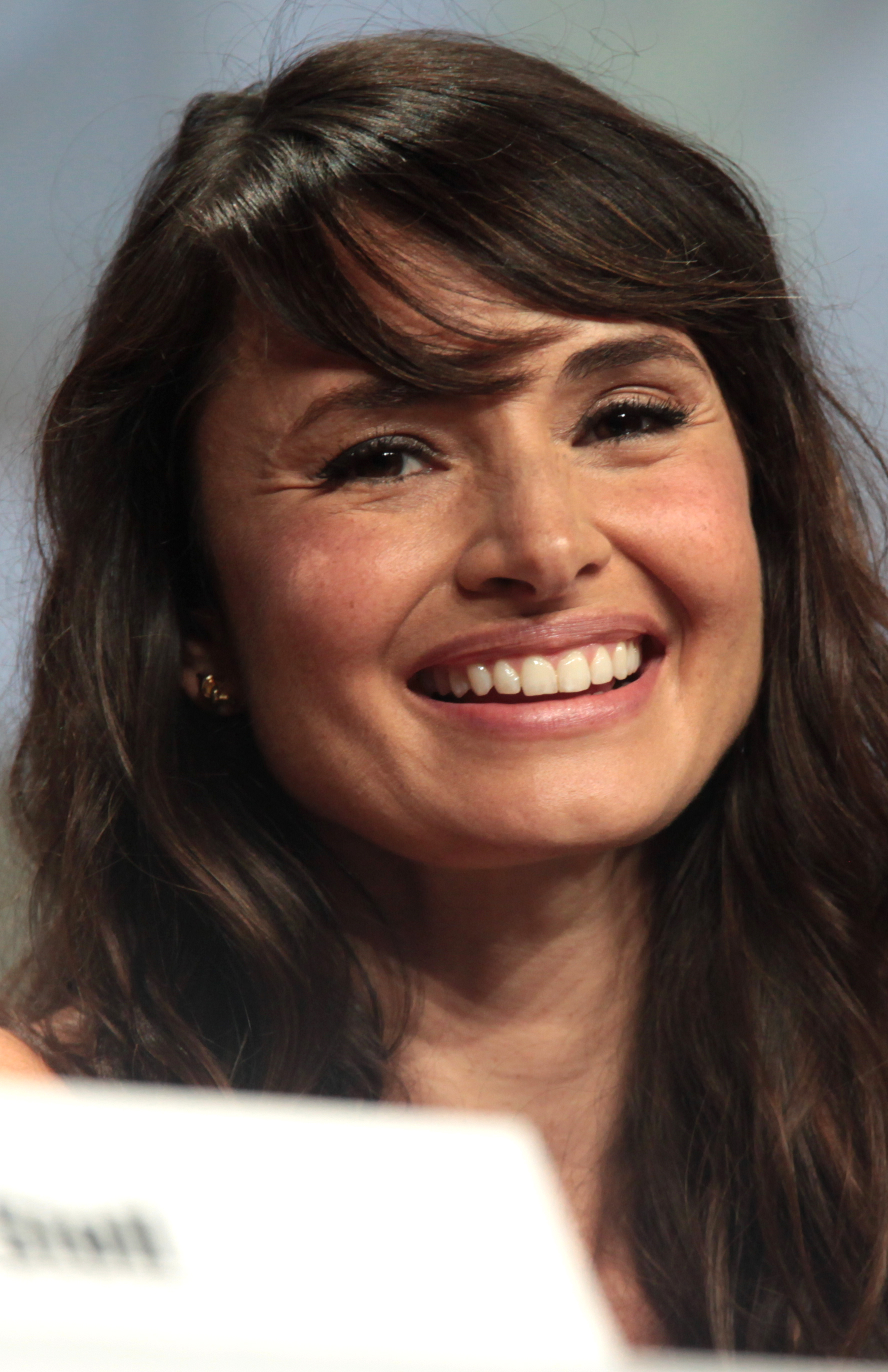
Mía Maestro was cast in a recurring role.

The fifth season had twelve roles receiving star billing, with eleven of them returning from the previous season, eight of which part of the original cast from the first season, and three new cast members being added. Kerry Washington continued to play her role as protagonist of the series, Olivia Pope, a former White House Director of Communications with her own crisis management firm. Darby Stanchfield played Abby Whelan, the White House Press Secretary, Katie Lowes portrayed Quinn Perkins, and Guillermo Diaz portrayed Huck, the troubled tech guy who works for Olivia. Cornelius Smith Jr. continued his role as activist Marcus Walker. after being upgraded to series regular. Jeff Perry continued to portray Cyrus Beene, chief of staff at the White House who was fired by Fitz but later rehired. Portia de Rossi played Elizabeth North, the new chief of staff at the White House, and later the chief of staff for the vice president. Joshua Malina played the role of David Rosen, former U.S. Attorney, now Attorney General. Bellamy Young continued to act as First Lady/Senator Melody "Mellie" Grant, who was kicked out of the White House by Fitz, and later joined the presidential campaign for president. Tony Goldwyn continued to portray President Fitzgerald "Fitz" Thomas Grant III. Scott Foley portrayed Jake Ballard a former B613 agent and later the head of the NSA.

On May 14, 2015, after the fourth-season finale, it was announced that Portia de Rossi had been promoted to a series regular for the fifth season. TVLine reported in late April that a new gladiator would be added to Olivia Pope & Associates, and the person would be a guest star. It was also announced on July 7, 2015, that Cornelius Smith Jr., who had a guest role in season four playing activist Marcus Walker, will be returning as a series regular for the fifth season, but will not appear until later in the fall. On August 24, 2015, it was announced that actress Mia Maestro would be recurring during the fifth season, but the specifics of her role were not revealed. Julie Claire was announced on September 1, 2015, to have joined the cast in a guest role.

It was announced on February 4, 2016, that Ricardo Chavira would join the show in a recurring role, and would first appear in the eleventh episode. Annabeth Gish was announced on February 8, 2016, to have been cast in a recurring role. The Hollywood Reporter announced on February 18, 2016, that Joe Morton who plays Rowan "Eli" Pope had been promoted to a series regular, and was credited as a regular cast member for the first time in the twelfth episode.

== Episodes ==
No. overall	No. in season	Title	Directed by	Written by	Original release date	Prod. code	U.S. viewers (millions)
70	1	"Heavy Is the Head"	Tom Verica	Shonda Rhimes	September 24, 2015	501	10.25
Olivia and Fitz are back together again and enjoying every scandalous moment together. After having sex, Olivia and Fitz go to a dinner in the White House to honor the queen of Caledonia. Fitz wants Queen Isabel to allow him to build a naval base on Caledonian soil, but she is hesitant. Fitz and Olivia are in bed when the queen calls Olivia. She goes to the scene where Princess Emily of Caledonia has died in a car crash. Prince Richard insists on getting all of the photos the press took of her dead body to preserve her legacy. Olivia figures out that the car was hacked, meaning she was murdered, along with her bodyguard who was also in the car. Princess Emily was having an affair with her bodyguard, making Prince Richard a suspect. After persuasion from Olivia, Fitz attends Mellie's swearing in. Mellie offers to stand by Fitz and pretend that he didn't cheat on her if he apologizes. He says no, and tells her he wants a divorce. Fitz tells Olivia that he asked Mellie for a divorce. It turns out that the queen knew about the affair, and that Princess Emily was pregnant. Queen Isabel had her killed. Elizabeth North realizes that Fitz and Olivia are a couple again when they argue about how to handle Princess Emily's death. Elizabeth tells Abby that they are together, and Abby feels betrayed. Mellie visits Cyrus and asks him to work with her. He refuses in hope that Fitz will want him back, but Mellie tells him Fitz doesn't want either of them. Olivia goes home to find Huck on her couch. He tells her that he was emotionally hurt by Quinn, and asks her to fix him. Olivia doesn't know how, so Huck seeks help from Jake instead. Back on the White House Balcony, Olivia tells Fitz that before they go public with their relationship, they need to fix some problems they have, "how can we make it work in public when we can barely make it work in private?" Fitz agrees, then Abby finds them kissing on the White House balcony, and tells them there is an interview that they need to see. Sally reports that Fitz has been having an affair with Olivia, and shows a picture of them making out as proof.
71	2	"Yes"	Tony Goldwyn	Heather Mitchell	October 1, 2015	502	9.12
Sally Langston continues her report about Fitz and Olivia's affair, revealing more photos as proof. Olivia, Huck and Quinn dive into a new case that takes Olivia out of D.C. (and away from Fitz) and puts her with Jake as they work to find the son of a wealthy man who is accused of killing his father. Meanwhile, back at the White House, Fitz is determined to find who's responsible for leaking Olivia's name and photos to the press, and Abby receives unexpected guidance from a master of damage control, Cyrus, as she struggles to catch a break with the massive feedback to the leaked photos of Olivia and Fitz. Fitz apologizes to Mellie and brings her back to the White House for an interview that reaffirms their marriage. After getting back to D.C. the press asks Olivia if she is the president's mistress, and she says yes.
72	3	"Paris is Burning"	Jann Turner	Matt Byrne	October 8, 2015	503	8.76
Olivia and Fitz face some very big consequences as the interviewer, Noah, has a recording of Mellie and Fitz lying about their marriage at almost the exact same time Olivia confirms her affair. Fitz suggests telling the truth in the interview, but Mellie refuses because it makes her look bad as a senator. Mellie brings in Cyrus to negotiate with Fitz to make sure she gets her way so she'll do the interview. Meanwhile, Abby shows Olivia she is fully capable of handling working at the White House, by giving a press conference where she tells the press that Olivia has a certain reputation with men in D.C. Fitz tries to remove her from the podium, but Olivia tells him that she needs to be the public villain, and by allowing Abby to throw her under the bus she is choosing Fitz.
73	4	"Dog-Whistle Politics"	Zetna Fuentes	Mark Fish	October 15, 2015	504	8.06
Eager to get answers, Jake takes Charlie to Paris and unexpectedly crosses paths with someone he thought he'd never see again, his wife Elise. It is revealed that they were going to meet at a train station to be together, but it didn't work out. After she gets shot he brings her to the U.S. Olivia visits Jake and is surprised by there being another woman in his apartment. Meanwhile, Huck and Quinn recruit Marcus Walker to help smooth over the media storm surrounding Olivia. They do interviews where they claim the media has been using dog-whistle politics against Olivia. Fitz quickly finds out the true cost of mercy when he works to stop the Senate from impeaching him. Despite the current scandal, Fitz surprises Olivia at her apartment and takes her on a date. Mellie, seeing their date goes to the women's caucus to tell them she is on board to impeach Fitz.
74	5	"You Got Served"	Kevin Bray	Zahir McGhee	October 22, 2015	505	8.28
In the oval office Fitz asks what specifically he has done that is cause for impeachment. David responds that grounds for impeachment are not set in stone, and that they are whatever Congress decides at any given moment. He suggests a controversial lawyer to Fitz and warns him that he cannot speak to Olivia about the case. Olivia knows she can't handle this latest storm on her own and calls for help from an unexpected source, Leo Bergen. His plan is transform the media's perception of the affair from tawdry to the greatest true love story. Olivia declines and says she wants to appear charitable instead. To sell the story Leo declares they need a character witness to speak on TV: Edison Davis. Olivia goes to his house to convince him to speak on her behalf. After they argue, he agrees. Fitz's lawyer orders that a vast amount of paper documents be dumped for the committee to sort through for evidence. Mellie is forced to recuse herself from the investigation, but before she does she leaks that Fitz gave Olivia a ring. That forces Leo to shift the story back to greatest love story. Cyrus is chilling at home on the couch, eating and watching it all unfold on TV. Mellie joins him and asks him to work for her. Olivia visits Jake, and is surprised to see his wife, Elise, there as well. Olivia gives an emotional interview on TV, which Fitz sees. The committee approaches Marcus and asks him to spy on OPA, letting Olivia know that the committee has her tape from when she was kidnapped. Fitz and Olivia know that Cyrus is the only person who can corroborate that Fitz saw the tape so Fitz invites him to the white house. They make a deal: Fitz gives Cyrus a job in the White House and Cyrus doesn't reveal that Fitz knew Olivia was kidnapped.
75	6	"Get Out of Jail, Free"	Chandra Wilson	Chris Van Dusen	October 29, 2015	506	7.80
Mellie is ambushed by the questioning Senators at the hearing. Fitz and Olivia are presented with a shocking plan to get married, which will allow them to not testify against each other. Fitz proposes to Olivia on the White House balcony surrounded by candles and rose petals, but Olivia says its not what she wants because she's not ready. Elise visits Rowan in prison and he is later attacked by a guard and ends up in the hospital, Elise tells Jake she's plotting to get him killed as part of Lazarus One. Rowan offers to make the Senate Committee go away if she gets him out of prison. Olivia proposes to Mellie that she release him through her position as Senator of Virginia so both of their problems will go away, but Mellie refuses because she knows he was the one who killed the grand jurors. Olivia tells her that Rowan was the one who killed her son. Meanwhile, the Gladiators continue to defend Olivia at the Senate Hearing (whilst working to avoid purjuring themselves). Susan Ross turns to David for advice to resign as Vice President because she doesn't want to have to be president but David tells her she won't need to but if she did have to she would be good at it. Olivia eventually agrees to a simple ceremony where she keeps her own name. Jake tells Elise he wants to go with her and help her on her mission, but he finds her dead at the train station where they were meant to meet. Mellie finally signs the divorce papers after confronting Fitz about their lives together. Just as Olivia and Fitz were about to get married, Olivia gets a call from Mellie telling her she can help her become President. The Senators are presented with blackmail from Rowan, who Mellie has freed.
76	7	"Even the Devil Deserves a Second Chance"	Oliver Bokelberg	Raamla Mohamed	November 5, 2015	507	8.03
While Fitz is focused on winning back the American people, he makes a shocking discovery. Meanwhile, OPA takes on a new client, but Olivia seems preoccupied keeping her own secrets, and Elizabeth North sets her sights on a new agenda.
77	8	"Rasputin"	John Terlesky	Paul William Davies	November 12, 2015	508	7.70
In the midst of Fitz negotiating a historic peace deal, Olivia must rely on her instincts when a guest of the White House discloses powerful intel. Meanwhile, Jake uses Huck's help to get closer to his target, and Cyrus takes matters into his own hands when he realizes he's been shut out of the inner circle.
78	9	"Baby, It's Cold Outside"	Tom Verica	Mark Wilding	November 19, 2015	509	8.13
Olivia is feeling more and more frustrated as she must take on "First Lady" type responsibilities at the White House. Olivia has an abortion. Meanwhile, Mellie proves just how powerful she can be and Jake and Huck continue the hunt for Rowan. Olivia misses Fitz's dinner due to her abortion, and Fitz and Olivia break up. They agree that they tried but their relationship didn't work.
79	10	"It's Hard Out Here for a General"	Tom Verica	Severiano Canales	February 11, 2016	510	6.96
Six months after Olivia and Fitz have broken up, both of them are handling their newfound freedom in very different ways. Olivia and Jake begin sleeping together again without talking to each other, while Abby becomes Fitz's "work-wife" – much to her dismay. Meanwhile, Pope and Associates take on a case by the head of the NSA that could lead to a national crisis, and Mellie asks Olivia to run her presidential campaign.
80	11	"The Candidate"	Allison Liddi-Brown	Alison Schapker	February 18, 2016	511A	6.09
Mellie and Olivia work together to write Mellie's book about running for President with several secrets about the two's relationships with Fitz being revealed between them. Elizabeth tries to convince Susan Ross to run for the presidency, while Abby and Cyrus have different views on the reporter that is writing a profile piece on Fitz about his last period in Office.
81	12	"Wild Card"	Allison Liddi-Brown & Tom Verica	Mark Fish	February 25, 2016	511B	5.85
While Fitz is preoccupied with Lillian, Cyrus begins to orchestrate his next master plan with another candidate who's running for President, Francisco Vargas, by making him known to the public. Elizabeth North uses David to get Susan Ross to run for President, and Olivia questions Jake's motives for being the new head of the NSA.
82	13	"The Fish Rots from the Head"	Sharat Raju	Heather Mitchell	March 10, 2016	512	5.97
Abby calls in Olivia and her team to help cover up an accidental murder by the Secret Service, but Marcus has doubts about the situation. At the same time, Abby struggles with keeping Fitz's new hobby of sleeping with different women a secret, while Cyrus continues his plan with Governor Vargas leading him to be hired to run Vargas' presidential campaign. Jake announces that he is engaged to his new girlfriend, much to the dismay of Olivia.
83	14	"I See You"	Paris Barclay	Matt Byrne	March 17, 2016	513	6.31
Huck becomes worried for his family after recognizing his ex-wife's new boyfriend as one of the people he tortured. He kidnaps him, leading Olivia, Quinn and Marcus to look for him. Meanwhile, both Mellie and Susan try to get Hollis as a sponsor for their campaign, but it results with Hollis announcing his run for President. Olivia becomes suspicious about Jake, and figures out that he is doing the same thing to his fiancé as he did to her in the beginning of their relationship. Abby discovers that Cyrus has been working with the Vargas campaign, and fires him and takes over the job as Chief of Staff in the White House.
84	15	"Pencils Down"	Regina King	Chris Van Dusen	March 24, 2016	514	6.15
After Sally Langston announces that she will hold the first Republican debate, the presidential candidates prepare themselves. Olivia tries to make Mellie "a woman of the people" in the media, but Mellie makes a very public faux pas – leading Olivia to try and fix it. Susan practices her debate skills while at the same time dealing with news of David cheating on her with Elizabeth, leading her to end their relationship. Meanwhile, Quinn learns valuable intel from Jake's fiancée, which turns out to be that Rowan and Jake are funding Edison's presidential campaign. Cyrus gets outplayed by Vargas' brother in handling the campaign.
85	16	"The Miseducation of Susan Ross"	Scott Foley	Raamla Mohamed	March 31, 2016	516	6.44
Susan wins the Republican debate over Mellie and Hollis. After losing, the candidates begin to act in order to get ahead in the election. Mellie appears on Jimmy Kimmel Live! reading Mean-Tweets to establish a more down-to-earth persona in the media, while Susan does a sit-down interview with David proclaiming their love for each other. Olivia goes too far when trying to get dirt on Susan, leading Quinn to ask Abby and Fitz for help. Cyrus gets more trust from Senator Vargas after his brother Alex fails when he leaks Edison's secret about being in rehab.
86	17	"Thwack!"	Tony Goldwyn	Zahir McGhee	April 7, 2016	517	5.88
Former Vice-President Andrew Nichols threatens to reveal to the media that Fitz went to war for Olivia, risking to take them all down. Olivia works with Fitz to try and pay him off, but he refuses. After he insults Olivia, she goes to extreme measures to keep him quiet by beating him to death with a chair. Meanwhile, Abby struggles with her new position as Olivia tries to take control of the situation. It leads to Abby betraying Olivia by making Lillian the reporter to write about Mellie rather than Andrew.
87	18	"Till Death Do Us Part"	Steph Green	Paul William Davies	April 21, 2016	518	6.00
After killing Andrew, Olivia stays with Rowan and Jake. While faking her depression, Olivia discovers Rowan's plan to get Jake elected Vice President with Edison by marrying him to Vanessa. Jake and Olivia however reconcile and plan to escape together. However when Rowan threatens to kill Jake if he chooses Olivia, Olivia breaks up with him and Jake marries Vanessa. Meanwhile, through flashbacks, Jake's backstory of his childhood and training at B613 is revealed.
88	19	"Buckle Up"	Oliver Bokelberg	Michelle Lirtzman	April 28, 2016	519	6.25
The Republican presidential candidates travel to Florida to get an endorsement from Governor Baker, which would lock up enough delegates to secure a commanding lead in the campaign. Abby stalls Mellie's plane from going off so she can be late. Mellie takes matter into her own hands and talks to Fitz about it on the tarmac, where he reveals to her that Olivia killed Andrew. Meanwhile, David is caught in a dilemma when Governor Baker offers to give her endorsement to Susan if he drops the investigation into a sugar company she took kickbacks from. David takes the deal, and Susan gets the endorsement. However, Hollis Doyle is the one who wins Florida. Cyrus deals with Michael, which ends with Michael leaving Cyrus and taking Ella with him.
89	20	"Trump Card"	Jann Turner	Severiano Canales & Jess Brownell	May 5, 2016	520	6.06
Olivia and Abby have to put aside their differences and work together to try to take down Hollis Doyle. David proposes to Susan, and she accepts. In the meantime, Edison realizes that he might have just made a deal with the devil as Rowan and Jake continue to try and pull the strings behind Edison's campaign.
90	21	"That's My Girl"	Tom Verica	Shonda Rhimes & Mark Wilding	May 12, 2016	521	6.65
On Rowan's orders Jake kills his new father-in-law. Cyrus suggests that David should be Frankie's running mate, but Rowan suggests Jake instead. Edison passes Jake's message to Olivia, and she wonders if she can help him. Abby accidentally lets Fitz read Olivia's medical records, revealing her abortion to him. Mellie stands up to Fitz when he proposes giving a speech entirely about himself at her campaign rally. Olivia announces that Jake will be Mellie's running mate, allowing her to release Jake from her dad's control. She goes to the oval office to meet with Fitz. Jake tells Olivia that he doesn't want to be Mellie's VP, but that he wants a happy life with Liv. Jake realizes that Rowan has succeeded in getting both himself and Olivia to the White House. Much to everyone's surprise, Cyrus is announced as Frankie's VP pick.

== Reception ==
The review aggregator website Rotten Tomatoes reports a 95% approval rating with an average rating of 7.80/10 based on 20 reviews. The website's consensus reads, "Increased pressure on a key couple brings heightened stakes and more exciting twists to Scandal's action-packed, consistently gripping fifth season.

=== Live + SD Ratings ===
No. in series	No. in season	Episode	Air date	Time slot (EST)	Rating/Share (18–49)	Viewers (m)	18–49 Rank	Viewership rank	Drama rank
70	1	"Heavy is the Head"	September 24, 2015	Thursdays; 9:00 p.m.	3.3/10	10.25	8	16	2
71	2	"Yes"	October 1, 2015	Thursdays; 9:00 p.m.	2.8/9	9.12	10	21	2
72	3	"Paris is Burning"	October 8, 2015	Thursdays; 9:00 p.m.	2.6/8	8.76	10	22	2
73	4	"Dog-Whistle Politics"	October 15, 2015	Thursdays; 9:00 p.m.	2.4/7	8.06	11	21	2
74	5	"You Got Served"	October 22, 2015	Thursdays; 9:00 p.m.	2.5/8	8.28	11	23	2
75	6	"Get Out of Jail, Free"	October 29, 2015	Thursdays; 9:00 p.m.	2.3/7	7.80	14	30	2
76	7	"Even the Devil Deserves a Second Chance"	November 5, 2015	Thursdays; 9:00 p.m.	2.2/7	8.03	13	25	4
77	8	"Rasputin"	November 12, 2015	Thursdays; 9:00 p.m.	2.2/7	7.70	14	28	6
78	9	"Baby, It's Cold Outside"	November 19, 2015	Thursdays; 9:00 p.m.	2.4/8	8.13	11	23	3
79	10	"It's Hard Out Here for a General"	February 11, 2016	Thursdays; 9:00 p.m.	2.1/7	6.96	9	28	4
80	11	"The Candidate"	February 18, 2016	Thursdays; 9:00 p.m.	1.8/5	6.09	18	33	5
81	12	"Wild Card"	February 25, 2016	Thursdays; 9:00 p.m.	1.7/5	5.85	22	37	6
82	13	"The Fish Rots from the Head"	March 10, 2016	Thursdays; 9:00 p.m.	1.7/6	5.97	15	28	3
83	14	"I See You"	March 17, 2016	Thursdays; 9:00 p.m.	1.6/5	6.31	23	—N/a	5
84	15	"Pencil's Down"	March 24, 2016	Thursdays; 9:00 p.m.	1.6/5	6.15	20	—N/a	5
85	16	"The Miseducation of Susan Ross"	March 31, 2016	Thursdays; 9:00 p.m.	1.7/6	6.44	13	25	4
86	17	"Thwack!"	April 7, 2016	Thursdays; 9:00 p.m.	1.7/5	5.88	15	—N/a	5
87	18	"Till Death Do Us Part"	April 21, 2016	Thursdays; 9:00 p.m.	1.5/5	6.00	16	—N/a	8
88	19	"Buckle Up"	April 28, 2016	Thursdays; 9:00 p.m.	1.6/5	6.25	17	—N/a	6
89	20	"Trump Card"	May 5, 2016	Thursdays; 9:00 p.m.	1.5/5	6.06	21	—N/a	8
90	21	"That's My Girl"	May 12, 2016	Thursdays; 9:00 p.m.	1.8/6	6.65	10	—N/a	4

=== Live + 7 Day (DVR) ratings ===
No. in series	No. in season	Episode	Air date	Time slot (EST)	18–49 rating increase	Viewers (millions) increase	Total 18-49	Total viewers (millions)	Ref
70	1	"Heavy is the Head"	September 24, 2015	Thursdays; 9:00 p.m.	1.8	4.49	5.1	14.73	
71	2	"Yes"	October 1, 2015	Thursdays; 9:00 p.m.	1.9	4.52	4.7	13.63	
72	3	"Paris is Burning"	October 8, 2015	Thursdays; 9:00 p.m.	1.6	3.90	4.2	12.66	
73	4	"Dog-Whistle Politics"	October 15, 2015	Thursdays; 9:00 p.m.	1.7	4.16	4.1	12.22	
75	5	"You Got Served"	October 22, 2015	Thursdays; 9:00 p.m.	1.4	3.66	3.9	11.95	
75	6	"Get Out of Jail, Free"	October 29, 2015	Thursdays; 9:00 p.m.	1.4	3.53	3.7	11.33	
76	7	"Even the Devil Deserves a Second Chance"	November 5, 2015	Thursdays; 9:00 p.m.	1.7	3.99	3.9	12.02	
77	8	"Rasputin"	November 12, 2015	Thursdays; 9:00 p.m.	1.6	3.88	3.8	11.58	
78	9	"Baby, It's Cold Outside"	November 19, 2015	Thursdays; 9:00 p.m.	1.5	3.78	3.9	11.91	
79	10	"It's Hard Out Here for a General"	February 11, 2016	Thursdays; 9:00 p.m.	1.5	3.73	3.6	10.68	
80	11	"The Candidate"	February 18, 2016	Thursdays; 9:00 p.m.	1.4	3.61	3.2	9.70	
81	12	"Wild Card"	February 25, 2016	Thursdays; 9:00 p.m.	1.3	3.40	3.0	9.23	
82	13	"The Fish Rots from the Head"	March 10, 2016	Thursdays; 9:00 p.m.	1.5	3.66	3.2	9.65	
83	14	"I See You"	March 17, 2016	Thursdays; 9:00 p.m.	1.4	3.42	3.0	9.73	
84	15	"Pencil's Down"	March 24, 2016	Thursdays; 9:00 p.m.	1.3	3.32	2.9	9.46	
85	16	"The Miseducation of Susan Ross"	March 31, 2016	Thursdays; 9:00 p.m.	1.3	3.44	3.0	9.72	
86	17	"Thwack!"	April 7, 2016	Thursdays; 9:00 p.m.	1.3	3.51	3.0	9.39	
87	18	"Till Death Do Us Part"	April 21, 2016	Thursdays; 9:00 p.m.	1.3	3.28	2.8	9.27	
88	19	"Buckle Up"	April 28, 2016	Thursdays; 9:00 p.m.	1.3	3.19	2.9	9.45	
89	20	"Trump Card"	May 5, 2016	Thursdays; 9:00 p.m.	—N/a	—N/a	—N/a	—N/a	—N/a
90	21	"That's My Girl"	May 12, 2016	Thursdays; 9:00 p.m.	—N/a	—N/a	—N/a	—N/a	—N/a

== Awards and nominations ==
Award	Category	Nominee	Result
People's Choice Award	Favorite Network TV Drama	Scandal	Nominated
People's Choice Award	Favorite Dramatic TV Actress	Kerry Washington	Nominated
People's Choice Award	Favorite Dramatic TV Actor	Scott Foley	Nominated
NAACP Image Award	Outstanding Drama Series	Scandal	Nominated
NAACP Image Award	Outstanding Actress in a Drama Series	Kerry Washington	Nominated
NAACP Image Award	Outstanding Supporting Actor in a Drama Series	Joe Morton	Won
NAACP Image Award	Outstanding Supporting Actor in a Drama Series	Guillermo Diaz	Nominated
Teen Choice Award	Choice TV Actress – Drama	Kerry Washington	Nominated

== DVD release ==
The Complete Fifth Season
Set details	Special features
21 episodes; 5-disc set; 904 minutes; English (Dolby Digital 5.1 Surround); English SDH, Spanish and French subtitles	Extended Episodes; Bloopers & Mistakes
Release dates
Region 1	Region 2
August 23, 2016	November 23, 2016
