= Dog-Whistle Politics (Scandal) =

- Scandal episode
- Episode no.: Season 5 Episode 4
- Directed by: Zetna Fuentes
- Written by: Mark Fish
- Production code: 504
- Original air date: October 15, 2015

Guest appearances
- Mia Maestro as Elise Martin; John Prosky as Senator Stanley Gibson; Rose Abdoo as Senator Linda Moskowitz

Episode chronology
← Previous "Paris is Burning"	Next → "You Got Served"
- Scandal (season 5)

"Dog-Whistle Politics" is the fourth episode of the fifth season, and the 73rd overall of the American political thriller television series Scandal. It aired on October 15, 2015 on American Broadcasting accompany (ABC) in the United States. The episode was written by Mark Fish and directed by Zetna Fuentes.

== Plot ==
After learning that the Louvre was on fire, Jake Ballard (Scott Foley) becomes immediately suspicious about Rowan (Joe Morton) trying to rebuild his empire B613 through Lazarus One which the first step was destroying the work of art museums and disrupting the market of artworks. Jake goes to see Rowan in prison for answers, where the ancient command denies any knowledge about it. Jake decided to continue his investigation and goes to France with Charlie, but he unexpectedly crosses paths with someone he thought he'd never see again.

In the meantime, Olivia Pope (Kerry Washington), after confirming to the press that she is the President's mistress, is lying low. Fitz (Tony Goldwyn), tries to deal with the Republican senators and their threat about impeachment.

Meanwhile, Quinn Perkins (Katie Lowes) recruits Marcus Walker (Cornelius Smith Jr.), a former client of OPA to help smooth over the media storm surrounding Olivia and Fitz. But when it becomes clear that the media, who are digging up dirt on Olivia, won’t back down, Marcus, Huck and Quinn come up with a plan to handle the press. They employ a strategy called Dog-whistle politics which is a language, a type of political speech using code words that appear to mean one thing to the general population but have a different meaning for a targeted part of the audience.

Mellie Grant (Bellamy Young) is asked by female senators to join them in their bid to impeach the president. At first, she refuses to join this path, but later agrees to join them after seeing Fitz making his relationship with Olivia public.

== Production ==
The episode was written by Zetna Fuentes and directed by Mark Fish. The episode featured the songs "Scandal End Credits Theme" by Chad Fischer; "Satisfaction" by Aretha Franklin, and "Signed, Sealed, Delivered I'm Yours" by Stevie Wonder.

== Reception ==
=== Broadcasting ===
"Dog-Whistle Politics" was originally broadcast on Thursday, October 15, 2015 in the United States on ABC. The episode's total viewership was 8.06 million. In the key 18-49 demographic, the episode scored a 2.4/7 in Nielsen ratings, the highest rating. The show rank 11th on 18-49 Rank and 2nd in Drama Rank.

=== Critical reception ===
The episode was well received by television critics, with many praising. Entertainment Weekly praised the episode saying: "Scandal was firing all cylinders tonight: we had some really sweet Liv-Fitz moments, some angry and compassionate sides of Mellie, some slick OPA problem-solving, two new faces, a scary Papa pope speech, and drama Galore!" Huffington Post also congratulate the show as they said "Scandal has nailed the degrading way women of color are discussed: Lucky, sassy, ambitious, well-spoken, shrill, calculating, urban."

Time listed "Dog-Whistle Politics" as No. 3 on their Top 10 Best TV Episodes of 2015.
