= Scandal season 7 =

Season of American television series Scandal

Scandal
- Season 7
- Promotional poster
- Starring: Kerry Washington; Scott Foley; Darby Stanchfield; Katie Lowes; Guillermo Diaz; Jeff Perry; Joshua Malina; Bellamy Young; Joe Morton; George Newbern; Cornelius Smith Jr.; Tony Goldwyn
- No. of episodes: 18

Release
- Original network: ABC
- Original release: October 5, 2017 – April 19, 2018

Season chronology
- ← Previous; Season 6

The seventh and final season of the American drama television series Scandal was broadcast between October 5, 2017, and April 19, 2018, consisting of 18 episodes. It was ordered by the American Broadcasting Company (ABC) on February 10, 2017, and later announced to be the series' last season. After recurring appearances in the previous six seasons, George Newbern was upgraded to a series regular for the seventh installment. The season was produced by ABC Studios, in association with ShondaLand Production Company, with Shonda Rhimes acting as showrunner.

The season focuses on Olivia Pope and her new position as Chief of Staff of President Mellie Grant and the Command of B613. It also depicts Quinn Perkins as the boss of her crisis management firm Quinn Perkins & Associates, and its team, as well as staff at the White House in Washington, D.C., in their efforts to deal with and contain political scandals. Season seven had have twelve series regulars, all returning from the previous season, out of which six are part of the original cast of eight regulars from the first season. The season aired on Thursday nights at 9:00 pm until episode 15, where it aired in its original timeslot, Thursday 10:00 pm.

== Cast and characters ==
=== Main ===
- Kerry Washington as Chief of Staff Olivia Pope
- Scott Foley as Jake Ballard
- Darby Stanchfield as Abby Whelan
- Katie Lowes as Quinn Perkins
- Guillermo Diaz as Diego "Huck" Muñoz
- Jeff Perry as Vice President Cyrus Beene
- Joshua Malina as David Rosen
- Bellamy Young as President Mellie Grant
- Joe Morton as Elijah "Eli"/"Rowan" Pope
- George Newbern as Charlie
- Cornelius Smith Jr. as Marcus Walker
- Tony Goldwyn as President Fitzgerald "Fitz" Thomas Grant III

=== Recurring ===
- Jay Hernandez as Curtis Pryce
- Faran Tahir as President Rashad
- Shaun Toub as Ambassador Marashi
- Dean Norris as Fenton Glackland
- Whitney Hice as Hannah
- Michael O'Neill as Lonnie Mencken

=== Guest stars ===
- Bess Armstrong as Senator Diane Greenwald
- Caroline Day as Lucy Riccio
- Medalion Rahimi as Yasmeen
- Viola Davis as Annalise Keating
- Aja Naomi King as Michaela Pratt
- Tom Irwin as Justice Spivey
- Khandi Alexander as Maya Lewis
- Jessalyn Gilsig as Vanessa Ballard
- Kate Burton as Sally Langston
- Gregg Henry as Hollis Doyle
- Tom Amandes as Samuel Reston
- Brian Letscher as Tom Larsen

== Episodes ==
No. overall	No. in season	Title	Directed by	Written by	Original release date	Prod. code	U.S. viewers (millions)
107	1	"Watch Me"	Jann Turner	Shonda Rhimes	October 5, 2017	701	5.52
The episode begins with a montage depicting Luna's death and Cyrus's rise to the vice-presidency. Jake still has a cabinet position, and is still with Olivia. Olivia works with Cyrus and Mellie to get passed a bill that offers free college education to American citizens while QPA staff battle to find their first client. Olivia's and Jake's uncommitted relationship turns flamboyant when power rises to Olivia's head and she begins to treat him as an employee. Cyrus thinks about becoming the next president, but his ideas fade after Mellie declares how grateful she is for all he has done. Olivia is interviewed by Curtis Pryce and the two end up in an affair. Mellie deals with a situation where a U.S. CIA agent is being held by terrorists in Bashran. Grant can't convince Ambassador Marachi, and Olivia threatens him in exchange of the citizen's return to American soil.
108	2	"Pressing the Flesh"	Tony Goldwyn	Matt Byrne	October 12, 2017	702	5.00
The White House prepares a dinner to welcome the President of Bashran, during which Mellie talks to him to try to reach an agreement on the possession of nuclear weapons in his country through a treaty. Olivia asks Jake to investigate President Rashad and he finds out that Rashad sent his niece to study at a university in the United States, which sounds completely different from what he advocates in his country filled with anti-American people. Olivia threatens him with the information, but the President claims to have expected something like that, saying that his ambassador had warned him that Olivia was "the devil." QPA gets an invitation to the dinner, where they try to socialize with high-profile people and hopefully gather possible scandals. Huck discovers that one of the military men at dinner is actually a killer but is stopped by agents, quickly advised by Olivia, Huck, and Abby. Later, Rashad reveals to Mellie that radicals of his country may be responsible, convincing him to accept the treaty. Curtis Pryce also attends the dinner, and he follows Olivia until she asks him to go to her loft. Arriving there, they run into Fitz, who is expecting Olivia.
109	3	"Day 101"	Scott Foley	Zahir McGhee	October 19, 2017	703	4.70
Marcus asks Fitz how he would like to have Olivia featured in his Presidential library. Fitz is frustrated with the idea of his Presidency being reduced to him just being a man who loved a woman. After spending time with Fitz, Marcus finds him entitled and intolerable. Marcus states Fitz's accomplishments are actually Olivia's. He is close to quitting when Mellie assures him he is just going through the stages of Fitz and the best part is yet to come. Meanwhile, Fitz gets a startling visit from Rowan who needs help trying to handle Olivia. Rowan informs Fitz that Olivia is command. As Olivia and Curtis arrive at Olivia's door to spend the night together they find Fitz waiting.
110	4	"Lost Girls"	Nicole Rubio	Ameni Rozsa & Austin Guzman	October 26, 2017	704	4.88
At Olivia's door Fitz asks her to help him with a project to find missing girls. She tells him to contact QPA— where they find trouble in identifying the poster girl for the missing girls. They later have one of the missing girls' mother start making public statements. Cyrus debates what to do with the painting from Fenton Glackland, prompting him to return it. With his concern over Olivia's power hunger, Rowan warns her that she can't have it all. At a summit, the prime minister of Dacal isn't willing to work with Mellie or Rashad. Mellie and Rashad have a drink together in the oval and have a romantic connection.—arousing Olivia's concerns. Bashran is taken in coup, stripping off Rashad's presidency. Jake tells Olivia that she needs to choose whether or not she is Command. Mellie wants to send in troops to Bashran to help Rashad, but Olivia is against it. Jake gives Olivia information on what Rowan has been up to.
111	5	"Adventures in Babysitting"	Oliver Bokelberg	Serveriano Canales & Tia Napolitano	November 2, 2017	705	4.89
Olivia and Mellie push their power like never before, coming up with a plan to pit both Bashran rebel groups against each other. Before that can be enacted Fitz reveals to Mellie that Olivia is in command and that she killed vice president Luna Vargas. Despite the revelation, Mellie goes along with Olivia's plan in hopes of restoring peace with Bashran. Mellie demands that Fitz go back to Vermont, but he refuses. Cyrus works on a congressional approval to declare war in Bashran as QPA keeps a close watch on President Rashad’s niece, Yasmeen. Yasmeen and Rashad board a plane to return to Bashran, but before it can take off the plane explodes.
112	6	"Vampires and Bloodsuckers"	Jann Turner	Chris Van Dusen & Tia Napolitano	November 9, 2017	706	5.00
Olivia informs Mellie of Rashad's death, and she immediately wants to send troops into Bashran. Glackland and Cyrus have brunch while Glackland pressures Cyrus for information on what's going on in the White House. Quinn gets ready for her wedding and then meets with Olivia and accuses her of being behind Rashad's death. Huck fusses over Quinn and Charlie's wedding as he is both best man and maid of honor. Meanwhile, Quinn is missing and Olivia is worried that Quinn is going to tell that Olivia is behind Rashad's death. Charlie insists that Quinn didn't get cold feet so QPA starts looking for her. Olivia and Jake work to throw off QPA's search for Quinn by planning to blame it on Glackland. Charlie, convinced that Glackland has Quinn, captures and tortures him, but Huck stops him before he can cut off Glackland's arm. Mellie calls the new regime in Bashran and tells them that America will work with them for peace, under Mellie's terms. Jake and Olivia look at footage of Quinn arriving to her wedding, meaning that she didn't bail to build a case against Olivia, but that she was kidnapped.
113	7	"Something Borrowed"	Sharat Raju	Mark Fish	November 16, 2017	707	4.97
At dinner Rowan reveals to Olivia that he has Quinn, and wants to exchange Quinn's life for his freedom and dinosaur bones. Marcus tries to convince Mellie to work with Fitz's foundation on mass incarceration. During a dispute with his daughter, Rowan leaves his living room and gun shots are heard, leaving Olivia to believe Quinn is dead.
114	8	"Robin"	Daryn Okada	Juan Carlos Fernandez	January 18, 2018	709	5.17
Rowan has a body in a car which he burns. He calls the police to report a fire. QPA and Olivia gets word of Quinn's death. Her DNA was found in a tooth from the car fire, along with a burned piece of her wedding dress. Charlie wants to have Quinn cremated and packed into bullet cases. Huck reads through the coroner's report and finds out about the hairpin from the Smithsonian Olivia gave Quinn. Fitz comes to Olivia's apartment to offer his condolences, but Olivia pushes him off, telling him that they aren't friends. Glackland breaks up with Cyrus thinking that Charlie was Cyrus' hitman. Meanwhile, The gladiators say goodbye to Quinn as each of them says something about Quinn and then fires one of her bullets into the ground. Emotional and still drunk, Olivia goes to Fitz's apartment and they have sex. David and Abby rid Charlie's apartment of baby stuff where they find a hidden flashdrive. Charlie arrives at Rowan's door and implore his ex chief to make him a soldier impervious to pain again; while leaving he hears a baby crying. He runs up to the second floor of Rowan's house to find a baby girl, and then starts choking Rowan asking who is the baby.
115	9	"Good People"	Nzingha Stewart	Shonda Rhimes, Jess Brownell & Nicholas Nardini	January 25, 2018	708	5.19
This episode is a flashback to the events that occurred from Quinn's point of view from her abduction to the end of episode 8 where Charlie discovers the baby girl in Rowan's home. Rowan goes to a store to buy a suitcase and makes a friend in one of the employees, Marvin. He kidnaps Quinn from the QPA elevator and puts her in his basement. He goes to dinner with Olivia and says he will trade Quinn for his dinosaur bones, but she declines. Rowan heads to the store and buys a crib, again making conversation with Marvin. They meet in a pub where they have dinner, and Marvin offers Rowan his employee discount. Meanwhile, down in the basement Quinn hallucinates that her colleagues are talking to her. Rowan uses Marvin's employee discount to buy a gun, making it registered in Marvin's name. Olivia arrives at Rowan's home and he barters Quinn for his bones again; overhearing the dispute, Quinn also hears Olivia choose her power over saving Quinn.
116	10	"The People v. Olivia Pope"	Kerry Washington	Ameni Rozsa	February 1, 2018	710	5.62
A distraught Olivia spends the night with Fitz and leads to her agreeing to go with him to Vermont. Once there, she discovers her closest friends are there as well. Olivia is confronted on her role in Quinn and Rashad's deaths. She locks herself in a bedroom as her friends each provide evidence and reasoning why she should step down from her role, offering her an out if she agrees to give up B613. Olivia provides a single-paged statement of resignation from her Chief of Staff role in the White House and alludes to Jake being placed in control of shutting down B613. The crew fly back to Washington and watch the evening's televised press brief for Olivia's formal resignation statement.
117	11	"Army of One"	Allison Liddi-Brown	Austin Guzman	February 8, 2018	711	4.63
Olivia confronts Mellie on her decision to name Jake as her new Chief of Staff; Mellie tells Olivia that she must step down and resign, or be publicly terminated. QPA gains a new client, a government employee being accused of treason with Russian entities. The crew discovers he is in an affair with Jake's wife upon Olivia leaking the information to the media. Cyrus gives Mellie and Jake a way to frame Olivia and spin her media story, but backstabs them when he provides Olivia with the documents proving the President's media coverup—offering her the papers to bring down the Mellie presidency during her scheduled resignation announcement, but instead brings this information to light with Mellie as she is preparing for the first Presidential Mammogram. Quinn bargains with Rowan for her freedom in exchange for not going after Olivia. Olivia returns home where Quinn shows herself and holds her at gunpoint. Olivia warns Quinn of snipers and continuing to not believe the threat, Olivia is shot in the arm attempting to protect Quinn. Olivia gives her speech at a press conference, initially planning to use the files from Cyrus but instead giving her resignation. Charlie, Quinn, Robin, Huck and Abby reunite.
118	12	"Allow Me to Reintroduce Myself"	Tony Goldwyn	Raamla Mohamed	March 1, 2018	712	4.95
After her dismissal from the White House, Olivia serves as a guest lecturer at a local university. Annalise Keating, a defense attorney, asks for her help with her class action. At first, Olivia turns down the offer due to the questionable reputation of Annalise, but softens up shortly after. The duo get in touch with Fitz in order to gain mileage. Meanwhile, Mellie and Jake try their best to postpone, if not sabotage, the case through QPA, leaking the reason Olivia lost her post as Chief of Staff. With everything seeming to hit a dead end, Olivia and Annalise decide to work by themselves without any help from the White House. After watching a televised interview of Olivia and Annalise, Quinn has a change of heart, offering the "dirt" she has on Justice Spivey and prompting her to persuade (possibly blackmail) the judge into changing his vote. The class action suit is added to the court docket, much to Mellie's dismay. This episode begins a crossover event that concludes on How to Get Away with Murder season 4 episode 13.
119	13	"Air Force Two"	Valerie Weiss	Severiano Canales	March 8, 2018	713	4.67
David and Cyrus are on a plane to the Summit when it gets hacked. One of the White House staffers admits that her laptop was stolen and that she accidentally brought the malware onto the plane. Finding a way to get Wi-Fi on the plane, David sends a message to QPA asking for help. Olivia visits Maya, and attempts to celebrate her birthday. Mellie is faced with the decision of whether or not to shoot down the plane per protocol. She is worried that Jake is acting based on his hate of Cyrus. Much to Olivia's dismay, her visit with Maya doesn't bring her any closer to her. As a birthday present, Olivia gets Maya out of jail and gives her a trench coat and a plane ticket to France, as well as enough money to live off of. QPA figures out a way to save the plane. After getting off the plane David goes to Abby, who thought he was going to propose to her. He then tells her he isn't because he knows her and he knows that marriage would make her unhappy.
120	14	"The List"	Greg Evans	Jess Brownell & Juan Carlos Fernandez	March 15, 2018	714	4.74
A man shows up asking Olivia to help him find his missing daughter Alisha, who idolizes Olivia. Alisha, a congressional intern, found herself on a list of interns that won't sleep with congressman. Because of her placement on the list she wouldn't be able to get a job. Her father blames Olivia for inspiring her to work in D.C., accusing her of sleeping her way to the top. Olivia finds Alisha's housemate, who did sleep with a congressman, and got a job because of it. Olivia convinces her to give a press conference exposing the congressman responsible. In light of Olivia's case, Mellie plans to introduce legislation addressing sexual harassment. Jake expresses a romantic interest in Mellie, but she turns him down. Fitz asks Olivia if she thinks that he crossed the line when they first got together, and she responds that they both crossed the line together. QPA looks into who hijacked the plane, trying to find evidence that Cyrus is responsible. But when Quinn finds out that Olivia was the one who asked Abby to look into Cyrus she orders QPA to stop investigating. The FBI arrest Charlie for the hijacking, leading QPA to believe that he is being framed.
121	15	"The Noise"	Darby Stanchfield	Raamla Mohamed & Jeremy Gordon	March 29, 2018	715	3.71
Charlie is taken into custody by the FBI; Lonnie Mencken tries to persuade him to sign a confession to frame Mellie as the mastermind behind the hijacking of Air Force Two—getting immunity in exchange of his corporation—but he brushes him off. QPA with Fitz's help, try to expedite a solution to have Charlie released. Cyrus tries to blackmail Quinn to convince Charlie into signing the deal but Olivia thinks that it may be a bad idea that might destroy Mellie's presidency. Quinn later declines Cyrus' offer. Fitz tries to warn Mellie on Cyrus' plans but she does not believe him. Cyrus makes an ally out of Jake by promising a position once he takes over the presidency. Jake manages to convince Charlie to sign the confession, putting Mellie in the center of the scandal by threatening to harm his family. Mellie is issued with a subpoena, realizing that Cyrus must have framed her. Mellie pleads Jake for help in silencing Cyrus but he flatly refuses, confirming his allegiance to Cyrus. Mellie reinstates Olivia as command and orders her to have Cyrus killed.
122	16	"People Like Me"	Joe Morton	Chris Van Dusen	April 5, 2018	716	3.83
Olivia, reluctant to kill Cyrus, devises a plan to either convince Cyrus to drop his evil plans against Mellie or kill him if the other plan fails. Huck gravely against the first plan tries to convince Olivia to use some other avenue. The scandal has Mellie in tremendous stress with her approval rating dropping drastically. Abby and Quinn try to find the hacker who Cyrus has been sending information to—who is found murdered. This leaves Olivia with the option of poisoning Cyrus with cyanide and a perfect cover-up for the murder. On the verge of taking a sip of the poisoned wine, Jake comes to Cyrus' rescue. Marcus tries to persuade Mellie to address the rumors head on. She later addresses a press briefing refuting the claims that she had a hand in Air Force Two hijacking. Olivia visits Fitz's apartment and they have sex. Vanessa discovers that her husband is in cahoots with Cyrus; he kills her thereafter. Cyrus and Jake restructure their alliance.
123	17	"Standing in the Sun"	Jann Turner	Mark Fish & Matt Byrne	April 12, 2018	717	4.15
Tension is rising in the midst of the developments in Cyrus and Jake's mission to take the White House. Mellie is summoned to testify to the scandalous Air Force Two hijacking. She initially denies any involvement in the hijacking but information on the death of president Rashad, forces her to plead the fifth. In despair, Jake tries to blackmail Olivia into throwing Mellie under the bus—she ends up exposing the existence of B613 to Lonnie Mencken. QPA also seems to have hit a dead end in trying to figure out the way to bring Jake and Cyrus down, only to find they will end up incriminating themselves in the process. Sally Langston comes to their aid by breaking to the nation, through her televised show, on the existence of top secret organization, B613—a consequence that puts Cyrus and Jake's plans in jeopardy.
124	18	"Over a Cliff"	Tom Verica	Shonda Rhimes	April 19, 2018	718	5.46
Due to the recent reveal of B613's existence, Olivia meets with Lonnie Mencken, who says he will make sure they get a proper Senate hearing if Mellie makes gun control her first priority. After Olivia agrees, he shoots himself to ensure the hearing takes place, leaving David in charge. At the senate hearing Olivia admits to ordering Rashad's assassination, Mellie and Fitz admit they knew of B613, Tom confesses to killing Frankie Vargas under Cyrus' orders, and Hollis admits to being a part of election fraud. Everyone starts to deal with their impending imprisonment while helping get Quinn to Charlie so they can get married. After failing to kill David, Jake tells Cyrus he is not going to take his orders anymore. On his quest to have Mellie impeached, Cyrus poisons David and smothers him. The ruling is postponed due to a new witness coming forward: Rowan; he admits to being command. Jake is imprisoned for his actions in B613. An alcoholic Cyrus resigns as vice president. Mellie approves of the bill on gun control to law. Two young girls visit the gallery where there is a portrait of Olivia.

== Production ==
=== Development ===
Scandal was renewed for a seventh season on February 10, 2017, along with the other ShondaLand dramas. The series continued to air on Thursdays in its 9 p.m. E.T. timeslot like the previous seasons, but unlike the previous season which aired in January, the seventh season premiered in the fall of 2017. ABC announced on June 26, 2017, that the seventh season would consist of 18 episodes.

Long-time director Tom Verica shared on Twitter that he would only direct the series finale as well as the fact that Kerry Washington would be directing her first episode. Actress Darby Stanchfield also directed her first episode.

==== Final season ====
Speculations about the seventh season being the final season had started as the sixth season began airing. ABC entertainment president Channing Dungey commented in January 2017 that it had not been much discussion about the show's future after the seventh season, but she would happily keep the show on as long as Rhimes "feels that she has creative runway to write the show." Andy Swift from TVLine said that the show needed to end after the seventh season as he felt "this once-great drama is simply spinning its wheels, serving us the same old flavors with only slightly different toppings." Before the sixth-season finale, multiple sources reported that Scandal would be ending next season. ABC confirmed on May 16, 2017, that the seventh season would be the final season for the show. Shonda Rhimes released a statement about the ending of the show calling the seventh season "Olivia's Swan Song" as she said:

Deciding how to end a show is easy. Deciding when to finish is quite simple when the end date is years away. But actually going through with it? Actually standing up to say: ‘This is it?’ Not so much. So, next year we are going all out. Leaving nothing on the table. Creating this world in celebration. We are going to handle the end the way we like to handle the important things in our Scandal family: all together, white hats on, gladiators running full speed over a cliff.

==== How to Get Away with Murder crossover ====
On January 3, 2018, Kerry Washington tweeted out a photo to Viola Davis of herself in a "familiar" setting, that being a courthouse used for the set of How to Get Away with Murder. Fans began to speculate a possible crossover episode being in the works, which was only heightened when Davis tweeted out a photo in response, that being her on the set of Mellie Grant's (Bellamy Young) Oval Office. Later that day, the crossover was officially confirmed through a tweet by Scandal creator Shonda Rhimes.

How to Get Away with Murder creator Peter Nowalk later went on to share in an interview with Deadline:

At the beginning of the season, my writers and I were planning out Viola's entire arc and something in her story organically came up that was very appropriate for Scandal. When I went to Shonda, she heard it. I said, we don't have to do it, Viola's arc doesn't need this, but it's possible that their stories could cross really organically. She actually pulled up a clip of something from Scandal and their side of the story coalesced perfectly. So it was one of those serendipitous things where we both realized it was good for both characters, and it almost felt like we had been planning it since last season.

=== Casting ===
In May 2017, actor George Newbern, who has had recurring appearances since the show's beginning as Charlie, was promoted to the regular cast. In August, Jay Hernandez and Shaun Toub were cast in unspecified, recurring roles.

== Reception ==
=== Ratings ===
Viewership and ratings per episode of Scandal season 7
No.	Title	Air date	Rating/share (18–49)	Viewers (millions)	DVR (18–49)	DVR viewers (millions)	Total (18–49)	Total viewers (millions)
1	"Watch Me"	October 5, 2017	1.4/5	5.52	1.1	3.09	2.5	8.61
2	"Pressing the Flesh"	October 12, 2017	1.2/4	5.00	1.1	TBD	2.3	TBD
3	"Day 101"	October 19, 2017	1.1/4	4.70	1.0	2.55	2.1	7.25
4	"Lost Girls"	October 26, 2017	1.1/4	4.88	0.9	2.54	2.0	7.42
5	"Adventures in Babysitting"	November 2, 2017	1.1/4	4.89	1.0	2.61	2.1	7.50
6	"Vampires and Bloodsuckers"	November 9, 2017	1.1/4	5.00	0.9	2.43	2.0	7.43
7	"Something Borrowed"	November 16, 2017	1.1/4	4.97	0.9	2.49	2.0	7.46
8	"Robin"	January 18, 2018	1.2/5	5.17	0.8	2.43	2.1	7.60
9	"Good People"	January 25, 2018	1.3/5	5.19	0.8	2.33	2.1	7.52
10	"The People vs. Olivia Pope"	February 1, 2018	1.4/5	5.62	0.9	2.40	2.3	8.02
11	"Army of One"	February 8, 2018	1.1/4	4.64	0.9	2.50	2.0	7.14
12	"Allow Me to Reintroduce Myself"	March 1, 2018	1.2/5	4.95	0.9	2.73	2.1	7.70
13	"Air Force Two"	March 8, 2018	1.1/4	4.67	0.8	TBD	1.9	TBD
14	"The List"	March 15, 2018	1.1/4	4.74	0.9	2.43	2.0	7.17
15	"The Noise"	March 29, 2018	0.8/3	3.71	0.9	2.65	1.7	6.36
16	"People Like Me"	April 5, 2018	0.9/4	3.83	0.9	2.62	1.8	6.45
17	"Standing in the Sun"	April 12, 2018	0.9/4	4.15	0.9	2.66	1.8	6.82
18	"Over a Cliff"	April 19, 2018	1.3/5	5.46	0.8	2.65	2.1	8.11

=== Critical response ===
Review aggregator Rotten Tomatoes reported a 92% approval rating with an average rating of 7.60/10, based on 24 reviews. The site's critical consensus states: "With the aptitude that helped change the face of serialized drama, Scandal concludes its fiery run with unpredictability, heart, and an emphasis on cultural affairs."

=== Awards and nominations ===
Ceremony	Category	Nominee(s)	Result	Ref.
Primetime Emmy Awards	Outstanding Guest Actress in a Drama Series	Viola Davis (for "Allow Me to Reintroduce Myself")	Nominated	
