= Baby It's Cold Outside (Pezband song) =

Song by Pezband

from the album Pezband
- Language: English
- Released: 1977
- Genre: Power pop
- Length: 2:49
- Label: Passport
- Songwriter(s): Mimi Betinis

"Baby It's Cold Outside" is a song by the American rock band Pezband. It was written by the group's lead singer, Mimi Betinis. The song was originally featured on the 1977 album Pezband, but has since been released on the 2012 reissue, "Pezband (Remastered)".
