= Baby, It's Cold Outside (Scandal) =

- Scandal episode
- Episode no.: Season 5 Episode 9
- Directed by: Tom Verica
- Written by: Mark Wilding
- Original air date: November 19, 2015

Episode chronology
← Previous "Rasputin"	Next → "It's Hard Out Here for a General"
- Scandal (season 5)

"Baby, It's Cold Outside" is the 9th episode and mid-season finale of the fifth season of the American political thriller television series Scandal. It takes its title from the 1944 song "Baby, It's Cold Outside" written by Frank Loesser.

It aired on November 19, 2015 on American Broadcasting Company (ABC) in the United States. The episode was written by Mark Wilding and directed by Tom Verica.

The episode was notable for featuring a scene in which Olivia Pope has an abortion, a scene which shocked and surprised viewers as her pregnancy was not revealed to the audience until the operation.

== Plot ==
Learning that the senate plans to defund Planned Parenthood before the Christmas break Mellie stages an impromptu filibuster to block the bill from passing. Unprepared for the filibuster, she is on the verge of giving up when Susan Ross comes to the senate and Mellie yields the floor to her so that she can go to the restroom. While there she encounters Liv, whom she realizes helped to orchestrate the break.

Meanwhile, Liv grows increasingly exhausted from playing at being the first lady for Fitz. Watching from the sidelines as Mellie performs her bold political act, Liv goes to get an abortion herself. Returning to the White House she and Fitz get into an argument and they break up. Returning home in time for Christmas she has her old, wine-stained, couch thrown out and a new one delivered.

== Production ==
In 2017 showrunner Shonda Rhimes revealed that broadcaster ABC wanted to cut or alter the abortion scene before it was even shot but later backed down after Rhimes said she would go public with the editing: "I said,'Go ahead, alter the scene. We'll just have a lot of articles about how you altered the scene'".

The abortion scene was set to Silent Night sung by Aretha Franklin. Rhimes also reached out to Franklin's team to make sure they knew the context of the scene and was told that the singer approved and supported the use of her music in the scene.

== Reception ==
=== Critical reception ===
The episode was well received by television critics, with many praising show creator Shonda Rhimes for the way in which she integrated Olivia Pope's decision to have an abortion into the episode. Ben Philippe at The A.V. Club wrote an essay about the abortion, praising it for making the show "actually political". Lenika Cruz writing for The Atlantic praised the understated way in which abortion was worked into the episode, saying that the "most remarkable thing about the episode's big moment was how unremarkable it was."

The health services organization Planned Parenthood, which was featured heavily in the episode, praised Shonda Rhimes for the episode, releasing a statement that said in part, "We applaud Shonda Rhimes tonight—and every Thursday night—for proving that when women are telling our stories, the world will pause and watch."

Norman Lear, who created the sitcom Maude, in which the lead character chose to have an abortion after much consideration in an episode that aired in 1972, spoke out in support of the episode, saying that he "love[d] the way it was handled", while admitting surprise that "it was so matter of fact".

The episode received backlash from right-wing conservative groups such as the Media Research Center who called it “sick,” saying the episode was "Hollywood's moral depravity on full display.”Many believe that the playing of the song "Silent Night" during the abortion was almost like the show spitting in the face of Christian beliefs.
