= List of awards and nominations received by Boston Legal =

List of awards won by Boston Legal
Awards and nominations
| Award | Won | Nominated |
| Artios Awards | 0 | 1 |
| Directors Guild of America Awards | 0 | 1 |
| Eddie Awards | 1 | 3 |
| Golden Globe Awards | 1 | 4 |
| GLAAD Media Awards | 1 | 1 |
| Humanitas Prizes | 0 | 1 |
| NAACP Image Awards | 0 | 1 |
| Peabody Awards | 1 | — |
| People's Choice Awards | 0 | 1 |
| Producers Guild Awards | 0 | 2 |
| Primetime Emmy Awards | 5 | 26 |
| Prism Awards | 4 | 4 |
| Satellite Awards | 1 | 6 |
| Screen Actors Guild Awards | 0 | 11 |
- Total number of wins and nominations
| Totals | 14 | 62 |
- Footnotes

Boston Legal is an American legal dramedy that ran on ABC from October 3, 2004, to December 8, 2008. The show follows the cases and personal lives of the lawyers of law firm Crane, Pool and Schmidt. The show has been nominated for a variety of awards, including 26 Primetime Emmy Awards, eleven Screen Actors Guild Awards, six Satellite Awards, four Golden Globe Awards, two Producers Guild of America Awards and a Peabody Award.

Most of these nominations are for acting, of the show's ensemble cast numerous actors have received nominations. James Spader has received the most award nominations, 15 in total, while winning 3. Spader is closely followed by William Shatner, who received a total of 14 nominations, winning 3 awards as well. The crew members with most award nominations are producer and director Bill D'Elia, with six nominations and zero wins, and show creator David E. Kelley, with five nominations and one win. In total Boston Legal has been nominated for 62 awards, and won 14.

== Emmy Awards ==
The Primetime Emmy Awards are presented yearly by the Academy of Television Arts & Sciences, they are considered to be the television equivalent to the Academy Awards, and thus one of the highest honours for television shows. The awards are divided into regular Primetime Emmy Awards, which honour acting, directing and writing in television, and Creative Arts Primetime Emmy Awards, which honour behind-the-scenes technical work such as editing and sound mixing. Boston Legal has been nominated for a total of 26 Primetime Emmy Awards, winning five in total, four of which were for acting. The show was nominated for "Outstanding Drama Series" in 2007 and 2008 yet never won in that category.

=== Primetime Emmy Awards ===
| Year | Category | Nominee(s) | Episode | Result |
|---|---|---|---|---|
| 2005 | Outstanding Lead Actor – Drama Series | James Spader as Alan Shore | "Death Not Be Proud" | Won |
| 2005 | Outstanding Supporting Actor – Drama Series | William Shatner as Denny Crane | "It Girls and Beyond" & "Tortured Souls" | Won |
| 2006 | Outstanding Supporting Actor – Drama Series | William Shatner as Denny Crane | "Witches of Mass Destruction" & "Live Big" | Nominated |
| 2006 | Outstanding Guest Actor – Drama Series | Michael J. Fox as Daniel Post | | Nominated |
| 2006 | Outstanding Guest Actor – Drama Series | Christian Clemenson as Jerry "Hands" Espenson | | Won |
| 2006 | Outstanding Supporting Actress – Drama Series | Candice Bergen as Shirley Schmidt | "Ass Fat Jungle" & "Live Big" | Nominated |
| 2007 | Outstanding Directing - Drama Series | Bill D'Elia | "Son of the Defender" | Nominated |
| 2007 | Outstanding Supporting Actor – Drama Series | William Shatner as Denny Crane | "Son of the Defender" | Nominated |
| 2007 | Outstanding Guest Actor – Drama Series | Christian Clemenson as Jerry "Hands" Espenson | "Guise 'n Dolls" | Nominated |
| 2007 | Outstanding Lead Actor – Drama Series | James Spader as Alan Shore | "Angel of Death" | Won |
| 2007 | Outstanding Drama Series | David E. Kelley, Bill D'Elia, Janet Leahy, Mike Listo, Steve Robin, Janet G. Knutsen | "Lincoln", "On the Ledge", "The Good Lawyer", "Angel of Death", "Son of the Defender" & "Trial of the Century" | Nominated |
| 2008 | Outstanding Lead Actor – Drama Series | James Spader as Alan Shore | "The Court Supreme" | Nominated |
| 2008 | Outstanding Supporting Actor In A Drama Series | William Shatner as Denny Crane | "Mad About You" | Nominated |
| 2008 | Outstanding Supporting Actress – Drama Series | Candice Bergen as Shirley Schmidt | "The Mighty Rogues" | Nominated |
| 2008 | Outstanding Directing - Drama Series | Arlene Sanford | "The Mighty Rogues" | Nominated |
| 2008 | Outstanding Drama Series | David E. Kelley, Bill D'Elia, Lawrence Broch, Mike Listo, Steve Robin, Janet G. Knutsen | "The Chicken and the Leg", "Mad About You", "Tabloid Nation", "The Mighty Rogues", "The Court Supreme" & "Patriot Acts" | Nominated |
| 2009 | Outstanding Supporting Actor In A Drama Series | William Shatner as Denny Crane | "Made in China/Last Call" | Nominated |
| 2009 | Outstanding Supporting Actor In A Drama Series | Christian Clemenson as Jerry "Hands" Espenson | "Roe" | Nominated |
| 2009 | Outstanding Directing - Drama Series | Bill D'Elia | "Made in China/Last Call" | Nominated |

=== Creative Arts Primetime Emmy Awards ===
| Year | Category | Nominee(s) | Episode | Result |
|---|---|---|---|---|
| 2006 | Outstanding Casting for a Drama Series | Ken Miller & Nikki Valko | | Nominated |
| 2006 | Outstanding Single-Camera Picture Editing for a Drama Series | Philip Carr Neel | "Race Ipsa" | Nominated |
| 2006 | Outstanding Single-Camera Sound Mixing For A Series | Craig Hunter, Peter Kelsey, Clark King, William Butler | "Finding Nimmo" | Won |
| 2007 | Outstanding Single-Camera Sound Mixing For A Series | Peter Kelsey, Clark King, David Rawlinson | "Lincoln" | Nominated |
| 2008 | Outstanding Single-Camera Picture Editing for a Drama Series | Philip Carr Neel | "The Mighty Rogues" | Nominated |
| 2008 | Outstanding Single-Camera Sound Mixing For A Series | Peter Kelsey, Clark King, David Rawlinson | "Beauty and the Beast" | Nominated |
| 2009 | Outstanding Single-Camera Sound Mixing For A Series | Peter Kelsey, Clark King, David Rawlinson | "Last Call" | Nominated |

== Golden Globe Awards ==
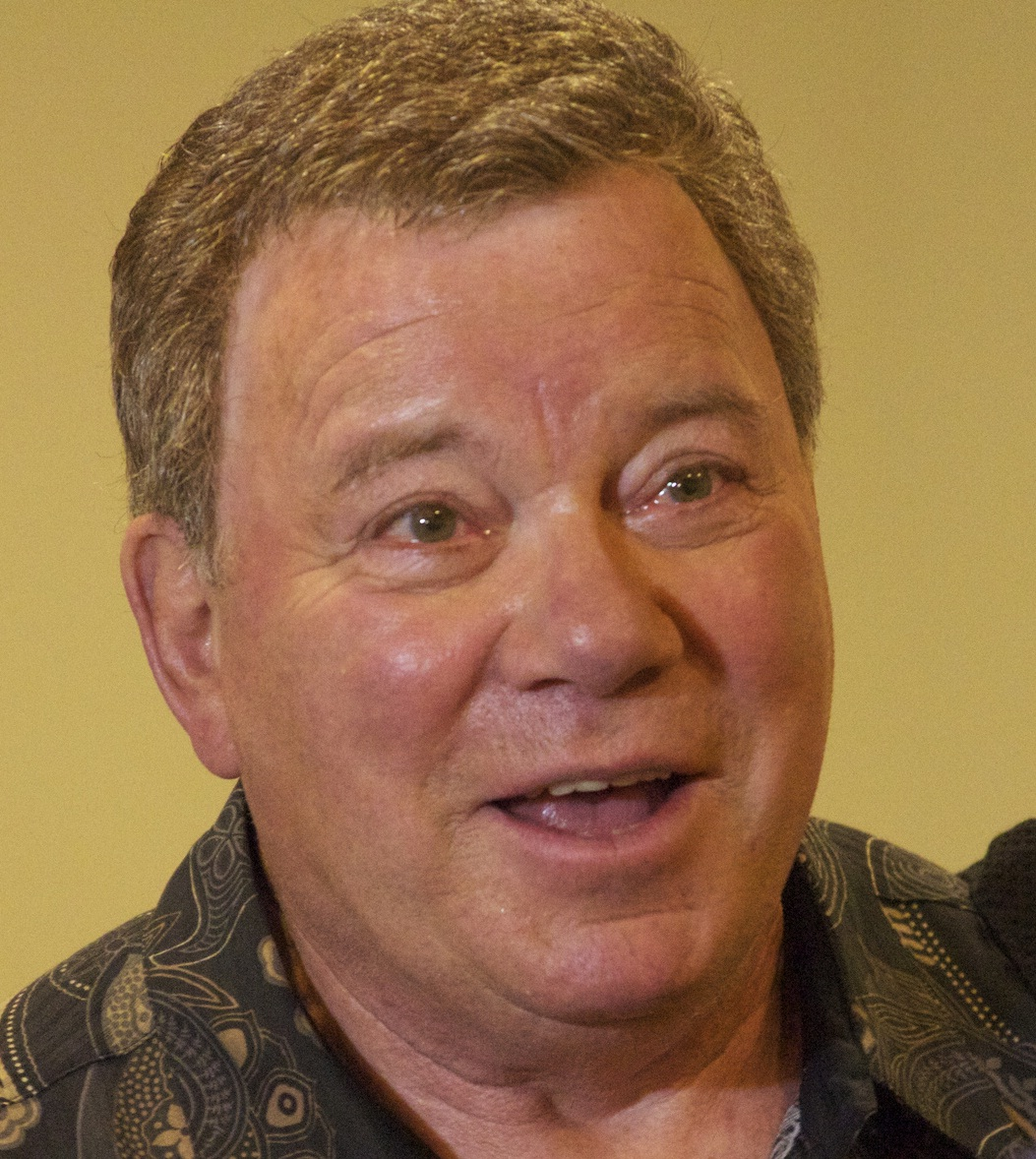
William Shatner is the only cast member to receive a Golden Globe.

Boston Legal has been nominated for four Hollywood Foreign Press Association's Golden Globe Awards during its run, it has received one in 2005.

| Year | Category | Nominee(s) | Result |
|---|---|---|---|
| 2005 | Best Performance by an Actor In A Television Series – Drama | James Spader | Nominated |
| 2005 | Best Performance by an Actor in a Supporting Role in a Series, Mini-Series or Motion Picture Made for Television | William Shatner | Won |
| 2006 | Best Supporting Actress – Series, Miniseries or Television Film | Candice Bergen | Nominated |
| 2008 | Best Performance by an Actor in a Supporting Role in a Series, Mini-Series or Motion Picture Made for Television | William Shatner | Nominated |

== Satellite Awards ==
The Satellite awards, presented annually by the International Press Academy, honour excellence in film and television. Of its total of six nominations, Boston Legal has won one, which went to James Spader in 2006.

| Year | Category | Nominee(s) | Result |
|---|---|---|---|
| 2004 | Best Actor in a Series, Drama | James Spader | Nominated |
| 2004 | Best Television Series, Drama | | Nominated |
| 2005 | Best Actor - Musical or Comedy Series | James Spader | Nominated |
| 2005 | Best Actress - Musical or Comedy Series | Candice Bergen | Nominated |
| 2005 | Best Series - Musical or Comedy | | Nominated |
| 2006 | Best Actor - Musical or Comedy Series | James Spader | Won |

== Screen Actors Guild Awards ==
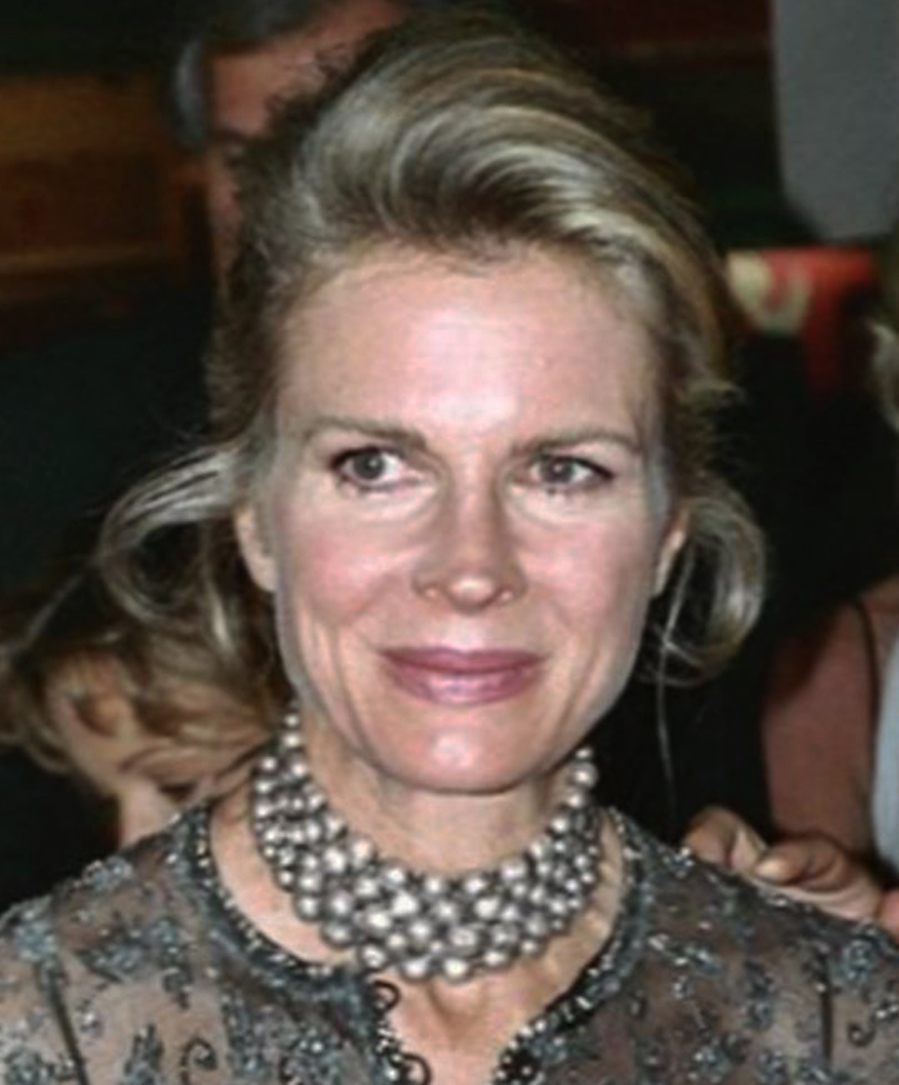
Candice Bergen has received one individual SAG award nomination, and three alongside the rest of the cast.

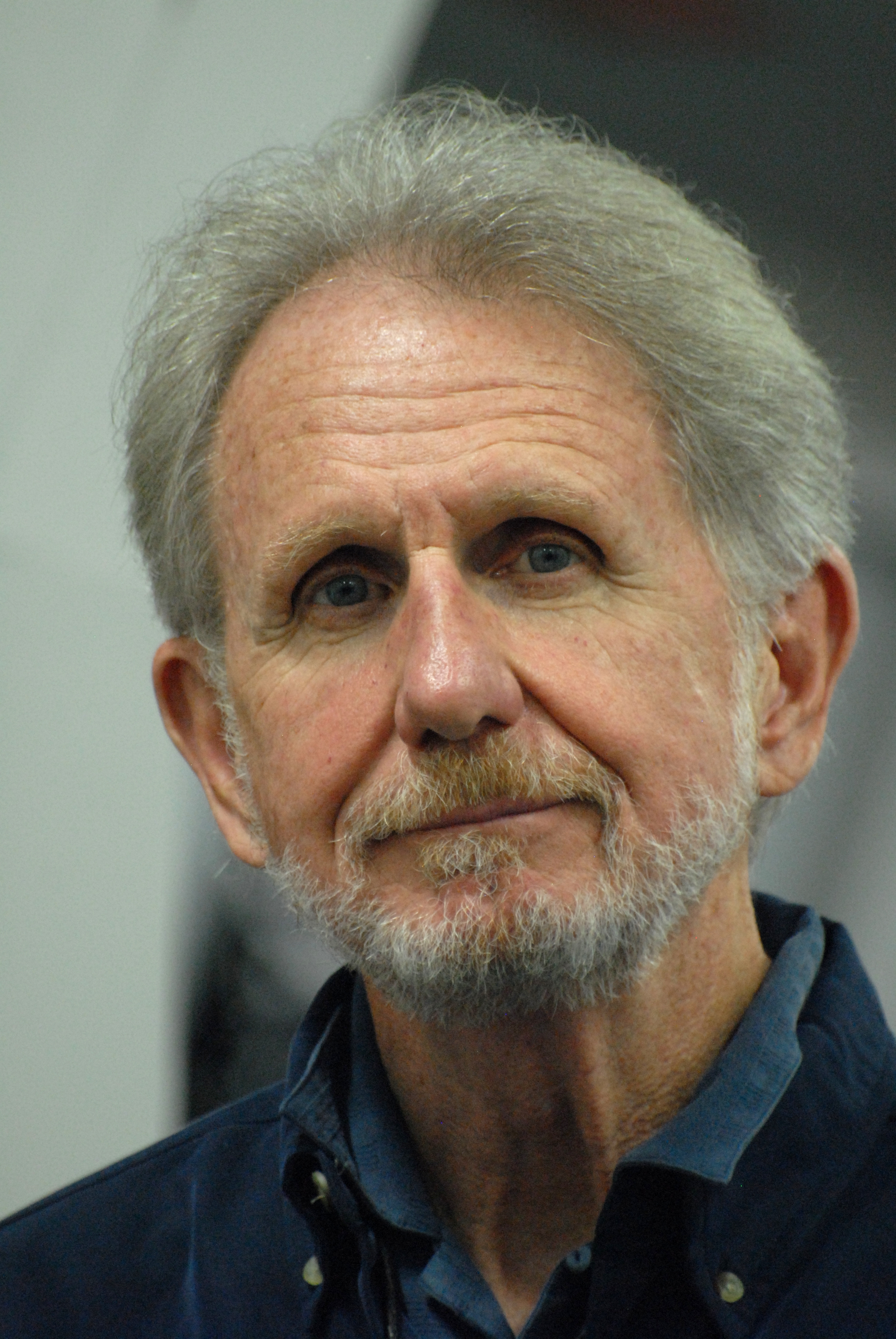
René Auberjonois has received three SAG award nominations alongside the rest of the cast.

The Screen Actors Guild Awards are presented annually by SAG-AFTRA. Boston Legal has received eleven nominations during its run, including three for Outstanding Performance by an Ensemble in a Drama Series, but has never won any. James Spader has received most Screen Actors Guild Award nominations, four individual and three along with the rest of the cast.

| Year | Category | Nominee(s) | Result |
|---|---|---|---|
| 2006 | Outstanding Performance by an Ensemble in a Comedy Series | René Auberjonois, Ryan Michelle Bathe, Candice Bergen, Julie Bowen, Justin Mentell, Rhona Mitra, Monica Potter, William Shatner, James Spader, Mark Valley | Nominated |
| 2006 | Outstanding Performance by a Female Actor in a Comedy Series | Candice Bergen | Nominated |
| 2006 | Outstanding Performance by a Male Actor in a Comedy Series | William Shatner | Nominated |
| 2006 | Outstanding Performance by a Male Actor in a Comedy Series | James Spader | Nominated |
| 2007 | Outstanding Performance by a Male Actor in a Drama Series | James Spader | Nominated |
| 2007 | Outstanding Performance by an Ensemble in a Drama Series | René Auberjonois, Craig Bierko, Candice Bergen, Julie Bowen, William Shatner, James Spader, Mark Valley | Nominated |
| 2008 | Outstanding Performance by a Male Actor in a Drama Series | James Spader | Nominated |
| 2008 | Outstanding Performance by an Ensemble in a Drama Series | René Auberjonois, Saffron Burrows, Christian Clemenson, Taraji P. Henson, John Laroquette, Tara Summers, Constance Zimmer, Gary Anthony Williams, Candice Bergen, Julie Bowen, William Shatner, James Spader, Mark Valley | Nominated |
| 2009 | Outstanding Performance by a Male Actor in a Drama Series | James Spader | Nominated |
| 2009 | Outstanding Performance by a Male Actor in a Drama Series | William Shatner | Nominated |
| 2009 | Outstanding Performance by an Ensemble in a Drama Series | Saffron Burrows, Christian Clemenson, Taraji P. Henson, John Laroquette, Tara Summers, Gary Anthony Williams, Candice Bergen, William Shatner, James Spader | Nominated |

== Other Awards ==
Boston Legal has been nominated for various guild and society awards, including Producers Guild of America Awards, a Directors Guild of America Award, American Cinema Editors Eddie Awards and a People's Choice Award. Amongst the wins for the series are four Prism Awards and a GLAAD Media Award. In 2005, Boston Legal was awarded a Peabody Award "for fearing neither silliness nor social commentary and for adroitly combining the two".

| Year | Award | Category | Nominee | Result |
|---|---|---|---|---|
| 2004 | Artios Award | Best Casting - Episodic Drama | Ken Miller & Nikki Valko | Nominated |
| 2006 | Directors Guild of America Award | Outstanding Directing - Comedy Series | Arlene Sanford for "Breast in Show" | Nominated |
| 2005 | Eddie Awards | Best Edited One-Hour Series for Television | Philip Carr Neel for "Hired Guns" | Won |
| 2006 | Eddie Awards | Best Edited One-Hour Series for Commercial Television | Philip Carr Neel | Nominated |
| 2009 | Eddie Awards | Best Edited One-Hour Series for Commercial Television | Craig Bench for "True Love" | Nominated |
| 2008 | GLAAD Media Award | Best Individual Episode - Series without a Regular LGBT Character | "Do Tell" | Won |
| 2008 | Humanitas Prize | 60 Minute Category | David E. Kelley, Susan Dickes, Jill Goldsmith | Nominated |
| 2005 | Image Award | Outstanding Supporting Actress - Drama Series | Kerry Washington | Nominated |
| 2005 | Peabody Award | — | 20th Century Fox, David E. Kelley | Won |
| 2004 | People's Choice Award | Favorite New TV Series - Drama | | Nominated |
| 2007 | Prism Awards | Performance in a Drama Series, Multi-Episode Storyline | Jayne Brook | Won |
| 2007 | Prism Awards | Performance in a Drama Series, Multi-Episode Storyline | René Auberjonois | Won |
| 2009 | Prism Awards | Performance in a Drama Episode | William Shatner | Won |
| 2009 | Prism Awards | Drama Episode | "Smoke Signals" | Won |
| 2006 | Producers Guild of America Awards | The Norman Felton Award for Outstanding Producer of Episodic Television Drama | David E. Kelley, Bill D'Elia, Mike Listo, Steve Robin, Janet G. Knutsen | Nominated |
| 2009 | Producers Guild of America Awards | The Norman Felton Award for Outstanding Producer of Episodic Television Drama | David E. Kelley, Bill D'Elia, Mike Listo, Steve Robin, Janet G. Knutsen | Nominated |
