= List of The Practice episodes =

The Practice is an American legal drama created by David E. Kelley centring on the partners and associates at a Boston law firm. The series was broadcast for eight seasons from 1997 to 2004, initially as a mid-season replacement. The Practice won many Primetime Emmy Awards, including Outstanding Drama Series in 1998 and 1999. As part of the fictional universe in which many shows produced by David E. Kelley are set The Practice had crossover story arcs with Gideon's Crossing, Boston Public, and Ally McBeal in addition to its own more jovial spin-off series Boston Legal, which was broadcast from 2004 to 2008.

The Practice focused on the law firm of Robert Donnell and Associates (later becoming Donnell, Young, Dole & Frutt, and ultimately Young, Frutt, & Berluti). Plots typically featured the firm's involvement in various high-profile criminal and civil cases that often mirrored current events at the time of the episodes' initial broadcast. Conflict between legal ethics and personal morality was a recurring theme.

== Series overview ==
Season	Episodes	Originally released	
Season	Episodes	First released	Last released
1	6	March 4, 1997	April 8, 1997
2	28	September 20, 1997	May 11, 1998
3	23	September 27, 1998	May 9, 1999
4	22	September 26, 1999	May 21, 2000
5	22	October 8, 2000	May 13, 2001
6	23	September 23, 2001	May 19, 2002
7	22	September 29, 2002	May 5, 2003
8	22	September 28, 2003	May 16, 2004

== Episodes ==
=== Season 1 (1997) ===
No. overall	No. in season	Title	Directed by	Written by	Original release date	Prod. code	Viewers (millions)
1	1	"Pilot"	Mick Jackson	David E. Kelley	March 4, 1997	1ABQ79	15.49
Bobby defends Rachel Reynolds, a young woman facing drug charges, and Ellenor second chairs. Bobby is stressed because it looks bad for Reynolds, as she is not a drug dealer, but was trying to cover for her brother. Lindsay represents Emerson Ray, who is suing a tobacco company in a wrongful death suit. Lindsay is surprised that her favorite law professor, Anderson Pearson, represents the defense. Eugene represents "Free Willy", a man who has a problem with exposing himself in public.
2	2	"Part II"	Michael Pressman	David E. Kelley	March 11, 1997	1ABQ01	11.89
Bobby represents a man facing armed robbery charges. His strategy is to keep it from going to trial and to plead out to lesser charges. Eugene's client fears for her and her 11-year-old son's safety, at the hands of her ex-husband. Eugene makes several attempts to get a restraining order, and even crosses the line by making threats of his own. The situation goes from bad to worse, and has deadly consequences. Bobby pays a visit to friend and banker Jimmy Berluti in an attempt to secure a loan.
3	3	"Trial and Error"	Rick Rosenthal	David E. Kelley	March 18, 1997	1ABQ02	12.04
Bobby pays attention to The Commonwealth V Ronald Martin, as he plans to represent Gerald Braun in a wrongful death suit against Martin. "Free Willy" returns, after being arrested in a peculiar position with a hooker. Defense Lawyers in the Emerson Ray case make a motion to have the case dismissed. Bobby fears that the judge is biased, and uses a controversial card to have the judge removed. Jimmy is fired for approving a construction loan under false pretenses. Bobby decides to hire Jimmy.
4	4	"Part IV"	James Frawley	David E. Kelley	March 25, 1997	1ABQ03	12.24
Lindsay prepares to take on her first case against the tobacco industry. Dr. Braun's anger takes a fatal step. Jimmy and Braun's Rabbi make an appearance on a talk show. The Rabbi's comments on the show make the case even more difficult for Dr. Braun, and could result in accessory charges of his own.
5	5	"Part V"	Michael Schultz	David E. Kelley	April 1, 1997	1ABQ04	11.93
Eugene defends Steven Frenault for armed robbery, and makes a bet with the D.A. that he will win the case. Ellenor meets George Vogelman, a man that answered her personal ad. Dr. Braun refuses to explore temporary insanity as a defense for the murder of Ronald Martin.
6	6	"Part VI"	Dennie Gordon	Ed Redlich	April 8, 1997	1ABQ05	12.06
Gerald Braun goes on trial for murdering his daughter's killer, and Bobby argues the execution was moral. Meanwhile, Eugene defends a 19-year-old accused of statutory rape.

=== Season 2 (1997–98) ===
No. overall	No. in season	Title	Directed by	Written by	Original release date	Prod. code	Viewers (millions)
7	1	"Reasonable Doubts"	Michael Pressman	David E. Kelley	September 20, 1997	2ABQ01	8.80
Bobby's judgment is called into question by the firm's other members when he becomes romantically involved with a beautiful, icy client who shot to death a male neighbor she claims was attempting to rape her. The prosecution says it was murder. Another neighbor produces a videotape that may turn the case after Bobby rejects the maker's attempt to extort him.
8	2	"Betrayal"	Thomas Schlamme	David E. Kelley	September 23, 1997	2ABQ02	11.92
The firm defends Joey Heric, a colorful client on trial for the murder of his lover, a prominent city councilman. Jimmy is tried on solicitation charges by a vengeful district attorney.
9	3	"The Blessing"	Lee Bonner	David E. Kelley	September 27, 1997	2ABQ03	8.73
Bobby and Helen clash in and out of the courtroom when an emotional assisted-suicide case forces them to confront painful memories. Meanwhile, Lindsay goes head-to-head with her ex-boyfriend when she defends an elderly bookie.
10	4	"Dog Bite"	Steve Miner	David E. Kelley & David Shore	October 4, 1997	1ABQ06	10.01
Jimmy finally gets his first case, that of a little girl bitten by a dog. A juror approaches Lindsay with inside information on a case. Eugene defends a one-legged mugger. The firm questions aloud their ethics concerning the clients they've defended.
11	5	"First Degree: Part 1"	Joe Napolitano	Michael R. Perry & Stephen Gaghan and David E. Kelley	October 11, 1997	1ABQ07	9.24
Ellenor and Lindsay face disbarment proceedings for their unethical conduct. Bobby defends a man accused of murdering his lover's husband. Eugene represents a police officer applying for disability, claiming the job made him a racist. Jimmy shares a secret with Lindsay. To be continued...
12	6	"Sex, Lies and Monkeys: Part 2"	Lee Bonner	Teleplay by : David E. Kelley & Ed Redlich & Stephen Gaghan & Michael R. Perry; Story by : David E. Kelley & Alex Genya	October 18, 1997	1ABQ08	9.25
Bobby tries to right a wrong after finding the truth about his client. Ellenor is sued by George Vogelman, her podiatrist friend, for causing him emotional distress, while Jimmy defends a man who lost his job because in the eyes of his boss, he looks like a monkey. Lindsay has hazy recollections about a night out with Chris Kelton.
13	7	"Search and Seizure"	Michael Schultz	David E. Kelley	October 25, 1997	2ABQ04	8.72
Rebecca's friend enlists the firm to try to set a legal precedent by forcing his wife to have a C-section against her wishes. Benny Small is tried for drug possession, leading to another battle with Dickie Flood. Helen asks Bobby out to a Halloween party.
14	8	"The Means"	Oz Scott	Todd Ellis Kessler	November 8, 1997	2ABQ05	7.90
A black client is tried for the brutal beating of a department store security guard during a riot. Bobby plans to use a defense very unpopular with both his client and second-chair Eugene. Meanwhile, Ellenor's obnoxious cousin wants to sue the travel agent that booked her honeymoon on allegations of 'emotional distress'.
15	9	"Save the Mule"	John Patterson	Ed Redlich & Andrew Smith	November 15, 1997	2ABQ06	9.16
Lindsay is hired by a drug dealer to defend his "mule" who has been caught smuggling drugs over the border. Jimmy takes on a case of a community stricken by cancer. Bobby must decide with whom he wants to pursue a romance. A former activist enlists Bobby's help after being underground for 25 years.
16	10	"Spirit of America"	Michael Schultz	Ed Redlich	November 22, 1997	2ABQ07	7.54
Followed by a documentary crew, Donnell & Associates travel to another state in a last-minute attempt to get a stay of execution for convicted murderer Randall Jefferson while a documentary crew watches their every move.
17	11	"Hide and Seek"	Steve Miner	David E. Kelley	November 29, 1997	1ABQ11	8.60
Bobby and Lindsay second-chair Bobby's old mentor, Raymond Oz, when Oz fears he's losing his memory. Eugene struggles with his conscience when he defends a man on trial for raping and murdering two boys. Jimmy's fantasies come true when a childhood sex symbol seeks his legal counsel.
18	12	"Race with the Devil"	Oz Scott	David E. Kelley & David Shore	December 13, 1997	1ABQ09	7.31
Bobby's priest performs an exorcism on a parishioner, who dies during the procedure. Bobby must manipulate the system to shield Father Martin from murder charges. Eugene represents Martin Parks in a bizarre malpractice suit. Jimmy decides to tape a television commercial, a decision that proves unpopular with his colleagues.
19	13	"The Civil Right"	David Jones	B.J. White & Joseph Telushkin & Allen Estrin	December 20, 1997	1ABQ10	7.48
Jimmy is furious when his mother reveals her love for another woman. He feels obligated to represent her in court when she requests he argue her right to marry her lover. Bobby and Rebecca deal with a large crowd that is responding to Jimmy's grunt commercial. Meanwhile, Eugene refuses to defend a rapist after he runs into one of his client's victims in a clothing store.
20	14	"The Pursuit of Dignity"	Michael Schultz	David E. Kelley	January 3, 1998	1ABQ12	7.62
Bobby reconnects with an old girlfriend who needs his help after she is arrested for prostitution. Ellenor and Rebecca fight to keep a 12-year-old Lisa with Tourette's Syndrome in school. Rebecca takes an active role in Lisa's behalf. Lindsay represents a woman who is suing her doctor for sewing live maggots into her leg to prevent post-surgical infection.
21	15	"Line of Duty"	Robert Mandel	David E. Kelley	January 5, 1998	2ABQ08	12.08
Bobby is arrested and tried for the deaths of three police officers, after he tips off a client, using information obtained during a sleepover at Helen's, that the police are planning to raid him. Jimmy has to defend himself when an opposing attorney claims he's unfit to practice law.
22	16	"Truth and Consequences"	Stephen Cragg	David E. Kelley & Joseph Telushkin & Allen Estrin	January 12, 1998	2ABQ09	12.11
Rebecca's life is threatened after she witnesses a murder and picks the killer out of a police lineup. Jimmy continues his case against the electric company. Helen pushes the envelope in order to protect a witness.
23	17	"Burden of Proof"	Daniel Attias	David E. Kelley	January 19, 1998	2ABQ10	11.35
The trial against Boston Electric begins, with Jimmy bringing both a weak case and doubts as to whether his star witness will be sober, into court. Jimmy also must bear the pressure and doubts from Bobby.
24	18	"Ties that Bind"	Mel Damski	David E. Kelley & Larry Mollin	February 2, 1998	2ABQ11	10.88
Lindsay and Ellenor defend a pornographic star accused of killing her co-star. Complications arise in the Moreno case when it appears Rebecca's ID of the suspect may have been tainted. Lindsay's fondness for having her elbows sucked works against Bobby when he sucks on Helen's elbows.
25	19	"The Trial: Part 1"	Dennie Gordon	David E. Kelley	February 9, 1998	2ABQ12	10.31
Bobby's firm is given a referral by a big law firm to Dr. Jeffrey Winslow when his mistress is found brutally murdered. Due to large retainer that Winslow offers the firm, Bobby accepts the case even though he knows that Helen is the D.A. assigned to the case. Neither lawyer will recuse themselves from the case, putting their personal relationship into jeopardy. Eugene defends Rebecca's irascible uncle on tax evasion charges. To be continued...
26	20	"Cloudy with a Chance of Membranes: Part 2"	Dennie Gordon	David E. Kelley	February 16, 1998	2ABQ13	9.42
The entire episode is dedicated to the Commonwealth V. Winslow murder trial. All of the lawyers of Robert Donnell & Associates are on the case. Helen gets a considerable amount of pressure from her boss to get a win. Tactics used by lawyers on both sides anger Judge Hiller while adding fuel to the war between Bobby and Helen.
27	21	"In Deep"	Oz Scott	David E. Kelley	March 2, 1998	2ABQ14	11.68
The Luis Moreno case finally comes to trial with Rebecca more determined than ever to testify. Ellenor rushes off to defend Warren Cruikshank again, leaving Lindsay to defend a man being cited for using too much water in his toilet. Eugene faces his own prejudices during an altercation with a dry cleaner.
28	22	"Another Day"	Arvin Brown	David E. Kelley	March 9, 1998	2ABQ15	11.60
Bobby is called on to defend Joey Heric on murder charges once again. Lindsay goes up against her former professor, Anderson Pearson, when she represents a client who is addicted to cigarettes. Lindsay sues Pearson himself when she suspects his firm of burying damaging information. Ellenor defends Cruikshank against anti-tourism charges, earning herself several trips to jail when she vehemently disagrees with the judge's decidedly biased position.
29	23	"Checkmate"	Adam Nimoy	David E. Kelley	March 16, 1998	2ABQ16	11.38
Joey's case comes to trial. Ellenor represents a woman heckled by a carnival clown. Bobby recruits Lindsay to second chair Ellenor's case, even though both Lindsay and Ellenor object.
30	24	"Trees in the Forest"	Dwight Little	David E. Kelley & Frank Renzulli	March 30, 1998	2ABQ17	10.79
Lindsay drops a bomb during a staff meeting by asking to have equity in the firm. Bobby takes the request as a threat. Eugene defends a gang member for murder who says it was an accident. Rebecca is being honored for animal rights, but it is at risk because she kills a rat that is loose in the office. Helen gets a hit and run case dropped on her, and her only witness is a homeless person. Helen has to bring it to trial because the case already had been continued too many times.
31	25	"Food Chains"	Stephen Cragg	Ed Redlich & David E. Kelley	April 6, 1998	2ABQ18	12.18
The furor over Lindsay's demand for partnership continues. Bobby discovers that Lindsay's not the only associate looking for another job. Rebecca is involved in a car accident she believes is a scam. Rebecca and Jimmy go undercover to ferret out the guilty. Ellenor meets up with an old friend in the midst of a chimpanzee custody trial.
32	26	"Axe Murderer"	Dennis Smith	David E. Kelley & Todd Ellis Kessler	April 27, 1998	2ABQ19	13.60
Bobby works with Ally McBeal and Billy Thomas (from the law firm of Cage and Fish) to help in the defense of Marie Hanson (Donna Murphy), an apparent axe murderer who may have been Lizzie Borden in a past life. Bobby's infamous "plan B" strategy has shocking results. Ellenor discovers that her new boyfriend, Fred Spivak, is the crooked chiropractor treating Rebecca, while Lindsay and Helen discuss Helen's future with the DA's office. This episode concludes a crossover with Ally McBeal that begins on "The Inmates".
33	27	"Duty Bound"	Elodie Keene	David E. Kelley	May 4, 1998	2ABQ20	12.47
Jimmy's faith in his priest is shaken when Father Ryan is arrested for the murder of a 16-year-old boy. Jimmy desperately tries to track down the real killer before Father Ryan's case goes to trial. Ellenor struggles over her sense of ethics and her blossoming relationship with Fred Spivak.
34	28	"Rhyme and Reason"	Jesus Trevino	David E. Kelley	May 11, 1998	2ABQ21	13.28
Bobby defends a young boy who killed his mother over a seemingly inconsequential argument. Eugene wrestles with his conscience over the morality of his profession and its possible effects on his son, Kendall. Lindsay tries to land a class action asbestos suit.

=== Season 3 (1998–99) ===
No. overall	No. in season	Title	Directed by	Written by	Original release date	Prod. code	Viewers (millions)
35	1	"Passing Go"	Dennis Smith & Michael Schultz	David E. Kelley	September 27, 1998	3P01	11.95
Because he is distracted while girl watching, Bobby gets hit by a car. Meanwhile, Ellenor advises a client to do something that helps to hide the fact that he was drinking. Realizing later that her actions were unethical, she has serious doubts that she is able to keep from crossing that line. Eugene's case deals with a murder where two roommates are in a joint trial, both pointing the finger at the other one. Bobby is still resisting changes that Lindsay is making to the office, prompting him to pay a visit to his father. Rebecca shocks the firm when she announces she's passed the bar exam.
36	2	"Reasons to Believe"	Jace Alexander	Story by : Joseph Telushkin & Allen Estrin and David E. Kelley; Teleplay by : David E. Kelley	October 4, 1998	3P02	13.25
Helen and Lindsay move in together. Rebecca tries her first case, even though most of the firm tries to get her to plead out. Anderson Pearson calls on Bobby and Lindsay to defend him when he's arrested for the murder of a stalker. Helen struggles over a probable cause hearing for a murder, when all they have is a four-year-old child as an eyewitness.
37	3	"Body Count"	Oz Scott	David E. Kelley	October 11, 1998	3P03	12.41
Bobby and Lindsay lay the groundwork for the Pearson trial. George Vogelman, the podiatrist that answered Ellenor's personal ad comes into the office with a severed head in his medicine bag. Ellenor and Eugene try to determine the best course of action. Jimmy and Rebecca defend Jesse Manning, an elderly man accused of plotting to murder his wife.
38	4	"The Defenders"	Dwight Little	David E. Kelley	October 18, 1998	3P04	11.39
Lindsay and Bobby try the case, The Commonwealth V Anderson Pearson. District Attorney Gavin Bullock surprises Bobby with his strategy in how he tries the case. Meanwhile, Ellenor's efforts to build a defense for George Vogelman do not go well, as the police do not investigate other suspects. Pornographic material is found at Vogelman's home, which is sure to be used against him. Eugene is investigating to find other possible suspects, and agrees to take first chair in Vogelman's defense.
39	5	"The Battlefield"	Alex Graves	David E. Kelley	October 25, 1998	3P05	11.72
Lindsay desperately works around the clock on Pearson's appeal, and if necessary, strategy for sentencing. Her efforts in trying to save Pearson start to wear on her. Ellenor tries to find another viable suspect in the Vogelman case. Jimmy represents a cousin being sued by a former employee, fired solely because of her Iranian nationality. In the civil case for wrongful termination, the jury found in favor of the defendant (represented by Jimmy). However, the judge overturned the decision in favor of the plaintiff with the seldom used Judgment Notwithstanding the Verdict" (JNOV).
40	6	"One of Those Days"	Dwight Little	David E. Kelley	November 8, 1998	3P06	10.53
The Commonwealth V Vogelman case is tried. Tensions mount in the firm over strategy, as there is not much to offer for a defense. Eugene does not feel good about using a "plan b" defense. Ellenor's examination of Helen on the witness stand draws ire from Helen, as well as Lindsay and Bobby.
41	7	"Trench Work"	Oz Scott	David E. Kelley	November 15, 1998	3P07	13.17
Bobby fears that Lindsay is too emotionally involved as she takes her last shot at saving Pearson. Steve Robin, who claims the firm slandered him in the Vogelman trial, sues the firm. Eugene strikes an illegal deal with Helen to help his client, Kevin Peete in exchange for damaging information on the Harrelson killer.
42	8	"Swearing In"	Dennis Smith	Alfonso H. Moreno & David E. Kelley	November 29, 1998	3P08	12.17
Rebecca is faced with an ethical dilemma in the days leading up to her swearing-in ceremony; turn in a client she suspects of being a serial killer or fulfill her legal obligation. The firm prepares to defend itself against Tommy Silva, naming Jimmy as lead counsel. Bobby prepares to defend a babysitter against charges that she shook a baby to death.
43	9	"State of Mind"	Adam Nimoy	Jill Goldsmith & David E. Kelley	December 6, 1998	3P09	11.84
Bobby declines Helen's offer of manslaughter, instead forging ahead in the Evelyn Mayfield baby-shaking trial. Rebecca defends young Michael Baylor again, this time on sexual harassment charges. The firm debates whether Jimmy should represent them in the Silva trial. Lucy surprises Bobby with an impulsive kiss.
44	10	"Love and Honor"	Arvin Brown	David E. Kelley	December 13, 1998	3P10	12.01
Robin V Donnell, Young, Dole & Frutt is heard in court. Tensions rise as the firm faces an uphill fight. Jimmy feels that Ellenor and Eugene do not fare well on the witness stand. Ellenor and Eugene are not happy with Jimmy's strategy.
45	11	"Split Decisions"	Michael Schultz	David E. Kelley	January 3, 1999	3P11	14.80
Eugene defends a high school friend, Jerry Green, when Jerry is arrested after a high-ranking politician solicits him for sex. Helen is pressed to go after the politician, destroying Green's life in the process. Ellenor's proposed new client, an asbestos company, is rejected by a partnership vote, enraging Ellenor. Bobby discusses inappropriate questions with Lucy.
46	12	"A Day in the Life"	Martha Mitchell	David E. Kelley & Jill Goldsmith	January 10, 1999	3P12	14.38
Bobby and Eugene travel to a friend's home to counsel him when his daughter's newborn child is smothered. Jimmy and Rebecca have probable cause hearings, while Helen represents the commonwealth in Jimmy's case. Lindsay comes to Jimmy's aid when she sees opportunity to help kick the charges. This is to the dismay of Helen, as she was hoping to escape for the day with Lindsay for a day at the spa.
47	13	"Judge and Jury"	Allan Arkush	David E. Kelley	January 17, 1999	3P13	13.89
Judge Roberta Kittleson, presiding over a case Bobby's working on, informs him that she's had an erotic dream featuring him and proceeds to inquire whether he's interested in her. Bobby responds negatively and worries that it affected Kittleson's judgment when ruling after ruling goes against his client. Helen prosecutes a TV news magazine producer as an accessory for murder after he inadvertently encourages a Kevorkian-like suicide doctor to capture a death on videotape. Lucy teaches Eugene's son, Kendall, to dance.
48	14	"Of Human Bondage"	Dwight Little	Catherine Stribling and David E. Kelley & Jill Goldsmith	February 7, 1999	3P14	11.36
Bobby takes over the defense of a teenage prostitute accused of murder when her previous attorney withdraws, claiming he represents her 'john' (who is also her alibi). Ellenor revisits her past when her very first client is found passed out in a dealer's apartment with a bag of cocaine on his chest. Jimmy cuts a deal with opposing counsel so that both parties in a very bitter divorce get satisfaction.
49	15	"Lawyers, Reporters and Cockroaches"	Dennie Gordon	David E. Kelley	February 21, 1999	3P15	14.68
Tensions boil over at the firm when Ellenor discovers Lindsay's salary is more than double hers. Ellenor approaches Jimmy about partnership, hoping it will give her an ally for voting. Bobby and Lindsay represent a restaurateur forced out of business by a deceptive television reporter. The reporter, under the guise of doing a positive feature, aired an exposé on cockroaches in the kitchen. Helen's plans to enter a quick plea and run off to the spa change after meeting Sylvie Tyler. She then pushes for jail time for a teenager who killed Tyler's cat in a cruel fashion.
50	16	"End Games"	Keith Samples	David E. Kelley	February 28, 1999	3P16	15.97
The office is thrown into turmoil when Ellenor's client Leonard Sowers rushes through the door with policemen giving chase and throws a bag of heroin onto her desk. Ellenor is arrested for possession of the heroin. A proximity search of her desk turns up a bloodied knife which turns out to be the weapon used to murder Susan Robins. The firm is dealt a surprise when Dickie Flood charges Ellenor with first degree murder. Lindsay & Ellenor bury the hatchet when Lindsay takes over her defense. The police, hoping to make another case for the murder, arrest George Vogelman for concealing a murder weapon and perjury. Meanwhile, Bobby defends Judge Kittleson when she's sued by a former clerk claiming sexual harassment. Jimmy is mesmerized by Judge Kittleson's frank sexual discussion.
51	17	"Target Practice"	John Patterson	Cindy Lichtman & Alfonso H. Moreno	March 7, 1999	3P17	15.26
Jimmy (with Lindsay as second chair) represents a couple suing a gun manufacturer for indirectly causing their daughter's death. Jimmy argues that the company targeted advertising at criminals and also circumvented gun laws by selling mail-order build-it-yourself assault weapons. Eugene is stunned to learn his son Kendall is selling drugs. Bobby, Ellenor and Rebecca all work to help Kendall. Eugene is determined to beat the case, and Bobby and Ellenor have to step in to do what is best as lawyers. The incident causes problems with Eugene and his ex-wife over what is best for Kendall.
52	18	"Crossfire"	Dennis Smith	Jill Goldsmith & Alfonso H. Moreno & David E. Kelley	March 14, 1999	3P18	15.11
Young V Young Commonwealth V Strunk Eugene battles his ex-wife Sharon for custody of Kendall. Sharon claims Eugene's profession and questionable tactics are sending the wrong message to their son. Sharon's lawyer uses several of previous storylines against Eugene. Helen prosecutes a young man for stealing a girl's car, but begins to doubt the alleged victim's story when the accused makes a very credible witness. The witness claims she was car-jacked. The accused adamantly maintains that the girl loaned him the car. Rebecca represents a psychologist fired from his job after suffering a head trauma that left him cross-eyed.
53	19	"Closet Justice"	Alex Graves	David E. Kelley	March 28, 1999	3P19	12.97
Judge Hiller assigns Lindsay the repugnant task of defending nun-killer Michael Kingston. Lindsay discovers that the police search that found the body was unconstitutional and, against all her morals, moves that Kingston be released. Helen delivers an impassioned argument, stating that the constitution was designed to protect the innocent, a category that doesn't include Kingston. Jimmy and Rebecca defend a man on solicitation charges, claiming that the undercover officer aroused the man, then announced she was a prostitute. Jimmy and Judge Kittleson arrange a private meeting.
54	20	"Home Invasions"	Jeannot Szwarc	Jill Goldsmith & Alfonso H. Moreno	April 18, 1999	3P20	14.32
Lucy is stunned to learn her landlord has planted video cameras in her apartment and is uploading sensitive videos featuring her onto the Internet. Judge Kittleson is outraged when she finds details of her private life on the 'net, including photos of her and Jimmy. Helen recruits Ellenor to advise a witness when he announces plans to change his story, clearing his father of charges of murdering his mother.
55	21	"Infected"	Dylan McDermott	David E. Kelley	April 25, 1999	3P21	15.81
Helen brings felony murder charges against Gary Armbrust for lying to save his father. Rebecca takes a pro bono case for a man accused of attempted murder. Judge Swackheim makes several decisions that make it tough for Rebecca to try a fair case. Bobby and Eugene work on a wrongful death suit for a woman dying shortly after routine cosmetic surgery.
56	22	"Do Unto Others"	Mel Damski	David E. Kelley	May 2, 1999	3P22	13.19
Commonwealth v. Richard Jacobs Eugene defends a rabbi accused of rape. The rabbi admits a pre-existing relationship with the woman and claims that when she tried to break off the relationship it was merely a means to arouse him. Eugene struggles with ethical questions when it's made known the rabbi had previously been accused of rape.
57	23	"Happily Ever After"	Dwight Little	David E. Kelley	May 9, 1999	3P23	14.57
An unknown assailant that was wearing a nun's outfit during a late night at the office stabs Lindsay. Lindsay manages to utter the word 'nun' to Bobby before she passes out. Based on the information, Helen drags nuns into the courthouse for interrogation, reasoning that a nun upset over Michael (the nun killer) Kingston's acquittal may have committed the crime. Jimmy finds a photo of Lindsay with her image defaced in Judge Kittleson's office and brings a fleet of police to her home.

=== Season 4 (1999–2000) ===
No. overall	No. in season	Title	Directed by	Written by	Original release date	Prod. code	Viewers (millions)
58	1	"Free Dental"	Arvin Brown	David E. Kelley	September 26, 1999	4P01	17.14
Commonwealth v. Henry Olson – Bobby and Jimmy defend a dentist, Dr. Henry Olson, accused of murdering a frequent patient, but eventually discover he's hiding a sordid fetish. Vogelman is back, looking for more legal services. His co-op voted him out of the building because of allegations of killing Susan Robin. The case later leads to Vogelman's inviting Ellenor to his place for dinner. Olson shocks Bobby and Jimmy when he reveals who he's really trying to protect.
59	2	"Boston Confidential"	Alex Graves	David E. Kelley	October 3, 1999	4P02	16.21
Bobby gets a murderer off on a technicality when the arresting officer illegally searches the car and finds the corpse of his wife. Jimmy urges Henry Olson to come forward with what he saw, to try to clear him of murder. When Olson refuses, Jimmy breaks his confidence leading to a devastating conclusion. Bobby discovers the arresting officer and the suspect are lovers who conspired in his wife's murder, which provokes a nasty showdown between Bobby and Lindsay on one side and Helen on the other. Lindsay tells Helen that she is moving out so that she can move in with Bobby. Ellenor suggests that she move in with Helen.
60	3	"Losers Keepers"	Dennis Smith	David E. Kelley & Christopher Mack	October 10, 1999	4P03	17.11
Commonwealth v Ronald Vega Lucy finds an envelope containing a picture of a nun (from the neckline down), holding a Boston Herald, and the paper is dated the day before. This raises suspicions that Lindsay's attacker is alive, getting bolder, and has easy access into the office. Fearful for her life, Ellenor buys an illegal pistol for protection. Jimmy also fears his apartment has been broken into---but when he calls police they're shocked to see who the "intruder" is. Rebecca defends Ronald Vega, a young man who confessed to a hit-and-run accident. Vega recants his confession after the woman who was hit, dies from her injuries. The Vogelman affair comes to a shocking end.
61	4	"Legacy: Part 1"	Dennie Gordon	Todd Ellis Kessler & Jill Goldsmith & David E. Kelley	October 17, 1999	4P04	16.30
Bobby's old mentor, Raymond Oz, calls on Bobby to represent him when his wife tries to have him declared incompetent. Bobby has reservations after observing Oz in a clearly disturbed state of mind. Eugene co-counsels for an incompetent lawyer who has never won a jury trial. Ellenor sinks into depression in the aftermath of the Vogelman affair. Eugene meets the world's worst attorney, Harland Bassett for the first time and has to help him with a case. To be continued...
62	5	"Oz: Part 2"	Michael Zinberg	David E. Kelley	October 24, 1999	4P05	16.51
Commonwealth v Raymond Oz The legendary Raymond Oz works on what will likely be his last case, defending himself for the murder of his wife. Oz works to secure his freedom, as well as his legacy. Bobby and Lindsay stay on as co-counsel. Bobby urges Oz to change his plea to not guilty due to insanity.
63	6	"Marooned"	Jeannot Szwarc	Todd Ellis Kessler & David E. Kelley	November 7, 1999	4P06	18.88
Rebecca and Eugene defend Jan Carlson who is accused of killing her mother. Carlson claims she suffers from flashbacks involving child molestation by her father and that her mother knew. Carlson's sister claims she was not molested. Lindsay and Bobby argue over wedding dresses. Jan's acquittal leads to a tragic consequence.
64	7	"Victimless Crimes"	James Frawley	David E. Kelley & Samantha Howard Corbin	November 14, 1999	4P07	18.85
Commonwealth v Darlene Keating Jimmy represents Keating for murdering her rapist. It turns out to be an uphill fight when Keating refuses to say she was temporarily insane at the time. Lucy accuses her dentist, who also happens to be Bobby's cousin, of sexual battery. When the dentist seeks out Bobby for legal counsel, Lucy becomes more frustrated when it appears that Bobby is willing to defend him.
65	8	"Committed"	Arvin Brown	David E. Kelley & Todd Ellis Kessler	November 21, 1999	4P08	15.99
Richard Bay salivates at the prospect of going after Eugene's son Kendall, his mother's lover is found dead in her bed. Ellenor is the attorney of record for Kendall. Lindsay tries the petition of Walter "The Hummer" Arens, a man who was found not guilty of five murders by reason of insanity. The five victims were all women and were stabbed. Arens spent 20 years in a mental facility and petitions to be let out, claiming he is cured.
66	9	"Bay of Pigs"	Oz Scott	David E. Kelley	November 28, 1999	4P09	14.24
Ellenor takes on Richard Bay in a case wherein an elder lady is accused of attempting to run over her husband in her car. The woman claims it was an accident when her car accelerator jumped. Bay and Ellenor clash both in and out of court, with Bay continuing to reveal both questionable attitudes, a potential for real misconduct---and the boyhood experiences that animate his Napoleonic complex. Jimmy re-evaluates his relationship with Judge Kittleson---and begins re-evaluating his religious convictions---when he represents an old girlfriend in a suit regarding the sale of reproductive eggs, and discovers he and the woman may still have feelings for each other.
67	10	"Day in Court"	Dennis Smith	Story by : Mark Silver & David E. Kelley; Teleplay by : David E. Kelley	December 12, 1999	4P10	13.32
Tempers flare over a particularly tough case. Bobby defends old client, drug dealer Eddie Wick against the murder of an addict. Eddie claims it is self-defense. D.A. Helen brings the coroner to testify that it wasn't. Bobby and Wick almost come to blows when Wick suggests Bobby's no better morally than he is. The coroner's testimony is damaged by prior odd behavior. Eddie attacks Helen to try to force the judge into a mistrial. Bobby & Swackheim nearly come to blows. Each of the participants, Bobby, Helen & Swackheim, expresses their outrage and disillusionment with the legal system.
68	11	"Blowing Smoke"	Jeannot Szwarc	David E. Kelley & Samantha Howard Corbin	January 9, 2000	4P11	19.22
Lindsay sues a cigar company for breaking up a friend's marriage. She alleges that the husband's addiction was the deciding factor in the divorce. Rebecca gives legal help to her ex-boyfriend and Boston police officer Armstrong of murder. Armstrong shot and killed a teenage boy in a grocery store claiming he saw a gun. The cashier says otherwise.
69	12	"New Evidence: Part 1"	Michael Zinberg	David E. Kelley	January 30, 2000	4P12	23.85
Lindsay takes the firm to Los Angeles to defend an acquaintance who is on trial for murdering his on-line girlfriend. As evidence mounts against their client, Bobby and the rest deal with a controlling judge, an antagonistic detective and the victim's sister, a nun with issues. To be continued... Note: This episode aired after the Super Bowl; Los Angeles was chosen as the setting due to its lack of an NFL team. It remained the series' most-watched episode for the rest of the series' run.
70	13	"Hammerhead Sharks: Part 2"	Dwight Little & Dennis Smith	David E. Kelley	February 6, 2000	4P14	22.76
California v Mills Dennis Mills maintains his innocence. The firm continues the trial, striving against all odds to exonerate Mills. Lindsay struggles to look for a hail mary to try to save Mills.
71	14	"Checkmates"	Andy Wolk	Alfonso H. Moreno & Jill Goldsmith and David E. Kelley	February 13, 2000	4P13	19.65
Ellenor defends a 'slow' teenager accused of killing a younger boy. A witness comes forward claiming to have information exonerating her client, but Ellenor suspects he's lying. Helen calls in a police officer when his son is under suspicion in a homicide. Representing the accused, Bobby argues the officer was acting as an agent of the court, not a father.
72	15	"Race Ipsa Loquitor"	Alex Graves	David E. Kelley	February 20, 2000	4P15	21.68
Jimmy is tempted to compromise his integrity to get convicted murderer (and insect admirer) Henry Olson released. Eugene and Rebecca represent a woman who is suing a plastic surgeon when her husband dies during a liposuction procedure. They soon realize they're as much on trial as the surgeon when the opposing attorney makes several references to their race. Richard and Jimmy make a deal to free Henry.
73	16	"Settling"	Arvin Brown	Todd Ellis Kessler	March 12, 2000	4P16	21.15
A red flag is raised when Bobby does not show up for a deposition. Little does the firm know that Bobby has been kidnapped by a former client named Patrick Rooney (Donnie Wahlberg). Rooney, who spent 12 years in prison all the while maintaining his innocence, blames Bobby for his incarceration.
74	17	"Black Widows"	Mel Damski	David E. Kelley	April 2, 2000	4P17	20.15
Bobby defends the so-called 'Black Widow', a woman who is accused of murdering her recently deceased husband and whose two previous spouses also died mysteriously. Helen lies to a 15-year-old girl who killed her unborn child, coercing her into giving a statement.
75	18	"Death Penalties"	Keith Samples	Story by : David E. Kelley & Alfonso H. Moreno; Teleplay by : David E. Kelley	April 9, 2000	4P18	20.12
Bobby and Helen clash in an assisted suicide case. Helen remains haunted by her grandmother's death, while Bobby remembers his experiences of 'pulling the plug' on his mother and feels almost as though he were on trial now. Anxious to ease Bobby's remaining pain and keep it from soiling the trial, Lindsay discovers Bobby's otherwise gentle father has never talked about his mother's death with him. Meanwhile, Ellenor flies to Pennsylvania to see if there are possibilities that could exonerate a 31-year-old death row inmate who claims to be innocent of a double homicide.
76	19	"Till Death Do Us Part: Part 1"	Duane Clark	Alfonso H. Moreno and Adam Armus & Kay Foster and David E. Kelley	April 30, 2000	4P19	16.90
Ellenor pursues the Stuart Donovan case, hoping to forestall his execution while having also to keep his determined mother from alienating people who may be able to help the new probe. Meanwhile, Rebecca's case representing a woman with Alzheimer's trying to keep her marriage from being annulled becomes complicated when questions arise about the death of her client's first husband. Ellenor discovers two witnesses in the original Donovan trial were tainted. To be continued...
77	20	"Liberty Bells: Part 2"	Michael Schultz	David E. Kelley & Alfonso H. Moreno	May 7, 2000	4P20	21.69
Time and options to prevent his execution begin running short for Stuart Donovan. Eugene, Jimmy and Lucy join Ellenor in Pennsylvania to help investigate, and look for a last-minute miracle to save Donovan's life. Shaking away clashes with the case's recalcitrant and possibly politically-motivated prosecutor, they find their miracle---from a surprising and heartbreaking source. But they must still convince the case's aging, exhausted judge.
78	21	"The Honorable Man"	Dennis Smith	David E. Kelley	May 14, 2000	4P21	18.14
Eugene is disgusted by his client, a homeless man accused of murdering a woman and raping her corpse. Jimmy represents an old friend who is being sued for notifying employees that one of their co-workers has AIDS.
79	22	"Life Sentence"	Michael Zinberg	David E. Kelley	May 21, 2000	4P22	23.18
Commonwealth v Burg Ellenor defends a deaf woman who shot and killed the man who allegedly murdered and raped her young daughter. The client's crime is captured on video in front of dozens of witnesses, leaving no doubt as to who committed the act. The only to way to exonerate the client is to manipulate the jury's heartstrings. Meanwhile Lindsay learns that Bobby hates weddings and decides to spring a surprise elopement.

=== Season 5 (2000–01) ===
No. overall	No. in season	Title	Directed by	Written by	Original release date	Prod. code	Viewers (millions)
80	1	"Summary Judgements"	Arvin Brown	David E. Kelley	October 8, 2000	5ABQ01	16.36
Commonwealth v Wallace Bobby doesn't want client Scott Wallace to testify to avoid introducing videotape that could be perceived as an admission of guilt. Helen and Richard Bay may have coached a witness. Helen believes that witnessed lied. Ellenor and Lindsay represent a parent whose three children have all contracted learning disabilities.
81	2	"Germ Warfare"	Duane Clark	David E. Kelley	October 15, 2000	5ABQ02	18.47
Bobby struggles to overturn the guilty verdict in the Scott Wallace case. Bobby's refusal to allow Wallace to testify may be grounds for a new trial. Ellenor and Lindsay continue their attack against the EPA, but a hostile judge may thwart their efforts. Helen faces a crisis when doing the right thing over Richard's coercion of a witness may cost her a job.
82	3	"Officers of the Court"	Jeannot Szwarc	David E. Kelley & Peter Blake	October 22, 2000	5ABQ03	19.30
Ellenor continues the Jamison case, challenging Judge Aldrich's decision to cut her client's award. Jimmy is upset when he learns that former client Jennifer Cole is pregnant and has been arrested for possession of cocaine. He conspires with the D.A. to install Jennifer in a rehab program. Bobby continues to work Scott Wallace's appeal. Helen faces alienation from her colleagues in the wake of her unpopular actions in the Wallace trial---especially Richard, who still refuses to admit he coerced Kyle Barret's perjury in the Wallace trial.
83	4	"Appeal and Denial"	Dennis Smith	David E. Kelley & Lukas Reiter	October 29, 2000	5ABQ04	18.50
Bobby takes the Scott Wallace case to appeals, hopefully proving that Kyle Barrett perjured himself. Helen faces Rebecca in the courtroom in an emotional case when an abused spouse claims that she was mistaken in identifying her husband as her attacker. Bobby and Lindsay announce that they're expecting a child but Lindsay suspects she may not be the only pregnant woman in the office.
84	5	"We Hold These Truths"	Duane Clark	David E. Kelley & Jonathan Shapiro	November 5, 2000	5ABQ05	18.08
Eugene defends a man accused of murder in a trial where the outcome hinges on the honesty of a police officer who has been living a lie. Jimmy confronts a judge whose propensity for giving moral lectures to defendants has made him a laughingstock. Bobby continues preparations for the Scott Wallace retrial. This time the case is in Judge Hiller's courtroom. Helen delivers shocking news to Eugene after the trail verdict. Jimmy's judge jails him for contempt after Jimmy can't help laughing at one of the judge's lectures.
85	6	"Show and Tell"	Alex Graves	David E. Kelley	November 12, 2000	5ABQ06	19.65
The long-awaited Scott Wallace retrial, during which participants consent to television interviews throughout the trial, begins. In the interviews, an increasingly agitated Richard crosses ethical lines while further betraying his hunger for winning before justice, while Bobby inadvertently betrays his weariness with the criminal justice system. More pressing for both sides in the case: Wallace's original video confession, suppressed in the first trial, is admitted as evidence this time, forcing a very reluctant Bobby to put a shaky Wallace himself on the witness stand.
86	7	"Brothers' Keepers"	Arvin Brown	Story by : Alfonso H. Moreno, Peter Blake, Adam Armus & Kay Foster; Teleplay by : David E. Kelley & Alfonso H. Moreno	November 19, 2000	5ABQ07	18.17
Bobby defends a man on trial for allowing his wife to be murdered in an 'honor killing'; an ancient cultural ritual used to punish adulterous behavior. Eugene reluctantly aids incompetent attorney Harland Bassett yet again. Ellenor announces that she's pregnant, encountering some adversity.
87	8	"Mr. Hinks Goes to Town"	Jeannot Szwarc	David E. Kelley	November 26, 2000	5ABQ08	19.23
Lindsay defends a psychiatric patient who claims to be a serial killer. His psychiatrist claims he's only a disturbed individual looking for a little notoriety.
88	9	"The Deal"	Daniel Attias	David E. Kelley & Peter Blake	December 10, 2000	5ABQ09	20.00
Scott Wallace, William Hinks, and a high profile kidnapping case converge to make this one of the most explosive episode of The Practice thus far. First, Bobby is forced to choose between his responsibilities to his client and the life of a 7-year-old girl when his client knows the kidnapped girl's whereabouts but refuses to divulge her location unless he receives a cushy plea bargain. William Hinks, the acquitted serial killer, begins stalking Lindsay. Meanwhile, an increasingly agitated Scott Wallace is fired from his job and tries to convince his employer that he deserves to be rehired.
89	10	"Friends and Ex-Lovers"	Michael Zinberg	David E. Kelley & Lukas Reiter	December 17, 2000	5ABQ10	19.39
Scott Wallace is near the edge as the firm prepares to try helping him re-gain his job. Despite a restraining order, William Hinks continues to harass Lindsay, as more questions arise as to whether or not he's the real serial killer. Jimmy and Ellenor meet with Wallace and his former employer and longtime friend---with deadly results. Bobby blames himself for those results.
90	11	"An Early Frost"	Christina M. Musrey	David E. Kelley	January 7, 2001	5ABQ11	18.94
After Scott Wallace kills his friend, Ellenor and Jimmy have different takes on just how it happened---and Jimmy becomes a witness for the prosecution. Bobby, meanwhile, is still defending Wallace. Lindsay is convinced that serial killer William Hinks has claimed another victim, and fears for her own life. To protect her, Bobby takes matters into his own hands---with no idea just how it will backfire on him.
91	12	"Payback"	Andy Wolk	David E. Kelley & Marc Guggenheim	January 14, 2001	5ABQ12	20.62
Bobby is arrested for conspiring to murder serial killer William Hinks after his former client---whom Bobby only asked to "put the fear of God" into Hinks---broke into Hinks's home and murdered him. The entire firm, with Eugene at the helm, must now rally to defend him. In the DA's office, Helen and even Richard disapprove of the designated prosecutor treating the case like a political battle to get a contentious defender instead of a pure criminal case. Meanwhile, Rebecca discovers foul play in the wrongful death suit of a friend's husband.
92	13	"The Thin Line"	Dennis Smith	David E. Kelley & Lynne E. Litt	February 4, 2001	5ABQ13	18.80
Tensions at the firm are at an all-time high when Bobby is tried for the murder of William Hinks. Bobby holds up under the pressure on the witness stand, to the point where even his cross-examination appears to go in his favour. Lucy's first case as a rape crisis counselor leaves her distraught---until the victim visits the firm's office to thank Lucy personally. Bobby is acquitted, though there is little to celebrate when a mysterious cassette recorder is sent to the office. Lucy and Rebecca hear Hinks' voice on the recorder, just before it triggers an explosion.
93	14	"The Day After"	Alex Graves	David E. Kelley	February 11, 2001	5ABQ14	23.08
Unconscious and in critical need of blood, Rebecca's fate is left to a higher power when her mother refuses to allow a transfusion because of the family's religious beliefs. Bobby is awestruck when Lindsay gives birth to their son a month early. Kevin Riley asks Ellenor Frutt to represent him in a school board meeting when he's fired from Winslow High. This episode begins a crossover with Boston Public that concludes in "Chapter Thirteen".
94	15	"Awakenings"	Charles McClelland	David E. Kelley & Lukas Reiter	February 18, 2001	5ABQ15	20.65
Ellenor's chosen "sperm donor", Michael Hale (Ted McGinley), has second thoughts about the agreement over the rearing of her soon-to-be-born child. Meanwhile, Rebecca emerges from the I.C.U. and gets lost in the hospital. Additionally, Helen prepares to prosecute the rape of an eleven-year-old girl.
95	16	"Gideon's Crossover"	Michael Schultz	Story by : David E. Kelley, Peter Blake, Lynne E. Litt & Wendy West; Teleplay by : David E. Kelley, Peter Blake & Lynne E. Litt	March 11, 2001	5ABQ16	19.11
Helen prosecutes an accused rapist, while doing her best to keep the 11-year-old victim off the witness stand. Ellenor has complications with her pregnancy and is treated by Dr. Ben Gideon. This episode begins a crossover with Gideon's Crossing that concludes on "Flashpoint".
96	17	"What Child is This?"	Steve Gomer	David E. Kelley & Lynne E. Litt	March 18, 2001	5ABQ17	19.72
Bobby and Jimmy employ the firm's notorious "Plan B" strategy in a last-ditch effort to save a client accused of raping and murdering his teen-aged stepdaughter. Bobby makes a case that the client's wife is actually the murderer. Meanwhile, Ellenor goes into labor with only a panicky Helen there to assist her. Bobby is quietly shamed in Judge Heller's chambers when the judge declares she's lost respect for him over his gambit. Ellenor delivers a healthy daughter. The verdict in Bobby and Jimmy's trial leads to a shocking implied revelation.
97	18	"The Confession"	Andy Wolk	Story by : Lukas Reiter; Teleplay by : David E. Kelley & Lukas Reiter	April 1, 2001	5ABQ18	17.89
Despite her prior outrage over Richard coercing testimony from Kyle Barrett in the original Scott Wallace case, Helen uses trickery---including falsely hinting Massachusetts' pending passage of the death penalty and the state's governor being outside the interrogation room---to coerce a confession from an alleged carjacker represented by Jimmy. While Helen feels that her means were legal and necessary to get a dangerous man off the streets, Jimmy and Eugene disagree. The carjacker is freed in court only to be arrested by the FBI. Jimmy and Eugene ask a federal judge to rule the confession inadmissible, a decision that would set the carjacker free again.
98	19	"Home of the Brave"	Keith Samples	Story by : Marc Guggenheim, Lynne E. Litt, David E. Kelley, Adam Armus & Kay Foster; Teleplay by : David E. Kelley & Lynne E. Litt & Adam Armus & Kay Foster	April 22, 2001	5ABQ19	18.00
Lindsay presses Richard Bay to explain a questionable arrest of her client, who is an illegal alien. She ultimately discovers that the police planted drugs on her client, in order to force him to testify in a murder trial. The client refuses to testify, as the murderer is his own brother, whom he believes would kill their mother if accused. The client allows himself to be deported to Colombia. Meanwhile, Lucy's actions as a rape counselor are called into question during a date rape trial, when the suspect's attorney suggests she urged the victim to charge rape falsely.
99	20	"The Case of Harland Basset"	Daniel Attias	Alfonso H. Moreno & Peter Blake	April 29, 2001	5ABQ20	16.89
Eugene and Jimmy agree to help the mistake-prone Harland Bassett (Ernie Sabella) in the case of a young girl who developed liver damage from an antibiotic. With the odds stacked against them, the trio take on a politically tied, deep-pocketed drug manufacturer.
100	21	"Poor Richard's Almanac"	Jeannot Szwarc	Jill Goldsmith & Lukas Reiter & Jonathan Shapiro	May 6, 2001	5ABQ21	17.22
Richard Bay prosecutes Jackie Cahill, a drug operator facing murder charges and life because of his prior convictions whom Bobby defends reluctantly. Cahill can't control his arrogance and implicit threats---including to intimidate the prosecution's key witness, a courier who saw the shooting while seated in his vehicle. Richard tries not to remain unnerved after an unknown man pins him in his garage at gunpoint and warns him off trying for a conviction in the case. During a mid-trial plea deal meeting between Cahill, Bobby and Ellenor, and Richard and Helen, Cahill first challenges Helen sexually and then threatens Richard almost explicitly. After Cahill's conviction, Bobby tells him to find another lawyer for appeals. Using an elderly woman behind the wheel to throw Richard off guard a moment by asking about his leaving his parking spot, an unseen gunman waits for Richard to climb into his car before firing.
101	22	"Public Servants"	Dennis Smith	David E. Kelley	May 13, 2001	5ABQ22	21.02
The firm are as outraged by Richard's execution as Helen, who's determined to punish Jackie Cahill and all other responsible parties. She makes a deal with Cahill, offering him immunity on Bay's murder plus the added bonus that she won't announce that he's a snitch and release him into the general prison population if he gives up the shooter. He agrees. Distraught over Richard's murder, Bobby wants to take an indefinite absence from work to sort things out. After Richard's killer is killed by police, Helen reneges on the deal, claiming Jackie hasn't fulfilled the terms of the agreement. Jackie's lawyer protests and drags Helen into court. However, because Jackie threatened to put a 'hit' on Helen from within prison after she reneged on the deal, the judge adds 75 years to each of Jackie's counts, meaning he will be up for parole in 150 years. Meanwhile, Rebecca and Jimmy defend a man on charges that he strangled his wife. Rebecca is adamant about the man's innocence, arguing that the only reason he's being prosecuted is because he was stunned by his wife's death and gave the investigating officer erroneous information. Rebecca and Jimmy are shocked to later learn that their client has a history of strangling both women and chickens.

=== Season 6 (2001–02) ===
No. overall	No. in season	Title	Directed by	Written by	Original release date	Prod. code	Viewers (millions)
102	1	"The Candidate"	Jeannot Szwarc	David E. Kelley	September 23, 2001	6P01	17.83
103	2	"The Candidate"	Jeannot Szwarc	David E. Kelley	September 23, 2001	6P01	17.83
A sensational homicide case rocks Boston in the series' two-hour, sixth-season opener, when a man is found dead in the bed of charismatic state senator Keith Ellison, a longtime friend and client of Ellenor's. The original presumption is that Ellison came home early from an outing with his reticent daughter, Allison, and believed his intransigent wife Marsha under assault, prompting him to kill the assailant. Pretrial drama centers on the accounts of two key witnesses: Marsha and Allison Ellison. Courtroom skirmishes are interwoven with the sometimes contentious strategizing of prosecutor Helen and her new associate, Alan Lowe, who soon displays a penchant for unscrupulosity above and beyond anything the late Richard Bay or other prosecutors ever did; and, squabbling on the defense team, led by Ellenor, who soon learns a surprising truth about Keith.
104	3	"Killing Time"	Daniel Attias	Jonathan Shapiro & Lukas Reiter & Peter Blake & David E. Kelley	September 30, 2001	6P02	17.77
Ellenor first thinks that Marsha is guilty of the crime for which her husband was convicted and goes to Keith, now in prison, urging him to come forward. Keith refuses, leading to a pair of jarring revelations one of which may involve daughter Allison. Meanwhile, Eugene Young represents parole candidate Leonard Marshall (Charles Dutton), insisting his best chance for parole is to confess and beg forgiveness. During the parole hearing, Leonard refuses to admit guilt, though the parole board still sets him free. Concurrently, Rebecca assists a powerful attorney Bobby has admired, John Mockler (guest star Ron Silver), who is famous for fighting death penalty cases---only to discover Mockler picks only cases he believes worthy while urging otherwise doomed clients to find religion, unnerving Rebecca who believes every person should get a full, complete defense no matter the case. When she convinces Bobby about Mocker's dubious approaches, they try for a stay of execution in Mockler's latest case---but they fail.
105	4	"Liar's Poker"	Dwight Little	Gardner Stern and Lukas Reiter & Jonathan Shapiro	October 7, 2001	6P03	16.02
Lindsay represents a young man, Martin Jenks, accused of murder. There is only one eyewitness in the case, but Lindsay doesn't believe that she can keep Jenks out of jail. She goes to A.D.A. Alan Lowe and offers a plea bargain, but the deal is rejected. After the eyewitness dies unexpectedly, Lowe then decides to accept the original plea bargain. Lindsay has difficulty convincing her client to plead guilty, but he reluctantly accepts the offer and gets the five-year sentence. When Lindsay discovers that Lowe tricked her, she goes back to the judge and argues that her client should be set free. In a closed-door meeting in the judge's chambers, the judge says that he cannot free Jenks. But the judge also chastises Alan Lowe and D.A. Kenneth Walsh for their unethical behavior. Meanwhile, Jimmy represents a seedy client, Sid Herman (Jeffrey Tambor), who is a bookie. Jimmy has incurred a serious gambling debt, and represents Sid in a hostile divorce as a way of paying off the debt. When Sid's wife is murdered, Sid is charged with the crime.
106	5	"Vanished: Part 1"	Arvin Brown	Story by : Kathy McCormick & Crystal Nix Hines; Teleplay by : Crystal Nix-Hines	October 14, 2001	6P04	15.24
Bobby represents a couple, the Baldwins, who are haunted by the kidnapping of their son 18 years earlier and believe John Pierce---serving a prison sentence for child molestation---is the kidnapper. At the time of the disappearance, Pierce was a suspect, but the police did not have enough evidence to charge him with the kidnapping. The Baldwins believe their son was murdered, and they just want to know the location of the body. They persuade Bobby to bring a wrongful-death civil lawsuit against Pierce, believing the suit will compel Pierce to reveal the body's location. On the witness stand, Pierce insists that he did not kidnap the boy. At the end of the episode, Bobby is approached by a young man who believes that he is the boy who was kidnapped years ago---accompanied by Allison Tucker, the woman who raised him. Meanwhile, after Sid the bookie threatens Jimmy seriously, Jimmy "borrows" money from a client's trust fund. He uses the money to bet on a horse tipped to him by a relative, and he wins enough to pay back the bookie. Jimmy returns the client's money, but not before Eugene and Bobby discover his reckless action. To be continued...
107	6	"Vanished: Part 2"	Duane Clark	Gardner Stern	October 21, 2001	6P05	16.34
Now known as James Tucker, Chad Baldwin, the boy who was kidnapped 18 years ago, shows up at Bobby's office, along with the woman who raised him, Allison. She claims that Pierce "left" the boy with her, claiming that the child was his own son. Allison agrees to testify as part of the trial against Pierce, and can provide crucial testimony to keep him behind bars. But she is worried that she could also be charged as an accessory to the crime, so she first cuts an immunity deal with the district attorney's office. After she testifies, however, unsettling news is uncovered: Allison's sister tells Rebecca Allison suffered several miscarriages and once threatened to steal a baby from a hospital. Bobby now believes that Allison is the real kidnapper who framed Pierce. He shares this news with the Baldwins, who ask that Bobby not tell the district attorney the truth. They are desperate to restore their relationship with their estranged son, and are afraid of attacking the woman who raised him. In the end, Pierce accepts a plea bargain for seven more years in prison, as he knows the case against him is overwhelming.
108	7	"Honor Code"	Jeannot Szwarc	David E. Kelley & Lukas Reiter	November 18, 2001	6P06	15.62
Bobby, Eugene and Jimmy work with an insurance company to settle the claim of a 10-year-old accident victim. But the case presents a dilemma of moral and ethical proportions, when Jimmy and the firm learn from the insurance company's own head physician that the boy faces a life-threatening artery issue. Overwhelmed by his conscience, Jimmy calls an ambulance to the boy's home and tells his parents of his danger, after which the boy undergoes successful surgery---but Jimmy faces disbarment for violating attorney-client privilege, and the tension brewing between Jimmy and Eugene since the trust fund withdrawal finally boils over. After taking over from Ellenor in his hearing before a panel of judges including Judge Heller, and arguing passionately on behalf of trying to save a human life, Jimmy escapes with a three-week suspension but nothing more severe---and it leads to a rapprochement with Eugene.
109	8	"Suffer the Little Children"	Dennis Smith	Lynne E. Litt & James Solomon	November 25, 2001	6P07	15.26
Lindsay is assigned a case involving a mentally challenged man who was released from prison after DNA evidence exonerated him of the murder of his wife. The man is searching for his daughter, who believed that he murdered his wife, her mother. Ellenor is working on a gang killing case in which Alan Lowe is using unscrupulous tactics---so much so that he alienates Helen---in order to get the former-gang member's family to turn on him, tactics that endanger a suspect's family. The victim's family, however, sees Alan's gambit far differently.
110	9	"Dangerous Liaisons"	Andy Wolk	David E. Kelley	December 2, 2001	6P08	15.93
Bobby has feelings for a client (Gabrielle Anwar) accused of murder. Lucy counsels an octogenarian rape victim, who then takes vengeance on her rapist.
111	10	"Inter Arma Silent Leges"	David Semel	Story by : Jonathan Shapiro & Lukas Reiter; Teleplay by : Jonathan Shapiro	December 9, 2001	6P09	15.14
Eugene and Helen are against each other in a case. Eugene's client insists on an argument that hinges on the existence of "Cross Racial Impairment", a psychological condition proposed by one of Eugene's witnesses. Rebecca represents an American of Middle Eastern descent who is being held in against his will in something like Kafka's The Trial.
112	11	"Eyewitness"	Duane Clark	David E. Kelley & Peter Blake	January 6, 2002	6P10	15.40
Lindsay and Jimmy defend a man accused of killing a woman's husband. A minister tells Lindsay and Jimmy that one of his congregants committed the murder. Ellenor defends someone who is accused of being a repeat thief; the DA on the case, Mitchell, sexually harasses Ellenor. The major theme of the episode is about corruption within the system and why the process is important.
113	12	"The Test"	Christina M. Musrey	Lukas Reiter	January 13, 2002	6P11	15.62
Bobby and Eugene defend Russell Hampton, a man who was shot in a drug feud. Bobby, believing Russell to be dead, tells the police about the feud. Russell attacks Bobby. Lindsay tries to get a DNA test for one of her first clients who is now serving time in prison for multiple rapings. The theme in this episode is biological (blood and DNA) identification, and how these tests alone do not necessarily indicate guilt or innocence.
114	13	"Pro Se"	Michael Zinberg	Jonathan Shapiro	February 10, 2002	6P12	12.25
Bobby deals with having been attacked by one of his clients, Russell Hampton, from the last episode. He tries with limited success to keep a brave face until, in a private moment with Lindsay, he admits his fear and considers leaving criminal defense. Ellenor defends a man named Ray (who wants to defend himself) who is accused of murdering someone while in prison. Ray mounts a surprisingly effective defense on his own half---but delivers a surprise of his own before the verdict comes in. The theme in this episode is about how prison and the prospect of serving time makes one desperate, and that defense attorneys put themselves in danger by interacting with those who have little to lose.
115	14	"Judge Knot"	Dennie Gordon	Story by : Crystal Nix Hines; Teleplay by : Jeff Rake	February 17, 2002	6P13	10.58
Bobby and Helen are called by the US Attorneys office to pull a sting on the much admired but possibly corrupt Judge Charles Fleming, the morning after the firm and Helen attend a testimonial for the longtime jurist. We learn fifteen attorneys are suspected in a scheme involving Fleming resolving cases their way for payoffs of several thousand dollars per case. Bobby finally agrees to participate and learns what he doesn't want to learn about Fleming. The sting works and Fleming is caught---with a tragic conclusion. Helen shows Bobby the files on the suspect attorneys---now including his own, likely added by Fleming as payback for the sting---then shreds Bobby's file.
116	15	"Man and Superman"	Jeannot Szwarc	Lukas Reiter & Jonathan Shapiro	February 24, 2002	6P14	10.04
Jimmy and Lindsay represent an old friend of Jimmy's, an accountant whose inability to live up to his wife's ambitions for him broke him mentally---to the point where he believes he's Superman. One day he jumped through a window believing he was flying to rescue his wife and landed upon a man who died in the accident and whose widow wants him held accountable. Jimmy and Lindsay sue the hospital on the man's behalf. Concurrently, Bobby searches for a baby sitter with dubious results until the others at the firm step in to help.
117	16	"M. Premie Unplugged"	Dennis Smith	John Tinker	March 10, 2002	6P15	11.75
Fallout from the death of Judge Fleming and Bobby having worked with the US Attorneys office. Eugene and Rebecca defend a man whose daughter is on life support, and whose wife has control over the disconnecting of life support due to him being accused of shaking the baby to near-death. But Eugene fears the judge holds the Fleming sting against the firm's attorneys. The case turns when the baby suffers a seizure while the wife visits her in intensive care and is revealed to have an illness with effects similar to those left by shaken-baby syndrome, casting suspicion now upon the attending doctor who testified during the trial. Mitchell, the DA who sexually harassed Ellenor, visits her to apologise again more personally---and reveal he's left his job over his remorse. We learn Mitchell and Ellenor have been friends for a long time, even having gone to school together. After they spend a night together, Mitchell decides to leave Boston awhile to sort his life out. The baby's parents reconcile.
118	17	"Manifest Necessity"	Christina M. Musrey	Peter Blake	March 17, 2002	6P16	13.27
Bobby and Jimmy go against Helen and Kenneth Walsh in a case where the defendant has a background in organized crime and won his last case, 12 years prior, against Walsh. The question of prosecutorial misconduct is the crux of this episode, especially when Helen suspects Walsh is less than scrupulous for the truth after the prosecution's key witness is murdered. Lindsay defends an old man who wants to go to prison because he lacks medical insurance---and misleadingly claims Lindsay instructed him to rob a bank.
119	18	"Fire Proof"	Andy Wolk	Jonathan Shapiro	April 7, 2002	6P17	12.93
Jimmy and Bobby defend a manufacturer who's an old admired friend of Jimmy's father but is now accused of torching his plant to collect the insurance. Walsh suspects the man of past money laundering for organised crime, but Helen suspects Walsh is coercing witnesses, while Jimmy comes to see the defendant in a different and troubling light. Concurrently, a young tech whiz with a crush on Lucy is charged with wire fraud by the FBI over a chain letter he passed onward.
120	19	"The Return of Joey Heric"	Dwight Little	David E. Kelley	April 14, 2002	6P18	11.60
Joey Heric arrives at the office and announces he's become a lawyer, unnerving the firm even after Ellenor and Bobby agree to help his first murder trial. Jimmy's former client Jennifer, a prostitute, accuses a lawyer of raping her. The firm triumphs for her---but the truth proves a lot more jarring. Heric appears to be winning his case with clever questioning and a clever closing argument, but Ellenor and Bobby slowly realise he's the same narcissistic manipulator he always was and needed them for appearances mostly while potentially damaging his case.
121	20	"Eat and Run"	Dennis Smith	David E. Kelley	May 5, 2002	6P19	11.46
The firm defends Lawrence O'Malley, a man who believes he is Hannibal Lecter and who has to be restrained and muzzled during his trial proceedings after he attacked his previous attorney. O'Malley threatens Lindsay, who is especially upset because she was stabbed a few years ago, and refers to her continuously as "Clarice." Bobby does a poor job on his closing so Eugene steps in and finishes it. The defendant is acquitted of all murder charges. Lindsay and Bobby admit to having problems within their relationship.
122	21	"Evil-Doers"	Andy Wolk	David E. Kelley	May 12, 2002	6P20	11.69
A continuation of the Eat and Run storyline. O'Malley calls Lindsay, and she gets a restraining order. But she also confronts him after a post-verdict hearing telling him she'll kill him if he comes near her. Eugene and Jimmy try a case defending a man accused of rape who has a twin brother, claiming to be the real rapist. O'Malley shows up at the Donnells' home, violating the restraining order. After Bobby threatens to remove him from their apartment physically, a terrified Lindsay shoots him.
123	22	"This Pud's for You"	Jeannot Szwarc	David E. Kelley	May 19, 2002	6P21	14.90
A continuation of the Eat and Run storyline. O'Malley died in the shooting, and Lindsay is arrested for murder. Rebecca defends a man who nicknamed his penis "Pud" or "Pugsley", accused of rape and murder. The Pugsley fellow's victim shows up on a video tape. Walsh all but admits to Ellenor pre-trial that he's gunning to bring the firm down and doesn't really care why Lindsay shot O'Malley. Bobby and Lindsay's relationship starts to crumble under the stress. Despite Walsh's attempt to force Lindsay to outside representation, the firm is allowed to defend her---and they rely upon a Battered Woman Syndrome instead of self defense.
124	23	"The Verdict"	Dennis Smith	David E. Kelley	May 19, 2002	6P22	14.90
A continuation of the Eat and Run storyline. The firm's narcissistic nemesis Joey Heric has a short but damaging cameo on the Larry King show after Ellenor appeared previously to discuss the case against Lindsay. With the firm continuing to press battered woman syndrome as a defense and not making O'Malley's threats and restraining order violation more central, Lindsay is convicted of murder. Her stress pushes her beyond the breaking point.

=== Season 7 (2002–03) ===
No. overall	No. in season	Title	Directed by	Written by	Original release date	Prod. code	Viewers (millions)
125	1	"Privilege"	Dennis Smith	David E. Kelley	September 29, 2002	7ABQ01	13.89
Lindsay is sentenced to life imprisonment. Harvard Law graduate Jamie Stringer is hired despite Ellenor's discomfort over Jamie's interview, in which the outgoing, friendly candidate accurately picked apart the flaws in the firm's defense of Lindsay. Jimmy is hired by a woman who told him she had kidnapped a girl 16 years ago and had raised as her daughter. This woman hired Jimmy to tell the person whose daughter she had kidnapped about the kidnapping, as well as the person accused of kidnapping that he knew she was innocent. Lindsay is allowed a visit with Bobby and their son before being moved to state prison.
126	2	"Convictions"	Christina M. Musrey	David E. Kelley	October 6, 2002	7ABQ02	13.55
Rebecca takes Lindsay's case to the state Supreme Court while Lindsay faces the prospect of not being allowed visits from her son for several months. Jimmy continues on the case of the kidnapping. An innocent woman is charged. Rebecca gets a new trial for Lindsay after the state Supreme Court rules Walsh violated her constitutional rights, infuriating Walsh who's also taken aback when Helen tells him directly she once admired him but now questions him. The woman who kidnapped the daughter is convinced by Jamie to come forward, which frees the actual suspect in the case and reunites the girl with her real mother.
127	3	"Of Thee I Sing"	Michael Zinberg	David E. Kelley	October 13, 2002	7ABQ03	13.58
Jamie is given her first solo case, a man accused of flashing teenage girls while urinating publicly---and gets a surprise mid-trial when he unexpectedly claims free speech while he's on the witness stand. The rest of the firm is working on prosecutorial misconduct for Lindsay. Jamie's client refuses a plea bargain and is convicted. Walsh's somewhat dissembling argument before the judge further exposes his prosecutorial misconduct, and the judge dismisses Lindsay's case with prejudice; she gets out of prison. Walsh shows further signs of cracking.
128	4	"The Cradle Will Rock"	Jeannot Szwarc	David E. Kelley	October 20, 2002	7ABQ04	13.95
Bobby and Eugene defend a family of Christian Scientists whose son died from a lack of medical care. Walsh loses control in front of a judge when going against Ellenor and Jamie in an unborn baby case. After a tenant next door to the firm decides to retire when he can no longer rent his single-room office, Lindsay decides to start her own practice in that office, with lower-key cases than criminal ones, dealing with stress from her imprisonment. After Ellenor and Helen talk to him separately, the embattled Walsh decides to take time off of undetermined length to sort out his mind and his life.
129	5	"Neighboring Species"	Dennis Smith	David E. Kelley	November 3, 2002	7ABQ05	13.26
Eugene, Ellenor, and Jamie defend the head of a stem-cell research firm whose location was zoned against by the city. Lindsay's first case on her own involves a friendly woman who is sued by her neighbour for singing loudly. Eugene gets into arguments with both Jimmy and Bobby over religion and Catholicism, based somewhat on the stem-cell research firm case. Lindsay's client is allowed to sing her favourite song during the lawsuit trial.
130	6	"The Telltale Nation"	Duane Clark	David E. Kelley	November 10, 2002	7ABQ06	12.45
Eugene and Ellenor sue for a man whose friend recommended he see a priest that had raped him, and eventually raped their client. The opposing attorney is Father Patrick. Eugene is upset with Bobby because Bobby is a Catholic, and Lindsay unnerves Bobby further when she tells him she refuses to allow their son to be christened in the Catholic Church. Lindsay and Jamie arbitrate a feud between former lovers. They are neighbors, and the woman screams loudly during sex, which he claims is a nuisance. The man is shot by the woman, who proves to be a lot more than just a victim acting in self defense. Bobby and Jimmy discuss the scandals of sexual abuse within the Catholic church. After talking to his longtime parish priest, Bobby tells him he's leaving the Catholic Church without renouncing his Catholic faith.
131	7	"Small Sacrifices"	Christina M. Musrey	David E. Kelley	November 17, 2002	7ABQ07	12.27
Bobby and Jimmy are assigned the case of a child molester and go against Helen. Features Anton Yelchin as the abused boy, Justin. Meanwhile, Ellenor defends an animal cruelty case where a man who practices Santaria slit the throat of a goat and the media got it on video. Bobby's priest recommends he quit being a defense attorney.
132	8	"Bad to Worse"	Jeannot Szwarc	David E. Kelley	December 1, 2002	7ABQ08	11.48
Ellenor and Eugene defend a fiery yet frightened client named Cassie Ray, a murder suspect with a shadowy past. Moreover, Cassie's alibi witness has significant skeletons in her own closet. In a separate case, Lindsay reluctantly defends an airline that refuses to carry passengers of Arab descent.
133	9	"The Good Fight"	Dwight Little	Jonathan Shapiro	December 8, 2002	7ABQ09	11.02
A cop-killing case rattles Bobby, whose anemic defense of an unsavory client leads Helen to suspect that he's "tanking the trial"; a drug bust raises search-and-seizure issues.
134	10	"Silent Partners"	Dennis Smith	Lukas Reiter	December 15, 2002	7ABQ10	10.90
Walsh returns to work but a brief confrontation with Bobby indicates the A.D.A. hasn't really learned as much from his break and his threapy as he wants people to think. Bobby has been benched due to his erratic behavior, so Eugene must take his place as lead counsel in a controversial murder case. Meanwhile Lindsay defends a killer, against her own better judgement, and Jamie is placed in a compromising situation involving a judge whom Ellenor and Jimmy suggested she flirt with during a suppression hearing---a suggestion that was a backfiring prank.
135	11	"Down the Hatch (Part 1)"	Christina M. Musrey	David E. Kelley	January 27, 2003	7ABQ11	8.96
Ellenor fights to save Denise Freeman, a rehabilitated death-row prisoner who has devoted her prison time to helping younger inmates---and whose own prison warden supports stopping her execution. In a last-ditch effort to stay her execution, Ellenor bases an appeal on the medication the court ordered Denise to take at trial, which prevented the jury from observing her schizophrenia. Eugene argues a civil suit that blames a beer company for the death of college-age Michael Berry. To be continued...
136	12	"Final Judgment (Part 2)"	Andy Wolk	David E. Kelley	February 3, 2003	7ABQ12	8.90
Ellenor's plan for Denise to show insanity by stopping her medication backfired, so Ellenor now races time to prevent Denise's execution. Eugene and Bobby, meanwhile, can't agree over the Berrys' refusal to accept a settlement in their suit against the brewer whose beers contributed to their son's death.
137	13	"Character Evidence"	Jeannot Szwarc	David E. Kelley	February 10, 2003	7ABQ13	7.66
Jimmy defends his high school crush, Brenda Miller, who is under investigation for a suspicious homicide in which the actual killer, Herrick Smoltz, may have set her up, and slightly nervous Claire Wyatt interviews for a job at Lindsay's newly formed law firm. Eugene helps an executive in a sexual harassment case with a bizarre twist: the executive shared gym workout classes with his young female employee and took one of her bras to wear himself hoping to rejuvenate his sex life with his wife. Jimmy's new relationship with Brenda is compromised when he maneuvers behind her back to get her cleared after Smoltz attempts to extort her. A still-skeptical Lindsay accepts when Claire offers to work three weeks without pay to prove her worth.
138	14	"The Making of a Trial Attorney"	Arvin Brown	David E. Kelley	March 3, 2003	7ABQ14	8.37
A wrongful-imprisonment suit occupies Bobby, whose client spent 15 years in jail for a killing he didn't commit; a case involving a youth's soccer injury tests Claire's mettle in court: she's suing a municipality for supporting soccer which she believes can be a dangerous sport.
139	15	"Choir Boys (Part 1)"	Duane Clark	David E. Kelley	March 10, 2003	7ABQ15	8.95
Helen faces up against the firm in a case involving Russell Bakey, accused of killing three women in supermarkets and whose overprotective mother Sylvia alibis for him. Concurrently, disturbed Stanley Deeks---whom Lindsay defended successfully in a murder trial while she knows he needs psychiatric treatment desperately---re-enters her life unexpectedly and disturbingly. Bakey may have sent Helen a not-so-veiled threat via computer even though he has no direct computer access. To be continued...
140	16	"Special Deliveries (Part 2)"	Rod Hardy	David E. Kelley	March 24, 2003	7ABQ16	10.71
Russell Bakey plagues Helen and Stanley Deeks continues plaguing Lindsay. Bakey's overprotective mother Sylvia now sues Helen for defamation over her trial cross examination, while Eugene and Jimmy can't convince Bakey to stop threatening Helen. Deeks ties Lindsay's hands on client privilege after admitting he's killed a young girl whose desperate parents want to find and bury her---which leads to her and Claire being jailed for contempt for refusing to violate attorney-client privilege and disclose the body's location. Deeks visits the dead girl's body where he killed her. After being freed, Lindsay admits to Bobby that one reason she began her own practise was to begin leaving him when she began to believe troubled workaholic Bobby was no longer in love with her. After sending the dead girl's body to Lindsay in a large parcel package, Deeks confronts Bakey at the latter's home.
141	17	"Burnout"	Christina M. Musrey	David E. Kelley	March 24, 2003	7ABQ17	9.67
The firm defends Kevin Healy (Christopher Reeve), a quadriplegic whose wife is charged with murdering his brother, the heir to a multimillion-dollar estate. Jimmy and Ellenor's defense is damaged by compelling circumstantial evidence, testimony about the defendant's stability — and the prosecution's playing of a shattering trump card. In other storylines, Jamie champions the cause of a lawyer who claims firms won't hire her because she's a rape victim; and Bobby, whose marriage is in trouble, unexpectedly meets an old flame (Teri Polo).
142	18	"Capitol Crimes"	Joseph Berger-Davis	David E. Kelley & Lukas Reiter	March 31, 2003	7ABQ18	8.62
Jimmy, Eugene, and Sarah---a former prosecutor---go to a death penalty hearing held by a committee of prosecutors who have decided to ask for the death penalty for one of the firm's clients, 19-year-old drug dealer Troy Ezekiel, who fired at a threatening rival but accidentally killed a 36-year-old mother of three. After Eugene, Jimmy, and Troy himself plead passionately, the committee recommends life in prison without parole to the client, but the Attorney General rejects their recommendation. Bobby has dinner with Sarah, and Sarah claims he is starting an affair. Bobby and Lindsay's marriage takes a turn for the worse when Lindsay tells him that she doesn't love him. Lindsay says that she still wants their marriage to work out. Bobby and Sarah have dinner again and, while awaiting Sarah's cab, Bobby kisses Sarah---unaware Lindsay is parked across the street with a full view.
143	19	"Les Is More"	Dennis Smith	David E. Kelley	April 7, 2003	7ABQ19	9.51
Fallout from when Lindsay saw Bobby kissing Sarah. Jimmy is held hostage with CBS President Les Moonves by a client, Grace Chapman, who wants to make the entire episode a reality television program involving a Russian Roulette variation. Sarah Barker and Lindsay talk a few times: about the kiss, chiefly discussing Bobby's inability to communicate, about Bobby's losing faith in being a criminal defense lawyer, and the marriage. Bobby and Lindsay talk about their marriage and say that they aren't leaving because of their child. Bobby self-analyzes painfully. Jimmy can't reveal to any outside contact that Grace is faking the entire explosives threat against Moonves. Lindsay leaves Bobby.
144	20	"Heroes and Villains"	Lisa Gay Hamilton	David E. Kelley	April 21, 2003	7ABQ20	7.59
A date-rape case is testy for the firm: Eugene is defending the suspect, but one of his former victims is Jamie, who's now a prosecution witness. Crazed Stanley Deeks re-enters Lindsay's life yet again, after we learn he may have murdered Russell Bakey, who's found dead in his bathtub. Seeming at first to have turned his life around, Deeks reveals he's become a high school teacher. Still terrified of him despite his pleas, Lindsay reveals his past to his new employers, costing him his job. Despite his warnings beforehand, Eugene can't bring himself to dismantle Jamie on cross-examination, forcing him to defend himself privately to Judge Kittleson. Still feeling threatened, Lindsay turns her files on Deeks over to Helen even though it may cost Lindsay her career. After Deeks accuses Lindsay of final betrayal following a court session to suppress Lindsay's files, Deeks's story ends tragically.
145	21	"Babylove (Part 1)"	Jeannot Szwarc	David E. Kelley, Bill Chais & Pamela Wisne	May 5, 2003	7ABQ21	10.07
After Lindsay arranged and attended the funeral of Stanley Deeks, the collapse of her marriage to Bobby preludes a professional crisis. Eugene and Jamie represent a pregnant woman who claims she killed her abusive husband in defense of their unborn child. Jimmy helps Claire in a case involving a ten-year-old girl in a liability suit after she fell from a balcony. Lindsay makes a final decision about her marriage. To be continued...
146	22	"Goodbye (Part 2)"	Michael Zinberg	David E. Kelley & Peter Blake	May 5, 2003	7ABQ22	10.07
Twists in the trial of accused wife-killer Tom Bartos rattle Jimmy and Rebecca---including that the victim's body was never found, that Bartos had an affair with his sister-in-law at the time of his brother's murder, that the sister-in-law was charged with murdering her abusive husband a decade earlier, and that Bartos may have helped fake the sister-in-law's own death. Bobby tells Eugene, Ellenor, Jimmy, Rebecca, and Lucy that he's decided to leave the firm and remake both his career and his life. The partners are devastated even though Bobby names Eugene the new managing partner. Lindsay angrily accuses Bobby of trying to avoid having to pay alimony in their pending divorce. Eugene and Jamie's dinner date is haunted by Eugene's feelings of loss with Bobby's resignation, but he reconciles with Bobby's decision and wishes his old friend well. Jimmy and Rebecca discover the truth about Bartos and his second wife before his trial goes to the jury. Lindsay apologises to Bobby and wishes him well.

=== Season 8 (2003–04) ===
No. overall	No. in season	Title	Directed by	Written by	Original release date	Prod. code	Viewers (millions)
147	1	"We the People"	Dennis Smith	David E. Kelley	September 28, 2003	8ABQ01	10.16
The divorcing Bobby and Lindsay, plus Rebecca and Lucy, have left the firm, leaving only Eugene, Ellenor, Jimmy, and Jamie. Helen Gamble has also left the district attorney's office. Ellenor defends Brad Stanfield, accused of killing his wife and unborn son, who insists his wife committed suicide. Eugene and Jimmy defend Aisha Crenshaw, a woman whose two-year-old daughter died in a drive-by shooting and who has now shot a known crack dealer on her street. Shifty Alan Shore comes to Ellenor looking for a job after he was fired for embezzlement, and he uses insurance fraud to coerce his accuser into dropping the charges. Jimmy has to find a way to close his defense of Aisha without incurring the judge's wrath after the judge refused to let Jimmy and Eugene defend her on self-defense or defense of persons grounds.
148	2	"The Chosen (Part 1)"	Leslie Libman	David E. Kelley	October 5, 2003	8ABQ02	9.94
Alan Shore agrees to help friend Sheila Carlisle (Sharon Stone), a successful attorney who claims God speaks to her, and who has subsequently been fired from her law firm for being mentally incompetent. The Brad Stanfield case turns a few twists that may put Ellenor and Jamie at professional risk---especially when Brad's ten-year-old daughter confesses to the crime. To be continued...
149	3	"Cause of Action (Part 2)"	Christina M. Musrey	David E. Kelley	October 12, 2003	8ABQ03	10.99
Eccentric attorney Sheila Carlisle, whom Alan Shore hired on a temporary basis without consulting anyone else, takes on a lawsuit on behalf of the firm---cuckolded husband Roland Huff is suing his wife, Nancy, over her six-year-old affair. Ellenor finally learns the terrible truth about Brad---he killed his pregnant wife and helped his young daughter fashion the ruse that got the charges dropped against him. Alan puts his own legal career at risk when he brings the district attorney's office the true facts about the Stanfield case in order to spare Ellenor the same risk. To be continued...
150	4	"Blessed Are They (Part 3)"	Simon Curtis	David E. Kelley	October 19, 2003	8ABQ04	10.63
Alan is troubled by Sheila's increasingly erratic behavior and fears for her mental—and legal—competence. Meanwhile, he has another dilemma: he's ordered by the court to represent a man who refuses to divulge his identity for fear that the unsavory nature of his crime will be made public. Concurrently, Brad has new representation, and his new lawyer tries to compel Ellenor to join him as he tries to suppress the file Alan exposed. Ellenor refuses. Sheila defends a taxidermist brought up on charges after he stuffed his mother's head.
151	5	"The Heat of Passion (Part 1)"	Nick Gomez	David E. Kelley & Lukas Reiter	October 26, 2003	8ABQ05	9.53
A complex murder case in which white supremacist Jonathan Macklin is accused of ordering a young follower to murder his former landlord embroils Eugene and Jimmy. Malpractice fears haunt Jamie, who lied to a client in a suit against an airline who refused to seat the client. The defense of accused killer Roland Huff embattles Alan, whose tactics astonish Tara and precipitate a run-in with a judge. Jamie's client receives an unexpected settlement. To be continued...
152	6	"The Lonely People (Part 2)"	Christina M. Musrey	David E. Kelley & Lukas Reiter	November 2, 2003	8ABQ06	9.03
Eugene and Jimmy's defense of Jonathan Macklin takes an unexpected turn when new developments come to light. Alan strikes up an unlikely relationship with Diane (Lisa Edelstein), whose brother's affair with Roland's wife ended so violently, but who reveals the abused childhood Roland suffered. Jamie and Eugene must come to terms with their differences.
153	7	"Rape Shield"	Jeannot Szwarc	David E. Kelley	November 9, 2003	8ABQ07	9.33
Jimmy isn't quite prepared to defend Derrick Mills (Laz Alonso) in a rape case in which the victim, Jessica Palmer (Elisabeth Moss), may well have arranged consensual sex to resemble rape and for her father to witness it. When Ellenor and Eugene learn the truth about Alan and Jamie's airline suit settlement, it provokes a showdown between Alan and Eugene. Jimmy isn't allowed to introduce evidence he discovers during the Mills trial that proves Jessica has a history of accusing rape falsely. Meanwhile, Alan unnerves Diane when he tells her he prefers to be the one saying goodbye if a relationship should die, and Jimmy faces the unlikely prospect of renewing his former intimate relationship with Judge Kittleson (Holland Taylor).
154	8	"Concealing Evidence"	Bill D'Elia	David E. Kelley & Lukas Reiter	November 23, 2003	8ABQ08	7.72
Alan's unethical tactics continue on two fronts: he tries to hide the murder weapon presented him by unstable suspect Ted Grayson, who'd barged into the firm's offices while police pursued him after a car chase; and, he hacks into a computer to get Karen Evanson a settlement against a drug manufacturer she claimed made a prescription medication that drove her husband to suicide.
155	9	"Victims' Rights"	Jeannot Szwarc	David E. Kelley & Peter Blake	November 30, 2003	8ABQ09	10.82
Alan Shore defends a twelve-year-old girl who is trying to escape an arranged marriage in her home country. Eugene tries to help a man who is seeking justice for the brutal murder of his wife. Alan leaves his usual rhetorical tricks aside to deliver an impassioned closing in which he almost persuades the judge that arranged marriage of a pre-teen girl is tantamount to sanctioning rape. The wife-killing suspect is acquitted but to Eugene's horror that's not the end of the story.
156	10	"Equal Justice"	Andy Wolk	David E. Kelley	December 7, 2003	8ABQ10	8.23
Alan uses unorthodox tactics when he's appointed by the court to defend a young drug addict accused of murder---which get him slapped by the young man's frightened mother. Meanwhile, Tara must try her first case when she's thrown into covering Alan's previously scheduled client.
157	11	"Police State"	Andy Wolk	David E. Kelley	January 11, 2004	8ABQ11	9.69
Flagrant police misconduct responding and acting when a patrol officer is shot in his vehicle infuriates the firm and especially Eugene. Police chased one of two young men who came out of the bar just before the shooting, shoot him, discover he's unarmed, then rush him to the hospital and torture him without allowing him to talk to any lawyer---not even Jamie, Ellenor, or Jimmy. The officer dies during surgery and his colleagues torture a statement out of the wounded suspect that fingers his friend---but the suspect was drugged during the statement, and it begins to appear the two young men only saw the shooting without seeing a shooter. Ellenor can't convince the FBI to step into the case. Alan awakens a judge in the dead of night but can't convince her to sign a habeas---with good if compromising reason. A.D.A. Walsh---already known for lack of ethics and disregard for certain rights when handling prosecutions---seems to abet or orchestrate a coverup of the police's actions in the case, driving the firm but Eugene especially to deliver justice.
158	12	"Avenging Angels"	Joseph Berger-Davis	David E. Kelley & Peter Blake	January 18, 2004	8ABQ12	8.54
Jimmy and Jamie defend elderly Walter Josephson (Ralph Waite), a retired dockworker accused of killing Charlie Haden, a local Irish mob member who killed Josephson's daughter. Alan agrees to help his friend Dwight Haber, a wealthy securities manager, by any means necessary in divorcing Haber's wife, who's cheating on him with an attorney general aspirant---including illegally bugging a hotel room.
159	13	"Going Home (Part 1)"	Michael Zinberg	David E. Kelley	February 15, 2004	8ABQ13	8.62
Alan's hometown of Dedham, Massachusetts is roiled when his best friend from childhood, popular dentist Paul Stewart (Patrick Dempsey), is accused of murdering his mistress. Alan agrees to defend Paul but has to tangle with Paul's wealthy and imperious mother, Victoria (Jill Clayburgh), and with Catherine Piper (Betty White), who saw Paul leave his mistress's apartment and extorts Victoria to buy her silence. Back in Boston, Eugene's outrage over Alan's bugging tactic in the Dwight Haber divorce case makes Eugene determined that Alan will be fired after he's finished with the Stewart case---and gets Jimmy to agree to do it without approaching Ellenor first because of her friendship with Alan. To be continued...
160	14	"Pre-Trial Blues (Part 2)"	Christina M. Musrey	David E. Kelley	February 22, 2004	8ABQ14	9.96
Usually overconfident Alan is anxious over jury selection in the Paul Stewart case in his hometown, not to mention an apparently hostile judge, a nervous priest's confession, malpractise suspicions involving manipulative Catherine Piper, and Paul's estranged wife, who wants to leave him for his adultery but reluctantly agrees to stand by him for the trial. In the middle of all this Alan and Paul repair to the treehouse they built as boys and reminisce while preparing.
161	15	"Mr. Shore Goes To Town (Part 3)"	Dennis Smith	David E. Kelley	March 7, 2004	8ABQ15	9.44
The trial is hammered by shocking testimony from Victoria Stewart, conflicted Fr. Tom Dugan, and crackpot Catherine Piper. Alan is forced to revert to his customary hardball patterns to defend both Paul Stewart, including exposing Fr. Dugan's secret and defending his own teenage affair with Victoria. Alan's closing invokes the fabled Sacco & Vanzetti case, which also occurred in Dedham, in a closing argument that seems to impress even the hostile judge to a point.
162	16	"In Good Conscience (Part 1)"	Kelli Williams	David E. Kelley	March 14, 2004	8ABQ16	9.08
Eugene continues preparing to fire Alan, including swearing Tara to secrecy. Ellenor and Jamie take the case of an impoverished young widower accusing a doctor of malpractise after his wife died giving birth to their daughter. The kicker involves Massachusetts' legal limits on damages applicable to charity hospital care. Eugene and Jimmy plan to fire Alan without telling Ellenor, who is Alan's longtime friend, and they arrange to have the firm's computer access changed quickly. But Tara betrays her knowledge of the plan to Alan. [The final seven episodes of The Practice, as a story arc, function as a backdoor pilot for the spinoff series Boston Legal.]
163	17	"War of the Roses (Part 2)"	Joseph Berger-Davis	David E. Kelley	March 21, 2004	8ABQ17	9.40
Eugene fires Alan, who swiftly sabotages the firm's computer system. Eugene then fires Tara over her betrayal. Lucy returns to the firm to pitch in for the now-absent Tara. Ellenor defends a woman who slapped a police officer after the officer tried to remove her physically from a protest against President George W. Bush's environmental policies. Ellenor also has an outraged showdown with Eugene over Alan's firing. Alan invokes the services of Denny Crane (William Shatner) from the high-profile law firm Crane, Poole and Schmidt to go head-to-head with Young, Frutt & Berluti in the face of his firing. First appearance of Denny Crane
164	18	"The Case Against Alan Shore (Part 3)"	Bill D'Elia	David E. Kelley	March 28, 2004	8ABQ18	9.83
Young, Frutt & Berlutti as a firm stand against Alan, Denny, and Crane, Poole & Schmidt. A major issue is whether Alan deserves the severance he proposes as opposed to the small severance Eugene offered. Ellenor is torn over the possibility of testifying against her friend, while the firm braces for the possibility of Alan and Denny going scorched earth. Ellenor tries to re-hire Tara to get her on the firm's side. Ellenor reluctantly testifies against Alan in the court action and holds up even under Alan's cross-examination. Eugene defends the firm's ethical stances passionately, and Alan is just as passionate in pointing out what he sees as the firm's hypocrisies in standing for ethics while tacitly accepting Alan's lack of them.
165	19	"The Firm"	Christina M. Musrey	David E. Kelley	April 18, 2004	8ABQ19	8.82
Friction at the firm gets to Jimmy, who's torn between loyalties and principles. Jimmy has to resolve an issue for an old friend, Manny Quinn (Billy Gardell), who says the FBI planted a bug in his buttocks after he was injured in a drug deal. At Crane, Poole & Schmidt, Alan and Tara settle in as new employees. Alan is tense while crossing swords with Denny, whose behavior during a wrongful death raises questions of competence. Tara clashes with Hannah Rose (Rebecca De Mornay), a tenacious junior partner, while handling a rape case. Young associate Sally Heep (Lake Bell) is also in Hannah's line of fire.
166	20	"Comings and Goings"	Jeannot Szwarc	David E. Kelley	April 25, 2004	8ABQ20	8.77
Eugene is presented with an offer he finds hard to refuse: a Superior Court judgeship. Ellenor is shocked when she hears the news, knowing full well that any departure by Eugene would mean the beginning of the end of the practice. Meanwhile, Jimmy has begun his own practice, but he almost promptly faces a threat from crooked Lenny Pascatore, who claims that the neighborhood in which Jimmy has set up shop only has room for one practicing attorney. At Crane, Poole & Schmidt, Hannah Rose enlists Alan's help in handling an assault case involving two hockey players---and his somewhat innovative solution to the league commissioner prompts Hannah to find herself attracted to Alan, while Sally is shaken when Alan and Hannah discover her dancing on top of a bar. Alan's consolation to Sally after Hannah's quiet but firm dressing-down leads Sally to misinterpret Alan's feelings.
167	21	"New Hoods on the Block"	Bill D'Elia	David E. Kelley & Frank Renzulli	May 2, 2004	8ABQ21	8.85
Eugene continues pondering the judgeship offer, still torn between the obvious respect the offer shows him and his feelings about the firm to which he's committed fifteen years of his life. Jimmy is shaken by an ominous run-in with Lenny Pescatore as their turf war heats up: one of Jimmy's new clients has been beaten up on Pescatore's apparent orders. Jimmy also has to help Manny resolve the setup issue after they wonder whether Manny's fiancee, Gigi Coley, and not an implanted chip, was the tipoff for Manny's drug bust. Ellenor clashes with sexy, ruthless Hannah in a product liability case. Alan finally admits he has real feelings for Tara. Eugene finally decides to accept the offered judgeship.
168	22	"Adjourned" "Cheers"	Jeannot Szwarc	David E. Kelley	May 16, 2004	8ABQ22	10.91
Young, Frutt & Berlutti officially closes. Eugene becomes a Superior Court judge---and recuses himself almost furiously when his first case includes Alan who tries to avoid the advances of Sally, another Crane, Poole & Schmidt associate, while working with the self-congratulatory Denny on a bizarre sexual harassment case and feeling somewhat torn about Tara. Jamie joins Jimmy in his new neighborhood law practice, as Jimmy solidifies office protocols, brings Lenny into the new firm hoping he'll leave his strong-arm style behind, and hires Manny as a paralegal. Alan surprises Eugene with a later chambers visit in which Alan tells Eugene his robe is just a garment but he has earned Alan's respect. Bobby Donnell surprises Ellenor with an office visit and learned Ellenor decides to take a career hiatus to raise her daughter. Eugene, Ellenor, Jimmy, and Jamie toast each other as the firm closes. The final shot is of playing Louis Armstrong's "Hello Brother" as the camera moves through the firm's offices which are packed up and all the lights are still on. Bobby, who doesn't like farewells and avoided the others' farewell gathering, sits alone at his desk on the brink of tears. Note: Alan, Tara, Sally, Denny, and some of the other attorneys of Crane, Poole & Schmidt appear next in the spin-off series Boston Legal. The alternate episode title, "Cheers", was used on the Bonus Disc of early copies of the Boston Legal Season 1 DVD box set.

== See also ==
- List of Ally McBeal episodes - includes crossover episode "The Inmates"
- List of Boston Public episodes - includes crossover episode "Chapter Thirteen"
- List of Gideon's Crossing episodes - includes crossover episode "Flashpoint"
