= Jill Goldsmith =

American TV writer and producer

Jill Goldsmith is an American writer and producer for television, with credits on Emmy-winning series including NYPD Blue, The Practice, Ally McBeal, Law & Order, and Boston Legal, and was a 2008 finalist for the Humanitas Prize. She has also been a featured speaker at numerous law schools, conferences, and writing programs, and has appeared as a panelist on C-Span Close Up, CBS News, and CNN. She earned her J.D. from the School of Law at Washington University in St. Louis, and served an internship with U.S. Senator Paul Simon on the Senate Judiciary Committee. She also earned an MFA in screenwriting from the School of Theater, Film and Television at University of California, Los Angeles. Prior to writing for television, Jill spent seven years as a Public Defender in the Juvenile and Felony Trial Divisions of the Cook County Public Defender's Office in Chicago, Illinois. She is also a contributing author to the book, Lawyers in Your Living Room! Law on Television, published in 2009, in which she wrote the chapter titled, Writing for Television: From Courtroom to Writer's Room.
