= The Practice =

American legal drama television series (1997–2004)

- Genre: Legal drama; Comedy drama
- Created by: David E. Kelley
- Starring: Dylan McDermott; LisaGay Hamilton; Steve Harris; Camryn Manheim; Kelli Williams; Michael Badalucco; Lara Flynn Boyle; Marla Sokoloff; Jason Kravits; Ron Livingston; Jessica Capshaw; Chyler Leigh; Rhona Mitra; James Spader
- Country of origin: United States
- Original language: English
- No. of seasons: 8
- No. of episodes: 167 (list of episodes)

Production
- Executive producers: David E. Kelley; Bill D'Elia
- Running time: 44 minutes
- Production companies: David E. Kelley Productions; 20th Century Fox Television

Original release
- Network: ABC
- Release: March 4, 1997 – May 16, 2004

Related
- Boston Legal

The Practice is an American legal comedy-drama television series created by David E. Kelley centering on partners and associates at a Boston law firm. The show ran for eight seasons on ABC, from March 4, 1997, to May 16, 2004. It won an Emmy in 1998 and 1999 for Outstanding Drama Series, and spawned the spin-off series Boston Legal, which ran for five more seasons (from 2004 to 2008).

Conflict between legal ethics and personal morality was a recurring theme with light comedy being occasionally present. Kelley claimed that the show was intended to be something of a rebuttal to L.A. Law and its romanticized treatment of the American legal system and legal proceedings.

== Overview ==
In season 1, Robert Donnell and Associates features Bobby Donnell as the sole partner in a firm that he started a decade prior with his receptionist Rebecca Washington. Ellenor Frutt, Eugene Young and Lindsay Dole are his associates. Jimmy Berluti is hired as an associate after losing his job in finance in an attempt to help Donnell and Associates with a loan.

In season 2, Eugene, Lindsay and Ellenor become partners after Lindsay insists on equity. Robert Donnell and Associates becomes Donnell, Young, Dole and Frutt. Rebecca also receives some equity in the firm even though she's not a lawyer. Helen Gamble, an assistant district attorney, becomes regularly entangled in the cases and personal lives of the employees of the firm. She is a personal friend of Lindsay and viewers learn several episodes into the season that Bobby and Helen have had an on-again/off-again secret affair. Her romantic relationship with Bobby ends after a high-profile murder case pits them against one another.

In season 3, Rebecca Washington, who had been attending law school in secret, becomes an associate after passing the bar exam. Lucy Hatcher is then hired as the new receptionist.

In season 4, Assistant District Attorney Richard Bay, like Helen, becomes a frequent ally and opponent of Donnell, Young, Dole and Frutt. At the end of the season, Bobby and Lindsay get married.

In season 5, Lucy becomes a rape crisis counselor in addition to her job as the firm's receptionist. Richard Bay is later assassinated after refusing to throw a murder trial. Bobby and Lindsay have a son together.

In season 6, Assistant District Attorney Alan Lowe becomes an antagonist of the firm for a short period of time.

In season 7, after she is convicted of murder and her conviction is overturned, Lindsay leaves Donnell, Young, Dole and Frutt to start a new law firm with Claire Wyatt. To fill the void left by Lindsay, Jamie Stringer is hired as an associate. Bobby leaves the firm in the season finale.

In season 8, Donnell, Young, Dole and Frutt has been renamed to Young, Frutt and Berluti. Eugene has taken Bobby's place as a senior partner. Lucy has left the firm to become a full-time rape crisis counselor. Rebecca has also left the firm for unknown reasons. Helen is no longer present at the firm's cases. Tara Wilson is hired as a paralegal, and Alan Shore becomes an associate.

After firing Alan and Tara – as well as being sued by the former – Young, Frutt and Berluti dissolve. Eugene then becomes a judge. Ellenor focuses her attention on motherhood. Jimmy and Jamie begin a new firm. Bobby mourns the loss of the law practice. Alan and Tara are hired by another firm, Crane, Poole and Schmidt, and their story is continued in Boston Legal.

== Main cast ==
| Name | Portrayed by | Occupation | Season | | | | | | | |
| Name | Portrayed by | Occupation | 1 | 2 | 3 | 4 | 5 | 6 | 7 | 8 |
|---|---|---|---|---|---|---|---|---|---|---|
| Bobby Donnell | Dylan McDermott | Lawyer | Main | | | | | | | Guest |
| Rebecca Washington | LisaGay Hamilton | Receptionist/Lawyer | Main | | | | | | | |
| Eugene Young | Steve Harris | Lawyer | Main | | | | | | | |
| Ellenor Frutt | Camryn Manheim | Lawyer | Main | | | | | | | |
| Lindsay Dole | Kelli Williams | Lawyer | Main | | | | | | | |
| Jimmy Berluti | Michael Badalucco | Lawyer | Main | | | | | | | |
| Helen Gamble | Lara Flynn Boyle | Assistant District Attorney | | Main | | | | | | |
| Lucy Hatcher | Marla Sokoloff | Receptionist | | | Main | | | | | Recurring |
| Richard Bay | Jason Kravits | Assistant District Attorney | | | | Recurring | Main | | | |
| Alan Lowe | Ron Livingston | Assistant District Attorney | | | | | | Main | | |
| Jamie Stringer | Jessica Capshaw | Lawyer | | | | | | | Main | |
| Claire Wyatt | Chyler Leigh | Lawyer | | | | | | | Main | |
| Alan Shore | James Spader | Lawyer | | | | | | | | Main |
| Tara Wilson | Rhona Mitra | Paralegal | | | | | | | | Main |

- Dylan McDermott as Bobby Donnell (seasons 1–7; guest season 8), the senior partner of the firm who struggles with his conscience and the idea of being a lawyer.
- LisaGay Hamilton as Rebecca Washington (seasons 1–7), the firm's first receptionist and paralegal. She later passed the bar exam and became an associate.
- Steve Harris as Eugene Young, the second highest-ranking partner at the firm and later senior partner who is more strongly devoted to the letter of the law and legal ethics than his colleagues. Later he even becomes a judge.
- Camryn Manheim as Ellenor Frutt, an associate and later senior partner at the firm who brought in various nefarious clients. A recurring gag on the show was that the men she dated often turned out to be murderers.
- Kelli Williams as Lindsay Dole (seasons 1–7), an associate at the firm and, later, wife of Bobby Donnell.
- Michael Badalucco as Jimmy Berluti, an associate and later partner at the firm from a working-class background. Jimmy often struggles with his conscience, loneliness, feelings of inadequacy, and a gambling addiction.
- Lara Flynn Boyle as Helen Gamble (seasons 2–7), an Assistant District Attorney and friend of the firm partners who was relentless in her attempts to prosecute those who do wrong.
- Marla Sokoloff as Lucy Hatcher (seasons 3–7; recurring season 8), the firm's wise-cracking, nosy receptionist who was hired after Rebecca became an attorney. She later became a part-time counselor for rape victims in addition to her job as a receptionist.
- Jason Kravits as Richard Bay (season 5; recurring season 4), a diminutive, hard-nosed Assistant District Attorney who believed in the guilt of all those he prosecuted.
- Ron Livingston as Alan Lowe (season 6), an Assistant District Attorney who replaced Richard Bay.
- Jessica Capshaw as Jamie Stringer (seasons 7–8), a high-strung, promiscuous Harvard Law School graduate and associate at the firm.
- Chyler Leigh as Claire Wyatt (season 7), Lindsay's associate at her new practice.
- Rhona Mitra as Tara Wilson (season 8), a paralegal and law student. She would later appear in Boston Legal as an attorney.
- James Spader as Alan Shore (season 8), an amoral associate and an old friend of Ellenor. He would later appear in Boston Legal.

== Recurring cast ==
- Ray Abruzzo as Detective Mike McGuire (45 episodes)
- Holland Taylor as Judge Roberta Kittleson (29 episodes)
- Linda Hunt as Judge Zoey Hiller (23 episodes)
- Bill Smitrovich as A.D.A. Kenneth Walsh (22 episodes)
- Richard McGonagle as Judge Patrick Wilcox (16 episodes)
- James Pickens, Jr. as Detective Mike McKrew (15 episodes)
- Frank Birney as Judge Warren West (14 episodes)
- Herb Mitchell as Judge Rodney White (12 episodes)
- Michael Monks as George Vogelman (11 episodes)
- Edward Herrmann as Anderson Pearson (10 episodes)
- Anna Gunn as A.D.A. Jean Ward (10 episodes)
- Kate Burton as A.D.A. Susan Alexander (9 episodes)
- Bruce Davison as Scott Wallace (9 episodes)
- Paul Dooley as Judge Philip Swackheim (8 episodes)
- Lynn Hamilton as Judge Fulton (7 episodes)
- Billee Thomas as Kendall Young (7 episodes)
- Susan Blommaert as Judge Rudy Fox (7 episodes)
- Steven Gilborn as A.D.A. Gavin Bullock (6 episodes)
- Vince Colosimo as Matthew Billings (6 episodes)
- Norman Lloyd as D.A. Asher Silverman (4 episodes)

== Notable guest stars ==
The series holds the Emmy Awards record for most wins in the Guest Actor and Actress categories for a single series, as well as most nominations in those categories. Emmys went to John Larroquette, Edward Herrmann, James Whitmore, Beah Richards, Michael Emerson, Charles S. Dutton, Alfre Woodard, Sharon Stone and William Shatner. In addition, Tony Danza, Paul Dooley, Henry Winkler, Marlee Matlin, René Auberjonois and Betty White were nominated but did not win. Larroquette, who won for his guest appearance during the second season, was nominated again for an episode from the sixth season, but did not win. The series won the Outstanding Guest Actor in a Drama Series for five consecutive years (from 1998 to 2002).

- Tony Amendola as Dr. Bernard Gorman
- Gabrielle Anwar as Katie Defoe
- Rosanna Arquette as Brenda Miller
- Ed Asner as Judge Matlin Pratt / Judge Marcus Winnaker
- René Auberjonois as Judge Mantz
- Dylan Baker as Keith Ellison
- Kathy Baker as Evelyn Mayfield
- Lake Bell as Sally Heep
- Gil Bellows as Billy Thomas
- Tempestt Bledsoe as Roberta Baylor
- Andre Braugher as Ben Gideon
- Christian Clemenson as Barry Wall
- Jon Cryer as Terry Pender
- Tony Danza as Tommy Silva
- Viola Davis as Aisha Crenshaw
- John de Lancie as Walter Bannish
- Rebecca De Mornay as Hannah Rose
- Patrick Dempsey as Paul Stewart
- Kevin Dunn as Bill Munce (Superman)
- Charles Durning as Stephen Donnell
- Charles S. Dutton as Leonard Marshall
- Aunjanue Ellis as Sharon Young
- Michael Emerson as William Hinks
- Giancarlo Esposito as Ray McMurphy
- Calista Flockhart as Ally McBeal
- Billy Gardell as Manny Quinn
- Gina Gershon as Glenn Hall
- Anthony Heald as Wallace Cooper/Scott Guber
- James Hong as Min Wong
- Doug Hutchison as Jackie Cahill
- John Larroquette as Joey Heric
- Andie MacDowell as Grace Chapman
- Virginia Madsen as Marsha Ellison
- Marlee Matlin as Sally Berg
- Chi McBride as Steven Harper
- Thomas McCarthy as Kevin Riley
- Paul McCrane as Martin Parks
- Gates McFadden as Judge Emily Harrison
- John C. McGinley as Leonard Good
- Leslie Moonves as Himself
- Chris O'Donnell as Brad Stanfield
- Vincent Pastore as Lenny Pescatore
- Robert Picardo as Dr. Edmunds
- Teri Polo as Sarah Barker
- CCH Pounder as Helene Washington
- Victoria Principal as Courtney Hansen (The Black Widow)
- Kim Raver as Victoria Keenan
- Christopher Reeve as Kevin Healy
- Beah Richards as Gertrude Turner
- Ernie Sabella as Harland Bassett
- William Shatner as Denny Crane
- Sharon Stone as Sheila Carlisle
- Rider Strong as Gary Armbrust
- Ralph Waite as Walter Josephson
- Donnie Wahlberg as Patrick Rooney
- Betty White as Catherine Piper
- James Whitmore as Raymond Oz
- Henry Winkler as Henry Olson
- Alfre Woodard as Denise Freeman
- D. B. Woodside as Aaron Wilton
- Armin Shimerman as Judge Garth Moskin

== Budget reduction and major revamp ==
By the end of the seventh season, faced with sagging ratings, ABC conditioned the show's renewal on a drastic budget reduction. As a result, Dylan McDermott, Kelli Williams, Lara Flynn Boyle, Chyler Leigh, Marla Sokoloff, and LisaGay Hamilton were fired as regulars. McDermott and Sokoloff reappeared as special guest stars and a recurring character respectively in the eighth season. The addition of James Spader and Rhona Mitra to the cast somewhat revived the ratings as Spader went on to win an Emmy for his appearance. However, ABC announced that The Practice would not return for a ninth season on March 11, 2004. Instead, Kelley would create a new spin-off series called Boston Legal which starred Spader, Mitra, Lake Bell, William Shatner and Candice Bergen.

== Episodes ==
The Practice had 8 seasons and a total of 168 episodes.

| Season | Episodes | Originally released | |
| Season | Episodes | First released | Last released |
|---|---|---|---|
| 1 | 6 | March 4, 1997 | April 8, 1997 |
| 2 | 28 | September 20, 1997 | May 11, 1998 |
| 3 | 23 | September 27, 1998 | May 9, 1999 |
| 4 | 22 | September 26, 1999 | May 21, 2000 |
| 5 | 22 | October 8, 2000 | May 13, 2001 |
| 6 | 23 | September 23, 2001 | May 19, 2002 |
| 7 | 22 | September 29, 2002 | May 5, 2003 |
| 8 | 22 | September 28, 2003 | May 16, 2004 |

=== Crossovers ===
- "Axe Murderer" (S02E26) – The lawyers of Robert Donnell and Associates work with the lawyers of Cage & Fish on a case in which a woman is accused of killing a wealthy client who may have been Lizzie Borden in a past life. The case had begun on Ally McBeal: "The Inmates" (S01E20).
- "The Day After" (S05E14) – Ellenor Frutt and Jimmy Berlutti are hired to represent Coach Riley, who's been fired from Winslow High for withholding information about Milton Buttle's affair. The hearing happens on Boston Public: "Chapter Thirteen" (S01E13).
- "Gideon's Crossover" (S05E16) – When Ellenor Frutt has trouble with her pregnancy, Dr. Ben Gideon helps out in Gideon's Crossing: "Flashpoint" (S01E17).

Additionally, Bobby Donnell (Dylan McDermott) appears in the Ally McBeal season 1 finale "These Are the Days", while Lara Flynn Boyle and Michael Badalucco each make cameos in "Making Spirits Bright" and "I Know Him by Heart".

Lara Flynn Boyle had an uncredited guest appearance as a rebuttal witness, opposite of guest star Heather Locklear's character in the season 5 episode "Tom Dooley".

== Home media ==
The Practice, Volume 1, was released as a four-disc DVD set in North America on June 12, 2007. The set includes all six episodes of season 1 and the first seven episodes of season 2. It also includes a featurette, "Setting Up The Practice". The set was also released in Region 4 on June 6, 2007 and in Region 2 on June 29, 2008.

On January 3, 2014, it was announced that Shout! Factory had acquired the rights to the series in Region 1 and would release the final season on DVD on April 15, 2014.

In 2012, Medium Rare Entertainment acquired the rights to the series in Region 2 and released the first and second seasons on DVD in the United Kingdom on February 27, 2012.

In 2014, StudioCanal released the first and second seasons over three volumes in Germany with German and English audio. The third, fourth, and eighth seasons have also been released in 2016 with plans to release the fifth and sixth at a later date.

Volume 1 was released in Italy and Greece on July 1, 2007.

In March 2019, all seasons and episodes of The Practice were released on the streaming service Amazon Prime Video. By 2021, seasons 1–8 became available on the streaming service Hulu.

| DVD name | Ep# | Region 1 | Region 2 | Region 4 |
|---|---|---|---|---|
| The Practice: Volume 1 | 13 | June 12, 2007 | June 29, 2008 | June 6, 2007 |
| The Practice: The Complete First and Second Seasons | 34 | —N/a | February 27, 2012 | —N/a |
| The Practice: The Complete Third Season | 23 | —N/a | January 21, 2016 (Germany) | —N/a |
| The Practice: The Complete Fourth Season | 22 | —N/a | January 21, 2016 (Germany) | —N/a |
| The Practice: The Final Season | 22 | April 15, 2014 | April 7, 2016 (Germany) | —N/a |

== U.S. television viewership ==
Viewer numbers per season of The Practice on ABC.

Note: Each US network television season starts in late September and ends in late May, which coincides with the completion of May sweeps. The first two seasons include the household rating. Seasons 4 and 5 reached the top 10 rankings.

| Season | Timeslot (Eastern & Pacific Time) | Season Premiere | Season Finale | TV Season | Viewers (in millions) | Viewer Rank |
|---|---|---|---|---|---|---|
| 1 | Tuesday 10:00PM | March 4, 1997 | April 8, 1997 | 1996–1997 | 9.1 | 45 |
| 2 | Saturday 10:00PM (September 20, 1997, to January 3, 1998) Monday 10:00PM (from January 5, 1998) | September 20, 1997 | May 11, 1998 | 1997–1998 | 10.0 | 82 |
| 3 | Sunday 10:00PM | September 27, 1998 | May 9, 1999 | 1998–1999 | 12.7 | 34 |
| 4 | Sunday 10:00PM | September 26, 1999 | May 21, 2000 | 1999–2000 | 19.3 | 9 |
| 5 | Sunday 10:00PM | October 8, 2000 | May 13, 2001 | 2000–2001 | 18.3 | 9 |
| 6 | Sunday 10:00PM | September 23, 2001 | May 19, 2002 | 2001–2002 | 12.9 | 26 |
| 7 | Sunday 10:00PM (September 29, 2002, to December 15, 2002) Monday 9:00PM (from January 27, 2003) | September 29, 2002 | May 5, 2003 | 2002–2003 | 9.8 | 55 |
| 8 | Sunday 10:00PM | September 28, 2003 | May 16, 2004 | 2003–2004 | 9.1 | 63 |

The exposure from its January 30, 2000, post-Super Bowl episode (attracting 23.8 million viewers) plus their weekly lead-in from early 2000 to mid-2001, the then mega-hit Who Wants to Be a Millionaire, helped the series reach its ratings peak.

- Series High: 15.4 rating/23.8 million viewers
  - lead in: Super Bowl: Post Game — 25.6 rating
- Series Low: 4.9 rating/7.3 million
- Series Debut: 11.3 rating/16.1 million viewers
- Series Finale: 7.5 rating/10.9 million viewers

== Awards and nominations ==
| Year | Award | Category | Recipient | Result |
|---|---|---|---|---|
| 2001 | American Society of Cinematographers Award | Outstanding Achievement in Cinematography in Regular Series | Dennis Smith (For episode "The Deal") | Nominated |
| 2001 | ASCAP Film and Television Music Awards | Top TV Series | Marco Beltrami and Jon Hassell | Won |
| 2002 | ASCAP Film and Television Music Awards | Top TV Series | Marco Beltrami and Jon Hassell | Won |
| 2003 | ASCAP Film and Television Music Awards | Top TV Series | Marco Beltrami and Jon Hassell | Won |
| 2000 | BMI Film & TV Awards | BMI TV Music Award | Peter Scaturro | Won |
| 2001 | BMI Film & TV Awards | BMI TV Music Award | Tom Hiel and Peter Scaturro | Won |
| 2002 | BMI Film & TV Awards | BMI TV Music Award | Tom Hiel and Peter Scaturro | Won |
| 2001 | Casting Society of America's Artios Award | Best Casting for TV, Dramatic Episodic | Janet Gilmore and Megan McConnell | Nominated |
| 1998 | Edgar Allan Poe Award | Best Episode in a TV Series | Michael R. Perry, Stephen Gaghan and David E. Kelley (For episode "First Degree") | Nominated |
| 2002 | Edgar Allan Poe Award | Best Episode in a TV Series | Jonathan Shapiro, Lukas Reiter, Peter Blake and David E. Kelley (For episode "Killing Time") | Nominated |
| 2004 | Edgar Allan Poe Award | Best Episode in a TV Series | Peter Blake and David E. Kelley (For episode "Goodbye") | Won |
| 1999 | Genesis Award | Television - Dramatic Series | "The Food Chain" | Won |
| 2003 | Genesis Award | Television - Dramatic Series | "Small Sacrifices" | Won |
| 1998 | GLAAD Media Award | Outstanding TV - Individual Episode | "Civil Rights" | Nominated |
| 1999 | Golden Globe Award | Best Television Series – Drama | | Won |
| 1999 | Golden Globe Award | Best Actor – Television Series Drama | Dylan McDermott | Won |
| 1999 | Golden Globe Award | Best Supporting Actress – Series, Miniseries or Television Film | Camryn Manheim | Won |
| 2000 | Golden Globe Award | Best Television Series – Drama | | Nominated |
| 2000 | Golden Globe Award | Best Actor – Television Series Drama | Dylan McDermott | Nominated |
| 2001 | Golden Globe Award | Best Television Series – Drama | | Nominated |
| 2001 | Golden Globe Award | Best Actor – Television Series Drama | Dylan McDermott | Nominated |
| 2002 | Humanitas Prize | 60 Minute Category | Lukas Reiter and David E. Kelley (For episode "Honor Code") | Won |
| 2003 | Humanitas Prize | 60 Minute Category | David E. Kelley (For episode "Final Judgment") | Won |
| 1998 | Motion Picture Sound Editors' Golden Reel Award | Best Sound Editing - Television Episodic - Dialogue & ADR | | Nominated |
| 2000 | Motion Picture Sound Editors' Golden Reel Award | Best Sound Editing - Television Episodic - Dialogue & ADR | T.W. Davis, Donna Beltz, Ken Gladden, H. Jay Levine and Debby Ruby-Winsberg | Nominated |
| 1999 | NAACP Image Award | Outstanding Actor in a Drama Series | Steve Harris | Nominated |
| 2000 | NAACP Image Award | Outstanding Drama Series | | Nominated |
| 2000 | NAACP Image Award | Outstanding Actor in a Drama Series | Steve Harris | Nominated |
| 2000 | NAACP Image Award | Outstanding Supporting Actress in a Drama Series | LisaGay Hamilton | Nominated |
| 2001 | NAACP Image Award | Outstanding Drama Series | | Nominated |
| 2001 | NAACP Image Award | Outstanding Actor in a Drama Series | Steve Harris | Nominated |
| 2001 | NAACP Image Award | Outstanding Supporting Actress in a Drama Series | Beah Richards | Nominated |
| 2002 | NAACP Image Award | Outstanding Drama Series | | Nominated |
| 2002 | NAACP Image Award | Outstanding Actor in a Drama Series | Steve Harris | Nominated |
| 2004 | NAACP Image Award | Outstanding Actor in a Drama Series | Steve Harris | Won |
| 2005 | NAACP Image Award | Outstanding Actor in a Drama Series | Steve Harris | Nominated |
| 1999 | Peabody Award | | ABC and David E. Kelley Productions | Won |
| 1999 | PGA Award | Outstanding Producer of Episodic Television | David E. Kelley, Robert Breech, Jeffrey Kramer, Christina Musrey, Gary M. Strangis and Pamela J. Wisne | Won |
| 2001 | PGA Award | Outstanding Producer of Episodic Television, Drama | | Nominated |
| 1998 | Primetime Emmy Award | Outstanding Drama Series | David E. Kelley, Jeffrey Kramer, Robert Breech, Ed Redlich, Gary M. Strangis, Alice West, Jonathan Pontell, Christina Musrey and Pamela J. Wisne | Won |
| 1998 | Primetime Emmy Award | Outstanding Supporting Actress in a Drama Series | Camryn Manheim | Won |
| 1998 | Primetime Emmy Award | Outstanding Writing for a Drama Series | David E. Kelley (For episode "Betrayal") | Nominated |
| 1998 | Primetime Emmy Award | Outstanding Guest Actor in a Drama Series | John Larroquette | Won |
| 1999 | Primetime Emmy Award | Outstanding Drama Series | David E. Kelley, Jeffrey Kramer, Robert Breech, Gary M. Strangis, Christina Musrey and Pamela J. Wisne | Won |
| 1999 | Primetime Emmy Award | Outstanding Lead Actor in a Drama Series | Dylan McDermott | Nominated |
| 1999 | Primetime Emmy Award | Outstanding Supporting Actor in a Drama Series | Michael Badalucco | Won |
| 1999 | Primetime Emmy Award | Outstanding Supporting Actor in a Drama Series | Steve Harris | Nominated |
| 1999 | Primetime Emmy Award | Outstanding Supporting Actress in a Drama Series | Lara Flynn Boyle | Nominated |
| 1999 | Primetime Emmy Award | Outstanding Supporting Actress in a Drama Series | Camryn Manheim | Nominated |
| 1999 | Primetime Emmy Award | Outstanding Supporting Actress in a Drama Series | Holland Taylor | Won |
| 1999 | Primetime Emmy Award | Outstanding Guest Actor in a Drama Series | Tony Danza | Nominated |
| 1999 | Primetime Emmy Award | Outstanding Guest Actor in a Drama Series | Edward Herrmann | Won |
| 1999 | Primetime Emmy Award | Outstanding Casting for a Series | Janet Gilmore and Megan McConnell | Nominated |
| 1999 | Primetime Emmy Award | Outstanding Cinematography for a Series | Dennis Smith (For episode "Happily Ever After") | Nominated |
| 1999 | Primetime Emmy Award | Outstanding Costuming for a Series | Shelly Levine and Loree Parral (For episode "Of Human Bondage") | Nominated |
| 1999 | Primetime Emmy Award | Outstanding Sound Mixing for a Drama Series | Clark King, Harry Andronis, David John West and Kurt Kassulke (For episode "Happily Ever After") | Nominated |
| 2000 | Primetime Emmy Award | Outstanding Drama Series | David E. Kelley, Jeffrey Kramer, Robert Breech, Gary M. Strangis, Christina Musrey and Pamela J. Wisne | Nominated |
| 2000 | Primetime Emmy Award | Outstanding Supporting Actor in a Drama Series | Michael Badalucco | Nominated |
| 2000 | Primetime Emmy Award | Outstanding Supporting Actor in a Drama Series | Steve Harris | Nominated |
| 2000 | Primetime Emmy Award | Outstanding Supporting Actress in a Drama Series | Holland Taylor | Nominated |
| 2000 | Primetime Emmy Award | Outstanding Guest Actor in a Drama Series | Paul Dooley | Nominated |
| 2000 | Primetime Emmy Award | Outstanding Guest Actor in a Drama Series | James Whitmore | Won |
| 2000 | Primetime Emmy Award | Outstanding Guest Actor in a Drama Series | Henry Winkler | Nominated |
| 2000 | Primetime Emmy Award | Outstanding Guest Actress in a Drama Series | Marlee Matlin | Nominated |
| 2000 | Primetime Emmy Award | Outstanding Guest Actress in a Drama Series | Beah Richards | Won |
| 2000 | Primetime Emmy Award | Outstanding Casting for a Drama Series | Janet Gilmore and Megan McConnell | Nominated |
| 2001 | Primetime Emmy Award | Outstanding Drama Series | David E. Kelley, Robert Breech, Christina Musrey, Gary M. Strangis, Pamela J. Wisne, Joseph Berger-Davis and Todd Ellis Kessler | Nominated |
| 2001 | Primetime Emmy Award | Outstanding Guest Actor in a Drama Series | René Auberjonois | Nominated |
| 2001 | Primetime Emmy Award | Outstanding Guest Actor in a Drama Series | Michael Emerson | Won |
| 2001 | Primetime Emmy Award | Outstanding Casting for a Drama Series | Janet Gilmore and Megan McConnell | Nominated |
| 2001 | Primetime Emmy Award | Outstanding Cinematography for a Single-Camera Series | Dennis Smith (For episode "The Deal") | Nominated |
| 2001 | Primetime Emmy Award | Outstanding Single Camera Picture Editing for a Series | Susanne Malles (For episode "The Day After") | Nominated |
| 2001 | Primetime Emmy Award | Outstanding Single Camera Sound Mixing for a Series | Clark King, David John West, Eric Clopein and David Dondorf (For episode "The Day After") | Nominated |
| 2002 | Primetime Emmy Award | Outstanding Guest Actor in a Drama Series | Charles S. Dutton | Won |
| 2002 | Primetime Emmy Award | Outstanding Guest Actor in a Drama Series | John Larroquette | Nominated |
| 2003 | Primetime Emmy Award | Outstanding Guest Actress in a Drama Series | Alfre Woodard | Won |
| 2004 | Primetime Emmy Award | Outstanding Lead Actor in a Drama Series | James Spader | Won |
| 2004 | Primetime Emmy Award | Outstanding Guest Actor in a Drama Series | William Shatner | Won |
| 2004 | Primetime Emmy Award | Outstanding Guest Actress in a Drama Series | Sharon Stone | Won |
| 2004 | Primetime Emmy Award | Outstanding Guest Actress in a Drama Series | Betty White | Nominated |
| 2004 | Prism Award | Performance in a Drama Series Episode | Steve Harris | Nominated |
| 1999 | Satellite Award | Best Actor – Television Series Drama | Dylan McDermott | Nominated |
| 2000 | Satellite Award | Best Television Series – Drama | | Nominated |
| 2000 | Satellite Award | Best Actor – Television Series Drama | Dylan McDermott | Nominated |
| 2000 | Satellite Award | Best Actress – Television Series Drama | Camryn Manheim | Won |
| 2000 | Satellite Award | Best Actress – Television Series Drama | Kelli Williams | Nominated |
| 2001 | Satellite Award | Best Television Series – Drama | | Nominated |
| 1999 | Screen Actors Guild Award | Outstanding Performance by an Ensemble in a Drama Series | | Nominated |
| 2000 | Screen Actors Guild Award | Outstanding Performance by an Ensemble in a Drama Series | | Nominated |
| 2001 | Screen Actors Guild Award | Outstanding Performance by an Ensemble in a Drama Series | | Nominated |
| 1998 | Television Critics Association Award | Outstanding Achievement in Drama | | Nominated |
| 1999 | Television Critics Association Award | Program of the Year | | Nominated |
| 1999 | Television Critics Association Award | Outstanding Achievement in Drama | | Nominated |
| 1999 | Television Critics Association Award | Individual Achievement in Drama | David E. Kelley | Won |
| 1999 | Television Critics Association Award | Individual Achievement in Drama | Camryn Manheim | Nominated |
| 1999 | Television Critics Association Award | Individual Achievement in Drama | Dylan McDermott | Nominated |
| 2000 | Television Critics Association Award | Outstanding Achievement in Drama | | Nominated |
| 2000 | TV Guide Award | Favorite Drama Series | | Nominated |
| 1998 | Viewers for Quality Television Award | Best Quality Drama Series | | Won |
| 1998 | Viewers for Quality Television Award | Best Actor in a Quality Drama Series | Dylan McDermott | Nominated |
| 1998 | Viewers for Quality Television Award | Best Supporting Actor in a Quality Drama Series | Michael Badalucco | Nominated |
| 1998 | Viewers for Quality Television Award | Best Supporting Actor in a Quality Drama Series | Steve Harris | Won |
| 1998 | Viewers for Quality Television Award | Best Supporting Actress in a Quality Drama Series | Camryn Manheim | Nominated |
| 1998 | Viewers for Quality Television Award | Best Supporting Actress in a Quality Drama Series | Kelli Williams | Nominated |
| 1998 | Viewers for Quality Television Award | Best Recurring Player | Linda Hunt | Nominated |
| 1998 | Viewers for Quality Television Award | Best Recurring Player | John Larroquette | Won |
| 1999 | Viewers for Quality Television Award | Best Quality Drama Series | | Won |
| 1999 | Viewers for Quality Television Award | Best Actor in a Quality Drama Series | Dylan McDermott | Nominated |
| 1999 | Viewers for Quality Television Award | Best Supporting Actor in a Quality Drama Series | Michael Badalucco | Nominated |
| 1999 | Viewers for Quality Television Award | Best Supporting Actor in a Quality Drama Series | Steve Harris | Won |
| 1999 | Viewers for Quality Television Award | Best Supporting Actress in a Quality Drama Series | Camryn Manheim | Won |
| 1999 | Viewers for Quality Television Award | Best Supporting Actress in a Quality Drama Series | Kelli Williams | Nominated |
| 2000 | Viewers for Quality Television Award | Best Quality Drama Series | | Nominated |
| 2000 | Viewers for Quality Television Award | Best Actor in a Quality Drama Series | Dylan McDermott | Nominated |
| 2000 | Viewers for Quality Television Award | Best Supporting Actor in a Quality Drama Series | Michael Badalucco | Nominated |
| 2000 | Viewers for Quality Television Award | Best Supporting Actor in a Quality Drama Series | Steve Harris | Nominated |
| 2000 | Viewers for Quality Television Award | Best Supporting Actress in a Quality Drama Series | Camryn Manheim | Nominated |
| 1999 | Writers Guild of America Award | Episodic Drama | David E. Kelley (For episode "Betrayal") | Nominated |
| 1999 | Young Artist Award | Best Performance in a TV Drama Series - Guest Starring Young Actor | Billie Thomas | Nominated |
| 2002 | Young Artist Award | Best Performance in a TV Drama Series - Guest Starring Young Actor | Marc John Jefferies | Nominated |
| 2002 | Young Artist Award | Best Performance in a TV Drama Series - Guest Starring Young Actress | Jamie Lauren | Nominated |
| 2003 | Young Artist Award | Best Performance in a TV Drama Series - Guest Starring Young Actress | Jamie Lauren | Nominated |
