= Harry's Law season 1 =

Harry's Law
- Season 1
- No. of episodes: 12

Release
- Original network: NBC
- Original release: January 17 – April 4, 2011

Season chronology
- ← Previous — Next → Season 2

The first season of Harry's Law, a legal dramedy created by David E. Kelley, premiered on January 17, 2011, and concluded on April 4, 2011. The season consisted of twelve hour-long episodes that aired Monday nights at 10pm on NBC. The series stars Kathy Bates as Harriett Korn, a patent lawyer who is fired from her firm when she is caught smoking cannabis in her office. She subsequently starts her own small firm in a storefront that used to be a shoe store where she defends clients charged with serious crimes.

Despite mixed reaction from critics, the series became NBC's highest rated scripted drama and was renewed for a second season, which premiered Wednesday, September 21.

== Cast ==
=== Main cast ===
- Kathy Bates as Harriett "Harry" Korn
- Aml Ameen as Malcolm Davies
- Brittany Snow as Jenna Backstrom
- Nate Corddry as Adam Branch

=== Recurring cast ===
- Christopher McDonald as Thomas "Tommy" Jefferson
- Johnny Ray Gill as Damien Winslow
- Jordana Spiro as Rachael Miller
- Paul McCrane as Josh "Puck" Peyton
- Irene Keng as Chunhua Lao
- Rashad Hood as Lewis Epps
- Camryn Manheim as Kim Mendelsohn

== Episodes ==
No. overall	No. in season	Title	Directed by	Written by	Original release date	Prod. code	US viewers (millions)
1	1	"Pilot"	Bill D'Elia	David E. Kelley	January 17, 2011	2J5901	11.07
Disillusioned patent attorney Harriet "Harry" Korn (Kathy Bates) is fired from her cushy law firm job, and after some random incidents becomes a defense attorney for Malcolm Davies (Aml Ameen), a kid with a third drug charge, who lands on her after trying to commit suicide. Harry opens her own law firm in a former shoe store, bringing in her aide from the old firm, Jenna Backstrom (Brittany Snow), who turns the left-behind shoe stock into a side business. Adam Branch (Nate Corddry), an up-and-coming trial lawyer, joins Harry's firm after running her over with his car, and defends a street kid—Damien Winslow, who protects the neighborhood—who shot a man trying to rob a drycleaner.
2	2	"Heat of Passion"	Bill D'Elia	David E. Kelley	January 24, 2011	2J5902	10.43
A former employee sues Mr. Tao—Harry's drycleaner owner/neighbor—who fired her for becoming pregnant with a second child; the case is then moved to Ohio Supreme Court, much to Adam's glee. An elderly woman, with little to no money, asks for Harry's help after she robs a liquor store to support herself. Adam's ex-girlfriend Rachael arrives to convince him to leave Harry's firm and get his old job back, but to no avail.
3	3	"Innocent Man"	Stephen Cragg	David E. Kelley	January 31, 2011	2J5906	11.02
Harry defends a man about to go on parole. Tao's laundry is attacked after news of the trial's details (the laundromat's One-Child Policy) gets out. A woman comes to Harry for help after receiving a heart attack from addictive fast-food; Harry rejects the case, which Tommy and Malcolm take instead.
4	4	"Wheels of Justice"	Jeff Bleckner	David E. Kelley	February 7, 2011	2J5907	9.22
Chunhua gets sexually assaulted in an alleyway. Damien seeks revenge on Chunhua's attacker. Meanwhile, Tommy and Malcolm continue on their fast-food case.
5	5	"A Day in the Life"	Jonathan Pontell	David E. Kelley & Christopher Ambrose	February 14, 2011	2J5908	8.51
Harry faces disbarment when she proclaims her client's guilt to a jury and is then held in contempt. Meanwhile, in order to get his criminal record expunged, Malcolm goes undercover as a drug dealer.
6	6	"Bangers in the House"	Mike Listo	David E. Kelley & Lawrence Broch	February 21, 2011	2J5903	8.75
Harry and Malcolm mediate between two warring street gangs. Also, Lewis, a member of one of the gangs who wants out so he can live a better life, seeks Harry's help. Adam and Rachael argue a case against Tommy over an elderly man who was fired from his job because of his age.
7	7	"American Dreams"	Steve Robin	Lawrence Broch & David E. Kelley	February 28, 2011	2J5905	9.20
Harry and Tommy work together to help a group of albino illegal immigrants facing deportation to Tanzania, where albinos are at times hunted. Meanwhile, Jenna fights to have her stolen car returned. Malcolm goes on a date.
8	8	"In the Ghetto"	Arlene Sanford	David E. Kelley & Susan Dickes	March 7, 2011	2J5909	9.59
Lewis is shot in a drive by shooting but is helped by a 16-year-old kid named Willie who works as the neighborhood doctor. Although he survives, he is need of a liver transplant and Harry races to get him the surgery he needs. The ADA suspects Willie of being involved in the murder of a cop. Also Jenna and Malcolm grow closer.
9	9	"The Fragile Beast"	Tom Verica	David E. Kelley & Susan Dickes	March 14, 2011	2J5910	10.16
Harry is approached by the lover of a woman who has been locked in the basement of her house by her husband, so he could keep her from cheating on him. Meanwhile, Adam gets to try his hand at working divorce cases, when he takes on his first one. Malcolm and Jenna try to talk about their kiss.
10	10	"Send in the Clowns"	Michael Pressman	David E. Kelley	March 21, 2011	2J5904	8.43
Harry helps her ex-boyfriend in an armed robbery case, but she has difficulty mounting a defense when she doubts the person's innocence. Meanwhile, Adam defends a transsexual who was fired from her job when her affair with her boss was revealed to his wife. Malcolm is angry at Jenna after she downplays their relationship.
11	11	"With Friends Like These"	Bill D'Elia	David E. Kelley	March 28, 2011	2J5911	8.54
Harry defends an old colleague after a stand-off goes awry. Meanwhile, Adam professes his love for Rachael and tries to break up with Chunhua, and Jenna and Malcolm try to talk about their relationship.
12	12	"Last Dance"	Mike Listo	David E. Kelley & Christopher Ambrose	April 4, 2011	2J5912	7.75
Harry assists Josh "Puck" Peyton after he suffers another nervous breakdown. Meanwhile, Adam and Rachael defend a death-row inmate. Jenna and Malcolm have an argument when Malcolm won't show any affection for her in public, especially in front of Harry. Josh (Paul McCrane) sings "Is It Okay If I Call You Mine?", the same song McCrane wrote and performed in Fame.

== Reception ==
Season 1 earned a 48 out of 100 of Metacritic, a site that assigns scores to shows based on reviews. Most reviews of the pilot were mixed. In a positive one Rob Owen said it had crisp politically tinged dialogue. The pilot was seen by 11.07 million viewers in the US. The show retained most of those viewers throughout its run, making it NBC's highest rated drama.
