= Harry's Law season 2 =

Harry's Law
- Season 2
- Promotional image
- No. of episodes: 22

Release
- Original network: NBC
- Original release: September 21, 2011 – May 27, 2012

Season chronology
- ← Previous; Season 1

The second and final season of Harry's Law, a legal dramedy created by David E. Kelley, premiered on NBC on September 21, 2011. Regular cast members during the season include Kathy Bates, Nathan Corddry, Karen Olivo, Mark Valley, and Christopher McDonald. Christopher McDonald was promoted to a main character after season one. Aml Ameen and Brittany Snow left the cast after season one but returned as guest stars in season two. The season was originally going to have thirteen episodes. On October 11, 2011, NBC ordered an additional six scripts, bringing the total to 19.

On November 12, 2011, NBC revealed that Harry's Law will move to Sunday at mid-season. On January 6, 2012, NBC announced a full season order of 22 episodes.

NBC announced that the second season would be the last, effectively canceling the series on May 11, 2012.

== Cast ==
=== Main cast ===
- Kathy Bates as Harriett "Harry" Korn
- Nathan Corddry as Adam Branch
- Karen Olivo as Cassie Reynolds
- Justine Lupe as Phoebe Blake (episodes 15–22)
- Mark Valley as Oliver "Olli" Richard
- Christopher McDonald as Thomas "Tommy" Jefferson

=== Recurring cast ===
- Brittany Snow as Jenna Backstrom
- Aml Ameen as Malcolm Davies
- Jean Smart as Roseanna Remmick
- Alfred Molina as Eric Sanders
- Camryn Manheim as Kim Mendelsohn
- Paul McCrane as Josh "Puck" Peyton
- Irene Keng as Chunhua Lao
- Christian Clemenson as Sam Berman

== Episodes ==
| No. overall | No. in season | Title | Directed by | Written by | Original release date | Prod. code | US viewers (millions) |
|---|---|---|---|---|---|---|---|
| 13 | 1 | "Hosanna Roseanna" | Bill D'Elia | David E. Kelley | September 21, 2011 | 2J6101 | 7.53 |
Harry, Adam, and Oliver prepare for the high-profile trial of a man (Alfred Molina) everyone believes is guilty, while simultaneously fending off a devious district attorney (Jean Smart). Meanwhile, Cassie represents an artist who wants to reclaim a painting.
| 14 | 2 | "There Will Be Blood" | Bill D'Elia | David E. Kelley | September 28, 2011 | 2J6102 | 7.63 |
Harry continues to prepare for the Sanders trial. Adam attempts to win over the children of the defendant (Alfred Molina), while Oliver tries to obtain information from a potential witness. Meanwhile, Tommy tries to convince Harry to play dirty against Roseanna (Jean Smart).
| 15 | 3 | "Sins of the Father" | Mike Listo | David E. Kelley | October 5, 2011 | 2J6103 | 8.45 |
The Sanders trial begins, and Harry must fight for her client (Alfred Molina). While the team tries desperately to find another potential murderer, Roseanna (Jean Smart) begins using less-than-legal tactics to win the case.
| 16 | 4 | "Queen of Snark" | Paul McCrane | David E. Kelley | October 12, 2011 | 2J6104 | 7.84 |
Harry defends the "Queen of Snark", a young girl who is believed to have driven another girl to suicide through cyberbullying. Harry goes up against Kim Mendelsohn in the case, while Tommy and Adam go head-to-head on a case involving a former client's life insurance policy. Meanwhile, Jenna decides to leave the firm to take a job with a prominent shoe designer.
| 17 | 5 | "Bad to Worse" | Thomas Carter | David E. Kelley | October 19, 2011 | 2J6105 | 8.39 |
Harry defends a science teacher (Jason Alexander) who was fired for failing a straight-A student who rejected science for religion. Things take a surprising twist when a body appears in the man's home.
| 18 | 6 | "The Rematch" | Michael Katleman | David E. Kelley & Amanda Johns & Susan Dickes | November 2, 2011 | 2J6106 | 7.28 |
Puck (Paul McCrane) goes behind the FBI (Chris Ellis) in order to bring a kidnapped child home, but is later charged by Roseanna (Jean Smart) for aiding and abetting the kidnappers. Tommy and Cassie help an elderly couple, who want to get a divorce in order to gain more money from Medicaid to pay for the husband's medical treatments.
| 19 | 7 | "American Girl" | Ron Underwood | David E. Kelley & Lawrence Broch | November 9, 2011 | 2J6107 | 7.11 |
Harry is prosecuted by a small-town sheriff (George Wendt) for being in violation of the town's "Buy American" law. Meanwhile, Chunhua (Irene Keng) brings the firm the case of a Chinese couple whose second child was stolen by the local government.
| 20 | 8 | "Insanity" | Arlene Sanford | Devon Greggory & Lawrence Broch | November 16, 2011 | 2J6108 | 7.21 |
After Cassie and Oliver begin arguing about the case of a murderer who uses the insanity plea, Harry must step in to resolve their problems. Chunhua (Irene Keng) pleads for Adam's help after her father's business is taken, and Tommy represents a man who owns overlapping businesses.
| 21 | 9 | "Head Games" | Stephen Cragg | David E. Kelley | November 30, 2011 | 2J6109 | 9.88 |
Harry and Adam argue on behalf of parents whose son died after receiving a concussive blow during a high-school football game; Harry examines the danger of football injuries to young athletes; Tommy represents a single mother who robbed a bank.
| 22 | 10 | "Purple Hearts" | Gil Junger | Christopher Ambrose & Lawrence Broch | December 7, 2011 | 2J6110 | 7.08 |
Harry represents a woman charged with the murder of her 3-day-old baby, initially using the defense of mercy killing. Tommy and Adam, meanwhile, fight for a veteran who was denied a Purple Heart.
| 23 | 11 | "Gorilla My Dreams" | Bill D'Elia | David E. Kelley & Amanda Johns | January 11, 2012 | 2J6111 | 8.39 |
Harry and Tommy fight for the rights of a gorilla that has been hidden on a hunting preserve, while Adam, Oliver, and Cassie represent a woman (Erica Durance) who takes revenge on abusive men while masquerading as Wonder Woman.
| 24 | 12 | "New Kidney on the Block" | Mike Listo | David E. Kelley & Susan Dickes | January 18, 2012 | 2J6112 | 6.41 |
Harry, Cassie and Adam represent a quick-witted 21-year-old dying of kidney failure who illegally purchased a kidney from a willing donor/seller. Meanwhile, Tommy and Oliver defend identical twins who are both arrested when the man they are both married to and live with is murdered. Roseanna Remmick is convinced that one of the twins must be responsible, leaving Tommy and Oliver to walk the line between truth and justice in hopes of keeping both of them out of jail.
| 25 | 13 | "After the Lovin'" | Bill D'Elia | David E. Kelley | March 11, 2012 (NBC); March 9, 2012 (Global) | 2J6113 | 9.05 |
Harry walks the halls of her old law firm with her client as she prepares to meet with rival attorney Sam Berman. "Your attorney used to be a valued member of our firm. It was a shame to see her go," Berman says before Harry corrects him. "They fired me." Harry represents Earl Connolly, the grieving husband of a woman who died from smoking, and Berman represents the cigarette company being sued. Berman offers a settlement of one $123,000. "For a dead wife?" Harry asks as she quickly rejects the offer. Berman warns Harry that she doesn't want to go to trial; the client's wife freely smoked cigarettes for 35 years, and the company will keep the lawsuit tied up in litigation for years before the case even sees trial. Harry's not afraid of the battle ahead and leaves with her client ready for the litigation war that awaits them.
| 26 | 14 | "Les Horribles" | Mike Listo | David E. Kelley | March 18, 2012 (NBC); March 16, 2012 (Global) | 2J6114 | 7.97 |
Harry defends a school principal who wants to expel a student; Harry helps defend a former client who believes his sister was murdered by her husband; a former classmate approaches Adam for help with her plea bargain; Tommy prepares for a gala.
| 27 | 15 | "Search and Seize" | Jonathan Pontell | Lawrence Broch & Christopher Ambrose & David E. Kelley | March 25, 2012 (NBC); March 23, 2012 (Global) | 2J6115 | 8.09 |
Harry defends a teacher who's accused of being a sex offender. Oliver represents a couple that wants to force their child into attending college; the shoe store employees go on strike.
| 28 | 16 | "The Lying Game" | Tom Verica | David E. Kelley | April 8, 2012 (NBC); April 6, 2012 (Global) | 2J6116 | 7.74 |
Cassie and Oliver bring Harry up to speed on Chloe's case and the details about protecting the daughter. Harry recommends that Chloe should testify in the narrative but Oliver and Cassie are reluctant to do so. Suddenly Harry has a brainstorm; she meets with the judge and Cruickshank and tells them she wants to put Chloe on the stand knowing that she will give false testimony. The judge is speechless, but Harry says trials are rarely about the truth. The D.A. and the defense distort the truth to suit their needs. The judge reluctantly allows Harry to proceed, but if he feels they suborned perjury in any way, they will be arrested.
| 29 | 17 | "The Contest" | Mike Listo | David E. Kelley & Amanda Johns | April 15, 2012 (NBC); April 13, 2012 (Global) | 2J6117 | 8.27 |
Harry's war with her former boss escalates when she makes a large wager putting her firm on the line. In order to win, the team must strut down the catwalk at an annual Spring Gala. Meanwhile, Oliver enlists the help of Phoebe to defend a high school girl who faces felony drug trafficking charges for dealing the Morning After pill.
| 30 | 18 | "Breaking Points" | Jim Hayman | Lawrence Broch & Susan Dickes | April 22, 2012 (NBC); April 20, 2012 (Global) | 2J6118 | 8.62 |
Harry represents a juror who ran away during deliberations for a high-profile murder case; a reality-TV star is sued by her in-laws when her husband commits suicide; Cassie and Oliver try to balance their new relationship and work responsibilities.
| 31 | 19 | "And the Band Played On" | Millicent Shelton | Christopher Ambrose & Devon Greggory & David E. Kelley | April 29, 2012 (NBC); April 27, 2012 (Global) | 2J6119 | 7.33 |
Harry and Adam agree to help Phoebe in a complicated case where an entire college marching band is being charged with murder after a hazing ritual goes wrong leaving a student dead. Elsewhere, Tommy enlists the help of Cassie and Oliver to represent a man who claims he was sexually assaulted by a woman.
| 32 | 20 | "Class War" | Howard Deutch | Story by : Philippe Benard; Teleplay by : Lawrence Broch | May 6, 2012 (NBC); May 4, 2012 (Global) | 2J6120 | 7.68 |
Harry is forced to re-visit an old case when Malcolm returns with distressing news about a gang member who has wrongly been convicted of killing a cop and is sentenced to death. Meanwhile, Adam and Phoebe defend the British owner of a quaint tea shop in a rough part of town who authorities realize stole multiple works of art back in his homeland. With little time to prepare, Adam must improvise a plan to prevent this changed man from being extradited back to Britain.
| 33 | 21 | "The Whole Truth" | Ron Underwood | Amanda Johns & David E. Kelley | May 13, 2012 (NBC); May 11, 2012 (Global) | 2J6121 | 7.64 |
When Harry's client is found not guilty of raping and murdering his ex-girlfriend, the victim's father and brother take the courtroom hostage and demand a retrial. In the meantime, an old friend of Cassie's asks for her help when he and his brother get into a car accident.
| 34 | 22 | "Onward and Upward" | Mike Listo | Story by : David E. Kelley & Devon Greggory; Teleplay by : David E. Kelley | May 27, 2012 (NBC); May 25, 2012 (Global) | 2J6122 | 5.90 |
Harry's ex-husband is found dead and with Tommy's help, she defends a man accused of murdering his ex-wife. Meanwhile, Oliver tries to talk Cassie into representing a student suing a law school that practices affirmative action. Lisa Nicole Carson reprises her role as Renee Raddick from Ally McBeal.

== Awards and nominations ==
=== 64th Primetime Emmy Awards ===
- Nomination for Outstanding Lead Actress in a Drama Series (Kathy Bates)
- Nomination for Outstanding Guest Actress in a Drama Series (Jean Smart for episode "The Rematch")

== Ratings ==
| Episode | Adult 18-49 Rating | Total Viewers (in millions) | Live+7 DVR Rating (Adult 18–49) | Live+7 DVR Viewers (in millions) |
|---|---|---|---|---|
| Hosanna Roseanna | 1.2/3 | 7.53 | 1.7 | 9.80 |
| There Will Be Blood | 1.2/3 | 7.63 | 1.7 | 10.06 |
| Sins of the Father | 1.2/3 | 8.45 | —N/a | —N/a |
| Queen of Snark | 1.2/3 | 7.84 | —N/a | —N/a |
| Bad to Worse | 1.3/3 | 8.39 | —N/a | 10.76 |
| The Rematch | 1.1/3 | 7.28 | 1.6 | 9.45 |
| American Girl | 1.3/3 | 7.11 | 1.8 | 9.59 |
| Insanity | 1.1/3 | 7.21 | —N/a | —N/a |
| Head Games | 1.3/3 | 9.88 | 1.9 | 12.21 |
| Purple Hearts | 1.2/3 | 7.08 | 1.8 | 9.31 |
| Gorilla My Dreams | 1.2/3 | 8.39 | 1.8 | 10.69 |
| New Kidney on the Block | 1.1/3 | 6.41 | —N/a | 8.58 |
| After the Lovin' | 1.1/3 | 9.05 | —N/a | 10.71 |
| Les Horribles | 1.0/3 | 7.97 | 1.4 | 9.60 |
| Search and Seize | 0.8/2 | 8.09 | 1.2 | —N/a |
| The Lying Game | 1.0/3 | 7.74 | —N/a | 9.26 |
| The Contest | 0.9/3 | 8.27 | 1.3/4 | —N/a |
| Breaking Points | 0.9/3 | 8.62 | —N/a | —N/a |
| And the Band Played On | 0.8/2 | 7.33 | 1.2 | 9.06 |
| Class War | 0.8/2 | 7.68 | —N/a | —N/a |
| The Whole Truth | 1.0/3 | 7.64 | —N/a | —N/a |
| Onward and Upward | 0.7/3 | 5.90 | —N/a | —N/a |
