= List of Harry's Law episodes =

Harry's Law is an American legal dramedy television series created by David E. Kelley, which premiered on NBC on January 17, 2011. The show revolves around Harriet Korn (Kathy Bates), a recently fired patent lawyer, and her group of associates as they come together to form a unique law practice in a rundown shoe store in Cincinnati. During the course of the series, 34 episodes of Harry’s Law aired over two seasons.

== Series overview ==
Season	Episodes	Originally released	
Season	Episodes	First released	Last released
1	12	January 17, 2011	April 4, 2011
2	22	September 21, 2011	May 27, 2012

== Episodes ==
=== Season 1 (2011) ===
No. overall	No. in season	Title	Directed by	Written by	Original release date	Prod. code	US viewers (millions)
1	1	"Pilot"	Bill D'Elia	David E. Kelley	January 17, 2011	2J5901	11.07
2	2	"Heat of Passion"	Bill D'Elia	David E. Kelley	January 24, 2011	2J5902	10.43
3	3	"Innocent Man"	Stephen Cragg	David E. Kelley	January 31, 2011	2J5906	11.02
4	4	"Wheels of Justice"	Jeff Bleckner	David E. Kelley	February 7, 2011	2J5907	9.22
5	5	"A Day in the Life"	Jonathan Pontell	David E. Kelley & Christopher Ambrose	February 14, 2011	2J5908	8.51
6	6	"Bangers in the House"	Mike Listo	David E. Kelley & Lawrence Broch	February 21, 2011	2J5903	8.75
7	7	"American Dreams"	Steve Robin	Lawrence Broch & David E. Kelley	February 28, 2011	2J5905	9.20
8	8	"In the Ghetto"	Arlene Sanford	David E. Kelley & Susan Dickes	March 7, 2011	2J5909	9.59
9	9	"The Fragile Beast"	Tom Verica	David E. Kelley & Susan Dickes	March 14, 2011	2J5910	10.16
10	10	"Send in the Clowns"	Michael Pressman	David E. Kelley	March 21, 2011	2J5904	8.43
11	11	"With Friends Like These"	Bill D'Elia	David E. Kelley	March 28, 2011	2J5911	8.54
12	12	"Last Dance"	Mike Listo	David E. Kelley & Christopher Ambrose	April 4, 2011	2J5912	7.75

=== Season 2 (2011–12) ===
No. overall	No. in season	Title	Directed by	Written by	Original release date	Prod. code	US viewers (millions)
13	1	"Hosanna Roseanna"	Bill D'Elia	David E. Kelley	September 21, 2011	2J6101	7.53
14	2	"There Will Be Blood"	Bill D'Elia	David E. Kelley	September 28, 2011	2J6102	7.63
15	3	"Sins of the Father"	Mike Listo	David E. Kelley	October 5, 2011	2J6103	8.45
16	4	"Queen of Snark"	Paul McCrane	David E. Kelley	October 12, 2011	2J6104	7.84
17	5	"Bad to Worse"	Thomas Carter	David E. Kelley	October 19, 2011	2J6105	8.39
18	6	"The Rematch"	Michael Katleman	David E. Kelley & Amanda Johns & Susan Dickes	November 2, 2011	2J6106	7.28
19	7	"American Girl"	Ron Underwood	David E. Kelley & Lawrence Broch	November 9, 2011	2J6107	7.11
20	8	"Insanity"	Arlene Sanford	Devon Greggory & Lawrence Broch	November 16, 2011	2J6108	7.21
21	9	"Head Games"	Stephen Cragg	David E. Kelley	November 30, 2011	2J6109	9.88
22	10	"Purple Hearts"	Gil Junger	Christopher Ambrose & Lawrence Broch	December 7, 2011	2J6110	7.08
23	11	"Gorilla My Dreams"	Bill D'Elia	David E. Kelley & Amanda Johns	January 11, 2012	2J6111	8.39
24	12	"New Kidney on the Block"	Mike Listo	David E. Kelley & Susan Dickes	January 18, 2012	2J6112	6.41
25	13	"After the Lovin'"	Bill D'Elia	David E. Kelley	March 11, 2012 (NBC); March 9, 2012 (Global)	2J6113	9.05
26	14	"Les Horribles"	Mike Listo	David E. Kelley	March 18, 2012 (NBC); March 16, 2012 (Global)	2J6114	7.97
27	15	"Search and Seize"	Jonathan Pontell	Lawrence Broch & Christopher Ambrose & David E. Kelley	March 25, 2012 (NBC); March 23, 2012 (Global)	2J6115	8.09
28	16	"The Lying Game"	Tom Verica	David E. Kelley	April 8, 2012 (NBC); April 6, 2012 (Global)	2J6116	7.74
29	17	"The Contest"	Mike Listo	David E. Kelley & Amanda Johns	April 15, 2012 (NBC); April 13, 2012 (Global)	2J6117	8.27
30	18	"Breaking Points"	Jim Hayman	Lawrence Broch & Susan Dickes	April 22, 2012 (NBC); April 20, 2012 (Global)	2J6118	8.62
31	19	"And the Band Played On"	Millicent Shelton	Christopher Ambrose & Devon Greggory & David E. Kelley	April 29, 2012 (NBC); April 27, 2012 (Global)	2J6119	7.33
32	20	"Class War"	Howard Deutch	Story by : Philippe Benard; Teleplay by : Lawrence Broch	May 6, 2012 (NBC); May 4, 2012 (Global)	2J6120	7.68
33	21	"The Whole Truth"	Ron Underwood	Amanda Johns & David E. Kelley	May 13, 2012 (NBC); May 11, 2012 (Global)	2J6121	7.64
34	22	"Onward and Upward"	Mike Listo	Story by : David E. Kelley & Devon Greggory; Teleplay by : David E. Kelley	May 27, 2012 (NBC); May 25, 2012 (Global)	2J6122	5.90
