= List of awards and nominations received by Law & Order: Special Victims Unit =

Law & Order: Special Victims Unit awards and nominations
Awards and nominations
Award	Wins	Nominations
ACE Eddie Awards	0	4
ALMA Awards	1	3
ASCAP Film and Television Music Awards	2	2
Astra Awards	2	5
BMI Film and TV Awards	10	10
Edgar Awards	2	12
Environmental Media Awards	1	2
Genesis Awards	0	1
GLAAD Media Awards	0	5
Golden Globe Awards	1	1
Golden Reel Awards	0	2
Gracie Awards	5	5
HCA Awards	0	2
Humanitas Prize	0	2
Imagen Awards	4	16
NAACP Image Awards	3	14
People's Choice Awards	3	31
Primetime Emmy Awards	6	24
PRISM Awards	4	39
Producers Guild of America Awards	0	1
Q Awards	0	1
Satellite Awards	1	3
Screen Actors Guild Awards	0	6
Television Academy Honors	1	1
TV Guide Awards	0	4
TV Land Awards	0	1
Women's Image Awards	0	1
Writers Guild of America Awards	0	2
Young Artist Awards	0	8

Totals (Note: Certain award groups do not simply award one winner. They acknowledge several different recipients, have runners-up, and have third place. Since this is a specific recognition and is different from losing an award, runner-up mentions are considered wins in this award tally. For simplification and to avoid errors, each award in this list has been presumed to have had a prior nomination.)
- Wins: 46
- Nominations: 208

Law & Order: Special Victims Unit is an American police procedural, legal, crime drama television series created and produced by Dick Wolf. The series premiered on NBC on September 20, 1999 as the first spin-off of crime drama, Law & Order. Law & Order: Special Victims Unit centers on the detectives of the Special Victims Unit in the fictional 16th Precinct of the New York City Police Department.

Law & Order: Special Victims Unit has won and been nominated for numerous awards for the series' actors, writers, and producers. Mariska Hargitay has been nominated for Emmy Awards many times, eventually winning it in 2006 for Outstanding Lead Actress in a Drama Series, and a Golden Globe in the category for Best Performance by an Actress in a Television Series – Drama, for her portrayal of Detective Olivia Benson in 2005. Hargitay is the first performer from any member of the Law & Order franchise to win an Emmy and a Golden Globe for an acting role.

== Awards and nominations ==
Awards and nominations received by Law & Order: Special Victims Unit
Award	Year (Note: The listed year refers to the date of the ceremony, not necessarily the year in which the corresponding season or episode aired)	Category	Nominee(s)	Result	Ref.
ACE Eddie Awards	2004	Best Edited One-Hour Series for Television	Douglas Ibold, Bonnie Koehler (for "Loss")	Nominated	
ACE Eddie Awards	2008	Best Edited One-Hour Series for Commercial Television	Karen I. Stern (for "Paternity")	Nominated	
ACE Eddie Awards	2009	Best Edited One-Hour Series for Commercial Television	Karen I. Stern (for "Authority")	Nominated	
ACE Eddie Awards	2010	Best Edited One-Hour Series for Commercial Television	Karen I. Stern (for "Hardwired")	Nominated	
ALMA Awards	2006	Outstanding Script for a Television Drama or Comedy	Jose Molina (for "Alien")	Won	
ALMA Awards	2008	Outstanding Writing for a Television Series	Mick Betancourt (for "Fight")	Nominated	
ALMA Awards	2012	Favorite TV Actor	Danny Pino	Nominated	
ASCAP Film and Television Music Awards	2005	Top TV Series	Atli Örvarsson (Note: Shared with Law & Order)	Won	
ASCAP Film and Television Music Awards	2006	Top TV Series	Atli Örvarsson (Note: Shared with Law & Order and Law & Order: Criminal Intent)	Won	
Astra Awards	2023	Best Broadcast Network Series, Drama	Law & Order: Special Victims Unit	Nominated	
Astra Awards	2024	Best Broadcast Network Drama Series	Law & Order: Special Victims Unit	Nominated	
Astra Awards	2024	Best Actress in a Broadcast Network or Cable Drama Series	Mariska Hargitay	Won	
Astra Awards	2024	Best Directing in a Broadcast Network or Cable Drama Series	Mariska Hargitay (for "Children of Wolves")	Won	
Astra Awards	2024	Best Writing in a Broadcast Network or Cable Drama Series	David Graziano, Julie Martin (for "Combat Fatigue")	Nominated	
Astra Creative Arts Awards	2023	Best Guest Actor in a Drama Series	Bradley Whitford (for "King of the Moon")	Nominated	
BMI Film and TV Awards	2001	BMI TV Music Award	Mike Post (Note: Shared with NYPD Blue and Law & Order)	Won	
BMI Film and TV Awards	2002	BMI TV Music Award	Mike Post	Won	
BMI Film and TV Awards	2003	BMI TV Music Award	Mike Post (Note: Shared with Law & Order, NYPD Blue, and Law & Order: Criminal Intent)	Won	
BMI Film and TV Awards	2004	BMI TV Music Award	Mike Post	Won	
BMI Film and TV Awards	2005	BMI TV Music Award	Mike Post (Note: Shared with Law & Order, Law & Order: Criminal Intent, and Law & Order: Trial by Jury)	Won	
BMI Film and TV Awards	2006	BMI TV Music Award	Mike Post	Won	
BMI Film and TV Awards	2007	BMI TV Music Award	Mike Post	Won	
BMI Film and TV Awards	2008	BMI TV Music Award	Mike Post	Won	
BMI Film and TV Awards	2009	BMI TV Music Award	Mike Post	Won	
BMI Film and TV Awards	2010	BMI TV Music Award	Mike Post	Won	
Edgar Awards	2001	Best Episode in a TV Series	Michael R. Perry (for "Limitations")	Won	
Edgar Awards	2001	Best Episode in a TV Series	Michael R. Perry (for "Remorse")	Nominated	
Edgar Awards	2002	Best Episode in a TV Series	Dawn DeNoon, Lisa Marie Petersen (for "Countdown")	Nominated	
Edgar Awards	2003	Best Episode in a TV Series	Dawn DeNoon, Lisa Marie Petersen (for "Waste")	Won	
Edgar Awards	2004	Best Episode in a TV Series	Jonathan Greene (for "Coerced")	Nominated	
Edgar Awards	2006	Best Episode in a TV Series	Patrick Harbinson (for "911")	Nominated	
Edgar Awards	2009	Best Episode in a TV Series	Paul Grellong (for "Streetwise")	Nominated	
Edgar Awards	2009	Best Episode in a TV Series	Judith McCreary (for "Signature")	Nominated	
Edgar Awards	2012	Best Episode in a TV Series	Speed Weed (for "Mask")	Nominated	
Edgar Awards	2014	Best Episode in a TV Series	Kevin Fox, Peter Blauner (for "Legitimate Rape")	Nominated	
Edgar Awards	2018	Best Episode in a TV Series	Michael Chernuchin (for "Something Happened")	Nominated	
Edgar Awards	2023	Best Episode in a TV Series	Brianna Yellen, Monet Hurst-Mendoza, Kathy Dobie (for "Eighteen Wheels a Predator")	Nominated	
Environmental Media Awards	2006	Turner Award	"Rockabye"	Won	
Environmental Media Awards	2007	Television Episodic – Drama	"Loophole"	Nominated	
Genesis Awards	2009	Television – Dramatic Series	"Wildlife"	Nominated	
GLAAD Media Awards	2004	Outstanding Individual Episode	"Fallacy"	Nominated	
GLAAD Media Awards	2006	Outstanding Individual Episode	"Alien"	Nominated	
GLAAD Media Awards	2008	Outstanding Individual Episode	"Sin"	Nominated	
GLAAD Media Awards	2019	Outstanding Individual Episode	"Service"	Nominated	
GLAAD Media Awards	2020	Outstanding Individual Episode	"Murdered at a Bad Address"	Nominated	
Golden Globe Awards	2005	Best Performance by an Actress in a Television Series – Drama	Mariska Hargitay	Won	
Golden Reel Awards	2001	Best Sound Editing – Television Episodic – Dialogue & ADR	Jeffrey Kaplan, Norval D. Crutcher III (Note: Additional crew: Michael Trifman, Andy Rose (assistant ADR editors), Bill Daly (production mixer), Bill Nicholson (re-recording mixer), Herman De La Cruz (ADR mixer), Angel Cox (ADR recordist)) (for "Baby Killer")	Nominated	
Golden Reel Awards	2008	Best Sound Editing in Television Short Form – Dialogue and Automated Dialogue Replacement	Jeffrey Kaplan, Jeff Kushner, Michael Jacobi, Alex Parker, Kirk Herzbrun (for "Paternity")	Nominated	
Gracie Awards	2004	Outstanding Lead Actor – Drama Series	Mariska Hargitay	Won	
Gracie Awards	2007	Outstanding Drama Series	Law & Order: Special Victims Unit	Won	
Gracie Awards	2009	Outstanding Female Lead – Drama	Mariska Hargitay	Won	
Gracie Awards	2014	Outstanding Female Actor in a Leading Role in a Drama	Mariska Hargitay	Won	
Gracie Awards	2017	Actress in a Leading Role – Drama	Mariska Hargitay	Won	
HCA Awards	2021	Best Actress in a Broadcast Network or Cable Series, Drama	Mariska Hargitay	Nominated	
HCA Awards	2022	Best Broadcast Network Series, Drama	Law & Order: Special Victims Unit	Nominated	
Humanitas Prize	2007	60 Minute	Jonathan Greene (for "Ripped")	Nominated	
Humanitas Prize	2010	60 Minute	Amanda Green (for "Swing")	Nominated	
Imagen Awards	2012	Best Primetime Program	Law & Order: Special Victims Unit	Nominated	
Imagen Awards	2013	Best Actor – Television	Danny Pino	Nominated	
Imagen Awards	2014	Best Primetime Television Program – Drama or Comedy	Law & Order: Special Victims Unit	Nominated	
Imagen Awards	2014	Best Actor – Television	Danny Pino	Nominated	
Imagen Awards	2015	Best Primetime Television Program – Drama	Law & Order: Special Victims Unit	Won	
Imagen Awards	2015	Best Supporting Actor – Television	Danny Pino	Won	
Imagen Awards	2018	Best Primetime Television Program – Drama	Law & Order: Special Victims Unit	Nominated	
Imagen Awards	2018	Best Supporting Actor – Television	Raúl Esparza	Nominated	
Imagen Awards	2020	Best Primetime Program – Drama	Law & Order: Special Victims Unit	Won	
Imagen Awards	2020	Best Supporting Actor – Television	Guillermo Díaz	Nominated	
Imagen Awards	2020	Best Supporting Actress – Television	Manni L. Perez	Won	
Imagen Awards	2020	Best Director – Television	Batan Silva	Nominated	
Imagen Awards	2021	Best Supporting Actor – Television (Drama)	Raúl Esparza	Nominated	
Imagen Awards	2021	Best Supporting Actress – Television (Drama)	Eva Noblezada	Nominated	
Imagen Awards	2021	Best Director – Television	Norberto Barba	Nominated	
Imagen Awards	2024	Best Drama Series	Law & Order: Special Victims Unit	Nominated	
NAACP Image Awards	2002	Outstanding Supporting Actor in a Drama Series	Ice-T	Won	
NAACP Image Awards	2002	Outstanding Supporting Actress in a Drama Series	Khandi Alexander	Nominated	
NAACP Image Awards	2002	Outstanding Supporting Actress in a Drama Series	CCH Pounder	Nominated	
NAACP Image Awards	2003	Outstanding Supporting Actress in a Drama Series	Pam Grier	Nominated	
NAACP Image Awards	2004	Outstanding Supporting Actor in a Drama Series	Ice-T	Nominated	
NAACP Image Awards	2004	Outstanding Supporting Actress in a Drama Series	Pam Grier	Nominated	
NAACP Image Awards	2009	Outstanding Directing in a Drama Series	Eriq La Salle (for "PTSD")	Nominated	
NAACP Image Awards	2010	Outstanding Supporting Actor in a Drama Series	Delroy Lindo	Won	
NAACP Image Awards	2011	Outstanding Drama Series	Law & Order: Special Victims Unit	Nominated	
NAACP Image Awards	2011	Outstanding Writing in a Drama Series	Judith McCreary (for "Disabled")	Nominated	
NAACP Image Awards	2012	Outstanding Drama Series	Law & Order: Special Victims Unit	Won	
NAACP Image Awards	2012	Outstanding Supporting Actor in a Drama Series	Ice-T	Nominated	
NAACP Image Awards	2012	Outstanding Supporting Actress in a Drama Series	Anika Noni Rose	Nominated	
NAACP Image Awards	2015	Outstanding Writing in a Drama Series	Warren Leight, Julie Martin (for "American Disgrace")	Nominated	
People's Choice Awards	2004	Favorite TV Dramatic Series	Law & Order: Special Victims Unit	Nominated	
People's Choice Awards	2006	Favorite TV Dramatic Series	Law & Order: Special Victims Unit	Nominated	
People's Choice Awards	2008	Favorite TV Dramatic Series	Law & Order: Special Victims Unit	Nominated	
People's Choice Awards	2008	Favorite Scene Stealing Star	Richard Belzer	Nominated	
People's Choice Awards	2009	Favorite Female TV Star	Mariska Hargitay	Nominated	
People's Choice Awards	2009	Favorite Scene Stealing Guest Star	Robin Williams	Won	
People's Choice Awards	2009	Favorite Scene Stealing Guest Star	Luke Perry	Nominated	
People's Choice Awards	2010	Favorite TV Drama Actress	Mariska Hargitay	Nominated	
People's Choice Awards	2011	Favorite TV Crime Drama	Law & Order: Special Victims Unit	Nominated	
People's Choice Awards	2011	Favorite TV Crime Fighter	Mariska Hargitay	Nominated	
People's Choice Awards	2014	Favorite Dramatic TV Actress	Mariska Hargitay	Nominated	
People's Choice Awards	2016	Favorite TV Crime Drama Actress	Mariska Hargitay	Nominated	
People's Choice Awards	2017	Favorite TV Crime Drama	Law & Order: Special Victims Unit	Nominated	
People's Choice Awards	2017	Favorite TV Crime Drama Actress	Mariska Hargitay	Nominated	
People's Choice Awards	2018	The Drama TV Star of 2018	Mariska Hargitay	Won	
People's Choice Awards	2019	The Bingeworthy Show of 2019	Law & Order: Special Victims Unit	Nominated	
People's Choice Awards	2020	The Drama Show of 2020	Law & Order: Special Victims Unit	Nominated	
People's Choice Awards	2020	The Drama TV Star of 2020	Mariska Hargitay	Nominated	
People's Choice Awards	2020	The Female TV Star of 2020	Mariska Hargitay	Nominated	
People's Choice Awards	2021	The Show of 2021	Law & Order: Special Victims Unit	Nominated	
People's Choice Awards	2021	The Drama Show of 2021	Law & Order: Special Victims Unit	Nominated	
People's Choice Awards	2021	The Drama TV Star of 2021	Mariska Hargitay	Nominated	
People's Choice Awards	2021	The Female TV Star of 2021	Mariska Hargitay	Nominated	
People's Choice Awards	2022	The Drama Show of 2022	Law & Order: Special Victims Unit	Nominated	
People's Choice Awards	2022	The Drama TV Star of 2022	Mariska Hargitay	Won	
People's Choice Awards	2022	The Female TV Star of 2022	Mariska Hargitay	Nominated	
People's Choice Awards	2022	The Male TV Star of 2022	Ice-T	Nominated	
People's Choice Awards	2024	The Show of the Year	Law & Order: Special Victims Unit	Nominated	
People's Choice Awards	2024	The Drama Show of the Year	Law & Order: Special Victims Unit	Nominated	
People's Choice Awards	2024	The Drama TV Star of the Year	Mariska Hargitay	Nominated	
People's Choice Awards	2024	The Female TV Star of the Year	Mariska Hargitay	Nominated	
Primetime Emmy Awards	2004	Outstanding Lead Actress in a Drama Series	Mariska Hargitay (for "Control")	Nominated	
Primetime Emmy Awards	2005	Outstanding Lead Actress in a Drama Series	Mariska Hargitay (for "Charisma")	Nominated	
Primetime Emmy Awards	2006	Outstanding Lead Actor in a Drama Series	Christopher Meloni (for "Ripped")	Nominated	
Primetime Emmy Awards	2006	Outstanding Lead Actress in a Drama Series	Mariska Hargitay (for "911")	Won	
Primetime Emmy Awards	2007	Outstanding Lead Actress in a Drama Series	Mariska Hargitay (for "Florida")	Nominated	
Primetime Emmy Awards	2008	Outstanding Lead Actress in a Drama Series	Mariska Hargitay (for "Undercover")	Nominated	
Primetime Emmy Awards	2009	Outstanding Lead Actress in a Drama Series	Mariska Hargitay (for "PTSD")	Nominated	
Primetime Emmy Awards	2010	Outstanding Lead Actress in a Drama Series	Mariska Hargitay (for "Perverted")	Nominated	
Primetime Emmy Awards	2011	Outstanding Lead Actress in a Drama Series	Mariska Hargitay (for "Rescue")	Nominated	
Primetime Creative Arts Emmy Awards	2000	Outstanding Guest Actress in a Drama Series	Jane Alexander (for "Entitled")	Nominated	
Primetime Creative Arts Emmy Awards	2000	Outstanding Guest Actress in a Drama Series	Tracy Pollan (for "Closure")	Nominated	
Primetime Creative Arts Emmy Awards	2002	Outstanding Guest Actress in a Drama Series	Martha Plimpton (for "Denial")	Nominated	
Primetime Creative Arts Emmy Awards	2003	Outstanding Guest Actress in a Drama Series	Barbara Barrie (for "Perfect")	Nominated	
Primetime Creative Arts Emmy Awards	2004	Outstanding Guest Actress in a Drama Series	Mare Winningham (for "Manic")	Nominated	
Primetime Creative Arts Emmy Awards	2004	Outstanding Guest Actress in a Drama Series	Marlee Matlin (for "Painless")	Nominated	
Primetime Creative Arts Emmy Awards	2005	Outstanding Guest Actress in a Drama Series	Amanda Plummer (for "Weak")	Won	
Primetime Creative Arts Emmy Awards	2005	Outstanding Guest Actress in a Drama Series	Angela Lansbury (Note: Shared with Law & Order: Trial by Jury) (for "Night")	Nominated	
Primetime Creative Arts Emmy Awards	2007	Outstanding Guest Actress in a Drama Series	Marcia Gay Harden (for "Informed")	Nominated	
Primetime Creative Arts Emmy Awards	2007	Outstanding Guest Actress in a Drama Series	Leslie Caron (for "Recall")	Won	
Primetime Creative Arts Emmy Awards	2008	Outstanding Guest Actor in a Drama Series	Robin Williams (for "Authority")	Nominated	
Primetime Creative Arts Emmy Awards	2008	Outstanding Guest Actress in a Drama Series	Cynthia Nixon (for "Alternate")	Won	
Primetime Creative Arts Emmy Awards	2009	Outstanding Guest Actress in a Drama Series	Ellen Burstyn (for "Swing")	Won	
Primetime Creative Arts Emmy Awards	2009	Outstanding Guest Actress in a Drama Series	Brenda Blethyn (for "Persona")	Nominated	
Primetime Creative Arts Emmy Awards	2009	Outstanding Guest Actress in a Drama Series	Carol Burnett (for "Ballerina")	Nominated	
2010	Outstanding Guest Actress in a Drama Series	Ann-Margret (for "Bedtime")	Won		
PRISM Awards	2000	TV Prime Time Drama Series Episode	"Wanderlust" (Note: Received PRISM Commendation)	Nominated	
PRISM Awards	2001	TV Drama Series Episode	"Bad Blood" (Note: Received PRISM Certificate of Merit)	Nominated	
PRISM Awards	2001	TV Drama Series Episode	"Taken"	Nominated	
PRISM Awards	2002	TV Drama Series Episode	"Consent"	Nominated	
PRISM Awards	2002	TV Drama Series Episode	"Sacrifice"	Nominated	
PRISM Awards	2003	TV Drama Series Episode	"Counterfeit"	Nominated	
PRISM Awards	2003	TV Drama Series Episode	"Denial"	Nominated	
PRISM Awards	2003	TV Drama Series Episode	"Dolls"	Nominated	
PRISM Awards	2004	TV Drama Series Episode	"Choice"	Won	
PRISM Awards	2004	TV Drama Series Episode	"Risk"	Nominated	
PRISM Awards	2004	TV Drama Series Episode	"Mother"	Nominated	
PRISM Awards	2004	Performance in a TV Drama Series Episode	Christopher Meloni	Nominated	
PRISM Awards	2004	Performance in a TV Drama Series Episode	Mariska Hargitay	Nominated	
PRISM Awards	2005	TV Drama Series Episode	"Criminal"	Nominated	
PRISM Awards	2005	TV Drama Series Episode	"Haunted"	Nominated	
PRISM Awards	2006	TV Drama Series Episode	"Blood"	Nominated	
PRISM Awards	2006	TV Drama Series Episode	"Intoxicated"	Nominated	
PRISM Awards	2006	TV Drama Series Episode	"Ripped"	Nominated	
PRISM Awards	2006	TV Drama Series Episode	"Strain"	Nominated	
PRISM Awards	2006	Performance in a Drama Series Episode	Melinda Dillon	Nominated	
PRISM Awards	2007	Performance in a Drama Series Episode	Mariska Hargitay	Won	
PRISM Awards	2007	Performance in a Drama Series Episode	Diane Neal	Nominated	
PRISM Awards	2007	Bipolar Disorder Award	"Influence"	Nominated	
PRISM Awards	2007	Mental Health Award	"Uncle"	Nominated	
PRISM Awards	2008	Drama Series Episode	"Responsible"	Nominated	
PRISM Awards	2008	Performance in a Drama Series Episode	Christopher Meloni	Nominated	
PRISM Awards	2009	Drama Series Episode – Mental Health	"Swing"	Won	
PRISM Awards	2009	Performance in a Drama Series Episode	Christopher Meloni	Nominated	
PRISM Awards	2009	Performance in a Drama Series Episode	Ellen Burstyn	Nominated	
PRISM Awards	2010	Drama Series Episode – Mental Health	"Snatched"	Nominated	
PRISM Awards	2010	Drama Series Episode – Substance Use	"Hammered"	Won	
PRISM Awards	2010	Performance in a Drama Series Episode	Dann Florek	Nominated	
PRISM Awards	2011	Drama Series Episode – Substance Use	"Gray"	Nominated	
PRISM Awards	2011	Performance in a Drama Series Episode	Christine Lahti	Nominated	
PRISM Awards	2012	Drama Series Episode – Mental Health	"Educated Guess"	Nominated	
PRISM Awards	2014	Drama Series Episode – Mental Health	"Born Psychopath"	Nominated	
PRISM Awards	2014	Drama Multi-Episode Storyline – Mental Health	"Surrender Benson" / "American Tragedy"	Nominated	
PRISM Awards	2014	Female Performance in a Drama Series Multi-Episode Storyline	Mariska Hargitay	Nominated	
PRISM Awards	2015	Drama Series Episode – Mental Health	"Gambler's Fallacy"	Nominated	
Producers Guild of America Awards	2000	Outstanding Producer of Episodic Television	Dick Wolf, Robert Palm	Nominated	
Q Awards	2000	Best Actress in a Quality Drama Series	Mariska Hargitay	Nominated	
Satellite Awards	2000	Best Performance by an Actress in a Series, Drama	Mariska Hargitay	Nominated	
Satellite Awards	2004	Best Television Series, Drama	Law & Order: Special Victims Unit	Nominated	
Satellite Awards	2006	Outstanding Guest Star	Jerry Lewis	Won	
Screen Actors Guild Awards	2004	Outstanding Performance by a Female Actor in a Drama Series	Mariska Hargitay	Nominated	
Screen Actors Guild Awards	2005	Outstanding Performance by a Female Actor in a Drama Series	Mariska Hargitay	Nominated	
Screen Actors Guild Awards	2006	Outstanding Performance by a Female Actor in a Drama Series	Mariska Hargitay	Nominated	
Screen Actors Guild Awards	2008	Outstanding Performance by a Female Actor in a Drama Series	Mariska Hargitay	Nominated	
Screen Actors Guild Awards	2009	Outstanding Performance by a Female Actor in a Drama Series	Mariska Hargitay	Nominated	
Screen Actors Guild Awards	2010	Outstanding Performance by a Female Actor in a Drama Series	Mariska Hargitay	Nominated	
Television Academy Honors	2008	Honoree (Note: Law & Order: Special Victims Unit was honored for the episode "Harm")		Honored	
TV Guide Awards	2000	Favorite New Series	Law & Order: Special Victims Unit	Nominated	
TV Guide Awards	2000	Favorite Actress in a New Series	Mariska Hargitay	Nominated	
TV Guide Awards	2012	Favorite Actress	Mariska Hargitay	Nominated	
TV Guide Awards	2014	Favorite Actress	Mariska Hargitay	Nominated	
TV Land Awards	2007	Favorite Lady Gumshoe	Mariska Hargitay	Nominated	
Women's Image Awards	2005	Actress Drama Series	Mariska Hargitay (for "Charisma")	Nominated	
Writers Guild of America Awards	2004	Television: Episodic Drama	Michele Fazekas, Tara Butters (for "Loss")	Nominated	
Writers Guild of America Awards	2004	Television: Episodic Drama	Michele Fazekas, Tara Butters (for "Abomination")	Nominated	
Young Artist Awards	2003	Best Performance in a TV Drama Series – Guest Starring Young Actor	Jason Fuchs	Nominated	
Young Artist Awards	2009	Best Performance in a TV Drama Series – Guest Starring Young Actor	Braeden Lemasters	Nominated	
Young Artist Awards	2012	Best Performance in a TV Series – Guest Starring Young Actor 14–17	Sterling Beaumon	Nominated	
Young Artist Awards	2013	Best Performance in a TV Series – Guest Starring Young Actress Ten and Under	Emma Rayne Lyle	Nominated	
Young Artist Awards	2016	Best Performance in a TV Series – Guest Starring Young Actress (14–21)	Danika Yarosh	Nominated	
Young Artist Awards	2016	Best Performance in a TV Series – Guest Starring Young Actress (14–21)	Madison Grace	Nominated	
Young Artist Awards	2018	Best Performance in a TV Series – Guest Starring Teen Actress	Brighton Sharbino	Nominated	
Young Artist Awards	2019	Best Performance in a TV Series – Guest Starring Young Actress	Scarlett Lopez	Nominated	
