= Television Academy Honors Award =

Annual awards for socially conscious TV

The Television Academy Honors annually awards television programs with socially conscious approaches to social issues.

== History ==
The Television Academy Honors were established in 2008 to recognize "Television with a Conscience"—television programming that inspires, informs, motivates and even has the power to change lives.

The presentation in 2023 was cancelled due to the then Writers Guild of America strike.

== Honorees ==
=== 2000s ===
1st Annual (2008)

- Alive Day Memories: Home from Iraq
- Boston Legal
- Girl Positive
- God's Warriors
- Law & Order: Special Victims Unit, "Harm"
- Pictures of Hollis Woods
- Planet Earth
- Shame
- Side Order of Life

2nd Annual (2009)

- A Home for the Holidays (10th Annual)
- Breaking the Huddle: The Integration of College Football
- Brothers & Sisters, "Prior Commitments"
- Extreme Makeover Home Edition, "The Martirez & Malek Families"
- Masterpiece Contemporary: "God on Trial"
- Stand Up to Cancer
- 30 Days
- Whale Wars

=== 2010s ===
3rd Annual (2010)

- CSI: Crime Scene Investigation: "Coup de Grace"
- Glee: "Wheels"
- Grandpa, Do You Know Who I Am? with Maria Shriver
- National Geographic Explorer" "Inside Death Row"
- Private Practice: "Nothing To Fear"
- Taking Chance
- Unlocking Autism
- Vanguard: "The OxyContin Express"

4th Annual (2011)

- The 16th Man
- The Big C: "Taking the Plunge"
- Friday Night Lights: "I Can't"
- Jamie Oliver's Food Revolution
- The Oprah Winfrey Show: "A Two-Day Oprah Show Event: 200 Adult Men Who Were Molested Come Forward"
- Parenthood: "Pilot"
- Private Practice: "Did You Hear What Happened to Charlotte King?"
- Wartorn 1861–2010

5th Annual (2012)

- The Dr. Oz Show
- The Five
- Harry's Law: "Head Games"
- Hot Coffee
- Men of a Certain Age: "Let the Sun Shine In"
- Rescue Me: "344"
- Women, War & Peace

6th Annual (2013)

- A Smile as Big as the Moon
- D.L. Hughley: The Endangered List
- Half the Sky: Turning Oppression Into Opportunity For Women Worldwide
- Hunger Hits Home
- The Newsroom
- Nick News with Linda Ellerbee
- One Nation Under Dog: Stories of Fear, Loss & Betrayal
- Parenthood

7th Annual (2014)

- The Big C: Hereafter
- Comedy Warriors
- The Fosters
- Mea Maxima Culpa
- Mom
- Screw You Cancer
- Vice

8th Annual (2015)

- black-ish, "Crime and Punishment"
- E:60, "Dream On: Stories of Boston's Strongest"
- The Normal Heart
- Paycheck to Paycheck: The Life & Times of Katrina Gilbert
- Transparent
- Virunga

9th Annual (2016)

- Born This Way
- Going Clear: Scientology and the Prison of Belief
- Homeland
- The Knick
- Mississippi Inferno
- Winter on Fire: Ukraine's Fight for Freedom

10th Annual (2017)

- Before the Flood
- The Night Of
- Speechless
- This Is Us
- We Will Rise: Michelle Obama's Mission to Educate Girls Around the World
- Last Week Tonight with John Oliver

11th Annual (2018)

- 13 Reasons Why
- Andi Mack
- Daughters of Destiny
- Forbidden: Undocumented and Queer in Rural America
- Full Frontal with Samantha Bee
- LA 92
- One Day at a Time

12th Annual (2019)

- Alexa & Katie
- A Million Little Things
- I Am Evidence
- My Last Days
- Pose
- Rest in Power: The Trayvon Martin Story
- RBG

=== 2020s ===
13th Annual (2020)

- 16 Shots
- At the Heart of Gold: Inside the USA Gymnastics Scandal
- Patriot Act with Hasan Minhaj
- Queen Sugar
- Unbelievable
- Watchmen

14th Annual (2021)

- For Life
- I Am Greta
- I May Destroy You
- Little America
- The Daily Show
- The Social Dilemma
- Welcome to Chechnya

15th Annual (2022)

- Black and Missing
- Dopesick
- Insecure
- It's a Sin
- Reservation Dogs
- Taste the Nation: Holiday Edition
- The Year Earth Changed

16th Annual (cancelled)

- Profiled: The Black Man
- 37 Words
- As We See It
- Mo
- The Rebellious Life of Mrs. Rosa Parks
- The U.S. and the Holocaust
- We're Here

17th Annual (2024)

- 1000% Me: Growing Up Mixed
- The 1619 Project
- A Small Light
- Beef
- Deadlocked: How America Shaped the Supreme Court
- Heartstopper
- Lakota Nation vs. United States

17th Annual (2025)

- Daughters
- Genius: MLK/X
- Greener Pastures
- Out of My Mind
- We Will Dance Again
- Will & Harper

17th Annual (2026)

- Adolescence
- Deaf President Now!
- Dying for Sex
- Heated Rivalry
- Seen & Heard: The History of Black Television
- South Park

== See also ==
- The Peabody Awards
- Academy Award for Best Documentary Feature
- Alfred I. duPont–Columbia University Award
