= Roy Black (attorney) =

American lawyer (1947–2025)

- Born: February 17, 1945; New York City, U.S.
- Died: July 21, 2025 (aged 80); Coral Gables, Florida, U.S.
- Other name: The Professor
- Education: University of Miami; University of Miami School of Law
- Occupation: Lawyer
- Years active: 1970-2025
- Spouse(s): Naomi Morris Black (m. 1984, divorced) Lea Black (m. 1994)
- Children: 2

Roy Black (February 17, 1945 – July 21, 2025) was an American civil and criminal defense trial attorney. He was a founding partner of Black Srebnick and a member of the Trial Lawyer Hall of Fame. He was known for his gaining an acquittal in 1991 of William Kennedy Smith on charges of rape and for his representation of conservative radio commentator Rush Limbaugh. He gained the only acquittal at trial in the Varsity Blues scandal for Amin Khoury, and gained the acquittal of Miami police officer William Lozano in a highly publicized retrial and whose killing of Clement Lloyd had sparked the 1989 Miami riot. He further gained the acquittal of famed racer Hélio Castroneves and his sister on charges of income tax evasion.

Among the other celebrities whom Black represented include actor Kelsey Grammer, Girls Gone Wild creator Joe Francis, artist Peter Max, financier Jeffrey Epstein and pop musician Justin Bieber. Black was also informally known by his nickname, "The Professor".

== Early life and education ==
Black was born in New York City in 1945. His parents divorced soon after his birth and his mother remarried in 1951 to a British automotive executive who moved the family to Connecticut and then to Jamaica. Black attended Jamaica College and then earned an undergraduate degree at the University of Miami in 1967 and a Juris Doctor at the University of Miami School of Law. While attending UM, Black was a member of the Zeta Epsilon chapter of Alpha Tau Omega. Following his 1970 graduation, he received the highest possible score on the Florida Bar Exam. After school, he worked as an assistant public defender. In 1973, he worked as an adjunct professor in criminal evidence at the University of Miami.

== Career ==
Until his death a partner in Black Srebnick, a Miami-based trial firm specializing in civil litigation and criminal defense, Black also served as an adjunct instructor of criminal evidence at the University of Miami School of Law. In 1983, Black represented police officer Luis Alvarez, whose killing of Nevell Johnson Jr. had sparked the 1982 Overtown riot. Alvarez was acquitted. In 1992, Black represented police officer William Lozano, whose killing of Clement Lloyd had sparked the 1989 Miami riots. Lozano was convicted, however on appeal his conviction was overturned and in a retrial in 1993 he was acquitted. In 2022, Black won an acquittal for a client charged with bribing a Georgetown University tennis coach to admit his daughter to Georgetown, ending the U.S. government's unbroken streak of convictions in the "Varsity Blues" prosecutions. In addition to his legal work, Black provided legal commentary for various NBC news shows and played the "managing partner" of The Law Firm, a short-lived reality-based television show pitting lawyers against each other week-to-week in a legal version of The Apprentice.

Roy Black was chosen as a top lawyer by Super Lawyers between 2006 and 2024.

== Personal life and death ==
Black was married three times. In 1984, he married his second wife, Naomi Morris Black, with whom he had a daughter, Nora Black (psychotherapist, San Francisco). In 1994, Roy Black married Lea Black, who had been a juror in the William Kennedy Smith trial and would later be a main cast member on The Real Housewives of Miami. They began dating several months after the trial. They had a son, RJ, who like his father, occasionally appeared on the show, for example, in a second-season episode, in which the three discuss one of Black's cases.

Black died at his home in Coral Gables, Florida, on July 21, 2025, at the age of 80.
