= The Law Firm =

- Genre: Reality competition
- Presented by: Roy Black
- Country of origin: United States
- Original language: English
- No. of seasons: 1
- No. of episodes: 8

Production
- Executive producers: David E. Kelley; David Garfinkle; Jay Renfroe; Jonathan Pontell; Robert Breech; Roy Black
- Running time: 42 minutes
- Production companies: Renegade 83 Inc. David E. Kelley Productions; 20th Century Fox Television

Original release
- Network: NBC
- Release: July 28 – August 4, 2005

The Law Firm is an American reality competition series that aired on NBC from July 28 to August 4, 2005. It features up-and-coming lawyers trying real court cases with real clients, in front of real judges and juries, resulting in outcomes that are final, legal, and binding. The grand prize is $250,000. Trial attorney and legal analyst Roy Black is the managing partner of The Law Firm. He decides who will be eliminated each week.

5.08 million viewers watched the premiere, and 4.04 million the second episode, leading NBC to pull the series off the air. The remaining episodes aired on Bravo.

== Contestants ==
- Michael Cavalluzzi
- Olivier Taillieu
- Deep Goswami
- Aileen Page
- Christopher Smith
- Keith Bruno
- Regina Silva
- Barrett Rubens
- Anika Harvey
- Barrett Elizabeth Rubens
- Jason Adams
- Kelly Chang
