= Van Wilder: Freshman Year =

2009 film by Harvey Glazer

National Lampoon's Van Wilder: Freshman Year
- DVD cover
- Directed by: Harvey Glazer
- Written by: Todd McCullough
- Based on: Characters by: Brent Goldberg; David T. Wagner
- Produced by: Robert L. Levy; Peter Abrams; Andrew Panay
- Starring: Jonathan Bennett; Kristin Cavallari; Jerry Shea; Steve Talley; Rick Calk; Ryan Stratis
- Cinematography: Shawn Maurer
- Edited by: Aden Bahadori
- Music by: Nathan Wang
- Production companies: Tapestry Films; Myriad Pictures
- Distributed by: Paramount Famous
- Release date: July 14, 2009
- Running time: 96 minutes
- Country: United States
- Language: English
- Box office: $20,543

National Lampoon's Van Wilder: Freshman Year is a 2009 American sex comedy film and the third and final installment in the Van Wilder American comedy series. Serving as a prequel to the original Van Wilder film, it was directed by Harvey Glazer and released direct-to-DVD by Paramount Famous on July 14, 2009. The movie stars Jonathan Bennett as the eponymous Van Wilder during his early college years, alongside Kristin Cavallari, Jerry Shea, and Steve Talley.

== Plot ==
Van Wilder embarks on his freshman year at Coolidge College, hoping to follow in his father's footsteps and have a memorable college experience. Upon arrival, Van discovers that the college is now under the strict control of Dean Charles Reardon, who has implemented a no-alcohol, no-partying policy.

Undeterred, Van and his new friends Farley, Yu Dum Fok, and Dirk Arnold decide to challenge the new rules and bring the party back to Coolidge College. In the process, Van clashes with the college's military cadet leader, Dirk, who disapproves of Van's partying ways.

As Van attempts to win the heart of the beautiful Kaitlin Hays (Kristin Cavallari), he also faces off against Dirk in a series of humorous and outrageous contests. Meanwhile, Van enlists the help of his friends to plan and execute epic parties, which ultimately leads to the grandest of all - a golf cart race across the college campus.

The film follows Van and his friends as they navigate the highs and lows of college life, from pursuing romantic interests to outsmarting the college's administration. Throughout the story, Van learns valuable life lessons and slowly transforms into the legendary party animal known from the original Van Wilder film.

In the end, Van triumphs over Dirk and wins Kaitlin's heart. The film concludes with a final epic party that signifies the return of the fun-loving and free-spirited atmosphere to Coolidge College, laying the foundation for the character Van Wilder eventually becomes.

== Cast ==
- Jonathan Bennett as Van Wilder
- Kristin Cavallari as Kaitlin Hayes
- Linden Ashby as Vance Wilder Sr.
- Kurt Fuller as Dean Charles Reardon
- Steve Talley as Lt. Dirk Arnold
- Nestor Aaron Absera as Farley
- Nick Nicotera as Corporal Benedict
- Jerry Shea as Yu Dum Fok
- Meredith Giangrande as Eve
- Irene Keng as Dongmei
- Brett Rice as Sergeant Hayes
- Jasmine Burke as Molly

== Home media ==
National Lampoon's Van Wilder: Freshman Year was released directly to DVD and Blu-ray on July 14, 2009, by Paramount Home Entertainment. The home media release features both an unrated and a rated version of the film, giving viewers the choice between the two editions. The unrated version contains additional scenes and extended sequences not included in the rated version.

The DVD and Blu-ray releases also include a variety of bonus features such as an audio commentary with actors Jonathan Bennett, Kristin Cavallari, and Steve Talley, as well as director Harvey Glazer. Additional extras comprise a collection of deleted scenes, a gag reel, behind-the-scenes footage, and a "making-of" documentary that provides insight into the film's production process.

Van Wilder: Freshman Year was released on DVD on July 14, 2009. As of November 2011, 226,168 DVD units have been sold, bringing in $2,994,116 in revenue.
