= Monday Mornings =

American medical drama television series

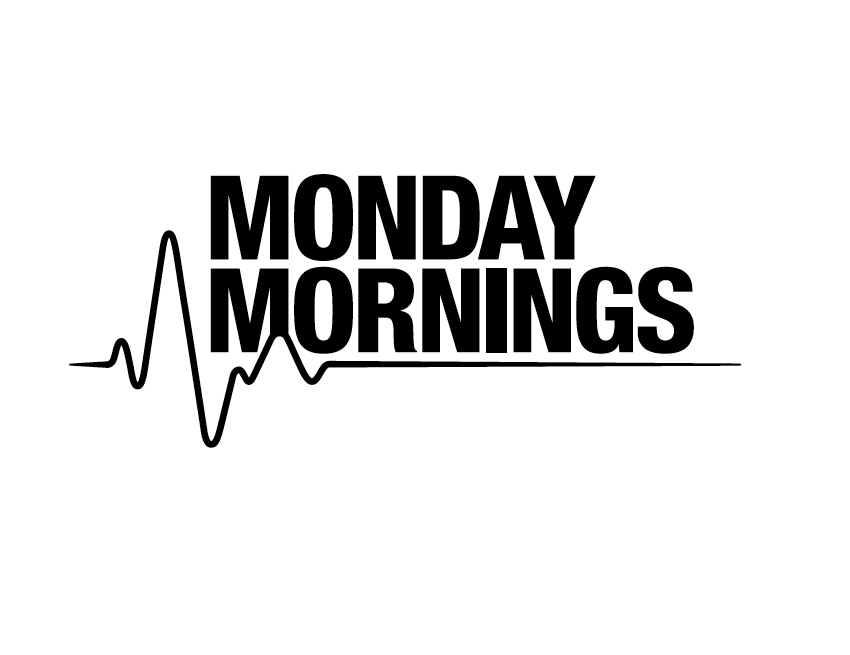
- Genre: Medical drama
- Created by: David E. Kelley
- Based on: Monday Mornings by Sanjay Gupta
- Starring: Ving Rhames; Jamie Bamber; Jennifer Finnigan; Bill Irwin; Keong Sim; Sarayu Rao; Emily Swallow; Alfred Molina
- Composer: Danny Lux
- Country of origin: United States
- Original language: English
- No. of seasons: 1
- No. of episodes: 10

Production
- Executive producers: Bill D'Elia; Sanjay Gupta; David E. Kelley
- Running time: 42 minutes
- Production companies: David E. Kelley Productions; TNT Original Productions

Original release
- Network: TNT
- Release: February 4 – April 8, 2013

Monday Mornings is an American medical drama television series created by David E. Kelley that ran on TNT from February 4 to April 8, 2013, and aired Mondays after Dallas. It is based on the 2012 novel of the same name by Sanjay Gupta. In May 2012, TNT placed a ten-episode order for the series. On May 10, 2013, TNT canceled Monday Mornings after one season, along with Southland.

== Plot ==
The series follows the professional and personal lives of five doctors at the fictional Chelsea General Hospital in Portland, Oregon. The series title refers to the weekly peer-reviewed conferences held on Monday mornings, at which the surgeons receive both praise for their accomplishments and lambasting for their mistakes, usually from the sharp-tongued and often sarcastic Dr. Hooten.

== Cast and characters ==
=== Main ===
- Alfred Molina as Chief of Staff Dr. Harding Hooten
- Ving Rhames as trauma chief Dr. Jorge "El Gato Negro" Villanueva
- Bill Irwin as transplant chief Dr. Buck Tierney
- Jamie Bamber as attending neurosurgeon Dr. Tyler Wilson
- Jennifer Finnigan as attending neurosurgeon Dr. Tina Ridgeway
- Keong Sim as attending neurosurgeon Dr. Sung Park
- Sarayu Rao as attending cardiothoracic surgeon Dr. Sydney Napur
- Emily Swallow as neurosurgical resident Dr. Michelle Robidaux

=== Recurring ===
- Jason Gray-Stanford as hospital attorney Scott Henderson
- Anthony Heald as malpractice attorney Mitch Tompkins
- Jonathan Silverman as internist Dr. John Lieberman
- Valerie Mahaffey as Fran Horowitz from Risk Management
- Ewan Chung as anaesthesiologist Dr. Wong

== Episodes ==
No.	Title	Directed by	Written by	Original release date	U.S. viewers (millions)
1	"Pilot"	Bill D'Elia	David E. Kelley	February 4, 2013	1.34
Trauma Chief Jorge Villanueva treats what appears to be an attempted suicide; Dr. Ty Wilson is shaken by the case of an 11-year-old with a soccer injury; Dr. Sydney Napur solves a case that baffles the rest of the staff.
2	"Deus Ex Machina"	Bill D'Elia	David E. Kelley & Sanjay Gupta	February 11, 2013	1.22
Doctors try to convince a 13-year-old girl to have surgery; Ty turns to Dr. Tina Ridgeway for support; Dr. Buck Tierney tries to bully a resident into pronouncing an organ donor brain dead; Sydney enlists Villanueva's help with a patient.
3	"Who's Sorry Now?"	Bill D'Elia	David E. Kelley & Karen Struck	February 18, 2013	1.25
Sung refuses to apologize to the wife of a patient who died on his table; Ty and Michelle face a moral dilemma; Sydney and Lieberman are unable to leave work behind while on a date; Buck is named in a malpractice lawsuit.
4	"Forks Over Knives"	Mike Listo	Amanda Johns & Karen Struck & David E. Kelley	February 25, 2013	1.24
The surgeons are divided over Tina's proposal to use an unorthodox procedure; Villanueva must find a way to treat a girl who refuses care; a former patient sues Sung when a successful surgery creates an unforeseen side effect.
5	"The Legend and the Fall"	Greg Hoblit	Amanda Johns & Sanjay Gupta & David E. Kelley	March 4, 2013	1.45
The surgeons question the cognitive abilities of one of the hospital's elder statesmen; a competitive swimmer has a seizure in the emergency room; Tina performs a risky procedure; Sydney criticizes Lieberman for a misdiagnosis.
6	"Communion"	Colin Bucksey	Karen Struck & David E. Kelley	March 11, 2013	1.86
Gato's son, Nick, gets into the hospital after being stabbed with a knife. Dr. Park performs surgery on Chung Mai, a violinist he admires. Dr. Buck Tierney helps a donor after her sister died before the kidney transplantation was complete.
7	"One Fine Day"	Mario Van Peebles	Sanjay Gupta & Amanda Johns & David E. Kelley	March 18, 2013	1.23
Dr. Wilson performs a craniotomy of a marine in Afghanistan remotely using a robot. Dr. Park and Gato struggle with the sister of patient in vegetative state. Dr. Napur, Dr. Ridgway with Dr. Wilson then perform a surgery on a 10 months old baby with a tumor. Finally the chief chastens Dr. Wilson for not taking a follow-up on his remote patient.
8	"Truth or Consequences"	Arlene Sanford	Karen Struck & David E. Kelley	March 25, 2013	1.32
Ioan Gruffudd guest stars as Dr. Stewart Delaney. Dr. Stewart Delany is asked to explain how a careless mistake killed his patient; Sydney and Villanueva operate on a young man with injuries from a suicide attempt; Sydney and Buck consider the waste of resources on those who can not be saved.
9	"Wheels Within Wheels"	Mike Listo	Amanda Johns & David E. Kelley & Karen Struck	April 1, 2013	1.60
Ty and Hooten believe a Supreme Court hopeful judge may have a brain tumor; an emergency room case proves to be more than Michelle can handle; Sung and Tina disagree over the course of treatment for an obsessive writer.
10	"Family Ties"	Bill D'Elia	Teleplay by : Amanda Johns & Karen Struck & David E. Kelley; Story by : Amanda Johns & Karen Struck	April 8, 2013	1.37
Hooten and Buck head to court when a grieving son refuses to comply with his mother's final wishes; Sydney is outraged over the health of an obese 16-year-old; a patient puts one of the staff in danger.

== Production ==
Filming took place at Manhattan Beach Studios in Manhattan Beach, California.

== Home media ==
As of 2014, Warner does not plan to release the series physically in the United States. As of November 2014, the only home video release was made in Germany, where Studiocanal acquired the rights and released it on DVD on November 20, 2014.

== Reception ==
=== Critical response ===
Metacritic gives the show a score of 55% based on reviews from 22 critics.
