= The Wedding Bells =

- Genre: Comedy drama
- Created by: Jason Katims; David E. Kelley
- Starring: KaDee Strickland; Teri Polo; Sarah Jones; Michael Landes; Benjamin King; Chris Williams; Missi Pyle
- Composer: Danny Lux
- Country of origin: United States
- Original language: English
- No. of seasons: 1
- No. of episodes: 7 (2 unaired)

Production
- Executive producers: Jason Katims; David E. Kelley; Jonathan Pontell
- Running time: 45–48 minutes
- Production companies: David E. Kelley Productions; 20th Century Fox Television

Original release
- Network: Fox
- Release: March 7 – April 6, 2007

The Wedding Bells is an American comedy-drama television series that aired on Fox from March 7 to April 6, 2007. The series was greenlighted after the network became interested in a series centered on wedding planners. The network approached David E. Kelley to create the show, and he essentially remade a rejected pilot he created for ABC in 2004 entitled DeMarco Affairs which starred Selma Blair, Lindsay Sloane, and Sabrina Lloyd as three sisters who inherit a wedding planner service. Though the show had a moderately strong premiere, it faded in the ratings and was cancelled after seven episodes had been produced and five episodes were aired.

== Plot ==
The Bell sisters, Annie (KaDee Strickland), Jane (Teri Polo) and Sammy Bell (Sarah Jones), inherited "The Wedding Palace" after their parents' divorce. David Conlon (Michael Landes), photographer for The Wedding Palace and ex-boyfriend of Annie's whose tension-filled dealings with her are clearly the result of pent-up sexual chemistry; and Russell Hawkins (Benjamin King), Jane's husband and the company COO; round off the cast.

Then there's wedding singer Ralph Snow (Chris Williams), who always aspired to be the next Lenny Kravitz, but instead is stuck crooning endless cover songs and retro medleys for unappreciative wedding guests. Amanda Pontell (Missi Pyle) adds to the frenzied scene as a former bridezilla client who becomes a board member of The Wedding Palace.

=== B-plots through the brief run of the series ===
- The relationship between Wedding Palace assistant Debbie (Sherri Shepherd) and another wedding singer (Cleavant Derricks in a recurring role). Her biological clock is ticking and he is cautious about getting married again, as his first marriage ended badly.
- The very rich (but socially awkward) Amanda Pontell's efforts to fit in with the three Bell sisters.
- Sammy Bell's (Sarah Jones) efforts to be seen as a whole woman, not just as a sexy woman.
- Sibling rivalry between Jane (Teri Polo) and Annie (KaDee Strickland) -- there is a history of Jane's boyfriends becoming attracted to Annie—and Jane and Sammy—Sammy has read in Jane's diary that Jane is jealous of Sammy's breasts.
- Had the series gone on, another secondary plot might have been about Russell's efforts to franchise the Wedding Palace. Christopher Rich played a potential investor with Las Vegas connections in the last aired episode.
- A couple of episodes had Heather Tom and Nicholle Tom as buxom blonde sisters who would crash weddings. Debbie would inevitably throw them out.

== Cast ==
- KaDee Strickland as Annie Bell
- Teri Polo as Jane Bell
- Sarah Jones as Sammy Bell
- Michael Landes as David Conlon
- Benjamin King as Russell Hawkins
- Chris Williams as Ralph Snow
- Missi Pyle as Amanda Pontell
- Costas Mandylor as Ernesto
- Sherri Shepherd as Debbie Quill

== Episodes ==
No.	Title	Directed by	Written by	Original release date	Prod. code
1	"For Whom the Bells Toll"	Jon Amiel	Jason Katims & David E. Kelley	March 7, 2007	1AMU01
The Bell sisters, Annie, Jane and Sammy, inherited The Wedding Palace after their parents divorce. Now they must navigate the endless complications of planning elaborate weddings while trying to figure out where they stand in their own complicated love lives.
2	"Wedding from Hell"	Arvin Brown	David E. Kelley	March 16, 2007	1AMU03
A groom raised by a gay couple has trouble convincing anyone but the bride that he's straight. Debby's ex-boyfriend Cedric comes on as a wedding singer, in order to work things out with her. Jane and Russell's problems continue.
3	"Partly Cloudy, With a Chance of Disaster"	Dennie Gordon	David E. Kelley	March 23, 2007	1AMU02
A runaway bride returns and demands for her wedding to be planned again, on the same day already reserved for a May–December couple. Meanwhile an angry former client threatens to sue The Wedding Palace for ruining her wedding day.
4	"The Fantasy"	Mel Damski	David E. Kelley	March 30, 2007	1AMU04
Sammy has a hard time discouraging a bride-to-be from wearing an outrageous dress to the ceremony and Jane decides to induce role playing into her and Russell's sex life in order to make it more spicy.
5	"The Most Beautiful Girl"	Michael Zinberg	David E. Kelley	April 6, 2007	1AMU06
Amanda Pontell begins working as a wedding planner and craftily garners new business for The Wedding Palace. After Amanda uses some slightly unethical tactics to book new clients, Sammy reminds her that money isn't the only thing that matters when planning weddings. Meanwhile, Annie and David rekindle their romance.
6	"The Mother"	N/A	N/A	Unaired	1AMU07
The Wedding Palace is turned upside-down when Kate Bell, Annie, Jane and Sammy's demanding mother, shows up for a visit with big news. Ralph is touched when Amanda calls in a favor and gets him an audition with a noted music producer. Meanwhile, the marital friction between Russell and Jane grows. Annie discourages bride Maria Connelly, who's planning a "Sound of Music" theme wedding and wants to dress accordingly.
7	"Fools in Love"	Arlene Sanford	N/A	Unaired	1AMU05
Jane suspects that a groom, Simon, may not be the doctor he claims to be, since he hesitates to step in and help when his fiancée Skippie's father is in distress at their rehearsal dinner. Meanwhile, The Wedding Palace is threatened with a lawsuit from a father who is opposed to his daughter marrying another woman.

== Reception ==
The first two episodes of The Wedding Bells garnered poor reviews and low ratings. Critics cited the superficial relationships between the sisters as a weakness. Some claim that Kelley lacked the flair to write for women, after his successful run with Ally McBeal.
