= Johnny Ray Gill =

American actor

- Born: August 26, 1984 (age 41); Portland, Oregon, U.S.
- Education: University of Southern California; Temple University (BA); University of California, San Diego (MFA)
- Occupation: Actor
- Years active: 2007–present

Johnny Ray Gill (born August 26, 1984) is an American stage and screen actor.

== Early life ==
Gill grew up in Portland, Oregon, and graduated from Jefferson High School in 2002. He attended the University of Southern California for one year before transferring to Temple University where he completed his bachelor's degree in theatre. He received his M.F.A. from the University of California, San Diego's graduate acting program.

== Filmography ==
Film
Year	Title	Role	Notes
2012	Shadow of Fear	Trey	TV movie
2016	Opening Night	Eric	
2021	Rollers	Rufus Paisley	

Television
Year	Title	Role	Notes
2011	Harry's Law	Damien Winslow	Recurring; 10 episodes
2012	Bones	Teejay Ouellette	Episode: "The Prisoner in the Pipe"
2012	True Blood	Tyrese	3 episodes
2013–2016	Rectify	Kerwin Whitman	Recurring; 7 episodes
2016	BrainDead	Gustav Triplett	13 episodes
2016–2017	Underground	Sam	8 episodes
2017	NCIS	Royce Layton	Episode: "One Book, Two Covers"
2024–present	Cross	Bobby Trey	7 episodes

Videogames
Year	Title	Role
2013	Grand Theft Auto V	The Local Population
2018	Red Dead Redemption 2	The Local Pedestrian Population
