= Harry's Law =

American legal comedy-drama television series

- Also known as: Kindreds
- Genre: Legal drama; Comedy drama
- Created by: David E. Kelley
- Starring: Kathy Bates; Nate Corddry; Brittany Snow; Aml Ameen; Karen Olivo; Mark Valley; Christopher McDonald; Justine Lupe
- Composer: Danny Lux
- Country of origin: United States
- Original language: English
- No. of seasons: 2
- No. of episodes: 34 (list of episodes)

Production
- Executive producers: David E. Kelley; Bill D'Elia
- Production locations: Cincinnati, Ohio
- Running time: 42 minutes
- Production companies: David E. Kelley Productions; Bonanza Productions; Warner Bros. Television

Original release
- Network: NBC
- Release: January 17, 2011 – May 27, 2012

Harry's Law is an American legal comedy drama series created by David E. Kelley, and starring Kathy Bates, which ran for two seasons on NBC from January 17, 2011, to May 27, 2012. On May 11, 2012, NBC announced that Harry's Law would not be renewed for a third season.

== Premise ==
Season	Episodes	Originally released	
Season	Episodes	First released	Last released
1	12	January 17, 2011	April 4, 2011
2	22	September 21, 2011	May 27, 2012

Harry's Law revolves around Harriet Korn, a recently fired patent lawyer, and her group of associates as they come together to form a unique law firm in a rundown shoe store in Cincinnati. In the second season the practice is moved upstairs to a larger office with the help of prestigious lawyer and friend Thomas "Tommy" Jefferson.

== Cast and characters ==
=== Main ===
- Kathy Bates as Harriet "Harry" Korn: Once a highly paid, top-level patent attorney, she lost all drive towards this career and was fired. She seems to be finding new passion in being a criminal defense lawyer and running her office out of a shoe store. She is sarcastic, with weather-worn dry wit, and does her best to keep up with young lawyers, who in her opinion "if they knew where they were going they wouldn't be running as fast". Harry strives to see the good in people, often defending questionable innocents even when everything says they are guilty. Gradually becomes less abrasive in the second season, culminating in singing a heartfelt song to her recently deceased first husband (whom she'd rejected as a horrible person throughout the episode).
- Nate Corddry as Adam Branch: A young attorney who careens like a billiard ball through the show; after accidentally hitting Harry with his car, he started working in Harriet's law firm, despite her demand that he leave. He greatly admires Harry's skill as a lawyer, despite the fact that during one of the trials in which he was against her she referred to him as an "arrogant little snot." He seems to have powerful women who direct or drive his interests, including Rachael, Harry, and Chunhua. He is known to have a lot of thrust towards a case, and any pretty female in the area. Last seen in a relationship with Phoebe.
- Brittany Snow as Jenna Backstrom (season 1; recurring season 2): Harry's assistant when she was a patent lawyer, and retained in the same position when Harry opens her own firm. Jenna also runs the shoe store because she loves style and fashion. It is later revealed she had a "friendly uncle" and because of that trauma her life revolves around pretty things. At times, she tends to have odd mood swings which annoys the others. She has a noticeable habit of walking into the supply closet when she is upset. Snow's most recent appearance on the show was the episode "Queen of Snark". Jenna left the firm for a job at a major shoe company in New York. She has a heartfelt goodbye with everyone from the office. Harry gives her a framed photo of the outside of the shoe store as a going-away present.
- Aml Ameen as Malcolm Davies (season 1; guest star season 2): A college student who literally fell on top of Harry when he was trying to commit suicide after getting his third strike for drug possession. After Harry defended him and got his sentence reduced to two years probation, he started working at Harry's law firm as a paralegal. He wishes to become a lawyer and Harry seems to truly wish to help him succeed. He later starts to date Jenna, but is clearly stressed by her odd mood swings. Seen briefly in the second season, with Tommy telling him at the office party in the season 2 finale "all this madness, and it all started because you jumped off a building".
- Christopher McDonald as Thomas "Tommy" Jefferson (season 2; recurring season 1): An arrogant high-priced plaintiff's attorney who is known for his commercials and big performance he puts on for each trial. Despite his arrogance, he sees Harry as a friend and is always willing to step forward to defend her, though he has a noticeable habit of referring to himself in the third person. He does not like Adam, often referring to him as rude or a bug. He used to be in the military, but during the first week he shot himself in the foot. Despite his attention-seeking behavior, he has shown more passionate and honorable traits as well. He shows to have some feelings for Harry. He eventually begins working with her at the firm, and is accepted by the team despite his antics.
- Mark Valley as Oliver Richard (season 2): Oliver was an attorney who worked at the firm that fired Harry in the first episode. He brings her the Eric Sanders case and begins working with Harry after her law firm is expanded. He has a romantic past with DA Roseanna Remmick. Has expressed romantic interest in many of the women in the office, including Cassie and Chunhua; later on in season 2, it's revealed that he slept with Cassie and is starting to date her. Despite their differences, including an argument about racism in the season finale, they remain together by the show's end.
- Karen Olivo as Cassie Reynolds (season 2): A lawyer Harry hires soon after expanding the law firm. It was revealed in "Insanity" that when Cassie was in high school, a man opened fire on campus and killed her best friend. She formerly worked in the DA's office with Roseanna Remmick. Highly strung and prone to crossing her arms when she's in an argument, she is still shown to be a gifted lawyer. Often employed by Harry to "flash some leg" at people causing her difficulties.
- Justine Lupe as Phoebe Blake (guest in season 2 episode 15; season 2, from episode 16): A young attorney who describes herself as still "cutting her teeth on normal cases" and whom Harry describes as a "paid middle-man; you take cases then shove the workload onto us". Despite this everyone seems fond of her, and whilst she isn't officially a part of Harry's team, she works with them frequently. Nicknamed "Gwyneth" by Harry due to a resemblance to Gwyneth Paltrow. Last seen in a relationship with Adam.

=== Recurring ===
- Jordana Spiro as Rachael Miller: Adam's ex-girlfriend. She is a very skilled lawyer from a very successful firm. She often gives Adam law advice, and she is jealous of Adam's feelings for Chunhua. She wants Adam to leave Harry's law firm and come back to the successful one that he used to be a part of. She later reveals to Adam that she is dating a psychiatrist named Thomas, to whom she subsequently becomes engaged. At the end of the first season finale, she kisses Adam and reveals she still has feelings for him. Didn't return for season 2.
- Paul McCrane as Josh "Puck" Peyton: A District Attorney who often goes up against Harriet in trial. He has an overzealous demeanor and a noticeable habit of repeating a phrase two or three times; he often suggests the maximum punishment with no means of backing down, which Harry describes as "shooting yourself in the foot." He has a meltdown after Harry wins her final case of the season against him, and strips bare before the court while ranting about how screwed up the justice system is and announcing his resignation from the practice of law. Harry decides to help him get back on his feet and they later become friends. He also reveals that his nickname is "Puck" because he liked to play hockey when he was younger, and says only his close friends call him that. He later becomes a defense attorney, and was later charged for alleged complicity in the kidnapping of a child by one of his clients (he had agreed to take custody of the child, without alerting authorities, and wait twenty-four hours before returning her to her parents, as a condition of the kidnapper surrendering her to him). We later learn that decision, as well as his overzealous nature as a prosecutor, both stemmed from a similar incident seven years earlier, in which he had refused to negotiate with another kidnapper, which ended with the kidnapped boy being killed. The incident had traumatized him, and he eventually lost his job and became estranged from his family, in his zeal to prove the justice system still worked. Harry took his case following the kidnapping charge and managed to get him acquitted.
- Irene Keng as Chunhua Lao: The Chinese daughter of the owner of the laundromat which is across from the firm. Adam is instantly smitten with her and takes her case when a former worker sues for being fired. They start dating after the case is closed. She was recently attacked and almost raped, suffering post traumatic stress disorder from the trauma, but after a talk with Jenna she was able to get past it. However, after Adam realizes he still has feelings for Rachael, he breaks up with Chunhua. In season two, Adam offers her a job to replace Jenna working in the shoe store. She is later described by her employees as harsh and cruel, leading to an investigation led by Harry to reveal if her actions were unfair. Tries to hand in her resignation at the end of season 2, due to feeling uncomfortable around Adam and Phoebe, but is convinced by Harry to stay because she's "part of the team".
- Johnny Ray Gill as Damien Winslow: A resident of the neighborhood and self-proclaimed CEO of Winslow Protection I.N.C. Despite first appearing as a gang banger looking for protection money, it is revealed he actually does protect the neighborhood and its residents. This is clearly demonstrated during his trial, when the entire neighborhood sits in to show their support. Nevertheless, his methods may be a bit extreme, including brutally beating and taunting Chunhua's attacker. Due to this, he is a regular client of Harriet's, who offered to defend him pro bono, in exchange for a waived protection fee. He makes it clear that he takes his job as the protector of the neighborhood very seriously and does not tolerate any sort of disturbance. Didn't return for season 2.
- Dana Sorman as Lisa Swartz: A paralegal for Tommy Jefferson. She frequently boosts Tommy's self-confidence in preparation for big cases. Lisa is also more open and promiscuous with her sexuality than other characters using this when times presents itself against other characters. Has a flirtatious/abrasive relationship with Chunhua, but they make up at the end of each debacle. Usually puts on a good performance i.e. at the law firm party or the office party for Harry's firm.
- Rashad Hood as Lewis Epps: A former gang member who seeks Harry's help in getting out so he can live a better life. He expresses to her his desire to go to college. After he is seriously beaten for leaving the gang, Lewis expresses his gratitude to Harry, saying he owes her his life and that it was because of her he is still alive. He is shot in a drive-by shooting while helping Adam on a case and is in need of a liver transplant. His former gang leader Lil D becomes the donor, and he survives the procedure.
- Camryn Manheim as Kim Mendelsohn: A district attorney who used to date Tommy. Usually shows a desire to do the right thing, but always remains on course with the law and refuses to back down.
- Tracie Thoms as Katherine Kepler, an ADA with whom Adam tried to bargain at various times throughout the first season.
- Alfred Molina as Eric Sanders: A murder defendant accused of his wife's murder, whom Harry represents. The evidence against him is overwhelming, but Harry believes he is innocent. His case is later thrown out due to prosecutorial misconduct and it is later revealed that his adult daughter was the true murderer.
- Daisy Betts as Bethany Sanders, daughter of Eric Sanders. Only one of his children to testify for him. Revealed by Harry that Bethany was the one who murdered her mother.
- Jean Smart as Roseanna Remmick: A District Attorney Harry goes against during the Sanders and Peyton trials. She is known for playing dirty and being ruthless in court, which led to a judge dismissing the Sanders case and recommending her for disbarment, which she managed to avoid. She reveals that she had previously worked with both Oliver and Cassie. Won Trial Lawyer of the Year award, beating out many others including Tommy, because she nominated herself (which was against the rules) and intimidated the other board members so they would not disqualify her. Shows a lighter side during season 2, culminating in her telling Harry she's there for her to talk to after her first husband died, and showing up at the graveside with the rest of Harry's team.
- Matt Servitto as Judge Lucas Kirkland: A headstrong judge who deals with many of Harry's cases. He does not appreciate Harry's various courtroom antics.
- Christian Clemenson as Sam Berman, a lawyer from Harry's old firm, whom she butts heads with. Accidentally shot himself in the head with a nail gun in "After the Lovin'", to which Harry uses his state to settle for $3 million. He later sues Harry's firm for this.
- Frank Renzulli as "sleazy" Vinnie Delgato, a private detective, used by Harry for information regarding many of her cases, most notably the Sanders trial.
- Emily Maya Mills as Chloe Higgins, a client of Cassie, and later Harry in two episodes in the second season. Wanted protection from her ex-husband, whom she feared. Rigged a shot gun to shoot her gun her husband, but it was loaded by her nine-year-old daughter. Went against Harry and lied on the stand to protect her daughter. Eventually came around and she won the case.
- Matt Cook as ADA Cuickshank, known as "Choir Boy" to many lawyers because he always follows every law and regulation. Adam blackmails him by revealing his history with prostitution.
- Melinda McGraw as Amanda, Tommy's girlfriend who once sued him for dating her, while dating another woman. She is very protective of Tommy.
- Nancy Grace as herself, the host of a news program that is constantly disgusted by Harry's actions.
- Derek Webster as Judge Avery Beckland, another judge with whom Harry deals.

== Production ==
=== Development ===
This is the first television series that Kelley has not co-produced with 20th Century Fox Television—instead, the series is co-produced with Warner Bros. Television. On May 14, 2010, NBC officially announced that it was picking up the series. Harry's Law was held as a midseason replacement and premiered in January 2011 replacing the now-cancelled Chase.

In an attempt to make the show more realistic, producers decided to explore Cincinnati more thoroughly in the second season and included an actual Cincinnati business, Arnold's Bar and Grill, as a part of the show.

=== Cancellation and campaign efforts ===
Following the cancellation of the series, supporters banded together on Facebook in an effort to bring Harry's Law back to television. The unsuccessful campaign was launched on May 13, 2012, titled "Save Harry's Law".

== Reception ==
=== Critical response ===
==== Season 1 ====
On Rotten Tomatoes, the first season holds an approval rating of 43% based on 14 critic reviews. The site's consensus reads: "Harry's Law's twists are easy to predict, with an obvious desperation to be adorable". Metacritic assigns the first season a weighted average score of 48 out of 100, based on 21 reviews, indicating "mixed or average reviews".

Ed Bark praised the cast, saying the show "embraces its rundown neighborhood's diversity, with people of color mostly portrayed as decent-minded victims of circumstances". Bark also compliments Bates acting, saying she "has long proven her worth as an actress who knows how to throw her weight around and doesn't mind having it double as a plot point". Tim Goodman of The Hollywood Reporter was more critical of the show, noting that "Harry’s Law is, first and foremost, a colossal waste of Bates’ talent" and "is littered with bogus courtroom rambling on soap boxes so tall they are an insurance claim waiting to happen".

Common Sense Media rated the show 3 out of 5 stars. Paul Asay of Plugged In notes the show "sometimes has difficulty walking the line between examining societal problems with a smile and turning them into a farce," while also saying it "can either feel remarkably clean or disturbingly salacious, depending on what plot points are in play".

==== Season 2 ====
TV Fanatic praises the renewed personality of the cast, saying "it restored my faith and enjoyment in Harry’s Law".

=== Ratings ===
The first episode opened with 11.07 million viewers and a second-place 2.2 rating/6 share among adults 18–49 at 10 p.m., building from the second episode of The Cape (viewers: #3, 6.19 million; A18–49: #3t, 1.8/ 4 at 9 p.m.) by 4.85 million viewers and 17 percent in the demo.

Season	Episodes	Time slot (EST)	Original airing			Rank	Viewers (in millions)
Season	Episodes	Time slot (EST)	Season premiere	Season finale	TV season	Rank	Viewers (in millions)
1	12	Monday 10:00 PM	January 17, 2011	April 4, 2011	2011	#28	11.65
2	22	Wednesday 9:00 PM (2011–2012); Sunday 8:00 PM (2012)	September 21, 2011	May 27, 2012	2011–12	#52	8.92

== Awards ==
Year	Award	Ceremony date	Category	Recipients	Result	Refs
2011	Primetime Emmy Awards	18 September 2011	Outstanding Lead Actress in a Drama Series	Kathy Bates	Nominated	
2011	Primetime Emmy Awards	18 September 2011	Outstanding Guest Actor in a Drama Series	Paul McCrane	Won	
2012	Screen Actors Guild Awards	29 January 2012	Outstanding Performance by a Female Actor in a Drama Series	Kathy Bates	Nominated	
2012	Young Artist Awards	6 May 2012	Best Performance in a TV Series – Guest Starring Young Actor 14-17	Trevor Jackson	Won	
2012	Gracie Allen Awards	18 June 2012	Outstanding Drama	Harry's Law	Won	
2012	Primetime Emmy Awards	23 September 2012	Outstanding Lead Actress in a Drama Series	Kathy Bates	Nominated	
2012	Primetime Emmy Awards	23 September 2012	Outstanding Guest Actress in a Drama Series	Jean Smart	Nominated	
