= Irene Keng =

American actress

- Born: March 9
- Education: New York University Tisch School of the Arts
- Occupation: Actress
- Years active: 2005–present
- Height: 5 ft 4 in (163 cm)

Irene Keng (born March 9) is an American actress known for playing the role as Chunhua Lao in the legal comedy-drama television series Harry's Law and the role of Dongmei in the film Van Wilder: Freshman Year.

== Career ==
Irene Keng studied acting and graduated from New York University Tisch School of the Arts. Born in California, Irene moved back to Los Angeles after graduating, where she continued to study acting. She was soon cast in independent films and as the principal role in television commercials for clients such as McDonald's, Sony, Walmart, and HTC. In 2019, Irene played Donna in the horror film The Curse of La Llorona.

== Filmography ==
Film

Year	Title	Role	Notes
2005	Say That You Love Me...	Maria	Short film
2008	Diary of a Teenage Vampire	Actress	Short film
2009	The Guitar	Italian Vampire Victim	Short film
2009	Van Wilder: Freshman Year	Dongmei	
2019	The Curse of La Llorona	Donna	

Television

Year	Title	Role	Notes
2011–2012	Harry's Law	Chunhua Lao	18 episodes
2012	Applebaum	Samantha	TV film
2013	CSI: Crime Scene Investigation	Nora Wong	Episode: "Torch Song"
2015	Grey's Anatomy	Dr. Audrey Shaw	2 episodes
2017	The Good Doctor	Dr. Elle McLean	Episode: "Burnt Food"
2018	Broken Rings	Sharon Han	
2018	Liza on Demand	June	Episode: "Simpler Times"
