= Mike Listo =

American television director and producer

- Occupations: Television director, television producer
- Years active: 1998–present

Mike Listo is an American television director and co-executive producer. He frequently collaborates with David E. Kelley. Listo served as a producer on Ally McBeal (1997–2000), for which he won a Primetime Emmy Award for Outstanding Comedy Series in 1999. He directed and produced over 30 episodes of Boston Public and served as an executive producer on Boston Legal. Since 2017, he has been a core creative member of the medical drama The Good Doctor, serving as an executive producer and directing approximately 25 episodes.

== Selected director filmography ==
- Boston Legal (TV series)
- Monk (TV series)
- Boston Public (TV series)
- Harry's Law (TV series)
- Memphis Beat (TV series)
- 90210 (TV series)
- Mercy (TV series)
- Golden Boy (TV series)
- Monday Mornings (TV series)
- Franklin & Bash (TV series)
- The Mysteries of Laura (TV series)
- Satisfaction (TV series)
- How to Get Away with Murder (TV series)
- The Catch (TV series)
- Nashville (TV series)
- Notorious (TV series)
- Designated Survivor (TV series)
- The Good Doctor (TV series)
- Matlock (TV series)

== Executive producer ==
- Boston Legal (TV series)
- The Good Doctor (TV series)

== Co-executive producer ==
- Ally McBeal (TV series)
- Boston Public (TV series)
- Boston Legal (TV series)
- Harry's Law (TV series)

== Awards and nominations ==
Mike Listo awards and nominations
Awards and nominations
Award	Wins	Nominations
International Monitor Awards	1	1
Primetime Emmy Award	1	3
Producers Guild of America Award	0	1

Totals (Note: Certain award groups do not simply award one winner. They acknowledge several different recipients, have runners-up, and have third place. Since this is a specific recognition and is different from losing an award, runner-up mentions are considered wins in this award tally. For simplification and to avoid errors, each award in this list has been presumed to have had a prior nomination.)
- Wins: 2
- Nominations: 5

Year	Nominated work	Event	Award	Result	Ref
1998	Ally McBeal	Primetime Emmy Awards	Outstanding Comedy Series	Nominated	
1998	Ally McBeal	International Monitor Awards	Film Originated Television Series - Best Achievement	Won	
1999	Ally McBeal	Primetime Emmy Award	Outstanding Comedy Series	Won	
2006	Boston Legal	Producers Guild of America Award	Outstanding Producer of Episodic Television, Drama	Nominated	
2007	Boston Legal	Primetime Emmy Award	Outstanding Drama Series	Nominated	
