= Nate Corddry =

American actor (born 1977)

- Born: Nathan Harris Corddry; September 8, 1977 (age 49); Weymouth, Massachusetts, U.S.
- Education: Colby-Sawyer College Harvard University
- Occupation: Actor
- Years active: 2002–present
- Spouse: Jess Russell (m. 2021)
- Relatives: Rob Corddry (brother)

Nathan Harris Corddry (born September 8, 1977) is an American actor. He is best known for his roles as Adam Branch in the NBC drama series Harry's Law and for his role as Gabriel in the first two seasons of the CBS sitcom Mom. He has guest starred on series such as Law & Order: Criminal Intent, The Daily Show, United States of Tara, 30 Rock, and New Girl. He played Private First-Class Loudmouth in the HBO miniseries The Pacific and Tom Jeter in the NBC comedy-drama series Studio 60 on the Sunset Strip. From 2019 to 2022, Corddry played engineer Larry Wilson in the Apple TV+ original science fiction space drama series For All Mankind. In 2021, Corddry had a recurring role in the TV adaptation of Paper Girls playing Larry Radakowski.

== Early life and education ==
Corddry was born in Weymouth, Massachusetts, to Robin (née Sullivan) and Steven Corddry, who was a Massachusetts Port Authority official. After graduating from Weymouth High School in 1995, he went to Colby-Sawyer College, where he majored in Communications.

In 2023, Corddry graduated from Harvard Extension School with a master's degree in English.

== Career ==
On October 4, 2005, Nate joined The Daily Show as a correspondent. Nate and Rob Corddry appeared together in various pieces on the show, including a segment called "Brother vs. Brother" on February 21, 2006. In this segment they formally debated each other on the issue of Big Brother, but their debate quickly turned into immature name-calling, cheap shots by Rob, and an inevitable breaking up of the fight by Jon Stewart.

Corddry appeared on Guiding Light. In 2005, he appeared in a television commercial for Radio Shack. He has done commercial work for Coors Brewing Company, Verizon Communications, Xbox, Dunkin' Donuts, and NYCremembers.org.

In 2006, Corddry was cast in the Aaron Sorkin comedy-drama series Studio 60 on the Sunset Strip alongside Matthew Perry and Amanda Peet, which began airing in September 2006 and was canceled in May 2007. The show was a weekly drama set behind the scenes of a fictitious Saturday Night Live-esque television program called Studio 60 on the Sunset Strip. Corddry played a character named Tom Jeter who was a writer and performer for the show-within-a-show.

Corddry played the recurring role of Gene Stuart on the Showtime series United States of Tara. He played the Chief of Staff in the live-action film version of Yogi Bear, released 17 December 2010. He co-starred in the legal comedy-drama series Harry's Law which was canceled after its second season. Corddry voice-acted "Zed" in the Disney XD series Tron: Uprising.

In February 2014, Nate Corddry and his brother were featured alongside actor Matt L. Jones in the CollegeHumor-produced video for the Guided by Voices single "Planet Score".

In 2020, Corddry appeared as a guest on the Studio 60 on the Sunset Strip marathon fundraiser episode of The George Lucas Talk Show.

== Filmography ==
=== Film ===
| Year | Title | Role | Notes |
|---|---|---|---|
| 2006 | Arthur and the Invisibles | Seides | |
| 2006 | Suburban Girl | Jason | |
| 2007 | The Nanny Diaries | Calvin | |
| 2008 | Morning Departure | —N/a | Short film |
| 2009 | The Ugly Truth | Josh | |
| 2009 | The Invention of Lying | News Reporter | |
| 2010 | 6 Souls | Stephen Harding | |
| 2010 | Yogi Bear | Chief of Staff | |
| 2012 | Girl Most Likely | Larry Feinstein | |
| 2013 | In Lieu of Flowers | Tony | |
| 2013 | The Heat | Michael Mullins | |
| 2014 | St. Vincent | Terry | |
| 2015 | Ricked Wicky: Poor Substitute | Himself | Music Video |
| 2016 | Ghostbusters | Leif (Graffiti Artist) | |
| 2016 | You Are Not Alone | Ray | Short Film |
| 2017 | The Circle | Dan | |
| 2019 | Standing Up, Falling Down | Adam | |
| 2022 | Family Squares | Kevin | |

=== Television ===
| Year | Title | Role | Notes |
|---|---|---|---|
| 2003 | Law & Order: Criminal Intent | Ricky Gergis | Episode: "Probability" |
| 2003 | Guiding Light | Computer Nerd | Episode: "#1.14113" |
| 2005–2006 | The Daily Show | Himself (correspondent) | 9 episodes |
| 2006–2007 | Studio 60 on the Sunset Strip | Tom Jeter | 22 episodes |
| 2008 | Childrens Hospital | Dr. Jason Mantzoukas/Dr. Nate Corddry | 4 episodes |
| 2009 | United States of Tara | Gene Stuart | 10 episodes |
| 2009 | 30 Rock | Brian | Episode: "Sun Tea" |
| 2010 | The Pacific | Pvt. 'Loudmouth' | Episode: "Gloucester/Pavuvu/Banika" |
| 2010 | The Wonderful Maladys | Neil Malady | Television film |
| 2011–2012 | Harry's Law | Adam Branch | 34 episodes |
| 2012 | Childrens Hospital | Prosecuting Attorney | Episode: "Childrens Lawspital" |
| 2012–2013 | Tron: Uprising | Zed | 14 episodes |
| 2013 | New Girl | Edgar | Episode: "Pepperwood" |
| 2013–2015 | Mom | Gabriel | 22 episodes |
| 2015 | Difficult People | Brian Walsh | Episode: "Devil's Three-Way" |
| 2016 | Comedy Bang! Bang! | Lancelot | Episode: "Aubrey Plaza Wears a Velvet Off-the-Shoulder Gown with Flowers in Her Hair" |
| 2017 | The Marvelous Mrs. Maisel | Randall | Episode: "Mrs. X at the Gaslight" |
| 2019 | Fosse/Verdon | Neil Simon | Miniseries |
| 2019 | Mindhunter | Art Spencer | 4 episodes |
| 2019–2022 | For All Mankind | Larry Wilson | 17 episodes |
| 2020 | Perry Mason | Matthew Dodson | Miniseries |
| 2020 | The George Lucas Talk Show | Himself | Episode: "Stu-D2 1138 on the Binary Sunset Sith" |
| 2022 | Paper Girls | Larry Radakowski | 6 episodes |
| 2022 | High School | David | 3 episodes |
| 2023 | Barry | Matt Iserson | Episode: "a nice meal" |
| 2024 | Sugar | David Siegel | 8 episodes |
| 2026 | The Testaments | Commander MacKenzie | |
| 2026 | It's Always Sunny in Philadelphia | Mortician | Episode: "Dennis and Dee Don't Get Rich" |
