= David E. Kelley =

American television producer, writer and attorney (born 1956)

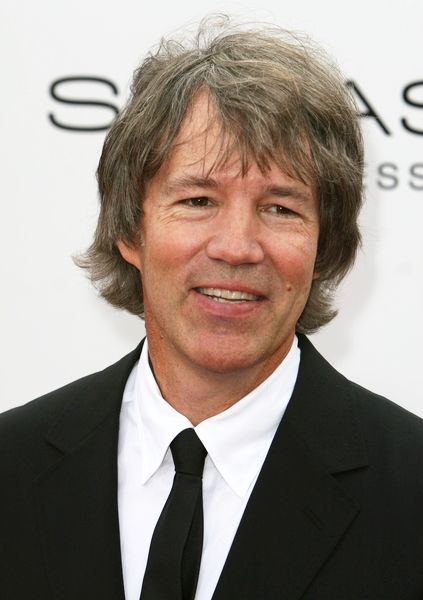
- Kelley in 2022
- Born: David Edward Kelley; April 4, 1956 (age 70); Waterville, Maine, U.S.
- Education: Princeton University (AB); Boston University (JD)
- Occupations: Television producer; writer; attorney
- Years active: 1986–present
- Spouse: Michelle Pfeiffer (m. 1993)
- Children: 2
- Parent: Jack Kelley (father)

David Edward Kelley (born April 4, 1956) is an American television writer, producer, and former attorney. He has created and/or produced a number of television series including Doogie Howser, M.D., Picket Fences, Chicago Hope, The Practice and its spin-off Boston Legal, Ally McBeal, Boston Public, Goliath, Big Little Lies, and Big Sky. Kelley is one of very few screenwriters to have created shows that have aired on all four top commercial American television networks (ABC, CBS, Fox, and NBC) as well as cable giant HBO.

== Early life ==
David Edward Kelley was born on April 4, 1956, in Waterville, Maine, raised in Belmont, Massachusetts, and attended the Belmont Hill School. His father is Jack Kelley, a member of the United States Ice Hockey Hall of Fame. Kelley was a stick boy for the New England Whalers of the World Hockey Association in their inaugural season of 1972–1973 when his father coached the team. Kelley was captain of the Princeton Tigers men's ice hockey team at Princeton University, where he graduated in 1979 with a bachelor's degree in political science.

Early on, he demonstrated a creative and quirky bent. In his junior year at Princeton, Kelley submitted a paper for a political science class about John F. Kennedy's plot to kill Fidel Castro, written as a poem. For his senior thesis, he turned the Bill of Rights into a play. "I made each amendment into a character", he said. "The First Amendment is a loudmouth guy who won't shut up. The Second Amendment guy, all he wanted to talk about was his gun collection. Then the 10th Amendment, the one where they say leave the rest for the states to decide, he was a guy with no self-esteem." Also while at Princeton, he was a member of the Princeton Triangle Club.

Kelley received his Juris Doctor (J.D.) from Boston University School of Law, where he wrote for the Legal Follies, a sketch comedy group composed of Boston University law students which still holds annual performances. He began working for a Boston law firm, mostly dealing with real estate and minor criminal cases.

In 1983, while considering it only a hobby, Kelley began writing a screenplay, a legal thriller, which was optioned in 1986 and later became the Judd Nelson feature film From the Hip in 1987.

== Television work ==
=== L.A. Law (1986–1994) ===
In 1986, Steven Bochco was searching for writers with a law background for his new NBC legal series, L.A. Law. His agent sent him Kelley's movie script for From the Hip. Enthusiastic, Bochco made him a writer and story editor for the show. During this first year, Kelley kept his law office in Boston as a hedge. However, his involvement in the show only expanded. In the second year, he became executive story editor and co-producer. Finally, in 1989, Bochco stepped away from the series, making Kelley the executive producer. While executive producer, Kelley received two Emmys for Outstanding Writing in a Dramatic Series and the show received the award for Outstanding Drama Series for both years. For the first five seasons that he was involved with the show, he wrote or co-wrote two out of three episodes. Kelley left after the fifth season in 1991 and ratings began to fall. As Newsday's TV critic wrote, "The difference between good and bad L.A. Law ... was David Kelley." Midway through the sixth season, both Bochco and Kelley were brought in as creative consultants after the show received bad press about its decline in quality.

=== Picket Fences (1992–1996) ===
In 1992, after co-creating Doogie Howser, M.D. with his mentor Steven Bochco, Kelley formed his own production company, David E. Kelley Productions, making a three-series deal with CBS. Its first creation, Picket Fences, airing in 1992 and influenced by Twin Peaks and Northern Exposure, focused on the police department in the quirky fictional town of Rome, Wisconsin. Kelley wrote most of the episodes for the first three years. The show was critically acclaimed but never found a sizable audience. Picket Fences went on for four years, receiving a total of 14 Emmy awards including consecutive Emmys for Outstanding Drama Series for its first and second seasons.

In 1995, the fourth and final season, Kelley wrote only two episodes. "We had almost 10 writers try to come in and take over for this one man", said Picket Fences actress Holly Marie Combs. "The quality was not nearly what it was."

=== Chicago Hope (1994–2000) ===
Under pressure from CBS to develop a second series even though he didn't feel ready to produce two shows simultaneously, Kelley launched the medical drama Chicago Hope, starring Mandy Patinkin and Adam Arkin, which premiered in 1994. Airing at the same time as the season's other new medical drama, NBC's ER, the ultimate ratings leader, Chicago Hope plotted "upscale medicine in a high-tech world run by high-priced doctors". During its six-year run, it won seven Emmys and generally high critical praise, but only middling ratings.

Originally intending to write only the first several episodes in order to return full-time to Picket Fences, Kelley eventually wrote most of the material for both shows, a total of roughly 40 scripts. Expressing a desire to focus more on his production company and upcoming projects, Kelley ceased day-to-day involvement with both series in 1995, allowing others to write and produce. Towards the end of the fifth season in 1999, facing cancellation, Kelley fired most of the cast members added since he had left the show, brought back Mandy Patinkin and began writing episodes again.

=== The Practice (1997–2004) ===
In 1995, Kelley entered into a five-year deal with 20th Century Fox Television to produce shows for both the ABC and FOX television networks, each agreeing to take two series. If one network passed on a project, the other got first refusal. Kelley retained full creative control. Ally McBeal on FOX and The Practice on ABC were the first two projects to come from this deal.

Premiering as a midseason replacement for the 1996–1997 season, The Practice was Kelley's chance to write another courtroom drama but one focusing on the less-glamorous realities of a small law firm. The Practice would be the first of four successful series by Kelley that were set in Boston, proximal to his hometown of Belmont, Massachusetts. Receiving critical applause (along with two Emmys for Outstanding Drama Series) but low ratings in its starting seasons, it eventually became a popular top 10 program. The New York Times described the show as "the profoundly realistic, unending battle between soul-searching and ambition". Full-time writers on the first season of The Practice included David Shore, later the creator of House, Stephen Gaghan, a future Oscar winner for Traffic, Michael R. Perry, the creator of the 2011–12 series The River, and Ed Redlich, co-creator of the 2011–12 series Unforgettable. Later the writing staff would grow to 10, most with law degrees. By the fifth season, Kelley would usually only edit the final script and was generally not on the set during filming.

In 2003, due to sagging ratings, ABC cut Kelley's budget in half for the eighth and final season. He responded by firing most of the cast and hiring James Spader for the role of Alan Shore, whom The New York Times described as "a lecherous, twisted antitrust lawyer with a breezy disregard for ethics." The final episodes of The Practice were focused on introducing the new characters from his next show, Boston Legal.

=== Ally McBeal (1997–2002) ===
When Ally McBeal premiered in 1997 on FOX, Kelley was also shepherding his other two shows, Chicago Hope and The Practice, although he was not actively participating in Chicago Hope at the time. The title character Ally is a young, attractive, impulsive, Harvard-educated lawyer described by a New York Times journalist as "stylish, sexy, smart, opinionated, and an emotional wreck." In contrast to The Practice and its idealistic lawyers, the law firm in Ally McBeal was founded only to make money.

The New York Times felt that the show uniquely emphasised "character and caricature". The show lasted five seasons, seven Emmys (one for Outstanding Comedy Series for its second season), mostly positive reviews and a barrage of criticism for its portrayal of women, with many journalists saying that the character Ally was a giant step backwards.

Parallel to The Practice, Kelley penned all the scripts for the first season, then brought in other writers in subsequent years, although he continued to write many episodes himself.

==== Portrayal of the Ally McBeal character ====
When the program Ally McBeal first ran, many women lauded its portrayal of the lead character. Sharon Waxman, writing for The Washington Post, commented that Kelley had a keen insight into the human nature of both men and women. She quoted Dyan Cannon: "This man understands the way a woman thinks, ... the complex ways we've found to hide our fears." A New York Times writer used the character as an example of a strong television woman's role, another saw herself, at times, in the character's portrayal of self-absorption and reflection, her crafted neuroses, her vulnerabilities.

Later, however, much press coverage was spent on the controversial nature of women in Ally McBeal. Time featured a cover story about the decline of feminism with a picture of Ally (among a pantheon of feminist heroines) on the cover. In the article, Ginia Bellafante used the McBeal character as a modern exemplar proving that "[M]uch of feminism has devolved into the silly." In response, author Erica Jong felt that the Time journalist diminished her argument by using only pop-cultural references and ignoring the majority of real-world women who have made significant progress.

Writing in Salon.com, Joyce Millman disputed that Ally McBeal should even be described as a "women's show"—that its representations of women were, in fact, a male fantasy. She felt that Kelley treated his female characters "sadistically" in general, beginning all the way back to L.A. Law, saving only The Practice for positive remarks.

Kelley's Ally McBeal was hugely successful in attracting the 18-to-34-year-old women audience demographic. The New York Times columnist, Maureen Dowd, quoted two young, professional women saying they liked shows with female characters like themselves, single, even obsessed. Dowd quoted the executive producer of Law & Order, Dick Wolf, "I think there is a wish-fulfillment factor when you put an attractive woman in a situation where she is doing real, adult stuff."

=== Boston Public (2000–2004) ===
In 2000, 20th Century Fox Television extended its arrangement with Kelley. The deal, which ran for six years, reportedly made Kelley the highest-paid producer in TV history—up to $40 million a year—in return for a first-look at his projects.

Premiering on FOX in 2000, Boston Public, which follows the lives of teachers and administrators at a Boston inner-city high school, joined The Practice and Ally McBeal for the season, meaning Kelley was responsible for writing or overseeing 67 episodes.

The program was initially considered a modest hit but received less than glowing reviews. The previous season, Kelley stumbled with both the short-lived Snoops, his first attempt at delegating most of the responsibilities to others, and with Ally, the experiment with 30-minute shortened episodes of Ally McBeal. The TV critic from the Fort Worth Star-Telegram opined that these failures and the weaknesses he saw in Boston Public were a sign that Kelley had lost the Midas touch. The show lasted four seasons, garnering one minor Emmy.

=== Boston Legal (2004–2008) ===
In addition to Snoops, Kelley continued to have a string of unsuccessful series: Girls Club in 2002, The Brotherhood of Poland, New Hampshire in 2003 and the reality show The Law Firm in 2005. All the while, he continued overseeing Boston Public and The Practice.

Boston Legal on ABC, premiering in 2004, gave continuity and success to the Kelley franchise. It was a spin-off of his long-running legal drama The Practice, and followed attorney Alan Shore (a character who became the star of The Practice in its final season, played by James Spader) to his new law firm, Crane, Poole & Schmidt. It also starred veteran television actors Candice Bergen and William Shatner. Critically popular with less than spectacular ratings (ranked 27th for the first season, 46th for the second), the show was an "Emmy darling" during its run, winning seven times and being nominated over 25 times. The show won the Peabody Award in 2005 for its signature political commentaries.

In 2007, Boston Legal began to see a rise of viewership as a result of its following ABC's popular Dancing with the Stars series, mostly ranking either first or second most-watched program of the evening in its ten o'clock time period, beating out CBS and NBC's shows.

The fifth and final season began in 2008 with Kelley writing most of the episodes. The season only aired thirteen episodes, making a series run of 101 episodes. The two-hour series finale drew 11 million viewers. Still, the show drew over 15 million viewers much of its first season—and Kelley felt ABC's treatment of the show over the years ultimately killed it, saying to TV Guide that ABC always treated the show like its "bastard child". Boston Legal aired on four different nights (Sunday, Tuesday, Wednesday and Monday) in its five-season run, with the ratings slipping after each move. In the second-to-last episode of the series, Kelley blatantly wrote a show questioning the legitimacy of the Nielsen ratings and the network's treatment of the show by including a plot about a lawsuit against an unnamed television network.

In 2007, Kelley received the Justice in the Arts Award from Death Penalty Focus, an organization dedicated to the abolition of the death penalty. He previously received an award from this organization in 2000 for his work on the show The Practice.

=== 2007–2022 ===
Kelley's The Wedding Bells premiered in the autumn of 2007 and was canceled after seven episodes. Additionally, Kelley worked on an Americanized version of the BBC show Life on Mars for the 2007–2008 season on ABC and also worked on an adaptation of Joseph Wambaugh's Hollywood Station. He later handed production to another creative crew.

In May 2008, Kelley signed a deal with Warner Bros. Television and later penned a spec script for another legal drama entitled Legally Mad in a comic vein. NBC ultimately rejected the series. NBC would pay a two million dollar penalty to Warner Bros. for Kelley's scripts. Kelley was the creator and executive producer of Harry's Law, which premiered on NBC on January 17, 2011. The series starred Kathy Bates in the titular role. The show was cancelled in 2012 even though it was the network's second most-watched drama, because its audience skewed too old as the more desirable 18–49 demographic viewership was very low.

In 2011, Kelley wrote a script for the pilot episode of a new Wonder Woman TV series for Warner Bros. Television, but the pilot was rejected by NBC for its fall 2011 lineup.

A new medical series, Monday Mornings, co-created with Sanjay Gupta, premiered February 2013 on TNT, the cable television channel owned by Time Warner. Set in Portland, Oregon, the show stars Ving Rhames, Alfred Molina and Jamie Bamber. In May 2013, the show was canceled by TNT.

A new comedy series created by Kelley, The Crazy Ones, starring Robin Williams and Sarah Michelle Gellar, premiered on CBS on September 26, 2013. The show was cancelled after a season due to lukewarm reception.

In 2015, Kelley created the Amazon Studios series Goliath.

In 2017, Kelley spearheaded a new HBO series, Big Little Lies, which won the Primetime Emmy Award for Outstanding Limited Series. He was also a showrunner on the TV adaptation of the Stephen King novel Mr. Mercedes.

In March 2018, it was announced that HBO had given a series order for The Undoing, a miniseries based on the 2014 novel You Should Have Known by Jean Hanff Korelitz. The series was written by Kelley, who also served as executive producer with Nicole Kidman (who starred alongside Hugh Grant and Donald Sutherland), Per Saari, and Bruna Papandrea. Susanne Bier directed the miniseries. It premiered in October 2020, and was the most-watched show on HBO that year.

In June 2019, Kelley wrote a script for a CBS crime drama series, The Lincoln Lawyer, based from the 2005 novel of the same name by Michael Connelly. On May 2, 2020, CBS announced that the pilot would not be moving forward. However, on January 11, 2021, the series was picked up by Netflix.

Kelley was announced as the writer and showrunner on the ABC crime drama series Big Sky, based on the book The Highway by C. J. Box.

Kelley served as writer, executive producer and showrunner on The Calling, an American adaptation of Israeli television series Missing File on Peacock.

=== 2023–present ===
In November 2024, Kelley received the 2024 International Emmy Founders Award at the 52nd International Emmy Awards Gala, recognizing his four-decade career creating acclaimed television series such as L.A. Law, Ally McBeal, and Big Little Lies. The International Academy praised Kelley's lasting impact on global television, while Kelley credited the honor to the collaborators who helped him create influential, award-winning shows and continue producing successful projects across major streaming platforms.

In 2026, Kelley created and executive produced Margo's Got Money Troubles with A24 as the studio.

In April 2026, Kelley is teaming up with director Matt Reeves for a series based on Tom Wolfe's The Bonfire of the Vanities. The project is in development at Apple TV, with Warner Bros. TV as the studio.

In May 2026, Kelley will adapt a Michael Connelly crime novel, the 2024 bestseller Nightshade, for television, with HBO Max.

In the same month, it was announced that Myron Bolitar had been ordered by Netflix, with Kelley and Kyle Long serving as showrunners. The series is based on Myron Bolitar book series by Harlan Coben.

== Methods ==
=== Writing ===
Kelley writes his first drafts longhand using a Bic ballpoint and yellow legal pad. He typically writes scripts in two to four days, initially working without collaboration, finding it faster and easier than trying to explain what he wants to others.

Kelley has been criticised for not delegating. A Picket Fences writer described his time on the show as "the most boring period of my life—you'd write a scene... [and Kelley would] rewrite it completely. Or he just cut you out completely—you learned nothing. Having a writing staff was a needless expense for the network." Kelley gradually became more comfortable bringing in writers for ideas and taking over writing responsibilities. Kelley described this as a natural evolution:

There's a period at the beginning of a series [when] you're doing most of the writing and then you go through another period where you have the ideas and you're assigning those stories and ideas to other people and hopefully they execute them. Then if you're lucky you get a staff where they come into the room with their own ideas and specific takes on how to execute them and they do.

=== Story elements ===
Kelley structures his episodes with multiple storylines. An episode may include a self-contained subplot plus other story arcs that either began in a previous episode or will continue subsequently—some will continue the entire season. The viewer is thereby rarely sure whether what appears as a simple incident will blossom into a major plot point.

Kelley seeds his plots with political and social "hot-button" issues. One method is by introducing provocative legal cases. Episodes have covered the gamut of contemporary issues from the culpability of tobacco companies and gun makers to assisted-suicide crusaders. Another way is by undergirding the character's social interrelationships with serious explorations such as feminism, sexuality and divorce. Instead of lessons, Kelley strives to "raise moral and ethical questions without easy answers." He avoids a didactic narrative by not losing sight of the audience's desire to be entertained. He states:

You've got to honor your relationship with your audience—that they sit down because they want to be entertained. And that doesn't mean you can't provoke them and antagonize them and challenge them in the course of the entertainment as long as you keep the entertainment part of the equation alive.

Instead of taking clear stands on issues, Kelley creates scenarios meant to challenge audience preconceptions. For example, an episode of Ally McBeal dealt with a female employee who sued for sexual harassment because she noticed that other prettier women were being promoted. There was deliberately no clear point of view.

Kelley uses humor and the surreal and mixes tragedy with farce. He describes his strategy as follows:

Often we try to seduce the audience at the beginning that this is going to be fun, a romp or a ride, and then once the ride has begun, to reveal some serious subject matter for them to think about.

In Ally McBeal, Kelley used two techniques: a voiceover providing an interior monologue for the title character, and Walter Mitty fantasy sequences (which critics noted as similar to Dream On) giving a humorous and often deeply honest (but sometimes ironic) explanation of the character's inner thoughts.

=== Crossover episodes ===
Kelley frequently crossed the cast of different shows. One crossover program event (which crossed networks also) involved characters from Kelley's Ally McBeal on the Fox network appearing on his ABC show, The Practice, and, in turn, The Practice characters appeared on Ally McBeal. This was done in spite of the two shows' different tones (one a comedy, the other a drama). This crossover was partially credited for raising ratings for The Practice, which it sustained after those episodes.

Kelley repeated this maneuver with his Boston Public, Ally McBeal, and Boston Legal shows. Thereafter, many other crossovers occurred including shows not created by Kelley.

Kelley's most elaborate crossover was only partially successful. He sought to crossover an episode of his Picket Fences with Chris Carter's The X-Files. Both shows aired Friday nights, but on different networks. The intent was to begin the story on one show, then hope viewers would switch channels to watch the conclusion on another network. CBS balked, and both scripts were rewritten, with The X-Files' Fox Mulder no longer set to appear on Picket Fences. Yet, both episodes deal with Wisconsin and cows, with Fences referencing an FBI investigation in a neighboring town. CBS blurred the connection further by postponing the Fences episode by one week.

=== Casting ===
Kelley often uses regular actors from older shows in newer shows. For example, Anthony Heald and René Auberjonois both played judges on The Practice, and both went on to be regular cast members in later shows (Heald on Boston Public as a vice-principal and Auberjonois on Boston Legal as a partner at a law firm). Both Kathy Baker and Justin Shenkarow (Picket Fences) have been used in Boston Public. Kathy Baker as Meredith "The Hook Lady" Peters and Justin Shenkarow as the student Warren Dickson. In addition many actors who either had the main roles or major roles in Kelley's previous shows would make at least one guest appearance in Boston Legal.

After the HBO series Big Little Lies, Kelley started a working relationship with Academy Award-winning actress Nicole Kidman. The pair have collaborated on several shows together, including Big Little Lies, The Undoing and Nine Perfect Strangers.

== Portrayal of real life ==
=== Legal profession ===
The Practice was considered more accurate in its portrayal of the law than L.A. Law or Ally McBeal. The importance of legal strategy, sometimes at the expense of the truth, rang true. One attorney said, "[I]t's really about the tactics and the mistakes that opposing counsel makes." Judges were represented as complex, less-than-perfect human beings, sometimes with emotional problems. Plots demonstrated how a defendant's personality would impact the adjudication of a case. Stuart Levine of Variety magazine said, "[The Practice] isn't afraid to paint the firm's clients as the dregs of society." Kelley said,

One of the most fundamental questions people have about defense attorneys is, 'How can you do that? How can you go to bat every day for a person whom you may not know is guilty but you have a pretty good idea that he's not so innocent?

Other aspects of the legal profession in Kelley's shows have been criticized as unrealistic. Attorneys have complained that:

- Ex parte meetings (where lawyers meet in a judge's chambers without opposing counsel present) do not happen.
- Judges would not allow attorneys to badger or attack witnesses.
- Shows overplayed prosecutorial and law enforcement misconduct.
- Time required to select and empanel a jury is not shown or in the story's timeline.
- Many of the cases would never have made it to trial.

=== Public education ===
Samuel G. Freedman, a professor of journalism at Columbia University, writing in The New York Times, praises Kelley's series Boston Public as an attempt to both reflect and change public opinion about public education, particularly the urban, overcrowded, underfinanced variety. He liked the realism of the setting, the mixed ethnicity of the faculty and (oftentimes antipathetic) student body and the bureaucratic struggles. He criticized Kelley, though, for pandering to stereotypes of teachers and students and for failing to show successful teaching strategies.

=== Medicine ===
In The New York Times, Arthur Caplan, professor of bioethics at the University of Pennsylvania, felt that medical dramas such as Kelley's Chicago Hope do a good job of addressing bioethical issues such as who should receive a liver transplant or when should a patient be allowed to die. However, there is a lack of discussion concerning the primary money issue: "How do people pay for this?" The show has been criticized for presenting a one-sided view of managed care, portraying HMOs as dramatically evil while glossing over the complexities. Doctors are too often shown as selfless patient advocates ready to battle whatever the financial cost.

=== Catholicism ===
Kelley has incorporated religious subject matter from the beginning, including issues involving Protestantism, Judaism, Scientology and Catholicism among others. With the widespread media coverage of child sexual abuse cases in the Roman Catholic Church during the mid-to-late 1990s, Kelley began to introduce this controversy into his scripts. For instance, the character Bobby Donnell on The Practice, a Catholic, became personally estranged from the Church over the issue of sexually abusive priests. While the Catholic League did not object to this episode, they frequently complained of anti-Catholic bias in Kelley's shows because of his references to this subject.

== Feature films ==
Besides his first film, From the Hip, which received poor reviews, Kelley wrote and produced three other films. 1996's To Gillian on Her 37th Birthday, a romance, co-starring his wife, Michelle Pfeiffer, received tepid critical and box office reception. In 1999, came two films: Lake Placid, a combination of suspense, horror and comedy, and Mystery, Alaska, about a fictional small-town ice hockey team that plays a game against the New York Rangers of the National Hockey League

== Personal life ==
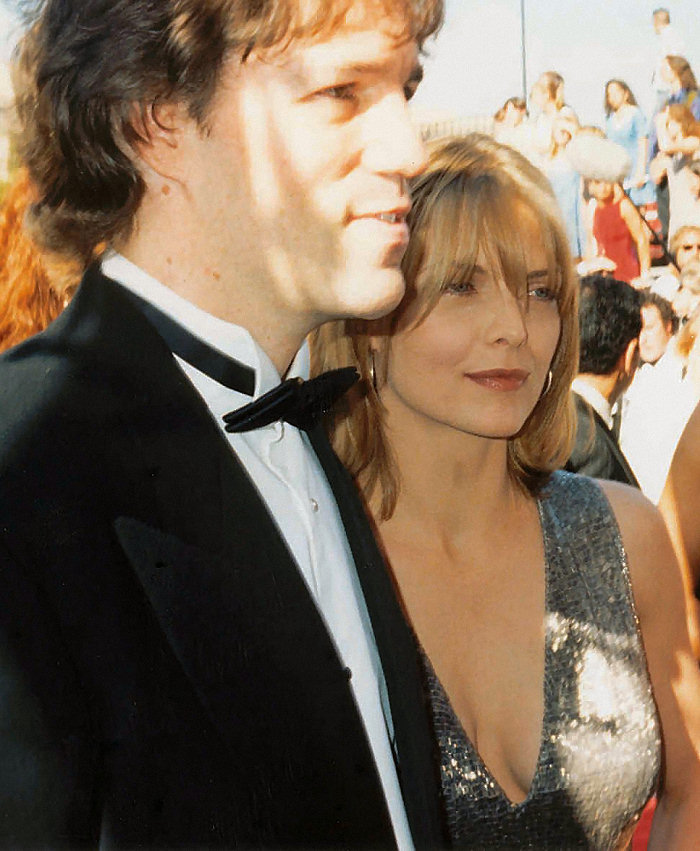
Kelley with wife Michelle Pfeiffer at the 46th Primetime Emmy Awards in 1994

His programs have addressed Catholic issues. Kelley was raised a Protestant.

In January 1993, Kelley was set up on a blind date with actress Michelle Pfeiffer. He took her to see Bram Stoker's Dracula the following week and they began dating seriously.

Pfeiffer had entered into private adoption proceedings before she met Kelley. In March 1993, she adopted a newborn daughter Claudia Rose. They married on November 13, 1993, and christened Claudia the same day. In August 1994, Pfeiffer gave birth to a son, John Henry.

David's brother, Mark Kelley, is the former Director of Amateur Scouting for the Chicago Blackhawks.

David was drafted in the tenth round of the WHA World Hockey Association draft by the Cincinnati Stingers in 1977.

== Filmography ==
=== Film ===
Year	Title	Writer	Producer
1987	From the Hip	Yes	No
1996	To Gillian on Her 37th Birthday	Yes	Yes
1999	Mystery, Alaska	Yes	Yes
1999	Lake Placid	Yes	Yes

=== Television ===
Year	Title	Network	Creator	Writer	Executive Producer	Showrunner	Notes
1986–1992	L.A. Law	NBC	No	Yes	Yes	No	Also story editor, executive story editor, supervising producer, co-producer and creative consultant
1989–1993	Doogie Howser, M.D.	ABC	Yes	Yes	No	No	Co-creator with Steven Bochco
1992–1996	Picket Fences	CBS	Yes	Yes	Yes	Yes	
1994–2000	Chicago Hope	CBS	Yes	Yes	Yes	Yes	Also executive consultant
1996–2004	The Practice	ABC	Yes	Yes	Yes	Yes	
1997–2002	Ally McBeal	Fox	Yes	Yes	Yes	Yes	
1999	Snoops	ABC	Yes	Yes	Yes	Yes	
2000–2004	Boston Public	Fox	Yes	Yes	Yes	Yes	Also executive consultant
2002	Girls Club	Fox	Yes	Yes	Yes	Yes	
2003	The Brotherhood of Poland, New Hampshire	CBS	Yes	Yes	Yes	Yes	
2004–2008	Boston Legal	ABC	Yes	Yes	Yes	Yes	
2005	The Law Firm	NBC	Yes	Yes	Yes	Yes	
2007	The Wedding Bells	Fox	Yes	Yes	Yes	Yes	
2011–2012	Harry's Law	NBC	Yes	Yes	Yes	Yes	
2013	Monday Mornings	TNT	Yes	Yes	Yes	Yes	
2013–2014	The Crazy Ones	CBS	Yes	Yes	Yes	Yes	
2016–2021	Goliath	Amazon Prime Video	Yes	Yes	Yes	Yes	Exited after season 1
2017–2019	Big Little Lies	HBO	Yes	Yes	Yes	Yes	
2017–2019	Mr. Mercedes	Audience	Yes	Yes	Yes	Yes	
2020–2023	Big Sky	ABC	Yes	Yes	Yes	Yes	
2021–2022	Big Shot	Disney+	Yes	Yes	Yes	No	
2021–present	Nine Perfect Strangers	Hulu	Yes	Yes	Yes	Yes	
2022–present	The Lincoln Lawyer	Netflix	Yes	Yes	Yes	No	
2022	The Calling	Peacock	Yes	Yes	Yes	Yes	
2024–present	Presumed Innocent	Apple TV+	Yes	Yes	Yes	Yes	
2026–present	Margo's Got Money Troubles	Apple TV+	Yes	Yes	Yes	Yes	
TBA	Myron Bolitar	Netflix	Yes	Yes	Yes	Yes	

Miniseries

Year	Title	Network	Creator	Writer	Executive Producer	Showrunner	Ref.
2020	The Undoing	HBO	Yes	Yes	Yes	Yes	
2022	Anatomy of a Scandal	Netflix	Yes	Yes	Yes	Yes	
2023	Love & Death	HBO Max/Max	Yes	Yes	Yes	Yes	
2024	A Man in Full	Netflix	Yes	Yes	Yes	Yes	

=== Timeline ===
Note: The above timeline does not include the three additional episodes of Snoops and the final two episodes of Boston Public broadcast in non-U.S. markets nor the short-lived Ally.

== Awards ==
=== Emmy awards and nominations ===
Year	For	Category	Result	Other notes
1988	Outstanding Drama Series	L.A. Law	Nominated	Shared with Steven Bochco, Terry Louise Fisher, Phillip M. Goldfarb, Scott Goldstein, Gregory Hoblit, Rick Wallace
1988	Outstanding Writing for a Drama Series	L.A. Law	Nominated	Shared with Terry Louise Fisher
1988	Outstanding Writing for a Drama Series	L.A. Law	Nominated	Shared with Terry Louise Fisher
1989	Outstanding Drama Series	L.A. Law	Won	Shared with Steven Bochco, William M. Finkelstein, Michele Gallery, Phillip M. Goldfarb, Scott Goldstein, Judith Parker, Rick Wallace, Alice West
1989	Outstanding Writing for a Drama Series	L.A. Law	Nominated	
1989	Outstanding Writing for a Drama Series	L.A. Law	Nominated	
1989	Outstanding Writing for a Drama Series	L.A. Law	Nominated	
1990	Outstanding Drama Series	L.A. Law	Won	Shared with Robert M. Breech, William M. Finkelstein, Elodie Keene, Michael M. Robin, Rick Wallace, Alice West
1990	Outstanding Writing for a Drama Series	L.A. Law	Won	For the episode "Blood, Sweat & Fears"
1990	Outstanding Writing for a Drama Series	L.A. Law	Nominated	For the episode "Bang...Zoom...Zap". Shared with co-writer William M. Finklestein
1991	Outstanding Drama Series	L.A. Law	Won	Shared with Rick Wallace, Patricia Green, John Hill, Robert Breech, James C. Hart, Elodie Keene, Alan Brennert, Alice West
1991	Outstanding Writing for a Drama Series	L.A. Law	Won	For the episode "On The Toad Again"
1991	Outstanding Writing for a Drama Series	L.A. Law	Nominated	For the episode "Mutinies On The Banzai". Shared with co-writers Alan Brennert and Patricia Green.
1993	Outstanding Drama Series	Picket Fences	Won	Shared with Robert Breech, Mark B. Perry, Jonathan Pontell, Michael Pressman, Alice West
1994	Outstanding Drama Series	Picket Fences	Won	Shared with Robert Breech, Ann Donahue, Geoffrey Neigher, Jack Philbrick, Jonathan Pontell, Michael Pressman, Alice West
1995	Outstanding Drama Series	Chicago Hope	Nominated	Shared with Michael Braverman, Dennis Cooper, Rob Corn, Michael Dinner, James C. Hart, John Heath, Michael Pressman, John Tinker
1996	Outstanding Drama Series	Chicago Hope	Nominated	Shared with Kevin Arkadie, Rob Corn, Bill D'Elia, Michael Dinner, Patricia Green, James C. Hart, John Heath, John Tinker
1998	Outstanding Drama Series	The Practice	Won	Shared with Bob Breech, Jeffrey Kramer, Christina Musrey, Jonathan Pontell, Ed Redlich, Gary M. Strangis, Pamela Wisne
1998	Outstanding Comedy Series	Ally McBeal	Nominated	Shared with Jeffrey Kramer, Mike Listo, Jonathan Pontell, Steve Robin, Pamela Wisne
1998	Outstanding Writing for a Comedy Series	Ally McBeal	Nominated	For the episode "Theme of Life"
1998	Outstanding Writing for a Drama Series	The Practice	Nominated	For the episode "Betrayal"
1999	Outstanding Drama Series	The Practice	Won	Shared with Bob Breech, Jeffrey Kramer, Christina Musrey, Gary M. Strangis, Pamela Wisne
1999	Outstanding Comedy Series	Ally McBeal	Won	Shared with Peter Burrell, Jeffrey Kramer, Mike Listo, Jonathan Pontell, Steve Robin, Pamela Wisne
1999	Outstanding Writing for a Comedy Series	Ally McBeal	Nominated	For the episode "Sideshow"
2000	Outstanding Drama Series	The Practice	Nominated	Shared with Bob Breech, Jeffrey Kramer, Christina Musrey, Gary M. Strangis, Pamela Wisne
2001	Outstanding Drama Series	The Practice	Nominated	
2007	Outstanding Drama Series	Boston Legal	Nominated	
2008	Outstanding Drama Series	Boston Legal	Nominated	
2017	Outstanding Limited Series	Big Little Lies	Won	
2017	Outstanding Writing for a Limited Series, Movie, or Dramatic Special	Big Little Lies	Nominated	
2024	International Emmy Founders Award		Won	

==== Notes ====
1. Information from the Academy of Television Arts & Sciences online database
2. In 1999, he was the first producer ever to take home Emmys for both Best Comedy Series (Ally McBeal) and Best Drama (The Practice).

==== Emmy winning actors and actresses in Kelley's series ====
Among the actors and actresses who have won Emmys for playing roles in Kelley's series are Peter MacNicol, Tracey Ullman, Sharon Stone, William Shatner, James Spader, Alfre Woodard, Charles S. Dutton, Michael Emerson, James Whitmore, Beah Richards, Edward Herrmann, Michael Badalucco, Holland Taylor, John Larroquette, Camryn Manheim, Christine Lahti, Héctor Elizondo, Mandy Patinkin, Kathy Baker, Ray Walston, Paul Winfield, Richard Kiley, Fyvush Finkel, Leigh Taylor-Young, Tom Skerritt, Richard Dysart, Paul McCrane, Christian Clemenson, Jimmy Smits, Larry Drake, Nicole Kidman, Alexander Skarsgård, and Laura Dern.

=== Peabody awards ===
The following information is from the Peabody Awards database.

Year	For	Producing organizations
1998	The Practice	ABC and David E. Kelley Productions
1998	Ally McBeal	Fox and David E. Kelley Productions
2002	Boston Public	David E. Kelley Productions in association with 20th Century Fox Television
2005	Boston Legal	David E. Kelley Productions in association with 20th Century Fox Television

=== Television Hall of Fame ===
In 2014, David E. Kelley was inducted into the Television Hall of Fame.

== Bibliography ==
- Caldwell, John: "Convergence Television: Aggregating Form and Repurposing Content in the Culture of Conglomeration". Television after TV: Essays on a Medium in Transition. Ed. Lynn Spigel and Jan Olsson. Duke University Press, 2004 ISBN 978-0-8223-3393-7.
- Caves, Richard E.: Switching Channels: Organization and Change in TV Broadcasting. Harvard University Press, 2005. ISBN 978-0-674-01878-5.
- Ellis, John: Seeing Things: Television in the Age of Uncertainty. I. B. Tauris, 2000 ISBN 978-1-86064-125-1.
- Levine, Josh: David E. Kelley: The Man Behind Ally McBeal. ECW Press, 1999 ISBN 978-1-55022-372-9.
- Orlik, Peter B.: Electronic Media Criticism: Applied Perspectives. LEA, Inc., 2000 ISBN 978-0-8058-3641-7.
- Tucker, Ken: Kissing Bill O'Reilly, Roasting Miss Piggy: 100 Things to Love and Hate About TV. St. Martin's Press, 2005 ISBN 978-0-312-33057-6.
