= Jonathan Pontell =

Television director, producer and editor

Jonathan Pontell is a television director, producer and editor.

A native of New York City, Pontell attended the School of Visual Arts, studying film and television. After graduation, he worked as a film editor on features such as The Exorcist and long-form documentaries for both CBS News and public television.

In 1981 Pontell relocated to Los Angeles and edited episodic television series including Hill Street Blues, Hooperman, Northern Exposure, and Moonlighting. Working on L.A. Law, he began a 19-year association with David E. Kelley. Pontell served as director and producer on Picket Fences and The Practice. From 1997 to 2000, he also directed multiple episodes of Ally McBeal. Pontell produced and directed for David E. Kelley on Boston Public from 2000 to 2004. He was an executive producer of Kelley's first reality program, The Law Firm. He was also the director and executive producer for the ABC series What About Brian?

Pontell has received multiple awards, including four Emmy Awards, two Golden Globes and two George Foster Peabody Awards.

== Credits ==
=== Director ===
- Picket Fences (TV series)
- The Practice (TV series)
- Ally McBeal (TV series)
- Boston Public (TV series)
- Bones (TV series)
- What About Brian (TV series)

=== Producer ===
- L.A. Law (TV series)
- Picket Fences (TV series)
- The Practice (TV series)
- Ally McBeal (TV series)
- Ally (TV series)
- Boston Public (TV series)
- The Law Firm (TV series)
- Bones (TV series)
- What About Brian (TV series)
- The Wedding Bells (TV series)

Legally Mad (TV pilot)

=== Editor ===
- Hill Street Blues (TV series)
- Beverly Hills Buntz (TV series)
- Hooperman (TV series)
- Northern Exposure (TV series)
- L.A. Law (TV series)
- Picket Fences (TV series)
- Ally McBeal (TV series)
