= Paul McCrane =

American actor and director

- Born: January 19, 1961 (age 65); Philadelphia, Pennsylvania, US
- Occupations: Actor; singer; director
- Years active: 1979–present
- Spouses: Dana Kellin (1998)
- Children: 2

Paul McCrane (born January 19, 1961) is an American actor, singer and director. He is known for his portrayal of Montgomery MacNeil in the film Fame (1980), Frank Berry in the film The Hotel New Hampshire (1984), Emil Antonowsky in RoboCop (1987), and Robert Romano on the NBC medical drama television series ER.

== Early life ==
McCrane was born on January 19, 1961, in Philadelphia, the son of Eileen C. (née Manyak) and James J. McCrane, Jr. His family moved to Richboro, Pennsylvania, where he lived until he moved to New York City after graduating from Holy Ghost Preparatory School in 1978. He studied theatre at HB Studio in New York City.

== Career ==
At the age of 17, McCrane acted in a short scene in Rocky II, playing a multi-fracture patient who asks for Rocky's autograph on his head cast ("Hey Rocky...sign my head!").

McCrane later portrayed Montgomery MacNeil in Fame. He was the lead vocalist on three songs in the feature film: "Dogs in the Yard", "Miles from Here" and "Is It Okay If I Call You Mine?". He also had a solo in "I Sing the Body Electric".

Later, he played Frank Berry in The Hotel New Hampshire, murderous Emil Antonowsky in RoboCop, followed by astronaut Pete Conrad in From the Earth to the Moon, Guard Trout in The Shawshank Redemption, cancer-absorbing mutant Leonard Betts in The X-Files. After a recurring role as Robert "Rocket" Romano on ER, he became a regular cast member (1997–2003) and returned for one episode during its 15th and final season (2008). McCrane guest-starred in 24 Seasons 5 and 6 as Graem Bauer. He has also appeared on Ugly Betty and CSI: Crime Scene Investigation.

In 2011, McCrane took on the recurring role of assistant district attorney Josh Peyton in the NBC television program Harry's Law, a project of producer David E. Kelley. McCrane won the 2011 Emmy Award for Guest Actor in a Drama Series for his performance in the role. In 2019, he was cast in a recurring role on the CBS TV series All Rise.

== Filmography ==
=== Film ===
| Year | Title | Role | Notes |
|---|---|---|---|
| 1979 | Rocky II | Pete | |
| 1980 | Fame | Montgomery MacNeill | Nominated — Young Artist Award for Best Leading Young Actor in a Feature Film |
| 1984 | The Hotel New Hampshire | Frank | |
| 1984 | Purple Hearts | Brenner | |
| 1987 | RoboCop | Emil Antonowsky | |
| 1988 | The Blob | Deputy Bill Briggs | |
| 1994 | The Shawshank Redemption | Guard Trout | |
| 2000 | The Last Producer | Austin Green | |
| 2012 | Atlas Shrugged II | Wesley Mouch | |
| 2017 | Take the 10 | Carey | |

=== Television ===
| Year | Title | Role | Notes |
|---|---|---|---|
| 1982 | Nurse | George Nicholas | 1 episode |
| 1986 | Hill Street Blues | Albert Sawyer | 1 episode |
| 1989 | The Equalizer | Crocker | Episode: "Silent Fury" |
| 1989 | Wiseguy | Johnny Medley | 4 episodes |
| 1990 | Cop Rock | Detective Bob McIntyre | Main role, 9 episodes |
| 1992 | The Adventures of Superboy | Chaos | 2 episodes |
| 1993 | Law & Order | James Lee Pawl | 1 episode |
| 1993 | Sirens | Leon | 1 episode |
| 1993 | The Commish | Neil Perry | 1 episode |
| 1994 | North and South, Book III | Klawdell | Miniseries, 1 episode |
| 1994–1995 | Under Suspicion | Detective Patrick Clark | Main role, 18 episodes |
| 1996 | Chicago Hope | Bob Broussard | 1 episode |
| 1996 | Champs | Dr. Herb Barton | Main role, 12 episodes |
| 1997 | The X-Files | Leonard Morris Betts | Episode: "Leonard Betts" |
| 1997–2003; 2008 | ER | Dr. Robert Romano | Main role, 107 episodes Won—Screen Actors Guild Award for Outstanding Performance by an Ensemble in a Drama Series (1999); Nominated—Screen Actors Guild Award for Outstanding Performance by an Ensemble in a Drama Series (2000–01) |
| 1997 | Touched by an Angel | Grant Abbott | 1 episode |
| 1997 | Life with Louie | Mel | Voice role, 1 episode |
| 1997 | The Practice | Martin Parks | 2 episodes |
| 1998 | From the Earth to the Moon | Pete Conrad | Miniseries, 1 episode |
| 2001 | Citizen Baines | Sherman Bloom | 2 episodes |
| 2005 | Unscripted | Support Group Leader | 1 episode |
| 2006–2007 | 24 | Graem Bauer | Recurring role, 9 episodes |
| 2008 | Ugly Betty | District Attorney Weitz | 1 episode |
| 2010 | CSI: Crime Scene Investigation | Phil Carpenter | 1 episode |
| 2011 | Harry's Law | Josh Peyton | Recurring role, 7 episodes Primetime Emmy Award for Outstanding Guest Actor in a Drama Series |
| 2013 | Major Crimes | Agent Mark Evans | 1 episode |
| 2015 | Under the Dome | Patrick Walters | 2 episodes |
| 2019–2022 | All Rise | Judge Jonas Laski | Recurring role, 14 episodes |
| 2022 | The Offer | Jack Ballard | Miniseries, 5 episodes |
| 2022 | The Terminal List | Mike Tedesco | 3 episodes |
| 2023 | Barry | Mark | Episode: "it takes a psycho" |
| 2026 | Margo's Got Money Troubles | Judge Andrew Spence | 1 episode |

== Discography ==
- Fame (soundtrack), 1980 soundtrack album to the musical film Fame. Vocals on: "Is It Okay If I Call You Mine?", "Dogs in the Yard", and "I Sing the Body Electric"
