= Ally McBeal season 2 =

Ally McBeal
- Season 2
- No. of episodes: 23

Release
- Original network: Fox
- Original release: September 14, 1998 – May 24, 1999

Season chronology
- ← Previous; Season 1 Next → Season 3

The second season of the television series Ally McBeal commenced airing in the United States on September 14, 1998, concluded on May 24, 1999, and consisted of 23 episodes. On March 22, 1999, Fox aired a special titled Life and Trials of Ally McBeal in which Bill Maher interviewed the cast after nearly finishing two seasons of the show. The special was produced by a different company. The entire season originally aired Mondays at 9pm, just like the season before.

It was released on DVD as a six-disc boxed set under the title of Ally McBeal: Season Two on October 7, 2002. and the U.S. on April 6, 2010.

The second season had an average rating of 13.8 million viewers in the United States and was ranked #20 on the complete ranking sheet of all the year's shows. This was the highest rated season of Ally McBeal.

On the 51st Primetime Emmy Awards, the show won three Emmy Awards in the categories of Outstanding Comedy Series, Outstanding Sound Mixing for a Comedy Series or a Special for the episode "Love's Illusions", and Outstanding Guest Actress in a Comedy Series for Tracey Ullman's portrayal of Dr. Tracy on the episode "Sideshow". On the 56th Golden Globe Awards, the show won in the category of Best Series for the second year in a row.

== Crew ==
The season was produced by 20th Century Fox Television and David E. Kelley Productions. The sole executive producer was the creator David E. Kelley, who also wrote all 23 episodes just like the season before, with the exception of the episode "Just Looking", which he co-wrote with Shelly Landau. Jonathan Pontell and Jeffrey Kramer served as the co-executive producers.

== Cast ==
The second season had ten major roles receive star billing. Calista Flockhart as Ally McBeal, Greg Germann as Richard Fish, Peter MacNicol as John Cage, Jane Krakowski as Elaine Vassal, Lisa Nicole Carson as Renée Raddick, Gil Bellows as Billy Thomas and Courtney Thorne-Smith as Georgia Thomas, all returned to the main cast. Former recurring star Vonda Shepard was upgraded to series regular after appearing in nearly every episode of the previous season.

Lucy Liu and Portia de Rossi premiered as new characters, Ling Woo and Nelle Porter, respectively, in the season premiere and appeared on recurring status until the episode "Making Spirits Bright", when they were upgraded to series regulars. Liu had originally auditioned for the role of Nelle, but David E. Kelley ended up creating a whole new character for her.

Various supporting characters from season one returned to reprise their recurring roles, including Dyan Cannon as Judge Whipper Cone; Albert Hall as Judge Seymore Walsh; Jennifer Holliday as Lisa Knowles; Phil Leeds as Judge Happy Boyle; Jesse L. Martin as Dr. Greg Butters; Harrison Page as Reverend Mark Newman; Tracey Ullman as Dr. Tracy Clark; and Renée Elise Goldsberry, Vatrena King and Sy Smith as the backup singers for Vonda Shepard. The season also included three celebrities: Bruce Willis appearing as a substitute therapist for Ally, Wayne Newton as a radio DJ, and Barry White as himself.

== Episodes ==
No. overall	No. in season	Title	Directed by	Written by	Original release date	Prod. code	Viewers (millions)
24	1	"The Real World"	Jonathan Pontell	David E. Kelley	September 14, 1998	2M01	14.82
Fish and Cage hire a new associate, Nelle "sub-zero" Porter. John confides to Ally about his attraction to Nelle. Ally and John defend a woman in her late 30s who had an affair with a 16-year-old boy.
25	2	"They Eat Horses, Don't They?"	Mel Damski	David E. Kelley	September 21, 1998	2M02	13.25
Nelle's friend and client, Ling Woo, sues a radio DJ for making sexually explicit comments on air; and to the disgust of Ally, drops the case as a legal tactic. Georgia and John defend a restaurant owner sued by two customers after they were served horse meat.
26	3	"Fool's Night Out"	Peter MacNicol	David E. Kelley	September 28, 1998	2M03	15.03
Ling sues a plastic surgeon who passed off his nurse's natural breasts as his implant work. Georgia is upset by Billy's involvement in the trial. Ally represents a minister who broke off a relationship with his choir director, after which she began singing aggressive songs aimed at him.
27	4	"It's My Party"	Jace Alexander	David E. Kelley	October 19, 1998	2M04	14.49
Ally defends George Madison, editor of a feminist magazine fired for his religious views on women. Ally finds herself attracted to George, but Elaine implies that she and George are an item. Ally is told to stop wearing miniskirts in court by the judge; and when she refuses, she is held in contempt and taken into custody. Ally throws a dinner party that descends into anarchy when an argument over women's rights erupts.
28	5	"The Story of Love"	Tom Moore	David E. Kelley	October 26, 1998	2M05	13.85
Ally is arrested after a fight with a young woman angry with her best friend for stealing her boyfriend. After Ally agrees to represent her in court, she discovers the woman's tendency to fire her lawyers. George begins to show an interest in Ally, and Elaine begs her not to date him. John brings in his pet tree frog, Stefan, whom he is training for a competition.
29	6	"World's Without Love"	Arvin Brown	David E. Kelley	November 2, 1998	2M07	14.48
Renee bumps into Matt, an old flame who is currently married, whom she refers to as her "Billy." Ally represents a nun forced to leave her order after breaking the vow of celibacy. John loses Stefan, who makes a reappearance in a toilet bowl, but a panicked Georgia and Nelle manage to injure him, leaving him comatose.
30	7	"Happy Trails"	Jonathan Pontell	David E. Kelley	November 9, 1998	2M08	14.85
John and Richard are nervous about having the first kiss in their respective relationships. Stefan recovers, and is rescued by Ling after he jumps out of a window. However, during a mix-up in a Chinese restaurant, John, Ling, and their friends unknowingly eat Stefan. The lawyers are saddened by the sudden death of Judge Happy Boyle.
31	8	"Just Looking"	Vincent Misiano	David E. Kelley & Shelly Landau	November 16, 1998	2M09	14.57
Nelle, Ally and Georgia defend Ling when she is sued by a group of local mothers protesting her mud-wrestling club as being pornographic. John and Richard go undercover at the club for research. Ally goes on a date with Ray, the opposing council and an old friend of Georgia's.
32	9	"You Never Can Tell"	Adam Nimoy	David E. Kelley	November 23, 1998	2M06	15.31
Ling sues a male employee because she claims he has sexual thoughts about her. Renee sets Ally up on a blind date, but their date is a disaster when Ally gets her finger stuck in a bowling ball. Nelle asks John out on a similarly disastrous date.
33	10	"Making Spirits Bright"	Peter MacNicol	David E. Kelley	December 14, 1998	2M10	15.08
Richard defends a client who claims he was fired for seeing a unicorn. Ally finds a bond with him, as she too saw a unicorn in her youth. Renee and Matt take their relationship to the next level, only for Renee to find out that Matt is still with his wife, and she is pregnant.
34	11	"In Dreams"	Alex Graves	David E. Kelley	January 11, 1999	2M11	15.36
Ally's favorite school teacher is terminally ill, and she wants the right to live out the remainder of her life in a drug-induced coma. Nelle breaks up with John, after telling Richard she thinks John is gay because they have not had sex.
35	12	"Love Unlimited"	Dennie Gordon	David E. Kelley	January 18, 1999	2M12	16.72
Ally defends a woman whose husband of 9 years wants an annulment on the grounds that he was insane when they married. John and Ally attend therapy together, after both of their love lives falter.
36	13	"Angels and Blimps"	Mel Damski	David E. Kelley	February 8, 1999	2M13	14.75
During a trip to the hospital to visit Greg, Ally meets a little boy with leukemia. He wants to sue God; but when Ally tells him it is not possible, Ling reveals she will help him. John and Richard represent a man who attempted to murder his wife and her lover.
37	14	"Pyramids on the Nile"	Elodie Keene	David E. Kelley	February 15, 1999	2M14	15.13
Richard agrees to hire Ling, to the annoyance of the firm except Nelle. Nelle and John defend a couple fired because they were dating. Billy admits he still has feelings for Ally. Ally and Billy share a kiss.
38	15	"Sideshow"	Alex Graves	David E. Kelley	February 22, 1999	2M15	16.94
Ally finds herself distraught over the kiss with Billy. Billy agrees to accompany Ally to a therapy session, but this only adds to Ally's confusion.
39	16	"Sex, Lies, and Politics"	Arlene Sanford	David E. Kelley	March 1, 1999	2M16	16.01
John and Ling help a bookstore owner sue a senator after he falsely accuses her of selling pornography, causing her to lose business. Ally obsesses over the kiss with Billy, and struggles with the urge to tell Georgia.
40	17	"Civil Wars"	Billy Dickson	David E. Kelley	April 5, 1999	2M17	14.25
Georgia finds out about the kiss, and rumors spread through the office. Ally and John oppose Richard and Georgia in court over a date rape case. As tension increases between Georgia and Ally, the two get into a fight in the bathroom with Ling and Nelle, with Elaine filming.
41	18	"Those Lips, that Hand"	Arlene Sanford	David E. Kelley	April 19, 1999	2M18	15.19
Ally and John represent a man who cut off his dead wife's hand as a memento, but he is accused of causing her death. Richard breaks up with Ling because she refuses to sleep with him. Billy and Georgia try to repair their marriage and defend a man who was fired for having a bad comb over.
42	19	"Let's Dance"	Ben Lewin	David E. Kelley	April 26, 1999	2M19	15.96
Elaine is upset when her dance partner gets injured before a competition, until Ling offers to step in and dance. John, Richard, and Nelle defend another law firm against a woman claiming to be discriminated against after taking maternity leave. Ally agrees to go to Billy and Georgia's therapy session.
43	20	"Only the Lonely"	Vincent Misiano	David E. Kelley	May 3, 1999	2M20	13.26
Elaine starts to sell one of her inventions - a face-bra - over infomercials, only to be sued by her aunt, claiming Elaine stole the idea from her cousin Martha. Ally decides to ask Greg out; when she goes to his job, she finds him with another woman.
44	21	"The Green Monster"	Michael Schultz	David E. Kelley	May 10, 1999	2M21	16.33
Richard and John defend a woman who dropped a grand piano on her husband’s Porsche. Georgia starts to wear revealing outfits to work, getting much attention from other men to make Billy jealous.
45	22	"Love's Illusions"	Allan Arkush	David E. Kelley	May 17, 1999	2M22	16.09
Ally starts having bizarre dreams about her childhood. She works on a case where a man sues his wife for fraud after finding she writes love letters to an imaginary man. Ling and Richard take their relationship to the next level, and Billy and Georgia try to spice up their sex life.
46	23	"I Know Him by Heart"	Jonathan Pontell	David E. Kelley	May 24, 1999	2M23	14.94
Ally becomes increasingly depressed about her love life, until Richard gives her a pep talk. Ally and Renee decide to go on as many dates as possible until they find the right man.
