= Ally McBeal season 4 =

Ally McBeal
- Season 4
- DVD cover
- No. of episodes: 23

Release
- Original network: Fox
- Original release: October 23, 2000 – May 21, 2001

Season chronology
- ← Previous; Season 3 Next → Season 5

The fourth season of the television series Ally McBeal commenced airing in the United States on October 23, 2000, concluded on May 21, 2001, and consisted of 23 episodes. The entire season originally aired Mondays at 9pm, just like the seasons before.

It was released on DVD as a six disc boxed set under the title of Ally McBeal: Season Four on February 10, 2002, and this was the very first season of Ally McBeal to be released on DVD.

The fourth season had an average rating of 12.0 million viewers in the United States and was ranked #40 on the complete ranking sheet of all the year's shows. This was the third highest rated season of Ally McBeal.

On the 53rd Primetime Emmy Awards, the show won its final two Emmys in the categories of Outstanding Casting for a Comedy Series for the work of Nikki Valko and Ken Miller, and in the category of Outstanding Supporting Actor in a Comedy Series, for Peter MacNicol's portrayal of John Cage. On the 58th Golden Globe Awards, Robert Downey Jr. won an award for his portrayal of Larry Paul and got a standing ovation as he approached the stage.

== Crew ==
The season was produced by 20th Century Fox Television and David E. Kelley Productions. The executive producers were Bill D'Elia and the creator David E. Kelley, who also wrote all 23 episodes just like the seasons before. Staff writers Alicia Martin, Barb Mackintosh, Melissa Rosenberg, Kerry Lenhart and John J. Sakmar each co-wrote one episode with Kelley. Alice West served as the co-executive producer.

== Cast ==
The fourth season had nine major roles receive star billing. Calista Flockhart as Ally McBeal, Greg Germann as Richard Fish, Peter MacNicol as John Cage, Jane Krakowski as Elaine Vassal, Lisa Nicole Carson as Renée Raddick, Vonda Shepard as herself, Portia de Rossi as Nelle Porter and Lucy Liu as Ling Woo all returned to the main cast.

Robert Downey Jr. was added as a new character named Larry Paul and served as Ally's love interest during the season, but due to the actor's problem with drug addiction, he was written out. The show's season finale was titled The Wedding and was originally going to include Ally's and Larry's wedding. The fifth season had already been planned out, revolving around the characters' married life, and had to be rewritten.

Former castmember Courtney Thorne-Smith returned to guest star on episode Girls' Night Out, where she reunited with Marcia Cross, with whom she worked together on Melrose Place. James LeGros was upgraded to contract status after recurring the previous season, but his character was slowly phased out during the season and written out by the end of it. Lisa Nicole Carson, an original cast member, announced in June 2001 that she would not return for the next season either.

Various supporting characters from the previous seasons returned to reprise their recurring roles, including Albert Hall as Judge Seymore Walsh, Jennifer Holliday as Lisa Knowles, Harrison Page as Reverend Mark Newman, and Renée Elise Goldsberry, Vatrena King and Sy Smith as the backup singers for Vonda Shepard. Taye Diggs appeared as recurring character Jackson Duper and was intended to return as a regular in the following season, but he wasn't picked up. Anne Heche signed on to play John's love interest Melanie; Lisa Edelstein appeared as Mark's love interest Cindy; Josh Groban appeared as a troubled teenager, Malcolm Wyatt; John Michael Higgins appeared as Steven Miler, Ally's therapist.

This season also featured special guest stars Chubby Checker, Sting, Anastacia and KC and the Sunshine Band.

== Episodes ==
No. overall	No. in season	Title	Directed by	Written by	Original release date	Prod. code	Viewers (millions)
68	1	"Sex, Lies and Second Thoughts"	Bill D'Elia	David E. Kelley	October 23, 2000	4M01	13.23
Brian wants Ally to move in, but she has reservations. She searches out Dr. Tracy and finds a new "therapist" has taken her office. The firm represents a woman wishing to annul her six-year-marriage as she feels that her husband married her only for her money.
69	2	"Girls' Night Out"	Jeannot Szwarc	David E. Kelley	October 30, 2000	4M02	13.38
Richard and Ling take Cindy McCauliff's case, meanwhile, Ally organizes a models night at the club to attract men. John and Nelle handle a case about a woman sued for sexually harassing a man.
70	3	"Two's a Crowd"	Rachel Talalay	David E. Kelley	November 6, 2000	4M03	12.62
Mark's girlfriend finally reveals her secret; Ling and Nelle represent a woman suing a relationship guru whose advice ruined the woman's marriage. Ally is dating two different men who are related.
71	4	"Without a Net"	Mel Damski	David E. Kelley	November 13, 2000	4M04	12.86
Ally runs into Kimmie Bishop, an old friend from college. Ally makes fun of her in front of her friends, and Kimmie sues for defamation. Ally hires therapist/lawyer Larry Paul as her defense.
72	5	"The Last Virgin"	Bill D'Elia	David E. Kelley	November 20, 2000	4M05	12.34
Kimmie comes to Cage & Fish looking to hire Ally to sue her old firm for wrongful termination. Ally is nervous about her first kiss with Larry, and seeks advice with Ling.
73	6	"'Tis the Season"	Arlene Sanford	David E. Kelley	November 27, 2000	4M06	14.03
Christmas season is approaching and while Ally is thrilled, Larry has nothing to celebrate. He confesses he has a 7-year-old son in Detroit with his mother.
74	7	"Love on Holiday"	Bethany Rooney	Story by : David E. Kelley & Alicia Martin & Barb Mackintosh; Teleplay by : David E. Kelley	December 4, 2000	4M07	13.03
Elaine is sued by a former office clerk because she called him "peanut" due his size. Nelle and Ling compete in a charity auction dinner date and Cindy (Mark's ex-girlfriend, a trans woman) has plans for Richard for the charity auction.
75	8	"The Man with the Bag"	Billy Dickson	David E. Kelley	December 11, 2000	4M08	14.09
John and Nelle defend her father who was fired from his job as a teacher because he claims he is Santa Claus. Ally feels threatened when Larry's ex comes to town. Since the episode's original broadcast, Vonda Shephard's version of Kay Starr’s Christmas song (Everybody's Waitin' For) The Man with the Bag, has become a popular holiday song.
76	9	"Reason to Believe"	Ron Lagomarsino	David E. Kelley	January 8, 2001	4M09	12.56
Nicholas Engbloom comes to Cage & Fish looking for John to help with a murder case. Melanie West has Tourette syndrome and ran over her boyfriend. Richard teaches Mark how to use a "sex song" to please Elaine in bed.
77	10	"The Ex-Files"	Jack Bender	David E. Kelley	January 15, 2001	4M10	13.55
Larry's ex-girlfriend asks for his permission to take their son to Canada. Because of Larry's sexual attraction to his ex, he starts kissing her but stops immediately, and tells Ally. They get in a fight. Melanie is fired from her job for scaring the children and John takes it to court.
78	11	"Mr. Bo"	Michael Schultz	David E. Kelley	January 22, 2001	4M11	13.77
Melanie takes John to her tiny apartment and introduces him to Mr. Bo, a homeless man. Mr. Bo stalks John and files a complaint against him. Ally takes a case of a woman who fired her secretary because she was slightly overweight and is shocked when she discovers that Cage & Fish only hire hot female lawyers.
79	12	"Hats Off to Larry"	Jeannot Szwarc	Story by : David E. Kelley & Melissa Rosenberg & Barb Mackintosh; Teleplay by : David E. Kelley	February 5, 2001	4M12	13.75
Larry's son flies in from Detroit and goes to Cage & Fish looking for Ally. He wants to sue his parents for emotional damage. Nelle is representing her dance instructor/lover Sam Adams in court. He is suing his ex-partner for stealing his dance moves. Cindy McCauliff returns to the office looking for Richard. Larry realizes his son needs him in Detroit. Ally persuades him to go. He leaves promising he will come back.
80	13	"Reach Out and Touch"	Kenny Ortega	David E. Kelley	February 12, 2001	4M13	12.32
Ally has hallucinations with Barry Manilow. Richard assigns Ling to work with Jackson Duper, the firm's newest lawyer. They have to handle a double case of a man who wants his marriage annulled because his wife is a nymphomaniac and cheated on him 106 times, and is suing the minister for having a torrid affair with her.
81	14	"Boys Town"	David Grossman	David E. Kelley	February 19, 2001	4M14	13.19
Richard and John's relationship grows more tense and they attend couples therapy; Jackson's presence has a profound impact on Elaine; Jackson represent a woman sued for firing all her male employees.
82	15	"Falling Up"	Oz Scott	David E. Kelley	February 26, 2001	4M15	13.85
Jackson and Renee's one night stand turns into something more. Ally visits several therapists to get over her hallucinations of Larry. John represents a man who wants to annul his marriage after his wife decides she does not want children, a case that carries over into John's relationship with Melanie.
83	16	"The Getaway"	Bill D'Elia	David E. Kelley	March 19, 2001	4M16	12.48
Richard and John go for a vacation in Los Angeles. It turns into a working vacation when John must get Richard out of legal trouble, and help a woman divorcing her wealthy husband. Richard helps a struggling actress leave her agent who is using her to run an escort service.
84	17	"The Pursuit of Unhappiness"	Kenny Ortega	Story by : David E. Kelley & Kerry Lenhart & John J. Sakmar; Teleplay by : David E. Kelley	March 26, 2001	4M17	12.39
Elaine breaks up with Mark after she tells him that she cheated on him. Jackson is assigned to do the pre-nup for a rich, fat, bald man. Ally puts Larry to defend the future wife's interests, leading to a personal dissension between Larry and Jackson. Ling takes the case of a man sued by his son because a blood clot has left him perpetually happy, ruining the family business.
85	18	"The Obstacle Course"	Joanna Kerns	David E. Kelley & Kayla Alpert	April 16, 2001	4M18	11.96
Cassandra surprises John when she shows up at the office. Ally takes the case of a man sued because he did not reveal to his internet date that he was a dwarf. Ling and Jackson take a case of a woman suing her old boyfriend for interrupting her wedding ceremony.
86	19	"In Search of Barry White"	Adam Arkin	David E. Kelley	April 23, 2001	4M19	11.76
John loses his ability to channel Barry White while going up against Larry in a case involving a man who wants to clone his late wife. Nelle hooks Elaine into on-line romance; Ling's feelings for Jackson grow more intense.
87	20	"Cloudy Skies, Chance of Parade"	Billy Dickson	David E. Kelley	April 30, 2001	4M20	12.63
Larry defends Sting when a man sues him for breaking up his marriage; a Streisand impersonator sues over his nose job; Richard flirts with Cindy Margolis to make Ling jealous.
88	21	"Queen Bee"	Bethany Rooney	David E. Kelley	May 7, 2001	4M21	11.82
Sydney Gale hires Cage & Fish to represent her, she is sued for wrongful termination; Richard and John take the case. Reverend Mark Newman is having problems concerning Lisa Knowles's performance at church. After Jackson's strategy fails, it is in Nelle's hands.
89	22	"Home Again"	Michael Schultz	David E. Kelley	May 14, 2001	4M22	12.65
When Larry's surprise engagement plan goes awry, he's convinced it is an omen. Fish flies to LA to help the aspiring actress Jane Wilco stop a man's magazine from publishing nude pictures of her.
90	23	"The Wedding"	Bill D'Elia	David E. Kelley	May 21, 2001	4M23	11.02
Malcolm Wyatt (Josh Groban) hires Ally to take his case; he is suing a girl for not going to the prom with him after she said yes in the fall. The opposing lawyer is Larry Paul, but he never shows up. Richard hires Jane Wilco as the office's new secretary. Ally talks to Billy's ghost and decides to go to Malcolm's prom as his date, and convinces him to sing solo ("You're Still You") and never stop believing in love.
