= Ally McBeal season 3 =

Ally McBeal
- Season 3
- DVD cover
- No. of episodes: 21

Release
- Original network: Fox
- Original release: October 25, 1999 – May 22, 2000

Season chronology
- ← Previous; Season 2 Next → Season 4

The third season of the television series Ally McBeal commenced airing in the United States on October 25, 1999, concluded on May 22, 2000, and consisted of 21 episodes. The entire season originally aired Mondays at 9pm, just like the seasons before.

A month before the premiere of the season, Fox began airing Ally, a half-hour show that consisted of re-edited scenes from the first two seasons and previously unseen footage, with the intention of making it a sitcom. 13 episodes of the show were shot, but only 10 were broadcast.

It was released on DVD as a six disc boxed set under the title of Ally McBeal: Season Three on October 7, 2002, just like the two seasons that aired before and in the U.S. on December 22, 2009.

The third season had an average rating of 12.3 million viewers in the United States and was ranked #39 on the complete ranking sheet of all the year's shows. This was the second highest rated season of Ally McBeal.

On the 52nd Primetime Emmy Awards, the show won an Emmy in the category of Outstanding Sound Mixing for a Comedy Series or a Special for the season premiere episode Car Wash. Kevin Fallon cited the sex scene from the episode Car Wash as one of "TV's 13 Dirtiest Sex Scenes" in a column for The Daily Beast.

== Crew ==
The season was produced by 20th Century Fox Television and David E. Kelley Productions. The executive producers were Bill D'Elia and the creator David E. Kelley, who also wrote all 23 episodes just like the two seasons before, with the exception of co-writing the episodes Out in the Cold and In Search of Pygmies with Josh Caplan, and co-writing the episode Turning Thirty with Jill Goldsmith. Jonathan Pontell and Alicia West served as the co-executive producers.

== Cast ==
The third season had ten major roles receive star billing. Calista Flockhart as Ally McBeal, Greg Germann as Richard Fish, Peter MacNicol as John Cage, Jane Krakowski as Elaine Vassal, Lisa Nicole Carson as Renée Raddick, Gil Bellows as Billy Thomas, Courtney Thorne-Smith as Georgia Thomas, Vonda Shepard as herself, Portia de Rossi as Nelle Porter and Lucy Liu as Ling Woo all returned to the main cast.

The season featured the departure of two original cast members, Gil Bellows and Courtney Thorne-Smith. Bellows left to star on The Agency and Thorne Smith was cast on According to Jim. Bellows' character was killed off in the episode Boy Next Door. According to the actor himself, the character was originally intended to stay only for one season, but the popularity kept him for two more.

James LeGros made his debut as Mark Albert, a lawyer that replaced Billy at the firm. The character was recurring, and was upgraded to contract status as of season 4.

Various supporting characters from the previous seasons returned to reprise their recurring roles, including Dyan Cannon making her final appearances as Judge Jennifer "Whipper" Cone, Albert Hall as Judge Seymore Walsh, Jennifer Holliday as Lisa Knowles, Harrison Page as Reverend Mark Newman, Tracey Ullman as Dr. Tracy Clark, and Renée Elise Goldsberry, Vatrena King and Sy Smith as the backup singers for Vonda Shepard. Gina Philips had a recurring role as Billy's secretary Sandy Hingle.

This season also featured a variety of celebrities. Al Green, Gladys Knight, and Gloria Gaynor all appeared in the form of Ally's hallucinations, while Macy Gray and Randy Newman appeared as performers at the bar. Farrah Fawcett portrays Robin Jones, a newspaper editor accused of sexual harassment. Loretta Devine appeared as a client who also sings during the course of one of Ally's hallucinations following Billy's death. And Tina Turner made an appearance.

== Episodes ==
No. overall	No. in season	Title	Directed by	Written by	Original release date	Prod. code	Viewers (millions)
47	1	"Car Wash"	Billy Dickson	David E. Kelley	October 25, 1999	3M01	16.02
Ally has random sex with a man at a car wash, only to realize he is the fiance of a client that she has agreed to be a bridesmaid. Renee and Whipper open their own law firm.
48	2	"Buried Pleasures"	Mel Damski	David E. Kelley	November 1, 1999	3M02	16.86
Ling and Ally kiss, then establish there is a missing ingredient, the penis, and they decide to never kiss another woman again.
49	3	"Seeing Green"	Peter MacNicol	David E. Kelley	November 8, 1999	3M03	13.65
Ally's hallucinations worsen as she falls in love with her imaginary Al Green. Billy joins a self-help group for men who want to work on their chauvinism.
50	4	"Heat Wave"	Alex Graves	David E. Kelley	November 15, 1999	3M04	14.98
Ally gets sued by Risa, the woman whose wedding she destroyed in the season opener. Billy decides to get his hair colored and to hire a new and beautiful assistant.
51	5	"Troubled Water"	Joanna Kerns	David E. Kelley	November 22, 1999	3M05	14.52
Billy goes completely crazy on the day before Thanksgiving, driving Georgia to kiss "George" in the bar. Ally invites her friends and family to her place for a holiday dinner. "George" is revealed to be Ally's father. Ally's other guests are forced to exit her apartment to finish dinner at Fish's place.
52	6	"Changes"	Arlene Sanford	David E. Kelley	November 29, 1999	3M06	14.65
Billy and Cage represent Robin Jones, a sexy, middle-aged women suing her employees for sexual harassment. Robin claims the staff of her magazine held a "sick out," delaying the May publication because they did not want to work for a "nymph". Richard and Ling officially break up. As they lose their case, Billy and Robin argue over his chauvinistic principles, but settle it with a kiss - as Georgia walks in on the duo.
53	7	"Saving Santa"	Rachel Talalay	David E. Kelley	December 13, 1999	3M07	14.40
The first case Georgia brings to Renee's new firm pits them against Cage and Fish. Georgia defends Newman's, an upscale department store against Steve Mallory, the store Santa for 17 years. Cage represents Mallory, claiming he was wrongfully fired because Newman wants a younger, thinner Santa. Ally brings Georgia and Billy together to talk, and Billy sees that he wants Georgia back. But Georgia is not as eager to work things out.
54	8	"Blue Christmas"	Jonathan Pontell	David E. Kelley	December 20, 1999	3M08	12.86
Elaine finds a baby in a nativity scene and wants to keep him, so she gets Cage and Ally to represent her in a custody battle. Billy attempts to iron things out with Georgia. After not being able to convince the others that she can be sexy, Ally does a memorable performance of "Santa Baby" at the Christmas party.
55	9	"Out in the Cold"	Dennie Gordon	Story by : David E. Kelley & Josh Caplan; Teleplay by : David E. Kelley	January 10, 2000	3M09	15.70
Ally befriends a homeless man, a writer doing research on homelessness. Ling is arrested for running a brothel when one of her escorts has sex with a high school boy. Billy, still on his pro-testosterone kick, hires six of Ling's escorts to be his assistants. Cage and Nelle have an argument after she finds out he had once hired an escort.
56	10	"Just Friends"	Michael Schultz	David E. Kelley	January 17, 2000	3M10	14.41
Ally has a romantic dream about Cage and wakes up thinking he may be the one for her. When she finally gets up the courage to tell him, he admits that he often thought she might be the one for him also. Elaine goes on a date with a great guy only to learn that he asked her out because his friend said she was easy. Georgia serves Billy with divorce papers, with Renee agreeing to represent her.
57	11	"Over the Rainbow"	Alan Myerson	David E. Kelley	February 7, 2000	3M11	14.70
The firm is shocked when Georgia sues them for the destruction of her marriage.
58	12	"In Search of Pygmies"	Arvin Brown	Story by : David E. Kelley & Josh Caplan; Teleplay by : David E. Kelley	February 14, 2000	3M12	13.98
Ling defends an old friend asked to leave his retirement home because the director finds his exuberant imagination disruptive for other residents. While Ling tries to decide whether her friend truly believes in his make-believe world or just pretends to, he suffers from a hallucination that has fatal results.
59	13	"Pursuit of Loneliness"	Jonathan Pontell	David E. Kelley	February 21, 2000	3M13	15.11
Ally is pursued by Hammond, the server at her coffee shop, but is turned off by his forwardness. Ally snubs Hammond, only to walk into an appeals court and find he is a presiding judge in her case. When Ally is rude to him in court, he throws her in jail for contempt. John worries Nelle is a snob, and Billy finally kisses his assistant Sandy.
60	14	"The Oddball Parade"	Bryan Gordon	David E. Kelley	February 28, 2000	3M14	15.23
Cage and Fish represent a group of oddballs fired from their jobs. One client is a transvestite, one has Obsessive Compulsive Disorder, one is somewhat dorky and nerd-like, and one is obese. Ally and Elaine enter a dance contest in which the winner gets to perform as one of Tina Turner's back-up dancers at the bar. Billy and Ally agree to rekindle their friendship.
61	15	"Prime Suspect"	Rachel Talalay	David E. Kelley	March 20, 2000	3M15	14.41
Cage's 'oddball' client is accused of murdering his old boss and the firm gets involved in their first murder trial. Ally plays detective and goes snooping when things in the case turn dismal.
62	16	"Boy Next Door"	Jack Bender	David E. Kelley	March 27, 2000	3M16	14.55
Nelle breaks up with John while he is stuck in an elevator. Billy represents a woman in an annulment action case whose husband wants out of the marriage. The case gets sidetracked when Billy reveals the truth about his health: he has a brain tumor. During his closing argument he reveals in court that he still is and always will be in love with Ally – then dies from a cerebral hemorrhage.
63	17	"I Will Survive"	Barnet Kellman	David E. Kelley	April 17, 2000	3M17	13.05
While grieving for Billy, Gloria Gaynor stalks Ally around singing I Will Survive. Ally and Ling represent a woman who beat her cheating husband to death with his prosthetic leg. Fish brings in a new lawyer and assigns him to Ally's case.
64	18	"Turning Thirty"	Jeannot Szwarc	David E. Kelley & Jill Goldsmith	May 1, 2000	3M18	12.11
The firm defends a woman accused of murdering her 89-year-old husband via suffocation by her breasts. Ally struggles with turning thirty. She goes to church to find God, but instead finds an angry Reverend Newman who has a pet peeve about women who only need God between relationships.
65	19	"Do You Wanna Dance?"	Michael Lange	David E. Kelley	May 8, 2000	3M19	10.75
Ally engages in virtual sex. At Renee’s prompting, Ally tries to arrange a meeting. Upon seeing Brian, the opposing counsel in a case she and Mark are trying, she immediately is drawn to him. Ally is in hot water when she realizes she has been chatting with an underage teen (Jonathan Taylor Thomas).
66	20	"Hope and Glory"	Mel Damski	David E. Kelley	May 15, 2000	3M20	11.50
Nelle schemes to leave Cage & Fish to start her own firm, leaving Richard and John furious. Elaine accepts Nelle's offer to leave the firm. Ally dates Brian Selig.
67	21	"Ally McBeal: The Musical, Almost"	Bill D'Elia	David E. Kelley	May 22, 2000	3M21	11.17
Brian and Ally go to dinner with her parents. Nelle tells her lawyer, Hope, she thinks she made a mistake leaving the firm and wants to go back. Renee sings the blues at the bar. The following day Ally's mother visits and tells her she hurt her father's feelings at the dinner the night before.
