= Ally McBeal season 1 =

Ally McBeal
- Season 1
- No. of episodes: 23

Release
- Original network: Fox
- Original release: September 8, 1997 – May 18, 1998

Season chronology
- Next → Season 2

The first season of the television series Ally McBeal began airing in the United States on September 8, 1997, concluded on May 18, 1998, and consisted of 23 episodes. It tells the story of the titular character, a young lawyer who finds herself without a job after being sexually harassed by her boss, only to end up employed by her friend from college, Richard Fish, to work in the firm he created with his friend John Cage, named "Cage & Fish".

The entire season aired Mondays at 9 pm. It was released on DVD as a six disc boxed set under the title of Ally McBeal: Season One on October 7, 2002. Due to music rights issues, several episodes of the first season of Ally McBeal were only available in the United States. The first season had an average rating of 11.4 million viewers in the United States and was ranked #59 on the complete ranking sheet of all the year's shows. A month after the conclusion of the first season, a debate sparked by the show was the cover story of Time magazine, which juxtaposed McBeal with three pioneering feminists and asked "Is Feminism Dead?".

On the 50th Primetime Emmy Awards, the show won its first Emmy in the category of Outstanding Sound Mixing for a Comedy Series or a Special for the episode "Boy to the World", and was nominated in nine other categories. On the 55th Golden Globe Awards, the show won in two categories, one for the Best Series, and one for the Best Actress, for Calista Flockhart's portrayal of Ally.

== Crew ==
The season was produced by 20th Century Fox Television and David E. Kelley Productions. The sole executive producer was the creator David E. Kelley, who also wrote all 23 episodes, with the exception of co-writing with Nicole Yorkin and Dawn Prestwich on the episode "Body Language" and with Jeff Pinkner on the episode "Once in a Lifetime". Jonathan Pontell served as the supervising producer, while Jeffrey Kramer served as the co-executive producer.

== Cast ==
The first season had seven major roles receive star billing. Calista Flockhart portrayed protagonist Ally McBeal, a lawyer employed by her friend Richard Fish, who was played by Greg Germann. Fish opened a firm with John Cage, played by Peter MacNicol, who was billed as a guest star during the first eleven episodes and promoted to series regular status in episode number 12. Jane Krakowski played Ally's secretary Elaine Vassal, while the role of Ally's friend Renée Raddick was played by Lisa Nicole Carson. Ally's love from childhood, Billy Thomas, was played by Gil Bellows, while Courtney Thorne-Smith played his wife Georgia, who works with her husband at the same law firm.

Various supporting characters included Dyan Cannon as Whipper Cone, a judge who had a relationship with Richard Fish for a while; Albert Hall as Seymore Walsh, a stern judge with little sense of humor and a general dislike of the Cage and Fish law firm; Jennifer Holliday as Lisa Knowles, the lead choir singer at the local church who had a history with the reverend; Phil Leeds as Happy Boyle, a very old judge who was obsessed with dental hygiene; Jesse L. Martin as Ally's date, Dr. Greg Butters; Harrison Page as the reverend at the local church, who had a history with lead choir singer Lisa Knowles; Tracey Ullman as Ally's unconventional therapist; and Vonda Shepard as a musical performer at the bar where the lawyers used to hang out every night after finishing their daily jobs. Shepard performed in every episode of the entire season, and was upped to series regular status in the upcoming season. Renée Elise Goldsberry, Vatrena King and Sy Smith appeared at the bar as the Ikettes, the backup singers for Vonda and other performers. The first season also included a crossover episode from another David E. Kelley show, The Practice. The second part of the crossover was the episode titled "Axe Murderer" which began on the Ally McBeal episode titled "The Inmates", which aired April 27, 1998, and has several characters from The Practice. Calista Flockhart and Gil Bellows, in return, guest starred on The Practice episode "Axe Murderer".

== Episodes ==
No. overall	No. in season	Title	Directed by	Written by	Original release date	Prod. code	Viewers (millions)
1	1	"Pilot"	James Frawley	David E. Kelley	September 8, 1997	AM00	9.90
Ally McBeal is introduced as flashbacks of her and ex-boyfriend Billy Thomas are displayed in montage. Ally loses her job at her law firm when she files a sexual harassment claim against a colleague. A chance meeting with ex-classmate Richard Fish results in Ally being offered a job at his new law firm. To Ally's shock, Billy works at the law firm and he has an attractive wife, Georgia.
2	2	"Compromising Positions"	Jonathan Pontell	David E. Kelley	September 15, 1997	AM01	8.78
Richard's business partner and co-partner, John Cage, is arrested for soliciting a prostitute. Ally discovers an unsavory fact about Billy's past when they are assigned to Cage's case. Richard invites Ally for a meal with him, his girlfriend Whipper and potential client Ronald Cheanie in an attempt to pair Ally and Ronald.
3	3	"The Kiss"	Dennie Gordon	David E. Kelley	September 22, 1997	AM02	8.35
Ally wonders why Ronald failed to kiss her after their first date. Georgia and Ally work on an age discrimination case where the opposing litigator is the ex-colleague Ally sued at her previous law firm.
4	4	"The Affair"	Arlene Sanford	David E. Kelley	September 29, 1997	AM03	8.93
Ally is asked to give a eulogy for one of her professors from college. She is reluctant because his wife is unaware about the affair they had years earlier. Georgia and Ronald feel threatened when Billy attends the funeral with Ally.
5	5	"One Hundred Tears Away"	Sandy Smolan	David E. Kelley	October 20, 1997	AM04	9.13
Ally attacks another shopper during a supermarket dispute and forgets to pay for spermicide. Ally is charged with assault and shoplifting. Her best friend Renee, a district attorney, gets her out of the charges; but rumors spread, and Ally is called before the State Bar Review where her eccentric behavior is questioned.
6	6	"The Promise"	Victoria Hochberg	David E. Kelley	October 27, 1997	AM05	8.49
Ally and John defend Whipper's friend on a solicitation charge. While working with John, Ally notices his unique approach to work. During another case, Ally gives mouth-to-mouth resuscitation to an overweight lawyer working with the opposition when he suffers a near heart attack.
7	7	"The Attitude"	Michael Schultz	David E. Kelley	November 3, 1997	AM06	9.77
Ally takes the case of a Jewish lady who wants her rabbi to grant a spiritual release from her marriage, because her husband is comatose. Ally and the rabbi insult each other repeatedly. Georgia is asked to leave her law firm, because her boss' wife is uncomfortable with her husband working with an attractive woman. Richard offers her a job at Cage and Fish.
8	8	"Drawing the Lines"	Mel Damski	David E. Kelley	November 10, 1997	AM07	10.36
Billy and Georgia experience marital difficulties when he reveals to Ally that he still has feelings for her. Ally and Georgia try to help a client get around her prenuptial agreement when her husband leaves her for another woman. Elaine threatens to sue the firm for sexual harassment on behalf of the office women when the men begin to ogle the mail deliverer. She hires aggressive lawyer Caroline Poop (Sandra Bernhard).
9	9	"The Dirty Joke"	Dan Attias	David E. Kelley	November 17, 1997	AM08	10.59
After Renee makes fun of Ally for being a prudish "Julie Andrews type" they agree to each tell their best dirty joke to see who can get the best reaction from a crowd. Caroline Poop files a sexual harassment claim against Cage and Fish.
10	10	"Boy to the World"	Thomas Schlamme	David E. Kelley	December 1, 1997	AM09	9.63
Whipper asks Ally to take the case of a young transgender sex worker, Stephanie, charged for solicitation for the third time. Ally is moved by Stephanie's situation and gets her a job at Cage and Fish. Richard's eccentric uncle dies, and his minister refuses to let the man's bigotry towards short people be mentioned during his funeral service.
11	11	"Silver Bells"	Joe Napolitano	David E. Kelley	December 15, 1997	AM10	8.83
Richard asks Ally and John to represent three people requesting the right to legally have a three-way marriage. Ally is disgusted by the idea until Georgia points out the similarities between the case and the triangle they are in with Billy. Richard feels forced into proposing to Whipper. Richard is hosting the annual Christmas party, and John wants to ask Ally to be his date.
12	12	"Cro-Magnon"	Allan Arkush	David E. Kelley	January 5, 1998	AM11	13.47
Ally, Renee, and Georgia take an art class and are all drawn to a well endowed male nude model. Ally is assigned the case of a 19-year-old charged with assault after punching the ex-boyfriend of his date when he verbally abused her. Ally is disturbed that she finds herself attracted to her client despite his young age. In 2009, TV Guide ranked this episode #94 on its list of the 100 Greatest Episodes.
13	13	"The Blame Game"	Sandy Smolan	David E. Kelley	January 19, 1998	AM12	14.26
Ally bumps into the male model in Starbucks and confronts him for the way he treated her. John is assigned a case to help two siblings sue an airline after their father died in a plane crash.
14	14	"Body Language"	Mel Damski	David E. Kelley & Nicole Yorkin & Dawn Prestwich	February 2, 1998	AM13	13.62
Ally and Georgia represent a woman wishing to marry a death row inmate, resulting in Ally being a bridesmaid. Richard asks Ally to flirt with a judge. Whipper catches Richard touching Janet Reno's neck, a fetish of his.
15	15	"Once in a Lifetime"	Elodie Keene	Story by : David E. Kelley & Jeff Pinkner; Teleplay by : David E. Kelley	February 23, 1998	AM14	12.55
Ally and Billy represent an elderly artist fighting to maintain control of his estate after his son decides he is too senile to stay in charge. Ally agrees to date with John, but once she feels uncomfortable she tries to get him to cancel. John realizes Ally still loves Billy.
16	16	"Forbidden Fruits"	Jeremy Kagan	David E. Kelley	March 2, 1998	AM15	14.25
The firm takes on a high profile case of a US Senator sued for "interfering with marital relations", and when the case starts to become disturbingly similar to the situation between Ally, Billy, and Georgia, the latter decides she can not work on the case. Renee starts to worry about Ally when she starts to see the dancing baby more frequently.
17	17	"Theme of Life"	Dennie Gordon	David E. Kelley	March 9, 1998	AM16	15.69
Ally, Georgia, and Renee join a kickboxing class, and Ally and Georgia are scheduled to fight together. Ally defends a surgeon Greg charged with performing a controversial operation and finds herself attracted to him. John suggests Ally visits his therapist.
18	18	"The Playing Field"	Jonathan Pontell	David E. Kelley	March 16, 1998	AM17	15.42
Ally and Greg are involved in a car accident. Ally discovers her latest opposing counsel is a 10-year-old genius; but only after she kicked him, believing him to be the dancing baby. Richard represents a woman suing for sexual harassment after being passed over for promotion for refusing to sleep with her boss.
19	19	"Happy Birthday Baby"	Thomas Schlamme	David E. Kelley	April 6, 1998	AM18	13.67
Ally is upset about her impending birthday but friends and coworkers arrange a surprise party at the bar. Greg and Renee perform a seductive duet, leading to tension between the duo and Ally. Ally defends a man who broke into his date's house to touch her feet.
20	20	"The Inmates"	Michael Schultz	David E. Kelley	April 27, 1998	AM19	12.68
Billy takes on a case of a woman charged with murdering her husband. Georgia represents a man fired from his job for being heterosexual. Renee is arrested for assault and battery after attacking her date when he tried to pressure her into sex. This episode begins a crossover with The Practice that concludes on "Axe Murderer".
21	21	"Being There"	Mel Damski	David E. Kelley	May 4, 1998	AM20	14.86
As Renee's trial continues, she becomes worried by John's unusual tactics in court. Ally has to confront Renee about her sexual aggressiveness. Georgia takes a pregnancy test which comes up positive.
22	22	"Alone Again"	Dennis Dugan	David E. Kelley	May 11, 1998	AM21	14.07
John opposes a woman he was in love with at law school and, after some encouragement by Ally, tells her how he feels. Georgia and Richard take on the case of a jilted bride and feel bias when Whipper is assigned as the judge.
23	23	"These Are the Days"	Jonathan Pontell	David E. Kelley	May 18, 1998	AM22	14.35
John represents his cousin who feels a strange compulsion to hit people over the head to get them to realize who they love. Ally along with Bobby Donnell, represents two men who want to swap hearts; one wants to give his healthy heart to his sick friend, but Ally is forced into making the final decision in the case. Georgia and Billy decide to be more spontaneous and risky with their lovemaking in order to spice up their marriage.
