= Ally McBeal season 5 =

Ally McBeal
- Season 5
- DVD cover
- No. of episodes: 22

Release
- Original network: Fox
- Original release: October 29, 2001 – May 20, 2002

Season chronology
- ← Previous; Season 4

The fifth and final season of the television series Ally McBeal commenced airing in the United States on October 29, 2001, concluded on May 20, 2002, and consisted of 22 episodes. The entire season originally aired Mondays at 9pm, just like the seasons before. Following the episode that aired March 4, 2002, the show went on a six-week hiatus and was replaced by The American Embassy. The show returned on April 15, 2002, to air the final 7 episodes.

It was released on DVD as a six disc boxed set under the title of Ally McBeal: Season Five on February 10, 2003.

The fifth season had an average rating of 9.4 million viewers in the United States and was ranked #65 on the complete ranking sheet of all the year's shows. In addition to being the lowest-rated season of Ally McBeal and the grounds for the show's cancellation on April 18, 2002, it was also the only season of the show that failed to win any Emmy or Golden Globe awards.

== Crew ==
The season was produced by 20th Century Fox Television and David E. Kelley Productions. The executive producers were Bill D'Elia and the creator David E. Kelley, who also wrote 21 out of 22 episodes. (This season's "Blowin' in the Wind" is the only episode of the entire series which Kelley is not credited either with writing himself or with jointly writing.) Staff writers this season included Constance M. Burge, Roberto Benabib, Peter Blake and Cindy Lichtman. Cast member Peter MacNicol co-wrote the penultimate episodes with Kelley, while Greg Germann made his directing debut in the episode Fear of Flirting. Alice West served as the co-executive producer of this season.

== Cast ==
The fifth season had twelve major roles receive star billing, the most out of all of the seasons. Calista Flockhart as Ally McBeal, Greg Germann as Richard Fish, Peter MacNicol as John Cage, Jane Krakowski as Elaine Vassal, Vonda Shepard as herself, Portia de Rossi as Nelle Porter and Lucy Liu as Ling Woo all returned to the main cast.

Robert Downey Jr.'s Larry Paul was intended to be a main character in the fifth season. The season arc had already been planned out, revolving around the married life of Larry and Ally, which had to be rewritten following Downey's arrest on drug charges.

Cast members Peter MacNicol and Lucy Liu only signed on for a certain number of episodes and were subsequently written out. MacNicol agreed to return on recurring status and stayed until the show's finale, whereas Liu was unable to return during the final episodes of the season due to her conflicting filming commitments for the film Charlie's Angels: Full Throttle. Former cast members Gil Bellows, Courtney Thorne-Smith and Lisa Nicole Carson returned for the finale.

The new cast members introduced in the season premiere were Julianne Nicholson as Jenny Shaw, Josh Hopkins as Raymond Millbury and James Marsden as Glenn Foy. Nicholson and Marsden's characters proved unpopular with the fans and were written out mid-season, while new character named Maddie Harrington, played by Hayden Panettiere was added to the regular cast. Regina Hall was upgraded to contract status after recurring during the previous season.

Various supporting characters from the previous seasons returned to reprise their recurring roles, including Albert Hall as Judge Seymore Walsh, John Michael Higgins as Steven Milter, and Renée Elise Goldsberry, Vatrena King and Sy Smith as the backup singers for Vonda Shepard. Jon Bon Jovi was added to the cast mid-season as Victor Morrison, Ally's new love interest, but was written out before the finale. Josh Groban returned as guest star Malcolm Wyatt. Barry Humphries, Matthew Perry and Christina Ricci all had recurring roles during the season. Elton John, Mariah Carey and Barry White appeared as performers at the bar. Shepard was offered to sing the theme song "Searchin' My Soul" from start to finish in the final episode, but she turned it down. Boz Scaggs also appeared as himself in the season premiere to sing "It's Over", hearkening back to a recurring joke from season 2.

== Episodes ==
No. overall	No. in season	Title	Directed by	Written by	Original release date	Prod. code	Viewers (millions)
91	1	"Friends and Lovers"	Bill D'Elia	David E. Kelley	October 29, 2001	5M01	10.95
Ally hires Jenny to work as an associate at Cage and Fish. Jenny comes face to face with her old boyfriend when he is the other new associate at Cage and Fish. Cage misunderstands Ally when he overhears her say she loves him and sets out to win her heart.
92	2	"Judge Ling"	Oz Scott	David E. Kelley	November 5, 2001	5M02	10.20
Jenny, Ally and Glenn are assigned to chair the telemarketing case. Coretta convinces John that he must look good to make a good impression and John ends up dressing in a fake muscle suit to get rid of his weird-women magnetism. Ling and Nelle 'compliment' twin babies on the street. The mother of the babies is the Massachusetts governor, who offers Ling a judge position.
93	3	"Neutral Corners"	Arvin Brown	David E. Kelley	November 12, 2001	5M03	10.40
Ally has a dream about Raymond and Glenn. Ally decides to make an infomercial using Ling's TV show crew and Claire Otoms as the announcer. Glenn tells Ally he is not interested in her, and Raymond asks Glenn if he should date Ally. John confesses his feelings for Ally and is disappointed when she says they will never be more than friends.
94	4	"Fear of Flirting"	Greg Germann	David E. Kelley & Constance M. Burge & Roberto Benabib	November 19, 2001	5M04	9.84
Ally and Glenn continue flirting, leading to a conscious avoidance of each other. John takes off, worrying the ladies of the firm, especially Nelle. Richard takes over John’s abandoned hole off of the unisex. Raymond is sued by a former opposing lawyer for sexual harassment and asks Jenny to represent him.
95	5	"I Want Love"	Michael Schultz	David E. Kelley	November 26, 2001	5M05	10.88
Jenny's mother is fired from her job for dating a 20-year-old. Jenny wants Ally to lose the case. Ally's closing makes Jenny change her mind and she accepts her soon-to-be stepfather. Ling looks for more exciting cases for her show and brings an entire orchestra to her court.
96	6	"Lost and Found"	Mel Damski	Story by : David E. Kelley & Peter Blake; Teleplay by : David E. Kelley	December 3, 2001	5M06	9.40
John makes a surprise return, and is shocked after hearing Richard threw a party in his "hole." Raymond gets Glenn and Ally to double date with him and Jenny, but Jenny and Glen get back together. Ling poses nude to boost her TV character. Coretta and Richard find themselves involved in a police investigation on a woman marries rich old men for the money.
97	7	"Nine One One"	Billy Dickson	David E. Kelley	December 10, 2001	5M07	9.27
Ally helps a minister fired from his church for not believing in God. John takes a case opposite a mayor who canceled the Christmas parade due to a disaster in which people died. Jenny and Elaine confront each other about Elaine's performance with Glenn in the office's Christmas party.
98	8	"Playing with Matches"	David Semel	Story by : David E. Kelley & Constance M. Burge & Roberto Benabib; Teleplay by : David E. Kelley	January 7, 2002	5M08	9.99
Jenny's mother's wedding is approaching. Ally and Jenny are shocked when the soon to be stepfather puts the moves on Ally. John and Coretta help Kimmie Bishop sue a matchmaker for saying she is "unmatchable."
99	9	"Blowin' in the Wind"	Rachel Talalay	Constance M. Burge & Roberto Benabib & Cindy Lichtman	January 14, 2002	5M09	10.32
Ally impulsively buys a house. Richard gets the others to help paint the house as a surprise for Ally, who hires handyman Victor to fix the house. Ally handles a case of a man who spent too much money buying gifts for his wife until they went bankrupt.
100	10	"One Hundred Tears"	Bill D'Elia	David E. Kelley	January 21, 2002	5M10	10.79
Ally defends a man who broke into his old house to jump out of his old bedroom window. Harvey Hall believes he can fly using wings he made. Harriet Pumple tries to find a match for Elaine, Coretta, Richard and John. She matches Elaine with Victor. When John refuses to let Harriet find a match for him, the entire office sings "We Gotta Get You A Woman" for him.
101	11	"A Kick in the Head"	David Grossman & Jeannot Szwarc	David E. Kelley	February 4, 2002	5M11	11.82
10-year-old Maddie Harrington shows up on Ally's door saying she is her daughter, the result of a mix-up on the egg bank Ally deposited her eggs ten years ago. Maddie decides to stay in Boston with Ally on a trial basis until they resolve where she will stay. Richard takes the case of a man who killed his wife after kicking her in the head when he mistook her for a soccer ball.
102	12	"The New Day"	Bethany Rooney	David E. Kelley	February 11, 2002	5M12	8.08
Ally is being too protective on Maddie, confronting her school principal, teacher and classmates. She decides to hire a nanny, but can not find one to fit her standards, so she hires Victor, who has developed a good bond with Maddie. Ally is offered partnership on the firm since John left. Ally discovers the firm is losing money and has to fire an employee. Coretta and Raymond face each other in court on a case about a lawyer fired because she was dying from AIDS.
103	13	"Woman"	Jeannot Szwarc	David E. Kelley	February 18, 2002	5M13	8.77
Ally fires Jenny, causing Glenn to quit. Glenn and Jenny decide to start a new firm together and leave Cage, Fish & McBeal. Ally wants Nelle to be nicer and asks her to perform at the bar. Claire Otoms wants legal representation because she was fired for sexual harassment from her firm. Richard decides to hire her as an office assistant. Maddie starts asking questions about sex and insists Ally and Victor demonstrate a french kiss.
104	14	"Homecoming"	Billy Dickson	Story by : David E. Kelley & Constance M. Burge & Roberto Benabib; Teleplay by : David E. Kelley	February 25, 2002	5M14	10.48
Ally takes the DNA test after recurring dreams where Maddie's real parents show up. Maddie escapes to New York City to see her aunt. A demented woman shows at Ally's door looking for Vincent, the love of her life who owned the house before Ally. Ally offers Raymond a job at the firm, which he takes. Claire decides to help Richard reunite with his high school crush, but she had a sex change operation and is now a man.
105	15	"Heart and Soul"	Steve Gomer	David E. Kelley	March 4, 2002	5M15	9.10
Richard and Raymond are hired to represent Serena Feldman, a 16-year-old girl who will die unless Judge Hall consents to a heart transplant from her convicted father, her only match. After Judge Hall denies the transplant, Serena's father escapes and kills himself. Maddie is caught smoking and reveals to Victor that she wanted to be suspended to avoid father-daughter day at school.
106	16	"Love Is All Around"	Arlene Sanford	Story by : David E. Kelley & Constance M. Burge & Roberto Benabib & Cindy Lichtman; Teleplay by : David E. Kelley	April 15, 2002	5M16	8.12
107	17	"Love Is All Around"	Arlene Sanford	Story by : David E. Kelley & Constance M. Burge & Roberto Benabib & Cindy Lichtman; Teleplay by : David E. Kelley	April 15, 2002	5M17	8.12
Ally is about to go on her 3rd date, a.k.a. the "sex date", with Victor. Ally is interviewing for new hires, and meets with big shot attorney Todd Merrick (Special Guest Star Matthew Perry). When Ally and Victor come home, they find Maddie's nanny dead in front of the TV, ruining the rest of the date. Richard assigns Nelle opposite court devil Liza "Lolita" Bump, a bitchy, young and feared attorney; so feared that Richard has to get John Cage for the case. Claire announces she is getting married, and Coretta suggests she sign a pre-nup. The judge forbids the lawyers to interfere in Claire's engagement and her fiancée decides to call off the wedding. Ally is still shaken with the memory of Larry and is not sure of her feelings for Victor. John and Nelle try to settle upon their imminent loss in court but Liza has now lowered her offer. John is furious and decides to take her down.
108	18	"Tom Dooley"	Sarah Pia Anderson	David E. Kelley	April 22, 2002	5M18	8.14
Ally is going to the Bermudas with Victor and welcomes Liza as the firm's newest attorney. Liza hires another lawyer, Wilson Jade, whom she was going to partner with on her own practice. Nelle and Wilson represent a woman who is suing her husband for sexual harassment, while John and Liza represent Nicole Naples (Special Guest Star Heather Locklear), a woman legally married to two different men. Liza and John develop a great chemistry in court and save Nicole from going to jail. Claire is hot for Wilson, who makes an excellent settlement on the case with the help of Nelle.
109	19	"Another One Bites the Dust"	Kenny Ortega	Story by : David E. Kelley & Constance M. Burge & Roberto Benabib; Teleplay by : David E. Kelley	April 29, 2002	5M19	7.71
Ally and Victor return from their Bermuda trip. Ally feels their relationship is in crisis because they were not able to connect without Maddie. Victor is being sued by his former girlfriend for breach of contract. Nelle and Wilson team up against a woman blackmailing their client to come public with a tape of their lovemaking. Richard obsesses over Liza and has Claire talk for him through a hearing device.
110	20	"What I'll Never Do for Love Again" "Reality Bites"	Billy Dickson	David E. Kelley	May 6, 2002	5M20	8.78
Elaine auditions for A Chorus Line, but does not get a call back. She accidentally bumps into the casting director, they go out for dinner and end up having sex. Richard's father is being sued by his former secretary for sexual harassment. He fired her because he was falling in love with her, damaging his 40 year marriage.
111	21	"All of Me"	Bethany Rooney	David E. Kelley & Peter MacNicol	May 13, 2002	5M21	8.00
The lawyers at Cage, Fish & McBeal split when dual personalities of the same woman hires them to represent each in court. One of her personalities is a strong, decided and bitchy woman that goes by Helena Green. She wants to divorce her husband, who years ago married sweet, warm-hearted Helen Green. Helena has Liza and Richard on her side, a couple struggling with the imminent commitment; while Helen hires Ally and John.
112	22	"Bygones"	Bill D'Elia	David E. Kelley	May 20, 2002	5M22	11.51
Ally discovers Maddie is suffering from a nervous reaction to all the changes in her life after she passes out. Ally decides the only way she can help her daughter is to move back to New York City. While spending her last hours in the city, Ally gets a visit from Renee, Georgia, and Billy as a ghost.
