= Nelle Porter =

Character from Ally McBeal

- Ally McBeal character
- First appearance: "The Real World"
- Last appearance: "Bygones"
- Portrayed by: Portia de Rossi

In-universe information
- Occupation: Associate attorney, Cage & Fish
- Nationality: American

Nelle Porter is a fictional character on the Fox television show Ally McBeal. She is portrayed by actress Portia de Rossi and appears in Seasons 2 through to Season 5 of the show. A Boston-based lawyer, Nelle joins the fictional law firm of Cage & Fish with the ambition of someday becoming a partner. Romantically involved with partner John Cage during Seasons 2 and 3, she appears in future Seasons mainly as a source of comic relief. She is also notable for her close friendship with Ling Woo, one of the show's most remarked-upon characters.

== Background ==
Nelle Porter is introduced in the Season 2 premiere as a young lawyer, known both for her skills as a litigator and for her cold demeanor (hence her nickname, "Sub-Zero Nelle"). Richard Fish brings her in to the firm as a rainmaker, with promises that she will be the first associate to be made partner. Though Fish is the main force behind bringing her into the firm (amid the protests of the associates), it is John Cage who immediately becomes “drawn to her” romantically. Nelle begins dating John early on in the season. Their relationship struggles mostly due to John's cautious reluctance to go on dates anywhere other than the bar on the ground floor of the building that also houses their firm. John is also initially somewhat insecure in the relationship, as he believes Nelle's gorgeous looks place her out of his league, romantically speaking. Later, Nelle must deal with insecurities of her own when she begins to feel that their coworker Ally McBeal might be a better match for John than she is. Another early bump in their relationship occurs after Nelle's fear of frogs inadvertently results in her putting John's tree frog, Stefan, into a coma.

Nelle is initially treated with hostility by the firm's other female employees, particularly fellow associate Georgia Thomas and Ally's secretary, Elaine Vassal. The main focus of this is jealousy of her courtroom skills, as well as her attractiveness. Her perfect blonde hair, for example, becomes a running gag on the show and a source of envy to the other women. Nelle's character is also known early on for introducing her client Ling Woo to the firm. Ling is also a close friend of Nelle's, and the two are seen interacting socially outside of work both before and after Ling herself joins the firm as an associate. Nelle is the only member of the firm other than Richard Fish who seems pleased by Ling's addition to the staff.

Nelle's relationship with John hits a major roadblock when she reveals that she has no desire to ever be a parent, which is a role John very much wishes to fill someday. Their relationship ultimately begins to break down in Season 3, however, when John discovers Nelle's elitist tendencies and comes to view her as a snob. Their eventual break-up results in a great deal of workplace hostility between Nelle and John, which is only amplified when Richard reveals that he and John do not intend to honor their promise to make Nelle a partner. In retaliation, Nelle begins poaching clients from Cage & Fish with the intention of starting her own firm. Though her plan goes off without a hitch, she almost immediately returns to Cage & Fish out of guilt and because she misses working at the firm. She also mends fences with John and admits that the real reason she broke up with him is that she felt that he loved Ally in a way that he never loved her.

Nelle has more of a background role in Season 4, though she does have a few notable storylines. She briefly dates fellow attorney Larry Paul, though he quickly chooses to instead cultivate a romantic relationship with Ally. Shortly thereafter, she enters a charity auction on the firm's behalf and is obligated to go on a date with Dr. Greg Barrett, the man who places the winning bid on her. Though she initially acts dismissively towards Greg, she agrees to spend the day with him and in that brief time develops uncharacteristic, passionate, romantic feelings for him in spite of herself. In the end, she learns that he has been convicted of murder after compassionately performing euthanasia on a terminally ill ALS patient. Their day together is his final day of freedom, as he is due to be formally sentenced and to begin serving a life sentence in prison the following morning. Nelle watches tearfully the following day as Greg is taken away to serve his sentence. During this season, she also mends fences with John when she implores him to help her try her father's case, after Mr. Porter is discharged from his job as a teacher for claiming to be Santa Claus. Nelle must ultimately face the fact that his delusion is connected with his distant relationship with her, and she begins to work toward making him a bigger part of her life.

Nelle's relatively minor role continues in Season 5. She watches with amusement as chance transforms Ling from Cage & Fish associate to judge presiding over a television courtroom procedural. When John Cage disappears unexpectedly while struggling with his unrequited romantic feelings for Ally, Nelle expresses considerable concern for his well-being. After Ally is promoted to partner, Nelle initially reacts with jealousy, but Ally is quick to put her in her place. She later learns from Ally that she is the firm's most lucrative associate and complies, to an extent, with Ally's request that she become more sociable and friendly with her co-workers. This may be in part responsible for Nelle's finally establishing a bond with Elaine. Despite their largely antagonistic relationship throughout the show, Nelle helps her attempt to pursue her dreams of becoming a Broadway star. Nelle shares her co-workers’ skepticism when Richard Fish decides to marry new associate Liza Bump, with whom she has a hostile relationship. Liza is responsible for revealing Nelle's secret that her birth name is actually “Morgan.” The marriage, however, appears to create something of a truce between Nelle and Liza. Nelle also displays a degree of chemistry with fellow associate Wilson Jade, who is hired by Liza on her first day at Cage & Fish. The show ends, however, before anything serious develops between them. In the series finale, Nelle attempts to remain nonchalant when Ally decides to leave the firm for the sake of her daughter Madison, but nevertheless is shown to be tearful when Ally departs for New York City.

== Character ==
Nelle is portrayed as an ambitious and confident young woman. Though well aware of her own beauty, she prefers to succeed based on her intelligence and merits as a litigator. She displays a sarcastic sense of humor and is a frequent source of biting, witty one-liners. Nelle's nickname before joining Cage & Fish is “subzero,” as she is not known for her warmth as a person. Though her friend Ling's viciousness is more commonly remarked upon, Nelle shares the same quality and can also be vindictive, if on a lesser scale. These traits come to the forefront in Season 3, both following her break-up with John Cage and during her attempt to start her own firm. Nelle is primarily a career-oriented woman and is somewhat unusual among the show's female characters in that she expresses no desire to ever be a mother. She also has no serious long-term romantic relationships after Cage, both because she prefers to focus on work and because she dislikes sex. A softer side of Nelle can be seen on occasion, particularly during her relationship with Cage and in her friendship with her sole confidant, Ling, but also at various other points throughout the show. Ally herself notes in the series finale that Nelle has “a big heart,” but Nelle seems reluctant to expose it for fear of vulnerability.
