= Who Is Cletis Tout? =

2002 film

Who is Cletis Tout?
- Theatrical release poster
- Directed by: Chris Ver Wiel
- Written by: Chris Ver Wiel
- Produced by: Matthew Grimaldi; Robert Snukal; Daniel Grodnick
- Starring: Christian Slater; Richard Dreyfuss; Portia de Rossi; Tim Allen; RuPaul; Billy Connolly
- Cinematography: Jerzy Zieliński
- Edited by: Roger Bondelli
- Music by: Randy Edelman
- Production companies: Fireworks Entertainment; Seven Arts Pictures
- Distributed by: Paramount Classics
- Release dates: September 12, 2001 (Toronto International Film Festival); July 26, 2002 (United States)
- Running time: 92 minutes
- Countries: United States; Canada
- Language: English
- Budget: $9 million
- Box office: $252,706

Who Is Cletis Tout? is a 2001 crime comedy film written and directed by Chris Ver Wiel and starring Christian Slater, Richard Dreyfuss, Portia de Rossi, RuPaul, and Tim Allen. The film is about mistaken identity getting in the way of recovering a stash of diamonds that was stolen and subsequently hidden more than 20 years earlier.

Who Is Cletis Tout? premiered at the Toronto International Film Festival on September 12, 2001 and was released by Paramount Classics on July 26, 2002. The film received negative reviews from critics and grossed $252,706 against a $9 million budget.

== Plot ==
The film is told primarily in flashback, as the film first follows a hitman, Critical Jim, who follows and holds at gunpoint a man he believes is Cletis Tout - but who actually is Finch. Because Critical Jim is so fond of film noir and other classic films (such as Casablanca and Breakfast at Tiffany's), he's willing to listen to Finch as he tells his story, imagining it as a film in progress. Finch obliges, explaining how he got to be mistaken for Cletis Tout.

Finch happened to be in the same jail with Micah, who stole diamonds more than 20 years before, then hid the diamonds and soon landed in prison. With Finch's help, Micah manages to break out, and the two get new identities for themselves, courtesy of a coroner who owes Finch a favor.

The problem is that Finch's new identity is that of Cletis Tout, a photojournalist who managed to film Rowdy Virago, a Mafia figure's son, strangling a woman. The head of the Mafia gets his men to kill Tout (which is how the coroner got the identity for Finch), but when Finch goes to Tout's apartment to look for his passport, a neighbor calls the police, who inform the mafia head that Cletis Tout is still alive.

After Micah meets up with his now grown-up daughter, Tess, he's accidentally shot by the men sent to kill Cletis. Just before dying, Micah gets Finch to promise to watch after his daughter, and thus Tess and Finch begin an uneasy relationship as they look for the diamonds. Meanwhile, the Mafia head decides to bring in a professional hit man, so he contacts Critical Jim to finish the job. Critical Jim is more interested in where Finch's story will end - specifically, if he'll be able to reconcile with Tess in the end, giving the story a perfect Hollywood ending.

In the end, Rowdy is arrested and Critical Jim helps Finch reunite with Tess, killing those who are after Finch. Critical Jim then walks away, dancing in homage to Singin' in the Rain.

== Cast ==
- Christian Slater as Trevor Allen Finch
- Richard Dreyfuss as Micah Tobias
  - Tim Progosh as Young Micah Tobias
- Portia de Rossi as Tess Donnelly
  - Rachel Grodnik as Young Tess Donnelly
- Tim Allen as Critical Jim
- Peter MacNeil as Detective Tripp
- Shawn Doyle as Crow Gollotti
- Louis Di Bianco as Nimble
- Tony Nappo as Fife
- Bill MacDonald as Detective Delaney
- Richard Chevolleau as Detective Horst
- Elias Zarou as Detective Rafferty
- RuPaul as Ginger Markum
- Billy Connolly as Dr. Savian
- Danny Lima as Cletis Tout

== Release and reception ==
The film was scheduled to debut at the Toronto International Film Festival in mid-September 2001, but the showing was canceled because of the September 11 attacks. The film was shelved for nearly a year, finally appearing in July–August 2002 in only 18 theaters. It was considered a box office bomb, grossing $252,706 from a $9 million budget.

On Rotten Tomatoes the film holds a 23% rating based on reviews from 56 critics. The site's consensus is: "Clichéd and endlessly self-referential, Who is Cletis Tout? doesn't add anything original to the crime genre." On Metacritic the film has a score of 36% based on reviews from 20 critics, indicating "generally unfavorable reviews".

Kevin Thomas of Los Angeles Times was positive and upbeat, saying that the film was "a gem of a romantic crime comedy that turns out to be clever, amusing and unpredictable." Thomas praised the "retro feeling" of the Toronto locale, and "some fresh ideas" shown by writer/director Chris Ver Wiel. Syndicated film critic Stephen Whitty was wholly negative, asking "why did this film get made? Why did these stars sign on for it? Why is it darkening our theaters now?" Whitty gave the film a D grade.

== Remake ==
There is a Bollywood remake entitled Anthony Kaun Hai (Who is Anthony?) starring Arshad Warsi, Sanjay Dutt, and Minissha Lamba.
