= Ally McBeal (character) =

Fictional American TV character, introduced 1997

- Ally McBeal character
- First appearance: "Pilot"
- Last appearance: "Bygones"
- Portrayed by: Calista Flockhart

In-universe information
- Full name: Allison Marie McBeal
- Occupation: Litigator; Administrative partner: Cage, Fish & McBeal
- Family: George McBeal (father); Jeannie McBeal (mother)
- Children: Madison "Maddie" Harrington (daughter)
- Nationality: American
- Birth date: March 20, 1970 (Alternatively, April 1970 as S03E08 ("Turning 30") shows an April 2000 calendar)

Allison Marie McBeal is the central fictional character in the Fox series Ally McBeal played by Calista Flockhart.

Ally McBeal is a Boston-based lawyer. She is a woman who believes in love and is continually looking for her soul mate. She often hears songs in her head and experiences hallucinations, mostly of a dancing baby, due to her biological clock ticking. She also imagines sexual endeavors with various men.

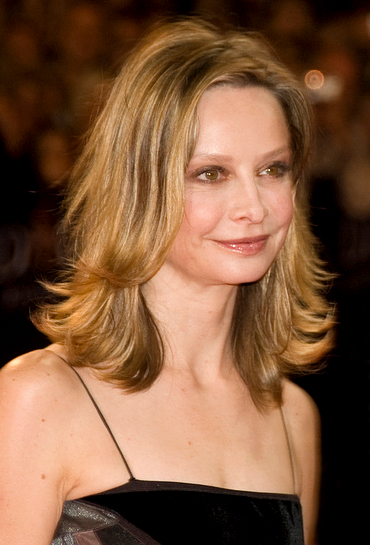
Calista Flockhart portrays Ally McBeal

== Background ==
Ally McBeal is the daughter of George McBeal (played by James Naughton), also a lawyer, and Jeannie McBeal (played by Jill Clayburgh). She has one sister and one brother although neither are ever seen in the series. She had a sister who died at the age of six.

Ally McBeal attended Harvard Law School to be with her childhood sweetheart Billy Thomas (played by Gil Bellows). Billy left Harvard halfway to attend University of Michigan Law School, breaking Ally's heart. After law school, Ally is roommates with district attorney Renée Radick, and working for an unnamed Boston law firm.

Ally shortly resigns from that firm due to her boss sexually harassing her. Old classmate Richard Fish meets her on the street and then recruits her to join his newly-established law firm, Cage & Fish. To her surprise, she learns that Billy is also working at Cage & Fish. Ally is also shocked that Billy is married to lawyer and University of Michigan alumna, Georgia. Ally falls in love with him again, to the horror of Georgia. Yet, Ally and Georgia rapidly become friends and learn how to collaborate with Billy.

Throughout the first season, Ally dates many men. However, because Billy has always been the main love of her life, no relationship became serious until she met Dr. Greg Butters (played by Jesse L. Martin). Greg and Ally's relationship grew quite serious until Greg spotted Ally and Billy kissing. Billy felt so jealous of Ally's relationship resulting in him declaring his undying love for her. The two of them subsequently engaged in a short affair, which Ally finally broke off. As a result, Greg broke off the relationship after finding out about Ally's actions.

The third season began with Ally engaging in sex with a guy at a car wash, however, it later turned out that he is the fiancée of a client, whom Ally subsequently announces during their wedding day. Later, Billy discovered he has a brain tumor, and again grows closer to Ally. However, Billy dies in Ally's arms in court after giving a passionate closing describing his life - although in reality he is hallucinating and describing the life he wished he had shared with Ally. When Georgia later asks Ally if Billy had said anything before he died, the latter lies to her in order to spare Georgia's feelings. Ally starts dating again towards the end of that season, meeting a British lawyer named Brian Selig (played by Tim Dutton). The two have a six-month relationship. After six months, Brian asked Ally to move in with him, Ally realizes Brian was much too boring for her and then breaks off the relationship.

Shortly after, Ally falls in love with another lawyer Larry Paul (played by Robert Downey Jr.). They initially met when she walked into his office and spent much time talking about her issues before she discovered he was a lawyer and a therapist. The two started a serious but rocky relationship. Although initially troubled by the fact that Larry had an ex-wife with whom he was still close and an ex-girlfriend (played by Famke Janssen) who was also the mother of his child, it was soon evident that Larry was her soulmate. The two agreed to take the relationship long-distance between Detroit and Boston when Larry's son attempted to sue his father, met Ally and told her he missed his dad. Ally then encouraged Larry to move back to Detroit to be in his son's life. Larry agreed and the two parted with the understanding that the relationship would remain and that each would visit the other until such a time that Ally was ready to move to Detroit. Being unable to say goodbye in person, he left a note pinned to a snowman outside Ally's door that said, "I will be back." Initially Ally was supposed to marry Larry at the end of the fourth season, but when Downey was arrested on drug-related charges and sent to jail, the network fired him, canceling the marriage storyline.

In the fifth and final season it was revealed that while in college, Ally, in need of money, donated an egg for research. However, the egg was fertilized and one day a girl named Maddie (played by Hayden Panettiere) shows up on her doorstep, claiming to be her daughter, prompting Ally to faint. She gets to know her daughter over the course of several episodes. Her most significant love interest in this final season was Victor Morrison (played by Jon Bon Jovi) but the relationship deteriorated quite quickly as it was evident that Ally had thoughts for Larry. Subsequently, her daughter is harassed by schoolmates and suffers a shock, so Ally prioritizes her child over quest for love and decides to move to her daughter's home city of New York City.

== Reception ==
In 2004, Ally was ranked number 75 in Bravo's list of The 100 Greatest TV Characters. In June 2010, Entertainment Weekly named her one of the "100 Greatest Characters of the Last 20 Years". She was also listed in AOL's 100 Most Memorable Female TV Characters. For role, Flockhart was nominated for a Golden Globe Award for Best Actress – Television Series Musical or Comedy five times, winning in 1998 and was nominated for a Primetime Emmy Award for Outstanding Lead Actress in a Comedy Series three times.

Troy Patterson of Entertainment Weekly argued that Ally McBeal has similarities to Scarlett O'Hara of Gone with the Wind and that "Scarlett and Ally are fairy-tale princesses who bear about as much resemblance to real women as Barbie and Skipper." Patterson wrote that Ally is similar because she is also a child from a ruling class family, "pines hopelessly after an unavailable dreamboat", and has a "sassy black roommate" in place of a "mammy" to "comfort her".

Numerous contemporaneous culture critics opined that even as a fictional character she was demeaning to women, specifically professional women, because of her perceived flightiness, lack of demonstrated legal knowledge, short skirts, and extreme emotional instability. Perhaps the most notorious example of the debate sparked by the show was on June 25, 1998, cover story of Time magazine, which juxtaposed McBeal with three pioneering feminists (Susan B. Anthony, Betty Friedan, Gloria Steinem) and asked "Is Feminism Dead?".
