= Ally McBeal =

1997 American legal comedy-drama television series

- Genre: Comedy drama; Cringe comedy; Legal drama; Surreal comedy
- Created by: David E. Kelley
- Starring: Calista Flockhart; Courtney Thorne-Smith; Greg Germann; Lisa Nicole Carson; Jane Krakowski; Gil Bellows; Peter MacNicol; Vonda Shepard; Portia de Rossi; Lucy Liu; James LeGros; Robert Downey Jr.; Regina Hall; Julianne Nicholson; James Marsden; Josh Hopkins; Hayden Panettiere
- Theme music composer: Vonda Shepard
- Opening theme: "Searchin' My Soul"
- Composers: Danny Lux; Vonda Shepard
- Country of origin: United States
- Original language: English
- No. of seasons: 5
- No. of episodes: 112 (list of episodes)

Production
- Executive producers: David E. Kelley; Bill D'Elia
- Producers: Kayla Alpert (2000–01); Kim Hamberg (1998–2002); Mike Listo (1997–2000); Jack Philbrick (2000–02); Steve Robin (1997–2002); Pamela J. Wisne (1997–2002)
- Cinematography: Thomas F. Denove; Billy Dickson; David A. Harp; Tim Suhrstedt
- Camera setup: Single-camera
- Running time: 45–48 minutes
- Production companies: David E. Kelley Productions; 20th Century Fox Television

Original release
- Network: Fox
- Release: September 8, 1997 – May 20, 2002

Ally McBeal is an American legal comedy-drama television series created by David E. Kelley that originally aired on Fox from September 8, 1997, to May 20, 2002. It revolves around Calista Flockhart in the title role as a lawyer working in the Boston law firm Cage & Fish. Although the series is ostensibly a legal drama, its main focus is the romantic and personal lives of the main characters. The series was produced by David E. Kelley Productions and 20th Century Fox Television, with Kelley serving as executive producer alongside Bill D'Elia. Ally McBeal received critical acclaim in its early seasons, winning the Golden Globe Award for Best Television Series – Musical or Comedy in 1998 and 1999, and also winning the Emmy Award for Outstanding Comedy Series in 1999.

== Overview ==
Allison Marie "Ally" McBeal begins working at the Boston law firm Cage & Fish, co-owned by her law school classmate Richard Fish (Greg Germann). She left her previous firm due to sexual harassment. On her first day, Ally is dismayed to discover that she will be working alongside her ex-boyfriend Billy Thomas (Gil Bellows)—whom she has never gotten over. Even worse, Billy is now married to fellow lawyer Georgia (Courtney Thorne-Smith), who later joins Cage & Fish. The triangle among the three forms the basis for the main plot for the show's first three seasons.

Although Ally McBeal is ostensibly a legal drama, the main focus of the series is the romantic and personal lives of the main characters, often using legal proceedings as plot devices to contrast or reinforce a character's drama. For example, bitter divorce litigation of a client might provide a backdrop for Ally's decision to break up with a boyfriend. Legal arguments were also frequently used to explore multiple sides of various social issues.

Cage & Fish (which becomes Cage/Fish & McBeal; Cage, Fish, & Associates towards the end of the series), the law firm where most of the characters work, is depicted as a highly sexualized environment symbolized by its unisex restroom. Lawyers and secretaries in the firm routinely date, flirt with, or have a romantic history with one another and frequently run into former or potential romantic interests in the courtroom or on the street.

The series had many offbeat and frequently surreal running gags and themes, such as Ally's tendency to immediately fall over whenever she met somebody she found attractive, Richard Fish's wattle fetish and humorous mottos ("Fishisms" and "Bygones"), John's gymnastic dismounts out of the office's unisex bathroom stalls, or the dancing twins (played by Eric and Steve Cohen) at a frequented bar. The show uses vivid, dramatic fantasy sequences for Ally's and other characters' wishful thinking; of particular note is the early internet sensation, the dancing baby.

The series also featured regular visits to a local bar where singer Vonda Shepard regularly performed (though occasionally handing over the microphone to the characters). Star contemporary singers also performed in the bar at the end of the shows, including acts such as Mariah Carey, Barry White and Anastacia. The series also took place in the same continuity as David E. Kelley's legal drama The Practice (which aired on ABC), as the two shows crossed over with one another on occasion, a rare occurrence for two shows that aired on different networks.

Ultimately, in the series finale "Bygones", Ally leaves Cage & Fish and relocates to New York City.

== Cast ==
Cast of season 4 (from left): (top) Liu, Downey, Krakowski, Germann, MacNicol; (middle) Carson, de Rossi, Flockhart; (bottom) Shepard, LeGros

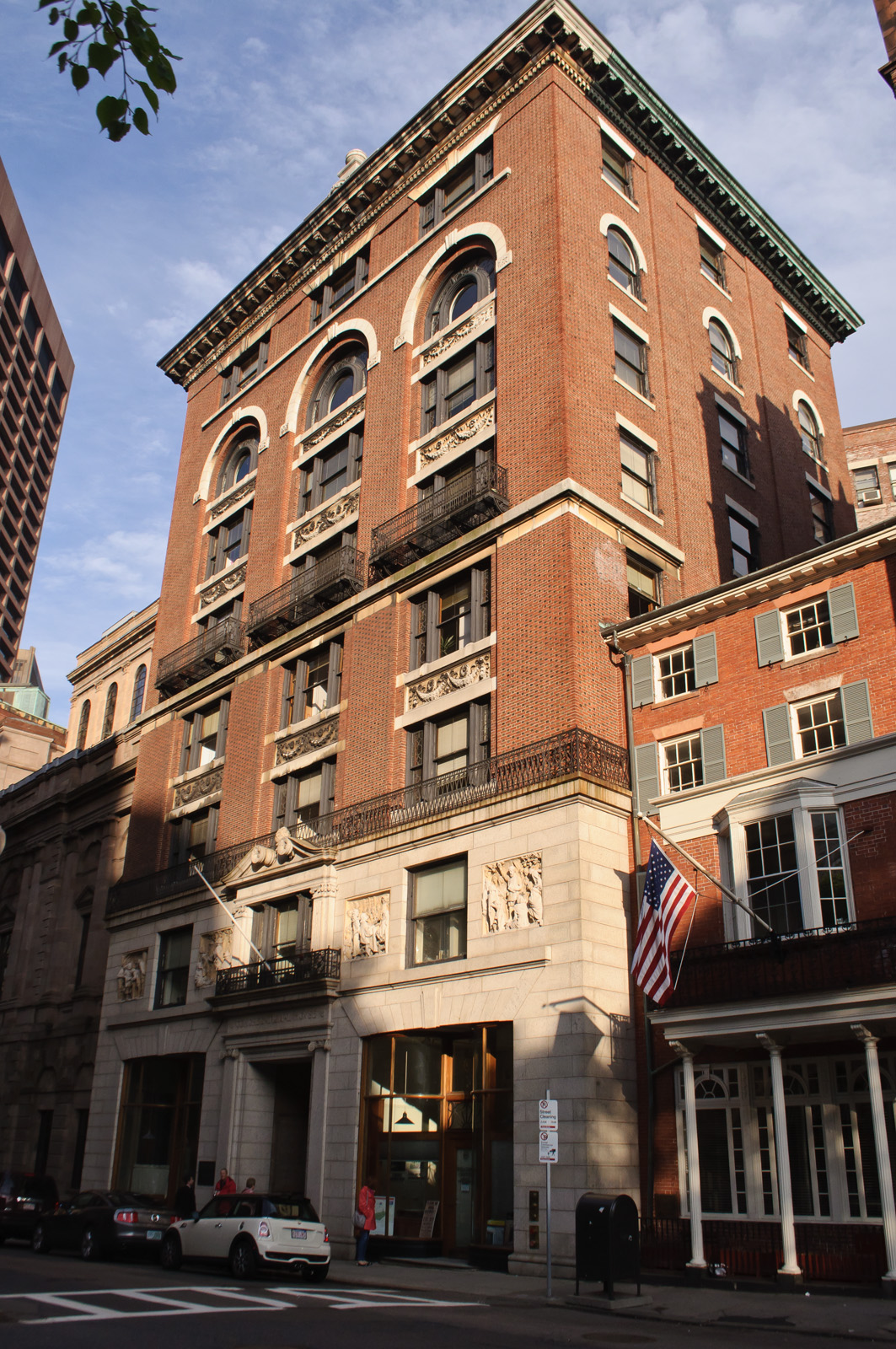
14 Beacon Street in Boston, the exterior of which was used as the location for the law firm "Cage & Fish" (later "Cage, Fish, & McBeal"), which was located on the 7th floor of this building

List of main Ally McBeal characters, with actors, by season
Actor	Character	Seasons				
Actor	Character	1	2	3	4	5
Calista Flockhart	Ally McBeal	Main	Main	Main	Main	Main
Courtney Thorne-Smith	Georgia Thomas	Main	Main	Main	Guest	Guest
Greg Germann	Richard Fish	Main	Main	Main	Main	Main
Lisa Nicole Carson	Renée Raddick	Main	Main	Main	Main	Guest
Jane Krakowski	Elaine Vassal	Main	Main	Main	Main	Main
Gil Bellows	Billy Allen Thomas	Main	Main	Main	Guest	Guest
Peter MacNicol	John Cage	Main	Main	Main	Main	Recurring
Vonda Shepard	Herself	Recurring	Main	Main	Main	Main
Portia de Rossi	Nelle Porter	—N/a	Main	Main	Main	Main
Lucy Liu	Ling Woo	—N/a	Main	Main	Main	Recurring
James LeGros	Mark Albert	—N/a	—N/a	Recurring	Main	—N/a
Robert Downey Jr.	Larry Paul	—N/a	—N/a	—N/a	Main	Guest
Regina Hall	Coretta Lipp	—N/a	—N/a	—N/a	Recurring	Main
Julianne Nicholson	Jenny Shaw	—N/a	—N/a	—N/a	—N/a	Main
James Marsden	Glenn Foy	—N/a	—N/a	—N/a	—N/a	Main
Josh Hopkins	Raymond Millbury	—N/a	—N/a	—N/a	—N/a	Main
Hayden Panettiere	Maddie Harrington	—N/a	—N/a	—N/a	—N/a	Main

=== Recurring ===
- Dyan Cannon as Jennifer "Whipper" Cone (Seasons 1–3)
- Phil Leeds as Judge Dennis "Happy" Boyle (Seasons 1–2)
- Jennifer Holliday as Lisa Knowles (Seasons 1–4)
- Harrison Page as Reverend Mark Newman (Seasons 1–4)
- Lee Wilkof as District Attorney Nixon (Seasons 1–2, 5)
- Jesse L. Martin as Dr. Greg Butters (Seasons 1–2)
- Tracey Ullman as Dr. Tracey Clarke (Seasons 1–3)
- Albert Hall as Judge Seymore Walsh (Seasons 1–5)
- Gerry Becker as Attorney Myron Stone (Seasons 2–4)
- Amy Castle as Young Ally (Seasons 2–3)
- Gina Philips as Sandy Hingle (Season 3)
- Tim Dutton as Brian Selig (Seasons 3–4)
- Lisa Edelstein as Cindy McCauliff (Season 4)
- Christopher Neiman as Attorney Barry Mathers (Seasons 4–5)
- Jami Gertz as Kimmy Bishop (Seasons 4–5)
- John Michael Higgins as Steven Milter (Seasons 4–5)
- Anne Heche as Melanie West (Season 4)
- Taye Diggs as Jackson Duper (Season 4)
- Barry Humphries as Claire Otoms (Season 5)
- Jon Bon Jovi as Victor Morrison (Season 5)
- Christina Ricci as Liza Bump (Season 5)
- Bobby Cannavale as Wilson Jade (Season 5)

== Episodes ==
Season	Episodes	Originally released		Rank	Rating
Season	Episodes	First released	Last released	Rank	Rating
1	23	September 8, 1997	May 18, 1998	57	8.1
2	23	September 14, 1998	May 24, 1999	23	9.6
3	21	October 25, 1999	May 22, 2000	39	8.5
4	23	October 23, 2000	May 21, 2001	—N/a	—N/a
5	22	October 29, 2001	May 20, 2002	—N/a	—N/a

In Australia, Ally McBeal was aired by the Seven Network from 24 August 1998 to 2002. In 2010, it was aired repeatedly by Network 10.

In the UK, Ally McBeal was aired by Channel 4, premiering on June 3, 1998, and concluding on October 30, 2002. It began airing for free on Channel 4's streaming service on August 30, 2024.

=== Crossovers with The Practice ===
Seymore Walsh, a stern judge often exasperated by the eccentricities of the Cage & Fish lawyers and played by actor Albert Hall, was also a recurring character on The Practice. In addition, Judge Jennifer (Whipper) Cone appears on The Practice episode "Line of Duty" (S02 E15), while Judge Roberta Kittelson, a recurring character on The Practice, has a featured guest role in the Ally McBeal episode "Do you Wanna Dance?"

Most of the primary Practice cast members guest starred in the Ally McBeal episode "The Inmates" (S01 E20), in a storyline that concluded with the Practice episode "Axe Murderer" (S02 E26), featuring Calista Flockhart and Gil Bellows reprising their Ally characters. Unusually for a TV crossover, Ally McBeal and The Practice aired on different networks. Bobby Donnell, the main character of The Practice played by Dylan McDermott, was featured heavily in both this crossover and another Ally McBeal episode, "These are the Days".

Regular Practice cast members Lara Flynn Boyle and Michael Badalucco each had an uncredited cameo as their characters in Ally McBeal (Boyle as a woman who trades insults with Ally in the episode "Making Spirits Bright" and Badalucco as one of Ally's dates in the episode "I Know him by Heart").

In Season 5, Lara Flynn Boyle had an uncredited guest appearance as a rebuttal witness opposite guest star Heather Locklear's character in the episode, "Tom Dooley".

== Filming location ==
14 Beacon Street in Boston was the exterior which was used as the location for the law firm "Cage & Fish" (later "Cage, Fish, & McBeal"), which was located on the 7th floor of this building.

== Reception ==
Upon premiering in 1997, the show was an instant hit, averaging around 11 million viewers per episode. The show's second season saw an increase in ratings and soon became a top 20 show, averaging around 13 million viewers per episode. The show's ratings began to decline in the third season, but stabilized in the fourth season after Robert Downey Jr. joined the regular cast as Ally's boyfriend Larry Paul, and a fresher aesthetic was created by new art director Matthew DeCoste. However, Downey's character was written out after the end of the season due to Downey's troubles with drug addiction.

The first two seasons, as well as the fourth, remain the most critically acclaimed and saw the most awards success at the Emmys, SAG Awards and the Golden Globes. In 2007, Ally McBeal placed #48 on Entertainment Weekly's 2007 "New TV Classics" list.

== Ratings ==
US viewer ratings for Ally McBeal, by season
Season		Number of viewers	Network	Rank
1	1997–98	11.4 million	Fox	#59
2	1998–99	13.8 million	Fox	#20
3	1999–2000	12.4 million	Fox	#35
4	2000–01	12.0 million	Fox	#40
5	2001–02	9.4 million	Fox	#65

== Cancellation ==
Fox canceled Ally McBeal after five seasons. In addition to being the lowest-rated season of Ally McBeal and the grounds for the show's cancellation, the fifth season was also the only season of the show that failed to win any Emmy or Golden Globe awards.

== Feminist criticism ==
Ally McBeal received some criticism from TV critics and feminists who found the title character annoying and demeaning to women (specifically regarding professional women) because of her perceived flightiness, lack of demonstrated legal knowledge, short skirts, and emotional instability. Perhaps the most notorious example of the debate sparked by the show was the June 29, 1998, cover story of Time magazine, which juxtaposed the character of Ally McBeal with three real-life pioneering feminists (Susan B. Anthony, Betty Friedan, Gloria Steinem) and asked "Is Feminism Dead?" In the January 18, 1999 Ally McBeal episode, "Love Unlimited", Ally talks to her co-worker John Cage about a dream she had, saying "You know, I had a dream that they put my face on the cover of Time magazine as 'the face of feminism'."

== Music ==
Music was a prominent feature of Ally McBeal. Vonda Shepard, a relatively unknown musician at the time, performed regularly on the show and her song "Searchin' My Soul" was the show's theme song. Many of the songs Shepard performed were established hits with lyrics that paralleled the events of each episode, for example, "Both Sides Now", "Hooked on a Feeling" and "Tell Him". Besides recording background music for the show, Shepard frequently appeared at the ends of episodes as a musician performing at a local piano bar frequented by the main characters. On rare occasions, her character would have conventional dialogue. A portion of "Searchin' My Soul" was played at the beginning of each episode, but the song was never played in its entirety.

Several of the characters had a musical leitmotif that played when they appeared. John Cage's was "You're the First, the Last, My Everything", Ling Woo's was the Wicked Witch of the West theme from The Wizard of Oz, and Ally McBeal herself picked "Tell Him", when told by a psychiatrist that she needed a theme song in a Season 1 episode.

Due to the popularity of the show and Shepard's music, a soundtrack titled Songs from Ally McBeal was released in 1998, as well as a successor soundtrack titled Heart and Soul: New Songs from Ally McBeal in 1999. Two compilation albums from the show featuring Shepard were also released in 2000 and 2001. A Christmas album was also released under the title Ally McBeal: A Very Ally Christmas. The album received positive reviews, and Shephard's version of Kay Starr's Christmas song "(Everybody's Waitin' for) The Man with the Bag", received considerable airplay during the holiday season.

Other artists featured on the show include Barry White, Al Green, Gladys Knight, Tina Turner, Macy Gray, Gloria Gaynor, Chayanne, Barry Manilow, Anastacia, Elton John, Sting and Mariah Carey. Josh Groban played the role of Malcolm Wyatt in the May 2001 season finale, performing "You're Still You". The series creator, David E. Kelley, was impressed with Groban's performance at The Family Celebration event and based on the audience reaction to Groban's singing, Kelley created a character for him in that finale. The background score for the show was composed by Danny Lux.

Musical releases from Ally McBeal
Soundtrack name	Number of tracks	Release date
Songs from Ally McBeal	14	May 5, 1998
Heart and Soul: New Songs from Ally McBeal	14	November 9, 1999
Ally McBeal: A Very Ally Christmas	14	November 7, 2000
Ally McBeal: For Once in My Life	14	April 24, 2001
The Best of Ally McBeal	12	October 6, 2009

== Home media ==
Due to music licensing issues, none of the seasons of Ally McBeal were available on DVD in the United States until 2009, though the show had been available in Italy, Belgium, the Netherlands, Japan, Hong Kong, Portugal, Spain, France, Germany, the United Kingdom, Mexico, Taiwan, Australia, Brazil, and the Czech Republic with all the show's music intact since 2005. In the UK, Ireland, and Spain all seasons are available in a complete box set.

20th Century Fox released the complete first season on DVD in Region 1 on October 6, 2009. They also released a special complete series edition on the same day. Season 1 does not contain any special features, but the complete series set contains several bonus features, including featurettes, an all-new retrospective, the episode of The Practice in which Calista Flockhart guest-starred, and a bonus disc entitled "The Best of Ally McBeal Soundtrack." In addition, both releases contain all of the original music. Season 2 was released on April 6, 2010. Seasons 3, 4, and 5 were all released on October 5, 2010.

Home media releases of Ally McBeal, showing season numbers, with release dates
DVD name	No. episodes	Region 1	Region 2	Region 4
The Complete First Season	23	October 6, 2009	February 21, 2005	April 26, 2006
The Complete Second Season	23	April 6, 2010	February 21, 2005	April 26, 2006
The Complete Third Season	21	October 5, 2010	February 21, 2005	April 26, 2006
The Complete Fourth Season	23	October 5, 2010	May 9, 2005	April 26, 2006
The Complete Fifth and Final Season	22	October 5, 2010	May 9, 2005	April 26, 2006
The Complete Series	112	October 6, 2009	October 30, 2006	April 18, 2012

== Ally (1999) ==
In 1999, at the height of the show's popularity, a half-hour version titled Ally began airing in parallel with the main program. This version, designed in a sitcom format, used re-edited scenes from the main program, along with previously unseen footage. The intention was to further develop the plots in the comedy drama in a sitcom style. It also focused only on Ally's personal life, cutting all the courtroom plots. The repackaged show was canceled partway through its initial run. While 13 episodes of Ally were produced, only ten aired.

== Possible revival ==
In March 2021, it was reported that a revival as a limited series was in early development by 20th Television with Flockhart possibly returning.

In August 2022, it was reported that ABC was in early development of a sequel series with Karin Gist writing and executive producing. The series would follow a young Black woman out of law school who joins the law firm. Flockhart has been approached to both reprise her role and executive-produce.

Flockhart, Germann, MacNicol and Bellows reunited at the 2024 75th Primetime Emmy Awards in a choreographed dance to Barry White's "You're the First, the Last, My Everything" recreating the unisex bathroom from the series.

== In popular culture ==
In a third-season episode of the British comedy The Adam and Joe Show, the show was parodied as "Ally McSqueal" using soft toys.

A first season episode of the animated sitcom Futurama, "When Aliens Attack", centers on an invasion of Earth by the Omicronians precipitated by a signal loss during the climax of an episode of Single Female Lawyer, whose main character is Jenny McNeal.

In a fourth season episode of the show The Good Place, the Judge, played by Maya Rudolph, hands Ted Danson's character (Michael) a petition to reboot Ally McBeal, stating "everything else is getting rebooted."

In the 2021 film The Mauritanian, Guantanamo Bay detention camp detainee Mohamedou Ould Salahi says to an American judge "Even in Mauritania, we have watched Law & Order and Ally McBeal."

In a fourth season episode of the show Crazy Ex-Girlfriend, a lyric in the song "Don't Be a Lawyer", mentions the show "No one you work with looks like Ally McBeal".
