= Bill D'Elia =

American screenwriter, producer, director and actor

- Born: William D'Elia; Queens, New York, U.S.
- Education: Ithaca College (BA); William Paterson University (MA)
- Occupations: Screenwriter; Producer; Director; Actor
- Years active: 1989–present
- Spouse: Ellie Dombroski
- Children: Chris D'Elia; Matt D'Elia

William D'Elia is an American screenwriter, producer, director and actor.

== Life ==
D'Elia grew up in Queens, New York City, and is a second generation Italian-American. He graduated from Ithaca College, and earned a master's degree in communication arts from William Paterson University in 1972.

D'Elia has two sons with his wife, Ellie Dombroski: actor and comedian Chris D'Elia, and filmmaker Matt D'Elia.

== Career ==
In the 1980s, D'Elia was a director of television commercials. In 1989, he independently produced and directed the film The Feud, based on the 1983 novel by Thomas Berger. The film attracted the attention of Steven Bochco, who hired D'Elia to direct an episode of Doogie Howser, M.D.. D'Elia went on to direct episodes of numerous other television series including Northern Exposure, Glee, Chicago Hope, Ally McBeal, The Practice, Boston Legal, and The West Wing. D'Elia was an executive producer and a director of Chicago Hope, Boston Legal, Ally McBeal, Harry's Law, Monday Mornings, The Crazy Ones (all collaborations with David E. Kelley), and the Shonda Rhimes series How To Get Away With Murder. He also co-created the series Judging Amy. He is currently an executive producer and a director for the Disney+ series Big Shot starring John Stamos.

== Awards ==
D'Elia has been nominated for a total of eight Emmy Awards – four as director and four as executive producer: Chicago Hope (two for producing, one for directing); one for directing Ally McBeal; and two each for producing and directing Boston Legal.

== Filmography ==
=== Film ===
Year	Title	Functioned as			Notes
Year	Title	Director	Producer	Writer	Notes
1989	The Feud	Yes	Yes	Yes	
1995	Big Dreams & Broken Hearts: The Dottie West Story	Yes	No	No	Television film
1995	In the Name of Love: A Texas Tragedy	Yes	No	No	Television film
1996	The Tomorrow Man	Yes	No	No	Television film
2011	American Animal	No	Yes	No	

=== Television ===
Year	Title	Functioned as			Notes
Year	Title	Director	Producer	Writer	Notes
1992	Law & Order	Yes	No	No	"Forgiveness" (Season 3, Episode 3)
1991–1993	Doogie Howser, M.D.	Yes	No	No	"My Two Dads" (Season 2, Episode 18) "Double Doogie with Cheese" (Season 3, Episode 15) "Spell It 'M-A-N'" (Season 4, Episode 14)
1991–1993	Reasonable Doubts	Yes	No	No	"...and Sleep Won't Come" (Season 1, Episode 5) "Home Is Where the Heart Is" (Season 1, Episode 18) "Mercury in Retrograde" (Season 2, Episode 5) "Trust Me on This: Part 1" (Season 2, Episode 22) "Trust Me on This: Part 2" (Season 2, Episode 23)
1991–1994	Northern Exposure	Yes	No	No	"War and Peace" (Season 2, Episode 6) "Only You" (Season 3, Episode 2) "A-Hunting We Will Go" (Season 3, Episode 8) "Northern Lights" (Season 4, Episode 18) "Fish Story" (Season 5, Episode 18)
1992–1993	Beverly Hills, 90210	Yes	No	No	"Baby Makes Five" (Season 2, Episode 22) "Back in the High Life Again" (Season 3, Episode 19) "So Long, Farewell, Auf Wiedersehen, Goodbye" (Season 4, Episode 1)
1993	Harts of the West	Yes	No	No	"The Right Stuff" (Season 1, Episode 2) "Goodnight Irene" (Season 1, Episode 5) "Jake's Brother" (Season 1, Episode 8)
1993–1995	Lois & Clark: The New Adventures of Superman	Yes	No	No	"Pheromone, My Lovely" (Season 1, Episode 10) "Foundling" (Season 1, Episode 16) "The Eyes Have It" (Season 2, Episode 12)
1994	Picket Fences	Yes	No	No	"Abominable Snowman" (Season 2, Episode 13) "Away in the Manger" (Season 3, Episode 10)
1995	Courthouse	Yes	Yes	No	All episodes
1996	Time Well Spent	Yes	No	No	Pilot only
1996–2000	Chicago Hope	Yes	Yes	No	Season 3–6
1999	Get Real	Yes	No	No	"Performance Anxiety" (Season 1, Episode 6)
1999–2004	The West Wing	Yes	No	No	"The Short List" (Season 1, Episode 9) "Guns Not Butter" (Season 4, Episode 12) "The Warfare of Genghis Khan" (Season 5, Episode 13)
1999–2005	Judging Amy	No	No	Yes	All episodes
2000–2002	Ally McBeal	Yes	Yes	No	Season 4–5
2002	American Dreams	Yes	No	No	"Soldier Boy" (Season 1, Episode 6)
2002	Saturday Night Live	Yes	No	No	"Al Gore/Phish" (Season 28, Episode 8)
2003	Queens Supreme	Yes	No	No	All episodes
2003	The Brotherhood of Poland, New Hampshire	Yes	Yes	No	"Sleeping Lions" (Season 1, Episode 4)
2003	Miracles	Yes	Yes	No	"Saint Debbie" (Season 1, Episode 10)
2003	111 Gramercy Park	Yes	No	No	Pilot only
2004	The Practice	Yes	Yes	No	"The Case Against Alan Shore" (Season 8, Episode 18) "The Firm" (Season 8, Episode 19) "Comings and Goings" (Season 8, Episode 20) "New Hoods on the Block" (Season 8, Episode 21) "Adjourned" (Season 8, Episode 22)
2004–2008	Boston Legal	Yes	Yes	No	All episodes as producer 17 episodes as director
2009	Law & Order: Criminal Intent	Yes	No	No	"Rock Star" (Season 8, Episode 2)
2009	Eastwick	Yes	No	No	"Mooning and Crooning" (Season 1, Episode 5)
2009	Glee	Yes	No	No	"Hairography" (Season 1, Episode 11)
2009–2019	Grey's Anatomy	Yes	No	No	"Here's to Future Days" (Season 5, Episode 23) "Goodbye" (Season 6, Episode 2) "Perfect Little Accident" (Season 6, Episode 16) "Everything I Try to Do, Nothing Seems to Turn Out Right" (Season 10, Episode 23) "Fear" (Season 10, Episode 24) ”1-800-799-7233” (Season 14, Episode 9) ”Cold As Ice” (Season 14, Episode 23) ”Good Shepherd“ (Season 15, Episode 21)
2010	The Mentalist	Yes	No	No	"Redline" (Season 2, Episode 13)
2011	Wonder Woman	No	Yes	No	Pilot only
2011–2012	Harry's Law	Yes	Yes	No	All episodes as producer 7 episodes as director
2013	Monday Mornings	Yes	Yes	No	All episodes as producer 4 episodes as director
2013	Chris D'Elia: White Male. Black Comic	Yes	No	No	Special television
2013–2014	The Crazy Ones	Yes	Yes	No	All episodes
2014	Manhattan	Yes	No	No	"A New Approach to Nuclear Cosmology" (Season 1, Episode 5)
2014–2020	How to Get Away with Murder	Yes	Yes	No	All episodes as producer 11 episodes as director
2015	Chris D'Elia Incorrigible	Yes	No	No	Special television
2015–2016	Blunt Talk	Yes	No	No	3 episodes as director
2016	The Catch	Yes	No	No	"The Package" (Season 1, Episode 8)
2016	Goliath	Yes	No	No	"Game On" (Season 1, Episode 3)
2017	Chris D'Elia: Man on Fire	Yes	Yes	No	Special television
2018	The Good Doctor	Yes	No	No	2 episodes as director
2018	The Resident	Yes	No	No	"Identity Crisis" (Season 1, Episode 3)
2019	Grand Hotel	Yes	Yes	No	2 episodes as director
2021-2022	Big Shot	Yes	Yes	No	

=== As actor ===
==== Film ====
Year	Title	Role	Notes
2011	My Date with Drew	Himself	Documentary

==== Television ====
Year	Title	Role	Notes
1995	Lois & Clark: The New Adventures of Superman	Superintendent Across the Hall	"The Eyes Have It" (Season 2, Episode 12)
1995	Courthouse	Judge Wilson	"Order on the Court " (Season 1, Episode 4)
2002	Ally McBeal	'A Chorus Line' Producer	"What I'll Never Do for Love Again" (Season 5, Episode 20)
