= Dancing baby =

Short CGI video and internet meme

Screenshot of the dancing baby

The "Dancing Baby", also called "Baby Cha-Cha" or "the Oogachacka Baby", is an Internet meme of a 3D-rendered animation of a baby performing a cha-cha type dance. It quickly became a media phenomenon in the United States and one of the first viral videos in 1996.

== Origin ==
The original baby model file, Viewpoint Datalab's commercially available "Toddler with Diaper" Model #5653, was distributed in Character Studio, a plug-in for the Autodesk 3ds Max application (known as "3D Studio Max" at the time) from a division of Autodesk, Kinetix.

Robert Lurye, who was animating at Rhythm and Hues Studios, was hired by the software company Unreal Pictures and told to make more samples for their animation program prototype, the future Character Studio. Lurye started changing the choreography of a dancing adult skeleton that had been made by the team (the "chacha.bip" file). He added more dance moves, such as making it "play air guitar for a second and bend over and shake its shoulders." The program had multiple renderings of creatures that could be animated, including an alien, a dinosaur and a baby. The 3-D model of the baby had been developed by Viewpoint DataLabs' Tony Morrill, and was based on a scan of a plastic doll. Team member John Chadwick, by using the Physique software, made the baby model perform the skeleton's dance. He stated that it was his idea to load the dancing animation on the baby. Vulture reports that the animation was also developed by Paul Bloemink, John Hutchinson and Adam Felt.

The result was a file with the name "sk_baby.max". Kinetix exhibited a demo of the Dancing Baby in the 1995 SIGGRAPH computer graphics conference. Character Studio was released in August 1996. According to The New York Times, Unreal Pictures co-founder Michael Girard had discarded the Dancing Baby, opining it was "disturbing" for its realistic nature.

== Spread ==
LucasArts animator and Autodesk customer Ron Lussier recovered the Dancing Baby by recombining the chacha.bip file with the baby model (which was commercially available), made some minor changes and posted it on a CompuServe Internet forum as an .avi format. He also reportedly sent the Dancing Baby to his colleagues by e-mail. Although Girard credits Lussier as being responsible for the meme's spread, news website Vox reports that the meme became viral after it was converted and posted as an animated GIF by developer John Woodell.

Artist Rob Sheridan, known for art direction with Nine Inch Nails, contributed to the meme's early fame and ran a "Dancing Baby" fan site known as "The Unofficial Dancing Baby Homepage" where users could submit their own variations for Sheridan to post to the site. A popular variation contained the song "Hooked on a Feeling" by Blue Swede, hence the name "Oogachacka Baby", propelling the meme to viral status between 1997–1998. In 1998, Sheridan was interviewed by news outlets about his website.

Users and animators were able to render their own video clips of the 'original' animated dancing baby (sk_baby.max) and circulate these via the Compuserve Internet forums and the World Wide Web (commercial and private websites) and in e-mail. Such activity proliferated most significantly from mainstream (Windows users) royalty-free access to—and user renderings of—the 3D dancing baby source file for use on the Internet and in broadcast television via several news editorials, advertisements, and even comic programming in local, national, and international markets. Woodell's animated GIF then proliferated to numerous other websites, and later proceeded to show up in a broad array of mainstream media, including television dramas such as Ally McBeal, commercial advertisements, and music videos between 1997 and 1998.

=== Modifications ===
Variations to the original animation were later produced by numerous animators by modifying the sk_baby.max sample file's animation or the baby model itself, including a "drunk baby", a "rasta baby", a "samurai baby", and others. However, none of these became as popular on the Internet as the original file, and most popular uses of Dancing Baby are virtually unchanged from the original character mesh and animation.

== See also ==
- Internet celebrity
- Viral videos
- Lenz v. Universal Music Corp.
