= Ling Woo =

Fictional character from Ally McBeal

- Ally McBeal character
- First appearance: They Eat Horses, Don't They? (1998)
- Portrayed by: Lucy Liu

In-universe information
- Occupation: Judge, Commonwealth of Massachusetts; Of counsel, Cage & Fish
- Nationality: American

Ling Woo is a fictional character in the US comedy drama Ally McBeal, portrayed by Chinese-American actress Lucy Liu. A Mandarin-speaking Chinese-American lawyer, Ling has been described as cold and ferocious.

At the time, she was cited as the most famous and only significant representative of Asian women on US television (besides news anchors and reporters). Thus, her characterization has attracted much scholarly attention in the US.

== Background ==
Ally McBeal is an American television series created by David E. Kelley which ran on the Fox network from 1997 to 2002. Set in the fictional Boston law firm of Cage, Fish and Associates, the series explores the relationships among various lawyers working at the firm, often as they relate to gender-specific issues raised in court cases. Ling Woo was a character written by Kelley specifically for actress Lucy Liu after she failed to secure the role of Nelle Porter in the show.

Woo appeared for the first time in the second season episode They Eat Horses, Don't They? as a client suing a Howard Stern-like talk show host named Wick. She was suing because Wick's programs contributed to sexual harassment in her workplace. Wick claimed Woo brought suit because she had a "slutty little Asian thing going", and Woo said that she wanted to sleep with Wick because if she did, she would kill him. The character proved to be a hit, and Liu was signed on as a regular for the series.

Ling became a lawyer with the firm by pressuring Richard Fish, the firm's senior partner, to hire her services as counsel. She remained a regular on the show until 2001, when her role was reduced to four episodes in the upcoming season. Ling's employment history changed that season when the Governor of Massachusetts offers Ling a job as judge after Ling complimented her twin babies. Woo is a graduate of Cornell Law School where she was editor of the Law Review.

Asian women were rarely given prominent roles on American television. In 1994 Margaret Cho had a brief prime-time show called All American Girl, which was not popular with audiences and did not last a full season. When the show aired, there had not been another Asian-American-centered show or an Asian main character at the time the Ling character was created. Unlike the 1970s depictions of docile East Asian women on TV, Ling's character was the opposite, but still a classic stereotype, that of the Dragon Lady. At the time, she was the only significant representative of Asian women on television in the United States (besides news anchors and reporters), leaving no one else to counteract this prominent stereotype. She remains the most memorable Asian TV character of the 1990s.

== Character ==
Ling Woo's character has been described as the antithesis of Ally McBeal's. For example, Woo is portrayed as evil, McBeal as good; Woo growls, McBeal purrs. At the same time, Woo's verbal assaults present a fantasy of authority that appeals to even McBeal, who says, "She's my hero, she's vicious, I disagree with almost everything she says, she treats me like dirt, and somehow she's my hero."

The character's main function was to inject into the show "sensuality, promise, terror, sublimity, idyllic pleasure, intense energy" – elements long associated with the Orient in Western culture, according to Orientalism author Edward Said. Woo embodies stereotypes of the geisha, the unreadable Oriental, and the dragon lady.

Describing her as "fearsome, devouring, vicious, cool," and with an "exotic sexuality", Georgia State University professor Greg Smith sees Woo as a stereotype of Asian women, a "Dragon Lady".

Her character was frequently used to examine matters related to gender definition and topics. Woo is the only major character in Ally McBeal who does not have an origin story for her particular neurosis, and is exempt from the psychoanalytic focus given to others in the series, which Smith attributes to her Asian "mysteriousness".

=== Cold and vicious ===
Woo is cast as a villain, underscored by her frequent appearance to the theme music that accompanied the Wicked Witch of the West in the Wizard of Oz. Unlike a melodramatic villain such as J. R. Ewing, Woo was cast as a remarkably heartless character until well into her second season (Season 3 of the show), when she begins to befriend other characters.

She harasses and belittles people with disabilities. When visiting a hospital, Woo accidentally collides with a man in a wheelchair, and shouts, "Watch where you are going! It's bad enough that you people get all the parking spots!" To an individual with Tourette syndrome, she says, "I think Tourettes is so cool. It would be great to be able to annoy people like that. You get to whoop and twitch. Any other good ones?" A passing blind man accidentally taps her with his cane, and Woo cries, "They're not weapons! ... I so prefer the deaf to the blind." Woo also impersonates the blind to get her way. In one episode she puts on sunglasses, extends a telescoping white cane, and walks across a busy street, tires squealing as she hits a couple of cars with her cane. Woo is unapologetic for these affronts. When pointed out that "there are real blind people in the world", she retorts, "It's not like any of them saw me."

Woo is concerned with petty annoyances that disrupt her pleasure or inconvenience her. When a colleague is stuck in an elevator with his feet dangling out of the doors, she asks, "Does this mean I'm going to have to take the stairs?" She is impatient in getting what she wants, for example snapping at a judge to "hurry up" as he reads a verdict. She frequently announces that she is uninterested in proceedings that do not affect her personally. As her co-counsel questions a witness in court, Woo objects to the judge, "I'm bored! As an officer of the court, I have a duty to be open and forthright. I think the witness is tedious and I'm concerned for the jury's attention span."

Smith sees Woo's attacks as pointed and consciously vicious. She attacks because her words have consequences, clearing a path for her own selfish interests. Nelle Porter says, "I admire the way you don't let yourself be pushed around. Too many people when they think they've been wronged just walk away."

Jeff Yang, founding publisher of A Magazine, a New York-based publication on Asian-American culture, sees Ling as "a strong Asian woman who's clearly potent, clearly has control. She's not a victim, not somebody who lets anyone come even close to victimizing her."

Even though she coldly tyrannizes virtually everyone around her, she is sometimes hurt and confused over being disliked. She admits, "It's lonely on the bench. I thought I'd like a place where people can't get to you but once in a while..." A colleague completes her thought: "You need to have somebody who can get to you."

=== Hypersexual ===
University of Wyoming Associate Professor Tracey Patton sees Woo as the embodiment of the Asian fantasy woman, the seductive temptress expert in eroticism who is knowledgeable in the art of sexual pleasure unknown to the Western world. In one episode, she agreed to have sex only after her partner signed a health waiver and confidentiality agreement to protect her sexual secrets. In another episode, Woo is hired by Richard Fish as an attorney in his firm, in exchange for sexual favors. Woo's sexual foreplay with Richard Fish included sucking his fingers, dropping hot wax on him, and performing a "hair-tickling massage" on his bare chest. In regards to this encounter, Jeff Yang stated: "What she offered was not too far from an Oriental massage – hair splayed across his chest, his stricken face, the whole interracial thing. It's clearly something that plays off so many deep-seated fantasies about Asian American women."

Woo's attitude to sex is cold and uninterested. While depicted as a sexual predator, she nonetheless "doesn't like sex"; "it's messy" and "overrated". She is able to keep her boyfriend interested without having to have intercourse with him because she does not like sweat. To Woo, according to Smith, sex is just another arena for her to exert control. To her, "Sex is a weapon", and "a woman hasn't got true control of a man until her hand is on the dumb stick." Woo enjoys using sex as a weapon, opining, "There's nothing I enjoy more than seeing a happy couple and coming between them." As with the "vicious" personality, most of this hyper-sexuality is gone by Season 3 (Woo's second season on the show).

Darrell Hamamoto, Professor of Asian American Studies at the University of California, Davis, describes Ling as "a neo-Orientalist masturbatory fantasy figure concocted by a white man whose job it is to satisfy the blocked needs of other white men who seek temporary escape from their banal and deadening lives by indulging themselves in a bit of visual cunnilingus while relaxing on the sofa."

Her liaisons are mostly with white men, but are not limited to them. One episode features a dream sequence in which Ally McBeal and Ling Woo go on a date and kiss on screen. The kiss was shot in profile, locked lips clearly visible, rather than using the typical angle for same-sex kisses, in which the partner's head blocks the view of the actual contact. The scene was considered so racy that the episode was banned from being shown in Singapore. The episode won its time slot among young adult viewers during its showing in the November 1999 sweeps, even beating Monday Night Football. Woo made the "damn hot kiss" even hotter because "she's the exotic, erotic experimenter of the group", according to Scott Seomin, media director at that time for the Gay & Lesbian Alliance Against Defamation.

=== Alien ===
Patton states that Woo's actions, attitudes, and portrayal as an evil manipulator make her the alien of the law firm, and as such many of the lawyers in the firm did not want her hired. Campbell, a white male at the firm stated, "With her as a lawyer, the whole thing [the dynamic make-up of the firm] will change." Her non-white presence and competency are questioned. Even though she was the law review editor in law school, the presumption was she got the job mainly because Fish could not say no to Woo and her sexual promises. Woo is seen as an unwelcome addition to the law team despite her expertise and her success in law school.

Her character is the one most often portrayed on the show using animal effects. She frequently responds with a range of animal growls and snarls and breathes fire like a literal manifestation of dragon lady. Smith sees these effects as reinforcing the bestial undertone of the Asian stereotype, making her appear inhuman. Woo herself admits, "It must be hard being human. I wouldn't know. I never tried it."

In one episode, Woo literally turned into an alien, reminiscent of a scene from the movie Alien. Her transformation into an alien was a reference to her inability to fit in with the other lawyers, as well as a reference to her citizenship. Patton points out that the assumption is often made that a second-generation white immigrant is an American citizen, but that same assumption is not granted to people of color, in this case, Woo. Woo is not constructed as American (because an American is constructed as white), nor is she constructed as human. Woo, the only person of color at the law firm, is instead constructed and seen as foreign or alien.

Ling is not above using her ethnicity as a means of gaining advantage. In one episode, as she delivers her closing arguments to a jury, she says "There's a very old expression in China," and then begins to speak in Chinese. In the subtitles we see her saying, "It really doesn't matter what I say here, because none of you speak Chinese. But you can see from my sad face I'm sympathetic. You hear from my tone it's appropriate to feel sorry for me. As I drop to a faint whisper (which she does), you'll feel the sorrow yourself. I'm going to finish now, pretend to cry", which she does as she walks off.

== See also ==
- Asian fetish
- Femme fatale
- Stereotypes of East and Southeast Asians
