= Portia de Rossi =

Australian-American actress (born 1973)

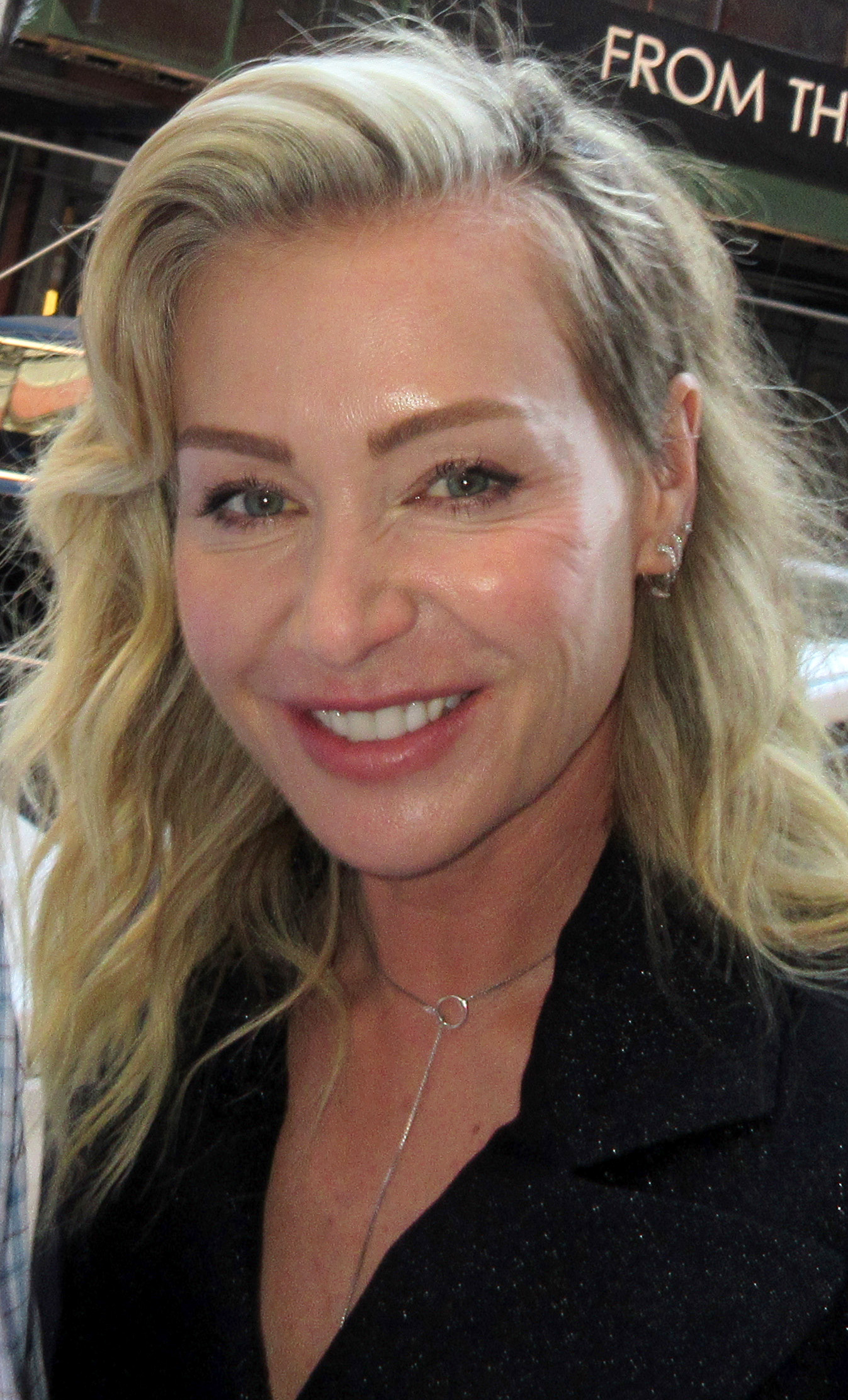
- de Rossi in 2019
- Born: Amanda Lee Rogers; 31 January 1973 (age 53); Horsham, Victoria, Australia
- Other name: Portia DeGeneres
- Citizenship: Australia; United States (since 2011)
- Education: University of Melbourne
- Occupation: Actress
- Years active: 1994–2019
- Spouses: Mel Metcalfe (m. 1996; div. 1999) Ellen DeGeneres (m. 2008)
- Relatives: Betty DeGeneres (mother-in-law); Vance DeGeneres (brother-in-law)

Portia Lee James DeGeneres (born Amanda Lee Rogers; 31 January 1973), known professionally as Portia de Rossi, is an Australian-American former actress. She played Nelle Porter on the American drama series Ally McBeal (1998–2002), for which she won a Screen Actors Guild Award; Lindsay Bluth Fünke on the American television sitcom Arrested Development (2003–2006, 2013, 2018–2019), and Elizabeth North on the American political thriller series Scandal (2014–2017).

She also portrayed high-end escort Olivia Lord on the American television drama series Nip/Tuck (2007–2009) and wise-cracking office manager Veronica Palmer on the American television sitcom Better Off Ted (2009–2010). De Rossi is a lesbian and is married to comedian, actress, and ex-television host Ellen DeGeneres.

== Early life ==
Portia de Rossi was born Amanda Lee Rogers in Horsham, Victoria, Australia, the daughter of Margaret, a medical receptionist, and Barry Rogers. Her father died when she was nine years old. She grew up in Grovedale, a suburb of Geelong, Victoria, and modelled for print and some TV commercials as a child. In 1988, at age 15, she adopted the name Portia de Rossi. In 2005, she said that she had done so to reinvent herself and sound more mature, using the given name of Portia, a character from William Shakespeare's The Merchant of Venice, and an Italian last name. She was educated at Geelong Grammar School, Melbourne Girls Grammar and the University of Melbourne, where she studied law.

== Career ==
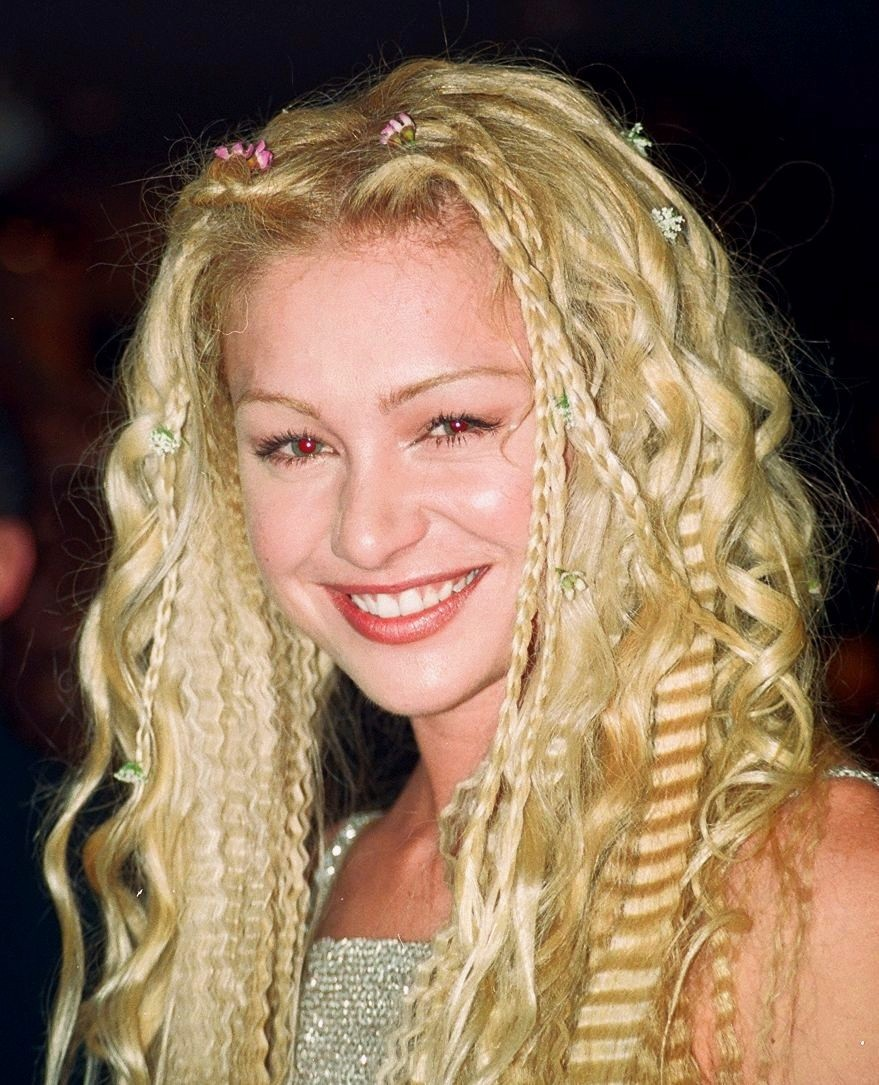
De Rossi in 1999

De Rossi's first significant role was as a young and impressionable maid in the Australian 1994 film Sirens. Soon afterwards, she moved to Los Angeles and won guest roles on several TV shows and a permanent role in Nick Freno: Licensed Teacher, before landing a part in the film Scream 2. During her time in the United States, de Rossi worked to acquire an American accent.

De Rossi garnered international attention when she joined the main cast of Ally McBeal in 1998, playing lawyer Nelle Porter. She remained with the show until its end in 2002. In 2001, she starred in Who Is Cletis Tout? alongside Christian Slater. From 2003 to 2006, de Rossi starred as Lindsay Bluth Fünke on Fox Television's Arrested Development. She next portrayed John F. Kennedy Jr.'s wife, Carolyn Bessette-Kennedy, in the made-for-TV movie America's Prince: The John F. Kennedy Jr. Story in 2003. That same year, she portrayed an Australian reporter who inspires a protest against Frank Sinatra during a concert tour in The Night We Called It a Day.

In 2005, de Rossi portrayed Zela, a fortune-teller, in the Wes Craven thriller Cursed. From 2007 to 2008, de Rossi appeared in Nip/Tuck's fifth season as Julia McNamara's girlfriend, Olivia Lord.

In 2009 and 2010, de Rossi played the high-strung and controlling Veronica Palmer on the ABC show Better Off Ted. In 2011, she appeared in Better Off Ted cast member Malcolm Barrett's music video for "Revenge of the Nerds", spoofing her character in a cameo alongside other cast members of the series.

She ranked 69th in Stuff Magazine's 100 Sexiest Women, 31 in Femme Fatales' Sexiest Women of 2003 list, and 24 in Maxim's 100 Sexiest Women List in 2004; in late 2006, the magazine Blender listed her as one of the hottest women of film and TV. In May 2007, she was featured as one of 100 Most Beautiful in a People special edition. TV Guide included her and Ellen DeGeneres in their Power A-List couples in 2007.

In February 2012, it was announced that ABC (the American Broadcasting Company, not the Australian Broadcasting Commission) had ordered a pilot for a new drama series The Smart One, one of whose executive producers was Ellen DeGeneres, and which featured de Rossi in a leading role. The actress was to star as a "brilliant and successful woman who begrudgingly goes to work for her less-brainy but more popular sister – a former beauty queen, weather girl and now big-city Mayor." The Smart One was not picked up for the 2012–2013 season.

Six years after the series was cancelled by Fox, filming for a revived fourth season of Arrested Development began in August 2012, and de Rossi reprised her role as Lindsay Bluth Fünke. This fourth season consisted of 15 new episodes, which debuted on Netflix on 26 May 2013. Each episode focused on one particular character, with de Rossi's Lindsay featured in episode 3, "Indian Takers", and Episode 8, "Red Hairing", and also appearing in several other episodes of the season.

In July 2014, ABC confirmed that de Rossi was joining season 4 of Scandal, in the role of Elizabeth North. Her recurring role was upgraded to a series regular for the fifth season. De Rossi made the decision to depart the series in 2017.

In May 2018, de Rossi announced on The Ellen DeGeneres Show that she would be retiring from acting, though she later elaborated that she would make an exception for future seasons of Arrested Development.

She is the founder and CEO of the art company General Public.

== Personal life ==
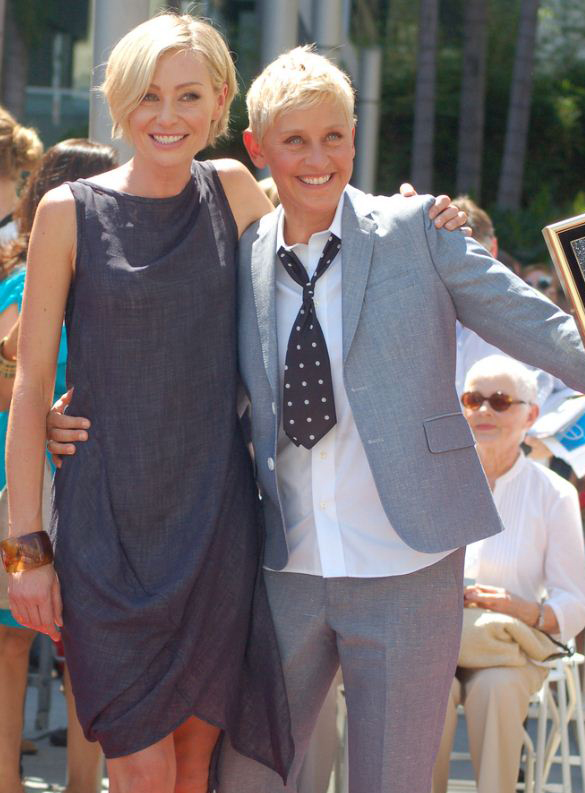
De Rossi and her wife, Ellen DeGeneres, in September 2012

De Rossi was married to documentary filmmaker Mel Metcalfe from 1996 to 1999, initially part of a plan to get a green card, though she did not go through with the plan. She said about the marriage that "it just obviously wasn't right for me." In a 2010 interview on Good Morning America, she said that as a young actress, she was fearful of being exposed as a lesbian. She also revealed that Metcalfe cheated on her with her sister-in-law Renee, then married to De Rossi's brother Michael; the two left their respective spouses to be together.

From 2000 to 2004, de Rossi dated director Francesca Gregorini, the daughter of Barbara Bach and the stepdaughter of Ringo Starr. She said that most of her family and Ally McBeal castmates did not know she was a lesbian until tabloid pictures of the couple were published. She declined to publicly discuss the relationship or her sexual orientation at the time.

de Rossi and Gregorini broke up in late 2004 because de Rossi began dating DeGeneres, whom she met backstage at an awards show. In 2005, she opened up publicly about her sexual orientation in interviews with Details and The Advocate. She and DeGeneres became engaged when DeGeneres proposed in 2008. They were married at their Beverly Hills home on 16 August 2008, witnessed by their mothers and 19 other guests. On 6 August 2010, de Rossi filed a petition to legally change her name to Portia Lee James DeGeneres. The petition was granted on 23 September 2010. She became a United States citizen in September 2011.

In 2010, de Rossi published her autobiography, titled Unbearable Lightness: A Story of Loss and Gain, within which she wrote about the trauma and turmoil that she had experienced in her life, including suffering from anorexia nervosa and bulimia and being misdiagnosed with lupus. She had struggled with the eating disorders for five years while filming Ally McBeal. To promote the book, she appeared on The Oprah Winfrey Show and The Ellen DeGeneres Show.

DeGeneres and de Rossi both became vegans in 2008, though DeGeneres said in December 2018 that she is no longer vegan and no longer associates with the vegan lifestyle. The couple have adopted several rescue animals.

In 2017, de Rossi tweeted that actor Steven Seagal had exposed himself to her while she was auditioning for one of his films.

In November 2024, de Rossi and DeGeneres relocated from their home in Montecito, California, to the Cotswolds region of England. The move was reportedly brought on by the re-election of Donald Trump as president, and "they do not have plans to return to the United States". The couple purchased the home in the Cotswolds before the 2024 presidential election.

de Rossi and Ellen DeGeneres announced they are selling their country home in August 2025, to move to a larger estate nearby.

== Philanthropy ==
De Rossi supports a variety of charitable organizations, including Locks of Love, a group that provides high-quality human hair wigs for children and teens with alopecia and other medical conditions that cause hair loss.

She has also supported fundraising efforts for FXB International, an African AIDS relief organization, and The Art of Elysium, an art foundation for terminally ill children. De Rossi also supports Alley Cat Allies, an organization dedicated to protecting and improving the lives of alley cats. De Rossi and DeGeneres are major supporters of The Gentle Barn, a California sanctuary for physically abused animals.

== Filmography ==
=== Film ===
Film work by Portia de Rossi
| Year | Title | Role | Notes |
|---|---|---|---|
| 1994 | Sirens | Giddy | |
| 1995 | The Woman in the Moon | Shauna | |
| 1997 | Scream 2 | Sorority Sister Murphy | |
| 1998 | Girl | Carla Sparrow | |
| 1999 | The Invisibles | Joy | |
| 1999 | American Intellectuals | Sarah | |
| 1999 | Stigmata | Jennifer Kelliho | |
| 2001 | Women in Film | Gina | |
| 2001 | Who Is Cletis Tout? | Tess Donnelly | |
| 2003 | Two Girls from Leemore | Blind Woman | |
| 2003 | I Witness | Emily Thompson | |
| 2003 | The Night We Called It a Day | Hilary Hunter | |
| 2004 | Dead & Breakfast | Kelly | |
| 2005 | Cursed | Zela | |
| 2009 | The Shift | Denise Moore | |
| 2014 | Unity | Narrator | Documentary |
| 2015 | Now Add Honey | Beth Halloway | |

=== Television ===
Television work by Portia de Rossi
| Year | Title | Role | Notes |
|---|---|---|---|
| 1995–1996 | Too Something | Maria Hunter | Main cast; 22 episodes |
| 1996–1997 | Nick Freno: Licensed Teacher | Elana Lewis | Main cast; 22 episodes |
| 1997 | Veronica's Closet | Carolyn | Episode: "Veronica's First Date" |
| 1998 | Astoria | | TV movie |
| 1998 | A Breed Apart | Lana Collins | TV movie |
| 1998–2002 | Ally McBeal | Nelle Porter | Main cast; 89 episodes |
| 1999 | Ally | Nelle Porter | Main cast; 12 episodes; Ally McBeal spin-off |
| 2002 | The Glow | Jackie Lawrence | TV movie |
| 2002 | The Twilight Zone | Laurel Janus | Episode: "Dead Man's Eyes" |
| 2003 | America's Prince: The John F. Kennedy Jr. Story | Carolyn Bessette-Kennedy | TV movie |
| 2003 | Mister Sterling | Lauren Barnes | 2 episodes: "Wish List" and "Final Passage" |
| 2003–2006, 2013–2019 | Arrested Development | Lindsay Bluth Fünke | Main cast; 70 episodes |
| 2007–2009 | Nip/Tuck | Olivia Lord | Recurring cast (season 5); 10 episodes |
| 2009–2010 | Better Off Ted | Veronica Palmer | Main cast; 26 episodes |
| 2012 | Mockingbird Lane | Lily Munster | Pilot |
| 2014 | Sean Saves the World | Jill | Episode: "The Joy of Ex" |
| 2014–2017 | Scandal | Elizabeth North | Recurring (season 4), main cast (Seasons 5–6) |
| 2017 | Santa Clarita Diet | Dr. Wolf | 2 episodes: "The Book!" and "Baka, Bile and Baseball Bats" |
| 2017 | Doc McStuffins | Edie (voice) | Episode: The Emergency Plan" |
| 2017 | Family Guy | Bonnie Swanson (prank call voice) | Episode: "A House Full of Peters" |
| 2022 | The Kardashians | Herself | Episode: "Who Is Kim K?" |
