= Albert Hall (actor) =

American actor (born 1937)

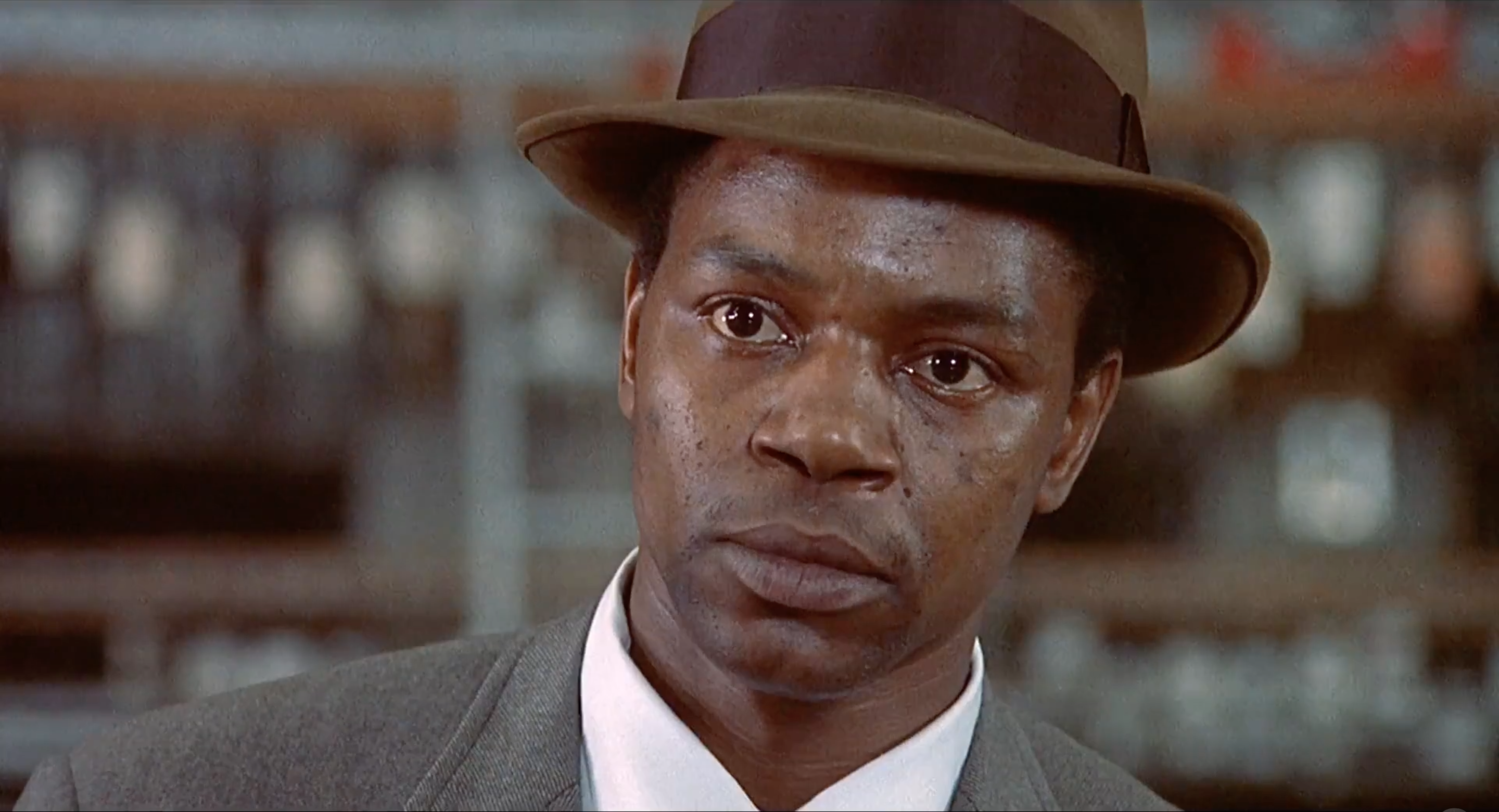
- Hall as Pointer in Willie Dynamite (1973)
- Born: November 10, 1937 (age 88); Brighton, Alabama, U.S.
- Occupation: Actor
- Years active: 1970–present
- Known for: role as Baines in the Spike Lee film Malcolm X (1992)

Albert W. Hall (born November 10, 1937) is an American retired actor. He portrayed Chief Phillips in the 1979 war film Apocalypse Now and Judge Seymore Walsh in Ally McBeal and The Practice. He also played Brother Baines in the 1992 Spike Lee film Malcolm X. His last screen role was a 2011 episode of the television series Men of a Certain Age.

== Early life and education ==
Hall was born and raised in Brighton, Alabama. He graduated from the Columbia University School of the Arts.

== Career ==
=== Early work ===
After portraying Pointer in Willie Dynamite (1974), Hall had a part in the 1976 biopic Leadbelly. He played a co-pilot in the 1978 film The Bermuda Triangle. Hall had a small role in the 1979 miniseries Roots: The Next Generations.

=== Apocalypse Now ===
Hall gained mainstream attention for his role as Chief Phillips in Francis Ford Coppola's 1979 war classic Apocalypse Now, in which his character, as a Chief Petty Officer, leads the rest of a United States Navy PBR (Patrol Boat, River) crew upriver from Vietnam to Cambodia so that Captain Willard (Martin Sheen) can complete his mission to assassinate Colonel Kurtz (Marlon Brando). To prepare for the role, Hall did research to accurately portray someone experiencing the Vietnam War first hand. The actor described filming in the Philippines as "exotic" and added that "it was all fun."

When Hall's Separate but Equal (1991) co-star Jeffrey Wright told him that Apocalypse Now is his favorite film, he gave him a book in which he wrote inside, "Jeffrey, evolution is when a young actor comes up to you and says, 'I've seen your work, you know, a hundred so times, and it has meaning to me.'"

According to Slate, some of Hall's dialogue in Apocalypse Now Redux is semi-improvised. Hall's performance in both versions has been praised by the Pittsburgh Post-Gazette and Variety respectively.

=== Later work ===
Hall appeared in the 1981 miniseries The Sophisticated Gents. In 1983, Hall had his first regular role in the short-lived series Ryan's Four. Hall also appeared alongside Sidney Poitier in the 1991 television movie Separate but Equal.

Throughout the 1990s, Hall appeared in a range of films, starting with memorable performances in Malcolm X (1992) and Rookie of the Year (1993). He collaborated with Spike Lee, the director of the former film, again in Get on the Bus (1996). Other films Hall appeared in during that decade include Major Payne (1995), Devil in a Blue Dress (1995), Courage Under Fire (1996) and Beloved (1998).

In the late 1990s, Hall became known by television audiences for his recurring role as Judge Seymore Walsh in the series The Practice and Ally McBeal, both of which were created by David E. Kelley. Coincidentally, he portrayed the role of a judge in soap operas such as The Young and the Restless and Days of Our Lives.

Hall has portrayed real life figures such as Hank Aaron in the 1998 television film The Tiger Woods Story and Elijah Muhammad in Michael Mann's 2001 biopic Ali. Hall played the recurring role of Bruce in the series Men of a Certain Age.

== Filmography ==
- Cotton Comes to Harlem (1970) - Background Detective (uncredited)
- Willie Dynamite (1973) - Pointer
- Leadbelly (1976) - Dicklikker
- Apocalypse Now (1979) - Chief Phillips
- Cry Freedom (1987) - Haraka
- The Night They Saved Christmas (1984) - Loomis
- Trouble in Mind (1985) - Leo
- Betrayed (1988) - FBI Agent Al Sanders
- The Fabulous Baker Boys (1989) - Henry
- Mancuso, F.B.I. (1989) - Colonel Hallack
- Music Box (1989) - Mack Jones
- Malcolm X (1992) - Baines
- Rookie of the Year (1993) - Sal Martinella
- Major Payne (1995) - Gen. Decker
- Devil in a Blue Dress (1995) - Odell
- The Great White Hype (1996) - Roper's Manager
- Courage Under Fire (1996) - Speaker
- Get on the Bus (1996) - Craig
- Jimi (1996) - Boxcar
- Anarchy TV (1998) - Bobby
- Beloved (1998) - Stamp Paid
- Apocalypse Now Redux (2001)
- Ali (2001) - Elijah Muhammad
- Honeydripper (2007) - Reverend Cutlip
- National Treasure: Book of Secrets (2007) - Dr. Nichols
- Not Easily Broken (2009) - Bishop Wilkes
- Apocalypse Now Final Cut (2019)
