= Lisa Nicole Carson =

American actress

- Born: July 12, 1969 (age 57)
- Occupation: Actress
- Years active: 1991–2002; 2012; 2017

Lisa Nicole Carson (born July 12, 1969) is an American actress. She is best known for her roles as Carla in ER (1996–2001), and Renee Raddick in Ally McBeal (1997–2002). Carson has also starred in films, most notably as Marti in Jason's Lyric (1994), Coretta in Devil in a Blue Dress (1995), Josie in Love Jones (1997), and Sylvia in Life (1999).

Following her struggles with bipolar disorder, for which she was hospitalized while starring in Ally McBeal, Carson went on hiatus until 2012, when she reprised her role as Renee Raddick in the final episode of Harry's Law. Most recently, Carson starred as Mae Bell in the miniseries The New Edition Story (2017).

== Career ==
Carson appeared in productions at the famed Negro Ensemble Company. Her first notable credit came in 1991, when she appeared in Law & Order and in 1992 she had a non-speaking, minor role in the comedy series, The Cosby Show. She was a regular on The Apollo Comedy Hour before appearing in film in Let's Get Bizzee (1993), Jason's Lyric (1994) and Devil in a Blue Dress (1995). She has appeared in Love Jones and Life. She also performed as an R&B singer in the 1995 television movie Divas. She had a role in the 1997 movie Eve's Bayou, as Mattie Mereaux.

On television, she played the recurring character Carla Reese, the on/off girlfriend of Eriq La Salle's Dr. Peter Benton in NBC's ER between 1996 and 2001. Between 1997 and 2002 she played prosecutor Renee Raddick in Fox's Ally McBeal, a role for which she received multiple award nominations. Carson was fired from both roles, amid reports about her erratic behavior on and off set, alleged drug use, being arrested and admissions to a mental health facility. She did return to Ally McBeal to reprise her role for the final episode.

After a ten-year hiatus, she returned to acting in 2012, featuring in a guest appearance in the second-season finale of the NBC series Harry's Law reprising her character Renee Raddick from Ally McBeal. In 2017, she starred in the BET miniseries The New Edition Story.

== Personal life ==
In 2000, she was arrested and then committed to a psychiatric hospital after having a mental breakdown at a hotel in Manhattan.

In the July 2015 issue of Essence, Carson gave an interview in which she openly described her struggles with bipolar disorder and how the illness has affected her life and career. After having taken a 10-year hiatus from show business to live and receive treatment in New York, she reported having moved back to Los Angeles with plans to revitalize her acting career.

== Filmography ==
=== Film ===
Year	Title	Role	Notes
1993	Let's Get Bizzee	Keisha Carson	film debut
1994	Jason's Lyric	Marti	
1995	Devil in a Blue Dress	Coretta James	
1995	Divas	Jewel	Television film
1997	Love Jones	Josie Nichols	
1997	White Lies	Glinda	
1997	Eve's Bayou	Matty Mereaux	
1999	Life	Sylvia	

=== Television ===
Year	Title	Role	Notes
1991	Law & Order	Jasmine	Episode: "Aria"
1992	The Cosby Show	Lisa (uncredited)	Episode: "And So, We Commence"
1992–1993	The Apollo Comedy Hour	Herself	Main role
1993	Lifestories: Families in Crisis	Jenny	Episode: "No Visible Bruises: The Katie Koestner Story"
1993	ABC Afterschool Special	Desiree	Episode: "Girlfriend"
1995	Divas	Jewel	Television film
1996–2001	ER	Carla Reese / Carla Simmons	Main role
1997–2002	Ally McBeal	Renee Raddick	Main role
1998	Getting Personal	Cleo Coles	Episode: "Sam I Am"
1998	Damon	Lt. Dana Byrne (uncredited)	Episode: "The Test"
1999	Aftershock: Earthquake in New York	Evie Lincoln	Main role
1999	Ally	Renee Raddick	Main role
2012	Harry's Law	Renee Raddick	Episode: "Onward and Upward"
2017	The New Edition Story	Mae Bell	2 episodes
