= List of Boston Legal episodes =

Boston Legal is an American legal drama-comedy (dramedy) created by David E. Kelley, which was produced in association with 20th Century Fox Television for ABC. The series aired from October 3, 2004, to December 8, 2008.

Boston Legal is a spin-off of long-running Kelley series The Practice, following the exploits of former Practice character Alan Shore (James Spader) at the legal firm of Crane, Poole & Schmidt. During the course of the series, 101 episodes of Boston Legal aired over five seasons.

== Series overview ==
Season	Episodes	Originally released	
Season	Episodes	First released	Last released
1	17	October 3, 2004	March 20, 2005
2	27	September 27, 2005	May 16, 2006
3	24	September 19, 2006	May 29, 2007
4	20	September 25, 2007	May 21, 2008
5	13	September 22, 2008	December 8, 2008

== Episodes ==
=== Season 1 (2004–05) ===
No. overall	No. in season	Title	Directed by	Written by	Original release date	Prod. code	U.S. viewers (millions)
1	1	"Head Cases"	Bill D'Elia	Scott Kaufer, Jeff Rake, and David E. Kelley	October 3, 2004	1AJQ01	13.07
When senior partner Edwin Poole (Larry Miller) is institutionalized, Paul Lewiston asks Brad Chase to return to the Boston office to help stabilize it; Alan Shore is assigned a case in which a mother wants to sue the producers of Annie after her daughter is refused the title role because she is black; Brad and Sally Heep file an emergency appeal when a client's ex-husband will not allow her to take her children to New York; Denny Crane tries to prevent his client from hiring a private investigator to find out who his wife's lover is, and Lewiston assigns Lori Colson to ensure that an investigator is not hired.
2	2	"Still Crazy After All These Years"	Charles Haid	Kerry Ehrin & David E. Kelley	October 10, 2004	1AJQ03	12.13
Alan helps Christine Pauley (Elizabeth Mitchell), an ex-lover whom he had committed, secure release from the mental hospital and Sally and Tara become concerned for Alan once it appears that Christine is stalking him; Denny finds himself at the end of a lawsuit when he comments on an opposing client's sex life. Paul Lewiston and the senior partners plan to oust Denny from the firm, something Lori and Brad try to stop.
3	3	"Catch and Release"	Daniel Attias	David E. Kelley and Peter Ocko	October 17, 2004	1AJQ05	11.14
A client's major real estate project is slowed to a halt when a lawyer, Denny's estranged illegitimate son (Freddie Prinze Jr.), files a temporary restraining order to save an endangered fish; Lori supervises Alan in a sexual harassment case where opposing counsel happens to be Christine; Sally is nervous about her first jury trial, especially when it becomes clear her client is guilty.
4	4	"Change of Course"	Ron Underwood	Story by : David E. Kelley & Jonathan Shapiro; Teleplay by : David E. Kelley	October 24, 2004	1AJQ04	10.82
Edwin Poole escapes from the mental hospital and takes a murder case. When Edwin proves incompetent, Lori must overcome her own principles to defend his murder client; Alan defends one of the firm's biggest clients after she is caught stealing a scarf and jeopardizes his relationship with Sally by asking her to commit an unethical act.
5	5	"An Eye for an Eye"	Mike Listo	Jeff Rake & David E. Kelley	October 31, 2004	1AJQ06	11.59
Alan and Tara represent a hypochondriac suing his physician for malpractice; Lori and Sally take a court appointment accused of killing a man in a bar fight, but face difficulties when it is revealed he knew the victim; when a class-action suit assigned to Edwin Poole comes up for trial, Brad and Paul rush to coach Denny on the facts of the case.
6	6	"Truth Be Told"	Tucker Gates	Scott Kaufer	November 7, 2004	1AJQ07	11.88
Alan helps an old crush (Dana Delany) when her husband's campaign for mayor is threatened by slander, posing a conflict of interest, as the firm already represents his opponent; Denny takes a test for Alzheimer's disease; Paul is concerned when he notices a decline in Denny's workload; Lori helps an Assistant District Attorney who wants access to his son's frozen umbilical cord to treat his multiple myeloma; Sally is surprised when Denny steals her client, although it turns out to be in the best interests of the firm.
7	7	"Questionable Characters"	Mel Damski	Lukas Reiter	November 21, 2004	1AJQ08	12.04
Lori helps her former informant who was shot while robbing a convenience store and who does not want the bullet removed because it could incriminate him, even though the bullet is jeopardizing his life; Alan tries to help his client who is accused of being a slumlord and is forced to do a despicable act from an infuriating judge even though he has been hospitalized; Denny gets arrested for solicitation.
8	8	"Loose Lips"	Jeannot Szwarc	Jonathan Shapiro & David E. Kelley	November 28, 2004	1AJQ09	13.65
After Denny rejects a case for personal reasons, Alan defends a man who was fired from being a department store Santa Claus because he is a gay cross-dresser; Brad and Alan make a bet on Alan's case – the loser will be the others elf for the day; backed into a dilemma, Lori goes to extreme measures to help her therapist, but she soon discovers the consequences are more than she bargained for.
9	9	"A Greater Good"	Arlene Sanford	Peter Ocko	December 12, 2004	1AJQ10	11.72
Alan and Denny defend a drug company that is being sued by a woman who states they provided false reasoning when they took her off of an experimental pill that was a possible cure for her sickness and they discover a shocking secret that could make or break their case; Lori discovers that Tara's new information for their case would win it for them, but the way she retrieved it could cost them their case and their careers; Lori learns a secret about Brad.
10	10	"Hired Guns"	Dennis Smith	David E. Kelley	December 19, 2004	1AJQ11	12.68
Lori and Brad defend a woman who is accused of murdering her husband and his mistress while they were in bed together; Alan is held hostage when he helps a woman whose ex-husband repeatedly kidnaps their children every Christmas.
11	11	"Schmidt Happens"	Allison Liddi-Brown	David E. Kelley	January 9, 2005	1AJQ12	14.35
A prominent business man who is originally a Sudanese native wants to sue the U.S. government for the lack of action taken against the mayhem happening in his country and Paul looks to Lori to take the case; founding partner Shirley Schmidt arrives with a mission to bring order to the firm and while making herself known, she has to deal with Denny who does not want her there, help with Lori's extremely high profile case, and learns that she has to keep her eye on Alan; Alan ends up defending a man who killed his mother by accident, or so he says. * First appearance of Shirley Schmidt
12	12	"From Whence We Came"	Mike Listo	David E. Kelley	January 16, 2005	1AJQ13	13.88
Lori, along with Denny and Shirley, defend a school superintendent who fired three science teachers because they refused to teach creationism and is now being sued by them; Alan learns his assistant has expressed concern about their work relationship; Alan discovers that his client Bernard Ferrion, who killed his mother, may have killed again, and this time his neighbour; Sally is fired and learns that a close associate is not too keen on lending a supportive hand; Alan is surprised to see a familiar face appear – Catherine Piper (Betty White), from an earlier episode of The Practice where she was a witness in Alan's hometown murder case. * Final regular appearance of Sally Heep
13	13	"It Girls and Beyond"	Mike Listo	Jonathan Shapiro & David E. Kelley	January 23, 2005	1AJQ02	15.34
Brad becomes attracted to his client who is being sued for having a relationship with her business partner merely for financial purposes and to make matters more difficult, Brad convinces himself that the doubts he feels are due to her lying about being a lesbian; Alan is asked to second chair on Denny's trial case where a doctor is being sued for prescribing a drug that has not been FDA approved when Denny seems to be on a personal mission to prove that he is a competent attorney by taking the case solo and it turns out that the case has reflection in Denny's own life.
14	14	"'Til We Meat Again"	Bill D'Elia	David E. Kelley	February 13, 2005	1AJQ14	12.89
While out with Tara, Alan is assaulted leading to him causing a barroom brawl and, as a result, becomes arrested for conspiracy to commit assault & battery; Shirley and Denny represent a man whose steakhouse is being put out of business because the Selectmen of a small town have banned red meat in the town due to fear of mad-cow disease.
15	15	"Tortured Souls"	Jeff Bleckner	David E. Kelley	February 20, 2005	1AJQ15	13.62
Shirley asks Alan Shore to use his odious lawyering to help her defend a police officer accused of torture; Donny Crane returns and is the opposing counsel in Denny's case with Chelina Hall (Kerry Washington) as second chair, where a woman wants to sue her former boyfriend for saying no to her at the altar. For Denny, this is an easy case, while for Donny this is to settle a score with Denny for letting him believe for 25 years that he was his father; Bernard Ferrion is befriended by Catherine, and Alan finds variance with that.
16	16	"Let Sales Ring"	Hubert De La Bouillerie	David E. Kelley	March 13, 2005	1AJQ16	11.12
Milton Bombay (Carl Reiner) is asking the courts to allow him to be frozen until another century so he can continue his legacy of being a great lawyer and needs Denny and Shirley to defend him; Alan and Chelina defend a high school student who accuses his teacher of censorship when he blocks out a news station on the school's televisions. The news station in question is Fox News (a corporate partner of 20th Century Fox Television who co-produce the show) but whose name is only hinted at. The school in question is Winslow High School, the school in another Boston-based show from David E. Kelley, Boston Public, which features an appearance by the principal, Steven Harper and again played by Chi McBride.
17	17	"Death Be Not Proud"	Matt Shakman	David E. Kelley & Jonathan Shapiro	March 20, 2005	1AJQ17	11.18
Chelina asks Alan to assist her in Texas because her former client is getting executed but may be innocent of the crime; an old friend of Denny and Shirley asks them for legal representation when she is charged with having sexual encounters for a fee; Lori files a complaint about Denny with Shirley and Paul and they seriously consider doing something about it, especially when they suspect he performed an unethical act on his recent case.

=== Season 2 (2005–06) ===
No. overall	No. in season	Title	Directed by	Written by	Original release date	Prod. code
18	1	"The Black Widow"	Oz Scott	David E. Kelley	September 27, 2005	1AJQ19
Alan, Denny and Brad represent Kelly Nolan (Heather Locklear) who is on trial for poisoning her husband; Tara Wilson second-chairs for Shirley Schmidt and is shocked to find that the opposing counsel is her former lover, Malcolm Holmes (Rupert Everett); Garrett Wells and Sara Holt assist Denise Bauer on a case where a Jewish man felt violated when his Christian co-workers held Bible readings in the workplace. Making things worse, Denise is served with divorce papers. * First appearances of Denise Bauer, Sara Holt and Garrett Wells
19	2	"Schadenfreude"	Arlene Sanford	David E. Kelley	October 4, 2005	1AJQ20
The Kelly Nolan trial continues, but Alan, Denny, and Brad fear the worst when Kelly's cold demeanor begins to turn off the jury; Garrett and Sara are enlisted to help Denise in her divorce settlement; Malcolm convinces Tara to represent Johnny Damon, Edwin Starr's nephew, whose performance of Starr's hit song "War" strikes a nerve at a nightclub; Catherine worries about Bernard's reaction to the Nolan trial.
20	3	"Finding Nimmo"	Mike Listo	David E. Kelley	October 11, 2005	1AJQ21
Denny takes Alan to Nimmo Bay in British Columbia to help him get over his breakup with Tara; Catherine confesses to Bernard's murder; Sara and Garrett take extreme measures to help Denise challenge her husband's alimony demands in their divorce proceedings. * Final appearance of Tara Wilson
21	4	"A Whiff and a Prayer"	Bill D'Elia	David E. Kelley	October 18, 2005	2AJQ01
Denny's strong conservative values are put to the test when the firm represents a Democratic congressman who refused to keep a promise to his supporters; Alan tries to forget about Tara as he prepares to defend Catherine who is on trial for murder; Sara is given a bizarre ultimatum.
22	5	"Men to Boys"	Mike Listo	David E. Kelley	October 25, 2005	2AJQ02
Denise finds herself in a difficult position when an automobile injury case she neglected for three years comes up for trial and she is unprepared; while Garrett researches, he meets Cassie (Tamara Feldman), a young paralegal whose strange sexual tendencies hide a painful past; Denny learns he must apologize to Lori or face a sexual harassment suit; Alan takes Sara out for dinner and a "show". * Final appearance of Lori Colson
23	6	"Witches of Mass Destruction"	James Bagdonas	Lawrence Broch & Andrew Kreisberg & Michael Reisz	November 1, 2005	2AJQ03
Shirley and Denise represent Christian and Wiccan parents who are outraged by a public school's Halloween celebrations, but the case takes a turn for the worse when the clients begin arguing amongst themselves; Denny and Alan's friendship is tested when Alan helps Cassie sue the US military for the loss of her brother.
24	7	"Truly, Madly, Deeply"	Stephen Cragg	David E. Kelley	November 8, 2005	2AJQ04
Denny is called to defend a man who raped and killed a 13-year-old girl, but decides he would rather go to jail than spend his days defending murderers; Alan must face his fear of clowns; Shirley dumps a bizarre bestiality case on Denise. The bestiality sub-plot appears to be an appropriation of Edward Albee's play The Goat, or Who is Sylvia?
25	8	"The Ass Fat Jungle"	Ron Underwood	Janet Leahy & Phoef Sutton	November 15, 2005	2AJQ05
Denise finds herself wanting to sue her own client when Boston's most celebrated plastic surgeon, Dr. Barry Glouberman, (Richard Riehle) is under fire for unorthodox techniques; Shirley takes on a difficult case involving an Alzheimer's disease patient which touches her personally; Alan and Denny fight their own demons as Alan asks his new secretary to protect him from night terrors and Denny undergoes an MRI.
26	9	"Gone"	Mel Damski	Story by : David E. Kelley & Jonathan Shapiro; Teleplay by : David E. Kelley	December 6, 2005	2AJQ06
When the FBI's hands are tied with red tape, Brad helps Denise go undercover as a rogue agent in order to find a missing boy who is close to her heart but when legal and ethical roadblocks appear, they must make some difficult decisions; Denny's nonchalance regarding the use of firearms becomes a real concern for the other senior partners when he shoots a homeless man in the head with a paintball gun.
27	10	"Legal Deficits"	Mike Listo	David E. Kelley & Lawrence Broch	December 13, 2005	2AJQ07
After kidnapping a witness and physically assaulting a priest, Brad is put on trial and enlists the help of Denny and Shirley to bail him out; Alan's hands are full with his secretary's financial troubles when her credit card company charges ridiculous interest rates putting her $50,000 in debt. * First appearance of Jerry Espenson
28	11	"The Cancer Man Can"	Lou Antonio	Janet Leahy & Michael Reisz	January 10, 2006	2AJQ08
Paul recruits Denise to help him defend a cancer patient (Michael J. Fox) who used his wealth to guarantee he would not get a placebo during a drug study; Alan goes too far in trying to convince the senior partners to promote "Hands" (Jerry Espenson) to partner; Denny finds himself falling in love with a woman he meets at a charity event.
29	12	"Helping Hands"	Bill D'Elia	Phoef Sutton & Andrew Kreisberg	January 17, 2006	2AJQ09
Alan finds himself all alone against the firm when he decides to defend Jerry Espenson (Christian Clemenson) from charges of attempted murder, torture and terrorist threats; Denise and Daniel Post get closer as Daniel second chairs a case against parents who are constantly harassing their daughter's teacher; Paul is worried about the impact Denny's pending nuptials may have on the firm.
30	13	"Too Much Information"	Steve Robin	Andrew Kreisberg & Lawrence Broch	January 24, 2006	2AJQ10
Alan and Denise take on the case of a young girl whose father killed her mother after finding the mother's whereabouts through her HMO's website; Catherine Piper (Betty White) comes back into Alan's life — by robbing convenience stores; Beverly Bridge, Denny's fiancée, flexes her muscle around the firm and Brad attempts to manage the situation for Shirley and Paul; Daniel goes in for chemotherapy and attempts to shut out Denise.
31	14	"Breast in Show"	Arlene Sanford	Phoef Sutton & Michael Reisz	February 7, 2006	2AJQ11
After meeting Irma for a date, Alan finds himself defending her when she is charged with a sex crime after protesting topless; Denise finds it difficult to remain close to Daniel when he invites her to his own funeral; Garrett faces his toughest challenge yet when Catherine invades his office.
32	15	"Smile"	Robert Yannetti	Corinne Brinkerhoff	February 14, 2006	2AJQ12
Alan's friendly demeanor quickly turns into anger when a prestigious private school turns away a child prodigy because she lacks the facial muscles for smiling; Shirley and Denise take on a hospital that refused to administer emergency birth control to a rape victim due to religious beliefs; Brad is put on special assignment by Denny.
33	16	"Live Big"	Bill D'Elia	David E. Kelley	February 21, 2006	2AJQ13
Alan and Denny defend a man charged with murder after he euthanized his wife who had Alzheimer's disease; long-lost family members return when Shirley's ex-husband asks her to be "best man" at his wedding and Paul tracks down his estranged daughter (Jayne Brook). * Final appearances of Sara Holt and Garrett Wells
34	17	"...There's Fire!"	Mike Listo	Janet Leahy & Lawrence Broch	February 28, 2006	2AJQ14
Shirley, Paul and Brad batten down the hatches as Bev files for divorce hours after her marriage to Denny, and demands half of his assets; Alan helps an old friend who was fired for smoking on her private time to sue her employer.
35	18	"Shock and Oww!"	Jeff Bleckner	Phoef Sutton & Sanford Golden & Karen Wyscarver	March 7, 2006	2AJQ15
Shirley covertly asks Alan for help when nude photographs of her surface for auction; Paul sends Brad in undercover when he suspects his daughter is once again using drugs; Denny is inspired to take a case involving self-defense electrocution.
36	19	"Stick It"	Adam Arkin	David E. Kelley & Janet Leahy	March 14, 2006	2AJQ16
Alan once again goes to bat for Melissa, who is in serious trouble with the IRS, this time with much less confidence; Paul and Brad enact a plan to help Rachel get into rehab; Denise re-enters the world of dating with disastrous results.
37	20	"Chitty Chitty Bang Bang"	Ellie Kanner	Story by : Janet Leahy & Phoef Sutton & Sanford Golden & Karen Wyscarver; Teleplay by : Janet Leahy & Lawrence Broch	March 21, 2006	2AJQ17
Shirley defends a long-time client who does not want to lose his Victorian erotica collection ("The Lusty Turk", "Two Circus Virgins on Bareback" and a "Hysteria Machine" among other items) in his divorce, but she is shocked when Ivan is opposing council; Alan takes drastic steps to help Catherine's friend who is being taken advantage of in a nursing home; Paul cuts back on his time at the firm when Fiona begins to take priority, causing worry among the other partners.
38	21	"Word Salad Days"	Jeannot Szwarc	Michael Reisz & Sanford Golden & Karen Wyscarver	March 28, 2006	2AJQ18
After beginning to speak gibberish in court, Alan turns to Denny for help in curing his new, debilitating condition; Paul and Brad defend a video game company when a mother claims the company's addictive game killed her teenage son; Denise challenges the polygamy law.
39	22	"Ivan the Incorrigible"	Robert Yannetti	Phoef Sutton & Andrew Kreisberg	April 18, 2006	2AJQ19
Alan decides to help Jerry with his first big attempted-murder case, but has to take drastic action when Jerry's courtroom outbursts jeopardize the case; Shirley is shocked to discover that Ivan has yet to inform Missy that they are "divorced"; Brad becomes uncomfortable with a recurring word in his new relationship.
40	23	"Race Ipsa"	Lou Antonio	David E. Kelley	April 25, 2006	1AJQ18
When Denny shoots his therapist in self-defense, the senior partners, fed up with his rogue behavior, begin to enact plans to remove him from the firm; Alan enlists the help of Chelina in a racially charged case involving a black man being arrested for being in a white neighborhood; Brad asks Denise to teach him to be a better kisser.
41	24	"Deep End of The Poole"	Jeff Bleckner	Michael Reisz & Andrew Kreisberg	May 2, 2006	2AJQ20
Named partner Edwin Poole returns from a mental institution to Crane, Poole & Schmidt, but Shirley has reservations when he decides to sue a candy company; an Assistant District Attorney with a grudge against Alan brings charges, accusing him of advising his client to flee when a guilty verdict was inevitable; Brad and Denise decide where to take their relationship.
42	25	"Squid Pro Quo"	James Bagdonas	Janet Leahy & Lawrence Broch	May 9, 2006	2AJQ21
Marlene "The Squid" Stanger (Parker Posey) joins the firm, and Denise immediately sees her as competition; Donny Crane returns in a suit against the U.S. government's Mexico City Policy (aka the global gag rule), in which Denny is appointed to represent the government.
43	26	"Spring Fever"	Mike Listo	Story by : Courtney Flavin and Janet Leahy & Andrew Kreisberg; Teleplay by : Janet Leahy & Andrew Kreisberg	May 16, 2006	2AJQ22
While Denny and Alan are on an annual spring fling at the L.A. office, Denny's pursuit of a beautiful celebrity (Jeri Ryan) lands them a high-profile case when she shoots a paparazzo; Brad's 16-year-old niece is charged with manslaughter when a friend dies from a drug overdose at a party; Shirley defends a Victorian erotica expert (Ed Begley, Jr.) charged with solicitation, and Marlene "the Squid" steals Denise's idea for his defense.
44	27	"BL-Los Angeles"	Bill D'Elia	Lawrence Broch & Michael Reisz	May 16, 2006	2AJQ23
In Los Angeles, Alan defends a beautiful celebrity (Jeri Ryan) after she shot a paparazzo, while he also tries to protect her from Denny's advances; Brad tries to negotiate the best outcome for his 16-year-old niece on manslaughter charges and asks Shirley to step in when the judge in the case rejects the plea deal; the battle between Denise and Marlene "the Squid" Stanger reaches a head, with Denise on the losing end; Daniel Post returns from Switzerland with a surprise for Denise.

=== Season 3 (2006–07) ===
No. overall	No. in season	Title	Directed by	Written by	Original release date	Prod. code
45	1	"Can't We All Get a Lung?"	Mike Listo	David E. Kelley and Corinne Brinkerhoff	September 19, 2006	3AJQ01
Denise and Shirley defend Daniel Post for trying to buy a lung; Alan Shore seeks help for Jerry Espenson with his intimacy disability; Denny introduces Alan to a familiar face.
46	2	"New Kids on the Block"	Bill D'Elia	David E. Kelley	September 26, 2006	3AJQ04
New partner Jeffrey Coho (Craig Bierko) and Denise begin to represent Scott Little, who fears he is a suspect in the murder of a Judge; Denny Crane tries online dating with disastrous results; Alan and new associate Claire Simms (Constance Zimmer) represent a cross-dresser (Gary Anthony Williams) who was fired for taking maternity leave. * First appearances of Jeffrey Coho, Claire Simms and Clarence Bell
47	3	"Desperately Seeking Shirley"	Jim Bagdonas	David E. Kelley and Janet Leahy	October 3, 2006	3AJQ02
Shirley gets embroiled in a court battle with Alan when Ivan Tiggs challenges the post-nup she drafted; Jeffrey and Denise uncover incriminating evidence as they prepare the defense of Scott Little; Denny Crane is still stuck with his "dwarf" problem.
48	4	"Fine Young Cannibal"	Bob Yannetti	David E. Kelley	October 10, 2006	3AJQ03
As press coverage increases in the Little trial, Denise and Jeffrey continue their investigation, recruiting Claire to seduce Scott's therapist, and Paul to confront the deceased's husband; Alan and Shirley defend a cannibal; Denny and Brad assist Bethany Horrowitz (Meredith Eaton-Gilden) in her malpractice suit; Alan and Denny face off for the rights to Shirley.
49	5	"Whose God Is It Anyway?"	Lou Antonio	David E. Kelley	October 17, 2006	3AJQ05
The Scott Little trial begins amongst intense press coverage; Alan defends Jerry for firing a scientologist and is surprised to find Sally Heep is opposing counsel; Denny is tasked with trying to distract Gracie Jane as she lambastes Scott Little.
50	6	"The Verdict"	Jeff Bleckner	David E. Kelley	October 24, 2006	3AJQ06
The Scott Little case finally comes to a conclusion; Alan has concerns over his relationship with Sally.
51	7	"Trick or Treat"	Mike Listo	David E. Kelley and Lawrence Broch	October 31, 2006	3AJQ07
Denise and Shirley go in search for the remains of Daniel Post, who died during a lung transplant in Brazil; Brad represents Jeffrey when Lincoln Meyer sues for defamation; Alan defends Jerry Espenson, who is on trial for perjury; Denny meets Bethany's mother (Delta Burke).
52	8	"Lincoln"	Steve Robin	David E. Kelley	November 26, 2006	3AJQ08
Alan helps Jerry Espenson, whose client stands accused of murdering her ex-girlfriend; Denise copes with Daniel's death in an odd way; tensions between Brad and Jeffrey come to a head; Bethany's mother, Bella (Delta Burke), renews her interest in Denny; Claire and Denny represent Lincoln for the murder of Judge Potts; Lincoln takes a peculiar interest in Shirley. (Part 1 of 2)
53	9	"On the Ledge"	Bill D'Elia	David E. Kelley	November 28, 2006	3AJQ09
Paul, Denise, Jeffrey, Brad and Claire try to discover what happened to Shirley, who attempts to reason with her kidnapper, Lincoln; Jerry's legal skills shine as he and Alan continue to defend a woman accused of killing her ex-girlfriend; Denny becomes jealous when he sees Alan and Jerry smoking on the balcony. (Part 2 of 2)
54	10	"The Nutcrackers"	John Terlesky	Phoef Sutton, Stanford Golden, Karen Wyscarver and David E. Kelley	December 5, 2006	3AJQ10
Alan bets Shirley on a case involving parents raising their twin daughters as a white supremacist musical act; Denise, Brad, and Jeffrey take a case for a woman (Loretta Devine) who wants to sue God for the death of her husband; Clarice/Clarence returns in search of a job, but Claire will only hire Clarence; Denny represents a worried mother trying to retain custody of her anorexic daughter, but his oddball behavior causes Alan to worry about the case.
55	11	"Angel of Death"	Tom Verica	Craig Turk and David E. Kelley and Janet Leahy	January 9, 2007	3AJQ11
Denny and Alan, joined by ambitious New York associate Vanessa Walker (Nia Long), head to New Orleans to defend a doctor accused of euthanizing patients during Hurricane Katrina; Claire Simms' new secretary, the cross-dressing Clarence, wants to file a lawsuit when he is kicked out of an all-women's gym; Denise Bauer weighs the pros and cons of dating Jeffrey Coho.
56	12	"Nuts"	Adam Arkin	Janet Leahy, David E. Kelley and Andrew Kreisberg	January 16, 2007	3AJQ12
Denny, dismayed to learn his name is on the federal No Fly List, asks for Alan Shore's help in taking on Homeland Security; Shirley and Vanessa Walker (Nia Long) defend a third-grade teacher charged with wrongful death after her student has a fatal allergic reaction in class; the cross-dressing Clarence adopts yet another persona.
57	13	"Dumping Bella"	Eric Stoltz	David E. Kelley and Sanford Golden	January 30, 2007	3AJQ13
When animal-rights activists attack Bella, Denny prepares to face the protesters and their vindictive lawyer Bethany; Brad suspects that he is not the only person in the office enjoying a friends-with-benefits relationship with Denise.
58	14	"Selling Sickness"	Andrew Bernstein	Corinne Brinkerhoff and Andrew Kreisberg	February 6, 2007	3AJQ14
Judge Brown turns to Crane, Poole & Schmidt when he sues a company for not curing his homosexuality; when Clifford Cabot's (Ed Begley, Jr.) teenage niece is sexually assaulted, Shirley is hired to prevent her from taking an experimental memory-erasing drug; Denise hunts for the father of her baby.
59	15	"Fat Burner"	Steve Robin	Janet Leahy and Michael Reisz	February 13, 2007	3AJQ15
Alan defends Denny for smuggling fat overseas to be made into fuel; Clarence tries his first case with Paul and Bethany, a first degree murder where a Haitian restavec brought to America killed her employer, a man who allegedly planned to sell her child into slavery; Jeffery Coho decides to leave the firm. * Final appearance of Jeffrey Coho
60	16	"The Good Lawyer"	Michael Pressman	David E. Kelley and Michael Reisz	February 20, 2007	3AJQ16
Alan defends two clients in separate cases: a woman who stole the plasticized body of her father from an art museum and a therapist who is fired from his hospital job after telling patients about his beliefs in UFOs; in the latter case, the hospital is defended by Jerry Espenson, whose new-found confidence Alan must shake in order to win the case; Clarence Bell gets distracted over an invitation from Claire to come over to her place for a dinner date; Denise & Brad continue to discuss the situation between them; Bethany forces Denny to go to temple with her.
61	17	"The Bride Wore Blood"	Mike Listo	David E. Kelley and Susan Dickes	March 20, 2007	3AJQ17
Alan Shore defends Renata Hill (Megan Mullally), an ex-girlfriend and former coworker who is arrested in the courtroom hallway, covered in blood and accused of murdering her fiancée; Claire defends, by court-order, a man charged with stealing a cell phone (Lovensky Jean-Baptiste) against Warren Peters, now an ADA; Denny and Bethany have a falling out over Denny's views on Israeli politics and Bethany's Judaism.
62	18	"Son of the Defender"	Bill D'Elia	David E. Kelley and Phoef Sutton	April 3, 2007	3AJQ18
Fifty years after Denny and his father successfully defended a man accused of murder, the son of the victim seeks revenge by holding the law firm hostage and forcing them to "retry" the case; flashbacks of Denny and his father are taken from "The Defender", a 1957 episode of the series Studio One in Hollywood, in which William Shatner's character, Kenneth Preston, sparred with his lawyer father, Walter (Ralph Bellamy), who is convinced of their client's guilt; Alan defends his neighbor and the state senator found in bed with her on charges of prostitution and soliciting.
63	19	"Brotherly Love"	Robert Yannetti	David E. Kelley	April 10, 2007	3AJQ19
Alan and Denny defend a shady lawyer (Frank Whaley) charged with obstructing justice for trying to cover up the murder committed by his brother; Brad refuses to sign a love contract required by the firm, even though his decision could mean dismissal; Claire's relationship with Clarence faces tough hurdles; Denny tries a positive thinking philosophy because he is convinced he will get Raquel Welch into his life.
64	20	"Guise 'n Dolls"	John Terlesky	Sanford Golden, David E. Kelley and Karen Wyscarver	April 24, 2007	3AJQ20
Alan and Jerry Espenson go head-to-head in a case of a woman suing a family-oriented department store for selling “pornographic” dolls to children; Shirley and Paul have to decide the future of their friend and partner Denny after he makes a politically incorrect statement towards a prospective African-American employee (Jaleel White); Denise reconsiders her future relationship with Brad after listening to her colleague’s opinion on the matter.
65	21	"Tea and Sympathy"	Jeff Bleckner	Sanford Golden, Brooke Roberts and Karen Wyscarver	May 1, 2007	3AJQ21
Shirley and Claire represent a man cured of HIV whose blood has been patented by his doctor; Judge Gloria Weldon (Gail O'Grady) asks for Alan's help when she is charged for drug possession; Clarence goes up against Jerry Espenson when he represents a girl kicked out of her sorority for being socially awkward; Brad and Denise face further conflict in their relationship when Brad wants to wear his military uniform to their wedding.
66	22	"Guantanamo by the Bay"	James Bagdonas	David E. Kelley	May 8, 2007	3AJQ22
Alan Shore sues the United States on behalf of a client who was tortured for two years at Guantanamo Bay; the judge in the Guantanamo case, Marianna Folger (Bernadette Peters), causes complications in the sexual relationship between Alan and Judge Gloria Weldon; Jerry Espenson begs Shirley to let him have his job back at the firm – despite the fact that he had once threatened to kill her.
67	23	"Duck and Cover"	Mike Listo	Susan Dickes and Michael Reisz	May 15, 2007	3AJQ23
Brad and Denise's marriage is interrupted by the FBI; Alan Shore defends a priest who is accused of harbouring illegal immigrants; Denise goes into labour and Brad is determined to get married before the child is born; Jerry Espenson is asked to defend a tenant against her landlord; Denny shoots at a duck and borrows The Stanley Cup. * Final regular appearance of Denise Bauer
68	24	"Trial of the Century"	Bill D'Elia	David E. Kelley and Corinne Brinkerhoff	May 29, 2007	3AJQ24
Alan and Denny represent two brothers accused of killing their abusive father; Clarence and Jerry Espenson take on a huge gambling establishment when a woman alleges that her out-of-control gambling debts were the fault of the casino. * Final regular appearance of Paul Lewiston * Final appearance of Claire Simms

=== Season 4 (2007–08) ===
No. overall	No. in season	Title	Directed by	Written by	Original release date	Prod. code
69	1	"Beauty and the Beast"	Bill D'Elia	David E. Kelley	September 25, 2007	4AJQ01
Shirley is sued by Stanford University after she reneges on a $3 million donation, and she asks Alan to represent her – only to find him useless against an old flame and opposing counsel, Lorraine Weller (Saffron Burrows); Alan's problems are compounded by Judge Gloria Weldon's desire to be pregnant by him; Denny is arrested for solicitation, but is more enraged to learn that his nemesis, senior partner Carl Sack (John Larroquette), has transferred to Boston to run litigation; Junior associate and recent Harvard-grad Katie Lloyd tries her first case, a murder trial, with Jerry Espenson; Clarence gets into hot water for entering a dance competition as Clarice. * First appearances of Carl Sack, Katie Lloyd and Loraine Weller
70	2	"The Innocent Man"	Mike Listo	David E. Kelley & Susan Dickes	October 2, 2007	4AJQ02
Lorraine Weller (Saffron Burrows) is hired to work in litigation at the firm, drawing attention from both Alan and Denny; Joseph Washington's trial begins, and Katie, Jerry and Alan defend him; Judge Weldon awaits Alan's decision about fathering her baby. * Final appearance of Brad Chase
71	3	"The Chicken and the Leg"	James Bagdonas	David E. Kelley & Lawrence Broch	October 9, 2007	4AJQ03
Carl defends a man who runs an illegal cockfighting tournament, and Denny is so convinced that he will lose that he bets an extreme amount of money on it; Alan and Lorraine sue a high school for teaching abstinence-only sex education after a 15-year-old student contracts HIV; Katie and Jerry represent a woman claiming a psychologist caused her husband to commit suicide.
72	4	"Do Tell"	Steve Robin	Phoef Sutton & Lawrence Broch & David E. Kelley	October 16, 2007	4AJQ04
Alan's word salad returns, but he refuses to acknowledge the cause; Shirley represents Denny's friend, General "Fitz" Fitzgerald, who is threatened of being discharged from the Army after he revealed his homosexuality; Whitney Rome (Taraji P. Henson) arrives at the firm from New York, and Carl assigns her and Katie to take over the custody battle over a nine-year-old bullfighter. * First appearance of Whitney Rome
73	5	"Hope and Gory"	Robert Yannetti	David E. Kelley	October 30, 2007	4AJQ05
Patrice Kelly (Mare Winningham) seeks Alan's advice on how to kill her child's murderer after he is acquitted at trial; Katie and Jerry travel to a small town to challenge Megan's Law on behalf of Joseph Washington, who is being persecuted over his criminal record; Lorraine tries to help Alan with his word salad.
74	6	"The Object of My Affection"	Eric Stoltz	David E. Kelley & Corinne Brinkerhoff	November 6, 2007	4AJQ06
Alan attempts to prove that Patrice Kelly (Mare Winningham) was temporarily insane when she killed the man who murdered her daughter; everyone thinks Denny has finally lost it when he fires an associate lawyer for being fat; Jerry Espenson (who has Asperger syndrome) helps objectophile Leigh Swift (Mary Gross) (who also has Asperger syndrome) to locate her lost love – a utility box.
75	7	"Attack of the Xenophobes"	John Terlesky	David E. Kelley & Craig Turk	November 13, 2007	4AJQ07
Alan helps Denny defend himself in court when he is sued for firing an associate for being fat; Whitney Rome and Katie Lloyd take on a murder case in which the DA plans to use a functional MRI as evidence to prove that the accused former cop is a racist; Carl Sack represents Clarence when he sues an online site for posting an unflattering video of him as "Clarice"; Jerry is overcome with anxiety when he feels it's time to give his very first kiss to former client Leigh, who, like he, has Asperger syndrome: she is an objectophile whom he has been dating; Alan mulls over the thought of having a real, adult relationship with Lorraine Weller.
76	8	"Oral Contracts"	Mike Listo	David E. Kelley	December 4, 2007	4AJQ08
Denny is arrested for solicitation – reminiscent of the Larry Craig scandal – and Alan defends him, with Carl Sack and Paul Lewiston keeping a close eye on the proceedings; Shirley goes up against Bethany when she represents a veteran radio shock jock who was fired for his antics; Whitney and Katie begin to suspect Lorraine is hiding a secret.
77	9	"No Brains Left Behind"	Stephen Cragg	Lawrence Broch & Susan Dickes & David E. Kelley	December 11, 2007	4AJQ09
When her granddaughter is expelled for protesting the No Child Left Behind Act, Shirley and Whitney sue to get her back in; Alan and Denny sue the National Guard for failing to protect a famous pizza restaurant from a flood; Fearing she has violated a moral clause in her contract, Lorraine comes clean to Shirley about her past; Feeling ineffective, Carl tells Shirley he wants to go back to New York.
78	10	"Green Christmas"	Lou Antonio	David E. Kelley & Craig Turk & Sanford Golden & Karen Wyscarver	December 18, 2007	4AJQ10
Carl and Katie defend the firm after Denny lied to a client about the offices being 'green'; Leigh dumps Jerry for an iPhone; Alan takes on a bank threatening to foreclose Clarence's home as part of the Subprime mortgage crisis; Carl makes a decision about Lorraine's future at the firm.
79	11	"Mad About You"	Tom Verica	David E. Kelley & Lawrence Broch	January 15, 2008	4AJQ11
Denny takes on a high-profile murder case, refuses help from Alan and while Denny basks in the spotlight, Shirley Schmidt, Carl Sack and the rest of the firm fear the personal and professional embarrassment from Denny's latest crusade for relevancy; Jerry Espenson and Katie Lloyd are assigned to the case of a woman who wants to sue her husband's law firm for causing their divorce by advertising that divorce is the answer to all marital problems.
80	12	"Roe vs Wade, The Musical"	Steve Robin	David E. Kelley & Susan Dickes	January 22, 2008	4AJQ12
Shirley and Katie represent Missy Tiggs (Meredith Patterson), who is being sued by Alan on behalf of a client who wants a court order for her to have an abortion after stealing his sperm; Jerry represents Leigh, who was fired for hugging one of her students.
81	13	"Glow In The Dark"	Vondie Curtis-Hall	David E. Kelley & Lawrence Broch	February 12, 2008	4AJQ13
The firm represents Andrea, a sexually adventurous friend of Shirley's trying to prevent the construction of a nuclear power plant in her town and Shirley is shocked when opposing counsel turns out to be Jack Ross (Scott Bakula), an old flame; after having sex with a stranger, Denny asks Alan to agree to an intimate arrangement; when Leigh threatens Katie, Katie tries to convince Jerry that she is insane.
82	14	"Rescue Me"	Mike Listo	David E. Kelley & Corinne Brinkerhoff & Susan Dickes	February 19, 2008	4AJQ14
The sexually adventurous Andrea once again secures the services of the firm and Carl Sack when she sues a company that was supposed to turn her mother's ashes into a diamond for misplacing the ashes and giving her cubic zirconia instead; Katie Lloyd falls for a client with AIDS who is charged with check forgery; Clarence Bell takes on the case of a woman suing her pastor for causing her to lose her faith after he ends an affair with her; Whitney Rome sets out to sue a high school for causing the death of a woman's daughter who was sleep deprived due to a heavy school workload; Denny Crane and Alan Shore prepare to take the Coast Guard test.
83	15	"Tabloid Nation"	Bill D'Elia	David E. Kelley	April 8, 2008	4AJQ15
Alan and Jerry go up against Melvin Palmer (Christopher Rich) again when they represent Harry Beckham, a man suing a production company after his daughter was murdered following a talk show stunt; Shirley begins to suspect her friend, Ethan (Stephen Root), is unstable when she learns he has been arrested ten times for shooting seals in Boston Harbor; Denny, despite Sack's warnings, tries a stunt to win Shirley's affection; Lorraine suggests Alan see a psychiatrist after he tells her a dark childhood secret.
84	16	"The Mighty Rogues"	Arlene Sanford	Story by : David E. Kelley & Lawrence Broch & Jill Goldsmith; Teleplay by : David E. Kelley & Lawrence Broch	April 15, 2008	4AJQ16
Shirley and Denny visit her Alzheimer's stricken father after he breaks several ribs from jumping out his hospital room window. When the doctor refuses to place him on a morphine drip, Shirley takes him to court and has Alan represent her; Carl Sack and Lorraine represent Nantucket when they want to build a nuclear bomb for protection; Jerry's new girlfriend, Dana Strickland (Rachelle Lefevre), sues him for sexual assault.
85	17	"The Court Supreme"	Robert Yanetti	David E. Kelley & Jonathan Shapiro	April 22, 2008	4AJQ17
Alan, Denny and Sack travel to the Supreme Court to argue a death penalty case on behalf of a man who raped a young girl; Lorraine divulges information about Jerry's new girlfriend, Dana, to Katie.
86	18	"Indecent Proposals"	Mike Listo	Craig Turk & Jill Goldsmith & David E. Kelley	April 30, 2008	4AJQ18
When Shirley's nephew, a Democratic delegate, refuses to vote for Hillary Clinton despite her winning the popular vote in Massachusetts, Alan and Shirley sue the Democratic National Party to try to halt the abuse of power; Denny falls for a female rancher, Sunny Fields (Christine Ebersole) and asks Sack to represent her against the FDA to prevent the sale of cloned meat.
87	19	"The Gods Must Be Crazy"	Jeff Bleckner	David E. Kelley & Jill Goldsmith	May 14, 2008	4AJQ19
Shirley and Carl represent Renee Winger (Missi Pyle), who wants to sue the Catholic church when they will not ordain her as a priest; when Dana is arrested for prostitution, she asks for Jerry's help, but Jerry and Katie face difficulty when the DA wants to flip Dana for her boss, Lorraine; Denny is approached by Paul Cruickshank (George Segal) on behalf of several high-ranking politicos who want him to run as a last-minute presidential candidate.
88	20	"Patriot Acts"	Bill D'Elia	David E. Kelley & Jonathan Shapiro & Sanford Golden & Karen Wyscarver	May 21, 2008	4AJQ20
Alan is approached by Judge Harvey Cooper (Anthony Heald) on behalf of Concord, Massachusetts, who want him to represent them in their attempt to secede from the United States. Alan takes the case, offending Denny, who appears in court representing the United States; Alan and Denny are accepted into the Coast Guard. Final appearances of Clarence Bell, Loraine Weller and Whitney Rome

=== Season 5 (2008) ===
No. overall	No. in season	Title	Directed by	Written by	Original release date	Prod. code
89	1	"Smoke Signals"	Bill D'Elia	David E. Kelley	September 22, 2008	5AJQ01
Alan finds himself distracted by an old flame, Phoebe Prentice (Ally Walker), while assisting Bethany Horowitz in a case against a large tobacco company; Denny is distraught and concerned that he may be becoming impotent.
90	2	"Guardians and Gatekeepers"	Mike Listo	Corinne Brinkerhoff, Sanford Golden, Karen Wyscarver & David E. Kelley	September 29, 2008	5AJQ02
Carl defends Shirley's granddaughter when she votes in the presidential primary while underage; Denny and Alan sue a pharmaceutical company; Jerry and Katie take a case against a privately run prison which is represented by Melvin Palmer.
91	3	"Dances With Wolves"	Jim Bagdonas	David E. Kelley & Susan Dickes	October 6, 2008	5AJQ03
Denny is arrested on concealed-weapon charges after shooting a man who tried to mug him and Jerry. Sack and Jerry defend him, but Sack is put off by Jerry and Denny's alternate agenda for the case; when Alan represents Joanna, a sexual surrogate, in a custody battle for her daughter, he tries to come to terms with the accusation that he is sexist.
92	4	"True Love"	Steve Robin	David E. Kelley	October 13, 2008	5AJQ04
When Phoebe (Ally Walker) hires Alan to help her husband, Robert, beat a murder charge, he faces a moral and professional dilemma when his lingering feelings for her elicit a secret desire for Robert to be convicted. Phoebe does whatever she can to keep her family together.
93	5	"The Bad Seed"	Bob Yanetti	Lawrence Broch, Susan Dickes & David E. Kelley	October 20, 2008	5AJQ05
Alan and Shirley prepare for an uphill fight with the military and the precedent of Feres v. United States on behalf of a man whose brother died in a military hospital under suspicious circumstances; Jerry helps his sister Joy (Annie Potts) to find out whether or not her son and his girlfriend are from the same sperm donor.
94	6	"Happy Trails"	Mike Listo	David E. Kelley & Corrine Brinkerhoff	October 27, 2008	5AJQ06
Denny and Alan visit a dude ranch in Utah, but find themselves in trouble with their tour group and the local authorities, and are defended by Melvin Palmer; back in Boston, Shirley defends Catherine Piper after she unintentionally "blows up" her doctor when she sets his office on fire in revenge for prescribing her drugs that gave her a heart attack; Katie helps Carl find his inner child.
95	7	"Mad Cows"	Steve Robin	David E. Kelley	November 3, 2008	5AJQ10
Alan and Denny go up against Denise Bauer and the USDA when they represent a cattle rancher, Carol Hober (Valerie Bertinelli) who is suing the government for not allowing her to test all her livestock for Mad Cow Disease; Jerry is up for partner but the panel of partners deciding his fate, including Paul Lewiston, see his social inadequacies as a problem; Alan and Denny argue about politics on the eve of the election. Final appearance of Denise Bauer.
96	8	"Roe"	Bill D'Elia	David E. Kelley	November 10, 2008	5AJQ08
Alan ignites controversy in the firm when he represents a 15-year-old girl who needs an injunction to get an abortion; Jerry punches an obnoxious patron in the face after the patron calls him a "demento" while standing in line at a coffee shop. Jerry faces assault charges for his actions.
97	9	"Kill, Baby, Kill"	Bob Yannetti	Lawrence Broch & David E. Kelley	November 17, 2008	5AJQ09
At the request of another lawyer, Denny and Carl travel to Virginia to defend a corrections officer who shot a death row inmate out of mercy after his execution went awry; Alan once again tries to push a relationship with Shirley when they represent a woman, Martha Headly (Cheri Oteri) who was fired for voting for John McCain.
98	10	"Thanksgiving"	Mike Listo	David E. Kelley	November 24, 2008	5AJQ11
Although she wants a quiet reprieve from the significant financial woes facing the firm, Shirley's intimate Thanksgiving get-together with Carl turns into a dysfunctional family affair when she invites Alan, Denny, Jerry, and Katie – as well as cocky attorney Melvin Palmer, emotionally unstable law partner Edwin Poole (Larry Miller) and his nine-year-old foster son, who tried to mug her – to join them in the feast.
99	11	"Juiced"	Michael Lohmann	Corinne Brinkerhoff, Susan Dickes & David E. Kelley	December 1, 2008	5AJQ07
After Denny learns some disturbing news about the progression of his Alzheimer's disease and that an experimental drug which could slow his deterioration is available but not FDA approved, Alan tries to convince the Massachusetts Supreme Court to let his best friend have access to it; the murderous Catherine Piper (Betty White) returns, and convinces Carl to take her lawsuit against the TV networks for not creating any programming for people over 50; Jerry and Katie take on the case of an ambitious student (Margo Harshman) fighting to maintain her acceptance to Harvard after being disqualified for using a brain-enhancing drug during her SATs.
100	12	"Made In China"	Bill D'Elia	Story by : David E. Kelley, Susan Dickes & Lauren Mackenzie; Teleplay by : David E. Kelley	December 8, 2008	5AJQ12
Denny and Shirley are outraged when they discover Paul and the managing partners have negotiated for Crane, Poole & Schmidt to be purchased by a Chinese-run law firm. Shirley, Denny and Carl sue the partners in an attempt to stop the merger, only to find the fate of the entire litigation department at risk; the firm has to face the reality of Denny's worsening Alzheimer's when he breaks in to the house of his neighbour, Penelope Kimball (Bess Armstrong); Alan, Jerry and Katie prep for the Supreme Court appeal on Denny's drug case; Denny has a surprising question for Alan.
101	13	"Last Call"	Bill D'Elia	Story by : David E. Kelley & Susan Dickes; Teleplay by : David E. Kelley	December 8, 2008	5AJQ13
Alan and Denny find themselves sued by gay rights groups for their decision to get married; Paul Lewiston is assigned by the new owners to oversee the litigation department as they change Crane, Poole & Schmidt's name; Carl and Shirley find themselves fighting in the lead up to their wedding; Alan and Denny travel to Washington to argue their drug case before the Supreme Court.
