= List of Boston Legal characters =

Boston Legal is an American legal-comedy-drama created by David E. Kelley. The series, starring James Spader, with Candice Bergen, and William Shatner, was produced in association with 20th Century Fox Television for the ABC. Boston Legal aired from October 3, 2004, to December 8, 2008. The series is a spin-off of the Kelley series The Practice, and features Practice actors including Spader, Rhona Mitra, Lake Bell, and Shatner. It is set at the legal firm of Crane, Poole & Schmidt.

== The Practice characters ==
The following characters originated during the eighth season of The Practice, before appearing as part of Boston Legal's regular ensemble. Both Spader and Mitra were main Practice cast members, while Lake Bell and William Shatner recurred in the series' final episodes.

Character	Portrayed by	Occupation	Seasons					
Character	Portrayed by	Occupation	The Practice	Boston Legal				
Character	Portrayed by	Occupation	8	1	2	3	4	5
Alan Shore	James Spader	Associate	Main	Main	Main	Main	Main	Main
Tara Wilson	Rhona Mitra	Associate	Main	Main	Guest			
Sally Heep	Lake Bell	Associate	Guest	Main		Guest		
Denny Crane	William Shatner	Named Managing Partner	Guest	Main	Main	Main	Main	Main

=== Alan Shore ===
Alan Shore
- Boston Legal character
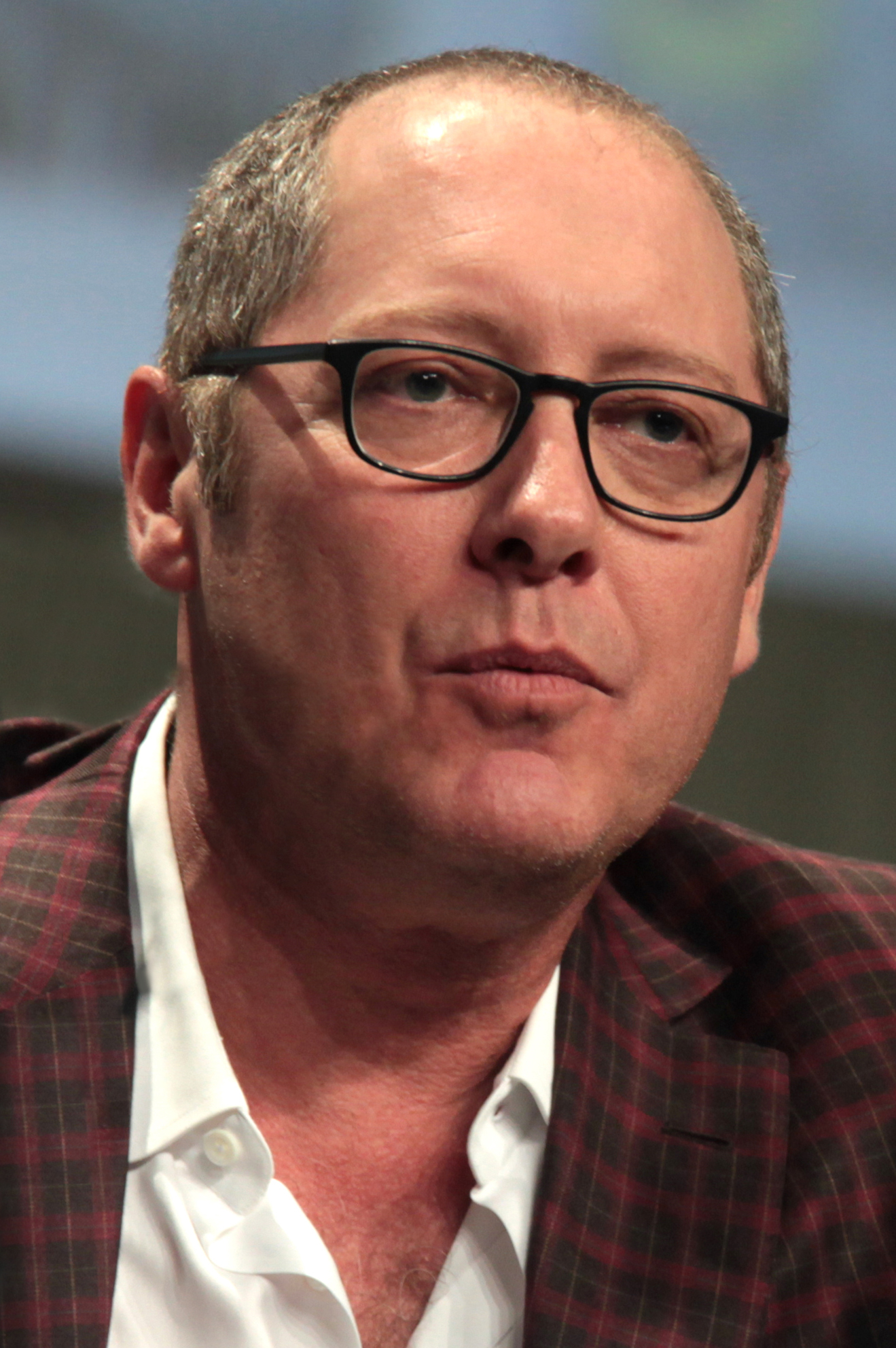
- First appearance: "We the People" (The Practice)
- Created by: David E. Kelley
- Portrayed by: James Spader
- Date of birth: November 4, 1962 (age 63)
- Place of birth: Dedham, Massachusetts, U.S.

In-universe information
- Full name: Alan Shore
- Species: Human
- Gender: Male
- Occupation: Lawyer, Counsel at Crane, Poole, & Schmidt; Associate of Crane, Poole & Schmidt; Formerly at Young, Frutt & Berlutti, Howard & Brock, and Carruthers-Abbott firms
- Family: Peter Shore (father); Mrs Shore (mother); Unnamed sibling
- Spouse: Mary Shore (girlfriend/wife)
- Significant other: Denny Crane
- Children: Dominik Shore (adoptive son); Alan Shore, Jr. (son)
- Relatives: Great-great-grandfather; Jack Shore (great-grandfather); Monica Shore (grandmother); Greg, Frank, Steve and Luke (nephews); Unnamed grandmother-in-law John Shore (father-in-law); Susan Shore (mother-in-law); Marc Shore (brother-in-law); Tom Shore (uncle-in-law); Herny Shore (uncle-in-law); William Shore (uncle-in-law); Charles Shore (uncle-in-law); Auntie Violeta Shore (aunt-in-law); Magdalena Shore (cousin-in-law); Elizabeth Shore (cousin-in-law); Mariana Shore (niece-in-law); Sylvana Shore (sister-in-law)
- Origin: Dedham, Massachusetts
- Boston Legal seasons: various
- The Practice seasons: various

Alan Shore is a brilliant lawyer with a strong moral core who nevertheless is not above obtaining ethical outcomes through unethical means. Illicit computer hacking, blackmail, disguise and bribery are all tools he uses without hesitation. Alan is, however, unwavering in his defense of the underdog (unless he is representing the other party). He is disappointed and disillusioned with how the country has changed in recent years, and routinely confronts these issues in open court. Wherever he works, he treats his coworkers with levity and refuses to take himself too seriously. Alan suffers from night terrors, has a fear of clowns, and gave up his home, preferring instead to live in hotels. He has resigned himself to the fact that he will never be made partner at the firm due to his unpredictable behavior and lack of trustworthiness; while the managing partners of Crane, Poole & Schmidt do not fully trust Alan, they do recognize his talent as an attorney. Alan is best friends with (and later husband of) Denny Crane despite their sharp differences in political ideologies.

=== Tara Wilson ===
Tara Wilson
- Boston Legal character
- First appearance: "We the People" (The Practice)
- Last appearance: "Finding Nimmo"
- Portrayed by: Rhona Mitra

In-universe information
- Boston Legal seasons: 1, 2
- The Practice seasons: 8

Tara Wilson first appeared as a paralegal at Young, Frutt & Berlutti. Fired from the firm after notifying Alan of his impending dismissal, Tara is hired to work at Crane, Poole & Schmidt, the firm representing Alan's civil case. Subsequently, she became a lawyer. Tara and Alan finally began a sexual relationship following his break-up with Sally Heep, though their relationship hit a rocky patch when he hired a group of men to attack a man he had previously fought with. When Tara reconnects with one of her ex-boyfriends, the two break up, and she promptly resigns from Crane, Poole & Schmidt. Her departure leads to Alan questioning his emotional suitability for a relationship.

=== Sally Heep ===
Sally Heep
- Boston Legal character
- First appearance: "The Firm" (The Practice)
- Last appearance: "The Verdict"
- Portrayed by: Lake Bell

In-universe information
- Boston Legal seasons: 1, 3
- The Practice seasons: 8

Sally Heep first appeared as an associate at Crane, Poole & Schmidt. Introduced in The Practice, Sally began a relationship with Alan that crossed over into Boston Legal. However, after he used her to get information from a witness against their client so they could suppress his testimony, she broke up with him. Shortly after Shirley took over the Boston offices, she fired Sally for repeated errors in case preparation that called her competence as a lawyer into question. Sally returns in Season three as opposing counsel (“Whose God Is It Anyway?” and “The Verdict”).

=== Denny Crane ===
Denny Crane
- Boston Legal character
- First appearance: "War of the Roses" (The Practice)
- Last appearance: "Last Call"
- Portrayed by: William Shatner

In-universe information
- Boston Legal seasons: 1, 2, 3, 4, 5
- The Practice seasons: 8

A named partner of Crane, Poole & Schmidt, Dennis 'Denny' Crane is a renowned attorney of some fifty years of practice who claims he has never lost a case, and never will. He is an eccentric who considers himself a legend and loves to say his own name to "sign" his verbal utterances. In one of the final episodes of The Practice, he explained that often people don't believe they're in the room with a legend, so he says his own name to let them know it's true. Denny suffers from memory loss and confusion as part of the early stages of Alzheimer's disease, but often refers to his troubles as "mad cow disease" when his utterances are confusing to others or when he himself becomes confused. While he is still trying cases frequently as late as Season 1 of Boston Legal, by Season 2, he seems to have lost most of his talent for complex litigation, though he still shows flair in appealing to a jury in closing arguments. By Season 3 he mostly serves as a figurehead at the firm, rarely trying cases and appearing in court more often as a plaintiff and defendant due to his antics. When he does appear in court as a lawyer in later seasons, however, he still performs well.

Denny is a conservative who loves firearms and believes gun control is for "communists". He also refuses to defend anyone who is accused of extremely heinous acts; in one episode, he shoots a client because of the nature of his crime (raping and murdering a child). This is just one of several people he shoots over the course of the series, with several characters saying that Denny "shoots people". Denny enjoys an extremely close friendship with Alan Shore, is also a womanizer like Alan, and has no problem sleeping with the wives of judges and clients. Though he marries another woman in Season 2 (from whom he is quickly divorced after engaging in an act of infidelity at their wedding reception), he still pines for Shirley Schmidt. Denny and Alan marry in the series finale.

== Boston Legal characters ==
The following characters first appeared in Boston Legal, and formed part of the regular ensemble. The original cast includes Spader, Bell, Mitra, Shatner, Monica Potter, and Mark Valley. Candice Bergen joined the ensemble during season one, while René Auberjonois recurred for a short time before being promoted to series regular. Julie Bowen, Justin Mentell and Ryan Michelle Bathe joined the series in the second season, while Craig Bierko, Constance Zimmer, and Gary Anthony Williams first appeared in season three. John Larroquette, Saffron Burrows, Tara Summers, and Taraji Henson joined the series in season four, as did Christian Clemenson, who had recurred since season two.

Character	Portrayed by	Occupation	Seasons				
Character	Portrayed by	Occupation	1	2	3	4	5
Lori Colson	Monica Potter	Junior Partner	Main	Guest			
Brad Chase	Mark Valley	Junior Partner	Main	Main	Main	Guest	
Shirley Schmidt	Candice Bergen	Named Managing Partner	Main	Main	Main	Main	Main
Paul Lewiston	René Auberjonois	Managing Partner	Main	Main	Main	Guest	Guest
Denise Bauer	Julie Bowen	Senior Associate		Main	Main		Guest
Garrett Wells	Justin Mentell	Associate		Main			
Sara Holt	Ryan Michelle Bathe	Associate		Main			
Jeffrey Coho	Craig Bierko	Junior Partner			Main		
Claire Simms	Constance Zimmer	Associate			Main		
Clarence Bell	Gary Anthony Williams	Associate			Main	Main	
Carl Sack	John Larroquette	Managing Partner				Main	Main
Jerry Espenson	Christian Clemenson	Junior Partner		Recurring	Recurring	Main	Main
Katie Lloyd	Tara Summers	Associate				Main	Main
Lorraine Weller	Saffron Burrows	Associate				Main	
Whitney Rome	Taraji P. Henson	Associate				Main	

=== Lori Colson ===
Lori Colson
- Boston Legal character
- First appearance: "Head Cases"
- Last appearance: "Men to Boys"
- Portrayed by: Monica Potter

In-universe information
- Seasons: 1, 2

A junior partner at Crane, Poole & Schmidt and former prosecutor, Lori Colson found herself inexplicably attracted to Alan during the first season. Initially, Lori focuses her efforts on practicing civil law, though after working with Edwin Poole she becomes more comfortable with criminal cases, believing them to be incredibly rewarding emotionally. Though she was close friends with Shirley Schmidt, she files a sexual harassment claim against Denny Crane in the first season. Denny later apologized to Lori, though she departed the firm shortly thereafter. Alan later comments that Shirley had "ushered" Lori out, suggesting she resigned under significant pressure from the managing partners.

=== Brad Chase ===
Brad Chase
- Boston Legal character
- First appearance: "Head Cases"
- Last appearance: "The Innocent Man"
- Portrayed by: Mark Valley

In-universe information
- Seasons: 1, 2, 3, 4

Brad Chase is the man who the others turn to when they need something done. He often relies on his Marine Corps background to both intimidate others and undertake physically demanding tasks. Brad is a self-proclaimed homophobe, and though he had hated Alan initially, he later became slightly more tolerant of him. In the second season, Brad becomes a partner at the firm, though he finds his job at risk when he offers to pay Denny's fiancée not to marry him. Brad initially had a strong relationship with Lori Colson, though upon her departure from the firm he grows close to Denise Bauer. The two later have a child together, and marry shortly after. Shortly after the third season, he leaves the firm to begin work as an Assistant District Attorney.

=== Shirley Schmidt ===
Shirley Schmidt
- Boston Legal character
- First appearance: "Schmidt Happens"
- Last appearance: "Last Call"
- Portrayed by: Candice Bergen

In-universe information
- Seasons: 1, 2, 3, 4, 5

Shirley Schmidt is a named partner of Crane, Poole & Schmidt, a firm she founded with partners Denny Crane and Edwin Poole. With a propensity to remind her younger colleagues that she's "Schmidt", Shirley is tasked with reining in Denny's preposterous behavior, directing litigation, and practicing law. Prior to founding her firm, Shirley attended Wellesley College where she met her share of intelligent Harvard students. She spent a significant amount of time in New York, before being called to Boston by Paul Lewiston. Shirley used to have a romantic relationship with Denny, a past she now views with sardonic detachment, often making jokes about it. She is portrayed as extremely desirable in the series: smart, sexy, and sought after by many of the men around her, including her ex-husband Ivan Tiggs and fellow lawyers Denny, Alan, Jeffrey Coho and Carl Sack. She eventually marries Carl Sack in the series finale.

=== Paul Lewiston ===
Paul Lewiston
- Boston Legal character
- First appearance: "Head Cases"
- Last appearance: "Last Call"
- Portrayed by: René Auberjonois

In-universe information
- Seasons: 1, 2, 3, 4, 5

Paul Lewiston is a managing partner of the Boston office and legal advisor of Crane, Poole & Schmidt. Paul is skilled in client relations and is an expert in Far Eastern markets and legal problems of corporations doing business in that part of the world. Unlike Denny and Alan, Paul generally does things strictly "by the book." He has had several antagonistic run-ins with Denny and Alan over their apparent lack of respect for the law. His middle-aged daughter, Rachel, is introduced in Season 2 as a meth addict, and Paul has her abducted and placed in a rehab center. He takes custody of her daughter (his granddaughter) Fiona. After this, being tied up with parenting his grandchild, he is seldom seen in the Boston office. It was Lewiston who negotiated the acquisition of Crane, Poole & Schmidt by a Chinese law firm in the series finale, though he later begins to regret this action.

=== Denise Bauer ===
Denise Bauer
- Boston Legal character
- First appearance: "The Black Widow"
- Last appearance: "Mad Cows"
- Portrayed by: Julie Bowen

In-universe information
- Seasons: 2, 3, 5

Denise Bauer was introduced as an aggressive young attorney at the start of the show's second season. A senior associate at Crane, Poole & Schmidt, Denise is thrown when, on her first day in Boston, her husband files for divorce and insists that she pay him so he can live while setting up his career as a mediocre golf pro. Her distractions over the divorce cause her trouble with some cases, though she later settles on compensating her husband with a single-time alimony payment of one hundred thousand dollars. In season two, Denise begins a relationship with a terminally ill man named Daniel Post, a romance that leads to her travelling to a haunted house to retrieve his head following his death. Denise's first professional blow is delivered when she is passed over for partnership in Spring 2006, despite being considered a safe bet. In season three, Denise discovers she is pregnant with Brad's baby, and as of the seventeenth episode, she had decided to have the baby. She later marries Brad Chase, and after taking extended maternity leave, accepts a partner position at a different law firm. She later returns as opposing counsel. She is shown to be fluent in Italian.

=== Garrett Wells ===
Garrett Wells
- Boston Legal character
- First appearance: "The Black Widow"
- Last appearance: "Live Big"
- Portrayed by: Justin Mentell

In-universe information
- Seasons: 2

Garrett Wells was introduced in the second-season premiere as a brash young attorney who is obviously attracted to Denise. He does go over her head with some clients but aids her by blackmailing her ex-husband's attorney/pastor to get him to back down from his demands for money. He is not all that effective in the courtroom, being humiliated on more than one occasion by no-nonsense judges. He is also intimidated by Catherine Piper, the caterer and former assistant to Alan Shore, who actually runs him out of his own office. He is not seen after the end of Season 2. It is unclear whether he is still with the firm or was let go by the partners, absent any explanation. During season two he begins a relationship with a paralegal, initially bringing disgrace to the firm due to their mistimed sexual encounters.

=== Sara Holt ===
Sara Holt
- Boston Legal character
- First appearance: "The Black Widow"
- Last appearance: "Live Big"
- Portrayed by: Ryan Michelle Bathe

In-universe information
- Seasons: 2

Sara Holt is a smart lawyer who isn't above using her own beauty to help her client. A first year associate, Sara is shown to be good friends with her colleague Garrett Wells, and the two often conspire to win cases by unethical means - the most notable of which involved seducing and blackmailing a minister. Sara works primarily with Denise Bauer, though she entertains the idea of a relationship with Alan Shore, and the two date on one occasion. She departs the series in season two, absent any explanation.

=== Jeffrey Coho ===
Jeffrey Coho
- Boston Legal character
- First appearance: "New Kids on the Block"
- Last appearance: "Fat Burner"
- Portrayed by: Craig Bierko

In-universe information
- Seasons: 3

Jeffrey Coho is an intense, grandiose criminal defense attorney from the New York City branch of Crane, Poole & Schmidt who joins the Boston firm in Season 3, accompanied by Claire Simms. Jeffrey is as comfortable with making enemies as he is making friends. He had a fleeting relationship with Denise, and as such is cordially despised by Brad Chase. After finding out that Denise's baby is not his, Jeffrey leaves the firm in episode fifteen of Season three, wearing his Buzz Lightyear costume.

=== Claire Simms ===
Claire Simms
- Boston Legal character
- First appearance: "New Kids on the Block"
- Last appearance: "Trial of the Century"
- Portrayed by: Constance Zimmer

In-universe information
- Seasons: 3

Claire Sims is a smart, sexy lawyer who, along with Jeffrey Coho, joins the firm in the second episode of Season three. She did undercover work in the Scott Little case, and has a penchant for flirting with witnesses. Claire initiated a relationship with Clarence Bell, who was first her assistant and later a fellow associate. She was dropped following the end of season three, absent any explanation.

=== Clarence Bell ===
Clarence Bell
- Boston Legal character
- First appearance: "New Kids on the Block"
- Last appearance: "Patriot Acts"
- Portrayed by: Gary Anthony Williams

In-universe information
- Seasons: 3, 4

Also known as Clarice, Clevant and "Oprah." In his default persona, Clarence is hopelessly shy and introverted, and frequently has trouble maintaining eye contact. To deal with this drawback, he role-plays as other people who embody the characteristics he cannot. He originally sued his place of employment for gender discrimination. He is hired by CP&S as Claire Simms' assistant, and after it is discovered he is a law school graduate who has been admitted to the bar, he becomes an associate. For a time, he and Claire are an item. Joining the Litigation Division, he and Jerry Espenson become friends, and he enjoys something of a mentoring relationship with Carl Sack. He disappeared at the end of Season 4 with no explanation.

=== Carl Sack ===
Carl Sack
- Boston Legal character
- First appearance: "Beauty and the Beast"
- Last appearance: "Last Call"
- Portrayed by: John Laroquette

In-universe information
- Seasons: 4, 5

A senior partner at Crane, Poole & Schmidt, Carl transferred from the New York City office to help Shirley in managing the Boston branch following the withdrawal of Paul Lewiston from a leadership role to concentrate on raising his granddaughter. He is initially unable to come to terms with the carefree conduct of the Boston office and once considers moving back to New York. However, he finds his footing in the Boston office, becoming a mentor to the associates, particularly Katie Lloyd, Clarence Bell and Jerry Espenson. He also falls in with the sometimes surreal legal activities of the Litigation Division, notably by filing a lawsuit against the broadcast television networks in which the plaintiffs demanded that they air programs for people with working brains. Carl is an old flame of Shirley's and proposes to her in "Thanksgiving." Shirley and Carl are married in a civil ceremony by Supreme Court Justice Antonin Scalia at Nimmo Bay in the series finale.

=== Jerry Espenson ===
Jerry Espenson
- Boston Legal character
- First appearance: "Legal Deficits"
- Last appearance: "Last Call"
- Portrayed by: Christian Clemenson

In-universe information
- Seasons: 2, 3, 4, 5

An attorney diagnosed with Asperger's syndrome, whose quirks include purring whenever he feels anxious and upset; constantly exclaiming "Bingo!" as an affirmative; hopping when excited; and awkwardly walking with his hands pressed to his thighs (which earned him the moniker "Hands Espenson" among the other CP&S attorneys). Since his diagnosis, Jerry has received mental and behavior modification therapy which has increased his confidence in dealing with people. Before his disorder was diagnosed, he was arrested for holding a knife to Shirley's throat after being denied partnership in the firm for the third time. Shirley dropped the charges against him after Alan promised to get Jerry the therapy he needed. After therapy, he founded his own successful law firm and opposed Alan Shore in several cases, defeating him in court despite Alan's employment of various tricks intended to rattle him. Jerry was able to use his firm and its client list as leverage to rejoin CP&S, moving from the Corporate Law department to Litigation, where he was surprisingly successful, to the delight of Alan and Shirley. Alan has even admitted that he considers Jerry to be one of the finest attorneys he has ever known. He made partner in the final season, following a declaration of support from Denny Crane and an eloquent speech of his own to the partners. Carl Sack, who had initially been dubious about him, was proud to extend the offer of partnership in the firm to Jerry. Jerry attended Harvard University, where he obtained J.D. and MBA degrees.

=== Lorraine Weller ===
Lorraine Weller
- Boston Legal character
- First appearance: "Beauty and the Beast"
- Last appearance: "Patriot Acts"
- Portrayed by: Saffron Burrows

In-universe information
- Seasons: 4

An Englishwoman by birth, Lorraine came to America as a result of an agreement with the British government. She had been a high class madam in London, with a string of escorts who serviced very senior members of the British government (and, it was rumored, the Royal Family). Her current citizenship is unclear, though it may be presumed she is a naturalized American. She graduated from Harvard Law School and was admitted to the Massachusetts bar. Joining Crane Poole & Schmidt as a litigator, her background is discovered by Whitney Rome and Katie Lloyd—who also discover, following Jerry's losing his virginity to an escort who had fallen for him, that Lorraine is still a practitioner of "the oldest profession," running strings of high-priced escorts in Boston, New York, and Washington, DC. Shortly after this information became known at the firm, Lorraine left Crane, Poole & Schmidt. Whether she resigned or was fired is unclear.

=== Whitney Rome ===
Whitney Rome
- Boston Legal character
- First appearance: "Do Tell"
- Last appearance: "Patriot Acts"
- Portrayed by: Taraji P. Henson

In-universe information
- Seasons: 4

A strong-willed associate who transferred to Crane, Poole & Schmidt's New York offices after a break-up. In her arrival at the firm, Whitney is immediately thrown into a case involving a bullfighting child whose mother wants sole custody.

=== Katie Lloyd ===
Katie Lloyd
- Boston Legal character
- First appearance: "Beauty and the Beast"
- Last appearance: "Last Call"
- Portrayed by: Tara Summers

In-universe information
- Seasons: 4, 5

A young associate from England and a recent Harvard Law graduate, she is taken under the wing of Shirley Schmidt and assigned to share an office with Jerry Espenson, with whom she tries cases frequently and develops a platonic friendship and later romantic relationship.

== Notable recurring cast and characters ==
- Judge Clark Brown (played by Henry Gibson, 24 episodes): A Boston judge the Crane, Poole & Schmidt lawyers appear before often and even take on as a client in one episode. A 70-year-old who still lives with his mother, Judge Brown likes to humiliate criminals he convicts in addition to normal punishment. Although Judge Brown claims to be a "conscientious fact finder", both Alan and Denny are able to appeal to his insecurities to gain favorable rulings. Initially thought to be a virgin, Brown admitted to having relationships with men in the Season 3 episode "Selling Sickness." He also often utters strong adjectives like "Shocking!" or "Disgusting!" during witness testimony, and often describes things as "Outrageous!" Despite his eccentricities, Brown often delivers thoughtful and eloquent verbal opinions on his cases and is willing to entertain unconventional but moral lawsuits.
- Bethany Horowitz (played by Meredith Eaton-Gilden, 18 episodes): A feisty dwarf attorney nicknamed "The Badger", and an on-again-off-again romantic interest of Denny. Bethany is also the daughter of an old girlfriend of Denny's. At one point it was suspected Bethany was actually Denny's daughter, which theory was disproved by DNA tests. Bethany ultimately was unable to reconcile the fact her mother had had a relationship with Denny, plus the fact that she was a practicing Jew while Denny was (nominally) Christian, and the two parted apparently for good, before reuniting again.

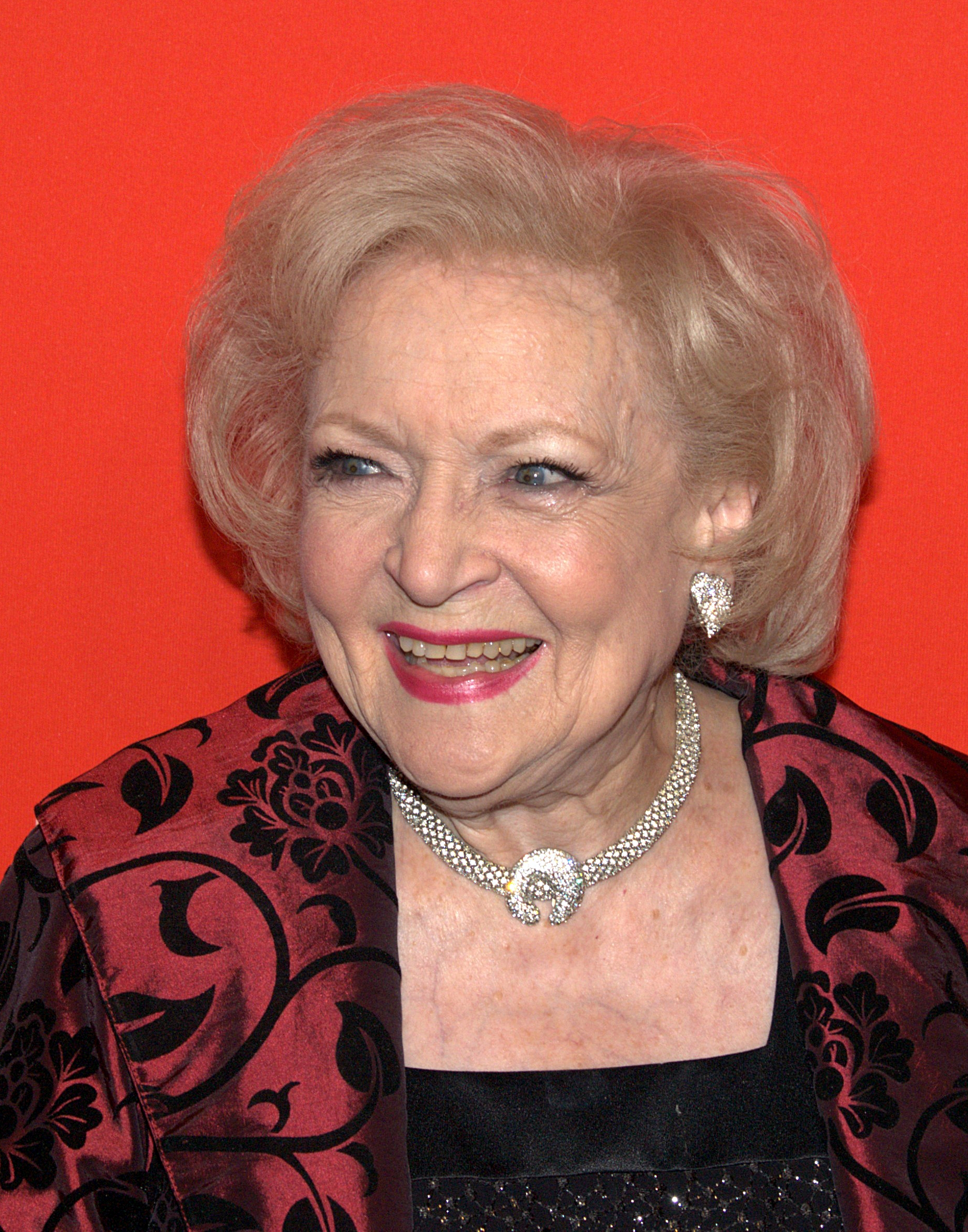
Betty White played Catherine Piper on both Boston Legal and The Practice.

- Catherine Piper (played by Betty White, 16 episodes): Alan's former assistant, first introduced in The Practice. A church-going woman who enjoyed being privy to the goings-on at Crane, Poole & Schmidt, Catherine took to the matricidal Bernard Ferrion in an attempt to introduce him to God. Convinced Ferrion would kill again, she later murdered him. With Alan's representation, Catherine was acquitted of the crime but was subsequently fired by Shirley. However, Catherine returned and was hired as a food delivery person at Crane, Poole & Schmidt and even after retiring from that job continued to be a frequent client of the firm for numerous reasons.
- Gracie Jane (played by Jill Brennan, 13 episodes): A thinly veiled parody of Nancy Grace. Jane frequently uses her television program to comment on high-profile cases the firm is trying and has a relationship with Denny, first meeting him while filling in as a guest-host on Larry King Live.
- Melissa Hughes (played by Marisa Coughlan, 12 episodes): Alan's former assistant. Alan hires her to replace Catherine Piper, and enlists her to help him combat his night terrors. He helps her discharge her credit card debt and avoid jail time for tax evasion and falls briefly for her, only to later reject her advances.
- Judge Robert Sanders (played by Shelley Berman, 11 episodes): A crotchety old judge, who seems to be senile and utters comic-sounding phrases such as "jibber-jabber" and "poopycock." He also, in a jab by the writers at then-President George W. Bush, frequently claims to be "the decider." Judge Sanders often appears oblivious to the rules of evidence, blatantly sustaining and overruling objections incorrectly, and can be manipulated by attorneys, particularly Alan Shore. He also married Brad Chase and Denise Bauer in the labor room of a hospital moments before the baby was born after Denise went into labor at her wedding, because Brad insisted no child of his would come into the world a bastard.

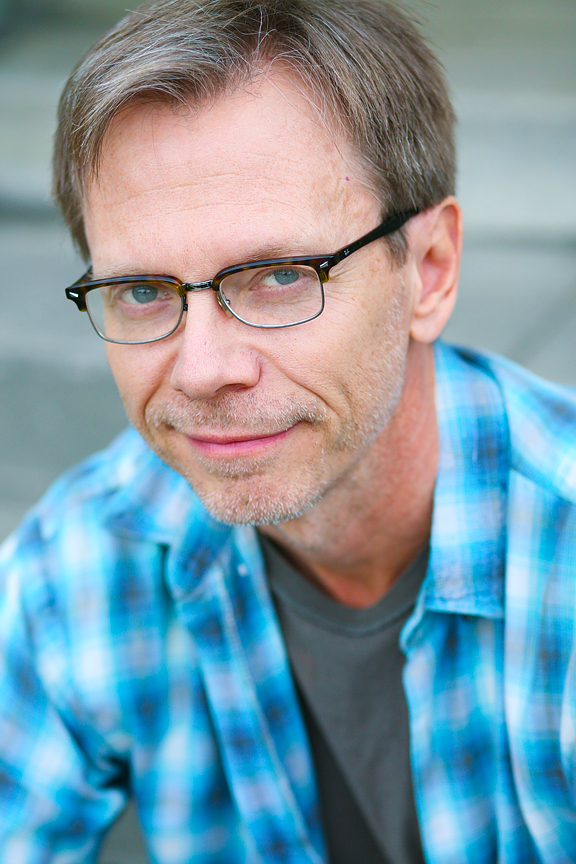
David Dean Bottrell recurred as antagonist Lincoln Meyer.

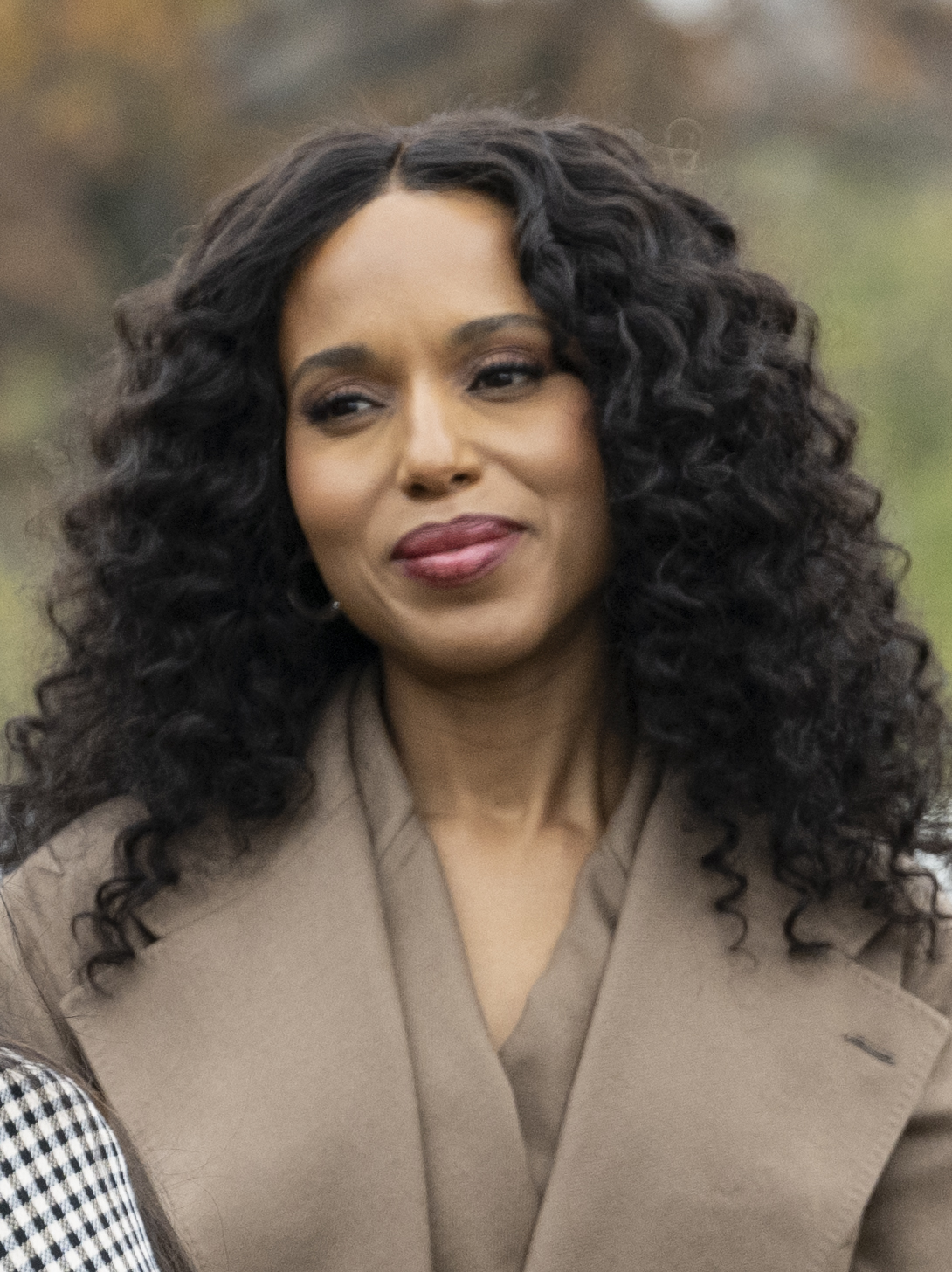
Golden Globe nominee Kerry Washington played Chelina Hall.

- ADA Frank Ginsberg (played by Currie Graham, 9 episodes): An assistant district attorney with political ambitions. He wants to get elected district attorney, and has tried to further this goal by promoting himself to the public with cases of questionable merit. Some instances of his misguided intentions include prosecuting a sexual surrogate and her patient (Jerry) for prostitution, trying to imprison a homeless man who cannibalized a dead body when death by starvation became imminent, and attempting to put Denny behind bars for illegally exporting medical waste. On each occasion, Ginsberg's plans to use his cases as sensational self-promotion were ruined (typically by Alan Shore) when his targets were acquitted.
- Lincoln Meyer (played by David Dean Bottrell, 8 episodes): A campy eccentric, Meyer was a witness in the murder trial of his neighbor, a female judge on whom he had an unrequited crush. Meyer is a lonely peeping Tom, and is revealed to have developed psychosis, which causes him to sue anyone who calls out his eccentricity, and later cause physical harm to the point of murdering the judge who denied his motion, trying to murder a TV show hostess, and even kidnapping Shirley following her refusal to go out on a date. Meyer's house is eventually raided by the police following a hunch from the Crane, Poole & Schmidt partners and associates, and he is shot in the chest by his own crossbow, which he set up as a booby trap to prevent Shirley's rescue.
- Judge Harvey Cooper (played by Anthony Heald, 8 episodes): First introduced in The Practice, Judge Cooper becomes a nemesis of Alan Shore, Denny Crane and Jeffrey Coho. A transplant from Los Angeles to Boston, he frequently puts unnecessary emphasis on the syllables in Massachusetts. After presiding over several high-profile trials involving Crane, Poole & Schmidt, he appeals for their help in representing him in the Season 4 finale.
- Judge Gloria Weldon (played by Gail O'Grady, 7 episodes): A beautiful judge that Alan rekindles a relationship with during Seasons 3 and 4. They eventually split over her desire to have children and Alan's reluctance.
- Daniel Post (played by Michael J. Fox, 6 episodes): Denise's love interest with terminal lung cancer. Daniel is a hugely wealthy businessman who initially goes to Denise for help winning a case against a man who is suing him for using his influence to get a test drug that might save his life. Their relationship develops until he restarts his radiation therapy and then goes off to Europe, presumably to die. Daniel returns in the season finale, alive, and proposes to Denise. In the third season, he dies during a lung transplant, however, and his remains are lost on the black market. Denise was able to recover his head in a haunted house Halloween attraction in Salem, Massachusetts.
- Bernard Ferrion (played by Leslie Jordan, 6 episodes): A short statured man, who whacked his mother over the head with a frying pan and proceeded to hire Alan as his lawyer. Bernard's mother dies shortly thereafter, but manages to tell about Bernard's act; however, Alan manages to acquit Bernard due to lack of evidence. Bernard's neighbor witnesses the killing, and for fear of incrimination, Bernard murders her in the same manner. He seeks Alan's help once more, but Alan deems him evil and turns him over to Tara, who also acquits him due to lack of evidence. Bernard keeps returning to Crane, Poole & Schmidt in unsuccessful attempts to regain his friendship with Alan, and befriends Catherine, who tries to "save his soul" by introducing him to religion. However, as Bernard keeps displaying signs of willingness to kill again just for the thrill and attention, Catherine starts to fear for her own life, and so kills Bernard in the same manner he killed his mother and neighbor, and hides his body in a freezer.
- Melvin Palmer (played by Christopher Rich, 6 episodes): A Texan lawyer and Alan's nemesis. He is extremely (but falsely) friendly and charming, and uses this as a strategy in nearly all his cases. Only once does he drop his facade, revealing him to be a cold, amoral and manipulative lawyer. Alan immediately despises him, and he occupies the role of an antagonist until near the end of the show, where he defends Denny and Alan from adultery charges. This leads to Melvin and Denny becoming good friends, which irritates Alan further.
- Chelina Hall (played by Kerry Washington, 5 episodes): Prior to coming to work for Crane, Poole & Schmidt in Boston, Chelina worked on behalf of death row inmates for the Texas Innocence Project by petitioning the Texas High Court to reconsider execution sentence. She lost her temper during her final appearance before the court, calling the chief judge "a disgusting, fat pig." Later, when one of her previous cases comes up for appeal, Chelina fears this incident may have prejudiced the judge against her and convinces Alan to argue the case in her stead. She was originally intended to appear in several episodes near the end of the first season, but when these episodes were retooled to appear at the beginning of the second season, her burgeoning romance with Alan was apparently cut short. Alan re-encounters Chelina in the second-season episode "Race Ipsa" (actually a holdover from season one) and in a comment that broke the fourth wall, Alan says that she has left the show "to be in movies" (which she did in real life), also making reference to the change in the show's airing time.
- Beverly Bridge (played by Joanna Cassidy, 5 episodes): A woman that Denny meets, courts and marries in short order during Season 2. Other members of the firm are concerned she is a gold-digger only after Denny's money and that she will force him to retire and cash out his stake in the firm. The two divorce after Denny commits adultery at their wedding reception.

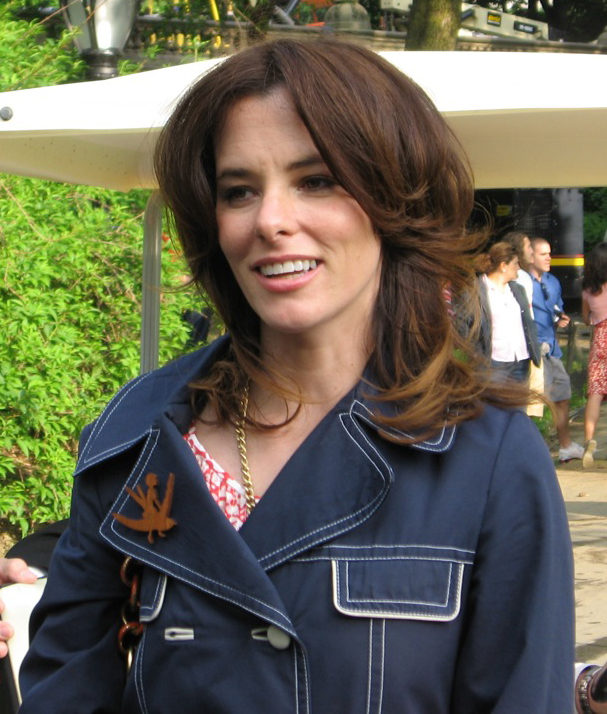
Parker Posey recurred as Marlene Stanger, an attorney at the firm and Alan's love interest

- Bella Horowitz (played by Delta Burke, 5 episodes): Mother of Bethany, Bella attempts to rekindle her relationship with Denny while her daughter is dating him. She also claims Denny is Bethany's father, only to see this claim dis-proven.
- Barbara Little (played by Katey Sagal, 5 episodes): The mother of Scott Little and a key player in the high-profile murder case the firm tries throughout the beginning of Season 3. She is secretly carrying on an incestuous relationship with Scott and commits perjury to prevent him from being convicted.
- ADA Christopher Palmer (played by William Russ, 5 episodes): A frequent nemesis of the firm, Palmer usually appears in cases as an advocate for gun control.
- Edwin Poole (played by Larry Miller, 4 episodes): Named Partner at Crane, Poole & Schmidt. Edwin arrived at a staff meeting pantless and was sent to a psychiatric hospital in the first few minutes of the pilot. He later escaped, much to Denny's concern, and he successfully participated in one case before deciding to go back. He returned again for one episode in Season 2 after being released, focusing his efforts on finding someone to sue. Edwin returned to the hospital on Shirley's advice. He reappeared in the final season, released from the hospital and retired, as the foster parent of a black boy and was present at the Thanksgiving Day dinner where Carl Sack asked Shirley to marry him and the possibility of the firm going under was discussed.
- Marlene Stanger (played by Parker Posey, 4 episodes): A stone-cold, ruthless attorney. Known at her old firm as "The Squid" (apparently the only animal that can kill a shark, a term commonly used to describe someone with aggressive ambition in the legal or corporate world), Marlene is not above using underhanded tactics to win cases, and specializes in undermining her associates. She finds herself very unnerved by Alan, and eventually had sex with him in his office. Her hostile relationship with Denise led to the ruining of Denise's chance to make partner. At the end of Season 2, in accordance with the contract by which she joined Crane, Poole & Schmidt Marlene was made a partner; but in the third-season premiere, she transferred from Boston to the New York office.

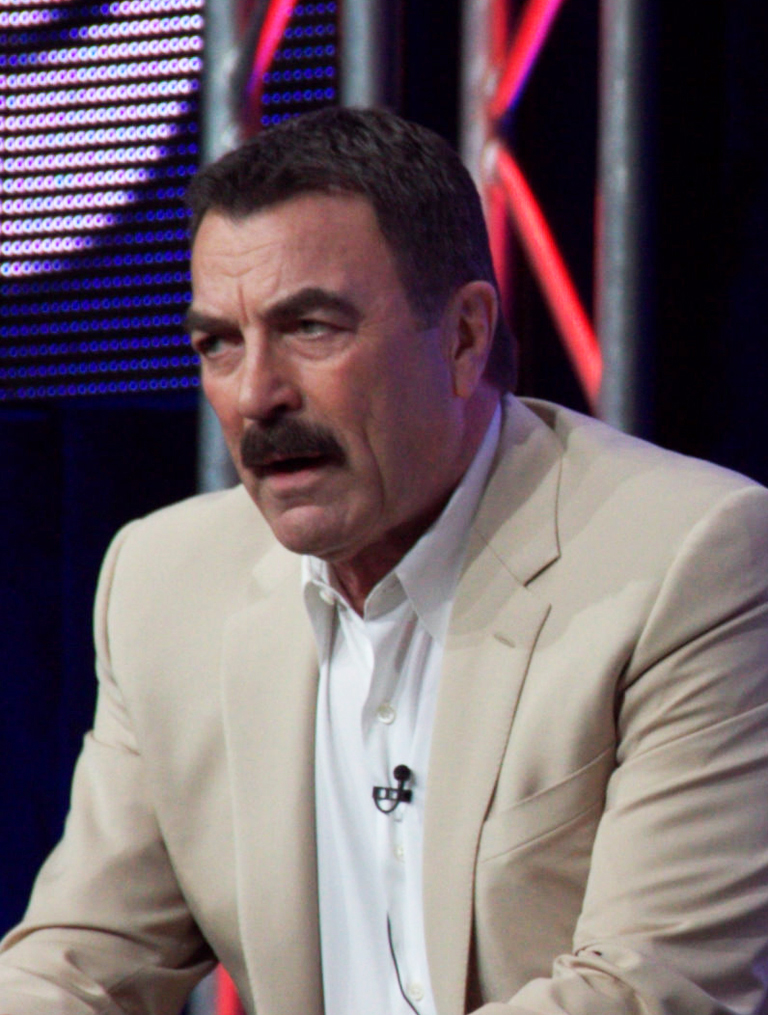
Tom Selleck recurred as Ivan Tiggs, Shirley Schmidt's ex-husband.

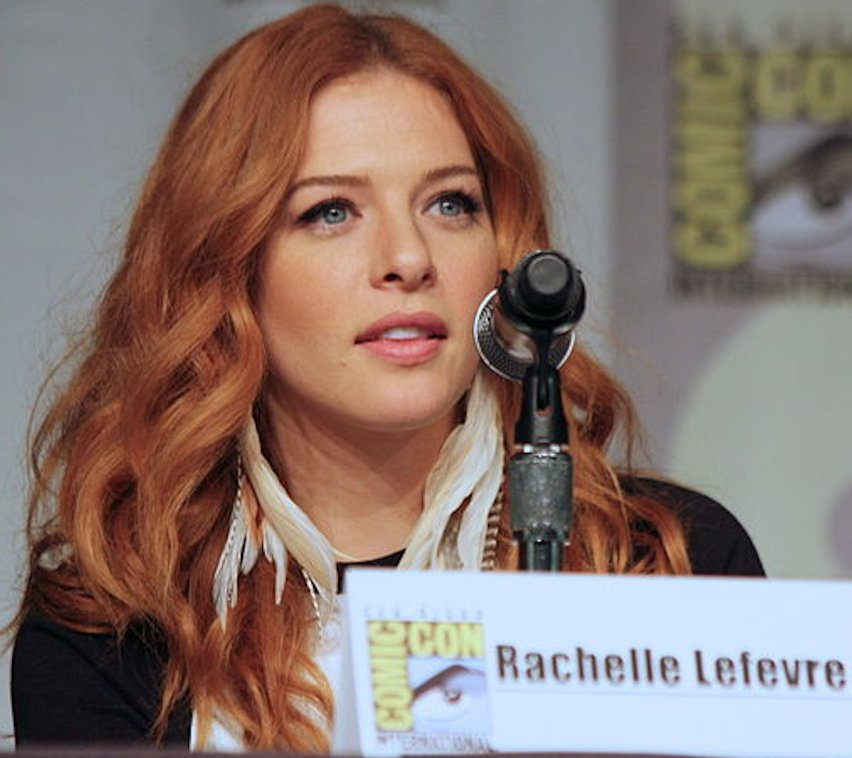
Rachelle Lefevre recurred as Dana Strickland, Jerry Espenson's call girl girlfriend.

- Ivan Tiggs (played by Tom Selleck, 4 episodes): Shirley Schmidt's ex-husband and a womanizer. After announcing his engagement to his sixth wife Missy, he attempted to rekindle his former relationship with Shirley, saying he would dump Missy if Shirley would take him back. When Shirley refused, he married Missy and later lied about leaving her to reunite with Shirley. The ploy worked, and he and Shirley were briefly reunited. When Shirley learned of his deception, she drafted a "post-nuptial agreement" that would relinquish virtually all of Ivan's possessions to Missy if he were ever caught cheating on her. He attempted to legally void the agreement (with Alan as his representation), but eventually handed everything over to Missy if Shirley would give him another chance. Shirley refused, saying "I can't love you anymore," and Ivan was last seen alone and penniless.
- Missy Tiggs (played by Meredith Patterson, 4 episodes): The eccentric, obnoxious, Broadway musical-loving, singing, snort-laughing, and very young sixth ex-wife of Ivan Tiggs. Despite the fact she is marrying her ex-husband, Shirley befriends her and even serves as the maid of honor at Ivan and Missy's wedding. After divorcing Ivan, she is last seen when brought into court by a black man with whom she had protected sex, after Missy took his sperm from a condom and used it to impregnate herself with an "Obama baby." The black man brought suit against her, which case was resolved to the satisfaction of no one. It is unknown if Missy gave birth or not as she disappeared after that episode.
- Rachel Lewiston (played by Jayne Brook, 4 episodes): Paul Lewiston's estranged daughter who is addicted to crystal meth. The two reconnect and Paul discovers he has a granddaughter, Fiona. He enlists Brad Chase to force Rachel to go to rehab and takes custody of Fiona, only to have Brad fall for Rachel.
- ADA Holly Raines (played by Ana Ortiz, 4 episodes): An assistant district attorney with whom Alan and Brad clash during Season 2. She attempts to obtain employment at the firm with the help of Alan, only to be disrespected by Brad and later faces him in court.
- Joanna Monroe (played by Jane Lynch, 4 episodes): A sexual surrogate who retains Alan's services as a lawyer multiple times, as Alan is a former client of hers. She also provides sexual surrogacy for Jerry Espenson to combat his intimacy issues.
- Leigh Swift (played by Mary Gross, 4 episodes): A woman with Paraphilia and Asperger's syndrome who becomes a client of and girlfriend to Jerry Espenson. The two break up because of her intense, violent jealousy of Katie Lloyd.
- Emma Path (played by Pamela Adlon, 4 episodes): A lawyer that frequently appears against Alan Shore and who is the target of his sexual harassment.
- Nora Jacobs (played by Jodi Lyn O'Keefe, 3 episodes): assistant to Alan Shore (he flirts with her which causes her to feel uncomfortable and harassed)
- Donny Crane (played by Freddie Prinze, Jr., 3 episodes): A young lawyer who was believed to be Denny's illegitimate son, the product of an affair with an anonymous woman. Denny, however, did not see him for fifteen years. Denny later confessed to Alan that when Donny's mother slapped him with a paternity suit, he settled, and Donny's mother later admitted that he wasn't the father. Many jokes were made about the closeness of Donny and Denny's names. When Donny found out that Denny was not his biological father, he was crushed, and his relationship with Denny became very strained; however, Denny still considers him his son and has referred to him as such on occasion. Just like Denny, Donny uses his own name as an exclamation at inappropriate times.
- Judge Robert Thompson (played by Howard Hesseman, 3 episodes): A laid-back and unorthodox judge whose trademark is that he almost never actually sits on the bench when hearing a case, preferring to lean against the witness stand or the jury box during testimony (a fact which greatly unnerves Jerry Espenson).
- Professor Clifford Cabot (played by Ed Begley Jr., 3 episodes): A sexology professor who is a longtime and frequent client of the firm.
- Dana Strickland (played by Rachelle Lefevre, 3 episodes): A high-priced escort prostitute who works for Lorraine Weller who became Jerry Espenson's "girlfriend." She sued Jerry for sexual assault. Later on, she gets arrested for prostitution and asks for Jerry's help, but is faced with a difficult choice of walking free by revealing who her boss, Lorraine, is. She decides she will not take the deal and flip on Lorraine. She never arrives to court, missing her hearing and when asked by Katie and Jerry if she knows where she is, Lorraine shrugs off the question and denies knowing anything. She is never heard from again, nor mentioned.
- Doris Thumper (played by Yvette Nicole Brown, 2 episodes): A friend of Clarence Bell who is a shy and recovered borderline agoraphobic but is a talented singer. She is introduced in the Season 4 episode "Green Christmas." Clarence informs her that he must drop out of the singing competition if he wants to keep his job at the Law Firm once a video of them performing goes viral but later on is able to keep his job and continue to sing in the competition. By the end of the episode Doris and Clarence advance to the semifinals after singing "Big Blonde and Beautiful" from the musical Hairspray.

== See also ==
- Boston Legal
- List of Boston Legal episodes
