= Ryan Michelle Bathe =

American actress

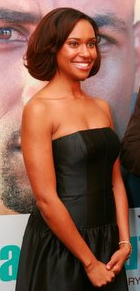
- Education: Stanford University (BA); New York University (MFA)
- Occupation: Actress
- Years active: 2001–present
- Spouse: Sterling K. Brown (m. 2006)
- Children: 2

Ryan Michelle Bathé is an American actress known for Boston Legal (2005–06), First Wives Club (2019–22), and The Endgame (2022).

== Early life and education ==
Bathe's mother is Clare Bathé, an actress and singer who was a member of the late 1970s funk/disco/rock group Machine. She grew up in Stamford, Connecticut. She graduated from Stanford University, and she earned a Master of Fine Arts degree from New York University.

== Career ==
Bathe has had guest starring roles in a number of television shows, including ER, Half & Half, Girlfriends, Brothers & Sisters, and How I Met Your Mother. She was regular cast member during the second season of the ABC legal drama series Boston Legal playing attorney Sara Holt. From 2009 to 2010, she had a recurring role on the short-lived NBC medical drama Trauma, and in 2011 had starring role in the TV Land sitcom Retired at 35. She had main roles in the independent films All About Us and April Moon.

In 2012, Bathe co-starred opposite Katherine Heigl in the crime comedy film One for the Money. Later that year, she had a recurring role opposite her real life husband Sterling K. Brown in the Lifetime drama series Army Wives. In 2014, she was a female lead opposite Kevin Hart in the ABC comedy pilot Keep It Together. In 2016, Bathe was cast in a recurring role in the NBC drama series, This Is Us, also starring Brown.

In 2018, Bathe was cast as one of leads in the BET+ comedy-drama series First Wives Club based on the film of the same name written by Robert Harling. She left the series after two seasons in 2022. In 2020, she signed a first look deal with ViacomCBS. Bathe appeared in the 2020 romantic comedy film Sylvie's Love and the following year guest-starred on HBO series, A Black Lady Sketch Show. In 2022, Bathe was cast as a lead alongside Morena Baccarin in the NBC heist thriller series The Endgame. In 2023, she played the leading role in the thriller film Boy in the Walls directed by Constance Zimmer, and was cast alongside Terry Crews in the CBS comedy pilot JumpStart.

== Personal life ==
In March 2006, Bathe married fellow actor and Stanford alum Sterling K. Brown. They have two sons.

== Filmography ==
=== Film ===
Year	Title	Role	Notes
2003	Good Fences	Stormy (age 17)	
2004	Brother to Brother	Classroom Girl #2	
2005	Lackawanna Blues	Nancy's Birthday Party Guest	Television film
2007	All About Us	Stacey Brown	
2007	April Moon	Michelle	
2008	Leaving Barstow	Jenny	
2012	One for the Money	Jackie	
2020	Sylvie's Love	Kate Spencer	
2023	Boy in the Walls	Alisa Jensen	

=== Television ===
Year	Title	Role	Notes
2001	The Education of Max Bickford	Sarai	Episode: "Who Is Breckenridge Long?"
2003	ER	Miss Evelyn	Episode: "Dear Abby"
2004	Half & Half	Aurora	Episode: "The Big I Haven't the Vegas Idea Episode"
2004	Girlfriends	Becky	Episodes: "L.A. Bound"
2005–2006	Boston Legal	Sara Holt	Main cast: season 2
2006	Pink Collar	Alix	Episode: "Pilot"
2007	Brothers & Sisters	Noreen	Episodes: "Sexual Politics" & "Love Is Difficult"
2007	Medium	Claire Williams	Episode: "We Had a Dream"
2007	Girlfriends	Traci Blackwell	Episodes: "Church Lady" & "A House Divided"
2008	How I Met Your Mother	Michelle	Episode: "Sandcastles in the Sand"
2009	Bones	Erin Miller	Episode: "The Double Death of the Dearly Departed"
2009	It's Always Sunny in Philadelphia	Woman Office Worker	Episode: "A Very Sunny Christmas"
2009	Brothers	Kathleen	Episode: "Snoop Returns"
2010	Private Practice	Robin	Episode: "Pulling the Plug"
2009–2010	Trauma	Sela Boone	Recurring cast
2011	Retired at 35	Jessica Sanders	Main cast: season 1
2011	Harry's Law	Mrs. Thomas	Episode: "American Girl"
2012	Army Wives	Charlie	Recurring cast: season 6
2014	Franklin & Bash	Denise Parker	Episode: "Spirits in the Material World"
2014	Keep It Together		TV pilot
2015	Romantically Speaking	Krista	TV pilot
2016	Guidance	Dr. Rhonda Bartlett	Episodes: "Rumor or Trumor?" & "Bam Bam"
2016	Dr. Ken	Miss Flanagan	Episode: "Ken's Apology"
2016–2018	This Is Us	Yvette	Recurring cast: Season 1, guest: Season 3
2017	Linda from HR	Sierra	TV pilot
2018	Empire	Celeste	Recurring cast: Season 4
2018	Every Other Weekend	Ryan	Main cast
2018	The Rookie	Det. Paige	Episodes: "Crash Course" & "The Hawke"
2018	Steps	Genevieve	TV pilot
2019	Timeline	Mrs. Sklar	Main cast
2019–2021	First Wives Club	Ariel "Ari" Montgomery	Series regular, 17 episodes
2020–2023	All Rise	Rachel Audubon	Recurring cast, 19 episodes
2021	A Black Lady Sketch Show	Amara	Episodes: "So You Just Out Here Chloroforming Anybody?"
2022	The Endgame	Val Turner	Series regular, 10 episodes
2023	JumpStart	Marcy	TV pilot
2026	Paradise	Stacy	Episode: “Jane”
