= Pink Collar =

2006 ABC sitcom

- Written by: Patricia Breen
- Directed by: Alan Poul
- Starring: Alicia Silverstone; Hedy Burress; Ryan Michelle Bathe; Kristin Bauer; Matt Malloy; Reggie Austin
- Country of origin: United States
- Original language: English
- No. of episodes: 1

Production
- Producers: Patricia Breen; Alexa Junge; David Knoller

Original release
- Network: ABC

Pink Collar is a 2006 ABC sitcom that aired only the pilot episode. It stars Alicia Silverstone, Hedy Burress, Charlotte Ross, Matt Malloy, and Ryan Michelle Bathe. Set in an accident insurance agency, Pink Collar shows the lives of four women as they juggle their ambitions, friendships, and relationships in the work place.

== Plot ==
Hayden Flynn is a hard worker who hates office politics. Hayden's career has been defined by one small but lasting workplace fiasco that occurred years ago. Trying to get back into the company's good graces, Hayden must compete with her best friend Claire for a promotion. Claire is determined to make VP by the time she's 30—but when she unexpectedly finds out she's pregnant, Claire begins to wonder if a woman has to make a choice between career and motherhood. Both women are watched by Eve, who is willing to upset people, or sleep with a coworker, to establish her place in the office hierarchy. Alix is a beautiful newcomer with an MBA degree and minority status.

== Cast ==
- Alicia Silverstone as Hayden Flynn
- Hedy Burress as Claire Shoop
- Ryan Michelle Bathe as Alix
- Kristin Bauer as Eve
- Reggie Austin as Steve
- Matt Malloy as Marcel
- Steve Cell as Meeting Executive
- Michael Miranda as Doug Woo
- Linda Phillips-Palo as Plant Lady
- Michael Silva as Lawson (voice)
