= Boston Legal =

American television series

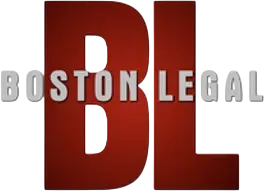
- Genre: Legal drama Comedy drama
- Created by: David E. Kelley
- Starring: James Spader; Monica Potter; Rhona Mitra; Lake Bell; Mark Valley; William Shatner; Candice Bergen; René Auberjonois; Julie Bowen; Justin Mentell; Ryan Michelle Bathe; Craig Bierko; Constance Zimmer; Gary Anthony Williams; John Larroquette; Christian Clemenson; Tara Summers; Saffron Burrows; Taraji P. Henson
- Composer: Danny Lux
- Country of origin: United States
- Original language: English
- No. of seasons: 5
- No. of episodes: 101 (list of episodes)

Production
- Executive producers: David E. Kelley; Bill D'Elia; Mike Listo; Lawrence Broch; Janet Leahy (2.04–3.24); Scott Kaufer (1.01–2.03, 2.23); Jeff Rake (1.01–1.13)
- Running time: 42–62 minutes
- Production companies: David E. Kelley Productions; 20th Century Fox Television

Original release
- Network: ABC
- Release: October 3, 2004 – December 8, 2008

Related
- The Practice; Boston Public

Boston Legal is an American legal comedy drama television series created by former lawyer and Boston native David E. Kelley, produced in association with 20th Century Fox Television for ABC. The series aired from October 3, 2004, to December 8, 2008. The series stars James Spader, William Shatner and Candice Bergen. It is a direct spin-off and continuation of the TV series The Practice, with several characters from the eighth season of that series moving to Boston Legal. While never a Nielsen-ratings hit, the show was critically acclaimed. It received 26 Primetime Emmy Awards nominations, including for Outstanding Drama Series in 2007 and 2008 and a Peabody Award in 2005.

== Plot ==
Boston Legal follows the exploits of former Practice character Alan Shore, and his passionate co-workers, at the fictional law offices of Crane, Poole & Schmidt. The high-end litigation Boston firm handles both civil and criminal law cases.

The series plays on the chemistry between Alan Shore and loose cannon Denny Crane. Middle-aged Shore is wry and wily, while mid-70s Crane (suffering from the early stages of Alzheimer's disease) is flamboyant and eccentric. Shore often uses questionable methods to win cases. Crane is obsessed with the reputation of his name, which he frequently repeats. Though political opposites, Shore and Crane are best friends. Episodes more often than not end with the two relaxing and musing together on the firm's balcony while smoking cigars and drinking scotch whisky.

== Cast ==
=== The Practice characters ===
- James Spader as Alan Shore (The Practice season 8; seasons 1–5)
- Rhona Mitra as Tara Wilson (The Practice season 8; season 1; recurring season 2)
- Lake Bell as Sally Heep (The Practice season 8; season 1; guest season 3)
- William Shatner as Denny Crane (The Practice season 8; seasons 1–5)

=== Main characters ===
- Monica Potter as Lori Colson (season 1; recurring season 2)
- Mark Valley as Brad Chase (seasons 1–3; recurring season 4)
- Candice Bergen as Shirley Schmidt (season 1, episode 11–season 5)
- René Auberjonois as Paul Lewiston (seasons 1–3; recurring season 4–5)
- Julie Bowen as Denise Bauer (seasons 2–3; guest season 5)
- Justin Mentell as Garrett Wells (season 2)
- Ryan Michelle Bathe as Sara Holt (season 2)
- Craig Bierko as Jeffrey Coho (season 3)
- Constance Zimmer as Claire Simms (season 3)
- Gary Anthony Williams as Clarence Bell (seasons 3–4)
- John Larroquette as Carl Sack (seasons 4–5)
- Christian Clemenson as Jerry Espenson (seasons 4–5; recurring season 2–3)
- Tara Summers as Katie Lloyd (seasons 4–5)
- Saffron Burrows as Lorraine Weller (season 4)
- Taraji P. Henson as Whitney Rome (season 4)

== Production ==
Prior to the show's premiere, it had a working title of Fleet Street, an allusion to the real street in Boston where the fictitious Crane, Poole & Schmidt had its offices. The working title was later modified to The Practice: Fleet Street, but this title was dropped in favor of Boston Legal. The real building shown as the law office is located at 500 Boylston Street, 1.4 miles away from Fleet Street.

The American producers of the series also hired the British writer and barrister John Mortimer (creator of the British legal series Rumpole of the Bailey) as a consultant for Boston Legal.

The show's pilot was originally produced with former The Practice stars James Spader and Rhona Mitra, guest stars William Shatner and Lake Bell. It featured an expanded storyline with Larry Miller as Edwin Poole, Mark Valley as Brad Chase and John Michael Higgins as senior partner Jerry Austin. Monica Potter was later cast as junior partner Lori Colson and René Auberjonois as senior partner Paul Lewiston, replacing John Michael Higgins. The pilot premiered on ABC on October 3, 2004.

On November 30, 2004, it was announced that Candice Bergen would join the cast as senior partner Shirley Schmidt, a character the producers had planned to introduce for several months. Lake Bell left the series mid-season, and René Auberjonois was promoted to main cast member. Anthony Heald and Betty White also made regular guest appearances, having both appeared as the same characters on The Practice.

On April 5, 2005, the series was renewed for a second season, although ABC put the show on hiatus in favor of Grey's Anatomy. The success of Grey's Anatomy placed Boston Legal on hold until autumn 2005, when it returned for an extended season of 27 episodes. Both Rhona Mitra and Monica Potter left the series during the hiatus, while Julie Bowen was cast as Denise Bauer. Ryan Michelle Bathe and Justin Mentell were later cast as junior associates Sara Holt and Garrett Wells. The second episode of season 3 introduced Craig Bierko as Jeffrey Coho and Constance Zimmer as Claire Simms. In episode 11, guest star Gary Anthony Williams joined the cast, with Craig Bierko leaving in episode 15.

On June 4, 2007, TV Guide announced that René Auberjonois, Julie Bowen, Mark Valley and Constance Zimmer would not return for season 4. On June 13, 2007, it was announced that actor John Larroquette (former The Practice guest star) would join the cast as a senior partner transferred from the New York offices of Crane, Poole & Schmidt, with actress Tara Summers joining as a young associate. Christian Clemenson (former The Practice guest star), who had guest-starred occasionally as Jerry Espenson (a brilliant but socially inept lawyer with Asperger syndrome), was promoted to main cast. Production also stated that René Auberjonois, Mark Valley, Julie Bowen, and Constance Zimmer may return in guest roles. On July 2, 2007, it was reported that both René Auberjonois and Mark Valley would return in recurring roles; It was also announced that Taraji P. Henson would join the cast in season 4, with Saffron Burrows appearing in a recurring role. Burrows later became a full-time cast member.

On May 13, 2008, ABC announced that Boston Legal would return for a fifth and final season in the fall. Saffron Burrows did not return as a series regular, having joined the cast of My Own Worst Enemy. The final season consisted of 13 episodes to reach the "100" episode mark, which facilitated successful syndication. There was speculation that Boston Legal might receive an additional episode order, if the show had another strong showing in the Emmy Awards and produced solid ratings in its new fall time slot. The season began airing on September 22, 2008.

On June 18 and June 20, 2008, it was reported that Gary Anthony Williams and Taraji P. Henson would not return for season 5 as Clarence Bell and Whitney Rome, respectively. On July 17, 2008, Boston Legal was nominated for a series-high seven Emmy nominations, including for Best Drama Series for the second consecutive year. Spader, Bergen and Shatner were each nominated for their respective roles.

Boston Legal's two-hour-long series finale aired on Monday, December 8, 2008, at 9:00PM Eastern/8:00PM Central. On December 7, 2008, David E. Kelley stated in an interview with the Pittsburgh Post-Gazette that it was ABC's decision to end Boston Legal, and that he "had to fight to bring it back for a short season of 13 episodes".

The show was noted for frequently breaking the fourth wall throughout its run.

== Episodes ==
Season	Episodes	Originally released	
Season	Episodes	First released	Last released
1	17	October 3, 2004	March 20, 2005
2	27	September 27, 2005	May 16, 2006
3	24	September 19, 2006	May 29, 2007
4	20	September 25, 2007	May 21, 2008
5	13	September 22, 2008	December 8, 2008

== Reception ==
=== Ratings and audience profile ===
According to Nielsen Media Research, Boston Legal drew the richest viewing audience on television, based on the concentration of high-income viewers in its young adult audience (Adult 18–49 index w/$100k+ annual income).

Seasonal rankings (based on average total viewers per episode) of Boston Legal on ABC.

Note: Each U.S. network television season starts in late September and ends in late May, which coincides with the completion of May sweeps. All times mentioned in this section were in the Eastern and Pacific time zones.

Season	Timeslot	Season premiere	Season finale	TV season	Season rank	Viewers (in millions)
1	Sunday 10:00 pm	October 3, 2004	March 20, 2005	2004–2005	#28	12.53
2	Tuesday 10:00 pm	September 27, 2005	May 16, 2006	2005–2006	#47	10.30
3	Tuesday 10:00 pm	September 19, 2006	May 29, 2007	2006–2007	#62	9.57
4	Tuesday 10:00 pm Wednesday 10:00 pm	September 25, 2007	May 21, 2008	2007–2008	#51	9.62
5	Monday 10:00 pm	September 22, 2008	December 8, 2008	2008–2009	#47	9.62

=== Awards ===
Primetime Emmy Awards:

- 2005 Award for Outstanding Lead Actor in a Drama Series (James Spader)
- 2005 Award for Outstanding Supporting Actor in a Drama Series (William Shatner)
- 2006 Award for Outstanding Guest Actor in a Drama Series (Christian Clemenson)
- 2007 Award for Outstanding Lead Actor in a Drama Series (James Spader)
  - James Spader also won the 2004 Award for Outstanding Lead Actor in a Drama Series for the same role on The Practice.
  - William Shatner also won the 2004 Outstanding Guest Actor in a Drama Series for the same role on The Practice.

Golden Globe Awards:

- 2004 Award for Best Supporting Actor in a Series, Miniseries, or TV Movie (William Shatner)

Peabody Awards

- 2005, as David E. Kelley Productions, in association with 20th Century Fox Television

== Home media ==
DVD name	Region 1	Region 2	Region 4
Season 1	May 23, 2006	July 24, 2006	August 9, 2006
Season 2	November 21, 2006	March 5, 2007	February 21, 2007
Season 3	September 18, 2007	January 14, 2008	October 10, 2007
Season 4	September 23, 2008	October 13, 2008	December 3, 2008
Season 5	May 5, 2009	May 11, 2009	August 5, 2009
The Complete Series	May 5, 2009	May 11, 2009	November 18, 2009

As a former ABC series, the show is available for streaming on Disney platform Hulu.
