= Love contract =

Type of legal contract

A love contract is a legal contract that is meant to limit the liability of an employer whose employees are romantically involved. An employer may choose to require a love contract when a romantic relationship within the company becomes known, in order to indemnify the company in case the employees' romantic relationship fails, primarily so that one party can't bring a sexual harassment lawsuit against the company. To that end, the love contract states that the relationship is consensual, and both parties of the relationship must sign it. The love contract may also stipulate rules for acceptable romantic behavior in the workplace.
