= Christian Clemenson =

American actor (born 1958)

- Born: Christian Dayton Clemenson; March 17, 1958 (age 68); Humboldt, Iowa, U.S.
- Education: Harvard University (BA); Yale University (MFA)
- Occupation: Actor
- Years active: 1985–present

Christian Dayton Clemenson (born March 17, 1958) is an American actor. He is well known for his portrayal of Jerry "Hands" Espenson in the television series Boston Legal, for which he was nominated for three Emmy Awards and won the 2006 Emmy Award for Outstanding Guest Actor in a Drama Series. He has appeared in a number of highly acclaimed films, including Hannah and Her Sisters, Broadcast News, Apollo 13 and The Big Lebowski, and portrayed Tom Burnett in Paul Greengrass' United 93. He starred in American Crime Story: The People vs. O.J. Simpson as prosecutor William Hodgman.

== Early life ==
Clemenson was born and raised in Humboldt, Iowa, the son of drug store owners Ruth Alzora (Dayton) and Ernest Arnold Clemenson. In his early teens, he delivered the Des Moines Register, which had a long tradition of awarding scholarships to top East Coast preparatory schools to a select few "paper boys." Clemenson, a straight-A junior high school student, won a Register scholarship to Phillips Academy in Andover, Massachusetts. He participated in many theatrical productions at Phillips Academy. In 1973, while Clemenson was enrolled at Phillips, his father died at age 58.

Upon graduation from Phillips in 1976, he entered Harvard College. From his freshman year onward he received important roles in campus stage productions. When Clemenson starred in a Harvard Lampoon sketch comedy show, a Harvard Crimson theater critic described Clemenson as "hugely talented actor who can trigger hysteria with any of a dozen subtle expressions or inflections." Other Crimson critics described his performances in Shakespeare plays as "a tour de force of sheer talent and intelligence" (in The Winter's Tale) and "a very fine and subtle performance" (in Measure for Measure). He displayed early on his remarkable range when he undertook with inimitable flair and hilarious effect the hugely solemn role of Erde "the green-faced torso", goddess of the Earth, in Peter Sellars's Loeb Drama Center puppet production of Wagner's Ring cycle (1979).

During many summers he would return to Humboldt to star in, and later direct, local community theater plays at Humboldt's Castle Theatre.

After graduating from Harvard College in 1980 and the Yale School of Drama in 1984, he moved to Los Angeles.

== Career ==
Clemenson began his career in a number of character roles in film and television. He was a law student in the television version of The Paper Chase, Alex Keaton's English teacher in the television show Family Ties, a security salesman on The Golden Girls, a suspect in season 10, episode 14 of NYPD Blue, a bailiff in the Ivan Reitman movie Legal Eagles, a flight surgeon in the movie Apollo 13, a cop in The Big Lebowski, a killer in The Fisher King, and Dr. Dale Lawrence in the movie And the Band Played On. He had a regular role as Socrates Poole, a lawyer in the Old West, in the Fox series The Adventures of Brisco County, Jr.

In 1999, Clemenson appeared in the Buffy the Vampire Slayer episode "Bad Girls" as a grotesquely obese demon named Balthazar. He wore a large padded suit and extensive make-up for the role, and the character's repulsive, villainous nature contradicted many of his earlier roles.

Clemenson became well known for his role as Jerry "Hands" Espenson on the television series Boston Legal. For playing Espenson, he won an Emmy Award for Best Guest Actor in a Drama Series in 2006 and was nominated for the same award in 2007. He remained with the series through to its finale in 2008.

Clemenson starred in the film United 93 as Tom Burnett, one of the victims of the 9/11 hijacking of the flight that crashed in rural Pennsylvania after a passenger revolt. He also had a recurring role on Veronica Mars as Abel Koontz. In total, Clemenson appeared in three episodes of the show: "Like a Virgin", "Mars vs. Mars", and "Rat Saw God". Clemenson also has appeared in a season 6 episode of NCIS, "Dead Reckoning". He also appeared in two season 2 episodes of The Mentalist. He also played Jimmy Masterson on the 3rd episode of Memphis Beat, "Love Me Tender".

In 2009, Clemenson joined CSI: Miami as the new medical examiner, Dr. Tom Loman. He appeared throughout the show's eighth, ninth, and tenth seasons as a recurring character. In 2013, he appeared as a guest star in Harry's Law.

In 2016, he played Deputy District Attorney William Hodgman in American Crime Story: The People vs. O.J. Simpson.

== Filmography ==
=== Film ===
Year	Title	Role
1986	Hannah and Her Sisters	Larry
1986	Legal Eagles	Clerk
1986	Heartburn	Sidney
1987	Black Widow	Artie
1987	Making Mr. Right	Bruce
1987	Surrender	Dream Lawyer
1987	Broadcast News	Bobby
1988	Daddy's Boys	Otis
1990	Bad Influence	Pismo Boll
1991	The Fisher King	Edwin
1992	Hero	Conklin
1993	Josh and S.A.M.	Policeman
1995	Apollo 13	Charles Berry
1998	The Big Lebowski	Younger Cop
1998	Almost Heroes	Father Girard
1998	Armageddon	Droning Guy
1998	Mighty Joe Young	Jack
1999	Lost & Found	Ray
2006	United 93	Thomas E. Burnett, Jr.
2010	Ashley's Ashes	Father Tim
2011	J. Edgar	Inspector Schell
2014	Not Safe for Work	Alan Z. Emmerich
2016	Live by Night	Ritz Investor
2021	No Man of God	James Dobson
2021	Malignant	Dr. Victor Fields
2024	Fly Me to the Moon	Walter

=== Television ===
Year	Title	Role	Notes
1985	Fame	Alan Stewart	Episode: "Selling Out"
1985	The Golden Girls	The Salesman	Episode: "Break In"
1985	Mary	Tim Flowers	Episode: "From Pillar to Post"
1986	The Paper Chase		Episode: "Graduation"
1986	L.A. Law	Pomerantz	Episode: "The Princess and the Wiener King"
1987	Head of the Class	Dave Nash	Episode: "Past Imperfect"
1987	Scarecrow and Mrs. King	Jack Colman	Episode: "Rumors of My Death"
1987	Cagney & Lacey	Dr. Weinberg	Episode: "Happiness Is a Warm Gun"
1987	The Slap Maxwell Story	Marty's Friend	Episode #1.1
1987	Beauty and the Beast	Jonathan Gould	Episode: "Nor Iron Bars a Cage"
1987	It's Garry Shandling's Show	The Amazing Al	2 episodes
1988	Family Ties	Mr. Flaherty	2 episodes
1988	21 Jump Street	Charles Greening	Episode: "Raising Marijuana"
1988	Disaster at Silo 7	Col. Brandon	Television film
1989	Hard Time on Planet Earth	Herb Leavitt	Episode: "Losing Control"
1989	The Robert Guillaume Show	David	Episode: "You Win Some, You Lose Some"
1989–1991	Matlock	Cyril Henning / Dr. Tim Crider	2 episodes
1990	Capital News	Todd Lunden	13 episodes
1991	Designing Women	Jack Henry	Episode: "Last Tango in Atlanta"
1992	Civil Wars	Leo Hood	Episode: "Dirty Pool"
1993	Hearts Afire	Martin Smithers	Episode: "While the Thomasons Slept in the Lincoln Bedroom"
1993	And the Band Played On	Dr. Dale Lawrence	Television film
1993–1994	The Adventures of Brisco County, Jr.	Socrates Poole	27 episodes
1995	Lois & Clark: The New Adventures of Superman	Rollie Vale	2 episodes
1995	Cybill	Ed Philo	Episode: "The Odd Couples"
1996	Murder One	Donald Losey	Episode: "Chapter Thirteen"
1997	Mad About You	Jared	2 episodes; uncredited
1998	The Practice	Barry Wall	Episode: "Duty Bound"
1998	Vengeance Unlimited	Agent Stuart Brownsteen	Episode: "Victim of Circumstance"
1999	Buffy the Vampire Slayer	Balthazar	Episode: "Bad Girls"
2001	Bette	Mr. McNally	Episode: "The Invisible Mom"
2001	Ladies Man	Dog Consultant	Episode: "A Quiet Evening at Home"
2001	The District	Cliff / Bob	Episode: "Night Shift"
2001	The West Wing	Evan Woodkirk, Smithsonian Curator	Episode: "The Women of Qumar"
2002	Ally McBeal	Mr. Hookland	Episode: "Homecoming"
2003	NYPD Blue	Timothy Bosham	Episode: "Laughlin All the Way to the Clink"
2003	The Division	Capt. Leo Spivey	2 episodes
2004	Method & Red	Donald	3 episodes
2004–2005	Veronica Mars	Abel Koontz	4 episodes
2005	CSI: Crime Scene Investigation	Charles Pellew	Episode: "Committed"
2005	Numbers	Henry Korfelt	Episode: "Assassin"
2005–2008	Boston Legal	Jerry Espenson	44 episodes
2006	Crossing Jordan	Fr. Edward Klausner	Episode: "Mysterious Ways"
2009	ER	Dr. Kurtag	Episode: "Old Times"
2009	NCIS	Perry Sterling	Episode: "Dead Reckoning"
2009	The Mentalist	Dr. Roy Carmen	2 episodes
2009	Raising the Bar	Tom	Episode: "Maybe, Baby"
2009–2012	CSI: Miami	Dr. Tom Loman	52 episodes
2010	Memphis Beat	Jimmy Masterson	Episode: "Love Her Tender"
2010	Grey's Anatomy	Ivan Fink	Episode: "Can't Fight Biology"
2011	The Glades	Ed Vickers	Episode: "Iron Pipeline"
2012	Harry's Law	Sam Berman	5 episodes
2013	Shameless	Christopher Collier	2 episodes
2013	Mike & Molly	Mr. O'Donnell	Episode: "Poker in the Front, Looker in the Back"
2014	Dallas	Howard Rieder	Episode: "Trust Me"
2014	Californication	Couples Counsellor	Episode: "Faith, Hope, Love"
2014	Manhattan	Niels Bohr	Episode: "Last Reasoning of Kings"
2014	Legends	Mr. Porter	3 episodes
2014–2017	Turn: Washington's Spies	Martin De Young	7 episodes
2015	Masters of Sex	Leslie Riordan	Episode: "Undue Influence"
2016	American Crime Story: The People vs. O.J. Simpson	Bill Hodgman	5 episodes
2017	Colony	Dan Bennett	10 episodes
2017	Lifeline	Dugan Morris	Episode: "There's a Chip in Her Arm"
2019	9-1-1	Franklin Prentiss	Episode: "Ocean's 9-1-1"
2019	Law & Order: Special Victims Unit	Forreston Graham	Episode: "The Burden of Our Choices"
2021	The Good Doctor	Dr. Silas Chambers	Episode: "Teeny Blue Eyes"
2022–2023	Julia	James Beard	2 episodes
2024	A Man in Full	Wismer Stroock	5 episodes
2026	Widow's Bay	Dr. Morgan	4 episodes
