= How to Get Away with Murder season 2 =

How to Get Away with Murder
- Season 2
- Promotional poster and home media cover art
- Starring: Viola Davis; Billy Brown; Alfred Enoch; Jack Falahee; Aja Naomi King; Matt McGorry; Karla Souza; Charlie Weber; Liza Weil
- No. of episodes: 15

Release
- Original network: ABC
- Original release: September 24, 2015 – March 17, 2016

Season chronology
- ← Previous; Season 1 Next → Season 3

The second season of the ABC American television drama series How to Get Away with Murder was ordered on May 7, 2015, by ABC. The second season began airing on September 24, 2015, and consisted of 15 episodes, concluding on March 17, 2016. A promotional poster was released on August 18, and the trailer was released on September 10.

In its second season, the series has continued to receive accolades; the show has been nominated for Outstanding Drama Series at the Image Awards as well as the GLAAD Awards. Viola Davis has won the Screen Actors Guild Award for Outstanding Performance in a Drama Series and has been nominated for Outstanding Lead Actress in a Drama Series at the Primetime Emmy Awards, Outstanding Actress in a Drama Series at the Image Awards, Best Actress in a Drama Series at the Critics' Choice Awards, and Best Actress in a Television Series at the Golden Globe Awards.

== Cast and characters ==
=== Main ===
- Viola Davis as Annalise Keating
- Billy Brown as Nate Lahey
- Alfred Enoch as Wes Gibbins
- Jack Falahee as Connor Walsh
- Aja Naomi King as Michaela Pratt
- Matt McGorry as Asher Millstone
- Karla Souza as Laurel Castillo
- Charlie Weber as Frank Delfino
- Liza Weil as Bonnie Winterbottom

=== Recurring ===
- Tom Verica as Sam Keating
- Sarah Burns as Emily Sinclair
- Kendrick Sampson as Caleb Hapstall
- Amy Okuda as Catherine Hapstall
- Famke Janssen as Eve Rothlo
- Conrad Ricamora as Oliver Hampton
- Adam Arkin as Wallace Mahoney
- John Posey as William Millstone
- Matt Cohen as Levi Wescott
- Jefferson White as Philip Jessup
- Kelsey Scott as Rose Edmond
- Issac Ryan Brown as Christophe Edmond
- Alexandra Metz as Melanie Dalton
- Benito Martinez as Todd Denver

=== Guest ===
- Katie Findlay as Rebecca Sutter
- Joan McMurtrey as Helena Hapstall
- Sherri Saum as Tanya Randolph
- Enuka Okuma as Nia Lahey
- Alexandra Billings as Jill Hartford
- Wilson Bethel as Charles Mahoney
- Roxanne Hart as Sylvia Mahoney
- Jennifer Parsons as Lydia Millstone
- Cicely Tyson as Ophelia Harkness
- Emily Swallow as Lisa Cameron
- Roger Robinson as Mac Harkness
- Gwendolyn Mulamba as Celestine Harkness

== Episodes ==
No. overall	No. in season	Title	Directed by	Written by	Original release date	U.S. viewers (millions)
16	1	"It's Time to Move On"	Bill D'Elia	Peter Nowalk	September 24, 2015	8.38
Annalise and her students try to move on after Rebecca's disappearance, while Frank and Annalise discuss who killed Rebecca. Wes begins to act out in class, but after confronting Annalise about her suspicion of him, he apologizes. Meanwhile, Annalise takes the case of Caleb and Catherine Hapstall, adult adopted siblings accused of murdering their wealthy parents. The prime witness in the case, the siblings' aunt, is murdered after testifying in court. It is revealed that Bonnie killed Rebecca in order to protect Annalise. Annalise asks lawyer Eve Rothlo, later revealed to be Annalise's ex-lover, to take Nate's case, which she agrees to. Connor proves his commitment to Oliver by moving into his apartment, while Michaela attempts to contact "EGGS911", the person Rebecca texted, and she receives a return text. Annalise takes her students dancing after being reminded of her earlier days at law school with Eve. Flashforward: Two months later, a gun shot is heard in the Hapstall mansion, and Wes runs away from the mansion, where Annalise lies in a pool of blood after being shot.
17	2	"She's Dying"	Rob Hardy	Erika Green Swafford	October 1, 2015	7.53
Annalise and her team are blindsided when investigators try to pin a new charge on the wealthy siblings she's been hired to represent. Meanwhile, things for Annalise become even more difficult when she is brutally cross-examined on the witness stand during Nate's preliminary hearing. Flashforward: Two months later, Connor is with Annalise as Wes, Michaela and Laurel run into the mansion to get him. As they run out of the home, another dead body is seen on the ground. It is revealed to be the new DA on the Hapstall case, Emily Sinclair.
18	3	"It's Called the Octopus"	John Terlesky	Joe Fazzio	October 8, 2015	7.22
When Annalise takes on a new client, the team must investigate a high-end sex club to get answers. Meanwhile, Annalise is still representing the Hapstall siblings, but the case takes a turn for the worse when a new motive surfaces; there is a picture of the siblings appearing to share a romantic moment the day of the murder. Wes discovers that the man Michaela has been seeing, Levi, is Rebecca's foster brother. After Wes hears Levi's suggestion that Annalise murdered Rebecca, he begins plotting revenge and convinces Nate to join in. Flashforward: Seven weeks later, Annalise, alone and slowly dying, attempts to answer her phone when Nate calls. As the four students run, they see a police car approach them and hide. The officer turns out to be Nate, who tells them to quickly get into the car so they can leave.
19	4	"Skanks Get Shanked"	Stephen Williams	Angela Robinson	October 15, 2015	6.81
Annalise is hired to defend a teenage girl who, along with two other popular girls in her school, killed her best friend in cold blood. Meanwhile, Annalise sends Michaela to Caleb and Catherine to find out the truth about the accusations being made against them. Nate's bedridden wife Nia asks Annalise to meet her and requests she do something for her. Nate, Wes, and Levi try to find out what happened to Rebecca. Flashforward: Four weeks later, the authorities have arrived at the crime scene. As the ambulance races to the hospital, the medics do everything they can to save Annalise's life. Nate is driving the students away and attempts to calm them down when Michaela gets a phone call. Michaela is dropped off at her apartment with specific orders from the gang. When she enters, she is met by Caleb, who asks how "she" (unknown to the viewers) is doing.
20	5	"Meet Bonnie"	Stephen Cragg	Sarah L. Thompson	October 22, 2015	6.95
Asher discovers that not everything is what it seems when you work for Annalise. While Annalise tries to reassure Asher, a glimpse of Bonnie's terrifying past is revealed as Annalise reveals to Asher that Bonnie was raped by her father. Meanwhile, Frank is presented with a situation that hits close to home, and Wes' search to find out more about Rebecca's disappearance culminates in an explosive confrontation. Flashforward: Bonnie and Asher are fleeing the Hapstall Mansion sometime after Sinclair's death, but before the ambulance's arrival. They stop at a rest stop, where Bonnie goes to the bathroom to wash blood off herself and dispose of her blood-stained clothes. She returns to find Asher gone.
21	6	"Two Birds, One Millstone"	Mike Listo	Michael Foley	October 29, 2015	6.27
Annalise takes on a new client, a transgender professor accused of killing her husband. Meanwhile, the Keating Five are left to handle the Hapstall case and they discover a shocking new suspect. Nate's wife passes away. Laurel meets Frank's family. The DA starts a corruption investigation into Asher's father with the information Annalise gives him. Annalise and Wes have a confrontation about Rebecca. It is discovered by Oliver that Helena Hapstall had a secret son, Philip Jessup. Flashforward: Frank is seen at the hospital when the ambulance carrying Annalise arrives. He acts upset about her condition only to appear calm as soon as he leaves. When he gets in his car, an unconscious Catherine is seen in the back seat. He is then seen carrying her to the woods at night. When she is discovered by the police in the morning, she suddenly wakes up.
22	7	"I Want You to Die"	Kevin Bray	Warren Hsu Leonard	November 5, 2015	6.49
Annalise's new client is a man accused of making his ex-wife's husband commit suicide, while Frank brings in Oliver to help with the Hapstall case. Eve is back representing Nate, who is now accused of killing his wife. Bonnie is struggling to come to terms with what Sinclair told her about Trotter Lake and Asher's involvement; she discovers Annalise told Asher about her past. After attempting to get DNA from Philip, Oliver returns home to wait for Connor, only to see Philip in his house. Flashforward: Wes and Laurel listen to Connor and Michaela before Wes says he will "stop them," running outside with gun in hand. Outside, Wes yells to them; Connor and Michaela turn around, only to see Emily Sinclair falling to her death. Bonnie is shown standing above.
23	8	"Hi, I'm Philip"	Jennifer Getzinger	Tanya Saracho	November 12, 2015	6.71
Connor returns home to find Oliver gone. He confronts Annalise and everyone at the office and, as they are about to call the police, Oliver and Philip arrive. Annalise tries to apologize to Philip and he leaves after blackmailing Annalise and explaining that he's not the killer. Oliver reveals that he kept one of the straws that Philip used at the diner where they had been talking. After being taunted by Annalise, Frank uses some of his money from a suitcase to pay off a nurse to get the DNA results from the Hapstall crime scene and Philip's straw. The match is 99.4%, resulting in both Caleb and Catherine turning down their plea deals. The DNA also confirms Philip is a product of incest, being the child of Helena Hapstall and her only brother, Catherine and Caleb's adoptive father. Catherine sends one of her paintings as thanks to Wes. As Wes goes over the case file photos, he notices that in the background of Philip's screenshot is one of Catherine's paintings and informs Annalise and Nate. In the end, a nervous Catherine waits in her car until Philip gets in and says, "Don't worry. I'll take care of it," while Caleb simultaneously reveals to Michaela a gun he apparently found in Catherine's studio. Flashforward: Wes, Connor, Michaela, and Laurel come back into the house and Bonnie takes the gun from Wes. After Connor insists on leaving, Bonnie threatens Connor, stating he'd be the next dead body if he left.
24	9	"What Did We Do?"	Bill D'Elia	Michael Foley & Erika Green Swafford	November 19, 2015	7.19
Catherine runs away after being confronted by Michaela, Caleb, and Connor about the gun. Asher's father commits suicide, leading Asher's mother to disown him. Sinclair accuses Nate of tampering with Philip's file, triggering an outburst from Nate that almost gets him fired. In retaliation, Nate files a harassment lawsuit, based on racism, against Sinclair. After Sinclair badmouths Asher's father, Asher runs her over with his car, killing her. Annalise frantically tries to help cover everything up by having Frank find Catherine and frame her for Sinclair's murder, and has Asher and Bonnie throw Sinclair's body off of the roof to make it look like the cause of death. Annalise tries desperately to get one of the Keating Four to shoot her, intending to blame it on Catherine. When none of the students are willing to shoot Annalise, she reveals to Wes that Rebecca is dead, leading Wes to shoot her in the gut instead of the leg like she planned. Wes is about to shoot Annalise again; he points the gun at her face at close range, but before he can squeeze the trigger, Annalise whispers Wes' birth name, Christophe. Shocked that Annalise knows his real name, he puts the gun down. Flashback: A 12-year-old Wes is being interviewed by a detective about his mother's suicide. It is revealed that a young Annalise and Eve Rothlo are watching his interview, with Eve saying, "Good God, Annalise, what did we do?"
25	10	"What Happened to You, Annalise?"	Laura Innes	J. C. Lee	February 11, 2016	5.82
A few weeks after being shot, Annalise returns home from the hospital with help from Bonnie. The students try to deal with the fallout of "murder night", with Wes suffering a large amount of guilt over shooting Annalise. Meanwhile, Annalise starts to hallucinate about a baby because of her medication, which causes trouble for her in court when she is forced to take the stand regarding her shooting. Asher crashes at Connor and Oliver's place after struggling with having killed Sinclair. Flashback: A pregnant Annalise meets Wes' mother, Rose, with them talking and watching a young Wes play kickball.
26	11	"She Hates Us"	Bill D'Elia	Erika Harrison	February 18, 2016	4.88
Wes visits the doctor to get sleeping pills because his guilt has been causing insomnia, but after joking about suicide, he is checked into the psych ward. Laurel tries to convince Annalise to help Wes, but she refuses. Meanwhile, Annalise and her team take on the case of a teenager, Jason, who murdered another teenager, with the victim's mother trying to reduce Jason's sentence as she doesn't want to ruin his entire life. However, it is revealed that Jason did in fact kill the victim on purpose, and he is sent to jail, but not before the victim's mother promises to stay in his life. After learning about Wes being in the psych ward, the Keating Five refuse to work for Annalise and shut her out of their lives. Laurel and Frank argue about their relationship, with Frank revealing to her that he killed Lila. Connor calls Annalise, panicked that he received an email from Philip with footage of them on the murder night that links them to what happened. Flashback: Annalise struggles with her pregnancy. The beginnings of Frank and Bonnie's careers working for Annalise are shown. Sam worries about Annalise and the baby, but the ultrasound is clear. Annalise presents a case file to Rose.
27	12	"It's a Trap"	Mike Listo	Joe Fazzio & Tanya Saracho	February 25, 2016	4.86
Philip issues an ultimatum: the team must transfer $1 million to him in the next 36 hours or he'll send the footage to the police. Annalise tries to handle the situation, while Wes and Laurel try to put the pieces of Rose's death together, traveling to Ohio to get the case files. After not finding anything, the two bond and share a brief kiss. Meanwhile, Connor reveals to Oliver his own plan to move to Stanford Law School, and wants to be accompanied by him. Annalise and Nate make up, and he gives her advice regarding Philip's threat. After 36 hours, Annalise and the students don't pay the demand, and Philip instead sends a video of Annalise and Nate taken the night before, as he is spying on them. Laurel confronts Annalise about the police report regarding Wes' mother's suicide, questioning if Wes murdered his mother. Flashback: Annalise travels to Ohio with Frank to defend Charles Mahoney in court, with Rose testifying to seeing Charles the night his fiancée was murdered. After Rose fails to appear in court, Annalise is almost fired by Charles' parents. She confronts Rose about it, but the latter refuses to talk.
28	13	"Something Bad Happened"	Zetna Fuentes	Michael Foley & Warren Hsu Leonard	March 3, 2016	4.53
As Laurel confronts Annalise, Wes visits his doctor again to discuss the same thing—that he could be the one who murdered his mother. Shortly after Philip sends a video of Michaela's previous visit to Caleb, Annalise decides to ask the new ADA, Todd Denver, for blanket immunity to cover the team for Sinclair's murder in exchange for using all of Philip's emails to track his whereabouts, much to Denver's curiosity about what they did at the Hapstall mansion—the "crime scene"—that night. Later, Laurel and Frank put an end to their relationship, as Bonnie overhears. Finding that Eve knows about his mother, Wes visits her in New York; at the same time, Annalise visits his apartment only to find no one but Philip, who then attacks her as she tells Eve on the phone to call 911. Flashback: Rose is visited by ICE, who appoints Eve Rothlo to represent her in a case regarding her illegal entrance into the U.S. (as she is originally from Haiti), all at Annalise's suggestion. Annalise and Eve argue about their past concerning the former's first encounter with Sam. After Charles' father, Wallace Mahoney, threatens Wes' safety, Annalise confronts Rose; the latter then kills herself in front of the former, but not before asking her to take care of Wes. As Annalise flees the scene, Wes enters, finds his dying mother, and calls 911, saying, "Something bad happened."
29	14	"There's My Baby"	Stephen Williams	J.C. Lee & Erika Harrison	March 10, 2016	4.80
Annalise manages to escape from Philip and returns to her office with Eve and Wes. The next morning, Nate comes to reveal that Caleb is missing and, shortly thereafter, ADA Denver wants to interrogate everyone caught on Philip's videos (and later, Asher, who is not in any of the videos but was placed at the courthouse parking garage by a witness, the last place Sinclair was seen alive). Annalise starts drinking, much to Bonnie's concern after she finds out. Annalise later kicks out everyone but Wes, to share a drink as she explains the truth about Wes' mother to him. Later, Oliver reveals to Connor that he has quit his job, Michaela and Asher share an unexpected moment, and Bonnie knows that Sam had Frank kill Lila. Pressured after hearing a drunken Laurel tell Annalise that she herself had Frank kill Lila, the latter escapes to her mother Ophelia's house. Flashback: Annalise and Eve watch the FBI question Wes. Later, Wallace shows up at Annalise's room, threatening to fire her, but before he eventually does so, she reveals the reason Rose felt threatened by him: he raped Rose a long time ago; thus, Christophe/Wes is also his son. En route to the police station to reveal this, Annalise gets in a car accident, causing her son to be stillborn.
30	15	"Anna Mae"	Bill D'Elia	Peter Nowalk	March 17, 2016	5.29
Ophelia throws a welcome-back party for Annalise. Annalise's estranged father is present, and Ophelia has been seeing him. At Annalise's office, the team learn that Denver has issued an arrest warrant, and suspect an inside informant. Laurel reveals to Frank that Wes' father is Wallace Mahoney. Oliver tracks Annalise's whereabouts, and Nate goes to Memphis to meet her. They have dinner with her family, where Annalise is reluctant to talk to her father (who left the family when she was a child), and tells her mother about her earlier pregnancy. The next morning, Annalise returns to Middleton and meets Denver, revealing that Caleb was the serial killer (and the informant), per evidence from Caleb's fitness tracker, procured by Philip, and Catherine's changed testimony: she is in love with Caleb and suspects that he killed their adoptive parents to inherit their wealth. As the police begin searching for Caleb, he is shown to have committed suicide. Later, Oliver impersonates Connor to decline the latter's place at Stanford and delete his acceptance email. Annalise tells Bonnie, who reveals what Frank did, that Frank "needs to go." Laurel visits Frank's apartment, but finds that he has already left town with his suitcase of money. Wes meets Wallace for the first time, only for Wallace to be shot in the head right in front of him. Flashback: It is revealed that the woman Frank meets in the previous episode is working for Wallace; she offers Frank the reward of a suitcase full of money for bugging Annalise's room, which he does, and, after hearing Annalise is about to disclose the truth to the FBI agent who interrogated Wes, she calls Wallace, who asks her to "take care of it," meaning that the car accident is by design. Frank reveals this to Sam, pointing out that Wallace wants to get a mistrial; the latter threatens to ruin the former's life if he reveals it to Annalise. It is subsequently revealed that this is what Frank "owes" Sam, settled by his murdering a pregnant Lila.

== Production ==
=== Development ===
The series was renewed for a second season on May 7, 2015, by ABC. The show was effectively confirmed as earning a second-season renewal for the 2015–16 season via a promo succeeding the first-season finale and an earlier statement by Viola Davis also confirming the renewal at the close of shooting for the first season. It would contain 15 episodes, like the previous season. Entertainment Weekly reported on July 23, 2015, that the identity of Rebecca's killer would be revealed in the season premiere. A promotional poster was released over a month before the season premiere, on August 17, 2015.

The second season began airing on September 24, 2015, and aired nine episodes in the fall, just like the rest of ABC's primetime lineup "TGIT" Grey's Anatomy and Scandal. The remaining fall schedule for ABC was announced on November 16, 2015, where it was announced that How to Get Away with Murder would air nine episodes in the fall with the fall finale to air on November 19, 2015, just like the rest of ABC's primetime lineup "TGIT", which was the same last year. The remaining six episodes aired after the winter break, beginning on February 11, 2016, as a result of ABC airing the television miniseries Madoff over two nights on February 3–4, 2016 in the same time-slot as Scandal and Grey's Anatomy. It aired its season finale on March 17, 2016, with The Catch succeeding it for the remainder of the 2015–16 season after its finale. On March 3, 2016, ABC announced that How to Get Away with Murder was renewed for a third season.

=== Filming ===
Production began on May 21, 2015, with Shonda Rhimes announcing on Twitter that Peter Nowalk and his writers were in full swing mapping the second season. The table read for the premiere occurred on July 14, 2015, with the title of the episode being revealed at the same time.

=== Casting ===
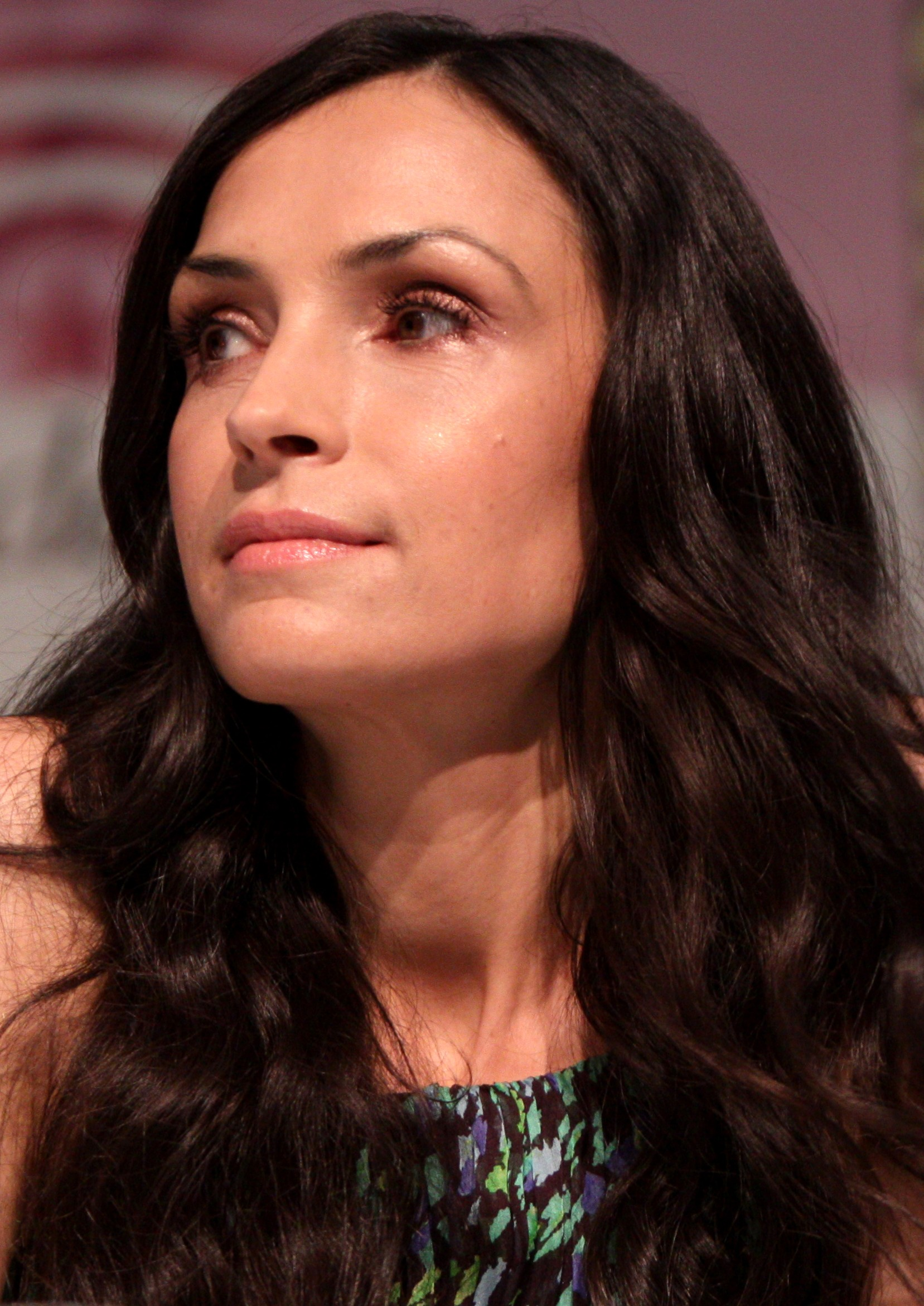
Famke Janssen was cast as Defense Attorney. Eve Rothlo.

The second season had nine roles receiving star billing, with all of them returning from the previous season. Viola Davis played the protagonist of the series, Professor Annalise Keating, a high-profile defense attorney, teaching a class at Middleton University. Billy Brown played Detective Nate Lahey, Annalise's lover. There are five students who work at Annalise's law firm. Alfred Enoch portrayed Wes Gibbins, as he was devastated about Rebecca escaping. Jack Falahee portrayed Connor Walsh, the ruthless student who found himself in a situation where his boyfriend Oliver Hampton, played by Conrad Ricamora, had received news of having HIV. Aja Naomi King played Michaela Pratt, the ambitious student who wanted to be as successful as Annalise. Matt McGorry continued portraying Asher Millstone, a student who comes from a privileged background. Karla Souza played Laurel Castillo, an idealistic student. Charlie Weber portrayed Frank Delfino, an employee of Annalise's firm who is not a lawyer but handles special duties requiring discretion. Liza Weil played Bonnie Winterbottom, who is an associate attorney in Annalise's firm.

It was announced on July 14, 2015, that the second season would introduce several new characters, including a family consisting of Caleb, Catherine and Helena Hapstall. Katie Findlay returned to play the character Rebecca Sutter, who was killed in the first-season finale. Tom Verica also appeared in the season as the deceased Sam Keating, and appeared in flashbacks. On July 22, 2015, it was announced that Kendrick Sampson, known from The Vampire Diaries would join the cast in the second season and was introduced in the season premiere. On July 31, 2015, TVLine reported that Famke Janssen was cast as a brilliant, revered defense attorney for a multi-episode arc and would first appear in the season premiere.

Matt Cohen was announced on August 11, 2015, to recur in the second season as Levi, who was described as a sexy, edgy working class guy. He first appeared in the second episode and appeared in a total of three episodes. On August 31, 2015, Variety reported that Amy Okuda would play a recurring role, but details on Okuda's part were being kept under wraps. Sherri Saum was announced to have been cast as a guest star on September 30, 2015. On January 14, 2016, it was announced that Wilson Bethel, Adam Arkin and Roxanne Hart would be joining the show to play the Mahoney family. Bethel played Charles Mahoney, the Ivy League-educated son, with Arkin playing his father Wallace and Hart playing his mother Sylvia.

== Reception ==
=== Critical response ===
The second season received positive reviews. On Rotten Tomatoes, it has an approval rating of 95%, based on 5 reviews, with an average rating of 8.5 out of 10. Lesley Brock, Paste Magazine, praised the second season writing: "I would not put it past How to Get Away with Murder, which has turned all other ABC show plot lines upside down on their heads and shown that nothing is impossible, to throw incest into an already haphazard mix." Brock gave the season a score of 9 out of 10. Kyle Anderson, Entertainment Weekly, wrote that with Davis at the front the show can get away with anything.

=== Ratings ===
Viewership and ratings per episode of How to Get Away with Murder season 2
No.	Title	Air date	Rating/share (18–49)	Viewers (millions)	DVR (18–49)	DVR viewers (millions)	Total (18–49)	Total viewers (millions)
1	"It's Time to Move On"	September 24, 2015	2.6/9	8.38	1.7	4.62	4.3	12.99
2	"She's Dying"	October 1, 2015	2.3/8	7.53	1.8	4.29	4.1	11.82
3	"It's Called the Octopus"	October 8, 2015	2.2/7	7.22	1.5	4.00	3.7	11.22
4	"Skanks Get Shanked"	October 15, 2015	2.0/7	6.81	1.6	4.04	3.6	10.85
5	"Meet Bonnie"	October 22, 2015	2.1/7	6.95	1.6	3.99	3.7	10.94
6	"Two Birds, One Millstone"	October 29, 2015	1.8/6	6.27	1.7	4.08	3.5	10.35
7	"I Want You to Die"	November 5, 2015	1.9/6	6.49	1.7	4.00	3.6	10.49
8	"Hi, I'm Philip"	November 12, 2015	1.9/6	6.71	1.7	3.81	3.6	10.52
9	"What Did We Do?"	November 19, 2015	2.3/8	7.19	1.6	3.98	3.9	11.16
10	"What Happened to You, Annalise?"	February 11, 2016	1.8/6	5.82	1.8	4.25	3.6	10.07
11	"She Hates Us"	February 18, 2016	1.5/5	4.88	1.5	3.91	3.0	8.78
12	"It's a Trap"	February 25, 2016	1.5/5	4.86	1.6	3.83	3.1	8.69
13	"Something Bad Happened"	March 3, 2016	1.4/5	4.53	1.5	3.84	2.9	8.37
14	"There's My Baby"	March 10, 2016	1.4/5	4.80	1.5	3.92	2.9	8.72
15	"Anna Mae"	March 17, 2016	1.4/5	5.29	1.5	3.63	2.9	8.93

=== Accolades ===
Award	Category	Nominee	Result
People's Choice Award	Favorite Network TV Drama	How to Get Away with Murder	Nominated
People's Choice Award	Favorite Dramatic TV Actress	Viola Davis	Nominated
NAACP Image Award	Entertainer of the Year	Viola Davis	Nominated
NAACP Image Award	Outstanding Drama Series	How to Get Away With Murder	Nominated
NAACP Image Award	Outstanding Actress in a Drama Series	Viola Davis	Nominated
NAACP Image Award	Outstanding Supporting Actor in a Drama Series	Alfred Enoch	Nominated
NAACP Image Award	Outstanding Supporting Actress in a Drama Series	Cicely Tyson	Nominated
NAACP Image Award	Outstanding Writer for a Drama Series ·	Erika Green Swafford, Doug Stockstill ("Mama's Here Now")	Nominated
Screen Actors Guild Award	Outstanding Performance by a Female Actor in a Drama Series	Viola Davis	Won
Golden Globe Award	Best Actress in a Television Series – Drama	Viola Davis	Nominated
Critics' Choice Award	Best Actress in a Drama Series	Viola Davis	Nominated
GLAAD Media Award	Outstanding Drama Series	How to Get Away With Murder	Nominated
Gold Derby Award	Best Drama Actress	Viola Davis	Nominated
Gold Derby Award	Best Drama Guest Actress	Famke Janssen	Nominated
Primetime Emmy Award	Outstanding Lead Actress in a Drama Series	Viola Davis	Nominated

Critics' top ten lists

- No. 10 TVLine

== DVD release ==
The DVD was first released in Region 1 on June 21, 2016.

The Complete Second Season
Set Details		Special Features
15 Episodes; English, French and Spanish subtitles		Deleted Scenes - Unseen moments from Season 2; Bloopers
Release Dates
Region 1	Region 2	Region 4
June 21, 2016	November 14, 2016	TBA
