= How to Get Away with Murder season 4 =

How to Get Away with Murder
- Season 4
- Promotional poster
- Starring: Viola Davis; Billy Brown; Jack Falahee; Aja Naomi King; Matt McGorry; Conrad Ricamora; Karla Souza; Charlie Weber; Liza Weil
- No. of episodes: 15

Release
- Original network: ABC
- Original release: September 28, 2017 – March 15, 2018

Season chronology
- ← Previous; Season 3 Next → Season 5

The fourth season of the ABC American television drama series How to Get Away with Murder was ordered on February 10, 2017, by ABC. It began airing on September 28, 2017, and consisted of 15 episodes, concluding on March 15, 2018.

== Cast and characters ==
=== Main ===
- Viola Davis as Annalise Keating
- Billy Brown as Nate Lahey
- Jack Falahee as Connor Walsh
- Aja Naomi King as Michaela Pratt
- Matt McGorry as Asher Millstone
- Conrad Ricamora as Oliver Hampton
- Karla Souza as Laurel Castillo
- Charlie Weber as Frank Delfino
- Liza Weil as Bonnie Winterbottom

=== Recurring ===
- Jimmy Smits as Isaac Roa
- Esai Morales as Jorge Castillo
- Benito Martinez as Todd Denver
- Behzad Dabu as Simon Drake
- Amirah Vann as Tegan Price
- Nicholas Gonzalez as Dominic
- Lolita Davidovich as Sandrine Castillo
- John Hensley as Ronald Miller
- Glynn Turman as Nate Lahey Sr.

=== Special guest ===
- Kerry Washington as Olivia Pope

=== Guest ===
- Cicely Tyson as Ophelia Harkness
- Roger Robinson as Mac Harkness
- Gwendolyn Mulamba as Celestine Harkness
- Julius Tennon as Desmond
- Stephanie Faracy as Ellen Freeman
- L. Scott Caldwell as Jasmine Bromelle
- Marianne Jean-Baptiste as Virginia Cross
- Cristine Rose as Wenona Sansbury
- D. W. Moffett as Jeff Walsh
- Jim Abele as Ted Walsh
- Luna Vélez as Soraya Hargrove
- Kathryn Erbe as Jacqueline Roa
- Oded Fehr as Chase
- Alfred Enoch as Wes Gibbins
- Cornelius Smith Jr. as Marcus Walker
- Tom Irwin as Spivey
- Sharon Lawrence as Ingrid Egan
- Yolonda Ross as Claudia
- Tom Verica as Sam Keating
- Melinda Page Hamilton as Claire Telesco
- Rome Flynn as Gabriel Maddox

== Episodes ==
No. overall	No. in season	Title	Directed by	Written by	Original release date	U.S. viewers (millions)
46	1	"I'm Going Away"	Jet Wilkinson	Peter Nowalk	September 28, 2017	3.96
Annalise hosts a dinner to dismiss the Keating Four and Bonnie from their jobs, to convince them to move on and seek new opportunities. During a flight to visit her mother, she meets a man named Desmond and later calls him for casual sex at his hotel, but stops his advances and walks out after suspecting he is married. Stressed by her mother's dementia, Annalise considers placing her in a nursing home. Connor rejects Oliver's marriage proposal, stating that he wants them to get married when the time is right. Laurel correctly suspects that her father, Jorge, was involved in Wes' death and decides to have her baby. Michaela and Asher apply for internships at a law firm. Bonnie has a job interview at the courthouse with DA Todd Denver. Back from visiting her mother, Annalise attends a court hearing and is reinstated as a lawyer after agreeing to attend therapy sessions with Dr. Isaac Roa. Flashforward: Three months later, Frank and Isaac rush into a hospital room where Laurel is unconscious. Frank wakes her up, and she panics upon realizing her baby is gone.
47	2	"I'm Not Her"	Paris Barclay	Maya Goldsmith	October 5, 2017	3.88
During her second session with Isaac, Annalise tells him how her week went when she decided to take the case of Jasmine, one of her cellmates from when she was in prison. The Keating Four try to move on with their lives by getting interviews at the Middleton Law job fair. Nate suspects Annalise is plotting something when he finds out Bonnie is working for the DA's office. With help from Connor, Laurel continues to investigate her father Jorge's company and his involvement in Wes' death. Laurel finds out Michaela accepted an offer for a job at Caplan & Gold, the firm that represents Jorge's company. Laurel tells Michaela she suspects Jorge killed Wes, and asks for her help in bringing him down. Flashforward: Two and a half months later, Isaac calls Annalise, but she does not answer. On her way to Annalise's hotel room, Bonnie walks into a new crime scene; she then makes her way to the elevator, where there are bloody handprints.
48	3	"It's for the Greater Good"	Nicole Rubio	Erika Harrison	October 12, 2017	3.88
Annalise takes on a case and quickly realizes the stakes are much higher than she originally thought. Laurel asks Michaela to help her get information regarding Wes' death, and Connor decides to withdraw from law school. Flashforward: Two months later, Isaac runs into Michaela; she is covered in blood and heavily distraught, looking through the window of a nursery and asking where Laurel's baby is.
49	4	"Was She Ever Good at Her Job?"	Mike Smith	Michael Russo	October 19, 2017	3.56
Annalise and Michaela are forced to work together on a case involving the Middleton University president, Soraya Hargrove. Oliver gets in touch with Connor's fathers, hoping to reconnect him with his biological father, Jeff. At the courthouse, Denver discovers that Bonnie hired Laurel and orders her to fire her, but Bonnie responds that Laurel might file a discrimination lawsuit due to her pregnancy. Bonnie arrives for a session with Isaac under the fake name Julie. Flashforward: One and a half months later, Bonnie tries to get in touch with Isaac, who is preoccupied consoling a distraught Michaela. She walks into the Caplan & Gold building, where a pool of blood is seen on the floor and Oliver is shown to have been a witness.
50	5	"I Love Her"	Lexi Alexander	Sarah L. Thompson	October 26, 2017	3.56
In need of forty clients, Annalise continues collecting cases for her class action suit. Bonnie sends Nate to investigate, but he actually warns her. Michaela and Oliver use Tegan's computer to access Antares' files, only to find a cease and desist letter the firm sent to an Antares employee who was murdered. With all her secrecy, Asher begins to doubt Michaela. Frank asks Laurel if the baby is really Wes', making her angry and distraught for cheating on Wes. Annalise succeeds in getting the necessary forty clients, only to lose a majority of them as Bonnie lures each into a plea deal out of spite. Isaac discovers that Julie is actually Bonnie and the "Mae" she has been referring to all along is Annalise. Flashback: In 2002, Annalise defends a councilman accused of rape by Bonnie. Despite winning the case, Annalise resigns from her law firm out of guilt over how she treated Bonnie on the stand. Afterwards, she approaches Bonnie, suggesting she become a lawyer. Flashforward: Two weeks later, Bonnie investigates the crime scene at Caplan & Gold and learns that the suspect, revealed to be Asher, is in jail, in distress and crying.
51	6	"Stay Strong, Mama"	Cherie Nowlan	Morenike Balogun	November 2, 2017	3.56
In an attempt to derail Annalise's class action suit, Denver threatens to seize the family home of Claudia, another former inmate of Annalise's, if she does not withdraw from the lawsuit. Annalise retaliates by having Claudia's son, Tyrone, read a statement to the governor in a press conference about the threats, therefore hurting Denver's bid for attorney general. Denver removes Bonnie from the lawsuit, believing that she is too emotionally invested. Annalise reveals to Isaac that, after her miscarriage, she attempted suicide. Though triggered by his similarities to Annalise's trauma, Isaac refuses to transfer Annalise to a new therapist, despite the requests of his own therapist, his ex-wife Jacqueline. Jorge visits Laurel to tell her that Antares is going public, leading Laurel to realize that he had Wes killed because Antares' reputation would have been damaged had Wes confessed about Sam and Rebecca's murders. Upon learning that Antares is having a security room installed at Caplan & Gold accessible by Tegan, among others, Oliver tries to convince Michaela to use Tegan's security badge to access the room, but she refuses. After being confronted by Asher, Michaela explains why she, Laurel, and Oliver were secretly meeting, but Asher storms out. Frank learns that he scored well on the Law School Admission Test and promises to be a good father to Laurel's baby. Flashforward: One week later, Isaac tries to contact Annalise, who is in the shower, distraught and washing blood off herself.
52	7	"Nobody Roots for Goliath"	Nzingha Stewart	Daniel Robinson	November 9, 2017	3.71
As Annalise tries to certify her class action lawsuit, the attorney general targets her alcoholism in an attempt to take her down, forcing her to figure out a way to rule out those accusations. Annalise also drops Isaac as her therapist after his ex-wife tells her that she is triggering him and may be threatening his sobriety. Asher convinces Laurel, Michaela, and Oliver to tell Frank about their plan, hoping he'll convince them out of it. Instead, Frank agrees to help them, as they are all intent on getting justice for Wes. Later that night, Connor proposes to Oliver, who reveals what the others have been up to and that they know who killed Wes. Flashforward: Two days later, a team of surgeons are operating on a patient who suddenly goes into cardiac arrest.
53	8	"Live. Live. Live."	Rob Hardy	Joe Fazzio	November 16, 2017	3.72
Canceling his proposal to Oliver, Connor confronts Laurel about her plan to expose Antares and her father for Wes' death, resulting in a fight between him and Frank. Despite Connor and Oliver's reluctance, they agree to steal Tegan's keycard and blame Simon. Connor decides to tell Annalise, who has resumed therapy with Isaac. At the party, Simon admits he loves Oliver and later catches Laurel, Michaela, and Asher as they try to escape with a hard drive containing all of Antares' files. Simon questions the group and finds a gun in Laurel's bag before accidentally shooting himself in the head, leading to Asher's arrest. In shock, Laurel leaves with the hard drive and heads to Annalise's hotel, where she goes into premature labor, having been struck earlier by Frank during his fight with Connor. Annalise finds her and performs CPR on the baby to save him. Simon goes into cardiac arrest during surgery.
54	9	"He's Dead"	Jet Wilkinson	Abby Ajayi	January 18, 2018	3.80
Laurel and the baby are brought into a hospital, where Annalise informs Connor of what happened to Laurel, which Dominic overhears, and then meets Frank. Laurel's baby is still alive. Michaela and Oliver are questioned; Michaela figures out that Asher was arrested because he admitted to police that he handled the gun, so both she and Oliver try telling the same story where Asher used the gun. Annalise soon finds out that Jorge, informed by Dominic of Laurel's plan, is taking Laurel's baby away and claiming that Laurel used drugs in order to take custody of his grandson. Annalise brings Isaac to help her evaluate Laurel and dismiss Jorge's accusations, but she is not able to stop the process in time and Jorge takes the baby to an unknown location. Bonnie informs Laurel, Frank, and Annalise that the hard drive was not on the elevator, and she and Nate help free Asher while the police investigate. Once Connor, Oliver, Michaela, and Asher meet up in the hospital, they all find out that Simon is still alive. Frank murders Dominic out of rage and plays a voicemail he found on Dominic's phone to Annalise: it is Wes calling his emergency contact, using his birth name "Christophe."
55	10	"Everything We Did Was for Nothing"	Jonathan Brown	Matthew Cruz	January 25, 2018	3.54
Laurel asks Annalise to get her out of the hospital. Michaela finds out that Annalise is not actually trying to get her out; when she confronts her, Annalise reveals she's worried about Laurel's mental state. Annalise assigns Connor, Oliver, and Asher to work on the class action suit. Michaela finds out that Laurel went into early labour because Frank hit her accidentally and tells both Annalise and Frank, so Annalise has Isaac evaluate Laurel for release. Oliver feels guilty over Simon's shooting and visits him, with Asher and Connor trying to make him feel better. Frank disposed of Dominic's body but kept his phone, and someone keeps calling; when Laurel hears the message Wes left on Dominic's voicemail, she decides to answer the phone—to everybody's surprise, the caller is her mother.
56	11	"He's a Bad Father"	Marta Cunningham	Maya Goldsmith	February 1, 2018	3.68
Laurel tells her mother, Sandrine Castillo, about Dominic's death, but lies that Jorge killed him and asks for her help to regain her son's custody in a hearing. Asher, Connor, and Oliver find out more about Nate's father, Nate Lahey Sr., who is mentally ill and has been in prison for decades. Before the custody hearing begins, Jorge claims to Laurel that he did not kill Wes. During the hearing, Annalise gets Sandrine and Isaac to testify for Laurel, but Jorge's lawyers discredit Isaac when they reveal he is a current suspect in his own daughter's suicide. As a result, Laurel loses custody of her son, though visiting privileges have yet to be decided. Annalise and Nate visit Nate's father, the latter hoping to mend their relationship and the former hoping to have him on her class action. Frank and Bonnie learn that Wes only called Dominic once, but he met with Sandrine the day before he died.
57	12	"Ask Him About Stella"	Stephen Cragg	Tess Leibowitz	February 8, 2018	3.26
Isaac falls back into his addiction after the custody trial, but he soon tells Annalise. She tells him she understands, but asks him to go to a meeting. Laurel waits to visit her son and the rest of the Keating Four try to help Annalise by writing an opening statement for the class action suit; Michaela and Connor compete over whose idea is the best. After a discovery, Annalise confronts Isaac about his daughter's death. Isaac confesses he had not been sober for 23 years, and that he staged his daughter's death as a suicide because she overdosed on his drugs. Annalise and Isaac fight and she leaves to reveal his addiction to Jacqueline. Annalise's class action is dismissed and Nate tells his father. Michaela convinces Annalise not to give up and convinces Connor and Oliver to get engaged again, while Connor decides to get back into law school. Frank confronts Laurel's mother about how she knew Wes, and Bonnie makes Denver drop the investigation into Isaac regarding his daughter's death. The episode ends with Annalise entering a conference held by a lady who fixes problems: Olivia Pope.
58	13	"Lahey v. Commonwealth of Pennsylvania"	Zetna Fuentes	Morenike Balogun & Sarah L. Thompson	March 1, 2018	4.14
Annalise gets Olivia Pope to help her with the class action and, after both of them get the case on the docket to be heard by the Supreme Court, they prepare Annalise to try the case. Michaela and Marcus Walker investigate someone giving info to one of the Supreme Court justices. During the stakeout, Michaela cheats on Asher with Marcus and her friends, save for Asher, notice the next day. Right before the class action starts, Annalise gets a call from Jacqueline Roa, who tells her Isaac has been hospitalized after an overdose and that she ruined him just like everything else in her life. Annalise panics, asking Olivia to take her place, but the latter convinces her to keep going. Annalise goes to the Supreme Court and the Justices' response is postponed. Frank and Bonnie continue to investigate Sandrine's involvement with Wes' death, and Frank finally reveals to Laurel that her mother is keeping something from her, showing her the recordings Wes made with her mother the day before he died. Annalise and Olivia say their goodbyes and Bonnie calls Annalise to tell her Simon is awake. This episode concluded a crossover event that began on Scandal with the episode "Allow Me to Reintroduce Myself".
59	14	"The Day Before He Died"	Scott Printz	Joe Fazzio	March 8, 2018	3.36
With Simon awake, Annalise sends Oliver to his hospital room to see how much he remembers. He is slowly regaining his memories, but later agrees to keep quiet after Annalise blackmails him. A recovering Isaac tells Annalise that they can't see each other anymore. Asher finds out Michaela cheated on him and confronts her about it. Laurel meets with Denver and obtains Sandrine's phone records from the day Wes died. She learns that Sandrine informed Jorge that Wes was going to testify, leading to Wes' death. Bonnie discovers that Denver is playing both sides and has the hard drive. After Bonnie tells this to Annalise on a voicemail, Nate informs her and Frank that there has been a car accident; a body is shown being taken away. Flashback: The day before Wes' death, he receives a call from Laurel's mother asking him to meet her; she asks him to stop seeing Laurel to protect her, offering him $100,000, but Wes refuses, as he loves Laurel. The night of the fire, Wes calls Sandrine and tells her he's going to turn himself in to the police. Out of options, Sandrine calls Jorge and tells him to "do something" about it.
60	15	"Nobody Else Is Dying"	Jet Wilkinson	Peter Nowalk	March 15, 2018	3.83
Foul play is suspected in DA Todd Denver's sudden death. Jorge Castillo calls Laurel, inquiring about the whereabouts of Sandrine, but Laurel says she doesn't know. The Keating Four—along with Oliver, Frank, and Annalise—are worried about the missing hard drive. Nate manages to recover Dominic's phone, the hard drive, and Denver's files on everyone. He lies to Bonnie, telling her that he destroyed their files. Believing that Simon is becoming a threat, Michaela calls ICE to have him deported. Annalise persuades Tegan into jumping ship to bring Jorge down, failure of which she might be charged as his co-conspirator. Annalise decides to call a truce by giving the hard drive to Jorge in exchange for giving up his custody battle—he is later arrested on multiple criminal charges, including Denver's suspected murder. Connor confesses that he actually failed out instead of dropping out, but applies to re-enroll. SCOTUS rules in favor of Annalise's class action. As Nate peruses the files, he finds out there is an unnamed presumed dead or missing child perceived to be alive. A young man, Gabriel Maddox, enrolls at Middleton, catching Frank's attention.

== Production ==
=== Development ===
How to Get Away with Murder was renewed for a fourth season on February 10, 2017, by ABC. Production began on May 8, 2017, when one of the writers of the show announced on Twitter that the writing staff was in full swing mapping and writing the fourth season. The table read occurred on July 14, 2017. Showrunner Peter Nowalk revealed the title of the season 4 premiere: "I'm Going Away".

=== Casting ===
The cast features nine major roles receiving star billing, all of them returning from the previous season. Viola Davis portrays the protagonist of the series, Professor Annalise Keating, a high-profile defense attorney. Billy Brown portrays Detective Nate Lahey, Annalise's boyfriend. There are four students who work at Annalise's law firm. Jack Falahee portrays Connor Walsh, a ruthless student. Aja Naomi King plays Michaela Pratt, an ambitious student who aims to be as successful as Annalise. Matt McGorry continues portraying Asher Millstone, a student from a privileged background. Karla Souza portrays Laurel Castillo, an idealistic student. Charlie Weber plays Frank Delfino, an employee of Annalise's firm who is not a lawyer but handles special duties requiring discretion. Liza Weil plays Bonnie Winterbottom, who is an associate attorney in Annalise's firm. Conrad Ricamora portrays Oliver Hampton, a hacker who is in a relationship with Connor.

In July 2017, Jimmy Smits was cast in an unspecified role. He plays Dr. Isaac Roa, Annalise's court-requested therapist. In August, Davis' husband, Julius Tennon, was confirmed to guest star. He plays Desmond, a man who flirts with Annalise during a flight. In September 2017, Natalie Abrams of EW.com revealed that D. W. Moffett was cast as Connor's father. In January 2018, it was announced that Lolita Davidovich would recur in the second half of the season. She plays the role of Sandrine Castillo, Laurel's mother.

=== Scandal crossover ===
On January 3, 2018, Scandal star Kerry Washington tweeted a photo to Viola Davis of herself in a "familiar" setting, that being a courthouse used for the set of How to Get Away with Murder. Fans began to speculate a possible crossover episode being in the works, which was only heightened when Davis tweeted out a photo in response, that being her on the set of Mellie Grant's (Bellamy Young) Oval Office. Later that day, the crossover was officially confirmed through a tweet by Scandal creator Shonda Rhimes.

How to Get Away with Murder creator Peter Nowalk later went on to share in an interview with Deadline:

At the beginning of the season, my writers and I were planning out Viola's entire arc and something in her story organically came up that was very appropriate for Scandal. When I went to Shonda, she heard it. I said, we don't have to do it, Viola's arc doesn't need this, but it's possible that their stories could cross really organically. She actually pulled up a clip of something from Scandal and their side of the story coalesced perfectly. So it was one of those serendipitous things where we both realized it was good for both characters, and it almost felt like we had been planning it since last season.

== Reception ==
=== Critical response ===
The review aggregator website Rotten Tomatoes gave the season a 100% approval rating, with an average rating of 7.9/10 based on 8 reviews. Maureen Lee Lenker of EW gave the premiere a B letter rating. Kayla Kumari Upadhyaya, writing for The A.V. Club, rated the premiere a A−, commenting, "It's a strange but ultimately satisfying premiere, standing out from the show's past premieres by going the slow character drama route rather than murder party." Ali Barthwell of Vulture rated the premiere a 4 out of 5 stars, glorifying Viola Davis' performance. Meghan De Maria of Refinery29 also praised Davis' acting, naming it the "glue that holds the series together".

=== Ratings ===
Viewership and ratings per episode of How to Get Away with Murder season 4
No.	Title	Air date	Rating/share (18–49)	Viewers (millions)	DVR (18–49)	DVR viewers (millions)	Total (18–49)	Total viewers (millions)
1	"I'm Going Away"	September 28, 2017	1.1/4	3.96	1.2	3.18	2.3	7.14
2	"I'm Not Her"	October 5, 2017	0.9/3	3.88	1.1	2.80	2.0	6.68
3	"It's for the Greater Good"	October 12, 2017	1.0/4	3.88	1.1	2.83	2.1	6.71
4	"Was She Ever Good at Her Job?"	October 19, 2017	0.9/4	3.56	1.1	2.80	2.0	6.36
5	"I Love Her"	October 26, 2017	0.9/3	3.56	1.1	2.78	2.0	6.35
6	"Stay Strong, Mama"	November 2, 2017	0.9/4	3.56	1.2	2.82	2.1	6.38
7	"Nobody Roots for Goliath"	November 9, 2017	0.9/3	3.71	1.0	2.59	1.9	6.30
8	"Live. Live. Live."	November 16, 2017	0.9/4	3.72	1.0	2.49	1.9	6.21
9	"He's Dead"	January 18, 2018	1.0/4	3.80	1.0	2.60	2.0	6.40
10	"Everything We Did Was for Nothing"	January 25, 2018	1.0/4	3.54	1.0	2.92	2.0	6.46
11	"He's a Bad Father"	February 1, 2018	1.0/4	3.68	1.0	2.55	2.0	6.24
12	"Ask Him About Stella"	February 8, 2018	0.8/3	3.26	1.0	2.54	1.8	5.80
13	"Lahey v. Commonwealth of Pennsylvania"	March 1, 2018	1.1/5	4.14	1.1	3.00	2.2	7.16
14	"The Day Before He Died"	March 8, 2018	0.9/4	3.36	0.9	2.61	1.8	5.97
15	"Nobody Else Is Dying"	March 15, 2018	1.0/4	3.83	0.8	2.31	1.8	6.14
