= How to Get Away with Murder season 3 =

Season of television series

How to Get Away with Murder
- Season 3
- Promotional poster
- Starring: Viola Davis; Billy Brown; Alfred Enoch; Jack Falahee; Aja Naomi King; Matt McGorry; Conrad Ricamora; Karla Souza; Charlie Weber; Liza Weil
- No. of episodes: 15

Release
- Original network: ABC
- Original release: September 22, 2016 – February 23, 2017

Season chronology
- ← Previous; Season 2 Next → Season 4

The third season of the ABC American television drama series How to Get Away with Murder was ordered on March 3, 2016, by ABC. It began airing on September 22, 2016, and consisted of 15 episodes, concluding on February 23, 2017.

== Cast and characters ==
=== Main ===
- Viola Davis as Annalise Keating
- Billy Brown as Nate Lahey
- Alfred Enoch as Wes Gibbins
- Jack Falahee as Connor Walsh
- Aja Naomi King as Michaela Pratt
- Matt McGorry as Asher Millstone
- Conrad Ricamora as Oliver Hampton
- Karla Souza as Laurel Castillo
- Charlie Weber as Frank Delfino
- Liza Weil as Bonnie Winterbottom

=== Recurring ===
- Lauren Vélez as Soraya Hargrove
- Corbin Reid as Meggy Travers
- Behzad Dabu as Simon Drake
- Milauna Jackson as Renee Atwood
- Matthew Risch as Thomas
- L. Scott Caldwell as Jasmine
- Benito Martinez as Todd Denver
- Dameon Clarke as John Mumford
- Gloria Garayua as Davis

=== Guest ===
- Tom Verica as Sam Keating
- Famke Janssen as Eve Rothlo
- Esai Morales as Jorge Castillo
- Amy Madigan as Irene Crawley
- Emily Swallow as Lisa Cameron
- Brett Butler as Trishelle Pratt
- Wilson Bethel as Charles Mahoney
- Roxanne Hart as Sylvia Mahoney
- Mark L. Taylor as Vince Levin
- Mary J. Blige as Ro
- Cicely Tyson as Ophelia Harkness
- Roger Robinson as Mac Harkness
- Brian Tyree Henry as Frank's public defender
- Yolonda Ross as Claudia
- Kelsey Scott as Rose Edmond
- Issac Ryan Brown as Christophe Edmond
- Nicholas Gonzalez as Dominic

== Episodes ==
| No. overall | No. in season | Title | Directed by | Written by | Original release date | U.S. viewers (millions) |
|---|---|---|---|---|---|---|
| 31 | 1 | "We're Good People Now" | Bill D'Elia | Peter Nowalk | September 22, 2016 | 5.11 |
The students start their second year of law school and attend a class where Annalise is teaching a pro bono law clinic. The Keating Five struggle with their academic reputations after receiving low first-year grades and, at the same time, worry about an unknown person who is targeting Annalise with a series of flyers labeling her a killer. For a pro bono deportation case, Wes is given first chair until Michaela finds evidence that could win the case. Ultimately, however, they lose the case. Oliver secures a job with Annalise after revealing he deleted Connor's Stanford acceptance letter and has the ability to hack her. After Connor reacts understandingly, Oliver sees his lack of justified anger as a sign that they have an unhealthy relationship and breaks up with him. Annalise has hired an investigator to track down Frank, but Frank overpowers and kills him instead. Flashback: During the summer, the students cope with what they have been going through. Immediately after his father's murder, Wes is picked up by Annalise, who tells him that Frank set them up. In May, Laurel gets into an argument with Annalise and they both agree to cut Frank out of their lives. In June, Asher asks Annalise for a loan after going broke. In July, Connor asks Annalise not to hire Oliver for fear of the latter's safety. In August, a depressed Michaela is saved from getting a DUI by Annalise. Flashforward: Two months later, Annalise returns home to find her house on fire and someone being wheeled away in a body bag. She is left devastated after the coroners let her see who is dead.
| 32 | 2 | "There Are Worse Things Than Murder" | Zetna Fuentes | Angela Robinson | September 29, 2016 | 4.33 |
Frank stages a fiery car accident to hide the body of Annalise's investigator, while Annalise destroys her burner phone so that he cannot contact her. The clinic takes the case of Irene Crawley, a woman who has spent 32 years in jail for murdering her abusive husband and is applying for parole for the seventh time. Connor and Oliver deal with the deterioration of their relationship as Oliver begins working for Annalise. Asher struggles with the revelation that Michaela is just using him for sex, while the university attempts to suspend Annalise from teaching as the flyers begin to make national news. Laurel discovers that Annalise has asked Eve to keep an eye on the Mahoney murder investigation, and drunkenly admits to Bonnie that she loved Frank even though he was a murderer. Flashforward: Annalise is questioned by the police and lashes out at them. Later, she is met by a hysterical Oliver and slips him her phone, telling him to wipe it clean before she is arrested.
| 33 | 3 | "Always Bet Black" | Stephen Cragg | Joe Fazzio | October 6, 2016 | 4.40 |
Annalise's clinic takes the case of a sexual offender/murderer, seemingly restoring her reputation in the process. Laurel visits her estranged father in Miami to seek his help in pinpointing Frank's location; later, she receives a call from Frank and, after returning to Middleton, lies to Annalise and Bonnie about getting her father's help. Connor and Oliver's relationship is tested. Flashforward: Oliver rushes to Annalise's clinic to wipe her phone clean. Due to Annalise's instructions, Bonnie visits the scene to make sure Oliver has done so; he then plants it to make it look like Annalise dropped it by the ambulance. Soon after, emergency crews find a survivor inside the house.
| 34 | 4 | "Don't Tell Annalise" | Kevin Rodney Sullivan | Erika Green Swafford | October 13, 2016 | 4.00 |
Annalise's clinic represents a teenage boy named Tristan accused of credit card theft. At the start of the trial, Annalise learns that her license was suspended after a university board member, Barry Lewinston, sent a video of her slapping her last client to the bar association's disciplinary panel. She agrees to a rehab program for her alcoholism in exchange for getting her license back. After breaking up with Annalise over a vicious fight, Nate sleeps with ADA Renee Atwood. In Coalport, Pennsylvania, Frank kills Bonnie's father at the prison in which he was serving time, avenging her mistreatment as a child. Listed as his next of kin, Bonnie informs Annalise of his death and warns Laurel not to tell Annalise that she lied about not knowing Frank's whereabouts. Flashforward: Bonnie visits Annalise in jail and tells her that someone else was found in the house. Later, Bonnie and Oliver spot Wes's former girlfriend Meggy at the hospital, who rushes to inform a doctor that the survivor is pregnant and is shocked to find out that said survivor is Laurel.
| 35 | 5 | "It's About Frank" | Jann Turner | J. C. Lee | October 20, 2016 | 4.29 |
Annalise attends only one AA meeting, where she finds the university president, Soraya Hargrove, who is also a recovering alcoholic. After suddenly reminiscing over her memories of Sam, Annalise starts drinking again. She later discovers that one of her students, Simon Drake, is the one behind the flyers. She threatens Hargrove with a lawsuit for neglecting the flyers (among various other charges), strong-arming her into reinstating her teaching position. Bonnie heads to Coalport to have her father's corpse cremated and thank Frank for killing him. Frank wants Bonnie to join him in his escape and they later have sex. The next morning, Bonnie finds Frank gone and cries. Wes tells Laurel that he is considering breaking up with Meggy upon realizing that the group is too complicated for him to involve her. Laurel later confronts Annalise about Frank just as Bonnie walks in. Flashback: The Keating couple first encounters Frank, who was serving an unspecified sentence for attempting to kill his father when he was 13 years old. Flashforward: Still in the hospital as Laurel's condition is critical, Bonnie receives a call from someone. A panicked Oliver tries to reach Connor, whose phone is somehow in Michaela's house and is picked up by her foster mother Trishelle. At the same time, the news reveals that the dead body is a male.
| 36 | 6 | "Is Someone Really Dead?" | Sharat Raju | Fernanda Coppel | October 27, 2016 | 4.07 |
As the Keating Five defend an Army veteran accused of attempted murder, the NYPD come looking for Wes to question him on the murder of his father, Wallace Mahoney. Michaela and Asher confirm their commitment to each other and sleep together. Oliver meets someone new. Wes breaks up with Meggy and later sleeps with Laurel. Frank frames Wallace Mahoney's other son, Charles, and makes his way back to Philadelphia. Flashforward: A hysterical Michaela desperately searches for Asher, finding him drunk and dancing with the undergrads in his dorm. She tells him that Annalise's house has burned down and that someone is dead.
| 37 | 7 | "Call It Mother's Intuition" | Mike Smith | Erika Harrison | November 3, 2016 | 4.08 |
The clinic defends three siblings charged with the attempted murder of their mother. Although she portrays an elderly woman, frail and sick, things are not always what they seem. Wes lies to the NYPD after believing that Eve is still on the case. Oliver is turned down by his date Thomas after revealing that he is HIV positive and returns to Connor for comfort; they reconcile by sleeping together. Frank returns to Philadelphia to see Laurel and Bonnie. Bonnie, furious that he both left her in Coalport and went to go see Laurel first, throws him out after a vicious exchange of words. Flashforward: Annalise is formally charged with arson and first degree murder. When she asks about the evidence, the police explain that they have an anonymous source. Laurel awakens from her coma and writes Wes' name on a piece of paper given to her by Meggy. Wes is shown exchanging testimony and evidence for blanket immunity.
| 38 | 8 | "No More Blood" | Jet Wilkinson | Morenike Balogun | November 10, 2016 | 4.32 |
Annalise threatens to kill Frank if he approaches her house, but, as Wes is subpoenaed by Charles Mahoney's lawyer to give testimony, she instead asks Frank to find Charles' alibi. Frank finds out that the Mahoneys' employee who gave him the suitcase of money ten years ago is the alibi. To clear Wes of the charge, Annalise decides to frame said employee (who claims herself to be Charles' one-night stand once, and that she met him on the day of his (and Wes') father's murder and before he was arrested) with Nate's help. In the meantime, Annalise and Hargrove discuss the latter's child custody battle with her husband due to her history of alcoholism. Later, Connor and Oliver fight again after spending time together, culminating in the latter's opinion that Connor has emotional damage. Frank visits Annalise; trying to atone for the pain he caused Annalise, he prepares to shoot himself in the head, which Bonnie objects to, and Annalise encourages, resulting in a heated argument. Flashforward: In jail, Annalise asks Bonnie if she is the anonymous source, which the latter denies, reassuring Annalise she will find the source. Later, at the hospital, Asher, Michaela and Oliver confront Bonnie, with Oliver still being worried about Connor (who is having sex with Thomas elsewhere).
| 39 | 9 | "Who's Dead?" | Bill D'Elia | Michael Foley | November 17, 2016 | 4.95 |
Bonnie convinces Frank to spare himself for her sake, revealing their love affair to Annalise, and encouraging him to turn himself in to the DA's office to save the others from arrest. The Keating Five prepare for their midterm exams. Annalise learns that she's under investigation by the DA's office, causing her to relapse into drinking. She burns all the files for Sam and Rebecca's cases and, in her drunken stupor, leaves for Bonnie's but fails to properly close the front door. Wes is called in for questioning, where he learns that Rebecca's corpse has been discovered in the woods. He is offered immunity to testify against Annalise. Nate, realizing that Atwood only hired him to gain intel on Annalise, ends his relationship with her. A drunken Connor admits to Oliver that he lied about being a drug addict, unintentionally making him suspicious about the night Sam died. Annalise calls the Keating Five to come to her home (before meeting with Oliver to ask him a favor), but as the others are occupied, Laurel goes to Annalise's alone. Nate and Laurel arrive separately before the house suddenly goes up in flames. Annalise is arrested and Laurel is hospitalized. Bonnie takes a call from Frank at the hospital, where she's confronted by Connor, Michaela, Asher, and Oliver. Nate, safe and sound, arrives at the morgue to identify the male under the sheet: a half-burned Wes. He visits Annalise in her holding cell, revealing to her that Wes was already dead before the fire started. Flashback: Wes receives Annalise's voicemail in the police interrogation room, prompting him to sneak out of the police station.
| 40 | 10 | "We're Bad People" | Jennifer Getzinger | Sarah L. Thompson | January 26, 2017 | 5.41 |
After discovering that the body is Wes's, Laurel suffers from post-traumatic stress disorder and is admitted to the hospital. For the first investigation report, she tells the police that she heard something in the basement, but before she could determine what, the house exploded. While visiting Laurel, Connor insults Wes—even advising Laurel to get an abortion for her child—and is severely beaten by an enraged Asher. Annalise and Bonnie discover that the anonymous source that was ready to testify against Annalise was likely Hannah Keating, someone with ample motive to destroy Annalise. In the trial, Annalise is denied bail when the prosecutor reveals the unsigned testimony of Wes. Flashback: The remaining Keating Four are shown with Wes during happier times, reaffirming his connection to everyone. Flashback: After sneaking out of the police station, Wes meets Frank and goes somewhere with him in a car.
| 41 | 11 | "Not Everything's About Annalise" | Nicole Rubio | Abby Ajayi | February 2, 2017 | 4.69 |
After Annalise is denied bail and police look into the investigation from the perspective of street cameras that show Frank with Wes in a car, they affirm the possibility of Frank killing Wes. Laurel is visited by Nate, who informs her that Frank confessed to murdering Wes over the love triangle between the three and because he knew that she was pregnant with Wes's child, which makes her realize that Frank lied to the police, since Laurel herself did not know she was pregnant at the time. She tells the police that she saw Frank at the house and that he must have killed Wes. Frank is later indicted of Wes' murder, giving Annalise a hope for acquittal. However, the police decide to continue investigating Annalise with Frank as her co-conspirator. No deal is signed with the prosecutor, forcing a hopeless Annalise to stay in prison. Flashback: Wes confronts Frank for killing his father. After they argue about their love for Laurel, where their loyalties lie with Annalise, and whether Frank killed Rebecca, Wes decides to walk back to the police station. Frank then calls Bonnie, who tells him not to lose sight of Wes and to start following him.
| 42 | 12 | "Go Cry Somewhere Else" | Cherie Nowlan | Daniel Robinson | February 9, 2017 | 4.92 |
Annalise has another hearing in which Bonnie attempts, unsuccessfully, to argue that Annalise's trial should be severed from Frank's. Annalise is embarrassed to find that her parents have come to the trial after finding out she was in jail. The Keating 4 are unable to attend the hearing because of Wes' memorial. Michaela picks up a now discharged Laurel from the hospital and takes her to the memorial, where Laurel breaks down and berates the other attendees for their insincere grief. Afterwards, Laurel visits the morgue and demands to see Wes' body, enlisting Nate's help to secure a viewing, but discovers that Wes' body has been misplaced by the morgue. In prison, Annalise confronts her parents and discovers that her mother is suffering from dementia. She thinks that her daughter is taking the blame for her regarding the house fire she set that killed Annalise's abusive uncle, leading to a private confrontation between Annalise and her father about his neglect during that situation. Resolved to get out and help her mother, Annalise provokes a fight with an inmate to provide fodder for an abuse claim. Nate finds out that his signature is on the papers instructing Wes' body be moved. Flashback: Bonnie demands that Nate find out why the police are questioning Wes, then gets a call from Frank saying he lost Wes' trail. Wes is shown in a cab making a phone call to an unknown person, identifying himself as Christophe and letting them know it is an emergency situation. As he visits Annalise's empty house, Nate comes face to face with Wes.
| 43 | 13 | "It's War" | Hanelle Culpepper | Brendan Kelly | February 16, 2017 | 4.66 |
Nate believes that Atwood is framing him and is remorseful that he saw Wes at Annalise's house the night of the fire and left him there. Laurel hires a private investigator and finds out the Mahoneys knew that Wes was a blood relative. Frank fires his lawyer and represents himself. Annalise finally reveals why the Mahoneys are so dangerous. Oliver goes through the copy of Annalise's phone and learns from Thomas that Connor left hours before the fire, and realizes he was at the house that night. Bonnie and Annalise collude with Frank, and Atwood is forced to turn over her personal communication records from the day in question. It is revealed that Atwood not only moved Wes' body and tried to frame Nate and Annalise for it, but also had his body cremated, making it impossible for a second autopsy to clear Annalise. Flashback: Nate tries to persuade Wes not to help and trust Annalise anymore, but Wes refuses, as she knew his mother and has helped him countless times since his childhood. Nate leaves Wes alone at the house. Later, Connor is shown at Annalise's house performing CPR on Wes.
| 44 | 14 | "He Made a Terrible Mistake" | Jet Wilkinson | Joe Fazzio | February 23, 2017 | 4.92 |
Connor admits to the others that he found Wes' body in the basement, and, while trying to revive him, heard a bone crack. The group learns that Charles Mahoney was released from jail. Nate gives Atwood's WiFi password to Annalise, and Oliver finds that Atwood was called by an unknown number three times—the night Wes died, the day his body was relocated, and the day he was cremated. The group debates whether or not they should call the number. Denver approaches Frank with a plea deal of seven years or else he and Laurel will both be charged with Wes' murder. Connor offers to take the stand and reveal the information about Wes's broken rib so that the autopsy report may be invalidated, but since doing so may incriminate him, Annalise suggests Laurel take the stand instead. However, Denver discredits her testimony with evidence that she once committed perjury (having allegedly fabricated a story that she was kidnapped), though Laurel explains that she recanted her true statement to protect her father. Thus, Bonnie's motion to dismiss Annalise's murder charge is denied. Connor goes to Denver's office to take the immunity deal Denver offered Wes and admit that he was the one who found Wes' body, and realizes that Atwood's mysterious contact is a burner phone belonging to Denver, proving he was involved with the relocation of Wes' body and possibly more. Flashback: The night of the fire, Laurel goes to Annalise's house. She goes to the basement, where she sees someone—Connor—escape through the storm door just as the house blows up from a gas leak. As Connor runs away, a man in a car tells someone on the phone that "it got kind of messy."
| 45 | 15 | "Wes" | Bill D'Elia | Peter Nowalk | February 23, 2017 | 4.92 |
Just as Connor finds Denver's burner phone, Denver walks in. Wes' unknown killer gives Wes' phone to Denver, who can now claim that it was found in Connor's car. Denver threatens Connor to get him to sign the immunity deal or else he'll be charged with murder. The immunity deal eventually expires but, to save himself from being arrested, Connor discloses that Oliver has a copy of Annalise's phone on his computer. Elsewhere, Annalise confronts Sylvia Mahoney about her family's involvement in Wes' death. Sylvia admits that Wes was not Wallace's son; rather, he was Charles'. Despite Laurel's protests, Annalise pins Rebecca and Sam's deaths on Wes, using a voicemail found on Oliver's computer that she received the night of the fire that incriminates Wes, prompting Denver to drop his charges against her and Frank. Laurel, certain that Charles killed Wes, prepares to kill him, when she is intercepted by the man who is revealed to have been Wes' killer: Dominic, a family friend. Flashback: After Nate leaves Annalise's house, Wes calls Annalise to tell her about the plea deal he was offered. He proposes that he confess to Rebecca and Sam's deaths to protect everybody, when Dominic attacks him and incapacitates him with an injection. Dominic chokes Wes to death after a failed attempt to flee and places his body in the basement before setting the house on fire. The phone call Dominic made about things "getting messy" was not to Denver; it was to Laurel's father, who had Dominic kill Wes.

== Production ==
=== Development ===
ABC renewed the series for a third season on March 3, 2016, along with several other shows. It was announced that the third season would premiere on September 22, 2016. Production began on May 27, 2016, when showrunner Peter Nowalk announced, on Twitter, that the writing staff was in full swing mapping out the third season. The table read for the premiere happened on July 6, 2016, and filming started a week later. A promotional poster showcasing Viola Davis as Annalise Keating was released on August 9, 2016. ABC released a promo for the third season on August 29, 2016.

The season began airing on September 22, 2016 and aired nine episodes in the fall, just like the rest of ABC's primetime Thursday lineup, Grey's Anatomy and Notorious. The remaining fall schedule for ABC was announced on October 22, 2016: How to Get Away with Murder would air nine episodes in the fall with the fall finale to air on November 17, 2016, just like the rest of ABC's primetime lineup, which was the same last year. The remaining six episodes would air after the winter break, on January 26, 2017.

=== Writing ===
In an interview with Entertainment Weekly, showrunner Peter Nowalk talked about what would happen in the third season regarding Frank's disappearance and commented: "Yes, I can see the three-piece suits and the hair product all falling apart. It’s more what Frank feels about himself". When talking about the trust between Annalise and Frank, Nowalk said: "...Frank has two choices: To run away and hope she never catches him, just to cut bait; or he can try to win his way back. That’s a long road." Charlie Weber commented on Frank's whereabouts to Entertainment Weekly: "I think he’s hiding, and I think he’s alone. If he does have a lifeline, I don’t think it’s Laurel."

Nowalk said Laurel's backstory with her family would be explored in the upcoming season, "I feel like it’s very present. The promise of our show is that we won’t dangle things out too long. The likelihood is yes. We’ve raised that question too many times not to answer it sooner than later." Michaela's backstory will also be explored; Nowalk said: "We have so much to explore with her. Aja is so talented. I’m just excited to really delve into her personal life next year." Norwalk told The Hollywood Reporter the show would explore Annalise and Nate's relationship, as well as both their families.

=== Casting ===
The third season will have ten roles receiving star billing, with all of them returning from the previous season. Viola Davis will play the protagonist of the series, Professor Annalise Keating, a high-profile defense attorney, teaching a class at Middleton University. Billy Brown will play Detective Nate Lahey, Annalise's boyfriend. There are five students who work at Annalise's law firm. Alfred Enoch would portray Wes Gibbins, Jack Falahee will portray Connor Walsh, the ruthless student. Aja Naomi King will play Michaela Pratt, the ambitious student who wants to be as successful as Annalise. Matt McGorry will continue portraying Asher Millstone, a student who comes from a privileged background. Karla Souza will play Laurel Castillo, an idealistic student. Charlie Weber will portray Frank Delfino, an employee of Annalise's firm who is not a lawyer but handles special duties requiring discretion. Liza Weil will play Bonnie Winterbottom, who is an associate attorney in Annalise's firm. Conrad Ricamora will portray Oliver Hampton, a hacker who is in a relationship with Connor.

After the second-season finale, it was confirmed that every series regular was expected to return for the third season. TVLine announced on March 18, 2016, that Conrad Ricamora playing Oliver Hampton had been upgraded to a series-regular for the third season. On July 20, 2016, it was announced that Dexter-alum Lauren Vélez had been cast in a recurring role as the President of Middleton University. The role was described as “self-assured, friendly, warm and diplomatic.” It was reported on August 6, 2016, that Esai Morales and Amy Madigan had been added to the show as guest stars for the third season. It was later revealed that Morales would be replacing José Zúniga as Jorge Castillo, Laurel's father. Deadline announced on August 31, 2016, that Mary J. Blige had landed a guest role in the third season. On September 13, 2016, it was reported that Brett Butler will appear in a guest role during the third season.

== Reception ==
=== Critical response ===
The third season received positive reviews from critics. The season has a rating of 90% fresh on Rotten Tomatoes based on 30 reviews. The season premiere was watched by 5.11 million in total viewership, a decline of 39 percent compared to the second-season premiere, and a 1.4 in the key demographic Adults 18–49, a decline of 46 percent from the previous premiere.

=== Ratings ===
Viewership and ratings per episode of How to Get Away with Murder season 3
| No. | Title | Air date | Rating/share (18–49) | Viewers (millions) | DVR (18–49) | DVR viewers (millions) | Total (18–49) | Total viewers (millions) |
|---|---|---|---|---|---|---|---|---|
| 1 | "We're Good People Now" | September 22, 2016 | 1.4/5 | 5.11 | 1.5 | 3.73 | 2.9 | 8.86 |
| 2 | "There Are Worse Things Than Murder" | September 29, 2016 | 1.3/5 | 4.33 | 1.2 | 3.33 | 2.5 | 7.66 |
| 3 | "Always Bet Black" | October 6, 2016 | 1.2/4 | 4.40 | 1.5 | 3.57 | 2.7 | 7.98 |
| 4 | "Don't Tell Annalise" | October 13, 2016 | 1.1/4 | 4.00 | 1.3 | 3.36 | 2.4 | 7.37 |
| 5 | "It's About Frank" | October 20, 2016 | 1.2/4 | 4.29 | 1.3 | 3.41 | 2.5 | 7.70 |
| 6 | "Is Someone Really Dead?" | October 27, 2016 | 1.2/4 | 4.07 | 1.4 | 3.55 | 2.6 | 7.63 |
| 7 | "Call It Mother's Intuition" | November 3, 2016 | 1.2/4 | 4.08 | 1.2 | 3.29 | 2.4 | 7.38 |
| 8 | "No More Blood" | November 10, 2016 | 1.2/4 | 4.32 | 1.3 | 3.14 | 2.5 | 7.43 |
| 9 | "Who's Dead?" | November 17, 2016 | 1.4/5 | 4.95 | 1.3 | 3.29 | 2.7 | 8.25 |
| 10 | "We're Bad People" | January 26, 2017 | 1.5/5 | 5.41 | 1.4 | 3.32 | 2.9 | 8.74 |
| 11 | "Not Everything's About Annalise" | February 2, 2017 | 1.3/5 | 4.69 | 1.2 | 3.11 | 2.5 | 7.81 |
| 12 | "Go Cry Somewhere Else" | February 9, 2017 | 1.3/5 | 4.92 | 1.3 | 3.15 | 2.6 | 8.08 |
| 13 | "It's War" | February 16, 2017 | 1.3/5 | 4.66 | 1.2 | 3.08 | 2.5 | 7.74 |
| 14 | "He Made a Terrible Mistake" | February 23, 2017 | 1.4/5 | 4.92 | 1.4 | 3.06 | 2.7 | 7.99 |
| 15 | "Wes" | February 23, 2017 | 1.4/5 | 4.92 | 1.4 | 3.06 | 2.7 | 7.99 |
