= How to Get Away with Murder season 1 =

How to Get Away with Murder
- Season 1
- Promotional poster and home media cover art
- Starring: Viola Davis; Billy Brown; Alfred Enoch; Jack Falahee; Katie Findlay; Aja Naomi King; Matt McGorry; Karla Souza; Charlie Weber; Liza Weil
- No. of episodes: 15

Release
- Original network: ABC
- Original release: September 25, 2014 – February 26, 2015

Season chronology
- Next → Season 2

The first season of the ABC American television drama series How to Get Away with Murder premiered on September 25, 2014, and concluded on February 26, 2015, with a total of 15 episodes. On May 7, 2015, the show was renewed by ABC for a second season.

For its first season, the series received numerous accolades. The show was honored as a Television Program of the Year by the American Film Institute. It was also named Outstanding Drama Series at the Image Awards and the GLAAD Awards. For her performance, Davis won the Emmy Award for Outstanding Lead Actress in a Drama Series, the Screen Actors Guild Award for Outstanding Performance in a Drama Series, and the Image Award for Outstanding Actress in a Drama Series. Davis received nominations from the Golden Globe Awards for Best Actress in a Television Series, the Critics' Choice Awards for Best Actress in a Drama Series, and the Television Critics Association for Individual Achievement in Drama.

== Cast and characters ==
=== Main ===
- Viola Davis as Annalise Keating
- Billy Brown as Nate Lahey
- Alfred Enoch as Wes Gibbins
- Jack Falahee as Connor Walsh
- Katie Findlay as Rebecca Sutter
- Aja Naomi King as Michaela Pratt
- Matt McGorry as Asher Millstone
- Karla Souza as Laurel Castillo
- Charlie Weber as Frank Delfino
- Liza Weil as Bonnie Winterbottom

=== Recurring ===
- Tom Verica as Sam Keating
- Megan West as Lila Stangard
- Conrad Ricamora as Oliver Hampton
- Alysia Reiner as Wendy Parks
- Lenny Platt as Griffin O'Reilly
- Lynn Whitfield as Mary Walker
- Arjun Gupta as Kan
- April Parker Jones as Claire Bryce
- Marcia Gay Harden as Hannah Keating
- Tamlyn Tomita as Carol Morrow

=== Guest ===
- Steven Weber as Max St. Vincent
- Ana Ortiz as Paula Murphy
- Elliot Knight as Aiden Walker
- Elizabeth Perkins as Marren Trudeau
- John Posey as William Millstone
- Cicely Tyson as Ophelia Harkness
- Michelle Hurd as Amanda Winthrop
- Tom Everett Scott as Andrew Crawford
- Sarah Burns as Emily Sinclair
- Jason Gedrick as Gabriel Shaw

== Episodes ==
No. overall	No. in season	Title	Directed by	Written by	Original release date	U.S. viewers (millions)
1	1	"Pilot"	Michael Offer	Peter Nowalk	September 25, 2014	14.12
A defense attorney and Criminal Law professor, Annalise Keating, selects five of her students to work at her firm. Annalise's client is a woman accused of the attempted murder of her lover, her boss, with aspirin, to which he is highly allergic. Wes finds out that Annalise is cheating on her husband Sam, while Connor finds interesting ways to help with the case. The body of a student who had been missing for months, Lila Stangard, is found in the water tank of her sorority by a repairman. As Annalise and Sam view the ensuing news report together, Annalise remarks, "I bet you the boyfriend did it." Flashforward: Wes, Connor, Michaela and Laurel argue about how to get rid of a body that is in Annalise's house, almost getting caught by police. They later go into the woods and, after flipping a coin, decide that the best thing to do is to burn the body, which is revealed to be Sam's.
2	2	"It's All Her Fault"	Bill D'Elia	Peter Nowalk	October 2, 2014	11.94
Annalise takes on the case of a millionaire (Steven Weber) who is accused of murdering his wife. Connor tries to make things right with his hacker boyfriend Oliver after skipping dinner to work on the case. Annalise's trial is thrown for a loop when the daughter of the accused reveals to the prosecution that her father had murdered her mother in the same way he has been accused of killing his second wife. Annalise begins to grow suspicious of Sam and his involvement with Lila. Laurel goes to Bonnie looking for advice about Frank. Flashforward: While buying supplies to clean up after Sam's murder, Wes calls and tells someone that everything is okay. He later goes to a motel room, where he meets with his next-door neighbor Rebecca and they kiss.
3	3	"Smile, or Go to Jail"	Randy Zisk	Rob Fresco	October 9, 2014	10.81
Annalise takes on the case of soccer mom Paula Murphy (Ana Ortiz), who was originally caught having sex with a man in a park but is soon put on trial for murder. Wes tries to help Rebecca, who is now taking the fall for Lila's murder. Michaela finds out that her fiancé had a relationship with Connor years ago in boarding school. Nate looks into Sam's alibi the night of Lila's murder and finds that he does not have one, but confirms to Annalise that Sam's alibi is airtight. Annalise's case is put on hold after her client runs away with her former lover, a convicted felon. Flashforward: Wes, Connor, Michaela, and Laurel plan on getting rid of the body but find that they need alibis for the night, resulting in them taking photos at a bonfire party. When leaving the woods, Michaela realizes she has lost her engagement ring.
4	4	"Let's Get to Scooping"	Laura Innes	Erika Green Swafford	October 16, 2014	9.79
Annalise takes on the case of an old friend, Marren Trudeau (Elizabeth Perkins), who is being accused of fraud and is insisting that she is innocent and being framed. Wes gets himself kicked off Rebecca's case after it is found that he is to blame for her confessing to murdering Lila. Connor hooks up with another man to help the case but realizes he has genuine feelings for Oliver, who kicks Connor out after learning about his hook-up. Frank faces jealousy issues with Laurel. Bonnie has to find ways to get Rebecca's confession thrown out. Wes convinces Rebecca that the others need to know what is on Lila's cell phone, resulting in Rebecca beginning to finally trust him. A photo of Sam Keating's penis is found on the phone. Flashforward: After Sam is murdered, Michaela begins freaking out and Asher shows up at the crime scene, angry over losing the trophy (a statue of Lady Justice). Connor goes to Oliver's house after they get rid of the body, freaking out with the realization of what he and the others had just done.
5	5	"We're Not Friends"	Mike Listo	Tracey A. Bellomo	October 23, 2014	9.97
Annalise takes on the case of a teenager who is being charged with the murder of his abusive father, while Wes questions her on when she's going to give Lila's phone to the police. Annalise finds out about how Bonnie got Rebecca's confession, and Laurel jeopardizes her career and risks going to jail when she tries to help with the case by informing the jury. Annalise confronts Sam about his relationship with Lila. Rebecca is brought in for a "routine psych evaluation" to determine if she knew who Lila was having an affair with, but she runs out after finding that the wallpaper in Sam and Annalise's room is the same as in the picture. Laurel and Frank go head to head with each other as they fight their feelings, while Bonnie doesn't know what to do after witnessing the fight between Annalise and Sam. Flashforward: The four students try to figure out how to get the murder weapon—the trophy—back into Annalise's house. Laurel answers a phone call from Frank to strengthen their alibi of being at the bonfire. After Michaela freaks out and cannot do anything else to help them, Laurel decides to go to Frank for help.
6	6	"Freakin' Whack-a-Mole"	Bill D'Elia	Michael Foley	October 30, 2014	8.68
Annalise finds out that she is finally able to retry someone who was put on death row more than twenty years ago, and she is now able to convince the Supreme Court of his innocence. Wes stops coming to class, so Frank tries to find Rebecca in order to get Wes back into the fold. Annalise and the team prepare for their Supreme Court hearing and attempt to figure out how their client was set up. During the trial, Annalise is reprimanded for how her case is built on circumstances, only for her team to argue that the original case was the same, resulting in their client being set free. Frank plants Lila's phone in her boyfriend Griffin's car, resulting in Griffin getting arrested after Nate finds out. Annalise tells Sam about what she's done and tells him the only reason she did it was because she "needs him". Flashforward: Asher notices the trophy is missing from his apartment and goes to confront his colleagues about stealing it only for him to get a call from Bonnie, resulting in them sleeping together. Bonnie gets a call from Annalise, who asks where Sam is and says that something "bad" has happened.
7	7	"He Deserved to Die"	Eric Stoltz	Warren Hsu Leonard	November 6, 2014	9.18
Annalise continues to tackle Rebecca's case for the murder of Lila when they find out that Griffin's lawyers have been leaking things to the tabloids to smear Rebecca, resulting in a gag order. Michaela finds that she has an interview at a law firm, only to discover that it's her future in-laws who have called the meeting for a prenuptial agreement. Griffin's defense team wants to exhume Lila's body in order to show that Rebecca was the one who killed Lila, resulting in the prosecution coming to Annalise for help because they don't want the same thing. However, the prosecutor double-crosses Annalise and Asher hooks up with someone on the prosecution's team to obtain information and find out the reason behind the double-cross. Later on, the judge orders Lila's body to be exhumed. Following a brief argument, Wes and Rebecca give in to their mutual feelings and sleep together. After the examination, their case for Rebecca is bolstered by the fact that the marks on Lila's neck are from ant bites, but more problems for the case (and Sam) come to light when it is discovered that Lila was six weeks pregnant when she died. Flashforward: Wes cleans Rebecca up after Sam's murder, resulting in her wanting to take the fall for it, arguing that since she's already on trial for Lila's murder, she's going to jail regardless.
8	8	"He Has a Wife"	Debbie Allen	Doug Stockstill	November 13, 2014	9.25
Annalise takes on the case of a professional woman and mother who apparently murdered her children's nanny whilst sleepwalking under the influence of her sleeping pills. Michaela meets with her future mother-in-law to discuss the prenup she is refusing to sign. Laurel, getting closer with Frank, discovers he has a girlfriend. Bonnie confesses to Annalise that Sam knew Lila was pregnant, after he comes onto her and tries to convince her to keep it a secret. Wes tells Rebecca that the man she is helping is Annalise's lover, which leads to a huge fight. Rebecca sneaks off to get incriminating evidence about Sam herself, leading into the events of the present scenes. Flashback: Rebecca and Lila meet on the sorority house roof secretly, where Lila reveals she is not only sleeping with Sam (whom she refers to as Mr. Darcy), but also shows her the pictures on her phone. On the night of her murder, an upset Lila goes to Annalise's house to attempt to reveal the truth about the affair, but is turned away by Bonnie.
9	9	"Kill Me, Kill Me, Kill Me"	Stephen Williams	Michael Foley & Erika Green Swafford	November 20, 2014	9.82
Rebecca sneaks into the Keating house to steal the information on Sam's laptop that would supposedly exonerate her. Michaela arrives to return the trophy she stole from Asher and is greeted by Sam, drunk after viciously fighting with Annalise in light of his involvement in Lila's murder. Sam discovers Rebecca and chases her upstairs, where they struggle. Trying to free Rebecca, Michaela pushes Sam over the banister and onto the floor below. Sam is presumed dead, and Rebecca, Wes, Connor, Michaela and Laurel ponder their next move, but Sam leaps up and attacks Rebecca. Wes strikes Sam on the head with the trophy, killing him. In the woods, the gang agrees to burn Sam's body. Wes returns to the Keating house to retrieve the trophy in an attempt to hide the murder weapon. After having fought with Sam, Annalise goes to Nate's in a panic. The two have sex, after which Annalise departs, later leaving Sam a heartfelt voicemail message. The students burn Sam's body in a bonfire, chop up the remains, dispose of them in a dumpster, and leave. A final flashback reveals that when Wes went back to retrieve the trophy, Annalise was sitting at her desk all along, thus showing her complicity in her husband's murder.
10	10	"Hello Raskolnikov"	Michael Offer	Marcus Dalzine	January 29, 2015	9.18
Annalise files a Missing Person report on Sam, making it seem like Sam fled as a fugitive for killing Lila. The Keating Four are unsure of what Annalise knows about their involvement in Sam's murder or her intentions to help them avoid getting caught. Annalise is able to persuade the court that Rebecca had nothing to do with Lila's death, and shifts the blame on Sam. Rebecca is acquitted of all charges. Connor and Michaela contemplate turning themselves in and blaming Sam's murder on Wes. They bargain with Laurel to go along with the plan, threatening to sell her out too; Laurel instead tells Wes and Annalise. In turn, Annalise explains that turning themselves in will only make things worse. She vows to always protect them and tells them that they need to trust her. Annalise tells Frank what really happened to Sam. Connor calls Annalise to let her know that Sam's sister, Hannah, a psychologist, is in town and refuses to believe that Sam killed Lila.
11	11	"Best Christmas Ever"	Michael Katleman	Tracy A. Bellomo & Warren Hsu Leonard	February 5, 2015	8.34
Annalise's sister-in-law arrives in Middleton, looking for answers about Sam's supposed disappearance. Annalise instead focuses on the case of Jackie Wilson, a woman whose husband has sexually abused her and the two young women in their basement. Laurel confides in Frank that she's starting to get nervous about the evidence in Connor's car, so Frank steals and destroys it. It soon comes to light that Jackie stole the child of one of the girls in the basement and is secretly raising it. Annalise then drops the case, leaving Jackie to serve time in jail. Annalise admits to Hannah she lied about Sam's affair. Wes returns home to live news coverage that Sam's remains have been identified in the bin where they were disposed of. Flashback: Over the break, the characters each face emotional issues. Annalise locks herself in a hotel room, drinking a lot. Wes is unable to sleep without having nightmares. Connor wants Oliver back. Michaela's fiancé postpones their wedding, and Laurel is kicked out of her parents' home.
12	12	"She's a Murderer"	Bill D'Elia	Erika Harrison	February 12, 2015	8.44
When Sam's remains are discovered, the police suspect that Annalise is somehow involved in his death, with Hannah immediately accusing her. Frank warns Laurel that she, Wes, Connor and Michaela can no longer contact Annalise, since her phone is being tapped by the police. Hannah tells the judge that Annalise having once threatened to kill Sam is enough for a warrant to be issued to search her home, but no evidence is found. Bonnie confronts Annalise, saying that she knows the Keating Four were the ones who killed Sam and warns Annalise that protecting them could ruin her career. At the end of the episode, the cops interrogate Annalise after finding Sam's ring, which Wes removed from the dead man's finger before burning his body, in the woods. It is revealed that Annalise had Frank break into Nate's house and frame him for the murder by removing his fingerprint from a glass and planting it on the ring, leading to Nate's arrest. The Keating Four are shocked when Nate is charged, but Michaela points out, "She's doing what she said she would do. She's taking care of us." Annalise, lying in her bed and riddled with guilt, calls her mother for help.
13	13	"Mama's Here Now"	Mike Listo	Erika Green Swafford & Doug Stockstill	February 19, 2015	8.86
Annalise's mother Ophelia is in town and questions Annalise about her involvement in Sam's death, her lifestyle, and her childhood. It's revealed that as a child Annalise's uncle raped her, and although initially unknown to Annalise, her mother reveals that she murdered her brother by setting their house on fire with him in it. Meanwhile, the Keating Four and Bonnie take on a case of a female nurse who is being accused of raping her male patient while he was sedated. Bonnie wins the case, as it turns out the defendant did not rape her patient, who was gay and in a relationship with the facility's lawyer. Meanwhile, the Keating Four are curious about Nate's upcoming trial for Sam's murder. Michaela warns Annalise, "You know he's innocent and black," referring to the likelihood of the court making the case a matter of race (with Sam being white). Connor and Oliver enter a relationship again. Bonnie is angry with Frank for lying about knowing what happened to Sam. Annalise passes a note to Nate with a phone number. Wes learns about a witness named Rudy and finds out that Rebecca had him arrested, which leads him to question everything he thought he knew about Rebecca. Wes and Laurel visit Rudy in a psychiatric hospital. He is shown Rebecca's picture and replies, "wet." They realize he's referring to Lila's murder, her body having been dumped in a water tank. The episode ends with Rebecca tracking Wes' location via his phone.
14	14	"The Night Lila Died"	Laura Innes	Michael Foley	February 26, 2015	8.99
Wes and Laurel begin to suspect that Rebecca is the one who murdered Lila. They later tell Connor and Michaela. Annalise takes on a new client, a priest who murdered another priest after the latter was molesting a young boy. The priest flip-flops on his pleas, but when the woman he loves is put on the stand, he decides to plead guilty to first-degree murder instead of manslaughter. Annalise has Frank make some calls to get Nate assaulted in his cell, hoping to get Nate out of jail, but he is instead moved to solitary confinement. Wes and Laurel revisit Rebecca's psychological evaluation and police statements. The episode ends with Rebecca coming home to find Wes, Connor, Michaela and Laurel, who ask her whether she killed Lila. Rebecca refuses to answer and threatens to call the cops on them for killing Sam. They call Annalise and it's revealed that they have bound and gagged Rebecca in the bathroom. Flashback: It's revealed that Rebecca and Lila were arguing on the day Lila was murdered. Lila blames her problems on Rebecca and no longer wants to be her friend. She also wants to get back together with Griffin, but Rebecca objects. Later, Lila catches Griffin and Rebecca together. Lila is about to attack Rebecca until Griffin has to separate the two. Lila screams that she never wants to see Rebecca or Griffin again, with Rebecca smiling in response.
15	15	"It's All My Fault"	Bill D'Elia	Peter Nowalk	February 26, 2015	8.99
A flashback shows that when the interns had confronted Rebecca about killing Lila, Rebecca blackmails them, saying that she found the campus cop who witnessed them carrying Sam's body out of Annalise's house the night of the bonfire. They move Rebecca to Annalise's house and attempt to make a case for Rebecca murdering Lila. Annalise eventually decides that all the evidence they have proving Rebecca killed Lila is circumstantial and therefore unwinnable. While they are working, Rebecca texts "Eggs 911 / Lawyer's house" to an unknown number from Michaela's phone. They move Rebecca to Annalise's basement and tie her up. Wes listens to Rebecca's story of how she found Lila's body, hid inside the water tank when she heard people coming, and drugged Rudy to keep him quiet about seeing her come home soaking wet. He believes her story and that she is innocent. With the evidence against Rebecca being all circumstantial and Wes vouching for her, Annalise decides to free Rebecca and ask her nicely not to tell the police about the campus cop witness. Annalise goes downstairs to speak to Rebecca. Frank and the interns find Annalise outside by a door leading to an empty basement. Annalise states that Rebecca was gone when she came downstairs and demands to know who let her go. As Wes leaves, Annalise returns to the basement where Frank is. She asks him if he "did it", and he in turn does the same, but they both deny it. When Rebecca's body is shown underneath the basement staircase, it is then revealed that they are referring to the fact that Rebecca never left the house and was in fact killed. Flashback: Sam meets with Lila on the roof of the sorority house after she threatens to go public with her pregnancy. Sam consoles Lila and proclaims his love for her, telling her that he hadn't loved Annalise for years and he was going to go tell her. But after leaving, Sam makes a call and tells someone to do what they "talked about". It is then shown it was Frank who strangled Lila. Side stories: Oliver tests positive for HIV and tells Connor, who tested negative. Michaela cuts ties with Aiden's family. Laurel reveals that she found Michaela's lost engagement ring in Connor's car the night of the bonfire, and kept it from Michaela to ensure that Michaela would keep quiet about her involvement that night. Annalise, Wes, Connor, Michaela, Laurel, and Rebecca learn of Asher and Bonnie's tryst. Nate finally calls the phone number Annalise gave him.

== Production ==
=== Development ===
On August 19, 2013, ABC bought the original concept from Shondaland Productions, produced by Shonda Rhimes and Betsy Beers. The script for the pilot episode was written by Grey's Anatomy supervising producer Peter Nowalk. ABC ordered the pilot on December 19, 2013. It was directed by Michael Offer. On May 8, 2014, ABC picked up the pilot to series for the 2014–15 television season. At the Television Critics Association Press Tour in July 2014, it was announced that How to Get Away with Murder would be a limited series with only 15 or 16 episodes per season. The smaller episode count is the result of a deal for series star Viola Davis. On October 9, 2014, ABC picked up the series for a full season of 15 episodes.

=== Filming ===
The pilot episode was filmed in Los Angeles, California, at the University of Southern California, and in Philadelphia, Pennsylvania; in Bryn Mawr, Pennsylvania, at Bryn Mawr College; and in Collegeville, Pennsylvania, at Ursinus College.

=== Casting ===
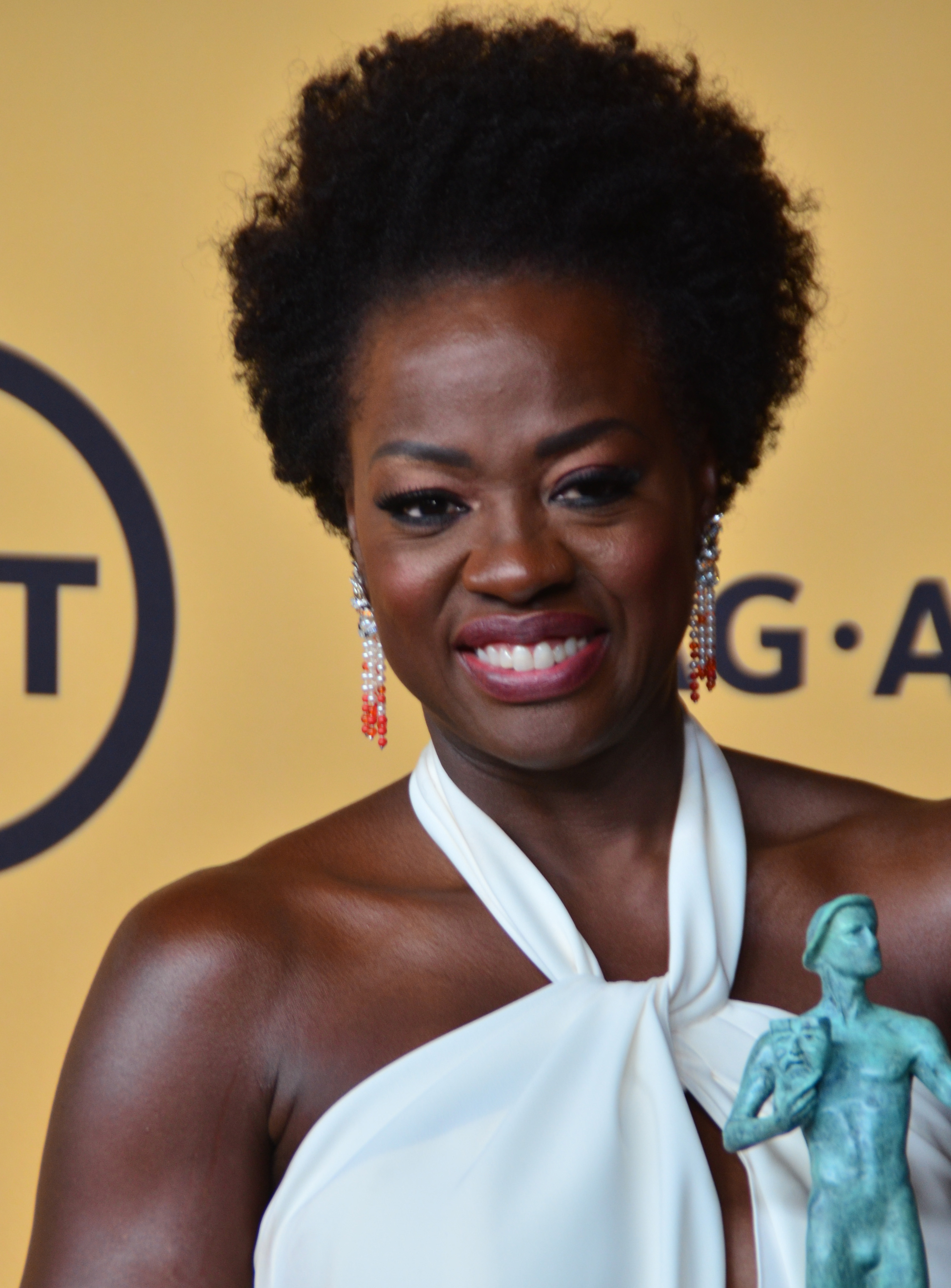
Viola Davis portrays the protagonist of the series, Annalise Keating.

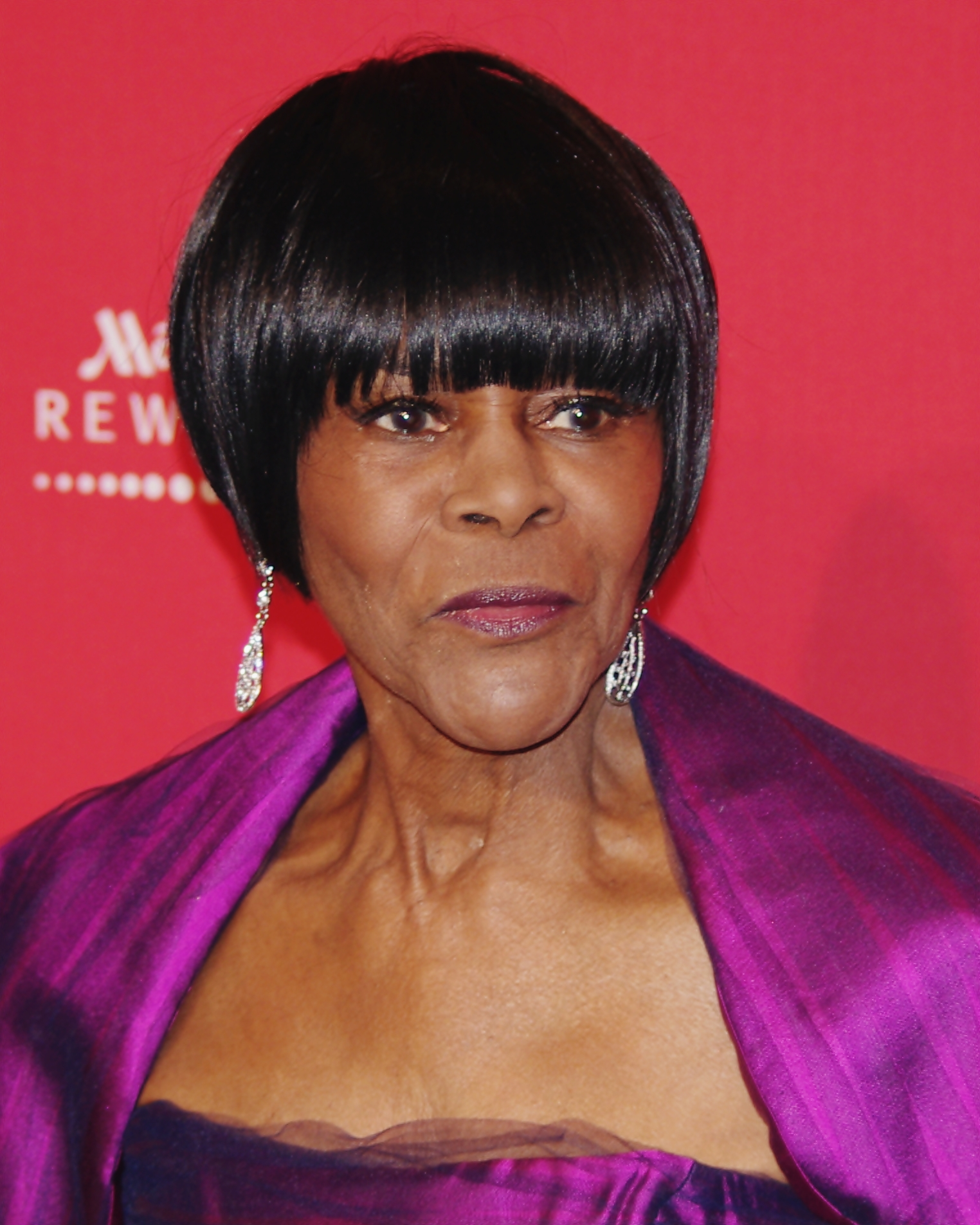
Cicely Tyson plays Annalise's mother, Ophelia Harkness

The first season had ten roles receiving star billing. Viola Davis plays the protagonist of the series, Professor Annalise Keating, a high-profile defense attorney, teaching a class at Middleton University. Billy Brown plays Annalise's lover, Detective Nate Lahey, who tries to prove Sam's involvement in Lila Stangard's murder and becomes the main suspect in Sam's murder. There are five students who work at Annalise's law firm: Wes Gibbins, portrayed by Alfred Enoch, a student recently accepted off the wait list who later has a relationship with Rebecca; Connor Walsh, portrayed by Jack Falahee, a student who is ruthless and viewed as somewhat narcissistic by his peers; Michaela Pratt, portrayed by Aja Naomi King, an ambitious student who wants to become as successful as Annalise; Asher Millstone, portrayed by Matt McGorry, who comes from a privileged background and becomes affectionate towards Bonnie in the latter half of the season; and Laurel Castillo, portrayed by Karla Souza, an idealistic student who later has a relationship with Frank. Katie Findlay portrays Rebecca Sutter, Wes' mysterious neighbor (and later, girlfriend) who becomes a suspect in the murder of Lila Stangard. Charlie Weber plays Frank Delfino, an employee of Annalise's firm who is not a lawyer but handles special duties requiring discretion. Liza Weil plays Bonnie Winterbottom, an associate attorney in Annalise's firm.

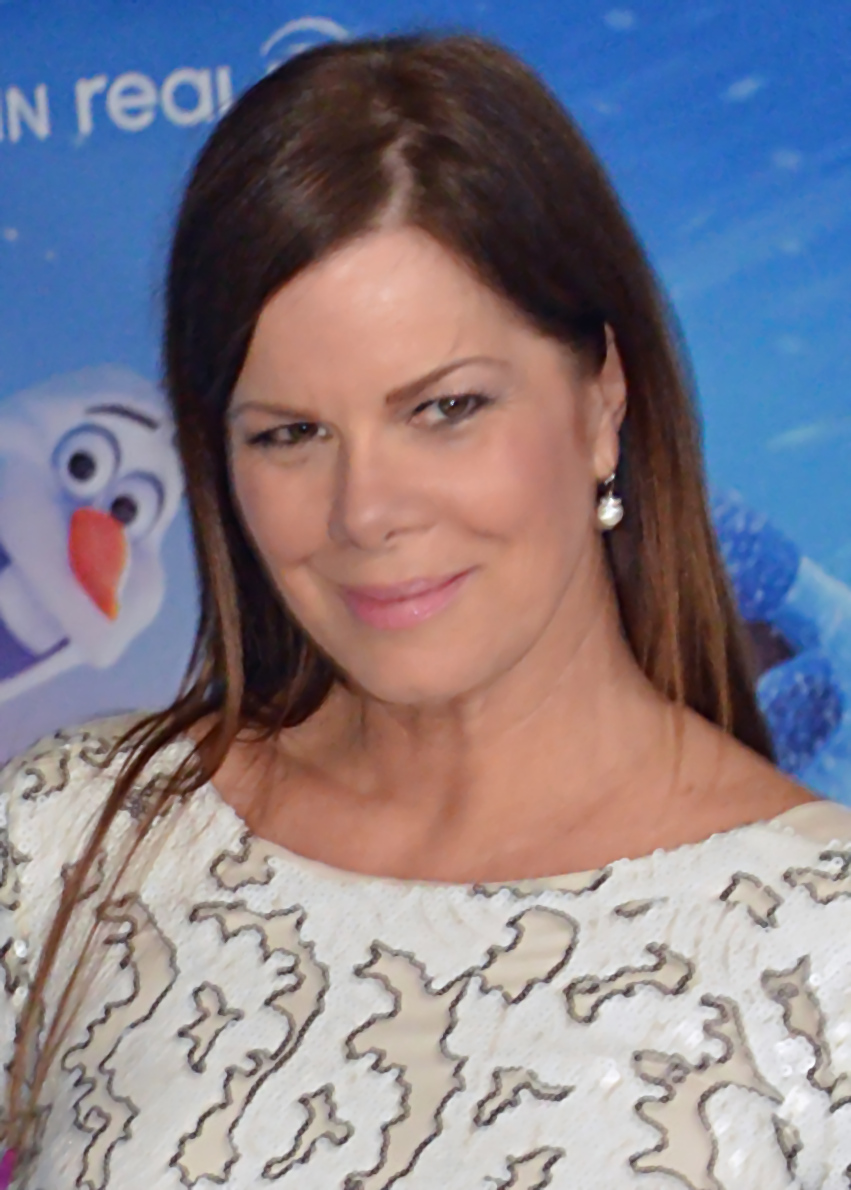
Oscar winner Marcia Gay Harden plays Dr. Hannah Keating

Other recurring roles in the first season were Tom Verica who played Professor Sam Keating, Annalise's husband who had an affair with Lila Stangard and was later murdered by Wes. Megan West portrayed Lila Stangard, a sorority girl who was murdered by Frank on Sam's orders after he found out she was pregnant. Conrad Ricamora played Oliver Hampton, an IT specialist with whom Connor forms a romantic relationship. Alysia Reiner played Wendy Parks, a prosecutor who goes up against Annalise. Lenny Platt portrayed Griffin O'Reilly, a star quarterback and boyfriend of the murdered Lila Stangard. Elliot Knight played Michaela's fiancé, Aiden Walker, and Lynn Whitfield played his mother and Michaela's future mother-in-law, Mary Walker. Marcia Gay Harden played Dr. Hannah Keating, a psychologist and Sam's sister, who becomes suspicious of Annalise after Sam goes missing. Cicely Tyson portrayed Ophelia Harkness, Annalise's mother.

On January 21, 2014, Matt McGorry was the first to be announced as a regular cast member, playing a law student. On February 25, 2014, it was announced that Shonda Rhimes had cast Viola Davis in the show's leading role of Professor Annalise Keating. Throughout February and March 2014, other roles were announced as cast: Aja Naomi King, Jack Falahee, Alfred Enoch and Karla Souza as law students; Katie Findlay as a drug-dealing student; Charlie Weber as a law associate to Professor Keating; Billy Brown as Professor Keating's extramarital love interest; veteran actor and producer Tom Verica as Professor Keating's husband; and Liza Weil as one of the professor's two associates.

On August 11, 2014, it was announced that Orange is the New Black alum Alysia Reiner was cast as a prosecutor who would be going up against Annalise. On November 4, 2014, it was announced that Oscar winner Marcia Gay Harden was cast in the second half of the first season for a secret recurring role. On December 15, 2014, it was announced that Oscar nominee and Emmy winner Cicely Tyson would appear in an episode in the second half of the season.

== Reception ==
=== Critical response ===
The first season of How to Get Away with Murder received positive reviews, with most praising Viola Davis' performance. On Rotten Tomatoes, it has a rating of 85%, based on 57 reviews, with an average rating of 6.9/10. The site's critical consensus reads, "How to Get Away with Murder isn't conceptually original, but it delivers thrills with melodramatic twists and a captivating lead." Metacritic gave season one of the show a score of 68 out of 100, based on 30 critics, indicating "generally favorable" reviews.

Mary McNamara from Los Angeles Times wrote about Viola Davis' performance: "...all eyes are on Davis, Tony winner and Oscar nominee. Magnetic and intimidating, Davis creates an implacable surface beneath which shimmers all manner of fleet and startled emotions. Desire and fear, certainty, self-doubt and resolve are conjured in an instant with the angle of a glance, the lowering of an eyelid and then released as if they were never there." Entertainment Weekly's Melissa Maerz described Davis' performance as "powerfully layered." David Hinckle, from New York Daily News, said that the series does not serve up enough fun unlike Rhimes' other shows, Grey's Anatomy and Scandal. Frazier Moore, Associated Press, wrote that the show "promises to be twisty, wicked, dark and fun. And it stars Viola Davis, who brings life to a character of endless calculations and mystery."

=== Ratings ===
The series premiere had more than 14 million viewers on live broadcast, and over 20 million with DVR. The first episode set a record for DVR playback viewers with 6 million, surpassing the January 27, 2014, record of 5.6 million set by the pilot of The Blacklist.

Viewership and ratings per episode of How to Get Away with Murder season 1
No.	Title	Air date	Rating/share (18–49)	Viewers (millions)	DVR (18–49)	DVR viewers (millions)	Total (18–49)	Total viewers (millions)
1	"Pilot"	September 25, 2014	3.9/12	14.34	2.3	6.95	6.2	21.29
2	"It's All Her Fault"	October 2, 2014	3.2/10	11.94	2.3	5.76	5.5	17.70
3	"Smile, or Go to Jail"	October 9, 2014	3.1/10	10.81	2.3	5.50	5.4	16.31
4	"Let's Get to Scooping"	October 16, 2014	2.8/9	9.79	2.2	5.41	5.0	15.20
5	"We're Not Friends"	October 23, 2014	3.0/9	9.97	1.8	4.28	4.8	14.25
6	"Freakin' Whack-a-Mole"	October 30, 2014	2.7/8	8.68	2.0	5.18	4.7	13.86
7	"He Deserved to Die"	November 6, 2014	2.8/9	9.18	2.2	5.39	5.0	14.57
8	"He Has a Wife"	November 13, 2014	2.9/9	9.25	2.2	5.32	5.1	14.57
9	"Kill Me, Kill Me, Kill Me"	November 20, 2014	3.1/10	9.82	2.0	4.93	5.1	14.76
10	"Hello Raskolnikov"	January 29, 2015	3.1/10	9.18	1.8	4.56	4.9	13.74
11	"Best Christmas Ever"	February 5, 2015	2.7/9	8.34	1.9	4.36	4.6	12.73
12	"She's a Murderer"	February 12, 2015	2.7/9	8.44	1.8	4.33	4.5	12.78
13	"Mama's Here Now"	February 19, 2015	2.9/9	8.86	1.8	4.87	4.7	13.73
14	"The Night Lila Died"	February 26, 2015	2.8/9	8.99	1.7	4.31	4.5	13.32
15	"It's All My Fault"	February 26, 2015	2.8/9	8.99	1.7	4.31	4.5	13.32

=== Accolades ===
Award	Category	Nominee	Result
American Film Institute Award	Television Program of the Year	How to Get Away with Murder	Won
TV Guide Award	Favorite New Show	How to Get Away with Murder	Nominated
People's Choice Award	Favorite New TV Drama	How to Get Away with Murder	Nominated
People's Choice Award	Favorite Actress In A New TV Series	Viola Davis	Won
NAACP Image Award	Outstanding Drama Series	How to Get Away with Murder	Won
NAACP Image Award	Outstanding Actress in a Drama Series	Viola Davis	Won
NAACP Image Award	Outstanding Supporting Actress in a Drama Series	Aja Naomi King	Nominated
NAACP Image Award	Outstanding Supporting Actor in a Drama Series	Alfred Enoch	Nominated
NAACP Image Award	Outstanding Writer for a Drama Series	Erika Green Swafford ("Let's Get to Scooping")	Won
Screen Actors Guild Award	Outstanding Performance by a Female Actor in a Drama Series	Viola Davis	Won
Golden Globe Award	Best Actress in a Television Series – Drama	Viola Davis	Nominated
GLAAD Media Award	Outstanding Drama Series	How to Get Away with Murder	Won
GALECA Award	TV Drama of the Year	How to Get Away with Murder	Nominated
GALECA Award	TV Performance of the Year - Actress	Viola Davis	Nominated
Critics' Choice Award	Best Actress in a Drama Series	Viola Davis	Nominated
Critics' Choice Award	Best Guest Performer in a Drama Series	Cicely Tyson	Nominated
BET Award	Best Actress	Viola Davis	Nominated
TCA Award	Individual Achievement in Drama	Viola Davis	Nominated
Creative Arts Emmy Award	Outstanding Guest Actress in a Drama Series	Cicely Tyson	Nominated
Primetime Emmy Award	Outstanding Lead Actress in a Drama Series	Viola Davis	Won
OFTA Television Award	Best Actress in a Drama Series	Viola Davis	Nominated
Artios Award	Casting, Television Pilot: Drama	Linda Lowy, Diane Heery, Jason Loftus, Jamie Castro	Won

Critics' top ten lists

- No. 9 The Salt Lake Tribune
- No. 1 People Magazine
- No. 9 Us Weekly
- No. 10 Pittsburgh Post-Gazette
- – The Globe and Mail
- – American Film Institute

== DVD release ==
The DVD released was first released in Region 1 on August 4, 2015.

The Complete First Season
Set details		Special features
15 Episodes; English, French and Spanish subtitles		First Year Law: Behind the Scenes; "Bye Felicia" music video; Deleted scenes; Bloopers
Release dates
Region 1	Region 2	Region 4
August 4, 2015	November 16, 2015	November 11, 2015
