= Connor Walsh (character) =

Fictional character in How to Get Away with Murder

- How to Get Away with Murder character
- Jack Falahee in a promotional still of Walsh.
- First appearance: "Pilot" (1.01); September 25, 2014
- Last appearance: "Stay" (6.15); May 14, 2020
- Created by: Peter Nowalk
- Portrayed by: Jack Falahee

In-universe information
- Gender: Male
- Occupation: Law Student
- Family: Jeff Walsh (father); Pam Walsh (mother); Ted Walsh (stepfather); Gemma Walsh (sister)
- Spouse: Oliver Hampton
- Nationality: American
- Status: Alive

Connor Morgan Walsh is a fictional character created in 2014 by Peter Nowalk. He was developed for ABC's legal drama series How to Get Away with Murder. Portrayed by Jack Falahee, he is one of the series' main characters. Walsh is a Philadelphia-based law student, who works as an intern for the law firm of Annalise Keating (Viola Davis) as one of the "Keating Five".

== Casting ==
Walsh is portrayed by actor Jack Falahee, who auditioned for the role on How to Get Away with Murder during the television pilot season (January to February) in 2014. Falahee had initially auditioned through video for the assistant to the casting director of Murder, before auditioning for another pilot series, Agatha. Although the latter series did not proceed, the casting director of Murder had reviewed his audition tape. By February, Falahee joined the series' creator and executive producer, Peter Nowalk, for screen tests in the role of Walsh; the scene was for the pilot episode, whereby the character is at a bar trying to pick up Oliver. Nowalk was full of awe in response to Falahee's audition, adamant that, "[f]rom the minute he opened his mouth, he sounded just like Connor should".

On February 12, 2014, it was announced that Falahee had officially secured the role of Walsh in the series.

== Development ==
=== Characterization ===
"When I first read [the script], I was mostly interested in Connor because he seemed like someone I knew—a guy from school or one of my brother’s colleagues. [Peter Nowalk] crafted this character that's flawed but likable. You want to hate him but he's so charming at the same time. It's so honest."

— Actor Jack Falahee on Connor Walsh's character.

From the outset of Murder, the character is portrayed as sly, sophisticated, confident, and used to getting what he wants. Walsh is openly gay, and has a "rampant" sex life; BuzzFeed explains, that "with a libido as powerful as his mind, [Walsh] has unapologetically used his sexuality to bend men to his will and manipulated everyone blocking his path to career advancement". When being tested for HIV in "It's All My Fault", the clinic nurse asks him how many sexual partners he had during the past year, to which he estimates between 30 and 40.

=== In How to Get Away with Murder ===
In the pilot episode, Walsh is introduced as a law student of Middleton University, a college in Philadelphia. During his first day of law school, Walsh meets Professor Annalise Keating (Viola Davis) in her criminal law class. He meets Oliver at a bar, a computer technician, who he sleeps with in order to obtain the information he needs to gain the admiration of Professor Keating. The intelligence he gains is rewarded with a trophy, and Walsh is selected by Keating to join her team –the Keating Five– despite his questionable methods. In "Let's Get to Scooping", Walsh has sex with Paxton Curtis, someone he suspects is behind insider trading at the brokerage firm of Keating's client, Marren Trudeau (Elizabeth Perkins). His suspicions are correct, and after he reveals this to Keating and Trudeau, Curtis' boss humiliates and fires him. Curtis commits suicide, to which Walsh is left visibly distraught and feeling survivor's guilt.

In "Smile, or Go to Jail", Walsh reveals that he attended boarding school with Michaela Pratt's fiancé Aiden Walker (Elliot Knight); he discloses to Pratt that Walker may be gay, as the two previously shared a relationship while at school. Pratt and Walker later end their relationship in "Best Christmas Ever", predominantly as a result of this revelation.

The episode "It's for the Greater Good" reveals that his father is gay, and now re-married to another man. In "Was She Ever Good at Her Job?" his father tells Oliver that Connor came out to his family at age 12; that announcement prompted his father, who was closeted and married to Connor's mother, to come out to the family a week later. This prompted his mother to have a nervous breakdown, and strained Connor's relationship with his father.

Walsh has an older sister, Gemma Walsh (Jennifer Christopher), and a niece and nephew.

=== Relationship ===
Walsh and computer technician Oliver Hampton (Conrad Ricamora) have had an on-and-off relationship almost from the inception of the series. In the pilot episode, the two meet at a bar, wherein Walsh seduces Hampton into giving him illegal documents to bolster a case of Keating's. At first, Hampton denies him access to the files; however, Walsh flirts with another guy, inducing Hampton into giving him the information he wants. As a way of thanking him, Walsh has sex with Hampton, much to the technician's surprise and delight.

Throughout the first few episodes of the series, the two continue to have a casual sexual relationship while Hampton assists Walsh in obtaining information. By the fourth episode, "Let's Get to Scooping", Walsh has developed feelings for Hampton; while he attempts to reveal this to Hampton, the revelation is cut short when Hampton snoops through Walsh's phone, and learns of Walsh's tryst with a person of interest in a case. Coming to the conclusion that Walsh uses sex as means of furthering his own career, Hampton kicks him out. Months later, Walsh shows up unannounced to Hampton's place, after burning Sam Keating's body, freaking out and telling him that he "screwed up". Hampton is initially bewildered and unsure of what to do, but eventually comforts Walsh and invites him in. The following morning, Walsh lies to Hampton by saying that his behavior was a result of intoxication and that he has a drug problem. Walsh is eager to start fresh with Hampton in "Hello Raskolnikov"; however, this is not reciprocated by Hampton, who still resents Walsh's conduct. By "Best Christmas Ever", Walsh surprises Hampton with a Christmas gift – a beanie – and asks that they resume their relationship. Hampton initially resists, but he then reveals that he is addicted to Walsh.

In the penultimate episode of the first season, "The Night Lila Died", the two agree to get tested for sexually transmitted diseases (STDs). Although Walsh tests negative to any disease, it is revealed in the season finale, "It's All My Fault", that Hampton tested positive to HIV.

In the second season premiere, "It's Time to Move On", to prove that his commitment to Hampton and the relationship they share, Walsh moves into Hampton's apartment. Even though Connor disapproves, in "Two Birds, One Millstone", Oliver helps Annalise and Keating 5 in the Caleb-Catherine Hapstall case by hacking and finding a prospect suspect lead, Phillip Jessup. Unknown to them, Phillip has hacked Oliver too and knows what they are up to. When Oliver disappears for a short while, Connor panics thinking he is kidnapped. Oliver returns and says Phillip just wanted to talk, while showing a straw he snuck from Phillips for a DNA test. Connor, desperate to keep himself and Oliver away from Annalise and all the murder cases, applies to Stanford Law School and asks Oliver to move away with him, in "It's a Trap". In the final episode of second season, "Anna Mae", Oliver deletes Connor's Stanford acceptance email, calls the Dean of Students to decline his spot and hacks their system to re-route all calls to him.

In the third season premiere, "We're Good People Now", Connor asks Annalise to refuse Oliver a job that he is going to ask, saying it would ruin him. Annalise agrees and gives her word that she will not hire him. But Oliver reveals to her about Connor's Stanford email and says he can hack her too to check for security vulnerabilities. Annalise, afraid that Oliver would find out about Sam, hires him as a technical expert. With no other option, Connor agrees with Annalise. Later, when he apologizes to Oliver for not taking his feelings into account before applying to Stanford, Oliver feels this is not how healthy relationships work and that he should have been angry instead of apologizing. This leads to Oliver breaking up with Connor. After Connor wins his first pro bono case, in "There Are Worse Things Than Murder", Connor kisses Oliver and asks to be back together but Oliver does not agree. Heartbroken, Connor packs up and leaves Oliver's apartment to stay at Michaela's for a while. Connor goes back to his usual sex escapades with guys from "Humpr" and does not make an effort to hide it. Oliver, though somewhat hurt, does not say anything to him. In "Call It Mother's Intuition", Oliver goes on a date with a guy from the internet, named "Thomas" for which Connor confronts him asking why he said he needed to spend some time alone if he is going on dates with other guys. Even though Thomas expresses his interest in Oliver, he turns him down after learning Oliver is HIV positive. Oliver gets drunk and goes back to Connor where they confess that they miss each other, leading them to have sex and being back together. In "No More Blood", Oliver keeps asking Connor about the things that he is hiding which leads to another argument where Oliver calls him "emotionally damaged". Connor, once again hurt and heartbroken, goes back to Michaela's apartment and cries saying "I hate him! I hate him so much!", breaking a glass table in anger.

In "Who's Dead?", Oliver tries to apologize to Connor on multiple occasions but Connor blows him off each time. At a party sponsored by Annalise after the entire class cleared their midterms, Connor gets drunk and Oliver worries about him, reminding him about his drug problem. Connor, in his drunken state, confesses that he lied about being an addict and that he was not high that night (when Sam was murdered) but was traumatized. Later, Oliver does his own research and correctly guesses that the Keating 5 had something to do with Sam's murder. After Annalise's house burns down and Connor is unreachable, Oliver fears the worst but is relieved when Connor shows up at the hospital. In the later episodes, it's shown that Connor was at the house before it burned down and that he had seen, tried to revive Wes but failed. When everyone suspects Connor of lying, Oliver defends him and stands by him. Oliver, now aware of all the murders, tries to be understanding of how Connor handled everything alone while he cannot bring himself to go by his usual way. Connor admits this is why he did not tell him anything and that he could still go to the police, make everything stop. In the final episode, "Wes", after Connor is kidnapped and later freed from Denver by Annalise, Oliver proposes to Connor asking to marry him and "make a million babies".

In the beginning of the season four, Oliver has not gotten an answer to the proposal. Then Connor tells him that he wants to get married but not because Oliver is afraid that Connor is going to jail or someone is going to kill them. In "Nobody Roots for Goliath" Connor told Oliver that his dad told that he did not think that Oliver would be the right guy for Connor. Then, Connor proposes to him and says that he is happy because of Oliver. Then, Oliver is told he's been lying to Connor because he knows who killed Wes. Then, Connor goes straight to Laurel's and before Laurel opens the door, he says Oliver that he gave the ring back because he thought they were in a good place and because Oliver lied to him. In "Ask Him About Stella", Connor says that he wants to go to law school again and says that it would be difficult with the school and planning the wedding. Then Asher asks " Did you just... ?". Which Connor replies " What do you say? You still want to marry me, Oli?" and Oliver says "You're the one that called if off" and Connor's answer to that "Well, it's called back on."

In season 5, Oliver and Connor move to another house because they wanted to save money for the wedding. Then Connor's and Oliver's mothers come to visit them before the wedding. Later, Oliver told his mom about the HIV and then his mom told that "I just hate that you felt you had to go through this all alone" then Oliver says that "I wasn't alone, I had Connor". A few night's before the wedding in episode "I Got Played", Connor and Oliver had a meeting with a minister, who marries them. The minister asks that why they want to marry and Oliver answer that it's "really simple. I wanna know and spent time with Connor for the rest of my life." and Connor answers that "because he's the best thing that's ever happened to me." In a later part of the episode, Connor says to Oliver that "I will marry you in church for a million times as long as I can be with you." In "I Want to Love You Until the Day I Die" Oliver and Connor get married. Oliver says in his vow to Connor that "My dream was you". And Connor says to Oliver "Because of you, I want things I told myself I never did. I want to love you until the day I die. You're everything to me". Then later on the episode, Oliver sings to Connor the song "All of Me" by John Legend.

In season 6, Connor and Oliver had a threesome with a man called Ravi. When Oliver told Connor that he knows maybe were Laurel is, (because Frank told him) Connor says "I'm your husband. You can say anything to me and I can take it because we're married and I don't wanna divorce yet even though I'm really angry right now." Then, Oliver says that "I knew you would tell Annalise" Then Connor says "No, I wouldn't," and Oliver answers to that "I don't know if I believe that" and Connor says then "You don't trust me that's what you are saying. After everything we been through together. I'm your husband who loves you more than anything in the world, you don't trust me." When Connor was arrested for killing Asher, he could take a deal and he wouldn't go to jail. Oliver tries to get Connor to take the deal. Connor eventually takes a deal for five years in prison and immunity for Oliver, only to later learn that Michaela and Laurel got deals for probation. Connor subsequently expresses remorse for his life of lying and deceit and after Laurel reveals their perjury on the stand, Connor decides to go to prison and stop lying. Connor files for divorce from Oliver, feeling that he is only causing Oliver harm and turning him into a bad person. As he is arrested following Annalise's exoneration, Connor hands his wedding ring over to Oliver, who refuses to accept the divorce. Connor's last words to his husband are to thank Oliver for showing him how to truly love someone.

In the flash-forwards in the series finale, its shown that Connor and Oliver's relationship ultimately did survive and they did not get divorced. Connor and Oliver are seen attending Annalise's funeral together years later, waving at Laurel, who identifies them as old friends to her now-adult son Christopher Castillo.

=== Friendship ===
Connor spends most of his time with the Keating 5 and Oliver, his husband. It is shown that he is closest with Michaela (Aja Naomi King). After learning about Connor applying for Stanford, Michaela asks him to stay back saying "I can't survive here without you". She also lets Connor crash at her place after Oliver breaks up with him and defends him after learning about Connor's role on the night Wes was murdered, even though Asher (Matt McGorry) and Laurel (Karla Souza) do not believe him at all.

Not the best friendship and not shown openly, Connor had a cordial relationship with Wes (Alfred Enoch). In "We're Bad People", Connor revealed to Wes that he was going to therapy nowadays like he did when he was 17 and was struggling with coming-out issues, and jokes that except this time he talks about the murders. He clears it up that he talked about Oliver. After Wes died, Connor did not have kind words for him, which was him channeling his grief in a bad way, which lead Asher and Laurel to dislike and suspect him. Asher punches Connor but later they forgive each other. Asher has always been a supportive friend to Connor and likewise Connor too helped Asher after his father died, even though his intentions were not entirely pure at that time.

In "He Made a Terrible Mistake", after learning about Connor's role on the night Wes was murdered, Laurel goes on a rant against him saying he's lying, he's the reason Wes died, and that, he should take a gun and kill himself, unaware that Connor is already struggling with suicidal thoughts.

Connor has a "bratty" relationship with Annalise and makes it clear, more often than not, that he does not trust her. When Annalise confronts Connor about Wes' death, Connor has an outburst where he says hurtful things after she calls him "paranoid and broken" and someone who's afraid to live alone and trust anyone since he was a child. Annalise understands Connor and asks the group to forgive him, saying he might kill himself if they did not, thus making it clear that she knows about Connor's suicidal thoughts. She has also referred few times to herself saying she and Connor are "worriers" and are similar in nature.

== Reception ==
The character as well as Falahee's acting have been well received by both fans and critics of the series. After the first season of Murder (2014–15), Connor Walsh was ranked by IndieWire thirteenth in a list of "best LGBT characters on television". IndieWire went further, stating: "He's definitely not an ideal human being, but he's certainly an authentic fascinating one." Vanity Fair columnist, Richard Lawson, was partly drawn to the series because of the character Walsh, commending "Falahee’s ambitious, underhanded Connor Walsh [who is] allowed to be both good and bad, saint and sinner." When accepting the "Outstanding Drama Series" award at the 26th GLAAD Media Awards on behalf of the Murder cast, actress Viola Davis emphasized the importance of Walsh and his journey. TVOvermind praised Falahee for his portrayal of Walsh, contending that the actor "plays his role to a tee."
