= Jack Falahee =

American actor and singer (born 1989)

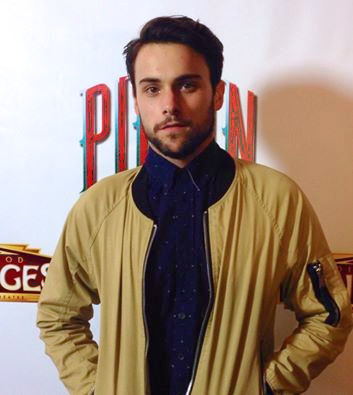
- Falahee in 2015
- Born: February 20, 1989 (age 37); Ann Arbor, Michigan, U.S.
- Education: New York University (BFA)
- Occupation: Actor
- Years active: 2012–present
- Television: How to Get Away with Murder

Jack Falahee (born February 20, 1989) is an American actor and singer. On television, he portrayed Connor Walsh on the ABC legal thriller How to Get Away with Murder (2014–2020) and Frank Stringfellow on the PBS historical drama Mercy Street (2016–2017).

== Early and personal life ==
Jack Falahee was born on February 20, 1989, and raised in Ann Arbor, Michigan, the son of a speech pathologist mother and a neurosurgeon father. He is of Irish and Italian descent. Growing up, Falahee attended a Catholic school described as "rigorous". He began acting while attending Huron High School. In 2011, Falahee graduated from New York University's Tisch School of the Arts with a Bachelor of Fine Arts in Drama, where he studied acting and performed in a number of productions, including Love's Labour's Lost, A Midsummer Night's Dream and Sondheim's Company. His first screen acting job was in 2012, with a guest starring role in the comedy web series Submissions Only. Also in that year he had the leading role in the short film Sunburn. He also studied acting at the International Theater Workshop in Amsterdam.

== Career ==
Falahee made his television debut in 2013, with a guest-starring role in The CW teen comedy-drama series The Carrie Diaries and later appeared on the short-lived NBC series Ironside. He starred in the Lifetime movie Escape from Polygamy, which premiered on August 24, 2013. Falahee later had roles in a number of independent films, including Hunter, Blood and Circumstance and Slider. In 2014, he appeared in action-thriller Rage. Also in that year, he had a recurring role of Charlie McBride on the ABC Family teen drama series, Twisted. He also co-starred as Henri in the 2015 film Lily & Kat.

On February 12, 2014, Falahee was cast in the series regular role of the ABC legal thriller series How to Get Away with Murder, produced by Shonda Rhimes. He played the role of one of the five lead students, Connor Walsh. The series premiered on September 25, 2014, to generally positive reviews from critics and 14 million viewers.

Falahee also had a role in the PBS period drama Mercy Street, which premiered in January 2016. He played Frank Stringfellow, a Confederate soldier scout during the Civil War. The series' second season premiered January 22, 2017, with Falahee reprising his role as Stringfellow.

In September 2019, Falahee and childhood friend and DJ Elephante announced the launch of their music project, Diplomacy. They released "Silver Lake Queen" as their debut single on October 16, launched tickets for their debut tour in January 2020 – which was later postponed due to the COVID-19 pandemic – and released their self-titled EP on February 19, 2020. Falahee is Diplomacy's lead singer and has stated he writes most of their songs based on his personal journal entries.

== Charitable and community work ==
On September 20, 2015, Falahee participated in the Nautica Malibu Triathlon and partnered with Disney to raise money for Los Angeles Children's Hospital's pediatric cancer research program. He raised over $12,000 in donations for this cause. He also participated in the Nautica Malibu Triathlon in 2016 and 2017 together with his How to Get Away with Murder castmates Karla Souza and Conrad Ricamora. He is also involved in the AKASA Community Outreach Project "that provides a diversified wellness curriculum in partnership with public schools in low-income communities throughout Los Angeles. Students learn about the process of growing, harvesting, sourcing and cooking food and examine their own neighborhood food system."

== Filmography ==
=== Film ===
Key
†	Denotes films that have not yet been released

Year	Title	Role	Notes
2012	Sunburn	Kevin	Short film
2013	Hunter	Gavin	
2014	Rage	Evan	
2014	Blood and Circumstance	Danny Stabler	
2014	Slider	Parker Pierce	
2015	Blowtorch	Michael Vardi	
2015	Lily & Kat	Henry	
2015	Campus Code	Elliot	
2016	Cardboard Boxer	Leo	
2018	The Song of Sway Lake	Jimmy	
2018	We Are Boats	Michael Lamina	
2023	Hayseed	Duck McIlrath	
2025	Forge	Harrison	
TBA	The Block †	Mitch James	Post-production

=== Television ===
Year	Title	Role	Notes
2012	Submissions Only	Clenched Student	Episode: "The Growing Interconnectedness"
2013	The Carrie Diaries	Colin	Episode: "Hush Hush"
2013	Ironside	Scott Dolan	Episode: "Hidden Agenda"
2013	Escape from Polygamy	Ryder	Television film
2014	Twisted	Charlie McBride	Recurring role
2014–2020	How to Get Away with Murder	Connor Walsh	Main role
2016–2017	Mercy Street	Frank Stringfellow	Recurring role
2025	Grosse Pointe Garden Society	Pierce	2 episodes
2025	Chicago Med	Devin Carter	Episode: "Found Family", "Double Down", and "Triple Threat"
