= Tom Verica =

American actor

- Born: May 13, 1964 (age 62); Philadelphia, Pennsylvania, U.S.
- Occupations: Actor, director, producer
- Years active: 1987–present

Tom Verica (born May 13, 1964) is an American actor, director, and producer. As an actor, he is best known for his role as Sam Keating in the ABC drama How to Get Away with Murder (2014–2020). He also played Jack Pryor in the NBC critically acclaimed drama American Dreams from 2002 to 2004. He is known for directing Shonda Rhimes' dramas. He is an executive producer and director of the Netflix drama Bridgerton. From 2012 to 2018, Verica served as executive producer and director of ABC's Scandal.

== Early life ==
Verica was born on May 13, 1964, in Philadelphia, Pennsylvania, to parents who worked as real estate agents. He is of Italian descent on his father's side and German descent on his mother's side. His family, originally from South Philadelphia, later moved to Havertown, Pennsylvania, where he grew up.

== Career ==
=== Acting ===
Verica's first television role was on the ABC daytime soap opera All My Children in 1987. He later had a recurring role in L.A. Law, and guest-starred on Home Improvement, Picket Fences, Seinfeld and NYPD Blue. In film, he appeared in Die Hard 2, Fathers' Day, Red Dragon, and Zodiac. He played astronaut Dick Gordon in the HBO miniseries From The Earth To The Moon (1998), and appeared in The Naked Truth.

Verica was a regular cast member of the CBS primetime soap opera Central Park West from 1995 to 1996, and appeared in Providence in 1999. From 2002 to 2005, he starred opposite Gail O'Grady in the NBC family drama, American Dreams. After the series was canceled, Verica guest-starred on Law & Order: Special Victims Unit, House, Boston Legal, Grey's Anatomy, and The Closer, and had recurring roles in The 4400 and The Nine.

In 2009, he played Joe Mason in Princess Protection Program. In 2014, he was cast opposite Viola Davis in the Shondaland series, How to Get Away with Murder.

=== Directing and producing ===
In 2003, Verica began his career as a director. He has directed episodes of more than 20 television shows, including American Dreams, Boston Legal, Dirty Sexy Money, Ugly Betty, Army Wives, The Mentalist, and Body of Proof.

Since 2007, he has directed more than 60 episodes of Shonda Rhimes' Shondaland dramas. These include Grey's Anatomy, Private Practice, Scandal (also producer), Still Star-Crossed, For the People (also producer), Station 19, Bridgerton (also producer), Inventing Anna (also producer) and Queen Charlotte: A Bridgerton Story (also producer).

== Filmography ==
=== Film ===
Year	Title	Role	Notes
1990	Die Hard 2	Kahn	
1993	Eight Hundred Leagues Down the Amazon	Manoel	
1997	Fathers' Day	Peter	
1997	Loose Women	Detective Laurent	
1999	Love American Style	Ron	Segment: "Love and the Heimlich Maneuver"
1999	Making Contact	—N/a	
2002	Murder by Numbers	Asst. D.A. Al Swanson	
2002	Red Dragon	Charles Leeds	
2006	Flags of Our Fathers	Lieutenant Pennell	
2007	Zodiac	Jim Dunbar	

=== Television films ===
Year	Title	Role	Notes
1993	Donato and Daughter	Bobby Keegan	
1994	The Babymaker: The Dr. Cecil Jacobson Story	Greg Bennett	
1994	Breach of Conduct	Lt. Ted Lutz	
1995	Not Our Son	Randy Litchfield	
1996	The Assassination File	Jack Byrne	
1998	Lost in the Bermuda Triangle	Brian Foster	
2009	Princess Protection Program	Joe Mason	

=== Television series ===
Year	Title	Role	Notes
1987	All My Children	Duncan	Unknown episodes
1989	Quantum Leap	Impala	Episode: "Camikazi Kid - June 6, 1961"
1991	L.A. Law	Billy Castroverti	9 episodes
1992	Home Improvement	Charlie	Episode: "Luck Be a Taylor Tonight"
1992	Picket Fences	Brian Ronick	Episode: "The Snake Lady"
1993	South Beach	Brooke Wyatt	Episode: "Stake Out"
1993	Moon Over Miami	Jake	Episode: "Black River Bride"
1993	Seinfeld	Doctor	Episode: "The Conversion"
1995	NYPD Blue	Dr. Paul Druzinski	Episode: "Travels with Andy"
1995	Matlock	Craig Browning	Episode: "The Scam"
1995–1996	Central Park West	Mark Merrill	18 episodes
1996	The Big Easy	Tyrell	Episode: "Hotshots"
1997	Gun	The Quick Talking Agent	Episode: "The Shot"
1997	Almost Perfect	Steven Ecstacy	Episode: "This Is What Happens When You Don't Watch PBS"
1997–1998	The Naked Truth	Jake Sullivan	22 episodes
1998	From the Earth to the Moon	Dick Gordon	3 episodes
1999	Providence	Kyle Moran	13 episodes
1999–2002	Will & Grace	Danny	2 episodes
2001	Frasier	Jim	Episode: "A Day in May"
2001	Citizen Baines	Andy Carlson	4 episodes
2001–2004	State of Grace	Tommy Austin	6 episodes
2002	Crossing Jordan	Mitch Weyland	Episode: "Blood Relatives"
2002	Baby Bob	Jake	Episode: "The Tell-Tale Art"
2002	Touched by an Angel	Brian	Episode: "The Bells of St. Peters"
2002–2005	American Dreams	Jack Pryor	61 episodes
2005	The Bad Girl's Guide	Keith	Episode: "The Guide to in and Out"
2005	The 4400	Dr. Max Hudson	3 episodes
2006	Law & Order: Special Victims Unit	Jake Hunter	Episode: "Blast"
2006	House	Martin	Episode: "Skin Deep"
2006	Boston Legal	A.U.S.A. Carl Newell	Episode: "Trick or Treat"
2006–2007	The Nine	Ed Nielson	10 episodes
2008	Grey's Anatomy	Michael Norris	Episode: "Rise Up"
2009	Lie to Me	Paul Aronson	Episode: "Love Always"
2009	Medium	Detective Aaron Carver	Episode: "The Future's So Bright"
2010	The Closer	Det. Steve Hayward	Episode: "Jump the Gun"
2014–2020	How to Get Away with Murder	Sam Keating	23 episodes Recurring (season 1–2, 6), guest (season 3–5)
2017	Dropping the Soap	Mitch Gatlin	Episode: "Spontaneous Coma"

=== Director ===
Year	Title	Notes
2004	American Dreams	2 episodes
2007	What About Brian	Episode: "What About Strange Bedfellows...?"
2007	Six Degrees	Episode: "Objects in the Mirror"
2007–2008	Boston Legal	2 episodes
2007–2011	Grey's Anatomy	9 episodes
2008	Men in Trees	Episode: "Read Between the Minds"
2008	The Cleaner	Episode: "Rebecca"
2008	My Own Worst Enemy	Episode : #1.10
2008–2012	Private Practice	7 episodes
2009	Ugly Betty	2 episodes
2009	The Beast	Episode: "Mercy"
2009	Dirty Sexy Money	Episode: "The Facts"
2009	Army Wives	Episode: "As Time Goes By"
2009	Eastwick	Episode: "Red Ants and Black Widows"
2010	The Deep End	Episode: "White Lies, Black Ties"
2010	No Ordinary Family	Episode: "No Ordinary Family"
2011–2012	The Mentalist	3 episodes
2011–2012	Harry's Law	2 episodes
2012	Body of Proof	Episode: "Going Viral, Part 2"
2012–2018	Scandal	16 episodes; also executive producer
2017	Still Star-Crossed	Episode: "Hell is Empty and All the Devils Are Here"
2018–2019	For the People	6 episodes; also executive producer
2020	Station 19	Episode: "No Days Off"
2020	The Umbrella Academy	2 episodes
2020–2026	Bridgerton	8 episodes; also executive producer
2021	Inventing Anna	2 episodes
2023	Queen Charlotte: A Bridgerton Story	6 episodes; also executive producer
