= Karla Souza =

Mexican actress (born 1985)

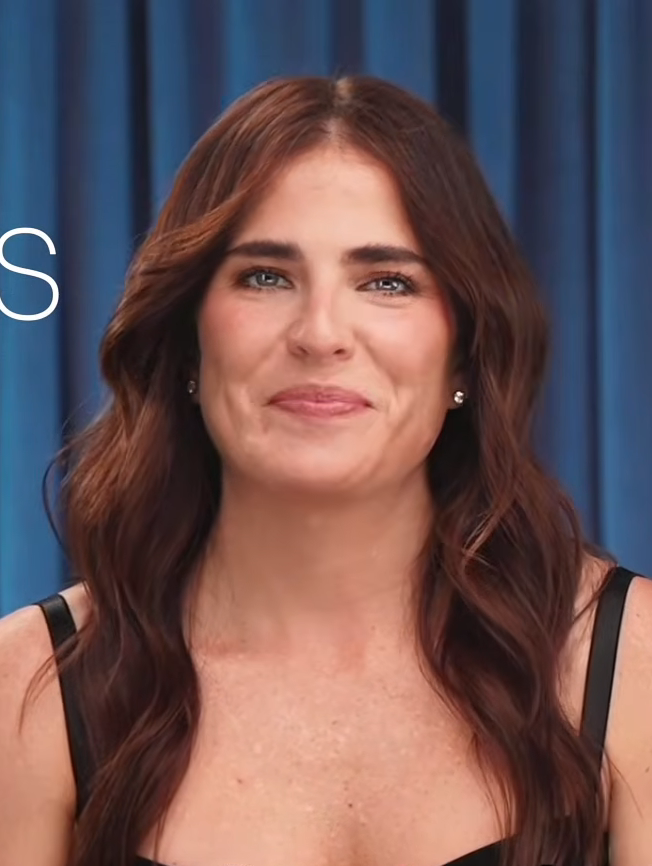
- Souza in 2026
- Born: Karla Susana Olivares Souza; 11 December 1985 (age 40); Mexico City, Mexico
- Citizenship: Mexico; United States
- Education: Royal Central School of Speech and Drama
- Occupation: Actress
- Years active: 1993–present
- Spouse: Marshall J. Trenkmann (m. 2014)
- Children: 3

Karla Susana Olivares Souza (born 11 December 1985) is a Mexican actress known for her roles as Laurel Castillo on the ABC legal drama series How to Get Away with Murder and Marina Hayworth on the ABC sitcom Home Economics. She won the International Emmy Award for Best Actress in 2023 for her role as Mariel Saenz in the television movie La Caída.

== Early life and education ==
Souza was born in Mexico City, Mexico, on December 11, 1985, to a Chilean father and a Mexican mother, Mónica. Her grandmother, Elba Silva, immigrated from Chile to New York City in the 1960s and worked as an assistant cook for the Rockefeller family for 20 years.

Having lived in Aspen, Colorado until she was eight years old, Souza credits her grandmother's immigration to the United States as the reason she holds an American passport. Souza studied acting at Centro de Educación Artística, an acting school run by Televisa, in Mexico City. She also attended acting school in France and was part of a professional theatre company that toured throughout that country. While still in France, Souza auditioned and was selected to participate in the French reality TV show Star Academy, however, she turned down the offer after receiving an invitation to study at London's Central School of Speech and Drama. She graduated from the school in 2008 with a Bachelor of Arts in acting. Near the end of her London studies, she received a CCP award, traditionally presented to the most promising actress in London. After being selected to go to Moscow with Anatoly Smilianski for an acting intensive, she returned to Mexico City and began acting in television and film when she was 22.

== Career ==
Souza had her television debut in 2009 on the Mexican telenovela Verano de amor. She later starred in Mexican sitcoms Los Héroes del Norte and La Clínica. Her film roles include From Prada to Nada; in 2013, she was also in two Mexican box office hits, Nosotros los Nobles and Instructions Not Included. In 2014, Souza moved to Los Angeles to pursue English-language film and television roles. She was cast as a series regular in the Shonda Rhimes-produced legal drama series How to Get Away with Murder as law student Laurel Castillo, opposite Viola Davis. In February 2015, Souza appeared on the cover of Women's Health.

From 2021-2023, Souza played Marina on the ABC sitcom Home Economics. In November 2026, she was cast as Dr. Carolina “Lina” Hall in the third spin-off of Grey's Anatomy.

== Personal life ==
In December 2013, Souza became engaged to Marshall Trenkmann and the couple married in May 2014. Together, they have three children: daughter Gianna (born April 2018), son Luka (born June 2020), and daughter Giulia (born March 2024).

Souza is fluent in Spanish, English, and French.

Souza gave a TEDx talk in León, Guanajuato, on March 21, 2015, titled "Sweet are the Fruits of Adversity." It became the most-seen Spanish TEDx talk with millions of views.

On 21 February 2018, Souza appeared on Mexican journalist Carmen Aristegui's show and revealed that she had been a victim of sexual assault. Souza stated that, when she was 22, she was raped by the director of a TV show she was working in; she did not name her attacker.

== Filmography ==
=== Film ===
Year	Title	Role	Notes
1993	Aspen Extreme	Kimberly	
2010	El efecto tequila	Ana Luisa	
2011	From Prada to Nada	Lucy	
2012	Suave patria	Roxana Robledo	ACE Award for Best New Actress
2013	31 días	Mayra	
2013	Me Late Chocolate	Moni	
2013	Nosotros los Nobles	Bárbara Noble	Pantalla de Cristal Film Festival Award for Best Actress; Diosas de Plata for Best Performance – Actress
2013	Instructions Not Included	Jackie	
2014	The Popcorn Chronicles	Supper Burrows Manager	Scene deleted
2015	Sundown	Ashley Lopez	
2016	¿Qué culpa tiene el niño?	Maru	Premios Luminus 2017 – Best Actress, Also Producer
2017	Everybody Loves Somebody	Clara Barron	
2018	The Jesuit	Collie	
2019	Jacob's Ladder	Annie/Angel	
2020	The Sleepover	Jay	
2022	Voy a pasármelo bien	Layla	
2022	Day Shift	Audrey San Fernando	
2022	La Caída	Mariel Saenz	
2024	Technoboys	Melena	
2026	Mexico 86	Susana Gómez Mont	

=== Television ===
Year	Title	Role	Notes
2008	Terminales	Vanessa	Episode: "Espejismos"
2009	Verano de amor	Dana Villalba Duarte	Telenovela, 120 episodes
2010	Persons Unknown	Dosette	Episode: "And Then There Was One"
2010–11	Los Héroes del Norte	Prisca	Series regular, 36 episodes
2011	Niño Santo	Lucia	Starring, 23 episodes
2012	La Clinica	Maripily Rivadeneyra	Series regular
2014–20	How to Get Away with Murder	Laurel Castillo	78 episodes Main (season 1–5), recurring (season 6)
2016	Whose Line is it Anyway	Herself	Season 4
2020	El Presidente	Rosario	Main role, 8 episodes
2021–23	Home Economics	Marina	Main role
2026	56 Days	Lee Reardon	Main role

=== Other ===
Year	Title	Role	Notes	Ref.
2020–2021	From Now	Separatist Leader	Podcast series; voice role	

== Awards ==
National Hispanic Media Coalition "Outstanding Performance in a Television Series (How To Get Away with Murder)", 2017.

== Awards and nominations ==
Year	Award	Category	Work	Result
2022	Premios PRODU	Premio Crossover	Carrera Artística	Won
2022	Festival de Cine de los Cabos	Premio "Mujeres Fantásticas"	Reconocimiento Industria Fílmica	Won
2014	Diosas de Plata	Best Actress	Nosotros, los Nobles	Nominated
2013	Premios ACE	Best Actress Revelation	Suave patria	Nominated
2013	Festival Pantalla de Cristal	Best Actress	Nosotros, los Nobles	Won
2023	International Emmy Awards	Best Actress	La Caída	Won
