= International Day of Zero Tolerance for Female Genital Mutilation =

Annual awareness day of genital mutilation

- Significance: Awareness of female genital mutilation
- Date: 6 February
- Next time: 6 February 2027
- Frequency: Annual
- Website: International Day of Zero Tolerance for FGM, United Nations

International Day of Zero Tolerance for Female Genital Mutilation is a United Nations-sponsored annual awareness day that takes place on February 6 as part of the UN's efforts to eradicate female genital mutilation. It was first introduced in 2003.

== History ==
One of the beliefs in support for this day acknowledges that culture is in "constant flux", and with the concerns begetting FGM being so high-risk, the abolition of such practices must be prompt. This is a movement for the rights of women and their bodies, as well as the protection of their physical health—which can be tremendously affected later in life. These efforts are to benefit actions fighting violence against women and girls as a whole. Every Woman, Every Child (a global movement), reports that "Although primarily concentrated in 29 countries in Africa and the Middle East, FGM is a universal problem and is also practiced in some countries in Asia and Latin America. FGM continues to persist amongst immigrant populations living in Western Europe, North America, Australia and New Zealand." In the United States alone, the recent reports of how many women and young girls are affected by FGM staggeringly tripled in numbers in comparison to the previous reports in 1990. About 120 to 140 million women have been subject to FGM over the years and currently at least 3 million girls are at risk each year, in accord to data presented by the World Health Organization (WHO). It is an effort to make the world aware of FGM and to promote its eradication. The World Health Organization has said that "Though the practice has persisted for over a thousand years, programmatic evidence suggests that FGM/C can end in one generation."

== Activism ==
Percentage of the 0–14 group who have undergone FGM in 21 countries for which figures were available in 2016

Percentage of the 15–49 age group who have undergone FGM in 29 countries for which figures were available in 2016

In 1993 UNICEF was only budgeting US$100,000/year for efforts that fight against FGM, which proved insufficient as FGM was affecting more than 100 million girls at the time. Equality Now, an international network of lawyers, activists and supporters that aim to hold governments responsible for ending FGM and other world crisis, launched a "global campaign" calling for increased funding and in response, UNICEF increased its budget to nearly $91 million in efforts towards ending FGM.

On February 6, 2003, Stella Obasanjo, the First Lady of Nigeria and spokesperson for the Campaign Against Female Genital Mutilation, made the official declaration on "Zero Tolerance to FGM" in Africa during a conference organized by the Inter-African Committee on Traditional Practices Affecting the Health of Women and Children (IAC). Then the UN Sub-Commission on Human Rights adopted this day as an international awareness day.

Activists: Young female students from Integrate Bristol, including Fahma Mohamed and her colleagues at Bristol, used their resources and voice to protest against FGM in their countries. The young girls went to measures as deep as coming face to face with the ones who cut them, to confronting their fathers/authority, to petitioning using resources such as Change.Org. The United Nations, UN, got involved with this activist event alongside the students and made efforts to make a more permanent recognition and proclamation of zero tolerance for the persisting epidemic of FGM.

In 2014, 17-year-old Bristol student Fahma Mohamed created an online petition with Change.org on the International Day of Zero Tolerance to Female Genital Mutilation, asking Michael Gove, then the education secretary in the United Kingdom, to write to the leaders of all primary and secondary schools in the United Kingdom, encouraging them to be alert to the dangers of FGM. The petition attained more than 230,000 supporters and was one of the fastest growing UK petitions on Change.org. Michael Gove met with Fahma Mohamed and members of the youth group Integrate Bristol, who have also played a key role in raising awareness of FGM. He also sent a letter to all headteachers in England informing them of new guidelines on children's safety, including guidance on FGM. These new guidelines marked the first time the safeguarding guidelines included specific mention of FGM and encouraged teachers to be vigilant against it.

== Human rights ==
Carol Bellamy, executive director of the UN's Children's Agency (UNICEF), noted that "Female genital mutilation and cutting is a violation of the basic rights of women and girls," and that "it is a dangerous and irreversible procedure that negatively impacts the general health, childbearing capabilities and educational opportunities of girls and women."

It has been spoken about on numerous occasions that holding a day for zero intolerance of FGM is not just based on medical precautions, but as a way to protest the misogyny that is indirectly posed by the practice. Written in an informational article about FGM on Every Woman, Every Child, which is a movement launched by UN Secretary-General Ban Ki-moon that puts into action the Global Strategy for Women's, Children's and Adolescents' Health, online database, it is noted that, "it reflects deep-rooted inequality between the sexes, and constitutes an extreme form of discrimination against women and girls," in reference to the practice of FGM.

== Health risks ==
=== Short term ===
Severe pain, excessive bleeding (hemorrhage), shock, genital tissue swelling: due to inflammatory response or local infection, infections, human immunodeficiency virus (HIV), urination problems, impaired wound healing: can lead to pain, infections and abnormal scarring, death (can be caused by infections such as tetanus and hemorrhage), and psychological consequences such as trauma (many women describe FGM as a traumatic event).

=== Long term ===
Pain, painful urination, menstrual problems, keloids, human immunodeficiency virus (HIV), obstetric fistula, perinatal risks, and psychological consequences such as post-traumatic stress disorder (PTSD), anxiety disorders and depression. Infections are also a common effect of these procedures (often happening more than once), which include chronic genital infections, chronic reproductive tract infections, and urinary tract infection. Female sexual health is also affected long term, presenting issues such as decreased sexual desire and pleasure, pain during sex, difficulty during penetration, decreased lubrication during intercourse, reduced frequency or absence of orgasm (anorgasmia). Lastly, obstetric complications often result post FGM procedures, some of which including an increased risk of difficult labour, having a Caesarean section performed, experiencing postpartum hemorrhage, or a recourse to episiotomy.

== Joint statement ==
The World Health Organization, the United Nations Children's Fund, and the United Nations Population Fund (UNFP) collectively agreed upon the inhumane practice that is FGM. This consensus was based on the presented health risks and human indignity that accompanies FGM. UNFP's website, in an article written on last year's observance of the International Day of Zero Tolerance for FGM (February 6, 2016), stated that "UNFPA and UNICEF jointly lead the largest global program to accelerate the abandonment of female genital mutilation."

== Legislation ==
There are laws regarding the banning of FGM both in the United States and in other nations. In the United States, "the federal law addressing FGM in the U.S. is 18 U.S. Code § 116 'Female Genital Mutilation.' The law makes it illegal to perform FGM in the U.S. or knowingly transport a girl out of the U.S. for purpose of inflicting FGM."

In 1996, Equality Now began a campaign against the detention of a 17-year-old girl, Fauziya Kassindja. She had escaped from Togo, a West African country who traditionally practices FGM, as she was fleeing from FGM as well as a forced marriage in 1994. A ground-breaking decision allowed her to be granted asylum in the U.S. shortly after the campaign. This case served as a catalyst towards FGM as being a form of gender-based persecution that permitted women the ability to seek asylum in the U.S if endangered. Shortly following the events surrounding Fauziya's case, the federal law banning FGM was passed in the U.S.

The US also recognized that girls residing in the US were being taken out of the country for "vacations" to countries that their parents had relating descent from and receiving the treatment in those countries while they were away. On April 26, 2010, Congressman Joseph Crowley and Congresswoman Mary Bono Mack introduced The Girls' Protection Act (H.R. 5137), which is a bipartisan legislation co-sponsored by over 138 Members of Congress in addition to the support from Equality Now, to address this gaping loophole of girls receiving the procedure out of the country.

The year 2012 was significant for activism towards intolerance of FGM. In 2012, the UNFPA observed the day on 8 February, which included a special high level event held at the United Nations in New York. In August 2012, the "U.S. Strategy to Prevent and Respond to Gender-Based Violence Globally" was introduced by the U.S. D.O.S. (Department of State) alongside the U.S. Agency for International Development, which explicitly defines FGM as a form of violence against women and girls. Again in 2012 in the latter month of December, the UN General Assembly adopted Resolution A/RES/67/146, a resolution that calls upon states within the inclusive representation of the United Nations system, civil society and stakeholders together to continue to observe 6 February as the International Day of Zero Tolerance for Female Genital Mutilation and to use the day to enhance awareness-raising campaigns and to take concrete actions against female genital mutilations".

Countries where FGM is frequently that currently have some form of written legislation concerning FGM or events surrounding FGM such as deliberate harm to a child include Burkina Faso, Central African Republic, Côte d'Ivoire, Djibouti, Egypt, Ghana, Guinea, Nigeria, Senegal, Somalia, Tanzania, Togo, Uganda and more.

== Observing the day ==
The International Day of Zero Tolerance for FGM is not a public holiday, but a day of international observation. This day is a part of a combined effort by the UN to meet one of its Sustainable Development Goals, which the elimination of FGM is a key target under Goal 5.

The observance of the Day of Zero Tolerance for FGM continues to be practiced every year on February 6 and will be greatly pursued by the UN and other social activism parties in efforts to eliminate FGM by the year 2030. Awareness has been rising for FGM with constant pursuit of activism. On Zero Tolerance Day, February 6, 2015, it was reported by Equality Now that "the White House, the Department of Justice, the U.S. Agency for International Development, the Ambassador at-Large for Global Women's Issues, and the USCIS all issued statements condemning FGM from being practiced."

== See also ==
- International Day for the Elimination of Violence against Women
- Zero tolerance
- Ifrah Ahmed
- A Girl from Mogadishu
