= Lela Rochon =

American actress (born 1964)

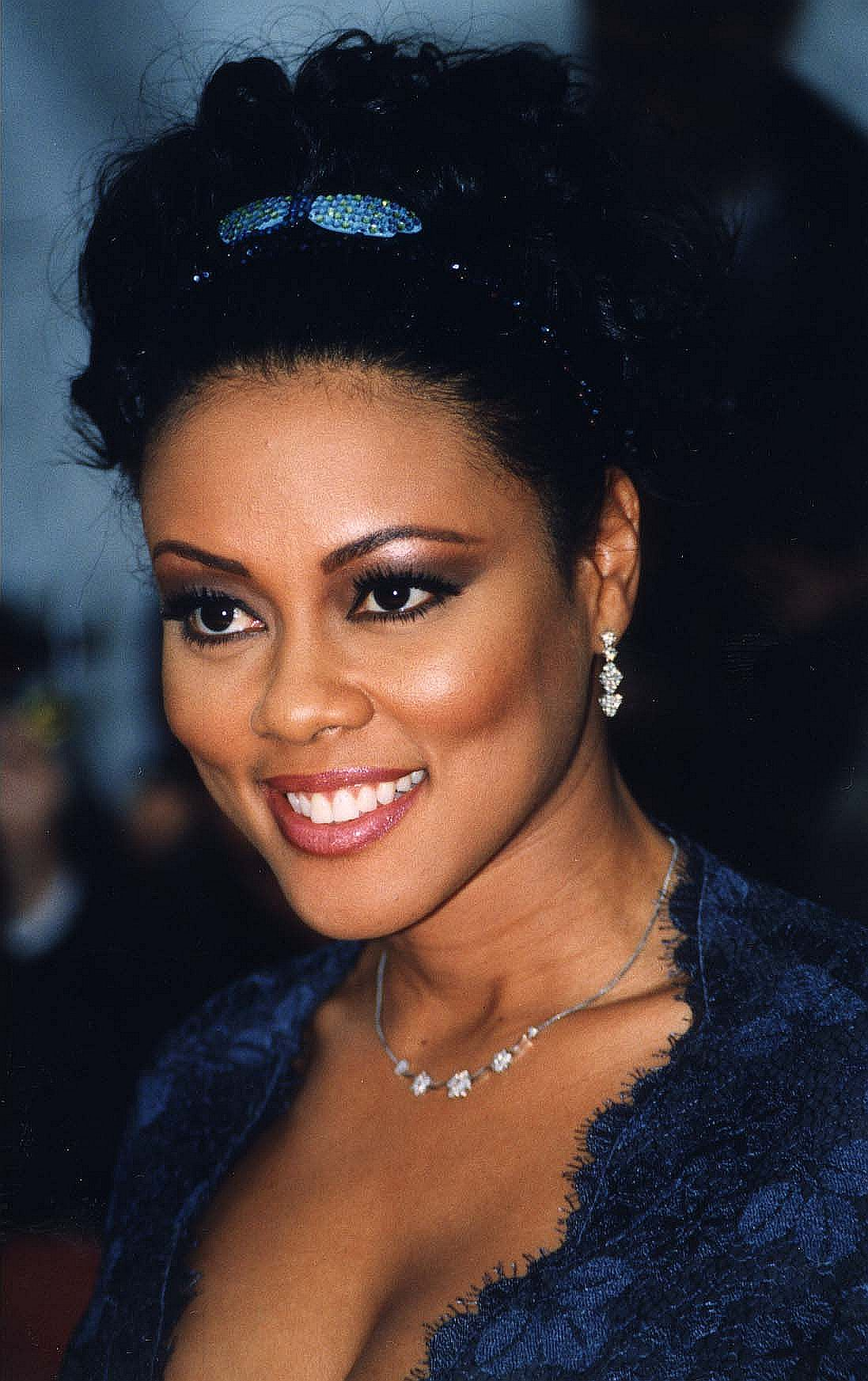
- Rochon at the New York City Essence Awards, 1998.
- Born: Lela Rochon Staples; April 17, 1964 (age 62); Torrance, California, U.S.
- Education: California State University, Dominguez Hills
- Occupation: Actress
- Years active: 1984–present
- Spouses: Adolfo Quiñones (m. 1982; div. 1987) Antoine Fuqua (m. 1999)
- Children: 2

Lela Rochon Fuqua (née Staples; April 17, 1964) is an American actress. She is best known for her starring role as Robin Stokes in the 1995 romantic drama film Waiting to Exhale. Rochon also had roles in the films Harlem Nights (1989), Boomerang (1992), The Chamber (1996), Gang Related (1997), Knock Off (1998), Why Do Fools Fall in Love (1998), and Any Given Sunday (1999).

== Early life ==
Rochon was born in the Los Angeles suburb of Torrance, the daughter of Zelma, a nurse practitioner, and Samuel Staples, a business owner and graphic artist. She is a 1982 graduate of Cerritos High School in Cerritos, California. In 1986, she graduated from California State University, Dominguez Hills (CSUDH), where she earned a bachelor's degree in broadcast journalism, with minors in sociology and theatre. In 2016, Rochon returned to CSUDH as the keynote speaker at the commencement ceremonies for the College of Arts and Humanities.

== Career ==
=== Early works ===
In 1984, Rochon appeared as an extra in the movie Breakin’, where she met the man who would later become her husband. From 1986 to 1988, while attending college, Rochon was one of the "Spudettes" featured in over 30 national spots for the Spuds MacKenzie Budweiser/Bud Light TV commercials. She also appeared in the 1985 made-for-television film A Bunny's Tale starring Kirstie Alley and Delta Burke, based on Gloria Steinem's experiences as a Playboy Bunny. She appeared as the love interest of Gerald Levert in the video for "My Forever Love" by Levert, and in Luther Vandross' "It's Over Now" video. She also appeared in the music video for Lionel Richie's single "All Night Long (All Night)", in Al B. Sure's video for the song "Natalie", and in Tupac Shakur's video "I Get Around" as one of the female dancers. She had many guest starring roles in a number of sitcoms, include The Cosby Show, Amen, 227, The Fresh Prince of Bel-Air, and Hangin' with Mr. Cooper. Rochon made her film debut in 1985, when she starred opposite Fred Williamson in Fox Trap. In 1987, she played the role of Debby in the film The Wild Pair, starring Beau Bridges and Bubba Smith. In August 1988, she filled in as a game show model on American game show "Card Sharks" on CBS. In 1989, Rochon acted opposite Eddie Murphy in 1989's Harlem Nights, as the memorable "Sunshine" character. She again worked with Murphy in the successful 1992 romantic comedy, Boomerang. In 1995, she was regular cast member during the first season of The WB sitcom, The Wayans Bros.

=== Breakthrough ===
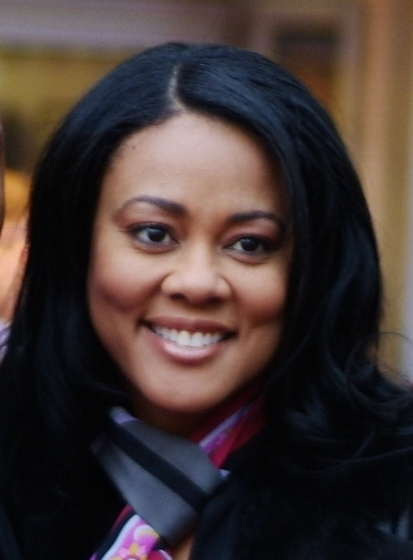
Rochon in 2010

In 1995, Rochon landed one of the lead roles opposite Whitney Houston, Angela Bassett and Loretta Devine in the adaptation of the Terry McMillan novel and highly successful drama film Waiting to Exhale. She played the character Robin Stokes, for which she was nominated for an MTV Movie Award for Best Breakthrough Performance and NAACP Image Award for Outstanding Supporting Actress in a Motion Picture. In 1996, Rochon starred opposite Timothy Hutton in the Showtime cable network film Mr. and Mrs. Loving, receiving a Cable Ace Award nomination for Best Actress. Later that year, she played the female lead in the crime thriller film The Chamber. The following year, she starred alongside Jim Belushi and Tupac Shakur in the crime thriller Gang Related. In 1998, Rochon had the leading role alongside Halle Berry and Vivica A. Fox in the romantic drama Why Do Fools Fall in Love, and well starred in Knock Off with Jean-Claude Van Damme, and The Big Hit, as love interest to Mark Wahlberg's leading character. In 1999, she appeared in Any Given Sunday directed by Oliver Stone. In 2001, Rochon made her return to television with one of leading roles alongside Bonnie Bedelia, Nancy McKeon, Tracey Needham, and Lisa Vidal in the Lifetime crime drama series, The Division. She left the series after a single season.

=== 2000s-present ===
In 2004, Rochon co-starred opposite Katie Holmes in the romantic comedy film First Daughter. In 2009, she had cameo in crime drama Brooklyn's Finest directed by her husband, Antoine Fuqua. In 2013, she played one of leading roles in Regina King's directorial debut Let The Church Say Amen, the film adaptation of ReShonda Tate Billingsley's 2005 novel for BET. She later had roles in films Supremacy (2014) with Danny Glover and Derek Luke, and Reversion (2015), playing Aja Naomi King's character's mother. In 2017, she had a recurring role in the CBS crime drama series Training Day, and in 2019 on the Oprah Winfrey Network drama David Makes Man.

In 2024, Rochon was cast in the leading role in the BET+ crime family drama series, The Family Business: New Orleans as Big Shirley Duncan.

== Personal life ==
Rochon has been married twice and has two children. Her first marriage to dancer and actor Adolfo Quiñones, better known as Shabba Doo, lasted from 1982 until 1987. In 1999, she married film director Antoine Fuqua. Together, they have a daughter, Asia Rochon Fuqua, and a son named Brando Fuqua. Rochon suffered a miscarriage in 2001.

== Filmography ==
=== Film ===
Year	Title	Role	Notes
1984	Breakin'	Extra in First Scene	
1984	Breakin' 2: Electric Boogaloo	Dancer	
1985	A Bunny's Tale	Charlotte	TV movie
1986	Foxtrap	Lindy	
1986	Stewardess School	School Instructor	
1987	The Wild Pair	Debby	
1987	Into the Homeland	Exquisite Woman	TV movie
1989	Harlem Nights	Sunshine	
1992	Boomerang	Christie	
1993	The Meteor Man	Vanessa	
1995	Waiting to Exhale	Robin Stokes	
1996	Mr. and Mrs. Loving	Mildred 'Bean' Jeter	TV movie
1996	The Chamber	Nora Stark	
1997	Gang Related	Cynthia Webb	
1997	Legal Deceit	Sydney Banks	
1998	Ruby Bridges	Lucielle 'Lucy' Bridges	TV movie
1998	The Big Hit	Chantel	
1998	Knock Off	Karen Lee	
1998	Why Do Fools Fall in Love	Emira Eagle	
1999	Any Given Sunday	Vanessa Struthers	
1999	The Charlotte Austin Story	Charlotte Austin	TV movie
2000	Labor Pains	Lulu Brown	
2004	First Daughter	Liz Pappas	
2006	Running Out of Time in Hollywood	-	
2009	Balancing the Books	Sharlene	
2009	Brooklyn's Finest	Investigator #1	
2010	Blood Done Sign My Name	Roseanna Allen	
2013	Let the Church Say Amen	Loretta Jackson	TV movie
2014	Supremacy	Odessa	
2015	Reversion	Maya	
2024	Terry McMillan Presents: Tempted by Love	Deena	TV movie
2026	Terry McMillan Presents: Tempted 2 Love	Deena	TV movie
2026	The Dating App Killer: The Monica White Story	Monica White	TV movie

=== Television ===
Year	Title	Role	Notes
1987	The Facts of Life	Diana	Episode: "The Greek Connection"
1987	The Cosby Show	Veronica	Episode: "The Shower"
1987	What's Happening Now!!	Sharona	Episode: "The Hat Comes Back"
1988	Amen	Young Bride	Episode: "Wedding Bell Blues"
1990	21 Jump Street	Denise Price	Episode: "Change of Heart"
1990	227	Leslie	Episode: "Gone Fishing"
1990	1st & Ten	Joy Brock	Episode: "Don't Powerburst My Bubble"
1991	Generations	Brandy Alexander	Recurring Cast: Season 3
1991	The Fresh Prince of Bel-Air	Cindy	Episode: "Will Gets a Job"
1991	Extralarge	Wendy	Episode: "Black & White"
1992	Homefront	Mary Louise	Episode: "At Your Age"
1992	Roc	Carol	Episode: "Roc Throws Joey Out"
1992	Tales from the Crypt	Mercedes	Episode: "Werewolf Concerto"
1992	Hangin' with Mr. Cooper	Paula	Episode: "On the Rebound"
1993	Out All Night	Victoria	Episode: "Mall in the Family"
1993	The Sinbad Show	Denise	Episode: "Pilot"
1994	Hangin' with Mr. Cooper	Denise	Episode: "The Courtship of Mark Cooper"
1995	The Wayans Bros.	Lisa	Main Cast: Season 1
1997	The Outer Limits	Beth Carter	Episode: "The Awakening"
1999-01	Intimate Portrait	Herself	Recurring Guest
2001	The Division	Inspector Angela Reid	Main Cast: Season 1
2011	Reed Between the Lines	Sherri	Episode: "Let's Talk About Affairs"
2016	Unsung Hollywood	Herself	Episode: "Vanessa Bell Calloway"
2017	Training Day	Mrs. Craig	Recurring Cast
2018	Meet the Peetes	Herself	Episode: "Let's Dance"
2018	Alone Together	Rose	Episode: "Dinner Party"
2019	David Makes Man	Alma	Recurring Cast: Season 1
2021	Insecure	Jackie	Episode: "Pressure, Okay?!"
2022	Family Reunion	Dr. Turner	Episode: "Remember Stompin' the Yard?"
2024	Black Comedy in America	Herself	Episode: "Eddie Murphy In The 80s"
2025	The Family Business: New Orleans	Big Shirley Duncan	Main Cast

=== Music Videos ===
Year	Song	Artist
1983	"All Night Long (All Night)"	Lionel Richie
1985	"It's Over Now"	Luther Vandross
1986	"Harlem Shuffle"	The Rolling Stones
1987	"My Forever Love"	LeVert

== Awards and nominations ==
Year	Awards	Category	Movie/Serie	Outcome
1996	MTV Movie Award	MTV Movie Award for Best Breakthrough Performance	"Waiting to Exhale"	Nominated
1996	NAACP Image Awards	NAACP Image Award for Outstanding Supporting Actress in a Motion Picture	"Waiting to Exhale"	Nominated
1997	CableACE Award	CableACE Award for Outstanding Actress in a Movie or Miniseries	"Mr. and Mrs. Loving"	Nominated
