= A Bunny's Tale =

1985 American television biopic about feminist journalist Gloria Steinem

- Genre: Biography comedy-drama
- Written by: Deena Goldstone; Lynn Roth
- Directed by: Karen Arthur
- Starring: Kirstie Alley
- Theme music composer: Paul Chihara
- Country of origin: United States
- Original language: English

Production
- Producers: Stan Margulies; Joan Marks; Janette M. Webb
- Cinematography: Gayne Rescher
- Editor: Millie Moore
- Running time: 104 minutes
- Production company: ABC Circle Films

Original release
- Network: ABC
- Release: February 25, 1985

A Bunny's Tale is a 1985 American made-for-television comedy-drama based on American feminist icon and journalist Gloria Steinem's experiences working as a Playboy Bunny in 1963, as described by her 1963 article "A Bunny's Tale" (published in Show magazine in two parts).

It stars Kirstie Alley as Steinem.

== Plot ==
Engaged by a magazine to write an investigative article on publisher Hugh Hefner's nightclub chain, Steinem poses as a young woman named "Marie" and enters the Bunny training program at the New York City Playboy Club. Outfitted with phony ears, a fuzzy tail, and a revealing costume, she learns the proper method of serving drinks, the "bunny dip", and how to fend off customers who ignore Hefner's "look but don't touch" policy.

As she navigates her new reality, Steinem witnesses the financial struggles, vulnerability, and lack of dignity experienced by the women working as Bunnies. She observes firsthand the exploitative nature of their employment, which includes low wages, tip sharing by the club, mandatory fees for costume upkeep, and a culture that reduces them to sexual objects, even as the club attempts to maintain a chaste image.

Through her undercover assignment, Steinem experiences an "awakening" to the complexities of gender roles and the exploitation hidden beneath the façade of the "glamorous" Playboy lifestyle. The film also features a dramatic subplot involving her boyfriend, who expresses friction and crisis upon learning about her secret life as a Playboy Bunny. Ultimately, the experience provides Steinem with the material and personal conviction that would help launch her career as a powerful voice for feminism.

== Cast ==
- Kirstie Alley as Gloria Steinem
- Cotter Smith as Ned Holcomb
- Deborah Van Valkenburgh as Pearl
- Joanna Kerns as Andrea
- Lisa Pelikan as Lee
- Delta Burke as Margie
- Mary Woronov as Miss Renfro
- Diana Scarwid as Toby
- Romy Windsor as Bobbi
- Randi Brooks as Marybeth
- Dee Dee Rescher as Hazel
- Chick Vennera as Frankie
- Stanley Kamel as Jerry
- James T. Callahan as Phil
- Katie Budge as Gwen
- Madison Mason as Luther Baines
- Lela Rochon as Charlotte
- Chanelle Lee as Sherry
- Charles Winters as Greg
- Randy Hamilton as David
- Richard Lefevre as Willie
- Keith Mills as Doctor
- Teddy Wilson as Older Club Employee (credited as Theodore Wilson)
- Patricia Ayame Thomson as Playboy Bunny (credited as Patricia Thomson)
