= Nnamdi Asomugha =

African - American football player and actor (born 1981)

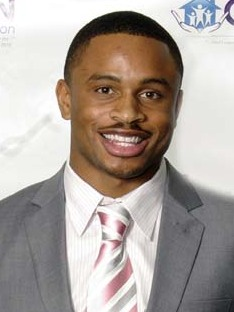
- Asomugha in 2009

No. 21, 24, 28
- Position: Cornerback

Personal information
- Born: July 6, 1981 (age 45); Lafayette, Louisiana, U.S.
- Listed height: 6 ft 2 in (1.88 m)
- Listed weight: 210 lb (95 kg)

Career information
- High school: Narbonne (Harbor City, California)
- College: California (1999–2002)
- NFL draft: 2003: 1st round, 31st overall pick

Career history
- Oakland Raiders (2003–2010); Philadelphia Eagles (2011–2012); San Francisco 49ers (2013)

Awards and highlights
- 2× First-team All-Pro (2008, 2010); 2× Second-team All-Pro (2006, 2009); 3× Pro Bowl (2008–2010); "Whizzer" White NFL Man of the Year (2009)

Career NFL statistics
- Total tackles: 407
- Sacks: 2
- Forced fumbles: 2
- Pass deflections: 80
- Interceptions: 15
- Defensive touchdowns: 1
- Stats at Pro Football Reference

Nnamdi Asomugha (born July 6, 1981) is a Nigerian-American actor, director, producer, and former professional football cornerback. He played 11 seasons in the National Football League (NFL) with the Oakland Raiders, Philadelphia Eagles, and San Francisco 49ers. He played college football for UC Berkeley, and was selected by the Raiders in the first round of the 2003 NFL draft. For several years, he was considered one of the best shutdown cornerbacks in the NFL. In his 11-year career, he was voted All-Pro four times, including twice to the first team. Asomugha was selected as a member of Fox Sports's NFL All-Decade Team 2000–2009 and USA Today's NFL All-Decade Team 2000s, and is considered one of the greatest Raiders of all time.

Asomugha received critical acclaim for his portrayal of Carl King in the film Crown Heights (2017). He was nominated for an Independent Spirit Award for Best Supporting Male and he was nominated for an NAACP Image Award for Outstanding Supporting Actor in a Motion Picture. Variety named him one of the seven breakout performers of 2017.

Asomugha made his Broadway debut in the Pulitzer Prize-winning play A Soldier's Play (2020) as Private First Class Melvin Peterson, a role originated Off-Broadway by Denzel Washington. Later that year, the production won the Tony Award for Best Revival of a Play.

Asomugha received his first Emmy nomination when Sylvie’s Love (2020)—which he produced and starred in—was nominated for Outstanding Television Movie at the Primetime Emmy Awards. That same year, Variety named him one of its '10 Producers to Watch.'

== Early life and education ==
Nnamdi Asomugha was born in Lafayette, Louisiana, to Nigerian Igbo parents. His childhood was spent making numerous trips to Nigeria. He was raised in Los Angeles, California. He attended Leuzinger High School in Lawndale, California, and Bishop Montgomery High School in Torrance, California, before transferring to and from Narbonne High School in Harbor City, California, playing high school basketball and football.

== College career ==
Asomugha attended the University of California, Berkeley, where he played for the California Golden Bears football team. He finished his career with 187 tackles, three sacks, 19 stops for losses, eight interceptions, three touchdowns, 15 pass deflections, two fumble recoveries and a forced fumble in 41 games as a free safety. Asomugha graduated with a Bachelor of Science in Business Administration.

== Professional career ==
He was drafted in the first round of the 2003 NFL Draft by the Oakland Raiders, where he spent eight seasons. He later played for the Philadelphia Eagles and the San Francisco 49ers before retiring at the end of the 2013–2014 season.

Pre-draft measurables
Height	Weight	Arm length	Hand span	40-yard dash	10-yard split	20-yard split	Vertical jump	Broad jump	Bench press
6 ft 2 3/8 in (1.89 m)	213 lb (97 kg)	32 1/4 in (0.82 m)	9 5/8 in (0.24 m)	4.45 s	1.60 s	2.66 s	37.5 in (0.95 m)	10 ft 4 in (3.15 m)	16 reps
All values from NFL Combine

=== Oakland Raiders ===
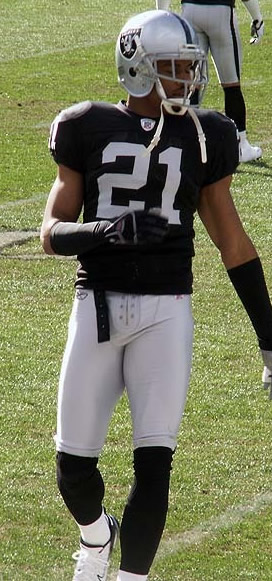
Asomugha, pictured here in 2007, played for the Oakland Raiders from 2003 through 2010.

Asomugha was selected by the Oakland Raiders in the first round, with the 31st overall pick, of the 2003 NFL draft. He was the second Cal player drafted in the first round that year. He was moved to cornerback but played sparingly the first two seasons of his career. He became a starter in 2005 and set new highs in tackles with 60 tackles (55 solo) and passes broken up with 14.

In 2006, he recorded his first two career interceptions against the Cleveland Browns. He got his third interception four weeks later against the Pittsburgh Steelers and returned it 24 yards for the first touchdown of his career. Though the team suffered through a 2–14 season, Asomugha's 2006 campaign was his finest yet as he finished the season with 50 tackles (48 solo), eight interceptions, a sack, a forced fumble and one touchdown. His interception total tied him for second highest total in the National Football League along with four other players (including former Oakland Raiders cornerback Charles Woodson). After the season, Asomugha was invited to the Pro Bowl as an alternate but because of late notice he was not able to attend the annual all-star game. He also received the Oakland Raiders "Commitment to Excellence" Award and was named the team's Most Valuable Player. In addition, Asomugha was selected to Dr. Z Sports Illustrated 2006 All-Pro team as well as The Associated Press 2006 All-Pro Team.

Asomugha was selected as the Raiders Team Captain for the 2007 season. Opposing quarterbacks tested him only 31 times with a mere 10 completions the entire season. One NFL scout told Pro Football Weekly that Asomugha was thrown at "less than any defender in the last ten years" in 2007. He finished the 2007 season with 34 tackles (32 solo), 1 interception and 7 breakups and was named a 2008 Pro Bowl alternate.

A free agent in the 2008 offseason, the Raiders placed the exclusive franchise tag on Asomugha on February 20, 2008.

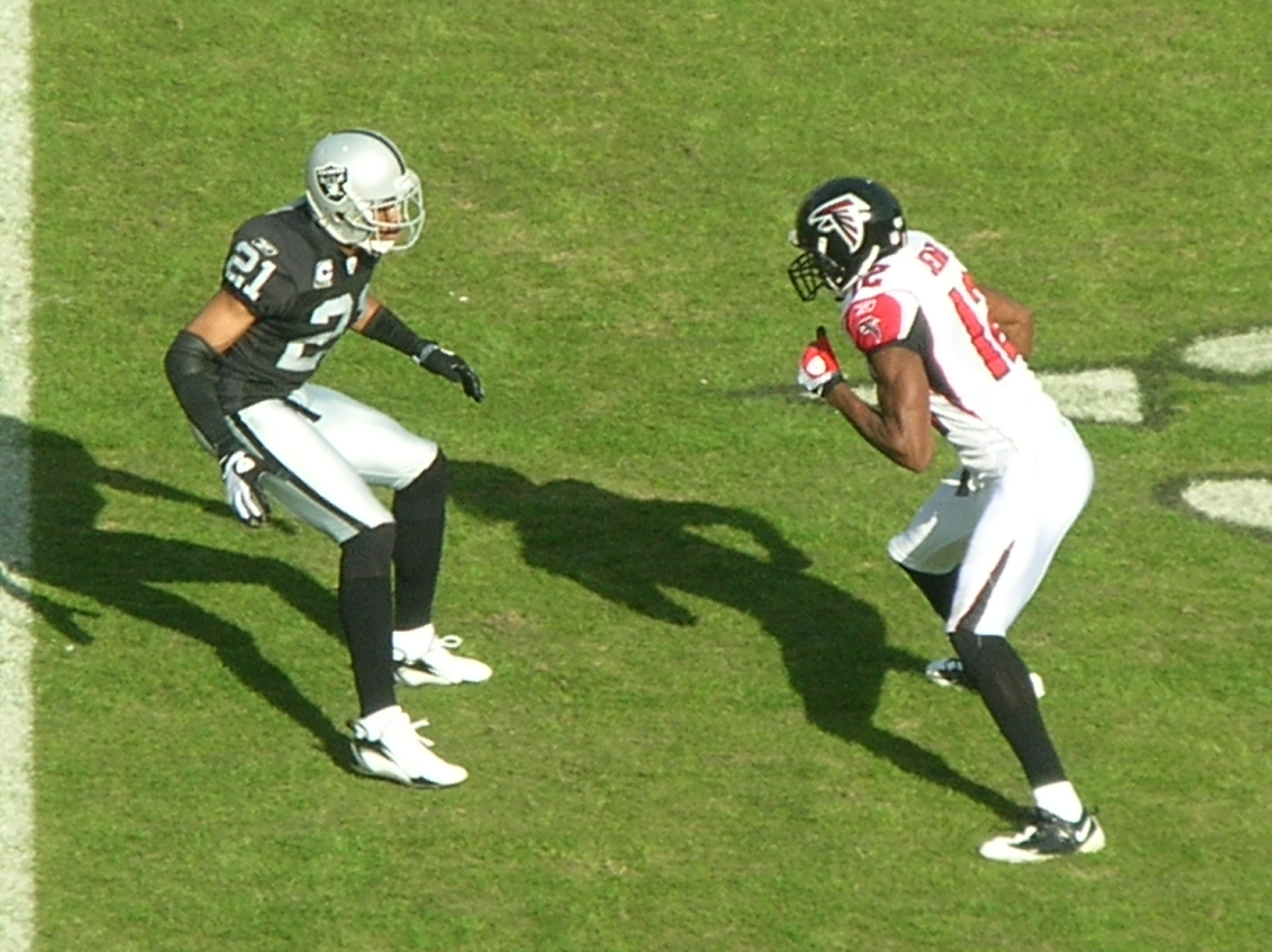
Asomugha covers Atlanta Falcons wide receiver Michael Jenkins at a home game on November 2, 2008.

Asomugha was again selected a team captain before the 2008 season. Opposing quarterbacks tested him only 27 times the entire season resulting in just 8 completions. Only perennial all-pros Randy Moss (3 receptions, 40 yards) and Tony Gonzalez (2 receptions, 34 yards) would catch more than one ball on him during the year. New England Patriots head coach Bill Belichick said Asomugha is "as complete a cornerback as he has seen all year". He finished the 2008 season with 40 tackles, 1 interception, 1 forced fumble, and 9 pass deflections. He received the Oakland Raiders "Commitment to Excellence" Award for the second time and was named the team's 2008 Co-Most Valuable Player along with running back Justin Fargas. Asomugha was selected as a starter for the 2009 Pro Bowl. He was selected onto The Sporting News 2008 All-Pro Team as well as the Pro Football Writers Association All-NFL Team for 2008. Asomugha was also selected onto Peter King's Sports Illustrated 2008 All-Pro team as well as The Associated Press 2008 All-Pro Team.

On February 19, 2009, the Raiders re-signed Asomugha to a complex three-year deal that made him the highest-paid defensive back in NFL history. The first two years, worth $28.5 million, were fully guaranteed. In the third year of the contract, if Oakland wanted to keep Asomugha, it had to pay him the average of the top five highest-paid cornerbacks or $16.875 million, whichever was higher. If the Raiders failed to pick up the option, Asomugha became a free agent with Oakland not having the ability to tag him again.

In August 2009 the Oakland Tribune named Asomugha one of the greatest Oakland Raiders of all time.

A team captain again in 2009 and the NFL's least targeted cornerback by an extremely wide margin, Asomugha was challenged by opposing quarterbacks only 27 times and allowed 13 completions the entire season. After his performance against the Houston Texans, head coach Gary Kubiak said "Asomugha is the best (corner) I've seen in a while throughout this league. He's big, he's fast, they put him out there on an island the whole game. He's an exceptional player." Similar to the past three seasons, Asomugha finished the 2009 season with 34 tackles, 1 interception, and was second in the league with 8 tackles for loss from the cornerback position. Cleveland Browns defensive coordinator Rob Ryan said "The guy is truly unbelievable. He made himself the best corner in football by his work ethic, the way he studies tape, and he's so smart."

Following the 2009 season, Asomugha was selected as a starter for the 2010 Pro Bowl. Asomugha was selected onto The Sporting News 2009 All-Pro Team (2nd team) as well as The Associated Press 2009 All-Pro Team (2nd team). This would mark his third selection to both the Pro Bowl and All-Pro team in his seven-year career with the Oakland Raiders.

In 2010, Asomugha was selected as a member of the Fox Sports' and USA Today's NFL All-Decade Team.

The shutdown corner lived up to his title once again in the 2010 season. While shadowing the opposing teams' top receiver most of the season, Asomugha was still targeted much less than any other cornerback in the NFL. Asomugha allowed just 10 receptions on the 27 passes thrown his way. Most important, Asomugha did not give up a touchdown all year. "He has extraordinary speed – great speed," Seahawks coach Pete Carroll said. "He's exactly what you're looking for in a press corner and about as good as you could hope a guy to be." When facing the Arizona Cardinals, All-Pro wide receiver Larry Fitzgerald said "The thing you see on tape for a man of his size, he has incredible hips and amazingly quick feet, and that's just God given ability to be that tall and be able to move and cut and drive on balls the way he's able to." Following the 2010 season, Asomugha was selected as a starter for the 2011 Pro Bowl. Asomugha was selected onto ESPN John Clayton's 2010 All-Pro Team as well as Peter King's Sports Illustrated 2010 All-Pro team. Asomugha was also selected to the prestigious Associated Press 2010 All-Pro Team, his fourth selection as an All-Pro. He was ranked 18th by his fellow players on the NFL Top 100 Players of 2011.

=== Philadelphia Eagles ===
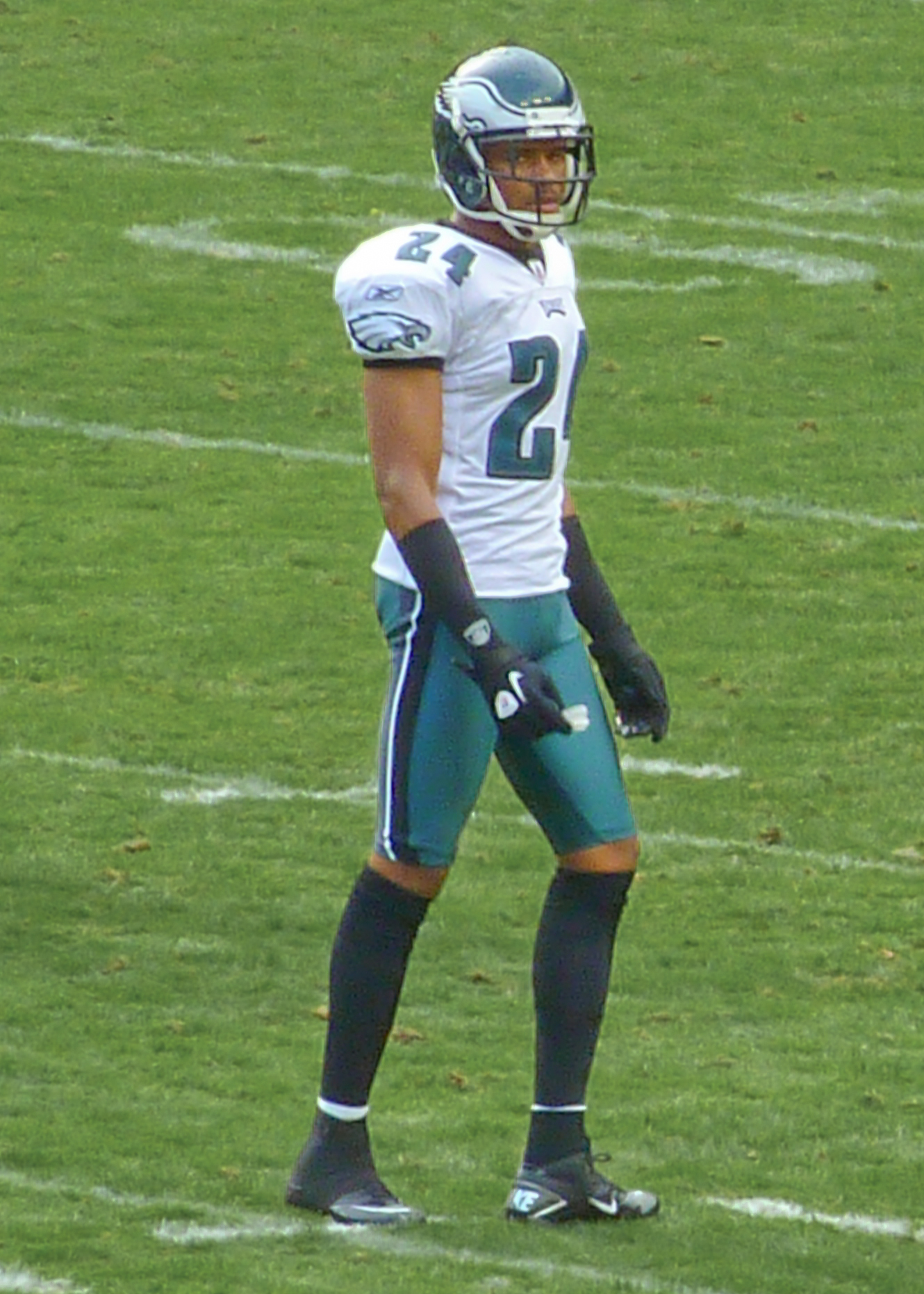
Asomugha with the Eagles in 2011

Entering the 2011 season, Asomugha was regarded as the top free agent available on the market. On July 29, 2011, Asomugha agreed to a five-year, $60 million deal, and at least $25 million guaranteed, contract with the Philadelphia Eagles.

In 2011, he finished the season with 40 total tackles, 5 passes defended, and 3 interceptions. Asomugha was named a 2012 Pro Bowl alternate.

During his time in Philadelphia, the team struggled to a 12–20 record, missing the playoffs both years. Asomugha was eventually released by the team at the end of the 2012 season after he was unable to agree to a restructured deal with the team.

=== San Francisco 49ers ===
On April 2, 2013, Asomugha signed a one-year deal with the San Francisco 49ers, under which he would earn a base salary of $1.35 million and with a chance to earn up to an additional $1.65 million in incentives. On November 4, 2013, Asomugha was waived by the team.

=== Retirement ===
On December 26, 2013, Asomugha signed a one-day contract with Oakland so he could retire as a Raider. He officially announced his retirement on December 27, 2013.

In 2016, Pro Football Focus named Asomugha the best Oakland Raiders player of the past decade.

== NFL career statistics ==
Legend
**Bold**	Career high

Year	Team	Games		Tackles					Interceptions					Fumbles			
Year	Team	GP	GS	Cmb	Solo	Ast	Sck	TFL	Int	Yds	TD	Lng	PD	FF	FR	Yds	TD
2003	OAK	15	1	28	20	**8**	0.0	0	0	0	0	0	0	0	**1**	0	0
2004	OAK	**16**	7	45	37	**8**	**1.0**	1	0	0	0	0	3	0	0	0	0
2005	OAK	**16**	**16**	**60**	**55**	5	0.0	2	0	0	0	0	14	0	0	0	0
2006	OAK	15	15	51	48	3	**1.0**	3	**8**	**59**	**1**	**24**	**19**	**1**	0	0	0
2007	OAK	15	15	34	32	2	0.0	1	1	10	0	10	7	0	0	0	0
2008	OAK	15	15	40	33	7	0.0	3	1	0	0	0	9	**1**	0	0	0
2009	OAK	**16**	**16**	34	30	4	0.0	**8**	1	0	0	0	3	0	0	0	0
2010	OAK	14	14	19	17	2	0.0	0	0	0	0	0	6	0	0	0	0
2011	PHI	**16**	15	40	35	5	0.0	4	3	10	0	6	5	0	0	0	0
2012	PHI	**16**	**16**	55	47	**8**	0.0	2	1	0	0	0	12	0	0	0	0
2013	SFO	3	1	2	2	0	0.0	0	0	0	0	0	1	0	0	0	0
Career		157	131	408	356	52	2.0	24	15	79	1	24	79	2	1	0	0

== Media career ==
Asomugha's first onscreen role was on The CW sitcom The Game, followed by roles in other television series, including Friday Night Lights and the TNT drama Leverage. He also appeared in Will Ferrell's comedy web series Funny or Die (2012) and the Roadside Attractions film Hello, My Name Is Doris (2015).

In 2014, Asomugha worked as an executive producer on the Netflix film Beasts of No Nation. The film premiered at the 72nd Venice International Film Festival and was a critical success, garnering numerous awards that year, including a nomination for Best Feature at the 2016 Film Independent Spirit Awards.

Asomugha's breakout performance came when he produced and starred in the Amazon Studios film Crown Heights. The film premiered in competition in the US Dramatic Category at the Sundance Film Festival on January 23, 2017, where it received favorable reviews and won the Audience Award for U.S. Dramatic Film. Following its success, Asomugha was widely regarded as one of the breakout actors of the 2017 Sundance Film Festival, with Jenelle Riley of Variety calling his performance "simply astounding." He was later nominated for Best Supporting Actor at the 2018 Film Independent Spirit Awards, as well as Outstanding Supporting Actor in a Motion Picture at the NAACP Image Awards.

Asomugha made his stage debut in the Off-Broadway play Good Grief (2018) at the Vineyard Theatre. The play was named a New York Times Critic's Pick, and Sara Holdren of New York Magazine praised Asomugha's performance as "excellent."

Asomugha has served as a producer or executive producer on several film and theatre projects, including the Focus Features film Harriet (2019), the Apple Studios film The Banker (2020), and the Amazon Studios film Nanny (2022), which won the Grand Jury Prize at the 2022 Sundance Film Festival. He has also produced for theatre, including the Broadway plays American Son (2018) and Purlie Victorious (2023), which was nominated for the Tony Award for Best Revival of a Play.

In 2020, Asomugha received critical acclaim for his Broadway debut in the Pulitzer Prize-winning play A Soldier's Play, portraying Private First Class Melvin Peterson, a role originally performed off-Broadway by Denzel Washington. Jesse Green of The New York Times praised his standout performance as "excellent," while David Rooney of The Hollywood Reporter declared it a "promising Broadway debut." The production went on to receive seven Tony Award nominations, winning Best Revival of a Play.

Also in 2020, Asomugha produced and starred alongside Tessa Thompson in the Amazon Studios romantic drama Sylvie's Love. Both Asomugha and the film received high praise from critics after premiering at the 2020 Sundance Film Festival. In his review, Vince Mancini of Uproxx wrote, "It's a rare wonder to find out that an ex-athlete is both an actor and a great actor at the same time." Benjamin Lee of The Guardian praised the chemistry between Thompson and Asomugha, calling it "a genuine, pulse-quickening connection that's impossible to feign and rare to witness." Asomugha went on to receive an NAACP Image Award nomination for Outstanding Actor in a Television Movie, Limited Series, or Dramatic Special. The following year, he earned his first Primetime Emmy Award nomination as a producer when Sylvie's Love was nominated for Outstanding Television Movie.

In 2022, Asomugha starred opposite Eddie Redmayne and Jessica Chastain in the Netflix thriller The Good Nurse. The film premiered at the Toronto International Film Festival to generally favorable reviews. On February 2, 2024, Deadline announced that Asomugha and Chastain would reunite on the Apple TV+ thriller miniseries The Savant, inspired by the true story of a top-secret investigator who infiltrates online hate groups.

On January 18, 2022, Deadline announced that Asomugha would make his directorial debut with the feature film The Knife, from a script he co-wrote with Mark Duplass. In addition to directing, he would also star alongside Academy Award-winning actress Melissa Leo, Aja Naomi King, and Manny Jacinto. The film premiered in competition at the Tribeca Film Festival on June 9, 2024, receiving high critical praise and rave reviews. Many critics cited it as a "remarkable and powerful directing debut," while also lauding the "strong and poignant performances" from the ensemble cast. Film critic Will Bjarnar, in his review for Next Best Picture, said that "the film was as engaging a work of suspense as I've seen this year." Lovia Gyarkye, a critic for The Hollywood Reporter, highlighted the film's "chilling and visceral frankness," calling it "not just a story of horror, but of heartbreak."

Asomugha won the Tribeca Film Festival Award for Best New Narrative Director, and The Knife was nominated for the Founders Award for Best U.S. Narrative Feature. The film had its European premiere on September 11, 2024, at the Deauville American Film Festival, where it won the Jury Prize and was nominated for the festival's Grand Prix.

On November 4, 2024, Asomugha was honored with the Breakthrough Director Award at the Denver Film Festival.

== Filmography ==
=== Film ===
Year	Title	Role	Notes
2012	Fire with Fire	Sherrod	Feature film debut
2015	Beasts of No Nation	—N/a	Executive producer
2015	Hello, My Name Is Doris	Shaka	
2017	Crown Heights	Carl King	Also producer
2019	Harriet	—N/a	Executive producer
2020	Sylvie's Love	Robert	Also producer
2020	The Banker	—N/a	Producer
2022	Nanny	—N/a	Executive producer
2022	The Good Nurse	Danny Baldwin	
2024	The Knife	Chris	Also director/co-writer
TBA	2034 †	TBA	Post-production

=== Television ===
Year	Title	Role	Notes
2008	The Game	Party Guest	Episode: "The List"
2009	Friday Night Lights	Ken Shaw	Episode: "East of Dillon"
2010	Leverage	Walle	Episode: "The Scheherazade Job"
2013	Kroll Show	Himself	Episode: "Please God"
2020	When the Streetlights Go On	Adult Charlie Chambers	10 episodes
2026	The Body	Father Franklin	Post-production; main role
2027	The Savant	Charlie Goodwin	Upcoming miniseries

== Theatre ==
Year	Title	Role	Notes
2018	Good Grief	Bro	Vineyard Theatre, Off-Broadway
2018	American Son	—N/a	Booth Theatre, Broadway; Producer
2020	A Soldier's Play	Private First Class Melvin Peterson	American Airlines Theatre, Broadway
2023	Purlie Victorious	—N/a	Music Box Theatre, Broadway; Producer

== Awards and nominations ==
Year	Award	Category	Work/Recipient(s)	Result	Ref.
2017	Sundance Film Festival	Audience Award - U.S. Dramatic	Crown Heights	Won	
2018	Independent Spirit Awards	Best Supporting Male	Crown Heights	Nominated	
2018	NAACP Image Awards	Outstanding Supporting Actor in a Motion Picture	Crown Heights	Nominated	
2021	NAACP Image Awards	Outstanding Actor in a Television Movie, Limited-Series or Dramatic Special	Sylvie's Love	Nominated	
2021	NAACP Image Awards	Outstanding Television Movie, Limited-Series or Dramatic Special	Sylvie's Love	Nominated	
2017	African-American Film Critics Association	Best Independent Film	Crown Heights	Won	
2017	African-American Film Critics Association	Top Ten Films of the Year	Crown Heights	Won	
2021	African-American Film Critics Association	Best Television Movie	Sylvie's Love	Won	
2021	Primetime Emmy Awards	Outstanding Television Movie	Sylvie's Love	Nominated	
2018	Black Reel Awards	Outstanding Breakthrough Performance, Male	Crown Heights	Nominated	
2018	Black Reel Awards	Outstanding Independent Feature	Crown Heights	Won	
2021	Black Reel Awards	Outstanding Actor, TV Movie or Limited Series	Sylvie's Love	Nominated	
2021	Black Reel Awards	Outstanding Television Movie or Limited Series	Sylvie's Love	Nominated	
2021	Critics' Choice Awards	Best Movie Made for Television	Sylvie's Love	Nominated	
2024	Denver Film Festival	Breakthrough Director Award	The Knife	Won	
2024	Tribeca Film Festival	Best New Narrative Director	The Knife	Won	
2024	Tribeca Film Festival	Founders Award for Best U.S. Narrative Feature	The Knife	Nominated	
2024	Deauville American Film Festival	Jury Prize	The Knife	Won	

== Philanthropy ==
Asomugha serves as Chairman for the Asomugha Foundation. The Asomugha Foundation operates two primary programs: Orphans and Widows In Need (OWIN) and Asomugha College Tour for Scholars (ACTS).

Through OWIN, Asomugha and his family provide food, shelter, medicine, vocational training, literacy efforts, and scholarships to widows and orphans victimized by poverty or abuse in Nigeria. Currently, OWIN has two centers in Nigeria and plans to expand to other countries in Africa.

In 2006, Asomugha launched the annual ACTS program. Each year, he teams up with selected students from Bay Area and Los Angeles Area high schools on college tours across the country. One of the organizations he partnered with is the East Oakland Youth Development Center, a 501(c)(3) non-profit organization in Oakland, California. In the first two years, Asomugha took students to visit Morehouse College, Spelman College, Georgia Institute of Technology, Clark Atlanta University, Harvard University, Massachusetts Institute of Technology, Boston University, Brown University and the Berklee College of Music. For the 2009 tour, Asomugha took students to visit schools in New York City including NYU, Columbia University, The Juilliard School, The Fashion Institute of Technology, Fordham University and The New School. In 2010, ACTS expanded to not only service high school students in the Bay Area but also select high schools in the Los Angeles area. For the 2010 tour, ACTS visited schools in Washington D.C. including Georgetown University, George Washington University, American University, Howard University and University of Maryland. In 2011, ACTS traveled to New Orleans, LA. The campuses visited were Loyola University, Xavier University of Louisiana, Southern University, Tulane University and Louisiana State University. All of the tour participants who have graduated from high school have gone on to attend higher education institutions.

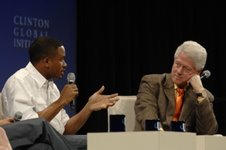
Asomugha speaking about the importance of community service at the Clinton Global Initiative University 2009 meeting in Austin, Texas with former President Bill Clinton.

Additionally, Asomugha distributes backpacks to the incoming freshmen each year at Narbonne High School in Los Angeles. He also outfits the football and basketball team with shoes, a mandate he wrote into an endorsement contract he signed with Nike.

== Honors ==
- For his commitment to community service, Asomugha was named a Home Depot Neighborhood MVP 2007
- In 2008, Asomugha was presented with The President's Volunteer Service Award, an award that was established to recognize the important contributions Americans of all ages are making within their communities through service and civic engagement.
- Asomugha has been recognized by fellow members of the NFL Players Association who nominated him in 2005, 2006, 2007, 2008 and 2009 for the Byron "Whizzer" White Award for Outstanding Community Service. In 2010, Asomugha was presented with the 44th annual Byron "Whizzer" White NFL Man of the Year, the NFL Players Association's (NFLPA) highest honor
- Asomugha was also nominated for the prestigious Sports Illustrated 2008 Sportsman of the Year award.
- In 2009, Asomugha was named to the "Dream Team for Public Service" by the Jefferson Awards for Public Service.
- In 2010, Asomugha became the ambassador for United Way of the Bay Area UWBA, dedicated to creating long-lasting change and ensuring all Bay Area residents have access to the building blocks to a better life: education, income and health.
- In 2011, Asomugha was named one of three finalists for the Walter Payton Man of the Year Award
- In 2012, Asomugha received the inaugural "Role Model of the Year" Award from the Congressionally chartered National Conference on Citizenship
- In 2016 He was voted Best Raider of the Past Decade by Pro Football Focus.
- In 2017, Asomugha was inducted into the California Interscholastic Federation (CIF-LA) High School Sports Hall of Fame.
- On September 20, 2019, Narbonne High School retired Asomugha's No. 2 football jersey, making him the first player in school history to receive the honor.

== Personal life ==
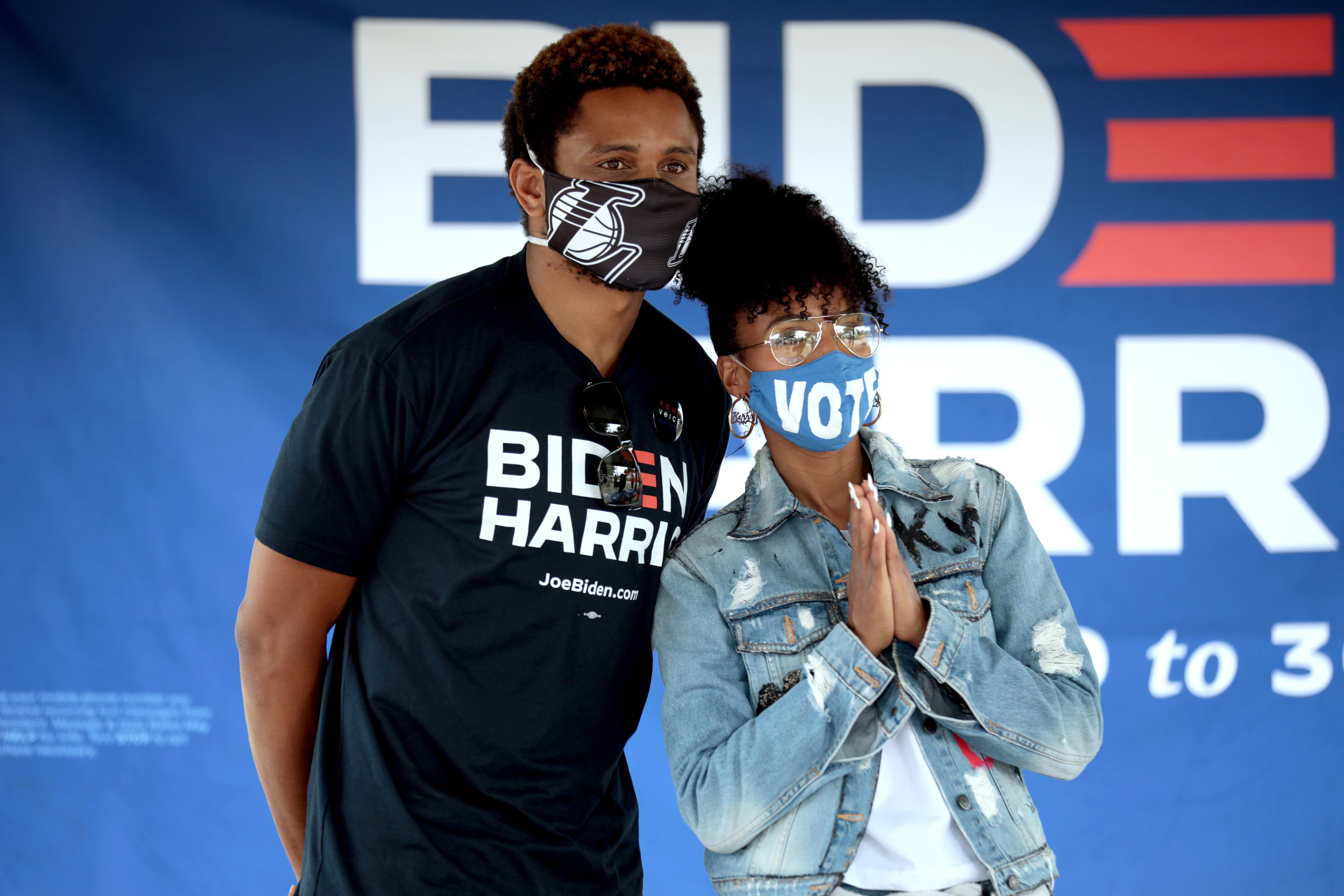
Asomugha (left) and wife Kerry Washington campaigning in October 2020 for Joe Biden

On June 24, 2013, Asomugha married actress Kerry Washington. The couple have two children. Asomugha also has a daughter from a previous relationship.

Asomugha has a form of color-blindness called deuteranomaly and stated in the June 2009 issue of ESPN The Magazine that "It was determined when I was about 7 years old. It's never really affected my play on the field — I can easily distinguish between light and dark colors. I only have trouble between similar colors — the light ones. They look the same to me. No problems on the field."

Asomugha is a member of Kappa Alpha Psi.
