= Female genital mutilation laws by country =

The legal status of female genital mutilation (FGM), also known as female genital cutting (FGC), differs widely across the world.

== Overview of issues ==
=== Geographic perspective ===
Some states in Somalia have banned Female Genital Mutilation. Specific criminal provision or national law prohibiting FGM General criminal provision that might be used to prosecute FGM Partial or subnational FGM criminalisation, or unclear legal status FGM not criminalised No data

FGM legislation by U.S. state: State law criminalises FGM. State law does not criminalise FGM.

In international law, there is a consensus that female genital mutilation is a human rights violation that needs to be criminalised and eradicated by all states. International human rights instruments to that effect include global and regional treaties, conventions, protocols, declarations, resolutions and recommendations such as CEDAW Committee General Recommendation No. 14 (1990), Maputo Protocol Article 5 (2003), the Cairo Declaration on the Elimination of FGM (CDEFGM, 2003), Istanbul Convention Article 38 (2011), Sustainable Development Goal 5.3 (2015), the East African Community Prohibition of Female Genital Mutilation Act (EAC Act, 2016) and United Nations Human Rights Council Resolution No. 38/61 (2018).

Global efforts to end FGM, including criminalisation, have long focused on Africa, where most countries that have traditionally practiced FGM are located and anti-FGM campaigns have been quite successful in the 1990s through 2010s, but have long under-appreciated traditionally FGM-practicing countries in Asia and immigrant communities in countries with no FGM tradition. A March 2020 report by End FGM European Network, U.S. End FGM/C Network and Equality Now found that FGM was practiced in at least 92 countries across all continents, while 51 of them had a law that specifically criminalised FGM.

FGM was illegal in 22 of the 28 most FGM-prevalent countries in Africa in September 2018. Sudan criminalised FGM in April 2020.

Some Western countries, where FGM has not been traditionally practiced but where immigrants from traditionally FGM-practicing countries have moved to in the 20th and 21st century, have also criminalised FGM (13 countries as of November 2008). By 2013, FGM had been criminalised in all 27 member states of the European Union (including the United Kingdom) and Croatia.

Despite international reports to the contrary, female genital mutilation has been explicitly criminalised in the Netherlands since 1 February 2006, namely in the then Articles 5.3 and 5a.1 of the Dutch Criminal Code (Wetboek van Strafrecht), and the statute of limitations was increased on 1 July 2009 by not starting until the day after the FGM victim's 18th birthday. As of 25 July 2020, genital mutilation of female persons under age 18 is punishable in the Netherlands, including when committed abroad by Dutch citizens, foreigners who later obtain Dutch citizenship or foreigners with a regular place of residence or stay in the Netherlands, as a form of (aggravated) assault (potentially premeditated) under Articles 300 to 303 per Article 7.d and Article 71.3 of the Dutch Criminal Code. (Note: "Artikel 7. 1. De Nederlandse strafwet is toepasselijk op de Nederlander die zich buiten Nederland schuldig maakt aan een feit dat door de Nederlandse strafwet als misdrijf wordt beschouwd en waarop door de wet van het land waar het begaan is, straf is gesteld. 2. De Nederlandse strafwet is voorts toepasselijk op de Nederlander die zich buiten Nederland schuldig maakt: (...) d. aan een van de misdrijven omschreven in de artikelen 300 tot en met 303, voor zover het feit oplevert genitale verminking van een persoon van het vrouwelijke geslacht die de leeftijd van achttien jaren nog niet heeft bereikt; (...). 3. Met een Nederlander wordt voor de toepassing van het eerste en het tweede lid, onder b tot en met e, gelijkgesteld de vreemdeling die na het plegen van het feit Nederlander wordt alsmede, voor de toepassing van het eerste en tweede lid, de vreemdeling die in Nederland een vaste woon- of verblijfplaats heeft." "Artikel 71. De termijn van verjaring vangt aan op de dag na die waarop het feit is gepleegd, behoudens in de volgende gevallen: (...) 3°. bij de misdrijven omschreven in (...) de artikelen 300 tot en met 303, voor zover het feit oplevert genitale verminking van een persoon van het vrouwelijke geslacht die de leeftijd van achttien jaren nog niet heeft bereikt (...).") The maximum punishment is 12 years imprisonment (or 15 years if the victim dies). The penalty can be increased by a third if the perpetrator(s) were/was (a) family member(s) or the life companion of the victim (Article 304.1) or if the victim was underage (Article 304.2).

In the United States, FGM was criminalised federally in 1996 and in 17/50 states during 1994–2006. However, the federal law criminalising FGM was declared unconstitutional by a Michigan court in November 2018, mostly because the judge found that the federal government did not have the authority to legislate on the issue, and that the U.S. states should. At the time of the ruling, 27 states had specifically criminalised FGM, and the court case stimulated the other states to do so as well, both during and after the trial. By March 2020, the practice was illegal in 35/50 states; by May 2020, FGM was banned in 38/50 U.S. states. On 5 January 2021, the STOP FGM Act of 2020 was enacted, which considers FGM 'a form of child abuse, gender discrimination, and violence', empowering federal authorities to prosecute people who 'carry out or conspire to carry out FGM' and increasing the maximum prison sentence from 5 to 10 years. This replaced the 1996 law that was declared unconstitutional in 2018. At the time of signing, 11 out of the 50 U.S. states still had no state ban on FGM. By August 2023, 41 states had specific laws against FGM.

=== Legal methods ===
The way in which legislation (and usually criminalisation) of FGM is enacted, differs from country to country. Some countries' constitutions ban FGM, others have adopted specific laws criminalising FGM, others have subsumed prohibitions on FGM in wider criminal legislation on either child protection, violence against women, sexual violence, or physical assault. In EU member states, there is a trend to criminalise FGM in specific rather than general criminal law provisions; by 2013, 10 states of 28 (including Croatia and the UK) had done so. By March 2020, Estonia, Germany, Malta and Portugal had also introduced explicit provisions criminalising FGM, so that 14 out of the current 27 EU Member States have specific anti-FGM legislation.

Indian Minister for Women and Child Development Maneka Gandhi said in 2017 that the 1860 Indian Penal Code, the 1973 Criminal Procedure Code and the 2012 Protection of Children from Sexual Offences Act (POCSO Act) could be invoked to prosecute FGM cases and that a specific law to criminalise FGM was not necessary.

=== Cross-border FGM and extraterritoriality ===
Sometimes FGM is performed across the border in a country where it is still legal in order to avoid prosecution in one's country of residence (for example, in Mali by Burkina Faso residents or in Somalia by Kenya residents). As of September 2018, Guinea Bissau, Kenya and Uganda were the only countries in Africa that criminalised and punished cross-border FGM. In the European Union, legislators have applied the legal principle of extraterritoriality to prosecute the practice of FGM when it is committed outside of a member state's territory to girls living in the EU who had been cut or are at risk of being cut in their or their parents' country of birth while on holidays or visits abroad.

== Laws by country ==
Country	Criminalised	Since	Notes
Australia	Specific criminal provision		Criminalised in 6/8 states during 1994–97 as of November 2008.
Austria	Specific criminal provision		Specific criminal law provision.
Bahrain	No		As of March 2020.
Belgium	Specific criminal provision	2000	Specific criminal law provision.
Benin	Specific anti-FGM law	2003	Specific national anti-FGM law which prohibits FGM.
Brunei	No		As of March 2020.
Bulgaria	General criminal provision		General criminal law provision.
Burkina Faso	Specific criminal provision	1996	Specific criminal law provision.
Cameroon	Specific criminal provision		As of September 2018.
Canada	Specific criminal provision	1997	Specific criminal law provision.
Central African Republic	Specific criminal provision	1966	As of September 2018.
Chad	No		A 2002 bill banning FGM has not yet been enacted as of March 2020.
Colombia	Specific criminal provision	2026	Some native tribes (Emberá, Arhuaco, Koguis) are known to practice FGM, but there is a law against it, enacted in August 2026.
Côte d'Ivoire	Specific criminal provision	1998	As of September 2018.
Croatia	Specific criminal provision		Specific criminal law provision.
Cyprus	Specific criminal provision	2003	Specific criminal law provision.
Czech Republic	General criminal provision		General criminal law provision.
Denmark	Specific criminal provision	2003	Specific criminal law provision.
Djibouti	Specific criminal provision	1994	As of September 2018.
DR Congo	Specific criminal provision		Specific criminal law provision.
Egypt	Specific criminal provision	2008	As of September 2018.
Eritrea	Specific anti-FGM law	2007	Specific national anti-FGM law which prohibits FGM.
Estonia	Specific criminal provision		Specific criminal law provision.
Ethiopia	Specific criminal provision	2004	As of September 2018.
Finland	General criminal provision		General criminal law provision.
France	General criminal provision		General criminal law provision, has been used successfully to prosecute FGM cases.
The Gambia	Specific criminal provision	2015	Specific criminal law provision.
Georgia	Specific criminal provision		Specific criminal law provision.
Germany	Specific criminal provision		Specific criminal law provision.
Ghana	Specific criminal provision	1994	Specific criminal law provision.
Greece	General criminal provision		General criminal law provision.
Guinea	Specific criminal provision	1965	New law enacted in 2000. Specific criminal law provision.
Guinea Bissau	Specific anti-FGM law		Specific national anti-FGM law which prohibits FGM. Cross-border FGM also criminalised.
Hungary	General criminal provision		General criminal law provision.
Iceland	Specific criminal provision	2005	General Penal Code Article 218 a. Punishment up to 6 years imprisonment, up to 16 years in aggravated cases.
India	General criminal provision	1860	Supposedly criminalised, but not specifically mentioned, by 1860 Indian Penal Code, 1973 Criminal Procedure Code and 2012 POCSO Act. Not thoroughly enforced.
Indonesia	General criminal provision	2024	Criminalised in 2006, medicalised in 2010, then recriminalised in 2014 but without punishments. Further ban enacted in 2024.
Iran	Specific criminal provision		Criminalised by the Islamic Penal Code of 2013. Article 663 explicitly mentions the following: "Mutilating or injuring either side of a woman's genitals shall carry the Diya penalty equal to half of the full Diya. Mutilating or injuring parts of the genitals shall have a proportionate penalty based on the level of injury." Additionally, Article 269 of the Islamic Penal Code of 1991 criminalises "intentional mutilation or amputation" without explicitly mentioning FGM.
Iraq	Specific criminal provision		Specific criminal law provision (in the Kurdistan Region).
Ireland	Specific criminal provision	2012	Specific criminal law provision: the Criminal Justice (Female Genital Mutilation) Act 2012.
Israel	No		As of March 2020.
Italy	Specific anti-FGM law	2005	Specific national anti-FGM law which prohibits FGM.
Jordan	No		As of March 2020.
Kenya	Specific anti-FGM law	2001	Specific national anti-FGM law which prohibits FGM. Cross-border FGM also criminalised.
Kuwait	No		As of March 2020.
Latvia	General criminal provision		General criminal law provision.
Liberia	Not anymore	(2018–9)	As of September 2018. President Ellen Johnson Sirleaf banned FGM for one year which expired on 22 January 2019.
Libya	No		As of March 2020.
Lithuania	General criminal provision		General criminal law provision.
Luxembourg	General criminal provision		General criminal law provision.
Malawi	No		As of March 2020.
Malaysia	No		As of March 2020.
Maldives	No		As of March 2020.
Mali	General criminal provision		As of December 2024, Mali’s Penal and Procedural Code, Chapter 7: Gender affronts Section 2, Article 327-2, outlaws FGM as sexual violence. FGM is classified as sexual violence in the National Holistic Strategy to put an end to Gender Based Violence – 2019-2030
Malta	Specific criminal provision		Specific criminal law provision.
Mauritania	Specific criminal provision	2005	As of September 2018.
Montenegro	Specific criminal provision		Specific criminal law provision
Netherlands	Specific criminal provision	2006	Specific criminal law provision including cross-border FGM: Articles 7.d and 71.3 combined with Articles 300–303 (additional penalties in Article 304).
New Zealand	Specific criminal provision	1995	Specific criminal law provision.
Niger	Specific criminal provision	2003	As of September 2018.
Nigeria	Federal specific criminal provision Does not apply in all states		Specific criminal law provision that does not apply in all states of Nigeria.
Norway	Specific criminal provision	1995	Specific criminal law provision.
Oman	Specific criminal provision		Specific criminal law provision.
Pakistan	No		As of March 2020.
Philippines	No		As of March 2020.
Poland	General criminal provision		General criminal law provision.
Portugal	Specific criminal provision		Specific criminal law provision.
Qatar	No		As of March 2020.
Romania	General criminal provision		General criminal law provision.
Russia	General criminal provision		General criminal law provision
Saudi Arabia	No		As of March 2020.
Senegal	Specific criminal provision	1999	Specific criminal law provision.
Serbia	Specific criminal provision		Specific criminal law provision
Sierra Leone	No		Initiation rite-related FGM was criminalised in 2019. A national law banning all FGM has been recommended by the courts.
Singapore	No		As of March 2020.
Slovakia	General criminal provision		General criminal law provision.
Slovenia	General criminal provision		General criminal law provision.
Somalia	Partly		The Constitution prohibits FGM, but there are no laws and no known prosecutions of FGM.
Somaliland (state of Somalia)	No		As of September 2018.
South Africa	Specific criminal provision	2003	Specific criminal law provision.
South Sudan	Specific criminal provision		Specific criminal law provision.
Spain	Specific criminal provision	2003	Specific criminal law provision.
Sri Lanka	No		As of March 2020.
Sudan	Specific criminal provision Restricted/banned in 6/18 states	2020	Criminalised in April 2020 by amending the Criminal Code. Punishable by a fine and 3 years imprisonment. Already restricted or banned in 6/18 states between 2008 and 2020. Reinfibulation apparently still legal.
Sweden	Specific anti-FGM law	1982	New law enacted in 1998. Specific national anti-FGM law which prohibits FGM.
Switzerland	Specific criminal provision		Specific criminal law provision.
Syria	No		As of March 2020.
Tanzania	Specific criminal provision	1998	Specific criminal law provision.
Thailand	No		As of March 2020.
Togo	Specific criminal provision	1998	Specific criminal law provision.
Uganda	Specific anti-FGM law		Specific national anti-FGM law which prohibits FGM. Cross-border FGM also criminalised.
United Arab Emirates	No		As of March 2020. Prohibited by the ministry of health in state hospitals and clinics.
United Kingdom	Specific anti-FGM law	1985	Specific national anti-FGM law which prohibits FGM.
United States	Federal anti-FGM law Specific bans in 41/50 states as of August 2023.	96–18, 2021	Criminalised federally in 1996, but federal law declared "unconstitutional" in 2018. New federal law passed in 2021. Specifically criminalised in 41/50 states as of August 2023.
Yemen	No		As of March 2020.
Zambia	Specific criminal provision		Specific criminal law provision.
Zimbabwe	Specific criminal provision		Specific criminal law provision.

== See also ==
- Prevalence of female genital mutilation
- Religious views on female genital mutilation
- Sexual consent in law
- Prevalence of circumcision
