= Gang Related =

1997 film directed by Jim Kouf

- Theatrical release poster
- Directed by: Jim Kouf
- Written by: Jim Kouf
- Produced by: John Bertolli; Brad Krevoy; Steven Stabler
- Starring: James Belushi; Dennis Quaid; Tupac Shakur; Lela Rochon; James Earl Jones; David Paymer; Wendy Crewson; Gary Cole
- Cinematography: Brian J. Reynolds
- Edited by: Todd C. Ramsay
- Music by: Mickey Hart
- Production companies: Kouf/Bigelow Productions; Orion Pictures
- Distributed by: MGM Distribution Co.
- Release date: October 8, 1997
- Running time: 111 minutes
- Country: United States
- Language: English
- Box office: $5.9 million

Gang Related, alternatively known as Criminal Intent, is a 1997 American action crime film written and directed by Jim Kouf, and starring James Belushi, Lela Rochon, Dennis Quaid, James Earl Jones, David Paymer, Wendy Crewson, Gary Cole, and Tupac Shakur in his final film role. It follows two corrupt cops, attempting to frame a homeless man for the death of an undercover Drug Enforcement Administration agent that they killed. The film is dedicated to Shakur.

== Plot ==
Vice squad detectives Frank Divinci and Jake Rodriguez set up narcotics runner Lionel Hudd in a bogus drug trafficking deal at a motel. They murder Hudd, pocket his money, and recover the cocaine he purchased from them. The detectives return both the cocaine and the murder weapon, a customized .44 magnum, to the evidence room at their headquarters. Shortly thereafter, Divinci and Rodriguez learn that Hudd was actually a deep cover DEA agent...when Hudd's partner, Richard Simms, visits their precinct to investigate the agent's murder. The two detectives resolve to find someone they can frame for Hudd's death.

The detectives choose a homeless drunk named Joe Doe, and trick him into confessing to the crime. Needing a witness, Divinci and Rodriguez press stripper Cynthia Webb, with whom Divinci has been cheating on his wife, into picking Joe out of a police lineup. It turns out Joe is actually William Dane McCall, a physician hailing from a wealthy family, who has been missing and presumed dead for years. The family's lawyer, Arthur Baylor, is selected to help Public Defender Elliot Goff represent McCall in court. At McCall's trial, he is shown to be innocent and released...while Webb is jailed for perjury.

Sitting in a car, Rodriguez records a conversation with Divinci in which the latter admits to killing Hudd and framing McCall. When he learns that Rodriguez has done this, he forces Rodriguez out of the car at gunpoint. Returning to his apartment, Rodriguez is confronted by his bookie Vic and his bodyguard, Mr. Cutlass Supreme, who murder Rodriguez over an outstanding gambling debt. Investigating Rodriguez's death, the police find the damaged tape of Divinci's confession. Baylor questions Webb about Hudd's murder, playing back the plan by Divinci to kill her as a loose end. Webb tells Baylor everything she knows about Divinci's crimes. Divinci hides out in Webb's apartment and shoots her for betraying him. Webb is rushed to the hospital, where Doctor McCall learns of her shooting. Divinci arranges with local bail bondsman Manny Ladrew for a limousine ride to the airport. The driver turns out to be recently-acquitted serial killer Clyde David Dunner, whose own trial fell apart because his gun was used in the Hudd murder. Dunner shoots Divinci dead, then abandons the limousine in an alley.

== Cast ==
- James Belushi as Detective Franklin "Frank" Divinci
- Tupac Shakur as Detective Jacob "Jake" Rodriguez
- Lela Rochon as Cynthia Webb
- Dennis Quaid as William McCall / Joe Doe
- James Earl Jones as Arthur Baylor, attorney at law
- David Paymer as Elliot Goff
- Wendy Crewson as District Attorney Helen Eden
- Gary Cole as Agent Richard Simms, DEA
- T.C. Carson as Manny Ladrew
- Brad Greenquist as Assistant District Attorney Richard Stein
- James Handy as Captain Henderson
- Kool Moe Dee as Agent Lionel Hudd, DEA
- Victor Love as Agent Hooper, DEA
- Robert LaSardo as Agent Sarkasian, DEA
- Perry Anzilotti as Vic, Jake's bookie
- Gregory Scott Cummins as Clyde David Dunner
- Deborah Rennard as Caroline Divinci, Frank's wife
- Tom Ormeny as Nathan McCall, William's brother
- Tommy "Tiny" Lister Jr. as "Cutlass Supreme"

== Production ==
Kouf recalled in a 2018 interview where he got the inspiration for the film:

"I had done a few cop movies, like Stakeout and The Hidden, and the cops were the good guys. I was toying with the idea of reality and memory and how they can be manipulated. And crime is where reality and memory are always tested. I think of Gang Related as grim farce. It’s about a couple cops who think they have a handle on how to clean up the streets by taking down drug dealers, making a little profit on the side, and blaming it on a "gang related" murder".

In a previous interview, Kouf said about Shakur:

"He was a talented guy and knew what he was doing on set. I heard a lot of nightmare stories about him going on but I never had any problems with him".

The film was shot in August 1996, a month before Shakur’s death and the film was released the next year.

== Reception ==
Gang Related opened with 1,260 theaters in North America on October 8, 1997. It made $2,443,237 on its opening weekend with an average of $1,939 per theater, ranking at No. 10 at the box office. The film ended up earning $5,906,773.

The film received mixed reviews, and has the rating of 52% on Rotten Tomatoes, based on 21 reviews. On Metacritic — which assigns a weighted mean score — the film has a score of 49 out of 100 based on 28 critics, indicating "mixed or average" reviews. Audiences polled by CinemaScore gave the film an average grade of "C+" on an A+ to F scale.

The film was released in the United Kingdom on August 14, 1998, and opened on #11. Roger Ebert appraised the film more positively in an episode of At the Movies:

The screenplay shows a lot of nerve in making the central characters into villains. We identify, I think, with them anyway to a degree, maybe because they trigger our own built-in guilt. The dialogue crackles with life and energy. There are a lot of colorful characters. My only complaint is that the ending is a little too neat after everything that's gone before. This movie is good enough to deserve a better ending.

About the film's reception and box office results, Jim Belushi said: "Right around that time, when that movie came out, there was a gang related shooting at a movie theater in Los Angeles. That just ruined the opening of that movie. Everyone was afraid to go to the movie theatre, especially with the title Gang Related. Nobody went. Regardless, it’s become kind of a cult film since its release."

Kouf said about the film and Shakur: “Tupac was great to work with. He really wanted acting to be his way out of the music world, which was controlling his life at the time. He was also going to score the movie, but was killed 10 days after we finished shooting. He was a great guy. We had a lot of fun on set. And Gang Related had one of the best casts I’ve ever worked with.“

== Soundtrack ==
Year	Title	Chart positions		Certifications (sales thresholds)
Year	Title	U.S.	U.S. R&B	Certifications (sales thresholds)
1997	Gang Related – The Soundtrack: Released: October 7, 1997; Label: Death Row	2	1	US: 2× Platinum
