= Reversion (2015 film) =

- Directed by: Jose Nestor Marquez
- Written by: Jose Nestor Marquez; Elissa Matsueda
- Story by: Jose Nestor Marquez
- Produced by: Tatiana Kelly; Matthew Lewis; Aaron Sherry
- Starring: Aja Naomi King; Colm Feore; Amanda Plummer; Lela Rochon
- Cinematography: Anne Etheridge
- Edited by: Victor Du Bois; Cecilia Hyoun
- Music by: Michael Tuller
- Release date: October 9, 2015 (Limited)
- Running time: 84 minutes
- Country: United States
- Language: English

Reversion is a 2015 American science fiction thriller film directed by Jose Nestor Marquez and starring Aja Naomi King, Colm Feore, Amanda Plummer and Lela Rochon.

== Cast ==
- Aja Naomi King as Sophie Clé
- Colm Feore as Jack Clé
- Amanda Plummer as Elizabeth
- Lela Rochon as Maya
- Jeanette Samano as Isa Reyes
- Gary Dourdan as Ayden
- David Clennon as Clespy

== Reception ==
On the review aggregator website Rotten Tomatoes, 38% of 8 critics' reviews are positive. Metacritic, which uses a weighted average, assigned the film a score of 40 out of 100, based on 4 critics, indicating "mixed or average" reviews.

Wes Greene of Slant Magazine awarded the film two stars out of four, and wrote, "Reversion may look like a dream, but it plays like someone reading a congressional report on corporate finagling out loud." On Los Angeles Times, Martin Tsai gave the film a positive review, writing that it is "a clever cautionary tale about virtual reality."

== See also ==
- Rememory, a 2017 film also dealing with a human memory device
