= The Knife (2024 film) =

Film by Nnamdi Asomugha

- Theatrical release poster
- Directed by: Nnamdi Asomugha
- Written by: Mark Duplass; Nnamdi Asomugha
- Produced by: Nnamdi Asomugha; Jonathan T. Baker; Ami Werges
- Starring: Nnamdi Asomugha; Melissa Leo; Aja Naomi King; Manny Jacinto; Amari Price; Aiden Price
- Cinematography: Alejandro Mejia
- Edited by: Dana Congdon
- Music by: Kyle Townsend
- Production companies: iAm21 Entertainment; Duplass Brothers Productions
- Distributed by: Relativity Media; Inaugural Entertainment
- Release dates: June 9, 2024 (Tribeca Festival); August 15, 2025 (United States)
- Running time: 81 minutes
- Country: United States
- Language: English

The Knife is a 2024 American psychological drama film produced and directed by Nnamdi Asomugha (in his directorial debut) and co-written by Asomugha and Mark Duplass. The film stars Asomugha, Melissa Leo, Aja Naomi King, and Manny Jacinto. It follows a family over the course of one night after an intruder breaks into their home, leading to a tense, mind-twisting investigation.

The film premiered in competition at the Tribeca Film Festival on June 9, 2024, where it won awards for Best New Narrative Director and Best Cinematography and was nominated for the Founders Award for Best U.S. Narrative Feature. It had its European premiere on September 11, 2024, at the Deauville American Film Festival, where it won the Jury Prize and was nominated for the festival's Grand Prix.

On November 4, 2024, Asomugha was honored with the Breakthrough Director Award at the Denver Film Festival.

== Cast ==
- Nnamdi Asomugha as Chris
- Melissa Leo as Detective Carlsen
- Aja Naomi King as Alexandra
- Manny Jacinto as Officer Padilla
- Amari Price as Kendra
- Aiden Price as Ryley
- Shannon Corbeil as Officer Snell
- Lucinda Jenney as Mary Duvall-Thompson

== Production ==
On January 18, 2022, it was announced that Nnamdi Asomugha would direct his first feature film from a script he co-wrote with filmmaker Mark Duplass. It was also announced that Melissa Leo would star alongside Asomugha, and production would take place in Los Angeles, with iAm21 Entertainment and Duplass Brothers Productions producing. Aja Naomi King and Manny Jacinto were also added to the cast.

== Reception ==
On the review aggregator website Rotten Tomatoes, 91% of 35 critics' reviews are positive. Metacritic, which uses a weighted average, assigned the film a score of 62 out of 100, based on 4 critics, indicating "generally favorable reviews".

Lovia Gyarkye, a critic for The Hollywood Reporter, highlighted the film's "chilling and visceral frankness" and called it "not just a story of horror, but of heartbreak."

== Release ==
The Knife was released in the United States on August 15, 2025.
