= Eugene Ashe =

American director and screenwriter

Eugene Booker T. Washington Johnson Ashe known professionally as Eugene Ashe is an Emmy nominated writer-director and former Sony Music recording artist from New York City. His award-winning Amazon Original film Sylvie's Love, premiered at the 2020 Sundance Film Festival in the US Dramatic Competition and has a score of 94% on Rotten Tomatoes. The film was nominated for an Emmy and a Critics Choice Award for best Movie in the TV category, as well as five NAACP Awards, and won the NAACP award for Outstanding Directing.

As a writer, Eugene has written screenplays for Paramount Pictures, Walt Disney Pictures, and Amazon Studios, as well as pilot scripts for FOX Television and MGM TV.

He is currently in post production on the Netflix feature film "Don't Ever Wonder," which reunites the Love Jones duo Nia Long and Larenz Tate, with MACRO Studios producing. Eugene is represented by Nicole Romano at Anonymous Content.

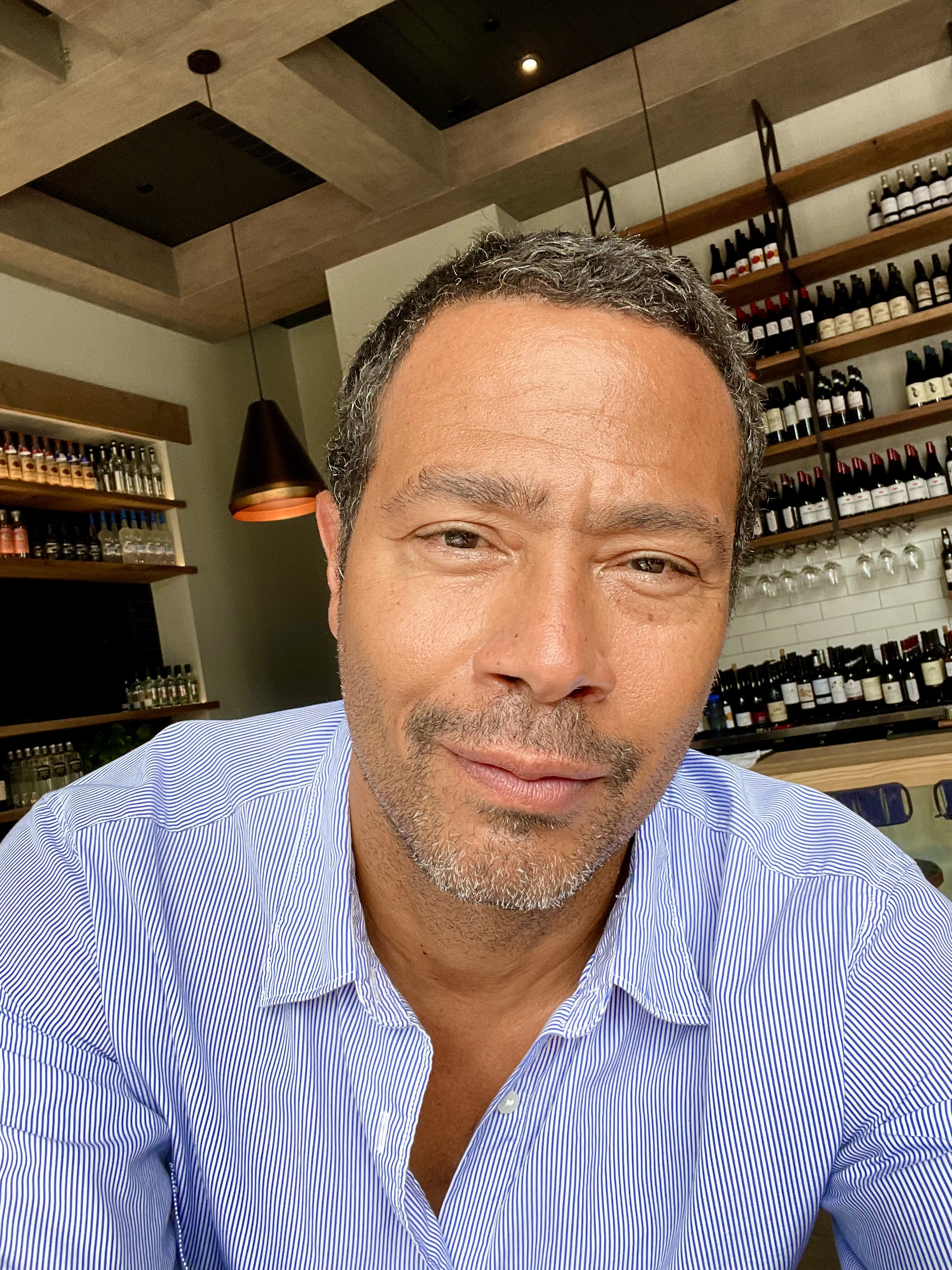

== Filmography ==
- Sylvie's Love (2020)
- Homecoming (2012)
