= Sylvie's Love =

- Official release poster
- Directed by: Eugene Ashe
- Written by: Eugene Ashe
- Produced by: Eugene Ashe; Nnamdi Asomugha; Gabrielle Glore; Jonathan Baker; Matthew Thurm
- Starring: Tessa Thompson; Nnamdi Asomugha; Ryan Michelle Bathe; Regé-Jean Page; Aja Naomi King; Eva Longoria
- Cinematography: Declan Quinn
- Edited by: Dana Congdon
- Music by: Fabrice Lecomte
- Production companies: Iam21 Entertainment; Seven Letter Word Films
- Distributed by: Amazon Studios
- Release dates: January 27, 2020 (Sundance); December 23, 2020 (United States)
- Running time: 114 minutes
- Country: United States
- Language: English

Sylvie's Love is a 2020 American romantic drama film, written, directed and produced by Eugene Ashe. The film stars Tessa Thompson, Nnamdi Asomugha, Ryan Michelle Bathe, Regé-Jean Page, Aja Naomi King, and Eva Longoria.

Sylvie's Love had its world premiere at the Sundance Film Festival on January 27, 2020, and was released on December 23, 2020, by Amazon Studios.

== Plot ==
In New York City, 1962, Sylvie is waiting outside Town Hall, while Robert is in a recording studio playing the saxophone. Moments later, Sylvie recognizes Robert on the sidewalk outside a theater.

Five years earlier, Sylvie's father hires Robert to work at his record store in Harlem. Robert is the saxophonist for The Dickie Brewster Quartet, an up-and-coming jazz band from Detroit. Sylvie and Robert bond over their shared love for music; Robert eventually invites Sylvie and her cousin Mona to a gig. Mona has a fling with Robert's bandmate Chico while Sylvie, despite her engagement to a wealthy man named Lacy who is fighting in the Korean War, eventually starts a passionate affair with Robert. Some time later, the Dickie Brewster Quartet's manager, a woman who calls herself the Countess, books them a job in Paris. Robert asks Sylvie to come with him. Sylvie refuses but bids him goodbye before his departure, hiding the fact the she is pregnant with his child from him as not to derail his career.

Back in 1962, Sylvie invites Robert to watch the concert with her. She learns that the band is doing well and is back in New York City to record an album. That night, Sylvie and Robert sleep together before she returns home to Lacy, now a successful businessman, and her daughter Michelle. Sylvie gets a job as a production assistant on a major cooking show produced by a black woman, Kate Spencer, a job Sylvie enjoys despite Lacy's concerns that it will interfere with her duties as a wife. Robert sends Sylvie a ticket to his show, but she sees him in the parking lot with another woman afterwards and leaves.

Sylvie and Robert attend separate New Year's Eve parties. Kate informs Sylvie that she is quitting to get married and is promoting Sylvie to take her place. Tensions spring up around the band; Sid, the record company executive who monitors the band, offers Robert a chance to record his own material. That night, Sylvie's father has a heart attack and passes away; while in the hospital he calls Robert and tells him that Michelle is his daughter. During the funeral, Sylvie and Lacy agree to split up. Robert approaches Sylvie about Michelle's paternity; eventually, she lets him meet Michelle, and Robert moves into her house.

Some time later, Robert approaches Sid about his offer, but Sid turns him down as he believes jazz is dying. Sylvie assures him that she can provide for them while Robert sorts things out. Robert tells Sylvie that he is thinking of contacting an old friend who had offered to put him in touch with Motown musicians, but if the job is successful, they will have to move to Detroit. The job offer turns out to be a bust; upon returning to New York, Robert realizes that Sylvie loves her career too much for them to move. He tells Sylvie he got the job, but that he will move to Detroit alone. Sylvie tells him to leave. Robert returns to Detroit and gets a job at an auto plant.

The week of the March on Washington for Jobs and Freedom, Sylvie comes to D.C. to visit Mona, and runs into Dickie's wife Carmen at the hotel. Carmen informs her that Robert is working at a plant. Mona muses that Robert did not tell her about the auto plant job for the same reason Sylvie did not tell him about the pregnancy: they did not want to destroy the other person's career. Sylvie travels to Detroit and meets Robert at the plant. She tells him she can't be happy without him in her life; the two reconcile.

The end credits intersperse scenes of Robert, Sylvie, and Michelle at the beach with scenes showing that Robert inherited Sylvie's father's saxophone and eventually started performing again, while Sylvie continued to work in production.

== Cast ==
- Tessa Thompson as Sylvie Parker (née Johnson)
- Nnamdi Asomugha as Robert Halloway
- Aja Naomi King as Mona
- Ryan Michelle Bathe as Kate Spencer
- Regé-Jean Page as Chico Sweetney
- Eva Longoria as Carmen
- John Magaro as Sid Schuur
- Ed Weeks as Chase Nickerson
- Lance Reddick as Herbert "Mr. Jay" Johnson
- Jemima Kirke as The Countess
- MC Lyte as Mikki
- Alano Miller as Lacy Parker
- Erica Gimpel as Eunice Johnson
- Tone Bell as Dickie Brewster
- Wendi McLendon-Covey as Lucy Wolper
- Ron Funches as Tank
- Raquel Horsford as Connie
- Kareem Stroud as Ed Beasley
- Christian Lagadec as Antoine Fournier

== Production ==
In February 2014, it was announced Larenz Tate would star in and produce the film Sylvie’s Love, with Eugene Ashe directing from a screenplay he wrote. In February 2019, it was announced Tessa Thompson and Nnamdi Asomugha had joined the cast of the film, with Asomugha, Jonathan Baker, Gabrielle Glore, and Matthew Thurm producing the film, while Thompson will serve as an executive producer along with Matthew Rachamkin. In March 2019, Ryan Michelle Bathe, Regé-Jean Page, Aja Naomi King, Eva Longoria, John Magaro, Lance Reddick, Jemima Kirke, MC Lyte, Alano Miller, Erica Gimpel, Tone Bell and Wendi McLendon-Covey joined the cast of the film. In April 2019, Ron Funches joined the cast of the film. In October 2020, Ed Weeks joined the cast of the film.

=== Filming ===
Principal photography began in Los Angeles on February 25, 2019.

The movie also had filming done in Santa Clarita

== Release ==
It had its world premiere at the Sundance Film Festival on January 27, 2020. Shortly after, Amazon Studios acquired distribution rights to the film. It was released on December 23, 2020, after previously scheduled for December 25, 2020.

== Reception ==
Review aggregator Rotten Tomatoes gives the film a 93% approval rating based on 123 reviews, with an average rating of 7.3/10. The website's critic consensus reads: "A romance for the ages, Sylvie's Love wraps audiences in the sweet embrace of its old-fashioned romance and celebration of Black love." Metacritic reports a score of 74 out of 100 based on 25 critic reviews, indicating "generally favorable reviews".

== Awards and nominations ==
Year	Award	Category	Nominee(s)	Result	Ref.
2021	Black Film Critics Circle Awards	Best Picture	Sylvie's Love	Nominated	
2021	Black Reel Awards	Outstanding Independent Film	Eugene Ashe	Nominated	
2021	Black Reel Awards	Outstanding Actress	Tessa Thompson	Nominated	
2021	Black Reel Awards	Outstanding Costume Design	Phoenix Mellow	Nominated	
2021	Black Reel Awards	Outstanding Original Score	Fabrice Lecomte	Nominated	
2021	Black Reel Awards	Outstanding Emerging Director	Eugene Ashe	Nominated	
2021	Black Reel Awards	Outstanding First Screenplay	Eugene Ashe	Nominated	
2021	Black Reel Awards for Television	Outstanding TV Movie or Limited Series	Jonathan T. Baker, Eugene Ashe and Nnamdi Asomugha	Nominated	
2021	Black Reel Awards for Television	Outstanding Actor, TV Movie/Limited Series	Nnamdi Asomugha	Nominated	
2021	Black Reel Awards for Television	Outstanding Actress, TV Movie/Limited Series	Tessa Thompson	Nominated	
2021	Black Reel Awards for Television	Outstanding Director, TV Movie/Limited Series	Eugene Ashe	Nominated	
2021	Black Reel Awards for Television	Outstanding Writing, TV Movie/Limited Series	Eugene Ashe	Won	
2021	Black Reel Awards for Television	Outstanding Music (Comedy, Drama, TV Movie or Limited Series)	Fabrice Lecomte	Nominated	
2021	Critics' Choice Television Awards	Best Movie Made for Television	Sylvie's Love	Nominated	
2021	Critics' Choice Television Awards	Best Actress in a Limited Series or Movie Made for Television	Tessa Thompson	Nominated	
2021	Chicago Indie Critics Awards	Best Costume Design	Phoenix Mellow	Nominated	
2021	Chlotrudis Awards	Best Use of Music in a Film	Fabrice Lecomte, Frankie Pine and Steven Argila	Nominated	
2021	Make-Up Artists and Hair Stylists Guild Awards	Best Period and/or Character Makeup – Television Special, One Hour or More Live Program Series or Movie for Television	Angela Wells, Angel Radefeld-Wright and Brigitte Hennech	Nominated	
2021	Make-Up Artists and Hair Stylists Guild Awards	Best Period Hair Styling and/or Character Hair Styling – Television Special, One Hour or More Live Program Series or Movie for Television	Carla Joi Farmer, Linda Villalobos, Lillie Frierson and Stacey Morris	Nominated	
2021	NAACP Image Awards	Outstanding Television Movie, Limited-Series or Dramatic Special	Sylvie's Love	Nominated	
2021	NAACP Image Awards	Outstanding Actor in a Television Movie, Limited-Series or Dramatic Special	Nnamdi Asomugha	Nominated	
2021	NAACP Image Awards	Outstanding Actress in a Television Movie, Limited-Series or Dramatic Special	Tessa Thompson	Nominated	
2021	NAACP Image Awards	Outstanding Directing in a Television Movie or Special	Eugene Ashe	Won	
2021	NAACP Image Awards	Outstanding Writing in a Television Movie or Special	Eugene Ashe	Nominated	
2021	Primetime Emmy Awards	Outstanding Television Movie	Tessa Thompson, Bobbi Sue Luther, Akbar Gbaja-Biamila, Matt Rachamkin, Arinze Okwuadigbo, Obinna Okwuadigbo, Jay Gaines, Carl Daryl Washington, Nnamdi Asomugha, Gabrielle Glore, Jonathan T. Baker, Eugene Ashe and Matthew Thurm	Nominated	
2021	The ReFrame Stamp	Narrative & Animated Feature	Sylvie's Love	Won	
2021	Satellite Awards	Best Motion Picture Made for Television	Sylvie's Love	Nominated	
