= Aja Naomi King =

American film and television actress

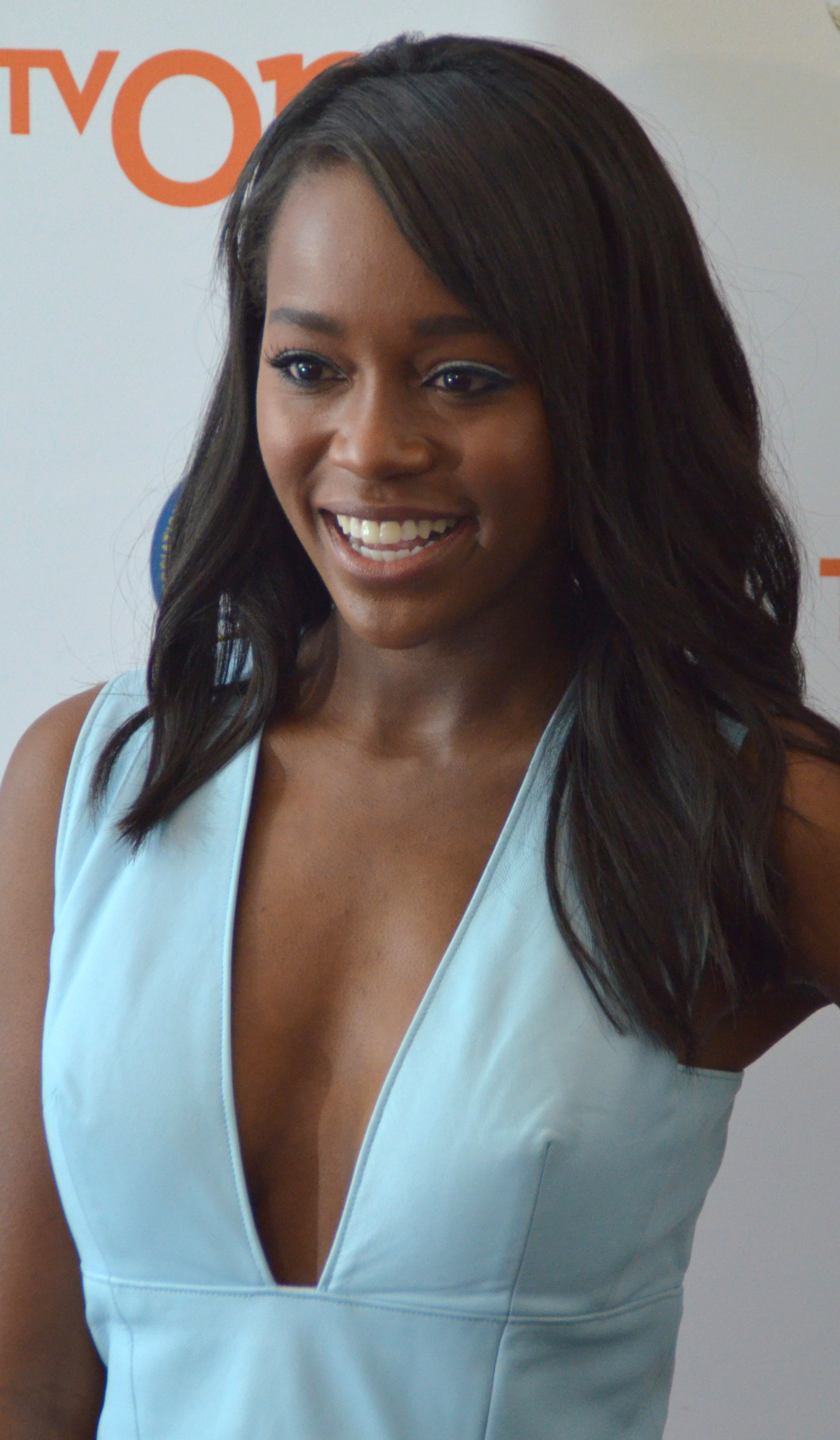
- King in December 2014
- Born: January 11, 1985 (age 41); Los Angeles, California, U.S.
- Education: University of California, Santa Barbara (BFA); Yale University (MFA)
- Occupation: Actress
- Years active: 2008–present
- Spouse: Dan King
- Children: 1
- Awards: Full list

Aja Naomi King (/ˈeɪdʒə/; born January 11, 1985) is an American actress. King began her career in guest-starring roles on television, and starred in the short-lived CW medical comedy-drama series Emily Owens, M.D. (2012–2013). She also has starred in the films Four (2012) and Reversion (2015). After her breakthrough as Michaela Pratt in the ABC legal drama series How to Get Away with Murder (2014–2020), she received praise for portraying Cherry Turner in the historical film The Birth of a Nation (2016).

Alongside leading roles in the biographical drama A Girl from Mogadishu (2019) and the romantic comedy Boxing Day (2021), King also had supporting roles in the comedy dramas The Upside (2017) and Sylvie's Love (2020), and the historical drama The 24th (2020). For Apple TV+'s Lessons in Chemistry (2023), she was nominated for the Primetime Emmy Award for Outstanding Supporting Actress in a Limited or Anthology Series or Movie.

== Early life ==
King was born in Los Angeles and grew up in Walnut, California. She received a Bachelor of Fine Arts in Acting from the University of California, Santa Barbara, and a Master of Fine Arts from Yale University's School of Drama in 2010. At Yale University, King performed in a number of productions, including A Midsummer Night's Dream, Little Shop of Horrors, and Angels in America: A Gay Fantasia on National Themes. After graduating from Yale, she worked as a waitress in New York City for three years while auditioning for acting roles.

== Career ==
=== 2010–2013: Early work ===
King appeared in several short films in the early period of her career. She made her television debut in 2010, as a guest star in the CBS police procedural Blue Bloods, and later appeared on Person of Interest, The Blacklist and Deadbeat. She made her feature film debut in the 2011 independent film Damsels in Distress, as a minor character. Her big break came in 2012, when she was cast as new surgical intern Cassandra Kopelson and the series' primary antagonist, on the CW medical comedy-drama series Emily Owens, M.D. The series was canceled after a single season in 2013. She later starred in the Amazon Studios comedy pilot The Onion Presents: The News.

In 2013, King co-starred in two independent films. She played Abigayle, the daughter of Wendell Pierce's character, in the independent drama Four, released on September 13, 2013. Along with her castmates, she won a Los Angeles Film Festival Award for Best Performance by Cast for her role in this movie. She also appeared alongside Laverne Cox and Britne Oldford in the film 36 Saints. In 2014, she had supporting role in the romantic comedy The Rewrite, starring Hugh Grant and Marisa Tomei. The film was shot in 2013 but was released theatrically in the United States in 2015.

=== 2014–present: Breakthrough and prominence ===
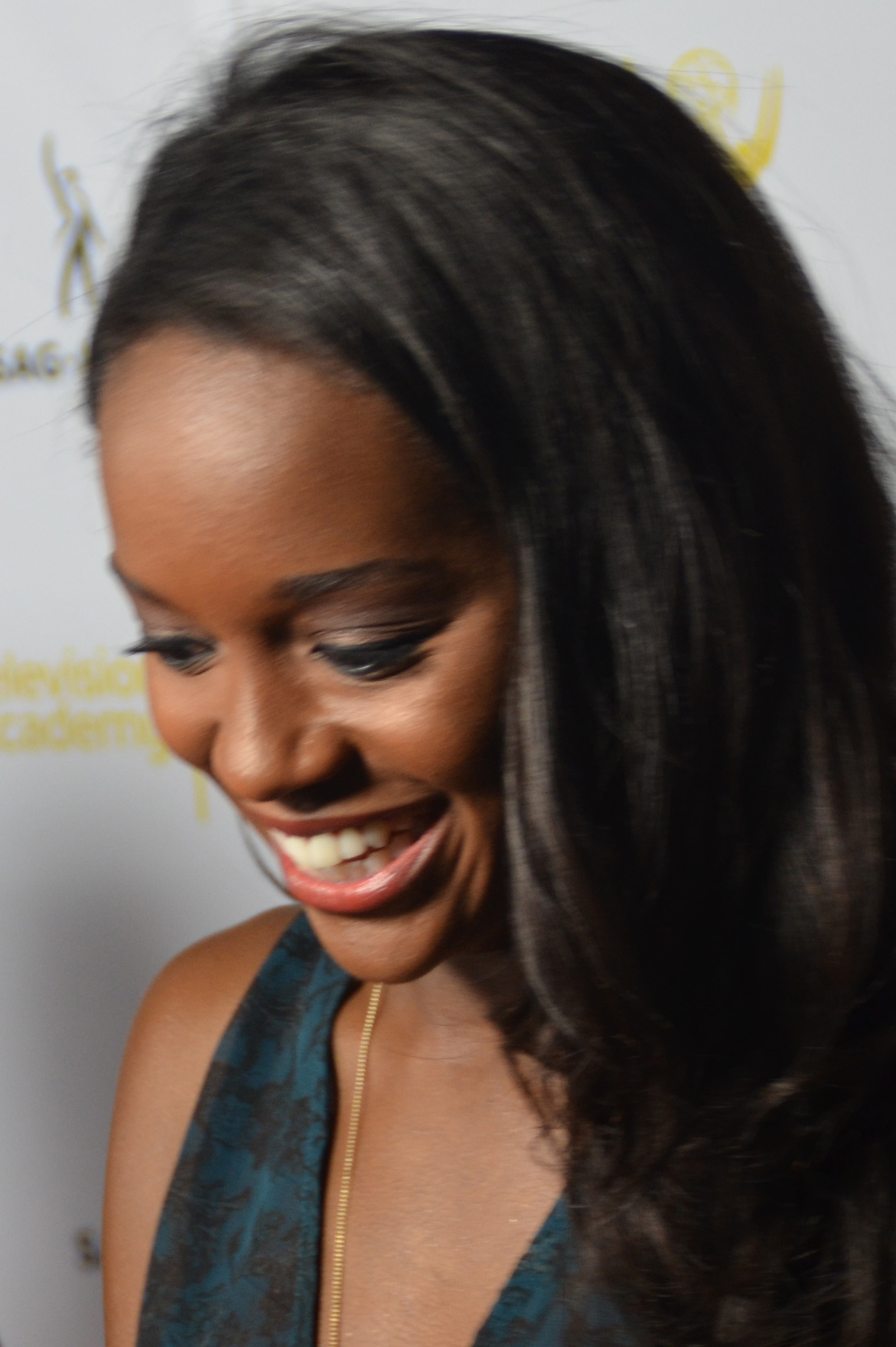
King in August 2014

In early 2014, King had a recurring role as Ali Henslee in the ABC medical drama series Black Box, starring Kelly Reilly. The series was canceled after a single season. In February 2014, she was cast as one of the main characters in the ABC legal thriller How to Get Away with Murder, produced by Shonda Rhimes. The series stars Viola Davis as a law professor Annalise Keating. King plays the role of Michaela Pratt, one of the five lead students, alongside Alfred Enoch, Jack Falahee, Matt McGorry, and Karla Souza. The series premiered on September 25, 2014, with generally positive reviews from critics, and 14 million viewers. King received her first NAACP Image Award nomination for her performance in series.

In 2015, King had her first the leading role in the science-fiction thriller Reversion. The film had limited theatrical release on October 9, 2015. Also in 2015, she was cast as the female lead in the historical drama film The Birth of a Nation, based on the story of the 1831 slave rebellion led by Nat Turner. The film also stars Nate Parker, Aunjanue Ellis, Gabrielle Union, and Armie Hammer. She played Nat Turner's wife, Cherry. The film premiered in competition at the 2016 Sundance Film Festival on January 25, 2016, and received positive reviews from critics. King's performance was also well received. Variety placed her in their list of one of the "Biggest Breakthrough Performances" at Sundance, writing that "King transforms herself from contemporary glamour girl to 19th-century slave in Nate Parker's festival smash. A harrowing scene late in the film opposite Parker as Nat Turner reveals a depth and range King has never been asked to deliver in her small screen work, and a potential new star is born." King had also been shortlisted as a possible contender for the Academy Award for Best Supporting Actress but did not receive a nomination. She received an NAACP Image Award for Outstanding Supporting Actress in a Motion Picture nomination for her role. She received the "Rising Star Award" at the 10th annual Essence Black Women In Hollywood event in February 2017.

In 2017, King appeared opposite Kevin Hart, Bryan Cranston, and Nicole Kidman in The Upside, a remake of the 2011 French film The Intouchables. Later that year, she was cast in the leading role of Somali activist Ifrah Ahmed in the biopic A Girl from Mogadishu. In 2020, she appeared in the drama film Sylvie's Love, opposite Tessa Thompson and Nnamdi Asomugha. King later played a female leading role in the historical drama film The 24th about Houston riot of 1917 directed by Kevin Willmott. King will next star in Michael Maren's A Little White Lie in 2023. She also starred opposite Nnamdi Asomugha in his feature directorial debut, The Knife.

In 2021, she appeared opposite Aml Ameen in his directorial debut Boxing Day. In 2023, King co-starred opposite Brie Larson in the Apple TV+ miniseries, Lessons in Chemistry.

== Modeling ==
King was the face of skincare line Olay's fall 2015 advertising campaign. She became a spokesperson for L'Oreal Paris in 2017 and has since appeared in numerous campaigns for the brand. In 2022, she appeared in an advertising campaign for jewellery brand Chopard.

During her career, King has graced the covers of numerous magazines, including Vanity Fair, Elle, Marie Claire, Nylon, Glamour, Essence, Entertainment Weekly and Shape.

== Personal life ==
In March 2021, she announced that she was pregnant after previously experiencing two miscarriages. On June 6, 2021, she announced that she had given birth to a son, Kian, with husband Dan King.

== Filmography ==
=== Film ===
Year	Title	Role	Notes
2010	A Basketball Jones	Sara Walker	Short film
2011	Damsels in Distress	Positive Polly	
2012	Four	Abigayle	
2013	36 Saints	Joan	
2014	The Rewrite	Rosa Tejeda	
2015	Reversion	Sophie Clé	
2016	The Birth of a Nation	Cherry Turner	
2017	The Upside	Latrice	
2019	A Girl from Mogadishu	Ifrah Ahmed	
2020	Sylvie's Love	Mona	
2020	The 24th	Marie	
2021	Boxing Day	Lisa Dixon	
2022	A Little White Lie	Blythe Brown	
2025	The Knife	Alex	

=== Television ===
Year	Title	Role	Notes
2010	Blue Bloods	Denise	Episode: "Samaritan"
2012	Person of Interest	Lisa	Episode: "Wolf and Cub"
2012–2013	Emily Owens, M.D.	Cassandra Kopelson	Main cast; 13 episodes
2013	Onion News Empire	Jillian	Television pilot
2013	The Blacklist	Elysa Ruben	Episode: "Frederick Barnes (No. 47)"
2014	Deadbeat	N'Cole	Episode: "Out-Of-Body Issues"
2014	Black Box	Ali Henslee	Recurring cast; 8 episodes
2014–2020	How to Get Away with Murder	Michaela Pratt	Main cast; 90 episodes
2015	BoJack Horseman	BoJack's Date (voice)	Episode: "Yesterdayland"
2018	Scandal	Michaela Pratt	Episode: "Allow Me to Reintroduce Myself"
2019	A Black Lady Sketch Show	Recluse	Episode: "Your Boss Knows You Don't Have Eyebrows"
2021	Blackout	Wren Foster (voice)	Main cast; 9 episodes
2023	Lessons in Chemistry	Harriet Slone	Main cast; 8 episodes
2025	Grosse Pointe Garden Society	Catherine	Main cast

== Awards and nominations ==
Year	Award	Category	Work	Result
2013	Los Angeles Film Festival	Los Angeles Film Festival Award for Best Performance by an Ensemble	Four	Won
2015	NAACP Image Awards	NAACP Image Award for Outstanding Supporting Actress in a Drama Series	How to Get Away with Murder	Nominated
2017	NAACP Image Awards	NAACP Image Award for Outstanding Supporting Actress in a Motion Picture	The Birth of a Nation	Nominated
2017	Black Reel Awards	Black Reel Award for Outstanding Breakthrough Performance, Female	The Birth of a Nation	Nominated
2024	Critics' Choice Television Awards	Critics' Choice Television Award for Best Supporting Actress in a Movie/Miniseries	Lessons in Chemistry	Nominated
2024	Primetime Emmy Award	Outstanding Supporting Actress in a Limited or Anthology Series or Movie	Lessons in Chemistry	Nominated
