= A Girl from Mogadishu =

- Film poster
- Directed by: Mary McGuckian
- Screenplay by: Mary McGuckian
- Produced by: Mary McGuckian; Adrian Politowski
- Starring: Aja Naomi King; Barkhad Abdi
- Cinematography: Michael Lavelle
- Edited by: Sarah Kian, Sylvie Landra, Mairead McIvor, Gareth Nolan, Janet Twomey
- Music by: Nitin Sawhney
- Release date: February 22, 2019 (Dublin Film Festival)
- Running time: 113 minutes
- Countries: Ireland; Belgium
- Language: English

A Girl from Mogadishu is an Irish-Belgian film. It is a somewhat fictionalized story based on the testimony of Ifrah Ahmed, who having escaped war-torn Somalia, emerged as one of the world’s foremost international activists against gender-based violence. Filming in Belgium commenced October 18, 2017 and was completed in Ireland and Morocco. The film stars Aja Naomi King as Ifrah, Martha Canga Antonio, Barkhad Abdi, and Maryam Mursals. Winner of the 2020 Cinema for Peace Women's Empowerment Award.

== Plot ==
Born into a refugee camp in war-torn Somalia, Ifrah is trafficked to Ireland as a teenager. Recounting her traumatic childhood experiences of female genital mutilation when applying for refugee status, she is re-traumatised and vows to devote her life to the eradication of the practice. Taking her campaign all the way to the President of Ireland and finally to the European Parliament and United Nations. A Girl from Mogadishu celebrates the power of testimony, for when women find the courage to stand-up, speak out, and tell their truth, the impact can be so inspiring and empowering that act as a meaningful catalyst for change.

== Production ==
The film is a Pembridge (Ireland) and Umedia (Belgium) production, with production services provided by Dune Film Productions in Morocco. Post-production took place at Windmill Pictures in Dublin and Umedia VFX in Brussels.

Principal photography began in Belgium in October 2017. The film was also shot in Dublin and Morocco in 2018.

== Reception ==
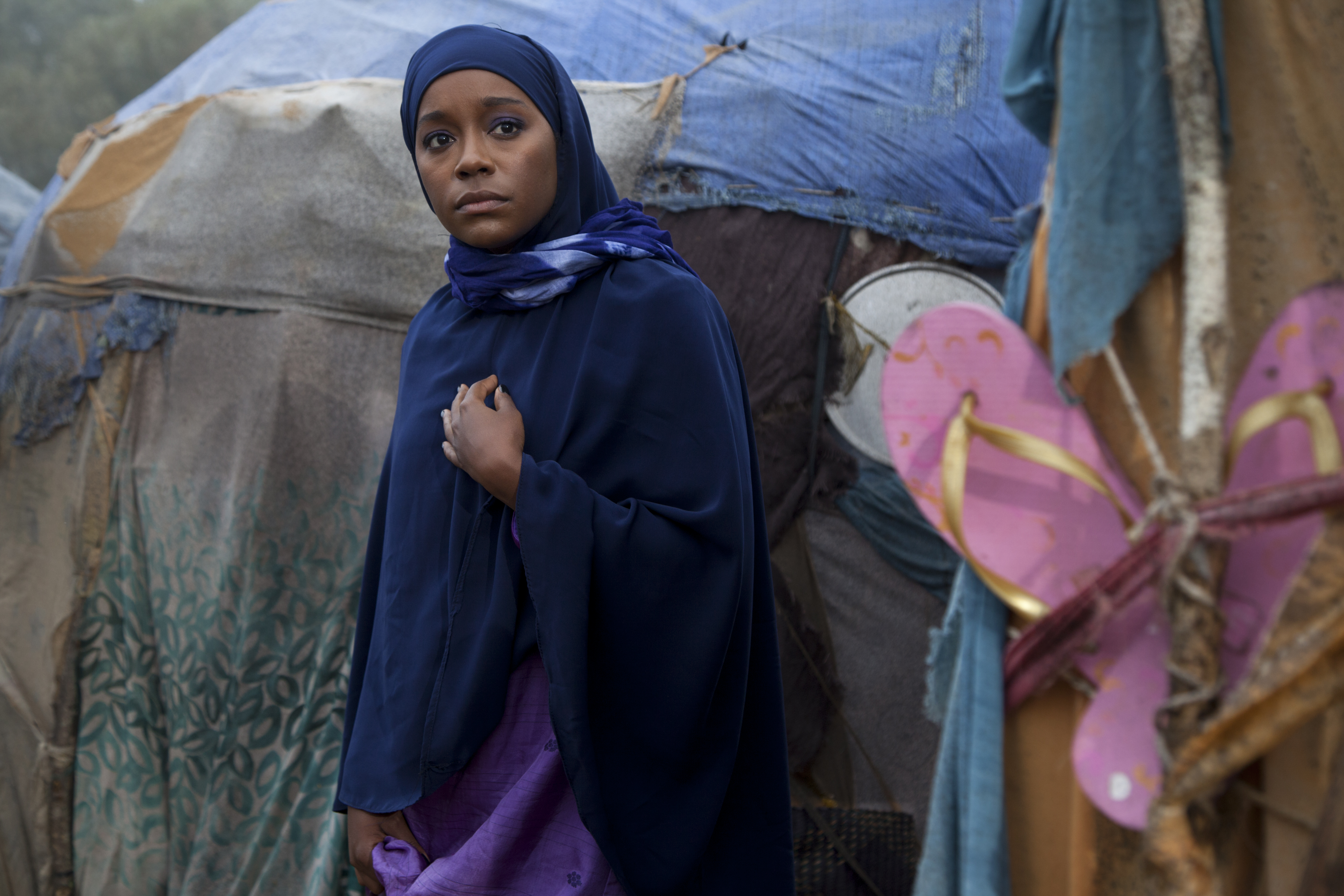
Aja Naomi King as Ifrah Ahmed

The film was released during COVID to positive reviews and has an 89% positive rating on Rotten Tomatoes.

It won both the Audience and Jury Awards at the Semaine de Cinema Britannique, the World Cinema Audience Award at the Mill Valley Film Festival and the Cinema for Peace Award for Women's Empowerment during the 2020 Berlin Film Festival.

The film is available in most English Speaking Territories and was released on SHOWTIME in the US, VOLTA and IFI in the UK and on SKY in the UK. It is also available on AMAZON PRIME in the US and on APPLE TV in the UK.

== Cast ==
- Aja Naomi King as Ifrah Ahmed
- Martha Canga Antonio as Amala
- Barkhad Abdi as Hassan
- Maryam Mursal as Grandmother
- Maggie O'Kane as Catherine Riley
- Niall Buggy as Michael D. Higgins
- Stanley Townsend as Joe Costello
- Orla Brady as Emer Costello
