= Ifrah Ahmed =

Somali-Irish social activist

Ifrah Ahmed إفراح أحمد
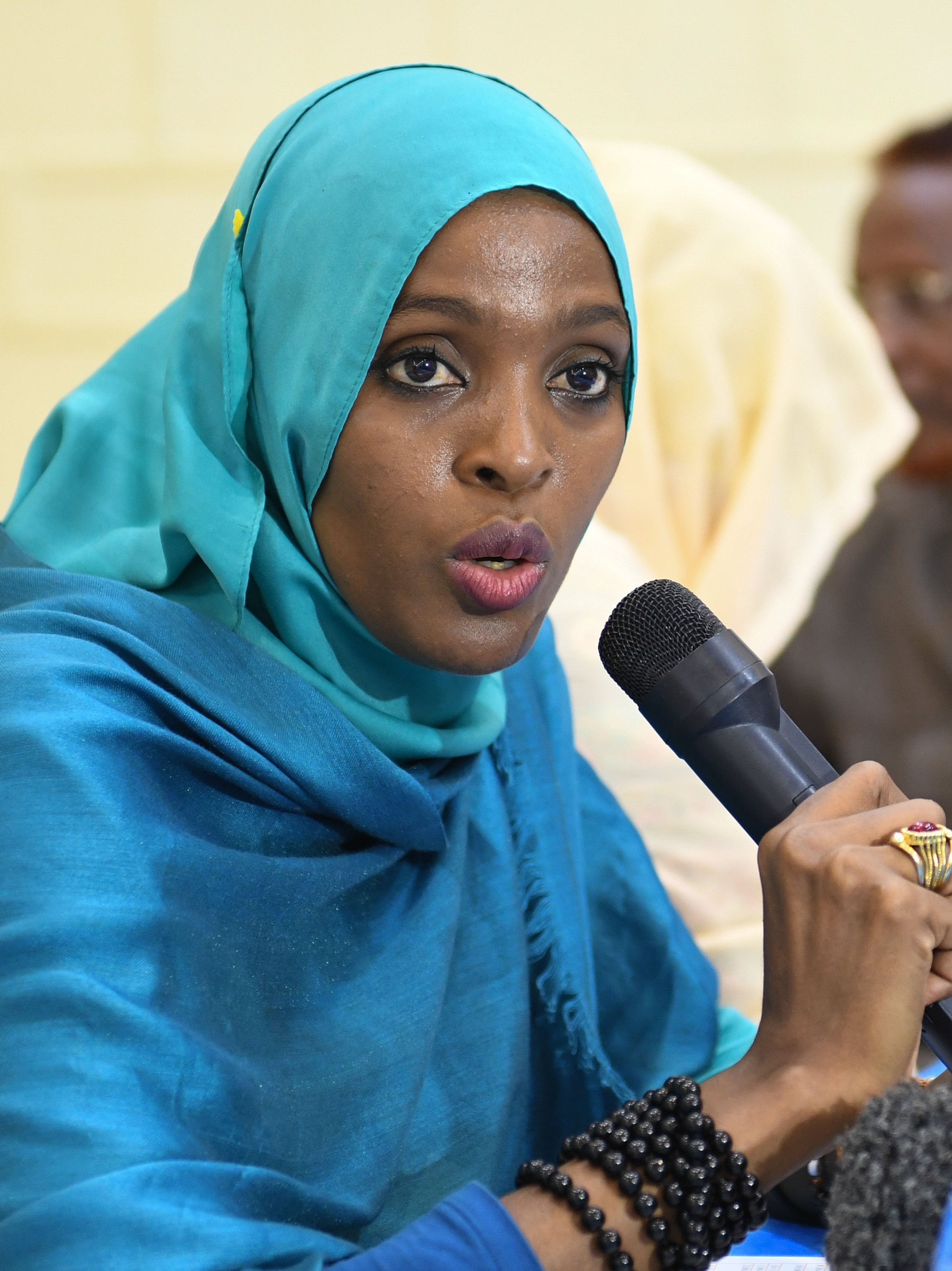
- Ahmed in 2017
- Born: 1989 (age 36–37); Mogadishu, Somalia
- Occupation: activist
- Title: United Youth of Ireland/ Ifrah Foundation

Ifrah Ahmed (Somali: Ifraax Axmed, Arabic: إفراح أحمد) is a Somali-Irish social activist. She is the founder of the United Youth of Ireland non-governmental organization and the Ifrah Foundation.

== Biography ==
Ifrah Ahmed was born in Mogadishu, Somalia in 1989. At the age of eight years old, Ahmed underwent enforced circumcision at the hands of a family member who was a licensed doctor. It was during the Ethiopian War that Ahmed retreated from Somalia to Ireland at the age of 17. She evaded traffickers and was granted refugee status in Ireland in 2006.

Upon her arrival, Ahmed underwent a mandatory medical check where healthcare professionals insisted on performing a pap smear. Speaking limited English at the time, Ahmed struggled to communicate her situation with the medical staff, who prior to that day had never dealt with any cases of Female Genital Mutilation (FGM). At that time, whilst living amongst other refugees in a hostel, Ahmed relived her past trauma connected to FGM when she asked the other women about their experiences. Ahmed became shocked by the realization that FGM was not a common practice in Ireland, as it was so normalized back in Somalia. This compelled her to go back to school to expand her education in order to better publicly speak and address the issue of FGM. In the years to follow Ifrah Ahmed would become the first woman to share her testimony about having experienced female genital mutilation to the public.

== Career ==
=== Ifrah Foundation ===
Ahmed established the United Youth of Ireland (2010), an NGO for young immigrants, and the Ifrah Foundation, which is devoted to eliminating female genital mutilation (FGM).

The Ifrah Foundation is a registered charity in both Ireland and Somalia. Through Ahmed's Foundation, she continues to advocate for the eradication of FGM in her native Somalia. Her work includes raising awareness through producing media content to highlight the negative impact of FGM. In July 2018, in collaboration with the Global Media Campaign to end FGM, Ahmed produced a short documentary on the death of 10-year-old girl due to complication resulting from FGM. The Ifrah Foundation has partnered on impactful projects with international NGOs, and has formed strategic partnerships with governmental agencies on policy and legislation.

The foundations vision is of “the absolute abandonment of FGM in Somalia and the horn of Africa [...]”. On their website they state that this will be achieved through “sustained engagement with Government and strategic partners, in [the] key areas of action: Advocacy, Awareness and Community Empowerment”. The Foundation has partnered with many projects to deliver significant results with international NGOs in East Africa such as Amnesty International, UNICEF, and UNFPA, and has many strong, strategic partnerships with governmental agencies on policy and legislation. They have worked at ministerial levels, with religious leaders, international media experts, and grassroots organizations to promote community empowerment and education.

=== United Youth of Ireland ===
The non-governmental United Youth of Ireland provides support to young immigrants in their business, artistic and creative pursuits. The goal was to “steal the hearts of young people.”

=== FGM bill ===
In 2001, a bill had been tabled by the Irish government to ban FGM nationally, but the government had yet to take any action, leading Ahmed to step up and make a change. With the United Youth of Ireland, she started a beauty pageant called Ms. Ethnic Ireland, a contest to celebrate diversity, raise awareness of FGM, and address the issues that immigrants have in integrating into Irish culture. Ahmed received backlash from members of the Somali community who still supported the practice, but she continued to speak out. That same year, Ahmed continued the fight through the creation of the Ifrah Foundation, an anti-FGM organization. Through her activism and with the help of Labour TD Joe Costello, Ahmed was successful in getting FGM banned in Ireland in 2012.

=== In Somalia ===
Ahmed has also tackled FGM in her home country of Somalia. The former Somali minister of women and human rights met with Ahmed while at a conference in the European Union, and asked Ahmed to work at the Ministry of women to develop child rights programs, including the ratification of female genital mutilation. Ahmed was also supported by subsequent Ministers of Women. Backed by these women and other key government ministers, she was able to promote the prevention of FGM directly with communities and religious leaders. Supported by Amison and the University of Mogadishu, Ahmed led conventions and symposiums to provide education and awareness. Ahmed is now the Gender Coordinator on behalf of the Somali government, and the Gender Advisor to the President of Somalia. Along with that, Ahmed is also the Human Rights advisor to the Somali government. Ifrah initiated an eighteen-month comprehensive research study into the status of FGM in Somalia and authored the methodology for the National Action Plan FGM abandonment in Somalia. With the public support of the prime minister, who moved to pass legislation to end the practice, aid groups on the ground in Somalia were able to partner with Ifrah Foundation and the government to implement a nation-wide FGM abandonment program. Ahmed has also coordinated the Global Media Campaign Media Training Academy in Mogadishu.

In 2016, she was appointed Gender Advisor to the Prime Minister of Somalia

=== Other roles ===
Additionally, Ahmed has been involved in organizing various events, workshops, fundraisers and seminars. In 2014, she was also a guest speaker in support of the documentary Girl Rising by Richard E. Robbins. The showcase was part of the Development Film Series held at the University College Dublin.

== Media portrayal ==
A biopic about Ahmed, A Girl from Mogadishu, starring Aja Naomi King and Barkhad Abdi was in production, shooting in Ireland and Morocco and premiered at the Edinburgh Film Festival in Scotland.

It was a difficult process to open up and share such intimate details of her life and her story with the film's director, Mary McGuckian, and scriptwriter, and later, with the world. But Ahmed wanted other people who had suffered from FGM to feel less alone after experiencing the film. Ahmed also composed a short documentary that follows the story of a ten-year-old girl, Deequq, who bled to death due to her own FGM. Shortly after the story went viral, other parents began to take their daughters to hospitals after being cut to prevent the same horrible experience. Ahmed herself helped to facilitate the medical care of many of these girls and was able to save twenty girls from bleeding. The worldwide traction of this documentary helped steer Somalia's Attorney General to commit the country's very first prosecution of FGM.

== Awards ==
- In 2015, Ifrah has won Humanitarian of the Year award by Women4Africa Award.
- In 2018, she was awarded with a People of the Year Award for her work.

== Bibliography ==
- Ahmed, I. (2016). Ifrah Ahmed: helping Somalia's government end FGM. The Guardian.
- Cormaic, R. M. (2016). African activists meet in Wicklow to discuss end to FGM. The Irish Times.
- Ferguson, D. (2019). How Ifrah Ahmed, the girl from Mogadishu, took her FGM story to the world. The Guardian.
- Hitchings-Hales, J. (2020). FGM Survivor Ifrah Ahmed on Hozier's ‘Cry Power’ Podcast: ‘I Was Told I Was Going to Be Killed’. Global Citizen. Retrieved from: https://www.globalcitizen.org/en/content/hozier-cry-power-podcast-ifrah-ahmed-fgm/
- n.a. (2020). Ifrah Ahmed. HERstory. Retrieved from: https://www.herstory.ie/contemporary/2020/2/4/ifrah-ahmed
- n.a. (2020). Leave the girls alone. The Irish World.
- n.a. (n.d.). About Ifrah Foundation. Ifrah Foundation.
