= Female genital mutilation in the United States =

Occurrence and regulation of FGM in the US

Types of FGM

Female genital mutilation (FGM), also known as female circumcision or female genital cutting, includes any procedure involving the removal or injury of part or all of the vulva for non-medical reasons. While the practice is most common in Islamic populations in Africa, Asia, and the Middle East, FGM is also widespread in immigrant communities and metropolitan areas in the United States, and was performed by some doctors regularly until the 1980s. Additionally, some Christian cults have also performed the practice on women to prevent masturbation, though this is rare.

There are four main types of FGM, distinguished by the World Health Organization by their severity. Type 1, clitoridectomy, describes the partial or total removal of the clitoris, and includes circumcision (removal of just the clitoral hood) and clitoridectomy (removal of the entire clitoral glans and hood). Type 2, excision, involves the partial or total removal of the clitoris and labia minora, with or without the additional removal of the labia majora. Type 3, infibulation, is the most severe type of FGM. It describes the narrowing of the vaginal opening through creation of a seal, by cutting and repositioning the labia minora or labia majora. Type 4 describes any other type of harmful non-medical procedures performed on female genitalia, including cutting, burning, and scraping.

In the United States, FGM is most common in immigrant communities and in major metropolitan areas. Data on the prevalence of FGM in the United States was first collected in 1990, using census information. CDC reports using information from the early 2010-2013 have shown a decrease in FGM in the United States, although growing levels of immigration cause numbers to appear higher.

In addition to its prevalence in immigrant communities in the US, FGM was considered a standard medical procedure in America for most of the 19th and 20th centuries. Physicians performed surgeries of varying invasiveness to treat a number of diagnoses, including hysteria, depression, nymphomania, and frigidity as well as to discourage masturbation. The medicalization of FGM in the United States allowed these practices to continue until the end of the 20th century, with some procedures covered by Blue Cross Blue Shield Insurance until 1977.

With the passage of the federal law ban, the Female Genital Mutilation Act, in 1996, performing FGM on anyone under age 18 became a felony in the United States. However, in 2018, the act was struck down as unconstitutional by US federal district judge Bernard A. Friedman in Michigan, who argued that the federal government did not have authority to enact legislation outside the "Interstate commerce" clause. As part of the ruling, Friedman also ordered that charges be dropped against 8 people who had mutilated the genitals of 9 girls. The Department of Justice decided not to appeal the ruling; however, the US House of Representatives appealed it. In 2021, the STOP FGM Act of 2020 was signed into law, and it gives federal authorities the power to prosecute those who carry out or conspire to carry out FGM, as well as increasing the maximum prison sentence from five to ten years. It also requires government agencies to report to Congress about the estimated number of women and girls who are at risk of or have had FGM, and on efforts to prevent FGM.

As of August 2026, 42 U.S. states have made specific laws that prohibit FGM, while the remaining eight states have no specific laws against FGM. The US has also participated in several UN resolutions that advocate for the eradication of FGM, including the UN's 1948 Universal Declaration of Human Rights, 1989 Convention on the Rights of the Child, and the Convention on the Elimination of All Forms of Discrimination Against Women (CEDAW).

== Prevalence ==
World prevalence rates of FGM according to the 2020 Global Response report. Grey countries' data are not covered.

The current prevalence of FGM in the US is uncertain. In early 2014, Equality Now campaigned with survivor and activist Jaha Dukureh, Representatives Joseph Crowley (D-NY) and Sheila Jackson Lee (D-TX), and The Guardian to petition the Obama Administration to conduct a new prevalence study into the current state of FGM in the U.S. as the first step towards its elimination.

In 1996, the first report on FGM in the United States was developed using data from the 1990 census. It reported that 168,000 girls and women were at risk, with 48,000 under 18. In 2004, the African Women's Health Center at Brigham and Women's Hospital and the PRC revamped these numbers with information from recent surveys and the 2000 U.S. census. They reported 227,887 girls and women at risk in United States, with 62,519 under 18. This increase can be attributed to increases in total immigration.

In 2016, the Centers for Disease Control and Prevention (CDC) released a report compiled with data from 2010-2013. The CDC report estimated 513,000 girls and women in the United States were either victims of FGM or at risk of FGM, with a third under age 18. The marked increase in the number of girls and women at risk of FGM in the United States was attributed to an increase in the total number of immigrants from countries where FGM is most common, not an increase in the frequency of the practice. Of the women at risk, 60% are from 8 states: California, Maryland, Minnesota, New Jersey, New York, Texas, Virginia, and Washington. Additionally, 40% of those reported are concentrated in 5 major metropolitan areas: New York, Washington, Minneapolis-St. Paul, Los Angeles, and Seattle. 55% of the women are from Egypt, Somalia, or Ethiopia. These three "sending countries" have a high prevalence of FGM, as well as high numbers of U.S. immigrants. The report used information from US census reports and the American Community Survey (2012) to identify the number of immigrants from countries where FGM is most prevalent.

FGM in the United States is commonly associated with African and Asian migrants with an Islamic cultural background, including the small Dawoodi Bohra Muslim community that has its roots in India. It has also anecdotally been found to occur in some local white conservative Christian communities in the American Midwest (as of June 2019, two white women from conservative Christian homes in North Dakota and Kentucky had come forward), where female sexual pleasure is believed to be a "sin against God", and FGM is employed as a way to make women "obedient to God" and their husbands.

== History ==
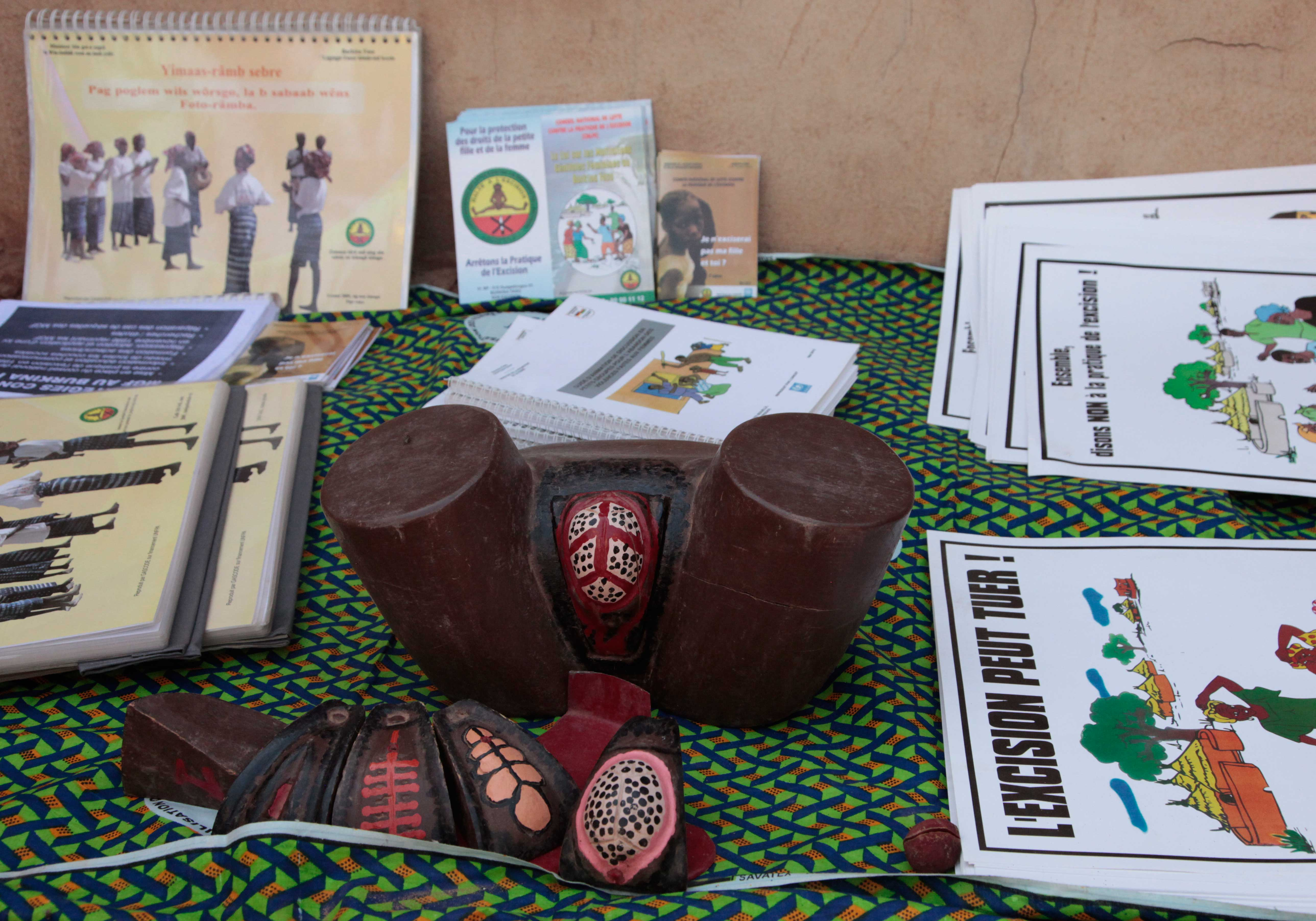
Tools used in education and community outreach

During the 19th century, FGM was frequently performed by doctors as a treatment for many sexual and psychological conditions. During the 19th and 20th centuries, the clitoris was considered the center of female sexuality. In addition, Victorian concepts of female sexuality resulted in a widely held belief that women were less sexual than men. Female sexuality was typically thought of only within the constructs of heterosexual marriage, and behaviors that strayed from this schema, such as masturbation, were deemed symptomatic, and often resulted in operation on the clitoris.

Depending on the symptoms and diagnosis, physicians performed four different procedures of varying invasiveness on women. Doctors would either remove the smegma surrounding the clitoris, lacerate adhesions restricting the clitoris, or remove the clitoral hood altogether (female circumcision). In the most extreme cases, doctors would perform a clitoridectomy, removing the clitoris entirely.

Reflex neurosis was a common diagnosis in the 19th century. Characterized by excessive nervous stimulation, this condition could often manifest in an overstimulation of the clitoris that women would attempt to quell with masturbation. Women diagnosed with reflex neurosis were often circumcised in an effort to remove the irritant.

From the 1880s to 1950s, excision was often performed to prevent and treat lesbianism, masturbation, depression, hysteria, and nymphomania. These procedures continued well into the 1970s, and were covered by Blue Cross Blue Shield Insurance until 1977.

Dr. James Burt, a physician from Ohio, performed a so-called "surgery of love" on over 170 women throughout the 1960s and 1970s. During the non-consensual procedure, Burt would cut around, move, and reshape the clitoris of women who had been admitted for other operations. This continued well into the 1970s, when a former co-worker served witness to several of Burt's victims, and he was fired and cast out of the medical community.

== Legislative framework ==
=== Federal and state policy ===
As of August 2026, 42 states, most recently, Connecticut, had passed legislation making FGM illegal. Several of these states passed legislation that made it illegal to perform FGM on anyone (not just girls under 18). As of 2026, eight states (Alabama, Alaska, Hawaii, Maine, Mississippi, Montana, Nebraska, and New Mexico) have no specific laws against FGM.

The U.S. Congress required the Department of Health and Human Services to provide information for medical students about treatment recommendations. Education policy was also included in the Illegal Immigration Reform and Immigrant Responsibility Act of 1996. The IIRARA mandated that visa recipients from 28 high-risk countries receive culturally appropriate information on the personal and legal repercussions of FGM in the United States at or before the time of entry.

Prior to the Act being declared unconstitutional, FGM on anyone under the age of 18 had become a felony in the United States with the passage of the Female Genital Mutilation Act of 1996. The law was introduced by former congresswoman Pat Schroeder in October 1993. The Female Genital Mutilation Act included education and community outreach programs that provide information about the physical and emotional harm caused by FGM.

On November 20, 2018, Federal Judge Barnard A. Friedman ruled the Female Genital Mutilation Act of 1996 unconstitutional because it exceeds the enumerated powers of Congress and cannot be justified by the commerce clause. The Department of Justice decided not to appeal the ruling, but the US House of Representatives appealed it.

However, in January 2021 the STOP FGM Act of 2020 was signed into law by then president Donald Trump, and it mostly reenacts the previous law but emphasizes the commercial aspect of FGM markets. It gives federal authorities the power to prosecute those who carry out or conspire to carry out FGM, as well as increasing the maximum prison sentence from five to ten years. It also requires government agencies to report to Congress about the estimated number of women and girls who are at risk of or have had FGM, and on efforts to prevent FGM.

In 2013, the Transport for Female Genital Mutilation Act specifically prohibited the practice of "vacation cutting", the transport of a girl outside of the United States with the intention of performing FGM.

=== International policy ===
In addition to policies within the U.S., FGM has been condemned by international organizations and bodies that the U.S. is a part of. The UN's 1948 Universal Declaration of Human Rights and 1989 Convention on the Rights of the Child both include statements against the practice of FGM. In 1979, the Convention on the Elimination of All Forms of Discrimination Against Women (CEDAW) required participating State parties to work to "abolish customs and practices which constitute discrimination against women". In 1990, CEDAW's General Recommendation 14 included many suggested actions for participating State parties to eradicate FGM, including the collection of data on the prevalence of FGM, education and outreach programs to prevent and discourage FGM, incorporating information on the eradication of FGM into public health programs, and encouraging politicians and public figures to speak out against FGM. In 1999, CEDAW's General Recommendation recommended that participating State parties enact laws to prohibit FGM. In 2007, the United Nations Children's Emergency Fund (UNICEF) and the United Nations Population Fund (UNPF) created a joint UN initiative with the goal of ending FGM within a generation. In 2015, the UN's Sustainable Development Goals included the end of practices that prevent gender equality, including FGM.

=== Prosecutions ===
The first conviction of FGM in the US occurred in 2006. Khalid Adem, an Ethiopian American, was both the first person prosecuted and first person convicted for FGM in the United States. Adem, an Ethiopian immigrant, circumcised his two-year-old daughter with a pair of scissors. He was found guilty of aggravated battery and cruelty to children by the State of Georgia, which had no specific law on FGM at the time. In 2010, Georgia successfully passed a law criminalizing FGM.

In April 2017, Jumana Nagarwala, a doctor working at the Henry Ford Hospital in Detroit, was charged with allegedly performing FGM at the Burhani Medical Clinic in Livonia, Michigan. This was the first federal prosecution for female genital mutilation in US history. Nagarwala, who denied the charges, was accused of performing FGM on two girls who had traveled from Minnesota with their mothers. The owners of the clinic where it was performed, Dr. Fakhruddin Attar and his wife, Farida Attar, were also arrested and charged with FGM for conspiring with Nagarwala and letting her use their clinic. But when the 1996 federal law that criminalized female genital mutilation was declared unconstitutional in 2018, all charges against the Attars and Nagarwala other than conspiracy and obstruction were dismissed.

In 2021 it was announced that Zahra Badri had become the first person to have charges brought against them by the Justice Department for transporting a child outside the borders of America to have FGM performed on them (the charge referred to actions taken from approximately July 10, 2016 through October 14, 2016).

=== Asylum ===
In 1996, Fauziya Kasinga was granted political asylum by the United States Board of Immigration Appeals. Kasinga, a 19-year-old member of the Tchamba-Kunsuntu tribe of Togo, was granted asylum on the grounds that she would be at risk of FGM if she returned to her arranged marriage in Togo. This set a precedent in U.S. immigration law because it was the first time FGM was accepted as a form of persecution. In addition, this was the first situation in which asylum was granted based on gender.

== Controversy ==
=== American Academy of Pediatrics ===
In 2010, the American Academy of Pediatrics came under fire for advising doctors to consider offering patients the option of "a ritual nick as a possible compromise to avoid greater harm". The Academy stated that although harmful genital mutilation is illegal in the United States, physicians could consider this option in countries where FGM is more widely practiced. This advice appeared in a journal section entitled, "Education of patients and parents". After facing backlash from medical institutions worldwide, the AAP retracted their statement. The organization also subsequently clarified in a statement released in May 2010 that it "opposes all types of female genital cutting", and "counsels its members not to perform such procedures".

== See also ==
- Female genital mutilation laws by country
- Prevalence of female genital mutilation by country
