= Allow Me to Reintroduce Myself (Scandal) =

- Scandal episode
- Episode no.: Season 7 Episode 12
- Directed by: Tony Goldwyn
- Written by: Raamla Mohamed
- Cinematography by: Oliver Bokelberg
- Editing by: Christal A. Khatib
- Original air date: March 1, 2018
- Running time: 43 minutes

Guest appearances
- Viola Davis as Annalise Keating (special guest star); Aja Naomi King as Michaela Pratt; Tom Irwin as Justice Mark Spivey; Julie Claire as Francesca Hunter; Jay Jackson as Mike Waters; Sumalee Montano as Audrey Campo

Episode chronology
← Previous "Army of One"	Next → "Air Force Two"
- Scandal (season 7)

"Allow Me to Reintroduce Myself" is the twelfth episode of the seventh season of the American political drama television series Scandal. The 118th episode overall, it was written by Raamla Mohamed and directed by Tony Goldwyn. A crossover with the legal drama series How to Get Away with Murder, the installment aired on March 1, 2018, on ABC, before "Lahey v. Commonwealth of Pennsylvania", the thirteenth episode of the fourth season of How to Get Away with Murder.

In the crossover, Annalise Keating (Viola Davis) teams up with Olivia Pope (Kerry Washington) to work up a class action regarding the mass incarceration of black people in the United States, whilst Annalise faces her own trauma. How to Get Away with Murder actress Aja Naomi King guest stars in the episode alongside Davis.

== Plot ==
After her dismissal from the White House, Olivia serves as a guest lecturer at a local university. Annalise Keating, a defense attorney, asks for her help with her class action. At first, Olivia turns down the offer due to the questionable reputation of Annalise, but softens up shortly after. The duo get in touch with Fitz in order to gain mileage. Meanwhile, Mellie and Jake try their best to postpone if not sabotage the case through QPA, leaking the reason Olivia lost her post as Chief of Staff. With everything seeming to hit a dead end, Olivia and Annalise decide to work by themselves without any help from the White House. After watching a televised interview of Olivia and Annalise, Quinn has a change of heart, offering the "dirt" she has on Justice Spivey and prompting her to persuade (possibly blackmail) the judge into changing his vote. The class action suit is added to the court docket, much to Mellie's dismay.

== Production ==
On January 3, 2018, Kerry Washington tweeted a photo to How to Get Away with Murder star Viola Davis of herself in a "familiar" setting, that being a courthouse used for the set of How to Get Away with Murder. Fans began to speculate a possible crossover episode being in the works, which was only heightened when Davis tweeted out a photo in response, that being her on the set of the fictitious Oval Office from Scandal. Later that day, the crossover was officially confirmed through a tweet by Scandal creator and How to Get Away with Murder executive producer Shonda Rhimes. How to Get Away with Murder creator Peter Nowalk later went on to share in an interview with Deadline:

At the beginning of the season, my writers and I were planning out Viola's entire arc and something in her story organically came up that was very appropriate for Scandal. When I went to Shonda, she heard it. I said, we don't have to do it, Viola's arc doesn't need this, but it's possible that their stories could cross really organically. She actually pulled up a clip of something from Scandal and their side of the story coalesced perfectly. So it was one of those serendipitous things where we both realized it was good for both characters, and it almost felt like we had been planning it since last season.

"Allow Me to Reintroduce Myself" was written by Raamla Mohamed and directed by Tony Goldwyn. It featured the songs "In My House" by Mary Jane Girls and "Hung Over" by the Martinis. Liza Weil, who portrayed Amanda Tanner on the first season of Scandal, is also a series regular on How to Get Away with Murder, playing Bonnie Winterbottom. Nowalk said that he and Rhimes decided to ignore the continuity error and hoped that audiences wouldn't be confused and able to separate Weil's performances as both characters. Winterbottom did not appear in the Scandal half of the crossover, and Weil did not appear as Bonnie with any Scandal characters on-screen during the How to Get Away with Murder half, ultimately making any narrative confusion moot.

== Reception ==
=== Viewers ===
In its original American broadcast, "Allow Me to Reintroduce Myself" was seen by an estimated 4.95 million household viewers and gained a 1.2/5 ratings share among adults aged 18–49, according to Nielsen Media Research. This means that 1.2 percent of all households with televisions watched the episode, while 5 percent of all households watching television at that time watched it. This was a 7% increase in viewership from the previous episode, which was watched by 4.64 million viewers with a 1.1/4 in the 18-49 demographics. The installment attached 2.73 million DVR viewers, summing up 7.70 million viewers.

=== Critical response ===
Joshua Alston of Vulture praised the episode, complimenting the well-done mixing of both series' mythologies. He asked for a crossover season and wrote, "[the episode] doesn't feel nearly as much like a stunt as it actually is. It has strong thematic links to both shows and never feels like it's playing fast and loose with Scandal's mythology to accommodate the new guests. Honestly, neither Scandal nor HTGAWM has been this fun or felt this vital in a really long time." Ashley Ray-Harris of The A.V. Club called it a "fun fan-bait episode". Writing for E! Online, Lauren Piester declared the crossover "felt just right", commenting, "In the end, it's kind of a shame this didn't happen earlier and that it can't happen again. Annalise and Olivia are strangely natural together, and that girl power is pretty undeniable." Refinery29's Ariana Romero noted the importance of two black actresses sharing television screen time and praised the dynamics between Annalise and Olivia.
