= List of How to Get Away with Murder episodes =

How to Get Away with Murder is an American legal drama television series that premiered on ABC on September 25, 2014. The series follows Annalise Keating, a law professor and criminal defense attorney at Middleton University, who selects five interns to work in her law firm: Wes Gibbins, Connor Walsh, Michaela Pratt, Asher Millstone, and Laurel Castillo – alongside Annalise's employees Frank Delfino and Bonnie Winterbottom, an associate lawyer. With the exception of the pilot, every episode's title is a phrase said by one of the characters in that episode.

The first season initially had an order of thirteen episodes, but ABC ordered a full season for the series with an additional two episodes after the first episode aired and was the top series debut of the season. On May 7, 2015, the show was renewed for a second season, which consisted of fifteen episodes like the previous season. March 3, 2016, ABC announced that the show was renewed for a third season. On February 10, 2017, ABC renewed the show for a fourth season. On May 11, 2018, ABC announced the show was officially renewed for a fifth season. On May 10, 2019, the series was renewed for a sixth season. On July 11, 2019, it was announced the sixth season would be the last.

During the course of the series, 90 episodes of How to Get Away with Murder aired, between September 25, 2014, and May 14, 2020.

== Series overview ==
Season	Episodes	Originally released		Rank	Viewers (in millions)
Season	Episodes	First released	Last released	Rank	Viewers (in millions)
1	15	September 25, 2014	February 26, 2015	30	11.40
2	15	September 24, 2015	March 17, 2016	32	10.26
3	15	September 22, 2016	February 23, 2017	44	7.91
4	15	September 28, 2017	March 15, 2018	64	6.42
5	15	September 27, 2018	February 28, 2019	85	5.15
6	15	September 26, 2019	May 14, 2020	84	4.27

== Episodes ==
=== Season 1 (2014–15) ===
No. overall	No. in season	Title	Directed by	Written by	Original release date	U.S. viewers (millions)
1	1	"Pilot"	Michael Offer	Peter Nowalk	September 25, 2014	14.12
2	2	"It's All Her Fault"	Bill D'Elia	Peter Nowalk	October 2, 2014	11.94
3	3	"Smile, or Go to Jail"	Randy Zisk	Rob Fresco	October 9, 2014	10.81
4	4	"Let's Get to Scooping"	Laura Innes	Erika Green Swafford	October 16, 2014	9.79
5	5	"We're Not Friends"	Mike Listo	Tracey A. Bellomo	October 23, 2014	9.97
6	6	"Freakin' Whack-a-Mole"	Bill D'Elia	Michael Foley	October 30, 2014	8.68
7	7	"He Deserved to Die"	Eric Stoltz	Warren Hsu Leonard	November 6, 2014	9.18
8	8	"He Has a Wife"	Debbie Allen	Doug Stockstill	November 13, 2014	9.25
9	9	"Kill Me, Kill Me, Kill Me"	Stephen Williams	Michael Foley & Erika Green Swafford	November 20, 2014	9.82
10	10	"Hello Raskolnikov"	Michael Offer	Marcus Dalzine	January 29, 2015	9.18
11	11	"Best Christmas Ever"	Michael Katleman	Tracy A. Bellomo & Warren Hsu Leonard	February 5, 2015	8.34
12	12	"She's a Murderer"	Bill D'Elia	Erika Harrison	February 12, 2015	8.44
13	13	"Mama's Here Now"	Mike Listo	Erika Green Swafford & Doug Stockstill	February 19, 2015	8.86
14	14	"The Night Lila Died"	Laura Innes	Michael Foley	February 26, 2015	8.99
15	15	"It's All My Fault"	Bill D'Elia	Peter Nowalk	February 26, 2015	8.99

=== Season 2 (2015–16) ===
No. overall	No. in season	Title	Directed by	Written by	Original release date	U.S. viewers (millions)
16	1	"It's Time to Move On"	Bill D'Elia	Peter Nowalk	September 24, 2015	8.38
17	2	"She's Dying"	Rob Hardy	Erika Green Swafford	October 1, 2015	7.53
18	3	"It's Called the Octopus"	John Terlesky	Joe Fazzio	October 8, 2015	7.22
19	4	"Skanks Get Shanked"	Stephen Williams	Angela Robinson	October 15, 2015	6.81
20	5	"Meet Bonnie"	Stephen Cragg	Sarah L. Thompson	October 22, 2015	6.95
21	6	"Two Birds, One Millstone"	Mike Listo	Michael Foley	October 29, 2015	6.27
22	7	"I Want You to Die"	Kevin Bray	Warren Hsu Leonard	November 5, 2015	6.49
23	8	"Hi, I'm Philip"	Jennifer Getzinger	Tanya Saracho	November 12, 2015	6.71
24	9	"What Did We Do?"	Bill D'Elia	Michael Foley & Erika Green Swafford	November 19, 2015	7.19
25	10	"What Happened to You, Annalise?"	Laura Innes	J. C. Lee	February 11, 2016	5.82
26	11	"She Hates Us"	Bill D'Elia	Erika Harrison	February 18, 2016	4.88
27	12	"It's a Trap"	Mike Listo	Joe Fazzio & Tanya Saracho	February 25, 2016	4.86
28	13	"Something Bad Happened"	Zetna Fuentes	Michael Foley & Warren Hsu Leonard	March 3, 2016	4.53
29	14	"There's My Baby"	Stephen Williams	J.C. Lee & Erika Harrison	March 10, 2016	4.80
30	15	"Anna Mae"	Bill D'Elia	Peter Nowalk	March 17, 2016	5.29

=== Season 3 (2016–17) ===
No. overall	No. in season	Title	Directed by	Written by	Original release date	U.S. viewers (millions)
31	1	"We're Good People Now"	Bill D'Elia	Peter Nowalk	September 22, 2016	5.11
32	2	"There Are Worse Things Than Murder"	Zetna Fuentes	Angela Robinson	September 29, 2016	4.33
33	3	"Always Bet Black"	Stephen Cragg	Joe Fazzio	October 6, 2016	4.40
34	4	"Don't Tell Annalise"	Kevin Rodney Sullivan	Erika Green Swafford	October 13, 2016	4.00
35	5	"It's About Frank"	Jann Turner	J. C. Lee	October 20, 2016	4.29
36	6	"Is Someone Really Dead?"	Sharat Raju	Fernanda Coppel	October 27, 2016	4.07
37	7	"Call It Mother's Intuition"	Mike Smith	Erika Harrison	November 3, 2016	4.08
38	8	"No More Blood"	Jet Wilkinson	Morenike Balogun	November 10, 2016	4.32
39	9	"Who's Dead?"	Bill D'Elia	Michael Foley	November 17, 2016	4.95
40	10	"We're Bad People"	Jennifer Getzinger	Sarah L. Thompson	January 26, 2017	5.41
41	11	"Not Everything's About Annalise"	Nicole Rubio	Abby Ajayi	February 2, 2017	4.69
42	12	"Go Cry Somewhere Else"	Cherie Nowlan	Daniel Robinson	February 9, 2017	4.92
43	13	"It's War"	Hanelle Culpepper	Brendan Kelly	February 16, 2017	4.66
44	14	"He Made a Terrible Mistake"	Jet Wilkinson	Joe Fazzio	February 23, 2017	4.92
45	15	"Wes"	Bill D'Elia	Peter Nowalk	February 23, 2017	4.92

=== Season 4 (2017–18) ===
No. overall	No. in season	Title	Directed by	Written by	Original release date	U.S. viewers (millions)
46	1	"I'm Going Away"	Jet Wilkinson	Peter Nowalk	September 28, 2017	3.96
47	2	"I'm Not Her"	Paris Barclay	Maya Goldsmith	October 5, 2017	3.88
48	3	"It's for the Greater Good"	Nicole Rubio	Erika Harrison	October 12, 2017	3.88
49	4	"Was She Ever Good at Her Job?"	Mike Smith	Michael Russo	October 19, 2017	3.56
50	5	"I Love Her"	Lexi Alexander	Sarah L. Thompson	October 26, 2017	3.56
51	6	"Stay Strong, Mama"	Cherie Nowlan	Morenike Balogun	November 2, 2017	3.56
52	7	"Nobody Roots for Goliath"	Nzingha Stewart	Daniel Robinson	November 9, 2017	3.71
53	8	"Live. Live. Live."	Rob Hardy	Joe Fazzio	November 16, 2017	3.72
54	9	"He's Dead"	Jet Wilkinson	Abby Ajayi	January 18, 2018	3.80
55	10	"Everything We Did Was for Nothing"	Jonathan Brown	Matthew Cruz	January 25, 2018	3.54
56	11	"He's a Bad Father"	Marta Cunningham	Maya Goldsmith	February 1, 2018	3.68
57	12	"Ask Him About Stella"	Stephen Cragg	Tess Leibowitz	February 8, 2018	3.26
58	13	"Lahey v. Commonwealth of Pennsylvania"	Zetna Fuentes	Morenike Balogun & Sarah L. Thompson	March 1, 2018	4.14
59	14	"The Day Before He Died"	Scott Printz	Joe Fazzio	March 8, 2018	3.36
60	15	"Nobody Else Is Dying"	Jet Wilkinson	Peter Nowalk	March 15, 2018	3.83

=== Season 5 (2018–19) ===
No. overall	No. in season	Title	Directed by	Written by	Original release date	U.S. viewers (millions)
61	1	"Your Funeral"	Stephen Cragg	Peter Nowalk	September 27, 2018	2.93
62	2	"Whose Blood Is That?"	Mike Smith	Sarah L. Thompson	October 4, 2018	3.02
63	3	"The Baby Was Never Dead"	Valerie Weiss	Erika Harrison	October 11, 2018	3.22
64	4	"It's Her Kid"	Cherie Nowlan	Maisha Closson	October 18, 2018	2.74
65	5	"It Was the Worst Day of My Life"	Laura Innes	Michael Russo	October 25, 2018	2.93
66	6	"We Can Find Him"	Jonathan Brown	Tess Leibowitz	November 1, 2018	2.86
67	7	"I Got Played"	Eric Laneuville	Maya Goldsmith	November 8, 2018	3.02
68	8	"I Want to Love You Until the Day I Die"	Stephen Cragg	Joe Fazzio	November 15, 2018	3.13
69	9	"He Betrayed Us Both"	John Terlesky	Daniel Robinson	January 17, 2019	2.84
70	10	"Don't Go Dark on Me"	Cherie Nowlan	Sara Rose Feinberg	January 24, 2019	2.74
71	11	"Be the Martyr"	Alrick Riley	Matthew Cruz	January 31, 2019	2.58
72	12	"We Know Everything"	Jennifer Getzinger	Michael Russo & Sarah L. Thompson	February 7, 2019	2.74
73	13	"Where Are Your Parents?"	DeMane Davis	Maya Goldsmith & Daniel Robinson	February 14, 2019	2.57
74	14	"Make Me the Enemy"	Mike Smith	Erika Harrison & Matthew Cruz	February 21, 2019	2.56
75	15	"Please Say No One Else Is Dead"	Stephen Cragg	Joe Fazzio	February 28, 2019	2.76

=== Season 6 (2019–20) ===
No. overall	No. in season	Title	Directed by	Written by	Original release date	U.S. viewers (millions)
76	1	"Say Goodbye"	Stephen Cragg	Sarah L. Thompson	September 26, 2019	2.43
77	2	"Vivian's Here"	Mike Smith	Michael Russo	October 3, 2019	2.56
78	3	"Do You Think I'm a Bad Man?"	Catriona McKenzie	Daniel Robinson	October 10, 2019	2.23
79	4	"I Hate the World"	Scott Printz	Matthew Cruz	October 17, 2019	2.10
80	5	"We're All Gonna Die"	Felix Alcala	Sara Rose Feinberg	October 24, 2019	2.25
81	6	"Family Sucks"	Laura Innes	Vanessa James Benton	October 31, 2019	2.16
82	7	"I'm the Murderer"	Lily Mariye	Laurence Andries	November 7, 2019	2.21
83	8	"I Want to Be Free"	Alrick Riley	Hadi Nicholas Deeb	November 14, 2019	2.28
84	9	"Are You the Mole?"	Stephen Cragg	Maisha Closson	November 21, 2019	2.16
85	10	"We're Not Getting Away With It"	Sheelin Choksey	Tess Leibowitz	April 2, 2020	2.91
86	11	"The Reckoning"	DeMane Davis	Inda Craig-Galván	April 9, 2020	2.78
87	12	"Let's Hurt Him"	Janice Cooke	Daniel Robinson & Matthew Cruz	April 16, 2020	2.81
88	13	"What If Sam Wasn't the Bad Guy This Whole Time?"	Dawn Wilkinson	Ricardo C. Lira	April 30, 2020	2.77
89	14	"Annalise Keating Is Dead"	John Terlesky	Sarah L. Thompson & Tess Leibowitz	May 7, 2020	2.69
90	15	"Stay"	Stephen Cragg	Peter Nowalk	May 14, 2020	3.20

== Ratings ==
How to Get Away with Murder : U.S. viewers per episode (millions)

Season	Episode number															Average
Season	1	2	3	4	5	6	7	8	9	10	11	12	13	14	15	Average
1	14.12	11.94	10.81	9.79	9.97	8.68	9.18	9.25	9.82	9.18	8.34	8.44	8.86	8.99	8.99	9.76
2	8.38	7.53	7.22	6.81	6.95	6.27	6.49	6.71	7.19	5.82	4.88	4.86	4.53	4.80	5.29	6.25
3	5.11	4.33	4.40	4.00	4.29	4.07	4.08	4.32	4.95	5.41	4.69	4.92	4.66	4.92	4.92	4.61
4	3.96	3.88	3.88	3.56	3.56	3.56	3.71	3.72	3.80	3.54	3.68	3.26	4.14	3.36	3.83	3.70
5	2.93	3.02	3.22	2.74	2.93	2.86	3.02	3.13	2.84	2.74	2.58	2.74	2.57	2.56	2.76	2.84
6	2.43	2.56	2.23	2.10	2.25	2.16	2.21	2.28	2.16	2.91	2.78	2.81	2.77	2.69	3.20	2.50

Audience measurement performed by Nielsen Media Research
