= Bonnie Winterbottom =

Fictional character in How to Get Away with Murder

- How to Get Away with Murder character
- Liza Weil as Bonnie Winterbottom; taken for a promotional shoot before the second season.
- First appearance: "Pilot" (1.01); September 25, 2014
- Last appearance: "Stay" (6.15); May 14, 2020
- Created by: Peter Nowalk
- Portrayed by: Liza Weil

In-universe information
- Title(s): Bonnie Winterbottom, Esq.
- Occupation: Associate attorney (seasons 1-3); Assistant district attorney, City & County of Philadelphia (season 4-6)
- Significant other: Asher Millstone (ex-boyfriend) Ronald Miller (ex-boyfriend) Frank Delfino
- Nationality: American

Bonnie Winterbottom is a fictional character created by Peter Nowalk. Portrayed by Liza Weil, she is a Philadelphia-based associate attorney who works for Annalise Keating's firm, and is one of the main characters on the ABC legal drama series How to Get Away with Murder, introduced in the 2014 premiere.

== Casting ==
On February 27, 2014, it was announced that Shonda Rhimes had cast Liza Weil in the role of Bonnie Winterbottom.

Due to Weil's previous portrayal of Amanda Tanner in season one of Scandal, Bonnie Winterbottom was unseen in the March 1, 2018, crossover event involving the Scandal episode "Allow Me to Reintroduce Myself" and "Lahey v. Commonwealth of Pennsylvania", the episode of How to Get Away with Murder, to avert any confusion or continuity issues between the two characters Weil played within the timelines of both series.

== Development ==
=== Characterization and introduction ===
"I’ve always played people who are considerably younger, so it’s nice to be playing a grown-up. Bonnie is a grown-up. She’s a serious lady, man. Bonnie is very much navigating and delegating to the students. The students are the only people Bonnie and Frank can assert their power over and I think they’re enjoying that. Bonnie presents as more warm, but she does have an edge. I can relate to her."

— Actress Liza Weil on Bonnie's personality.

Early in the series, Bonnie was portrayed as a stoic, blunt, and responsible adult, though she also held an unrequited crush for Annalise's husband, Sam Keating. However, over the course of the series, her personal life collapses, and Bonnie finds herself facing numerous problems. She was pressed by Annalise, who wanted her to work more and more, and was involved in a fateful relationship with Annalise's intern Asher Millstone. Bonnie's portrayer, Liza Weil, said the character is a grown-up woman and Weil's first role as a "serious lady." Bonnie had a terrifying past; her father, a custodian at Philadelphia City Hall, sexually abused her when she was a girl.

In an interview with Variety, series creator, Peter Nowalk, commented that on Season 3, "Bonnie is going to have to choose sides, basically. Bonnie is like, Annalise, we can forgive Frank, it was Sam's fault! She's trying to be the peacemaker," he said, regarding the season 2 finale.

=== Relationships ===
Bonnie was romantically linked with Asher Millstone, one of Annalise Keating's interns. They had sex for the first time the night Sam was killed, then again after Bonnie won her first case in court. They broke up when Bonnie suspected Asher of seeing another woman, not knowing he was behaving strangely because he was being blackmailed by Emily Sinclair. Their relationship ended permanently when Bonnie discovered Asher's role in a gang-rape coverup and learned Annalise had revealed Bonnie's past trauma to him.

Bonnie's relationship with Frank Delfino is special and complex; they help each other with their problems and are always available to each other, although the extent of their history remains unclear. When Bonnie discovered that Frank killed Lila, she lied to Annalise and covered up the whole story. They talked about running away together and then had sex a few days after Frank killed Bonnie's abusive father (who was imprisoned in a state facility in Coalport in central Pennsylvania), but Frank abandoned Bonnie the next morning, creating a rift between them. Bonnie later convinced Frank not to kill himself by telling him that night meant everything to her, and expressing her love for him, but she later asked him to take the blame for all the crimes, causing him to ask if she was lying when she said she loved him. Though no longer in a relationship, she lost her life in a failed attempt to save his, when both are shot dead (she accidentally) in the series finale.

Bonnie has a love-hate relationship with Annalise Keating. In the season 2 premiere, it is revealed that Bonnie killed Rebecca Sutter in order to protect Annalise. Later, when Bonnie discovered that Annalise had revealed Bonnie's past to Asher, Bonnie said she wanted Annalise dead. However, when Annalise was shot, Bonnie helped her in many ways. Since then, Bonnie has remained Annalise's right-hand woman and closest associate.

Bonnie told Annalise she loved her after they fought about Bonnie's relationship with Frank, although it's not clear whether she meant platonic or romantic love. They kissed when Annalise was drunk on the day of the fire. Bonnie represented Annalise when Annalise was charged with murder and arson, even though Bonnie offered to get another attorney to take the case.
