= Alrick Riley =

British TV director and writer (born 1964)

- Born: 1964 (age 61–62); London, England
- Other name: Alrich Riley
- Occupations: Television director, writer, former child actor
- Years active: 1975–present

Alrick Riley (born 1964) is a BAFTA TV award-winning English television director and writer, and former child actor.

He is known for his work on the British series Spooks (known as MI-5 in some countries) and Hustle; along with his more recent work on the American fairytale drama Once Upon a Time.

== Life and career ==
Riley was born in London, England. As a shy young child, his Jamaican parents "made" him go to an acting club to force him "out of himself". He began his acting career at eleven years old as a featured extra on the BBC TV comedy Some Mothers Do 'Ave 'Em, followed by appearances in series, such as: Johnny Jarvis and Me and My Girl, and the 1979 film Scum.

After leaving high school, Riley knew he no longer wanted to act, but "definitely wanted to stay in the business". He and a friend bought an 8 mm camera, and Riley discovered a passion for direction. His mother was initially against his pursuit of directing: she favoured the theatre arts and was concerned he would not be a success pioneering to be a black television director. He attended West Midlands University, before attending the National Film & Television School. Two short films he directed while at the school, Money Talk and Concrete Garden, went on to be screened at multiple international film festivals. Riley credits Martin Scorsese and Francis Ford Coppola as notable inspirations, but accredits his love of film to Charles Burnett.

Riley has directed episodes of Playing the Field, Stanton Blues, The Inspector Lynley Mysteries, Hotel Babylon, Silent Witness, Boy Meets Girl, Ashes to Ashes, Bedlam, Spooks, Hustle, Hunted, Death in Paradise, Perception, Castle, NCIS, Legends, NCIS: New Orleans, The Walking Dead, Person of Interest, Tyrant and Once Upon a Time.

Riley was one of the writers on the British sitcom Desmond's.

Along with Eric Coulter and Harry Bradbeer, in 1999 Riley won a BAFTA TV Award for their work on the UK series The Cops. His winning of the prestigious honour marked the first time in the history of the assembly that a black man was recognised.

== Select filmography ==
=== Direction ===
Year	Show	Season	Episode title	Episode	Credit
1998–2001	Stanton Blues	1	N/A	4	Director
1998–2001	Stanton Blues	1	N/A	5	Director
1998–2001	Stanton Blues	1	N/A	6	Director
1998–2001	Stanton Blues	2	N/A	4	Director
1998–2001	Stanton Blues	2	N/A	5	Director
1998–2001	Stanton Blues	2	N/A	9	Director
1998–2001	Stanton Blues	2	N/A	10	Director
1998–2001	Stanton Blues	3	N/A	3	Director
1998–2001	Stanton Blues	3	N/A	4	Director
2009	Boy Meets Girl	1	N/A	1	Director
2009	Boy Meets Girl	1	N/A	2	Director
2009	Boy Meets Girl	1	N/A	3	Director
2009	Boy Meets Girl	1	N/A	4	Director
2011	Bedlam	1	"Inmates"	3	Director
2011	Bedlam	1	"Committed"	5	Director
2011	Bedlam	1	"Burning Man"	6	Director
2004–2011	Spooks	3	N/A	9	Director
2004–2011	Spooks	3	N/A	10	Director
2004–2011	Spooks	4	N/A	3	Director
2004–2011	Spooks	4	N/A	4	Director
2004–2011	Spooks	6	N/A	9	Director
2004–2011	Spooks	6	N/A	10	Director
2004–2011	Spooks	8	N/A	1	Director
2004–2011	Spooks	8	N/A	2	Director
2004–2011	Spooks	8	N/A	5	Director
2004–2011	Spooks	8	N/A	8	Director
2004–2011	Spooks	10	N/A	1	Director
2004–2011	Spooks	10	N/A	2	Director
2005–2012	Hustle	2	"The Lesson"	3	Director
2005–2012	Hustle	2	"Missions"	4	Director
2005–2012	Hustle	4	"Big Daddy Calling"	6	Director
2005–2012	Hustle	8	"Gold Finger"	1	Director
2005–2012	Hustle	8	"Ding Dong That's My Song"	5	Director
2005–2012	Hustle	8	"The Con is Off"	6	Director
2014	Perception	3	"Bolero"	7	Director
2014	Perception	3	"Prologue"	8	Director
2014	Intelligence	1	"The Rescue"	5	Director
2014	Intelligence	1	"Size Matters"	7	Director
2014	Graceland	2	"The Ends"	8	Director
2014	Castle	7	"Montreal"	2	Director
2014	Castle	7	"Once Upon a Time in the West"	7	Director
2014–2016	Once Upon a Time	4	"Breaking Glass"	5	Director
2014–2016	Once Upon a Time	5	"The Broken Kingdom"	4	Director
2014–2016	Once Upon a Time	5	"Devil's Due"	14	Director
2014–2016	Once Upon a Time	6	"Strange Case"	4	Director
2015	CSI: Crime Scene Investigation	15	"Under My Skin"	17	Director
2015	Revenge	4	"Retaliation"	16	Director
2015	Legends	2	"The Legends of Curtis Ballard"	3	Director
2015	Legends	2	"The Legend of Ilyana Zakayeva"	4	Director
2015–2020	NCIS	12	"Check"	11	Director
2015–2020	NCIS	13	"Loose Cannons"	16	Director
2015–2020	NCIS	14	"Home of the Brave"	7	Director
2015–2020	NCIS	14	"Pandora's Box, Part 1"	14	Director
2015–2020	NCIS	15	"Double Down"	15	Director
2015–2020	NCIS	15	"Handle with Care"	16	Director
2015–2020	NCIS	16	"A Thousand Words"	7	Director
2015–2020	NCIS	16	"Mona Lisa"	18	Director
2015–2020	NCIS	17	"Schooled"	18	Director
2015–2016	NCIS: New Orleans	1	"You'll Do"	21	Director
2015–2016	NCIS: New Orleans	2	"Means to an End"	19	Director
2015–2016	Person of Interest	4	"Terra Incognita"	20	Director
2015–2016	Person of Interest	5	"A More Perfect Union"	6	Director
2016	Wayward Pines	2	"Sound the Alarm"		Director
2016	Dead of Summer	1	"Home Sweet Home"	9	Director
2016	Tyrant	3	"Ask for the Earth"	8	Director
2016–2017	The Walking Dead	6	"Twice as Far"	14	Director
2016–2017	The Walking Dead	7	"The Cell"	3	Director
2016–2017	The Walking Dead	7	"Bury Me Here"	13	Director
2017–2018	Lucifer	2	"A Good Day to Die"	13	Director
2017–2018	Lucifer	2	"Let Pinhead Sing!"	17	Director
2018	Bull	2	"A Redemption"	19	Director
2018	The Crossing	1	"Some Dreamers of the Golden Dream"	7	Director
2019	How to Get Away with Murder	5	"Be the Martyr"	11	Director
2019	How to Get Away with Murder	6	"I Want to Be Free"	8	Director
2019	The Good Doctor	2	"Believe"	16	Director
2019	The Good Doctor	3	"SFAD"	7	Director
2019–2022	S.W.A.T.	2	"Day of Dread"	21	Director
2019–2022	S.W.A.T.	3	"Funny Money"	48	Director
2019–2022	S.W.A.T.	5	"Family"	102	Director
2019	Blood & Treasure	1	"The Curse of Cleopatra, Parts I & II"	1-2	Director
2019	Blood & Treasure	1	"Code of the Hawaladar"	3	Director
2020	Unsaid Stories	1	"Generational"	10	Director
2020	Bridgerton	1	"Oceans Apart"	7	Director
2020	Bridgerton	1	"After The Rain"	8	Director
2021	Stephen	1	"Episode 1"	1	Director
2021	Stephen	1	"Episode 2"	2	Director
2021	Stephen	1	"Episode 3"	3	Director
