= Paul Adelstein =

American actor (born 1969)

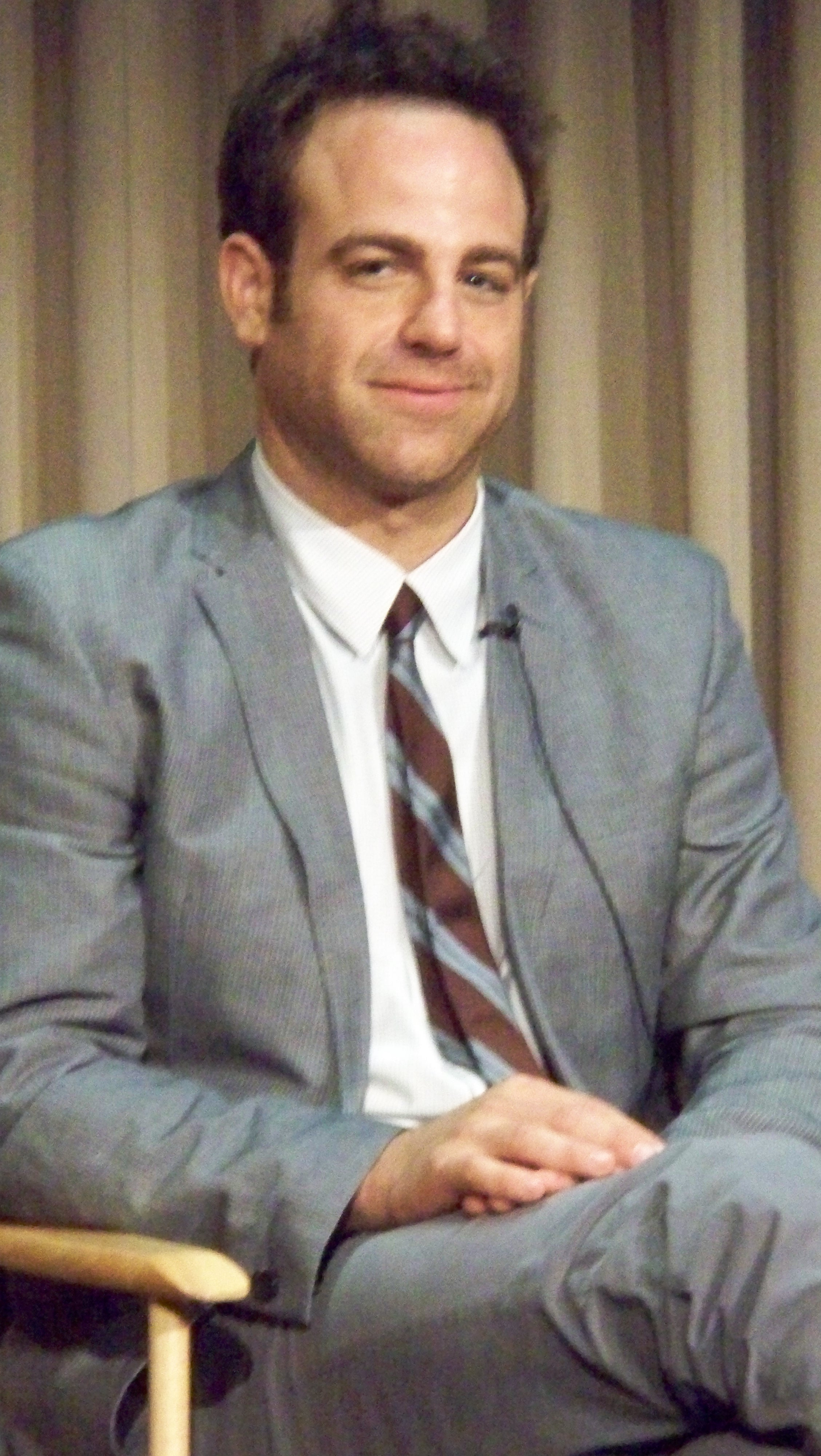
- Adelstein in 2008
- Born: April 29, 1969 (age 57); Chicago, Illinois, U.S.
- Education: Bowdoin College
- Occupation: Actor
- Years active: 1990–present
- Spouse: Liza Weil (m. 2006; div. 2017)
- Children: 1

Paul Adelstein (born April 29, 1969) is an American actor. He is known for the role of Agent Paul Kellerman in the Fox television series Prison Break and his role as pediatrician Cooper Freedman in the ABC medical drama Private Practice. In addition to supporting roles in films such as Intolerable Cruelty and Memoirs of a Geisha, he is also known for his recurring role as Leo Bergen on ABC's Scandal and as Jake Novak in the Bravo television series Girlfriends' Guide to Divorce. He also played David Sweetzer on the short-lived NBC comedy I Feel Bad.

Adelstein co-created the dark comedy TV series Imposters, which aired on Bravo and ran for two 10-episode seasons from 2017 and 2018; he is credited as a writer on 6 episodes. He also played the role of Shelly Cohen on that show.

== Early life ==
Adelstein was born in Chicago, Illinois, to a Reform Jewish family. Prior to his professional acting career, Adelstein attended the progressive Francis W. Parker School, then Bowdoin College where he graduated Phi Beta Kappa and summa cum laude with a degree in English. He began his career in theatre, working with New Crime Productions, a company founded by John Cusack, and later with the Steppenwolf Theatre Company.

== Career ==
After making his film debut in the film The Grifters (1990), Adelstein went on to appear in several television series, including Cupid, ER, Without a Trace, and Scrubs, and to play a number of significant supporting roles in films such as Bedazzled (2000), Intolerable Cruelty (2003), Memoirs of a Geisha (2005), Be Cool (2005), The Menu (2022) and Crime 101 (2026).

In 2005, he received his most significant role to date as a member of the regular cast of the suspenseful television series Prison Break. Although he played the role of mysterious government operative Paul Kellerman, he had originally auditioned for the role of protagonist Lincoln Burrows. When he left the show in 2007, he joined the regular cast of the medical drama Private Practice and stayed for the show's entire six-season run. After the series finale in 2013, he had more recently a recurring role as Leo Bergen on Scandal, which continued into 2018.

He played the main role of Jake Novak, the husband of Abby McCarthy (Lisa Edelstein) in Girlfriends' Guide to Divorce, which premiered in late 2014 as the first scripted original series for Bravo. In April 2016, he was cast as Raymond Blackstone in the Hulu series Chance, starring Hugh Laurie.

== Music career ==
Adelstein is the lead singer and guitarist of a band called Doris. The band was started in the late 1990s, and Adelstein has recorded several albums with them, singing and songwriting for the group. Adelstein is also a pianist and guitarist. His musical background was the cover story in the May/June 2012 issue of Making Music Magazine.

== Personal life ==
Adelstein moved to Los Angeles in 2003, at the age of 34.

I've fallen in love with the city. I found it difficult at first, but like I said I was doing it in pretty small doses. By the time I had my own place I was pretty comfortable here, and now I love it. There's really no place in the world like Los Angeles, love it or hate it.

Despite hailing from Chicago, Adelstein has been a fan and supporter since childhood of the NFL's Cleveland Browns.

Adelstein married actress Liza Weil in a Reform Jewish ceremony, in November 2006. They had previously known each other through theatrical projects. The two went on to appear together in three film projects: the short film Order Up (2007), the Gregory Dark-helmed Frenemy (2008), and The Missing Person. She also appeared in an episode of Private Practice (airdate February 24, 2011), although she and Adelstein had no scenes together. Weil gave birth to their daughter in April 2010. Weil filed for divorce from Adelstein in March 2016, requesting joint custody of their daughter.

== Filmography ==
=== Film ===
Year	Title	Role	Notes
1990	The Grifters	Sailor - Young Paul	
1997	Peoria Babylon	Brad Kessler	
2000	Bedazzled	Bob/Roberto/Beach Jock/Sportscaster	
2003	Intolerable Cruelty	Wrigley	
2004	Lawrence Melm		
2004	Bandwagon	Joe Rice	
2004	Collateral	Fed #3	
2005	Memoirs of a Geisha	Lieutenant Hutchins	
2005	Be Cool	Hy Gordon	
2009	Land of the Lost	Astronaut (voice)	
2009	The Missing Person	Drexler Hewitt	
2009	Little Fish, Strange Pond	Philly	Direct-to-DVD, AKA Frenemy
2010	Happy Sushi		Short
2014	Return to Zero	Aaron Royal	
2016	The Phenom	Scott Borwitz	
2016	Mothers and Daughters	Peter	
2017	Confessions of a Teenage Jesus Jerk	Allen	
2022	The Greatest Beer Run Ever	Mr. Donohue	
2022	The Menu	Ted	
2024	We Strangers	Ed Laich	
2025	For Worse	Chase	
2026	Crime 101	Mark	

=== Television ===
Year	Title	Role	Notes
1998–1999	Cupid	Mike	10 episodes
1999	Turks	Officer Cliff Fowler	Television series
1999	ER	Hank Loman	Episode: "How the Finch Stole Christmas"
2002	R.U.S./H.	Tom Epstein	Television movie
2002	ER	Paul	Episode: "Bygones"
2002	Breaking News	Julian Kerbis	Television series
2002–2003	Hack	Sergeant Aldo Rossi	5 episodes (1x13, 1x14, 1x20, 2x04, 2x10)
2003	Law & Order: Special Victims Unit	Steven Kellerman	Episode: "Mercy"
2003	Partners and Crime		Television movie
2003	The Lyon's Den	Snyder	1 episode (1x09)
2003	Without a Trace	Dave	Episode: "Copy Cat"
2004	Las Vegas	Alex Brooks	Episode: "My Beautiful Launderette"
2005	Medium	Craig	Episode: "In the Rough"
2005	Harvey Birdman, Attorney at Law	Murro the Marauder (voice)	Episode: "Harvey's Civvy"
2005–2007; 2009; 2017	Prison Break	Paul Kellerman	Series regular, 48 episodes
2006	Nobody's Watching	Jeff Tucker	Television series
2006	Scrubs	Dr. Stone	Episode: "My Fallen Idol"
2007	Grey's Anatomy	Cooper Freedman	2 episodes (3x22, 3x23)
2007–2013	Private Practice	Cooper Freedman	Series regular, 111 episodes
2010	Glenn Martin, DDS	Earl (voice)	Episode: "Courtney's Pony"
2013–2017	Scandal	Leo Bergen	Recurring role, 18 episodes
2014–2018	Girlfriends' Guide to Divorce	Jake Novak	Series regular, 29 episodes; also writer and producer
2015	Law & Order: Special Victims Unit	Dr. Neil Alexander	Episode: "Decaying Morality"
2016	Chance	Raymond Blackstone	Recurring role, 9 episodes
2017–2018	Imposters	Shelly Cohen	4 episodes; also creator, writer, and executive producer
2017–2018	Brooklyn Nine-Nine	Seamus Murphy	Recurring role (season 5)
2017–2018	Get Shorty	Wes Krupke	4 episodes
2018	I Feel Bad	David Sweetzer	Main role
2019	The Marvelous Mrs. Maisel	Oscar Lehman	Episode: "It's the Sixties, Man!"
2019–2020	Chicago P.D.	Jason Crawford	Recurring role (season 7)
2021	True Story	Todd	Recurring role, 7 episodes
2023	Cruel Summer	Steve Chambers	Main role (season 2)
2024	Monsters: The Lyle and Erik Menendez Story	David Conn	Episode: "Hang Men"
2024	Agatha All Along	Jeff Kaplan	2 episodes
2025	All's Fair	Matty Goodfader	Episode: "Everybody Dance Now"
2026	The Audacity	Dr. Gary Felder	
