= Denis Arndt =

American actor (1939–2025)

- Born: February 23, 1939; Issaquah, Washington, U.S.
- Died: March 25, 2025 (aged 86); Ashland, Oregon, U.S.
- Occupation: Actor
- Years active: 1974–2018
- Spouse: Marjorie Arveson (m. 1957; div. 1980) Magee Downey (m. 1980)
- Children: 7

Denis Leroy Arndt (February 23, 1939 – March 25, 2025) was an American actor, best known for his starring role as Alex Priest in the play Heisenberg for which he earned a 2017 Tony Award nomination for Best Actor in a Play.

== Life and career ==
Denis Arndt served in the Vietnam War as a United States Army helicopter pilot, earning a Purple Heart and Commendation Medal. After the war, Arndt flew helicopters in Alaska for several years before completing a degree at the University of Washington. He joined the Oregon Shakespeare Festival in Ashland, Oregon where he completed 15 seasons and was a charter member of Seattle's Intiman Theatre.

After Kenneth Welsh exited rehearsals of the play Heisenberg, Arndt was cast and joined the Manhattan Theater Club's production, which opened June 3, 2015. The production moved to Broadway's Samuel J. Friedman Theatre on October 13, 2016.

Arndt had also appeared in guest roles on a number of television shows including The Good Fight, Grey's Anatomy, Supernatural and Vanished. He had a regular role on Annie McGuire and recurring roles on Picket Fences and L.A. Law. He appeared in films including Basic Instinct and How to Make an American Quilt.

Arndt died on March 25, 2025, at the age of 86.

== Filmography ==
=== Film ===
| Year | Title | Role |
|---|---|---|
| 1974 | The Magical World of Disney | John Peterson |
| 1988 | Distant Thunder | Larry |
| 1992 | Basic Instinct | Lieutenant Phillip Walker |
| 1992 | We're Talking Serious Money | Jacubick |
| 1995 | How to Make an American Quilt | James |
| 1997 | Metro | Captain Frank Solis |
| 1997 | Payback | Neil Stanfill |
| 2000 | Blast | Sheriff |
| 2002 | Undisputed | Warden Lipscom |
| 2002 | Dead Heat | Dr. Ivan Barnes |
| 2003 | S.W.A.T. | Sergeant Howard |
| 2004 | Anacondas: The Hunt for the Blood Orchid | CEO |
| 2004 | Sniper 3 | CIA Director Bill Avery |
| 2006 | Behind Enemy Lines II: Axis of Evil | CIA Director Weylon Armitage |
| 2006 | Bandidas | Ashe |
| 2014 | Dolphin Tale 2 | Dennis / Disabled Vet |
| 2018 | Mr. Mercedes | Merrill D. Shields |

=== Television ===
| Year | Title | Role | Notes |
|---|---|---|---|
| 1974 | The Magical World of Disney | John Peterson | Episode: Runaway on the Rogue River |
| 1986 | Crime Story | Mr. Al Novak | 3 Episodes |
| 1988 | Wiseguy | Walker | Episode: Dirty Little Wars |
| 1988 | TV 101 | Officer Checker | Episode: Rolling |
| 1988-1989 | Annie McGuire | Nick McGuire | 10 Episodes |
| 1989 | The Wonder Years | Mr. Tyler | Episode: Walk Out |
| 1989 | Mancuso, F.B.I. | Ambassador Burton Kessler | Episode: Suspicious Minds |
| 1989 | Till We Meet Again | Swede Castelli | 2 Episodes |
| 1989-1990 | Life Goes On | Earl/Coach Delano | 2 Episodes |
| 1990 | Murder, She Wrote | Lt. Vincent Palermo | Episode: Murder, According to Maggie |
| 1990 | Columbo | Paul Mackey | Episode: Agenda For Murder |
| 1990-1991 | L.A. Law | Jack Sollers | 11 Episodes |
| 1991 | Stat | Dr. Deardorf | Episode: High Society |
| 1991 | Herman's Head | Russell Boswell | Episode: Fear and Loathing in Manhattan |
| 1992 | Cruel Doubt | Leith Von Stein | 2 Episodes |
| 1993 | Bodies of Evidence | Harris Devlin | 3 Episodes |
| 1993 | Lois & Clark: The New Adventures of Superman | Dr. Sam Lane | Episode: Requiem for a Superhero |
| 1993-1996 | Picket Fences | Franklin Dell | 14 Episodes |
| 1994 | SeaQuest 2032 | Navy Quartermaster Bickle | 2 Episodes |
| 1996 | The Beast | Osborne Manning | 2 Episodes |
| 1996 | The Burning Zone | Dr. Thurman Rhinehart | Episode: Pilot |
| 1997 | Savannah | Martin Corelli | 2 Episodes |
| 1997 | The Pretender | Nick Avani | Episode: Scott Free |
| 1999 | Turks | Glen Williams | Episode: Friends & Strangers |
| 1999 | Ally McBeal | Michael Mannix | Episode: The Green Monster |
| 1999 | Chicago Hope | Attorney Jason Sollers | Episode: Curing Cancer |
| 1999 | Time of Your Life | Archer Fitzwith | 3 Episodes |
| 1999 | Wasteland | Mr. Baskind | Episode: Thanks For Nothin' |
| 1999-2003 | The Practice | Roland Hill/Quentin Reynolds | 6 Episodes |
| 2000 | Touched By An Angel | Darrell | Episode: A Perfect Game |
| 2000 | Get Real | Stewart Green | Episode: History Lessons |
| 2000 | The District | Owen Mitchell | Episode: The Real Terrorist |
| 2001 | Family Law | Szabo | Episode: Film at Eleven |
| 2001 | Citizen Baines | Frank Starr | 2 Episodes |
| 2002 | CSI: Crime Scene Investigation | Larry Maddox | Episode: Chasing the Bus |
| 2002 | Providence | Dr. Bill Augustine | 9 Episodes |
| 2002 | For Your Love | Earl | Episode: The Missing Link |
| 2003 | Boston Public | A.D.A. Roland Hill | Episode: Chapter Sixty-Two |
| 2003 | JAG | Rear Admiral Richard La Porte | Episode: Shifting Sands |
| 2005 | 24 | Don Ashton | Episode: Day 4: 4:00 a.m.-5:00 a.m |
| 2006 | Boston Legal | A.D.A. Joshua Wendt | Episode: Can't We All Get A Lung |
| 2006 | Vanished | Senator Eugene Collins | 2 Episodes |
| 2007 | Supernatural | Father Reynolds | Episode: Houses of the Holy |
| 2010 | Past Life | Henry | Episode: Regressing Henry |
| 2011 | Grey's Anatomy | Colonel Daniel Robbins | Episode: White Wedding |
| 2017 | The Good Fight | Ron | Episode: The Schtup List |
| 2018 | How To Get Away With Murder | Justice Strickland | Episode: Lahey v. Commonwealth of Pennsylvania |
| 2018 | Mr. Mercedes | Merrill D. Shields | Episode: Fade to Blue |

=== Stage ===
| Year | Title | Role | Notes |
|---|---|---|---|
| 1976 | King Lear | King Lear | Oregon Shakespeare Festival |
| 1978 | Ballymurphy | Seamus O'Neil | ACT Theatre |
| 1978 | Makassar Reef | Weeks Brown | ACT Theatre |
| 1984 | The Ballad of Soapy Smith | Soapy Smith | The Public Theater, Off-Broadway |
| 1987 | Richard II | Earl of Northumberland | Delacorte Theater, Off-Broadway |
| 2007 | The Pillowman | Tupolski | The Studio Theatre |
| 2009 | The Seafarer | Lockhart | Artists Repertory Theatre |
| 2010 | God of Carnage | Alan Raleigh | Seattle Repertory Theatre |
| 2012 | Red | Mark Rothko | Seattle Repertory Theatre |
| 2014 | The Tempest | Prospero | Oregon Shakespeare Festival |
| 2014 | The Great Society | Appel Daley Wheeler | Oregon Shakespeare Festival |
| 2015 | The Night Alive | Maurice | Geffen Playhouse |
| 2016 | Heisenberg | Alex Priest | Samuel J. Friedman Theatre, Broadway |
| 2017 | Fireflies | Abel Brown | Long Wharf Theatre |
