= Heisenberg (play) =

2015 play by Simon Stephens

- Written by: Simon Stephens
- Original language: English
- Subject: Love story about a chance encounter between a 42-year-old mother and a 75-year-old butcher, and the chain of events it sets in motion.
- Genre: Drama

Premiere
- Date premiered: June 3, 2015
- Place premiered: New York City Center (Stage II)

Heisenberg is a play by English playwright Simon Stephens. It opened off-Broadway on June 3, 2015, in a Manhattan Theatre Club production at New York City Center (Stage II), under the direction of Mark Brokaw. The production transferred to Broadway's Samuel J. Friedman Theatre opening on October 13, 2016. Both productions starred Mary-Louise Parker and Denis Arndt.

The play opened at Wyndham's Theatre in London's West End on October 3, 2017. The production starred Anne-Marie Duff and Kenneth Cranham.

Heisenberg should not be confused with the play Copenhagen by Michael Frayn, about the physicist Werner Heisenberg.

== Synopsis ==
Georgie Burns, a 42-year-old woman, and Alex Priest, a 75-year-old butcher, meet in a London railway station. They begin a relationship and eventually travel to New Jersey to search for Georgie's missing son.

== Awards and nominations ==
- 2017 Tony Award for Best Actor in a Play nominee for Denis Arndt
