= The Missing Person =

- Directed by: Noah Buschel
- Written by: Noah Buschel
- Starring: Michael Shannon; Amy Ryan; Frank Wood; Linda Emond; Margaret Colin; John Ventimiglia; Merritt Wever; Paul Adelstein; Liza Weil; Daniel Franzese
- Distributed by: Strand Releasing
- Release dates: January 16, 2009 (Sundance); November 20, 2009 (United States)
- Running time: 101 minutes
- Country: United States
- Language: English
- Box office: $48,895

The Missing Person is a 2009 American neo-noir mystery film written and directed by American independent filmmaker Noah Buschel and starring Michael Shannon and Amy Ryan. It premiered at the 2009 Sundance Film Festival. and was distributed by Strand Releasing to a limited number of theaters on November 20, 2009.

== Plot summary ==
John Rosow (Michael Shannon) is an alcoholic private investigator. Suddenly Rosow is given the case of his life when he is hired to tail a man named Harold Fullmer (Frank Wood) on a train. Rosow soon discovers that Fullmer is one of the thousands presumed deceased after 9/11, and that Fullmer has fashioned a new life for himself. As the film progresses, Rosow faces the moral decision to take Fullmer, unwilling, back to his wife in New York, or letting him remain in his fabricated life.

== Cast ==
- Michael Shannon as John Rosow
- Frank Wood as Harold Fullmer
- Amy Ryan as Miss Charley
- Linda Emond as Megan Fullmer
- Paul Sparks as Gus
- Yul Vazquez as Don Edgar
- Margaret Colin as Lana Cobb
- Paul Adelstein as Drexler Hewitt
- Kate Arrington as Jane Rosow

== Reception and release ==
The film holds a 67% positive rating on the film-critics aggregator Rotten Tomatoes. Buschel was nominated for the 2009 Gotham Award for Best Breakthrough Director for his work on the film. According to Box Office Mojo, the film had grossed $48,895 as of March 2, 2010. It appeared on IFC.com's list of the ten best films of 2009, the San Francisco Bay Guardian's list of the Top Three Films of 2009, and Variety critic Dennis Harvey's list of the Top 25 films of the year.
