= Little Fish, Strange Pond =

- Directed by: Gregory Dark
- Written by: Robert Dean Klein
- Produced by: Sharlotte Blake; Gregory Dark; Margo Kravis
- Starring: Matthew Modine; Callum Blue; Paul Adelstein; Adam Baldwin; Zach Galifianakis; Don McManus; Liza Weil; Lisa Brenner; David Ellison
- Cinematography: Gavin Kelly
- Edited by: Bob Mori; David Moritz
- Production companies: Crazy Dogs Films; GDSM Productions
- Distributed by: Grindstone
- Release dates: October 23, 2009 (Hollywood Film Festival); December 14, 2010 (DVD)
- Running time: 80 minutes
- Country: United States
- Language: English
- Budget: $485,000

Little Fish, Strange Pond (alternate titled as Frenemy) is a 2009 American direct-to-DVD independent black comedy drama film directed by Gregory Dark and written by Robert Dean Klein.

== Plot ==
The film follows two men who wander about Los Angeles, engaging in a series of philosophical debates that gradually transition into them committing violent behaviors. Meanwhile, a police officer trails the men.

== Cast ==
- Matthew Modine as Mr. Jack
- Callum Blue as Sweet Stephen
- Paul Adelstein as Philly
- Adam Baldwin as Tommy
- Zach Galifianakis as Bucky
- Don McManus as Dennis Rivers
- Liza Weil as Norma
- Lisa Brenner as Juliet
- David Ellison as Romeo

== Release ==
The film was initially released under the title Little Fish, Strange Pond and it premiered at the Hollywood Film Festival on October 23, 2009. The film was later retitled Frenemy for its DVD release on December 14, 2010. That release was known for prominently featuring Zack Galifianakis on the cover with a poor overall photo manipulation after his success with The Hangover, though he wasn't even highlighted as a star of the film below Modine and Blue when it was released originally, and only played a small role within it.

== Reception ==
The Austin American-Statesman reviewed the film, noting that the film tried to be too many things at once but was instead "sour incoherence". DVD Talk also reviewed it, writing "As a weird comedy/morality play involving gruesome murder, Frenemy will test your limits of appreciation for clever structure and kegger philosophy, as forcefully as it pushes your buttons with unlikable characters."
