= Lahey v. Commonwealth of Pennsylvania =

- How to Get Away with Murder episode
- Episode no.: Season 4 Episode 13
- Directed by: Zetna Fuentes
- Written by: Morenike Balogun; Sarah L. Thompson
- Cinematography by: Michael A. Price
- Editing by: Chris Lorusso
- Original air date: March 1, 2018
- Running time: 43 minutes

Guest appearances
- Kerry Washington as Olivia Pope; Cornelius Smith, Jr. as Marcus Walker; Tom Irwin as Justice Mark Spivey; Sharon Lawrence as Ingrid Egan; Denis Arndt as Justice Strickland; Kathryn Erbe as Jacqueline Roa; Roger Robinson as Mac Harkness; Mackenzie Astin as Noah Baker; Behzad Dabu as Simon Drake; Glynn Turman as Nate Lahey Sr.; Cicely Tyson as Ophelia Harkness; Jesse D. Goins as Chief Justice Patrick Montgomery; Cathy Ladman as Justice Helen Bass; Ruben Pla as Justice Alberto Gutierrez

Episode chronology
← Previous "Ask Him About Stella"	Next → "The Day Before He Died"
- How to Get Away with Murder (season 4)

"Lahey v. Commonwealth of Pennsylvania" is the thirteenth episode of the fourth season of the American legal drama television series How to Get Away with Murder. The fifty-eighth episode overall, it was written by Morenike Balogun and Sarah L. Thompson and directed by Zetna Fuentes. A crossover with political drama series Scandal, the installment aired on March 1, 2018, on ABC, following "Allow Me to Reintroduce Myself", the twelfth episode of the seventh season of Scandal.

In the crossover, Annalise Keating (Viola Davis) team up with Olivia Pope (Kerry Washington) to work up a class action regarding the mass incarceration of black people in the United States, whilst Annalise faces her own trauma. Scandal actor Cornelius Smith, Jr. guest stars in the episode alongside Washington.

The episode received highly positive reviews, with high praise directed towards the characters of Annalise and Olivia, the portrayal of racism and mental health, and the acting of Davis, Washington, and Cicely Tyson, who played Annalise's mother.

== Plot ==
Annalise gets Olivia Pope to help her with the class action and, after both of them get the case on the docket to be heard by the Supreme Court, they prepare Annalise to try the case. Michaela and Marcus Walker investigate someone giving info to one of the Supreme Court justices. During the stake out, Michaela cheats on Asher with Marcus and her friends notice the next day, except Asher. Right before they start, Annalise gets a call from Jacqueline Roa, who tells her Isaac has been hospitalized after an overdose and she ruined him just like everything in her life. Annalise starts panicking and she asks Olivia to take her place. Olivia tells her she has to do it and helps her get up again. Annalise goes to the Supreme Court and their response is postponed. Frank and Bonnie keep investigating Sandrine's involvement with Wes' death and Frank finally reveals to Laurel that her mother is keeping something from her, showing her the recordings Wes made with her mother the day before he died. Annalise and Olivia say their goodbyes, then Bonnie calls Annalise to tell her Simon is awake.

== Production ==
On January 3, 2018, Scandal star Kerry Washington tweeted a photo to Viola Davis of herself in a "familiar" setting, that being a courthouse used for the set of How to Get Away with Murder. Fans began to speculate a possible crossover episode being in the works, which was only heightened when Davis tweeted out a photo in response, that being her on the set of the fictitious Oval Office from Scandal. Later that day, the crossover was officially confirmed through a tweet by Scandal creator and Murder executive producer Shonda Rhimes.

How to Get Away with Murder creator Peter Nowalk later went on to share in an interview with Deadline:

At the beginning of the season, my writers and I were planning out Viola's entire arc and something in her story organically came up that was very appropriate for Scandal. When I went to Shonda, she heard it. I said, we don't have to do it, Viola's arc doesn't need this, but it's possible that their stories could cross really organically. She actually pulled up a clip of something from Scandal and their side of the story coalesced perfectly. So it was one of those serendipitous things where we both realized it was good for both characters, and it almost felt like we had been planning it since last season.

"Lahey v. Commonwealth of Pennsylvania" was written by Morenike Balogun and Sarah L. Thompson and directed by Zetna Fuentes. It features the songs "Surfin'" and "Swim in the Light" by Kid Cudi, and "Me and the Devil" by Gil Scott-Heron.

== Reception ==
=== Viewers ===
In its original American broadcast, "Lahey v. Commonwealth of Pennsylvania" was seen by an estimated 4.14 million household viewers and gained a 1.1/5 ratings share among adults aged 18–49, according to Nielsen Media Research. This means that 1.1 percent of all households with televisions watched the episode, while 5 percent of all households watching television at that time watched it. This was a 27% increase in viewership from the previous episode, which was watched by 3.26 million viewers with a 0.8/3 in the 18-49 demographics. The installment attached 3.00 million DVR viewers, summing up 7.16 million viewers.

=== Critical response ===
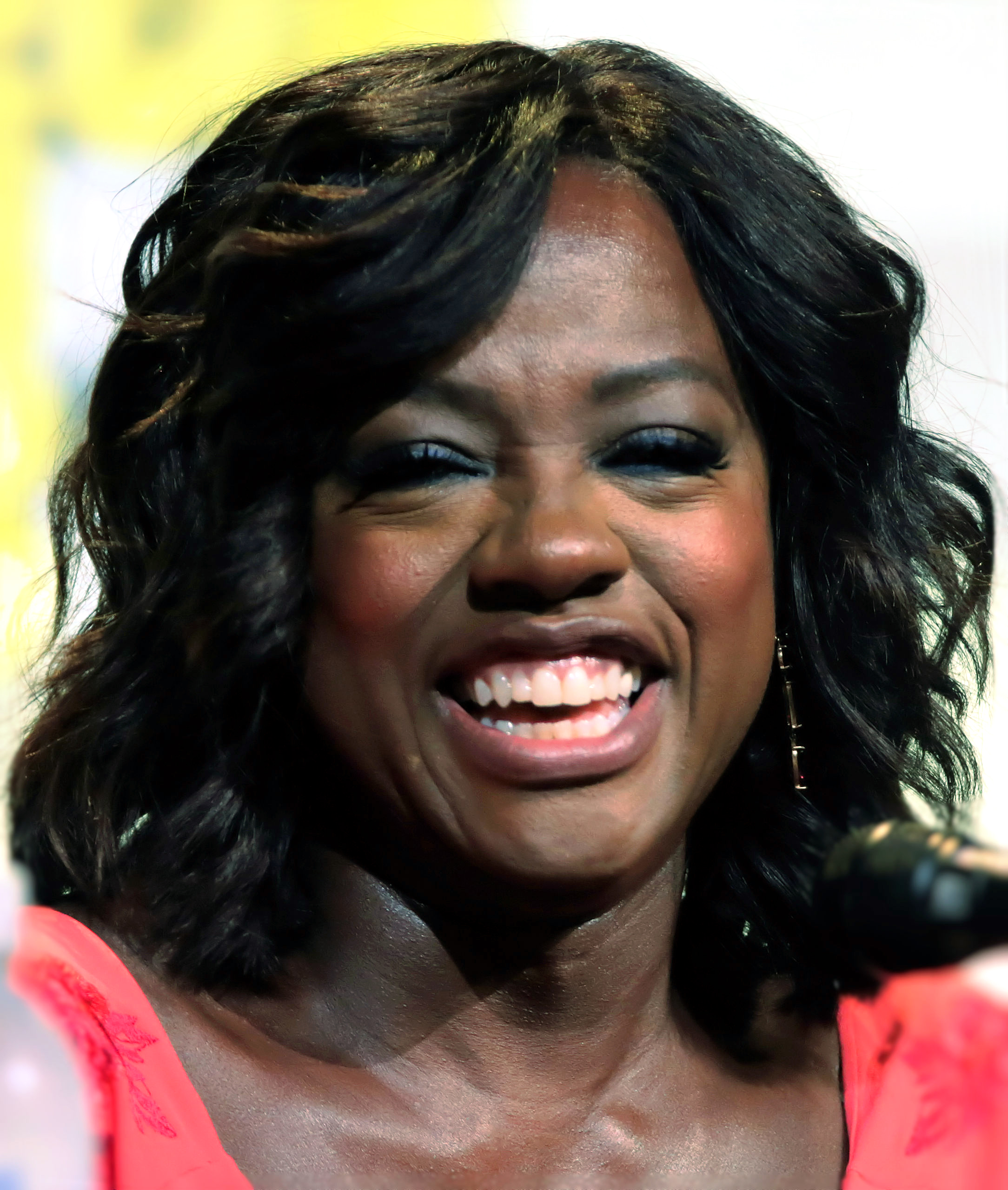
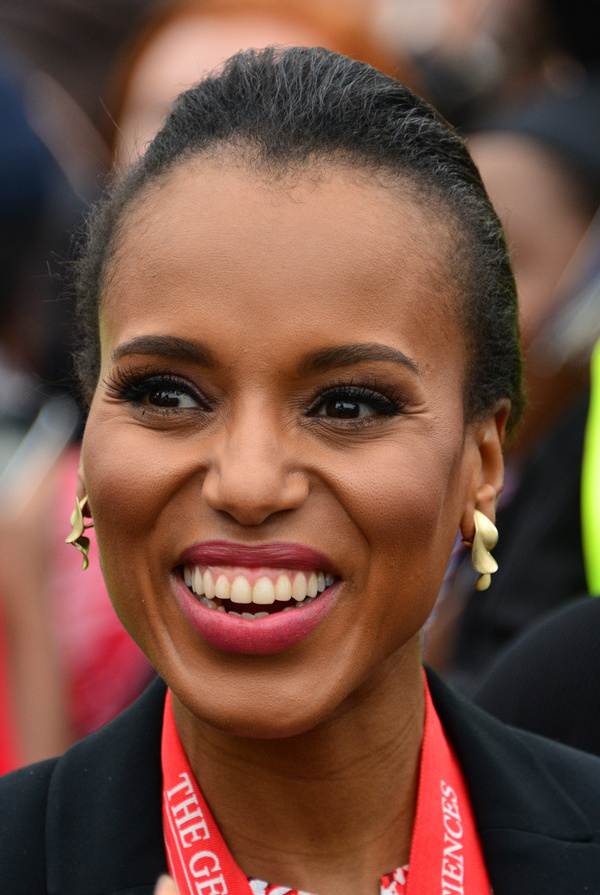
The characters and acting of Viola Davis (left) and Kerry Washington received high critical acclaim.

The episode received highly positive reviews, with high praise directed towards the dynamics between Annalise and Olivia, the approach to psychological trauma and institutional racism, and the acting of Davis, Washington and Tyson.

Kayla Kumari Upadhyaya of The A.V. Club wrote a positive review for the episode, calling the crossover a "success". The writer criticized the side storylines, which disrupted the main flow of the episode. In short, Kayla wrote, "Perhaps, most surprisingly, the episode never once feels like a gimmick or a tacky ploy for ratings that leans too confidently on the fact that people will watch just for the sake of the crossover. [...] The episode has some fun with it, but it’s also not here just to play. It gets serious about institutionalized racism in a way that feels specific and personal while still tackling a lot at once."

Reviewing the episode for Den of Geek, Kendall Williams rated it 4.5 out of 5 stars. He stated that he was personally involved with the installment as a black man, praising the depiction of racism and the irregularities of American law. Candice Horde of Tell-Tale TV gave the episode a 5/5 stars rating, commenting, "I couldn’t be any happier with this episode. What a masterful way to give the audience what we wanted with the crossover, continue to progress the plot, spearhead Annalise’s characterization, and speak the nation’s truth regarding the justice system’s discriminatory practices."
