= List of How to Get Away with Murder characters =

Or just burn the body

How to Get Away with Murder is an American drama television series that premiered on ABC on September 25, 2014. The series was created by Peter Nowalk, and produced by Shonda Rhimes and ABC Studios. Viola Davis stars as Annalise Keating, a law professor at a prestigious Philadelphia university who, with five of her students, becomes entwined in a murder plot. The series features an ensemble cast with Alfred Enoch, Jack Falahee, Aja Naomi King, Matt McGorry, and Karla Souza as Keating's students, Charlie Weber and Liza Weil as her employees and Billy Brown as a detective with the Philadelphia Police Department, and Annalise's lover. From the third season onward, Conrad Ricamora was added to the main cast after recurring heavily in the previous two seasons. Following is a list of characters who have appeared over the various seasons since the drama's premiere.

== Overview ==
Actor	Character	Appearances					
Actor	Character	1	2	3	4	5	6
Main characters
Viola Davis	Annalise Keating	Main	Main	Main	Main	Main	Main
Billy Brown	Nate Lahey	Main	Main	Main	Main	Main	Main
Jack Falahee	Connor Walsh	Main	Main	Main	Main	Main	Main
Aja Naomi King	Michaela Pratt	Main	Main	Main	Main	Main	Main
Matt McGorry	Asher Millstone	Main	Main	Main	Main	Main	Main
Charlie Weber	Frank Delfino	Main	Main	Main	Main	Main	Main
Liza Weil	Bonnie Winterbottom	Main	Main	Main	Main	Main	Main
Karla Souza	Laurel Castillo	Main	Main	Main	Main	Main	Recurring
Alfred Enoch	Wes Gibbins (Note: Enoch portrays Christopher Castillo in season 6.)	Main	Main	Main	Guest		Guest
Katie Findlay	Rebecca Sutter	Main	Guest				
Conrad Ricamora	Oliver Hampton	Recurring	Recurring	Main	Main	Main	Main
Amirah Vann	Tegan Price				Recurring	Main	Main
Rome Flynn	Gabriel Maddox				Guest	Main	Main
Timothy Hutton	Emmett Crawford					Main	
Recurring characters
Tom Verica	Sam Keating	Recurring	Recurring	Guest	Guest	Guest	Recurring
Megan West	Lila Stangard	Recurring					
Alysia Reiner	Wendy Parks	Recurring					
Lenny Platt	Griffin O'Reilly	Recurring					
Lynn Whitfield	Mary Walker	Recurring					
Arjun Gupta	Kan	Recurring					
April Parker Jones	Claire Bryce	Recurring					
Marcia Gay Harden	Hannah Keating	Recurring					Guest (Note: Voice only.)
Tamlyn Tomita	Carol Morrow	Recurring					
John Posey	William Millstone	Guest	Recurring				
Sarah Burns	Emily Sinclair	Guest	Recurring				
Esai Morales (Note: José Zúñiga portrays Jorge in season 1.)	Jorge Castillo	Guest		Guest	Recurring		Recurring
Cicely Tyson	Ophelia Harkness	Guest	Guest	Guest	Guest	Guest	Recurring
Benito Martinez	Todd Denver		Recurring	Recurring	Recurring		
Kendrick Sampson	Caleb Hapstall		Recurring				
Amy Okuda	Catherine Hapstall		Recurring				
Matt Cohen	Levi Wescott		Recurring				
Jefferson White	Philip Jessup		Recurring				
Famke Janssen	Eve Rothlo		Recurring	Guest		Guest	Guest
Adam Arkin	Wallace Mahoney		Recurring				
Kelsey Scott	Rose Edmond		Recurring	Guest			
Issac Ryan Brown	Christophe Edmond		Recurring	Guest			
Jennifer Parsons	Lydia Millstone		Guest				Recurring
Corbin Reid	Meggy Travers			Recurring			
Milauna Jackson	Renee Atwood			Recurring			
Matthew Risch	Thomas			Recurring			
Dameon Clarke	John Mumford			Recurring			
Gloria Garayua	Davis			Recurring			
Lauren Vélez	Soraya Hargrove			Recurring	Guest		
L. Scott Caldwell	Jasmine Bromelle			Recurring	Guest		
Behzad Dabu	Simon Drake			Recurring	Recurring		
Nicholas Gonzalez	Dominick Flores			Guest	Recurring		
Jimmy Smits	Isaac Roa				Recurring		
Lolita Davidovich	Sandrine Castillo				Recurring		
John Hensley	Ronald Miller				Recurring	Recurring	
Glynn Turman	Nate Lahey Sr.				Recurring	Recurring	
Melinda Page Hamilton	Claire Telesco				Guest	Recurring	
Tamberla Perry	Theresa Hoff					Recurring	
Jessica Marie Garcia	Rhonda Navarro					Recurring	Guest
Elizabeth Morton	Julie Winterbottom					Recurring	
Laura Innes	Governor Lynne Birkhead					Recurring	Recurring
Cynthia Stevenson	Pam Walsh					Recurring	Guest
Terrell Clayton	Jeffrey Sykes					Recurring	
William R. Moses	Special Agent Lanford					Recurring	Recurring
Gerardo Celasco	Xavier Castillo					Guest	Recurring
Marsha Stephanie Blake	Vivian Maddox						Recurring
Jennifer Jalene	Agent Avery Norris						Recurring
Ray Campbell	Solomon Vick						Recurring
Kelen Coleman	Chloe Millstone						Recurring
Mercedes Mason	Cora Duncan						Recurring
Cas Anvar	Robert Hsieh						Recurring
Quei Tann	Peyton Osborn						Recurring
Deborah Levin	Sara Gordon / Denise Pullock						Recurring
Lauren Bowles	AUSA Deanna Montes						Recurring
Kathleen York	Judge Martha Vitkay						Recurring
Guest characters
Steven Weber	Max St. Vincent	Guest					
Ana Ortiz	Paula Murphy	Guest					
Elliot Knight	Aiden Walker	Guest					
Elizabeth Perkins	Marren Trudeau	Guest					
Michelle Hurd	Amanda Winthrop	Guest					
Tom Everett Scott	Andrew Crawford	Guest					
Joan McMurtrey	Helena Hapstall		Guest				
Sherri Saum	Tanya Randolph		Guest				
Enuka Okuma	Nia Lahey		Guest				
Alexandra Billings	Jill Hartford		Guest				
Wilson Bethel	Charles Mahoney		Guest	Guest			
Roxanne Hart	Sylvia Mahoney		Guest	Guest			
Emily Swallow	Lisa Cameron		Guest	Guest			
Roger Robinson	Mac Harkness		Guest	Guest	Guest		
Gwendolyn Mulamba	Celestine Harkness		Guest		Guest		Guest
Amy Madigan	Irene Crawley			Guest			
Brett Butler	Trishelle Pratt			Guest			
Mark L. Taylor	Vince Levin			Guest			
Mary J. Blige	Ro			Guest			
Brian Tyree Henry	Frank's Police Defender			Guest			
Yolonda Ross	Claudia			Guest	Guest		
Julius Tennon	Desmond				Guest		
Stephanie Faracy	Ellen Freeman				Guest		
Marianne Jean-Baptiste	Virginia Cross				Guest		
Cristine Rose	Wenona Sansbury				Guest		
Kathryn Erbe	Jacqueline Roa				Guest		
Oded Fehr	Chase				Guest		
Kerry Washington	Olivia Pope				Special; Guest		
Cornelius Smith Jr.	Marcus Walker				Guest		
Tom Irwin	Spivey				Guest		
Sharon Lawrence	Ingrid Egan				Guest		
D.W. Moffett	Jeff Walsh				Guest	Guest	Guest
Jim Abele	Ted Walsh				Guest	Guest	
Mia Katigbak	Joanna Hampton					Guest	
Heidi Sulzman	Molly Keener					Guest	
Teya Patt	Paula Gladden					Guest	Guest
Dante Verica	Young Gabriel Maddox					Guest	Guest
Tess Harper	Sheila Miller					Guest	Guest
Emily Bergl	Sally						Guest
Kathleen Quinlan	Britt						Guest
Beverly Todd	Donna Fitzgerald						Guest
Sam Anderson	Thomas Fitzgerald						Guest
Natalia del Riego	Marisol Diaz						Guest
Oscar Daniel Reyez	Hector Diaz						Guest
Dijon Halton	Ravi						Guest
Anne-Marie Johnson	Kendra Strauss						Guest
Jamie McShane	U.S. Attorney Lennox						Guest
Marc Grapey	Floyd Bishop						Guest

== Main characters ==
=== Annalise Keating ===
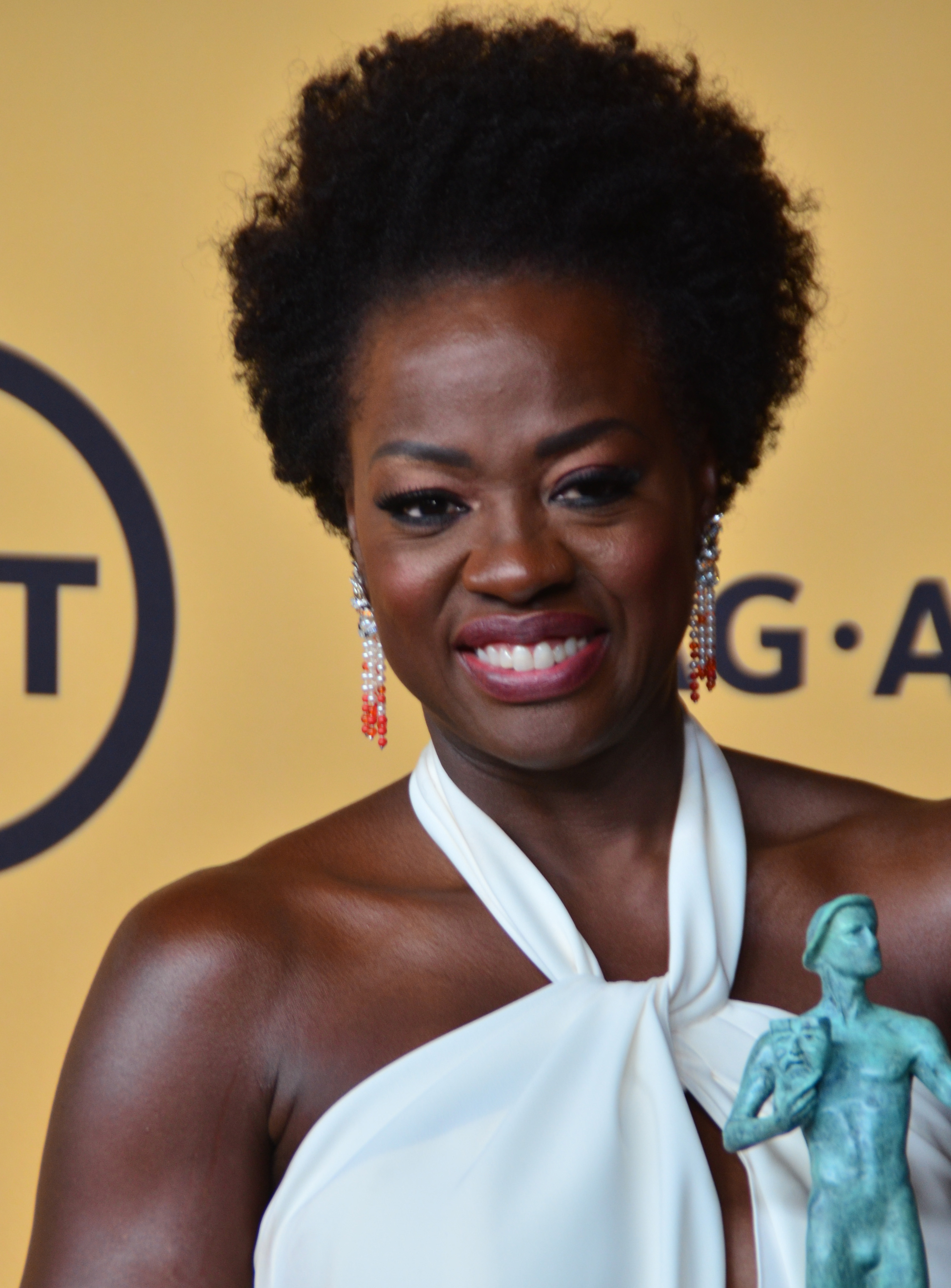
Viola Davis

Born Anna Mae Harkness, Annalise Keating (portrayed by Viola Davis) is a high-profile Philadelphia-based criminal defense attorney and law professor at the fictional Middleton University. Annalise is an emotionally troubled woman capable of anything to get what she wants and to protect those she loves. Annalise has been romantically involved with Nate Lahey — although she used him multiple times as a backup — and her college sweetheart Eve Rothlo. In the first season, Annalise selects a group of her best students to work at her firm. The body of a student who has been missing for months, Lila Stangard, is found in the water tank of her house by a repairman. Annalise eventually gets involved in the accidental murder of her husband Sam Keating, co-caused by four of her students. In the aftermath of Sam's death, the four students come together to burn Sam's body during a university party and throw his remains in the trash. Their plan is flawed, and the police end up finding the remains and an investigation is initiated.

The second season deals with Annalise's case of Caleb and Catherine Hapstall, and their alleged involvement in the death of their adoptive parents. In the mid-season finale, Emily Sinclair is murdered, and Annalise helps cover it up, at the expense of her being shot in the stomach by Wes. Wes Gibbins — who, during a while, was considered Annalise's favorite — starts an investigation around his mother's suicide ten years ago, and it is revealed from flashbacks how involved Annalise was with Wes' mother's suicide. The season ends with Annalise finding out that it was Frank that was responsible for her being in a car accident and losing her baby, and Annalise sends him away.

During the third season, Annalise restarts teaching Criminal Law in a pro bono clinic and her students being defense attorneys, each one proving their cases to be the representation. However, Annalise's position at the university is threatened, after an unknown person is targeting her with a series of flyers identifying her as a killer. Frank has also gone missing with Annalise and Nate trying to find him, while the murder of Wallace Mahoney is still under investigation. In the mid-season finale, Annalise is arrested after Wes' corpse has been retrieved from her burning house. However, Nate discovers that Wes was already dead before the fire started. The season later focuses on the investigation about Wes' death, and the identity of his murderer. While Annalise is having a hard time in jail, tensions rise within the remaining Keating 4, as they do not agree to consider if Annalise is really guilty or being framed. Soon, it appears the DA's office wants to keep Annalise in prison at any cost, so Bonnie and Frank team up to save her and eventually manage to get her free. She pins the murders on a deceased Wes thanks to a phone call he placed moments before his death. Days later, she writes recommendation letters to Connor, Michaela, Asher, Laurel, and Bonnie in order to let them go from her and the law clinic. She gets her license back after being caught with alcohol in her blood and also starts visiting a therapist, Isaac Roa.

During the sixth season, Annalise is investigated and tried for the various deaths that have happened around her, particularly Sam Keating's. In flash-forwards, Annalise is shown to have died under unknown circumstances with a funeral being held in her honor. Ultimately, Annalise is exonerated of all charges after an impassioned closing statement in which she confesses her faults and the crimes she did commit over her career and shows everyone who she truly is for the first time. It's shown that after her exoneration, Annalise lived a long life with Teagen before eventually dying of old age with many of her friends and former students attending her funeral. After Annalise's death, Christopher Castillo takes over her old law class at Middleton and renames it How to Get Away with Murder in Annalise's honor, seeing her amongst the students for a moment before she vanishes.

For her performance, Davis won the Primetime Emmy Award for Outstanding Lead Actress in a Drama Series in 2015. The role also won her two SAG Awards for Outstanding Performance by a Female Actor in a Drama Series, and one NAACP Image Award for Outstanding Actress in a Drama Series, as well as two Golden Globe nominations for Best Actress – Television Series Drama.

=== Nate Lahey ===
Nathaniel "Nate" Lahey Jr. (portrayed by Billy Brown) is a shrewd, fair and entitled detective with the Philadelphia Police Department who is having an affair with Annalise. Nate is married to Nia, who was diagnosed with cancer prior to the series' beginning.

In the first season, Nate serves as strength for Annalise when the latter is having a hard time. He investigates the night Sam Keating left town for a conference—the same night Lila died—and discovers he went to Yale University and returned to Philadelphia during exactly the same time Lila was killed. Nate omits that fact from Annalise, but eventually reveals to her when they have a fight. By the end of the first season, Nate is charged for Sam's murder.

In the second season, Annalise arranges lawyer and her ex-lover Eve Rothlo to take Nate's case. Nia dies, not before having an awkward conversation with Annalise. Nate is released from his charges; however, he is accused of giving Nia pills so she can die the way she wanted to. He is once again represented by Rothlo. He is eventually released and helps Annalise with the murder of Emily Sinclair.

In the third season, Nate and Annalise have another vicious fight and he ends up sleeping with A.D.A. Renee Atwood, the one who was mounting a case against Annalise. However, Nate, realizing that Atwood only hired him to gain intel on Annalise, ends their relationship. Events lead to Nate and Laurel arriving in Annalise's house minutes before a fire blazes the house down while someone is inside. They go to the hospital, where Nate identifies the one who was inside the house as Wes. Nate and Laurel get close since Nate always liked Wes. He helps her in gathering info about the house fire. Nate also discovers that his signature is on the papers instructing Wes' body be moved, a falsification made by Atwood in order to win the case against Annalise. It is revealed that Atwood not only moved Wes' body and tried to frame Nate and Annalise for it, but also had his body cremated, making it impossible for a second autopsy to clear Annalise.

In the fourth season, Nate starts working with Bonnie against Annalise, which also includes trying to ruin one of her cases. His father subsequently becomes the star of Annalise's class action lawsuit that goes all the way to the United States Supreme Court. Annalise wins the case and the right for a retrial for all of her clients, including Nate Sr.

In the fifth season, after his father is murdered in prison, Nate nearly beats Ronald Miller to death at Connor and Oliver's wedding, suspecting him of being responsible for the murder. Bonnie subsequently suffocates Miller to protect Nate, though it is later discovered that Miller really was innocent and just trying to help Nate Sr.

In the sixth season, Nate seeks justice for his father's murder, filing a civil suit and ultimately learning that Xavier Castillo ordered the murder. With Annalise on trial, Nate is offered a deal to testify against her in exchange for immunity for his own crimes. At odds with Annalise, Nate is offered the chance at revenge when Annalise and Frank capture Xavier who confirms that he had Nate Sr. murdered on the orders of Governor Birkstead. Nate murders Xavier in retaliation and attempts to use it to get Jorge Castillo to turn against the governor. Nate also solves Asher Millstone's murder, helping the FBI catch the true killer, one of the governor's aides disguised as an FBI agent. Nate is subsequently offered a twenty million dollar settlement from the Attorney General for Nate Sr.'s murder. To Annalise's surprise, Nate testifies on her behalf on the stand, though he commits perjury that Annalise did not frame him and instead reveals the FBI and AUSA's crimes, including covering up the murder of Asher Millstone. Nate and Annalise subsequently make peace and Nate uses his settlement to open a rehabilitation center in his father's honor. Nate's testimony and advice helps clear Annalise of all charges and he provides Annalise with Wes' recovered confession which she destroys.

=== Wes Gibbins ===
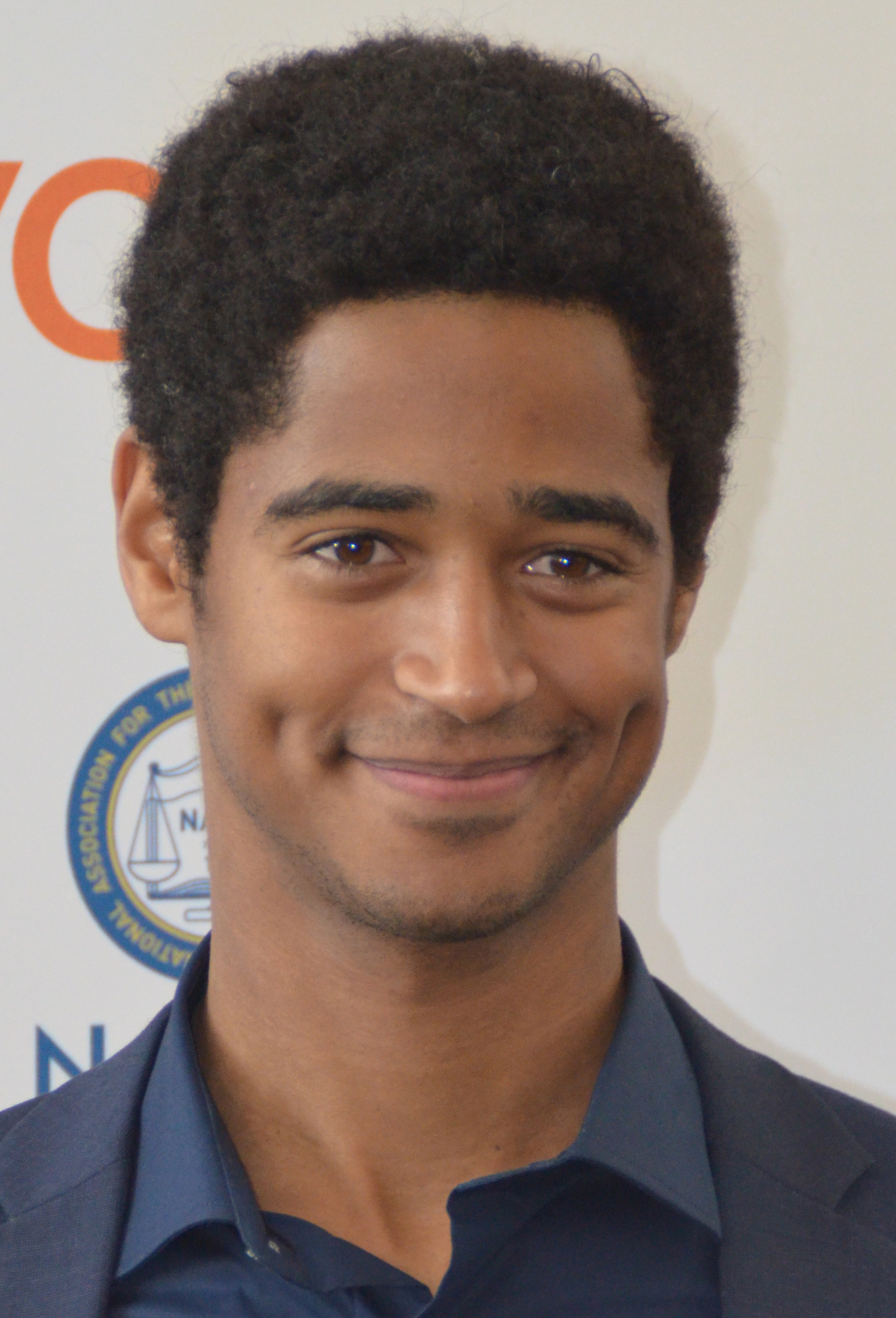
Alfred Enoch

Wesley "Wes" Gibbins (portrayed by Alfred Enoch) is a smart, sweet and eager-to-help student who was on the wait list for Middleton and is later selected to be part of Annalise's group. In the first episode, Wes finds out that Annalise is cheating on her husband and this makes him and the professor closer. Wes is dogged by his next-door neighbor Rebecca Sutter, who was Lila's friend before her death. One night, after Rebecca is arrested for Lila's murder, Wes finds in his bathroom Lila's cell phone which Rebecca had hidden there the night before.

In the first season, Wes helps in Rebecca's case in court along with Annalise. Rebecca is eventually released and over time, she and Wes become romantically involved. The two along with Wes' colleagues become embroiled in Sam's murder. Wes gets overprotective of Rebecca in the meantime. Rebecca is eventually killed by Bonnie in order to protect Annalise.

In the second season, Wes gets shocked after finding out that his deceased mother Rose was Annalise's client and that he was born Christophe Edmond. He also is embroiled in Emily Sinclair's murder. Over time, he develops a romantic relationship with Laurel.

In the third season, Wes is killed while Annalise's house burns down. It is revealed that Dominic, Laurel's former boyfriend and good friends with Laurel's father, is responsible for Wes' death following orders he received from Laurel's father.

In the sixth season, in a flashforward, Wes or someone similar in appearance is seen attending Annalise's funeral. During her trial, Annalise worries that the prosecution will bring in Wes as a surprise witness or find the confession he had written. However, in the series finale "Stay," Nate recovers Wes' confession which is destroyed by Annalise. The person attending Annalise's funeral is revealed to actually be Wes' son Christopher who grew up to be the spitting image of his father and takes over Annalise's old law class.

=== Connor Walsh ===
Connor Morgan Walsh (portrayed by Jack Falahee) is a clever, whimsical and manipulative student who is selected to be part of Annalise's group and uses his sexuality to reach his goals. He meets Oliver Hampton, a hacker, while trying to find information for a case; the two have sex and Connor gets the data he needed. Connor, who has slept with countless men, ends up clinging to Oliver, but Oliver rejects him after Connor himself kept Oliver away at the beginning. They eventually start a relationship.

In the first season, Connor gets involved in Sam's murder. He and Oliver take HIV test and find out that Oliver is HIV-positive.

In the second season, he is half-responsible for other murders.

In the third season, Connor tries to deviate from Annalise and the others after Annalise is arrested. However, he creates a plan to frame Annalise on all crimes and go unpunished. His friend does not allow it.

In the fourth season, Connor accepts Oliver's marriage proposal and applies for an internship. He is turned down by the law companies, just like Asher. As a consequence, Connor begins facing an identity crisis, triggering him to drop out of college.

In the fifth season, Connor marries Oliver. In the series finale, Connor seeks a divorce before going to prison, but Oliver refuses to sign the papers. Years later at Annalise's funeral, Connor and Oliver are shown to still be together.

=== Rebecca Sutter ===
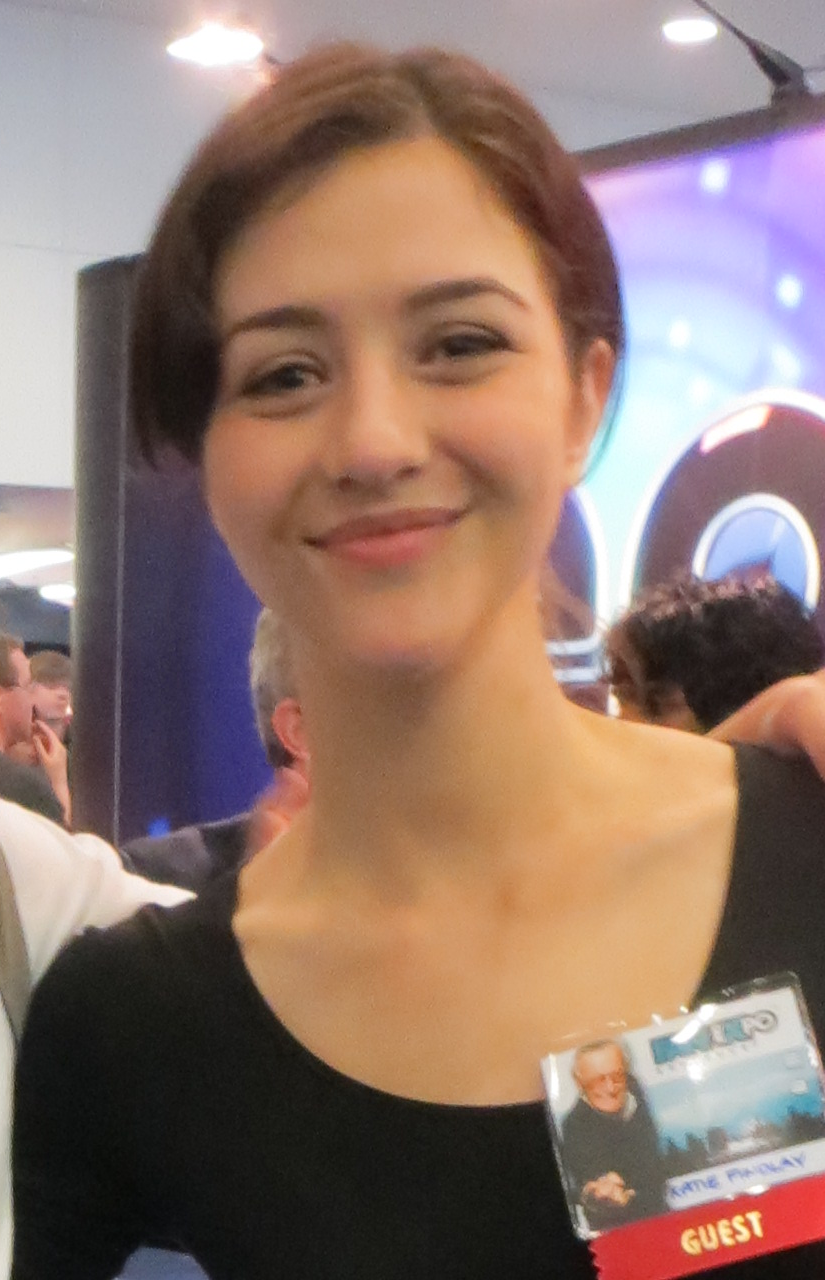
Katie Findlay

Rebecca Sutter (portrayed by Katie Findlay) is a drugs-inclined social outcast who was once the best friend of Lila, who is still dealing with her death. She befriends and eventually becomes romantically involved with boy-next-door Wes, who helps her when she is arrested for Lila's murder.

Rebecca is killed by Bonnie via suffocation in the first-season finale.

In the sixth season, Rebecca's murder is one of the crimes Annalise is tried for, though she is ultimately exonerated.

=== Michaela Pratt ===
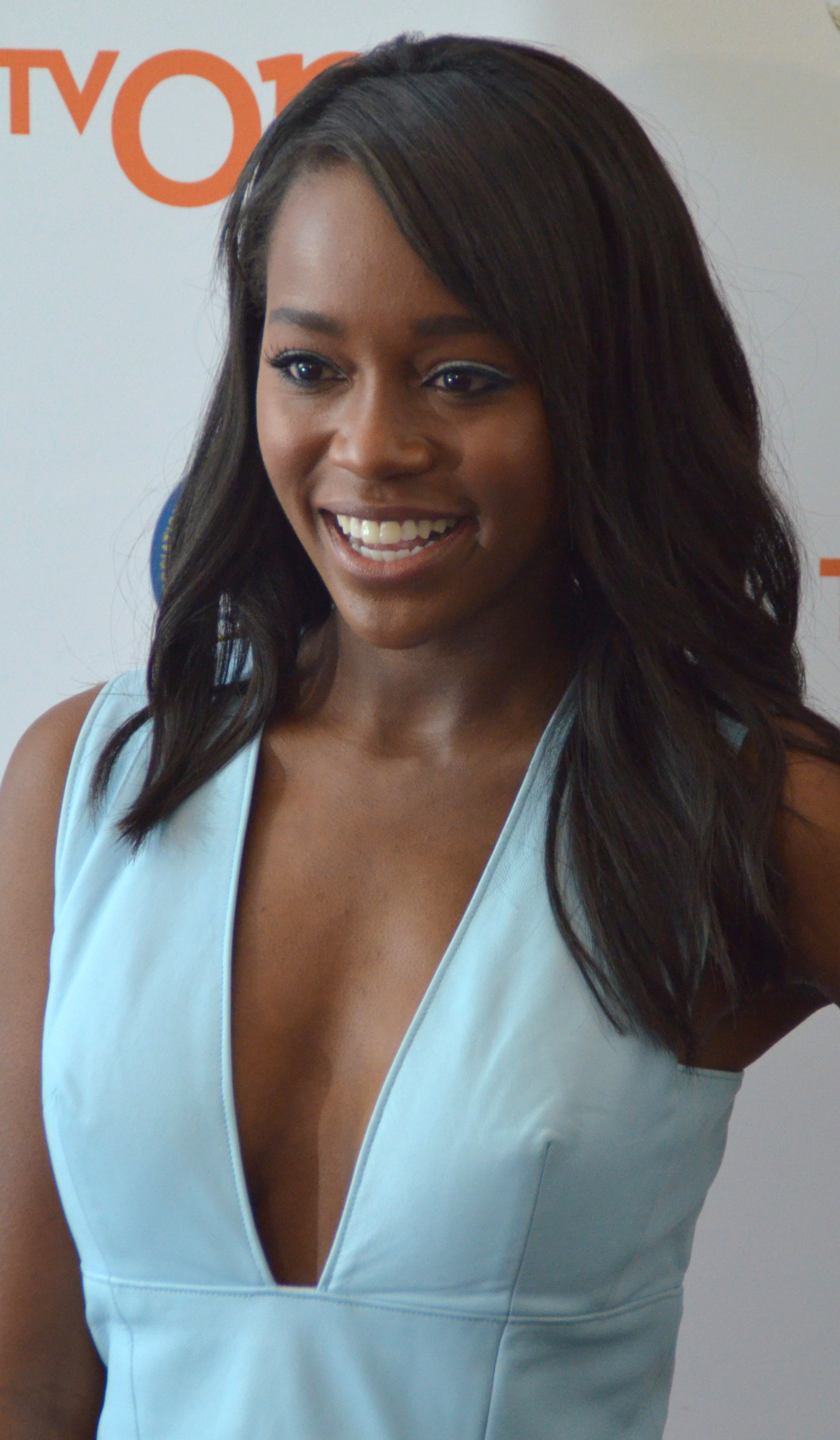
Aja Naomi King

Michaela Pratt (portrayed by Aja Naomi King) is a sophisticated, confident and silver-tongued student who aspires to be as successful a woman as Annalise is.

In the first season, she is engaged to Aiden Walker; however, she finds out that her fiancé had a relationship with Connor years earlier in boarding school. Michaela and Aiden have a long discussion about their engagement. Michaela finds that she has an interview at a law firm, only to discover that it is her future in-laws who have called the meeting for a prenuptial agreement. Michaela meets with her future mother-in-law to discuss the prenup she is refusing to sign. She is involved in Sam's murder.

In the second season, Michaela sleeps with a man named Levi Wescott, who is revealed to be "EGGS911," an unknown messenger who tried to contact Rebecca before her death (disappearance for Michaela and the others) and Rebecca's foster brother. She also becomes romantically involved with Caleb Hapstall, one of Annalise's clients. By the end of the season, Michaela and Asher share an unexpected moment together which leads, in the following season, to a serious relationship.

In the third season, Michaela's foster mother Trishelle lives with her in her apartment for a while, but she leaves after uninterrupted fights with Michaela.

In the fourth season, she continues her relationship with Asher, and after she is dispensed by Annalise she applies for internships. She accepts a job at Caplan & Gold and teams up with Laurel to investigate Laurel's father and Wes' death.

In the sixth season, Michaela is pressured into making a deal to testify against Annalise at her trial and is reunited with her biological father. As Annalise's trial progresses, Michaela shows an apparent lack of remorse for her actions and claims to be fine with the person she has become, causing Connor to label her a sociopath. With the help of her father, Michaela renegotiates an iron-clad deal that keeps her out of prison, while Connor is sent to jail for five years. As Connor is taken away, Michaela finds herself pushed away by Oliver and ghosted by Laurel, and is shown to be devastated and remorseful that her actions in her determination to avoid prison have cost her all of her friends. In a flash-forward, an older Michaela is shown being sworn in as a judge with two young women next to her, presumably her daughters. She is not present at Annalise's funeral unlike many of Annalise's other surviving friends and students, and the ultimate status of her relationship with her former law school friends is left unknown.

=== Asher Millstone ===
Asher Millstone (portrayed by Matt McGorry) is a privileged jokester who comes from a law-based background. Initially, Asher is rejected by his colleagues because of his childish and irresponsible behavior. He is even excluded from Sam's murder. Over time, Asher develops a casual relationship with Bonnie.

In the second season, Asher becomes embroiled in the murder of Emily Sinclair after her actions caused his father, William Millstone, to commit suicide. After his father's death, he is excluded from his family, leaving him with no money and becomes closer to his colleagues, becoming aware of their criminal past. He begins a sexual relationship with Michaela, which leads to a serious relationship.

In the third season, he tries to glue the group together after opinions begin to diverge and Annalise is distant.

In the fourth season, he applies for internships but is turned down. He eventually obtains one from D.A. Miller.

In the sixth season's "Are You the Mole?" Asher is revealed to be the FBI informant, though he claims not to have given them anything concrete. He is subsequently beaten to death with a fireplace poker by an unknown assailant. His killer is later revealed to be Denise Pollock, a woman working for the governor and posing as the lead FBI investigator on Asher's death. After Nate discovers the truth and reveals it to the FBI, she is arrested. Asher's murder is one of the crimes Annalise is tried for, but Nate reveals the truth of his murder on the stand and the fact that the FBI tried to cover up one of their own doing it by getting Nate a twenty million dollar settlement for his father's murder. Annalise is subsequently exonerated of murdering Asher as well as of the other crimes that she has been charged with.

=== Laurel Castillo ===
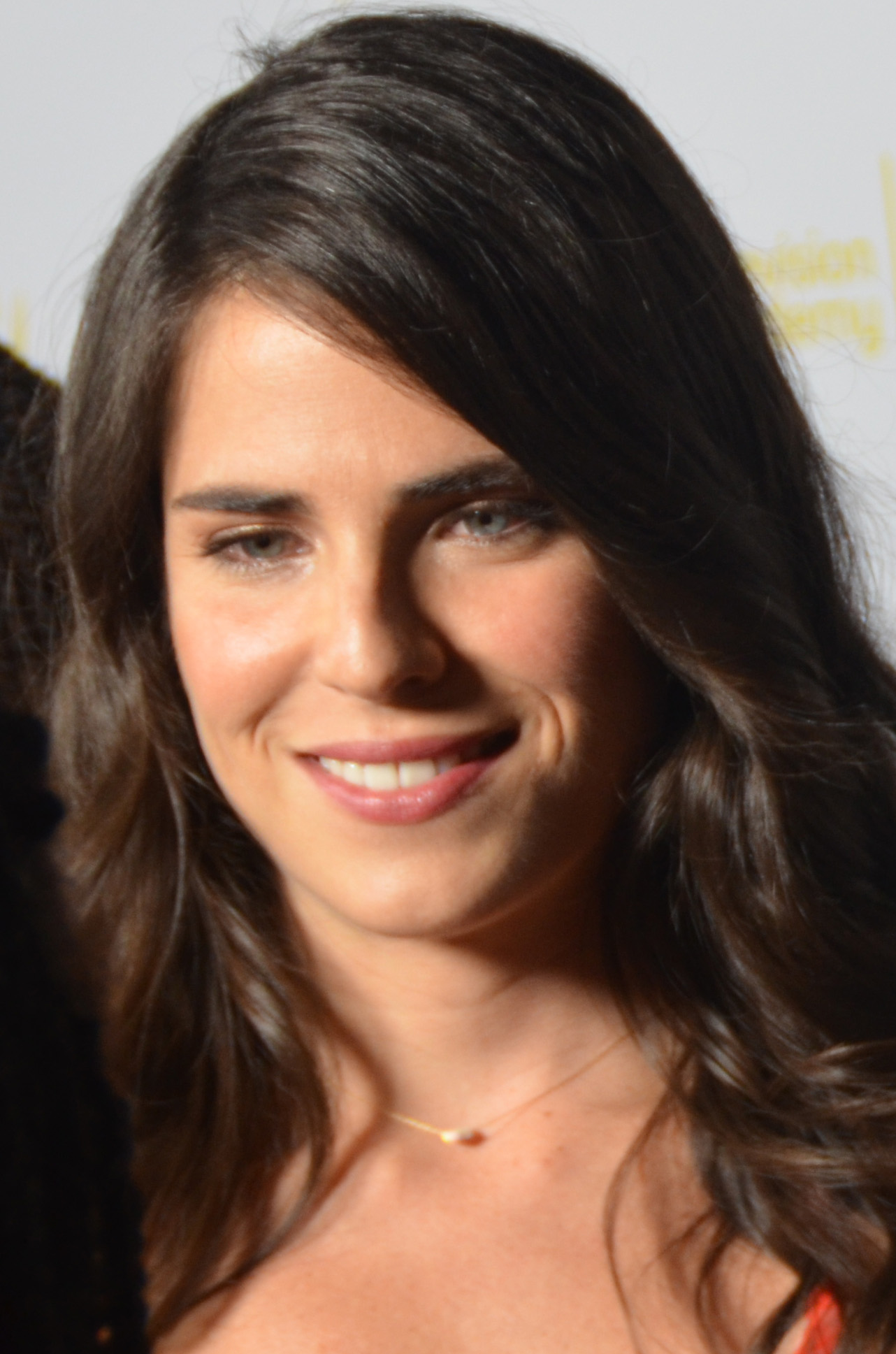
Karla Souza

Laurel Castillo (portrayed by Karla Souza) is a quiet, sensitive and ambitious idealistic who enrolled in law school to learn how to help the less fortunate. She manages to stay under the radar, making it easy for her classmates to underestimate her. With a profound attention to detail and inventive mind, she is talented and darker than expected.

In the first season, Laurel develops a sexual relationship with Frank Delfino as the two help each other with their struggles.

In the second season, Laurel and Wes investigate on Annalise's involvement with Wes' mother. They become romantically involved while Frank is away.

In the third season, Frank disappears and Laurel enters in the dilemma between Frank and Wes. Eventually, Wes is killed and she subsequently discovers that she is pregnant by him. Laurel, wanting to honor him, does everything to find out what happened to him and gets resentful after Annalise pins all the murders on a deceased Wes.

In the fourth season, Laurel begins to suspect her father, believing he is somehow guilty of Wes' death. She applies for internships and initiates an investigation on her father's company and himself. She does not show up for an interview for Caplan & Gold, where Michaela accepts a job, and the two women team up to investigate Laurel's father, whose company is represented by Caplan & Gold and who Laurel is sure to be responsible for Wes' death.

At the end of the fifth season, Laurel and Christopher vanish without a trace, leaving their fates unknown.

In season six's "Are You the Mole?", Laurel unexpectedly contacts her friends and reveals that she and Christopher are safe. Though the others think that Laurel made a deal with the FBI to be the mole in exchange for entering Witness Protection, Laurel insists that she is innocent on Christopher's life, having instead fled with the help of Tegan Price. The mole is subsequently revealed to be Asher who is later murdered.

In "Annalise Keating Is Dead," Laurel is called in as a surprise witness to testify against Annalise at her murder trial. Laurel explains that she was terrified about what her family would do to her and Christopher since Laurel might testify against them in the future and she enlisted the help of Tegan, an attorney who had negotiated Laurel's return when she was kidnapped as a teenager, to flee the state. Living in Brooklyn, Laurel was found by the FBI after Asher revealed her call which they were able to trace. In exchange for getting to keep Christopher and probation, Laurel agreed to testify that Annalise ordered the murder of Sam Keating and the coverup even though its perjury. During this time, Laurel is reunited with Frank and expresses remorse over her treatment of him. Frank gets Laurel to meet with Annalise who tries to convince Laurel to help her by reminding Laurel of everything that she has done for her, specifically saving Christopher. Though Laurel initially testifies on behalf of the prosecution, she suddenly admits to lying on behalf of the FBI and insists that Wes acted alone. As Laurel's friends confront her afterwards, she insists that she wants to be a good person instead of a lying manipulator. During the argument, the news breaks about the murder of Laurel's brother Xavier who had been killed by Nate in retaliation for his father's murder.

In "Stay," after her father Jorge lies on the stand for the governor, Laurel suggests having him killed and seeks out Tegan's help with something, promising her property worth millions in return; Jorge is subsequently killed in prison. During the shooting at the courthouse, Laurel flees in fear with Christopher and her phone is disconnected when Michaela subsequently tries to reach her. Years later, now gray-haired, Laurel attends Annalise's funeral with an adult Christopher and smiles at her old friends who are also in attendance. She apparently remained close to Annalise who is stated to have been a mentor to Christopher throughout his life. Laurel declines a chance to speak, but suggests that Christopher should.

=== Frank Delfino ===
Francis "Frank" Delfino (portrayed by Charlie Weber) is a reckless employee of Annalise's firm who is not a lawyer but handles special duties requiring discretion.

In the first season, Frank initiates a brash relationship with Laurel and continues to help Annalise with criminal and arcane tasks.

In the second season, he helps them with Sinclair's murder. In the third season, Frank disappears after Annalise discovers that, years earlier, Frank was responsible for the driver who hit her car and made her lose her baby. He slowly returns in order to protect Annalise, Bonnie and Laurel and even lies to the police saying he killed Wes.

In the sixth season, Frank is revealed to be the child of Sam and Hannah Keating through an incestuous relationship, something that he was never aware of but that Sam was. Though Frank is suspected of murdering Hannah, he insists that he did not.

In the series finale "Stay," devastated by the news of his parentage, Frank breaks up with Bonnie and gives Gabriel Maddox, his half-brother through Sam Keating, money to start a new life and confesses to being responsible for both the deaths of both Lila Stangard and their unborn half-brother. Frank is able to find a recording Hannah made that helps to clear Annalise's name and implicates the governor in the murder of Nate Lahey Sr. After Annalise's exoneration, Frank shoots and kills Governor Birkhead on the courthouse steps in retaliation for her crimes and in his own words, to make everything right. Frank is shot and killed by the courthouse security guards in return, dying in Bonnie's arms after telling her to tell Annalise that he had to make everything right. Having tried to stop him, Bonnie is accidentally hit also and dies moments later.

=== Bonnie Winterbottom ===
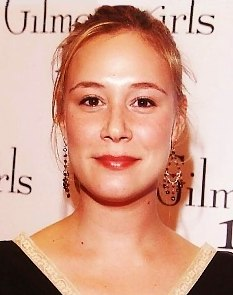
Liza Weil

Bonnie Winterbottom (portrayed by Liza Weil) is an odd associate attorney in Annalise's firm. Described as a "peacemaker" by series' creator Peter Nowalk, Bonnie is always trying to pull the right strings to make everything right and shipshape for Annalise. In her childhood, Bonnie was sexually abused multiple times by her father.

In the first season, she serves as Annalise's right-hand woman while assisting her in court. Over time, she develops a casual relationship with Asher. She kills Rebecca in order to protect Annalise.

In the second season, she embroils in Sinclair's murder and psychologically helps the involved. She covers up their tracks with the help of Nate, Annalise and Frank. She discovers that Frank was responsible for the death of Annalise's baby and eventually tells it to Annalise, culminating in Frank's disappearance.

In the third season, Bonnie secretly meets with Frank to talk and keep him updated. During one of these encounters, they have awkward sex. Along with Asher, she works to keep everyone united while Annalise is in jail. In Coalport, PA, Frank kills Bonnie's father at the prison in which he was serving time, avenging her mistreatment as a child. Later, Frank, trying to fix everything bad he caused to Annalise, is prepared to shoot himself in the head in front of her and Bonnie, leading to the duo's heated argumentation. Later, Bonnie convinces Frank to spare his own life for her sake, revealing their affair to Annalise and encouraging him to turn himself over to the DA's office to save them all from being arrested.

In the fourth season, Annalise gives Bonnie and the Keating Four recommendation letters and Bonnie uses it to become state prosecutor. She then begins working with Nate against Annalise. In Season 5 she begins dating the district attorney Ronald Miller.

In the series finale, Bonnie is accidentally shot and killed by courthouse security guards while trying to stop Frank from murdering Governor Birkhead. She dies in Annalise's arms moments after Frank's death.

=== Oliver Hampton ===
Oliver Hampton (portrayed by Conrad Ricamora) is a shy, delicate, soulful I.T. specialist and hacker, who gets infatuated by Connor. Connor first approaches him in the first season, needing info on a company to help with one of Annalise's cases. They have a sexual relationship until Oliver finds out that Connor is using him. However, Connor comes back to Oliver, telling him that he really likes him and that he had never felt this way towards anyone before. Connor moves into Oliver's apartment after Oliver gets diagnosed with HIV and they begin a relationship.

In the third season, Oliver proposes to Connor, but gets no answer.

In the fourth season, Oliver continues to ask Connor to marry, to which Connor eventually says yes. After being fired by Annalise, Oliver builds up his own I.T. company.

In the fifth season, Oliver marries Connor.

In the series finale (Season 6), Connor seeks a divorce before going to prison, but Oliver refuses to sign the papers. Years later at Annalise's funeral, Connor and Oliver are shown to still be together.

=== Gabriel Maddox ===
In "Nobody Else Is Dying", Frank learns that a man named Gabriel Maddox (portrayed by Rome Flynn) is enrolling at Middleton University and he quickly calls Eve Rothlo, warning that "her kid is here." After appearing in a guest capacity in the fourth-season finale, Flynn was promoted to series regular for the fifth season.

In the fifth season, he is introduced as an ambitious and self-confident student who manages to enter Annalise's legal clinic, subsequently working alongside her and the others at Caplan & Gold. While investigating his daily life, Frank discovers that he uses a disposable phone and maintains a suspicious attitude. Gabriel is revealed to be Sam's biological child from Vivian Maddox, and claimed to go to Middleton to learn more about his father. However, he is shown to be involved with District Attorney Miller and his investigation into Annalise.

During the sixth season, Gabriel briefly has a romantic relationship with Michaela Pratt that doesn't end well. During Annalise's murder trial, he learns of the Keating 5's role in his father's murder, albeit in a perjured version from Michaela on the stand, devastating Gabriel. In the series finale, Frank Delfino, who has just discovered that he is Gabriel's half-brother through Sam's incestuous relationship with Hannah Keating, offers Gabriel a great deal of money so that he can leave and start a new life. Frank insists to Gabriel that Annalise is innocent of Sam's murder and admits to being the one responsible for the deaths of both Rebecca Sutter and their unborn half-brother. After Annalise is exonerated, Gabriel is seen taking the money and leaving for a new life; he is not seen in the flash-forwards at Annalise's funeral nor is his further fate known.

=== Tegan Price ===
Tegan Price (portrayed by Amirah Vann) is a sophisticated, intelligent lawyer at Caplan & Gold who believes in Michaela's professionalism and future. She, Michaela, and Annalise team up to help Soraya Hargrove's negotiation with her ex-husband regarding their children's custody. After recurring in the fourth season, Vann was promoted to series regular for the fifth season.

In season six, Tegan acts as Annalise's defense attorney in her murder trial and shows romantic feelings towards her. Tegan is revealed to be the one who helped Laurel Castillo vanish at the end of season five after Laurel feared for her and Christopher's lives. Additionally, Laurel testifies at Annalise's trial that Tegan (then working for Caplan and Gold's Mexico City branch) helped negotiate Laurel's release from a kidnapping ten years prior, resulting in Tegan being removed as Annalise's attorney. Tegan refuses to speak to Laurel over this betrayal, but Laurel offers Tegan property worth millions of dollars in exchange for a favor, apparently helping to set up the prison murder of Laurel's father. In flash-forwards, its shown that Tegan and Annalise enjoy a long and happy life together following Annalise's exoneration. Tegan is implied to have died before Annalise ultimately dies.

=== Emmett Crawford ===
Emmett Crawford (portrayed by Timothy Hutton) is a managing partner at Caplan & Gold who hires Annalise to work for the firm. His job is to make sure the firm does not receive any further setbacks following the arrest of Jorge Castillo, but rumors of misconduct have spread about him during his time working in London.

Emmett dies at the end of the fifth season; his death is ruled a heart attack, but a number of people believe that he was murdered by the Castillo family at behest of Governor Lynne Birkhead, as retaliation for damaging the governor's career. He is succeeded as managing partner by Tegan Price, who was suspected (but ultimately cleared) of causing Emmett's death.

== Recurring characters ==
=== Introduced in season one ===
- Professor Sam Keating (Tom Verica): A professor of psychology and the husband of Annalise Keating for over 20 years until his death. Sam was involved in a sexual relationship with Lila Stangard, that eventually led to her death. He is the one who released Frank from jail and made Annalise hire him as her assistant. He also sent Frank to kill Lila after she threatened to expose their affair and her pregnancy to Sam's wife. During the first season, flashforwards scenes show that a fight led to Sam being killed and buried by Annalise's students. In season six, Sam is revealed to be the father of Frank through an incestuous relationship with his sister Hannah while Annalise is on trial for conspiracy to commit murder in his death. She is eventually exonerated.
- Lila Stangard (Megan West): A sorority girl, girlfriend of Griffin O'Reilly and a friend of Rebecca Sutter. She was having an affair with Sam Keating and was killed at his command. Lila was born to Stuart and Miranda Stangard. She wasn't raised for a religious life, so her family was shocked when she started dating O'Reilly and took a virginity pact with him. However, Lila lost her virginity to Sam and had sex with him multiple times. She ended up getting pregnant. When Sam found out about her pregnancy, he took her to an abortion clinic and wanted her to terminate it. Lila didn't want to, and their argument is captured on the surveillance camera that eventually helps convict Sam. After, she tries to sleep with Griffin so he would believe the baby was his, but he refused to. Sam went to Yale for a lecture, and Lila suspected that he wanted to get a job at Yale so he could move away and escape her, so she decided to visit his wife, Annalise, and tell her the truth. However, at that time, Sam was calling Annalise, so Bonnie Winterbottom answered the door and sent her away. In the night of her death, Sam skips his lecture at Yale and drives back to Philadelphia to see Lila. They meet on the rooftop of her sorority, and he tells her that he loves her and that he is going to leave Annalise for her. He slips away under the guise of going to tell Annalise immediately and calls Frank with a payphone. Frank later shows up at the rooftop and strangles her, dumping her body in the water tank.
- Griffin O'Reilly (Lenny Platt): Lila Stangard's former boyfriend and a primary suspect in Lila's murder case. He made Lila take a virginity pact with him. The night Lila died, he had a fight with her and eventually ended up in Rebecca's apartment, where he and Rebecca made out. Lila showed up and the three of them had a fight. Lila disappeared that night and, after her body was found in a water tank of her sorority building, both Griffin and Rebecca became suspects in Lila's death. It was later revealed that Griffin did not kill Lila, Frank did.
- Aiden Walker (Elliot Knight): Michaela's former fiancée. Michaela discovers that previous to knowing her, Aiden slept with Connor and begins to question his sexuality, eventually, along with other issues, resulting in their break-up.
- Kan (Arjun Gupta): Laurel's ex-boyfriend. They first met during a bar party and caused jealousy on Frank. As a way to flirt with Laurel, he gives her important notes to study for a test. He helped Laurel and the others to gather money for Rebecca's bail. After a while, Laurel forgets to break up with Kan or even talk to him and he notices. One night, she turns up outside of the Legal Aid building. Kan commends her on having a lot to talk to him after blowing him off for so long. She tries to explain that she was buried in work for school and that she does not want their relationship to end. The two get back together but their relationship does not last long as their relationship was a method for Laurel to get over Frank. The two have a fight over the constant excuses Laurel makes for blowing him off and they break up.
- Wendy Parks (Alysia Reiner): A district attorney who goes up against Annalise. Despite the feud between the women, Parks once gave Annalise the key to win a case in which Parks was against Annalise's client.
- William Millstone (John Posey): Asher's father who commits suicide after Asher discovers a corruption case with which he was involved.
- Hannah Keating (Marcia Gay Harden): Sam Keating's sister who hates Annalise and suspects that Annalise is somehow involved in Sam's murder. She grew up in the Keating house with Sam and their parents and hated when Annalise and Sam moved together to the house and Hannah was expelled off. In the sixth season she is revealed to be the true motivating factor behind Annalise's murder trial as she had an incestuous relationship with Sam. Through that relationship, she is the mother of Frank Delfino. Annalise later uses this to blackmail Hannah into helping her, but she is found dead of an apparent suicide though Annalise and Bonnie suspect she was murdered by either Governor Birkstead or Frank who had just found out the truth. Frank later insists that he was innocent and discovers a recording Hannah made that helps to clear Annalise's name.
- Jorge Castillo (José Zúñiga / Esai Morales): The millionaire owner of Antares Technologies and Laurel's ruthless father. He ordered Wes' murder. He meets Laurel at the university campus weeks after Wes' death and she tells him that she was pregnant and that she had an abortion. They take a photograph and he later sends the picture to her. She prepares to write "Why did you kill Wes?" to him, but deletes the text. After testifying against Annalise, he is killed in prison by two other inmates, apparently on the behest of Laurel herself.
- Ophelia Harkness (Cicely Tyson): Annalise's overprotective mother. During Annalise's childhood, she was raped by her uncle Clyde and Ophelia saw it happening. Angry, Ophelia burned down the house her family lived together with Clyde inside and, years later, still hallucinates about what she did. In the third season, she goes to visit Annalise in prison and confuses the fact that Annalise's house burned down with what happened years ago. That way, Annalise learns her mother has dementia. In the fourth season, Annalise goes to Memphis to visit her family and tries to hospitalize her mother in a nursing home. In the series finale, her advice and encouragement helps Annalise deliver a powerful closing statement that helps get Annalise found not guilty. In flash-forwards she is shown to have died at some point with Annalise attending her funeral.
- Emily Sinclair (Sarah Burns): An assistant district attorney who was run over by Asher after she provoked him by diabolically speaking of his father. Immediately after, he put her body inside his car trunk and drove to the Hapstall house, where he, Bonnie and the other associates manipulated a fake crime scene and threw Emily's body off the second floor to make it look like she committed suicide. In the sixth season, Emily's murder is one of the crimes that Annalise is on trial for but she is found not guilty in the end.

=== Introduced in season two ===
- Eve Rothlo (Famke Janssen): A death row attorney and Annalise's college sweetheart. During college, Eve and Annalise were lovers and Annalise left her when she decided to marry Sam Keating. She first appears after Annalise requests her help defending Nate for Sam's murder. The two share intimate moments and eventually sleep together again. Eve continues to show up to help Annalise in times of need throughout the series. In the series finale, Eve gives a eulogy at Annalise's funeral a number of years into the future.
- Caleb Hapstall (Kendrick Sampson): Annalise's client who is accused of murdering his adoptive parents. He eventually commits suicide after the truth comes out. In the sixth season, Annalise is charged with his murder but ultimately found not guilty.
- Catherine Hapstall (Amy Okuda): Caleb's foster sister who is likewise being accused of murdering her adoptive parents.
- Levi Wescott (Matt Cohen): Rebecca's foster brother AKA Eggs 911. He was investigating Rebecca's disappearance and approached and slept with Michaela to gather info.
- Nia Lahey (Enuka Okuma): Nate's wife who died of cancer and was aware of Nate's affair with Annalise. Nate was accused of her murder and Sinclair prosecuted him in hopes of taking Annalise down.
- Philip Jessup (Jefferson White): A half-sibling to Caleb and Catherine Hapstall. He is the result of an incestuous affair between brothers Grant and Helena Hapstall. He was put up for adoption and later came back to get revenge for being rejected.
- A.D.A. Todd Denver (Benito Martinez): A prosecutor in charge of multiple cases. In the third season, he initiates a chase to Annalise, linking her to deaths of Sam, Sinclair and the Hapstall siblings. Annalise eventually gets rid of the accusations with a recording of Wes saying he killed Sam and the others. Later, Bonnie has a job interview with Denver and she eventually becomes a fellow prosecutor.
- Rose Edmond (Kelsey Scott): Wes' mother, who killed herself to protect her son.
- Wallace Mahoney (Adam Arkin): Sylvia's husband, Charles's father, and Wes' biological grandfather. He blamed Annalise for not defending his son, Charles, well enough, and ordered a crash that led to the death of the baby Annalise was carrying. It is implied Wallace consecutively raped Wes' mother, Rose, resulting in her pregnancy with Wes. He was shot in the head right as Wes randomly approaches him to reveal he thinks he's his son.
- Sylvia Mahoney (Roxanne Hart): Wallace's wife and Charles' mother.
- Charles Mahoney (Wilson Bethel): A spoiled man, he is the son of Wallace and Sylvia, and the biological father of Wes. He was accused of murdering his fiancée, being defended by Annalise. Later he is charged with the murder of his own father, Wallace Mahoney, though it's known to the audience Frank actually murdered Wallace.
- Mac Harkness (Roger Robinson): Annalise's father with whom she has very strained relationship, mostly because of his knowledge of the abuse suffered by Annalise during her childhood and ignoring it. In the third season, Annalise flies to Memphis to visit her family and, while there, has several arguments with Mac regarding her mother's health and the fact that he abandoned them years prior.
- Celestine Harkness (Gwendolyn Mulamba): Annalise's sister, who is a nurse and has a lovely connection to her sister. In the second season, Celestine and Ophelia host a house party celebrating Annalise's home return. In the fourth season, Celestine and Annalise get together to try to hospitalize their mother in a nursing home, knowing that she has dementia.

=== Introduced in season three ===
- Soraya Hargrove (Lauren Vélez): the dean of Middleton University. At first, Soraya questions the methods Annalise uses in her class and her dislike of Annalise is obvious. After Annalise offered to help her out with her case to gain full custody of her children, she gradually suspends her feelings of dislike towards Annalise. She betrays Annalise, becoming an informant for A.D.A. Atwood in exchange for custody of her children.
- Simon Drake (Behzad Dabu): A student in Annalise's class that dislikes the Keating 5 from the beginning, saying they're benefited and eventually spreads posters with Annalise's face and the word "Killer". In the fourth season, Simon is revealed to be gay and closeted, secretly having feelings for Oliver. He is accidentally shot in the head during an altercation, but survives. Michaela gets Simon deported back to his native Pakistan to prevent him from revealing anything to the authorities despite the fact that it could be a death sentence for Simon with his homosexuality. In the fifth season, he is stated to either be in an ICE detention facility or back in Pakistan. During the sixth season, Annalise exposes Michaela's actions towards Simon at her murder trial by playing Michaela's anonymous call to ICE to help discredit her testimony.
- Meggy Travers (Corbin Reid): Wes' former girlfriend. She teams up with Laurel to grieve over Wes' death.
- A.D.A. Renee Atwood (Milauna Jackson): A disliked assistant district attorney who was gathering proof against Annalise and was briefly involved with Nate.
- Thomas (Matthew Risch): A guy Oliver met online and started dating, eventually breaking up because of Thomas' harsh reaction to finding out of Oliver's HIV status. Connor sleeps with him as a revenge for Oliver dumping him.
- Detective John Mumford (Dameon Clarke): An investigator who was in charge of Wes' murder's investigation.
- Detective Davis (Gloria Garayua): An investigator and Mumford's right-hand.
- Trishelle Pratt (Brett Butler): Michaela's estranged adoptive mother with whom she had a strained relationship. She stays for a while in Michaela's apartment during the third season.
- Dominic (Nicholas Gonzalez): Laurel's former boyfriend and the one who, sent by Laurel's father, killed Wes during the Keating residence fire. Later killed by Frank.

=== Introduced in season four ===
- Isaac Roa (Jimmy Smits): Annalise's psychiatrist with whom she talks about her alcohol addiction. He was a heroin addict. During his sessions with Annalise, he tries hard to make her open up about what she is feeling and how she behaves.
- Ronald Miller (John Hensley): An assistant district attorney who works alongside Bonnie Winterbottom at the District Attorney's Office. After believing that Miller ordered his father's murder, Nate beats him nearly to death at Connor and Oliver's wedding before Bonnie tearfully suffocates him. Its later shown that Miller was in fact innocent and at the time of his death was planning on proposing to Bonnie, leaving her devastated when she learns the truth. In the sixth season, Annalise is charged with Miller's murder but is ultimately found not guilty.
- Jacqueline Roa (Kathryn Erbe): Isaac's ex-wife and therapist.
- Christopher Castillo (Alfred Enoch): Laurel Castillo and Wes Gibbins' son, born prematurely due to an altercation between Laurel and Frank Delfino. After nearly dying as a result, he is saved by Annalise who becomes Christopher's godmother. He is named after his deceased father whose real name is "Christophe". In flash-forwards its shown that Christopher grows up to be the spitting image of his father Wes and eventually takes over Annalise's old law class at Middleton after her death. He is stated to have been mentored by Annalise throughout his life before she died.
- Sandrine Castillo (Lolita Davidovich): Laurel's mother of French descent. She is divorced from Jorge and spent time in a mental institution. She also spoke to Wes for reasons that are unknown, shortly before his death. Her scalp is later sent to Laurel and she is presumed dead, apparently killed by either her husband or son.
- Nate Lahey Sr. (Glynn Turman): Nate's father who is in prison for murder. Annalise decides to make him the face of her class action suit. His subsequent murder on the orders of Governor Birkhead becomes a major focus in the fifth and sixth seasons. After getting a twenty million dollar settlement for his father's death, Nate opens a rehabilitation center in his honor with the money.
- Claire Telesco (Melinda Page Hamilton): An agent sent to investigate Todd Denver's death. She was later fired for failing to protect Sandrine, who was under witness protection.

=== Introduced in season five ===
- Lynne Birkhead (Laura Innes): The governor of Pennsylvania. She is an associate of the Castillo family and orders the murder of Nate Lahey Sr. In the final episode, Frank assassinates her in retaliation for Lahey's murder.
- Theresa Hoff (Tamberla Perry): A DNA analyst and Nate's new love interest, who he goes to for help when trying to track down Bonnie's child.
- Rhonda Navarro (Jessica Marie Garcia): A student at Middleton University who was chosen to be part of Annalise's Legal Clinic.
- Lanford (William R. Moses): An FBI special agent who leads an operation investigating the past crimes revolving Annalise and company. Throughout the sixth season he works to send Annalise to prison, making deals with her former students and pressuring them into perjuring themselves in the process. However, Laurel and Nate reveal his actions on the stand and Annalise is ultimately found not guilty. At Annalise's press conference after the trial, she suggests that Lanford will be charged with conspiracy for his actions.

=== Introduced in season six ===
- Vivian Maddox (Marsha Stephanie Blake): Gabriel's mother and Sam's ex-wife, who visits the former in Philadelphia to take him away from Annalise.
- Avery Norris (Jennifer Jalene): An FBI agent who replaces Claire and works alongside Lanford.
- Peyton Osborn (Quei Tann): One of the 24 students who integrate Caplan & Gold's legal clinic, who eventually becomes Gabriel's girlfriend.
- Chloe Millstone (Kelen Coleman): Asher's sister, who summons him to help her with their suicidal mother. Coleman was cast in the role in September 2019.
- Solomon Vick (Ray Campbell): Michaela's father, a wealthy lawyer who has a past with Annalise.
- Robert Hsieh (Cas Anvar): A lawyer who has multiple dates with Annalise.
- Sara Gordon (Deborah Levins): A woman secretly working for Xavier Castillo who poses as Special Agent Pollock, the lead investigator of Asher's murder. She is Asher's true killer as witnessed by Gabriel and is arrested by the FBI after Nate reveals her true affiliation to Agent Lanford. In the series finale, Lanford offers Nate a twenty million dollar settlement for his father's death in order to silence him about Gordon's murder of Asher. Nate subsequently turns around and reveals this on the stand at Annalise's trial, including that it was Gordon who murdered Asher which was one of the things Annalise was on trial for.
