= Liza Weil =

American actress (born 1977)

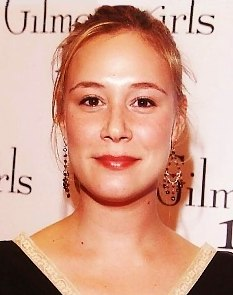
- Weil in 2005
- Born: June 5, 1977 (age 49); Passaic, New Jersey, U.S.
- Education: Columbia University
- Occupation: Actress
- Years active: 1993–present
- Spouse: Paul Adelstein (m. 2006; div. 2017)
- Children: 1
- Relatives: Scarlett Estevez (niece)

Liza Weil (born June 5, 1977) is an American actress. She starred as Paris Geller in the WB/CW comedy-drama series Gilmore Girls (2000–2007) and its Netflix revival series Gilmore Girls: A Year in the Life (2016). She has also played White House aide Amanda Tanner in the ABC political drama series Scandal (2012) and attorney Bonnie Winterbottom in the ABC legal drama series How to Get Away with Murder (2014–2020).

== Early life and education ==
Weil was born in Passaic, New Jersey, into an acting family. She was raised in, and continues to practice, Reform Judaism.

Her parents, Lisa and Marc Weil, toured Europe with their comedy troupe, The Madhouse Company of London, with her in tow. Weil had aspirations of becoming an archaeologist in her younger years, because of the Indiana Jones film trilogy and a childhood crush on Harrison Ford. In 1984, at the age of seven, her family settled down in suburban Lansdale, Pennsylvania northwest of Philadelphia, where her parents still reside. Weil has described herself as an average student who focused more on her budding acting career than her studies.

Weil traveled frequently to New York City for professional auditions and acted in productions both off-Broadway and in Philadelphia's theatrical community before pursuing her film and television career. A 1995 graduate of North Penn High School, she graduated in the summer rather than the regular term due to her acting commitments.

Her first appearance on network television was in a 1995 episode of the New York-based CBS soap opera As the World Turns, where she played an unnamed student in a science class.

== Career ==
Weil continues to be active in the Los Angeles theatrical community during hiatuses, is a regular performer at the Ojai Playwrights Conference in early August and radio dramas with L.A. Theatre Works, and still occasionally performs in live theater in Philadelphia and New York City. She has acted with every member of her family; in 2004, she headlined with her father in a well-received regional theater production of Proof at the Montgomery Theater in Souderton, Pennsylvania, just north of her adopted hometown of Lansdale.

Weil's first television role was in 1994, in an episode of The Adventures of Pete & Pete called "Yellow Fever". She played a bully; her mother Lisa played a teacher. She also played a second role later in the series as a love interest to Big Pete in the episode "35 Hours". Her younger sister Samantha shared the screen with Liza in the Gilmore Girls' third-season finale, "Those Are Strings, Pinocchio". Samantha Weil played a student named Bernadette (unrelated to her sister's character Paris) making a video yearbook entry in front of an impatient Paris, who is standing off to the side waiting to make her own entry.

An alumna of Columbia University, Weil received her first major feature film role co-starring with Kevin Bacon in Stir of Echoes. Before that role, she starred in the 1998 independent film, Whatever. Her first film was the 1996 short film, A Cure For Serpents, where she played a daughter of a mysophobic woman bringing home a boyfriend who was not as obsessive with cleanliness. She also appeared in several other short and feature-length independent films, such as Motel Jerusalem, Scar, and Lullaby. After her work in Whatever and Stir of Echoes, Warner Bros. signed Weil to a talent holding deal and she moved to Los Angeles, where she guest-starred on series produced by that studio, including ER and The West Wing, before being cast on Gilmore Girls.

Weil was originally considered for the role of Rory Gilmore by Gilmore Girls creator Amy Sherman-Palladino before Alexis Bledel won the role; the character of Paris Geller was created especially for Weil.

In 2006, Weil was featured in the horror themed short film, Grace, in which her character suffers a miscarriage, yet decides to carry the baby to term with terrifying results. The film, which also featured Brian Austin Green, premiered at the Fangoria Weekend of Horrors convention on June 2, 2006, and is the basis for the 2009 feature film of the same name. She also had a minor role as a humane society worker in the Molly Shannon film Year of the Dog, and appeared as Doris Delay in the 2008 biographical film Neal Cassady, and as a reporter in the 2010 live-action rotoscoping film Mars.

Weil also voiced a public service announcement in support of the American Diabetes Association's Step Up to Fight Diabetes staircase climb event, which took place in Center City Philadelphia on October 20, 2007.

In 2009, Weil returned to her roots as a regular guest star in various television series, including appearances in Eleventh Hour, CSI, In Plain Sight, Grey's Anatomy, and Private Practice. In February 2010, she began a run as Dr. Glass on the popular Internet series Anyone But Me; series creator Susan Miller had officiated at Weil's wedding to Paul Adelstein in 2006.

In March 2011, Weil was cast as Amanda Tanner, a White House aide, in ABC's Scandal, a series written and produced by Shonda Rhimes. Weil had a recurring role in the series' first season.

Weil played a supporting role in the horror film Smiley, and started 2013 as a recurring guest star in the last half of the only season of Amy Sherman-Palladino's ABC Family series Bunheads as Milly, the sister of Truly Stone.

She is also a frequent collaborator of independent film director Noah Buschel, having appeared in most of his work. She co-produced and starred in his 2014 low-budget project The Situation is Liquid.

In February 2014, Weil was cast as Bonnie Winterbottom, an assistant to Annalise Keating (Viola Davis) in the ABC series How to Get Away with Murder, which premiered during the 2014–15 television season. She also reprised her role as Paris Geller in the "Winter" and "Spring" episodes of the Netflix revival series Gilmore Girls: A Year in the Life.

In 2019, it was revealed that Weil would appear in the third season of the Amazon Prime Video series The Marvelous Mrs. Maisel as Carole Keen (a character created in tribute to bass guitarist Carol Kaye, though Kaye voiced objections to the overall character and portrayal), making that series Weil's third collaboration with the Palladinos.

In early 2022, she began a recurring role as FBI agent Katherine Russo in the Fox series The Cleaning Lady.

== Personal life ==
Weil married actor Paul Adelstein in a Reform Jewish ceremony in November 2006. They had previously known each other through theatrical projects. The two went on to appear together in three film projects: the short film Order Up (2007), the Gregory Dark-helmed Little Fish, Strange Pond (2008), and The Missing Person (2008). She also appeared in a 2011 episode of Private Practice, although she and Adelstein had no scenes together. In April 2010, the couple had a daughter. Weil filed for divorce from Adelstein in March 2016, citing irreconcilable differences. The divorce was finalized in November 2017.

Weil dated her How to Get Away with Murder co-star Charlie Weber from mid-2016 to February 2019.

Weil's niece is actress Scarlett Estevez.

== Filmography ==
=== Film ===
Year	Title	Role	Notes
1996	A Cure for Serpents		Short film
1998	Whatever	Anna Stockard	
1999	Stir of Echoes	Debbie Kozac	
2002	Dragonfly	Suicide Girl	
2002	Lullaby	Rane	
2006	Grace	Madeline Matheson	Short film
2007	Year of the Dog	Trishelle	
2007	Order Up	Hippie Patron	Short film
2007	Neal Cassady	Doris Delay	
2008	Mars	Jewel	
2009	Little Fish, Strange Pond	Norma	Direct-to-DVD
2009	The Missing Person	Agent Chambers	
2012	Advantage: Weinberg	Sylvia Weinberg	Voice role; short film
2012	Smiley	Dr. Jenkins	
2021	Women Is Losers	Minerva	
2023	The Passenger	Miss Beard	
2025	Looking Through Water	Sarah McKay	
2026	Lunar Sway	Marg	

=== Television ===
Year	Title	Role	Notes
1994	The Adventures of Pete & Pete	Bully; Margie Corsell	2 episodes
1995	As the World Turns	Student	1 episode
2000	The West Wing	Karen Larson	Episode: "Take out the Trash Day"
2000–02	ER	Samantha Sobriki	3 episodes
2000–07	Gilmore Girls	Paris Geller	96 episodes
2001	Law & Order: Special Victims Unit	Lara Todd	Episode: "Tangled"
2009	Eleventh Hour	Ashley Filmore	Episode: "H2O"
2009	CSI: Crime Scene Investigation	Risa Parvess	Episode: "A Space Oddity"
2009	In Plain Sight	Angela Atkins	Episode: "Gilted Lily"
2009	Grey's Anatomy	Alison Clark	Episode: "Here's to Future Days"
2010	Anyone But Me	Dr. Glass	Web series; 4 episodes
2011	Private Practice	Andi	Episode: "Two Steps Back"
2012	Scandal	Amanda Tanner	6 episodes
2013	Bunheads	Milly Stone	6 episodes
2014–20	How to Get Away with Murder	Bonnie Winterbottom	Main role; 90 episodes
2016	Gilmore Girls: A Year in the Life	Paris Geller	3 episodes
2016	The Tonight Show Starring Jimmy Fallon	Guest with Scott Patterson and Sean Gunn	November 22, 2016
2019	The Marvelous Mrs. Maisel	Carole Keen	4 episodes
2022–25	The Cleaning Lady	Katherine Russo	recurring role
2022	Westworld	Deborah	2 episodes
