= Annalise Keating =

Fictional character in How to Get Away with Murder

- How to Get Away with Murder character
- Viola Davis as Annalise in the latter half of the first season.
- First appearance: "Pilot" (1.01); September 25, 2014
- Last appearance: "Stay" (6.15); May 14, 2020
- Created by: Peter Nowalk
- Portrayed by: Viola Davis

In-universe information
- Title(s): Professor Annalise Keating, Esq.
- Occupation: Defense attorney Professor
- Family: Mac Harkness (father); Ophelia Harkness (mother); Thelonius Harkness (brother); Celestine Harkness (sister)
- Spouse: Sam Keating
- Significant others: Solomon Vick; Nate Lahey; Eve Rothlo; Emmett Crawford; Robert Hsieh; Tegan Price
- Children: Sam Keating Jr. (son; deceased)
- Relatives: Clyde Harkness (uncle; deceased); Lynn (aunt); Josephine (aunt); Kenya (cousin); Jericho (first cousin once removed); Lavinia (first cousin once removed)
- Nationality: American
- Education: University of Tennessee; Harvard Law School

Annalise Keating, Esq., is a fictional character in the legal drama thriller series How to Get Away with Murder. The character was created and developed by Peter Nowalk and portrayed by American actress Viola Davis throughout the series' run. Annalise is introduced as a complex, high-profile criminal defense attorney and law professor at the fictional Middleton University, known for her social prestige and navigation of university politics.

The main narrative begins when Annalise selects five of her students to assist with cases at her firm, drawing them into a series of interconnected murders. Throughout the series, Annalise serves as a protective mentor to her students while balancing the demands of her professional career, personal struggles, and public scrutiny.

Annalise has been recognized as a groundbreaking character in television history, praised for advancing the representation of African-American women and LGBTQ+ individuals in mainstream media. Davis’s portrayal earned critical acclaim, culminating in her becoming the first African-American woman to win the Primetime Emmy Award for Outstanding Lead Actress in a Drama Series in 2015. The character's complexity, vulnerability, and professional strength have been cited as redefining portrayals of women in legal dramas.

== Characterization ==
On February 25, 2014, it was announced that Viola Davis had been cast in the leading role of Professor Annalise Keating. Annalise is introduced as a self-sufficient and highly respected criminal defense attorney and law professor, admired for her professional acumen and commanding presence. Over the course of the series, the character undergoes significant emotional changes, with her struggles with trauma and alcohol addiction becoming more pronounced as she becomes increasingly entangled in criminal activity alongside her associates.

== Storylines ==
=== Background ===
Annalise was born Anna Mae Harkness, the daughter of Ophelia and Mac, and the sister of Celestine and Thelonious. Her father was absent during much of her life. As a child, she was sexually abused by her uncle Clyde, who was living with them. Ophelia saw Clyde leaving her room and realized what had happened, which led her to take her children away and burn down the house with Clyde inside. At law school, Annalise started a relationship with Eve Rothlo, but they broke up after Annalise fell in love with Sam Keating, who was married and left his wife to marry Annalise.

=== Season 1 ===
This season is set chronologically before and after the murder of Sam Keating. In flashbacks, Annalise is introduced as a criminal defense teacher at Middleton University who chooses students Laurel Castillo, Michaela Pratt, Connor Walsh, Asher Millstone, and Wes Gibbins to work exclusively in her law firm, where she is assisted by associates Frank Delfino and Bonnie Winterbottom. The body of Lila Stangard, a student who had been missing for months, is found and eventually it is revealed that Annalise's husband Sam was having an affair with Lila before she died. Lila's best friend Rebecca Sutter gets romantically involved with Gibbins while the local police department is investigating both Sutter and Lila's ex-boyfriend Griffin O'Reilly. When Sam starts suspecting that Rebecca is aware of his affair with Lila, he becomes violent towards her and attacks her one night when she tries to transfer his laptop data to a flash drive. Gibbins, Walsh, Pratt and Castillo appear to help Rebecca and during the showdown Michaela pushes Sam over the banister and onto the floor below. Sam is presumed dead, and the five ponder their next move, only to have Sam leap up and attack Rebecca. Wes clobbers Sam on the head with a trophy, killing him. The five burn his body in the woods under Annalise's complicity, who is aware of the murder and helps them to build up an alibi.

In flash-forwards, Annalise deals with the police investigating Sam's whereabouts, which Annalise makes look connected to Lila's death by making their affair public. Sam's sister Hannah Keating arrives in town searching for the truth and accusing Annalise of lying. The remains of Sam are found and Annalise incriminates her lover Nate Lahey as a way to avoid her student's arrest. However, she tries to help him go free by offering him a number of a fellow lawyer. She calls her mother to counsel her throughout this moment, though they have multiple arguments. One night, Wes calls her frightened and asks her to go to his apartment. There, she finds him and the others and learns that they strapped Rebecca with tape and locked her in the bathroom. Subsequently, the group takes Rebecca to the Keatings' household's basement, where they keep her while trying to build a case against her, framing her of killing Lila, a theory that they start believing when multiples proofs show up. When they decide to let her go after not finding anything concrete, Rebecca is gone. Annalise blames Wes for her whereabouts, whilst in fact she and Frank hid the body of Rebecca, who was killed by someone unknown to them.

=== Season 2 ===
The first nine episodes focus on Annalise's case of Caleb and Catherine Hapstall and their alleged involvement in the death of their adoptive parents. The flash-forwards show Annalise getting shot in the stomach at Hapstall's mansion. The second part of the season focuses on Wes' investigation around his mother's suicide ten years prior, and it gets revealed from flashbacks how Annalise was involved with Wes' mother's suicide, as Wes' mother gets pressured to testify in Annalise's case against the Mahoney family. The season ends with Annalise finding that Frank was responsible for her being in a car accident and losing her baby.

=== Season 3 ===
This season contains flash-forwards of Annalise’s house burning down, with an unknown male having died inside the house at the time of the fire. Annalise appears devastated by the death of the unknown male, sobbing and threatening the police to dare arrest her for burning down her own house, which they subsequently do.

In the main timeline, Annalise's position at the university is threatened after an unknown person targets her with a series of flyers identifying her as a killer. She admits to the university that she is struggling with alcoholism. Frank has also gone missing with Annalise and Nate trying to find him, while the murder of Wallace Mahoney is still under investigation. In the mid-season finale, Annalise is arrested after Wes' corpse is retrieved from her burning house. However, Nate discovers that Wes was already dead before the fire started.

The second part of the season focuses on the investigation about Wes' death, and the identity of his murderer. Annalise, after being arrested, is in jail, denied bail, depressed and unwilling to use the communal toilet in her cell.

=== Season 6 ===
In flash-forwards, Annalise is shown to be dead under unknown circumstances with a funeral being held in her honor. In the present, Annalise has to deal with an FBI investigation and ultimately charges of being responsible for the deaths of Sam Keating, Ronald Miller, Asher Millstone, Rebecca Sutter, ADA Emily Sinclair, and Caleb Hapstall. With the FBI pressuring the Keating 3 and faced with her own demons, Annalise is left reevaluating her choices in life; ultimately, Annalise is exonerated after an impassioned closing argument in which Annalise confesses the crimes she has committed and opens herself up to the world for the first time. Minutes later, Annalise loses both Frank and Bonnie after they are killed in a shootout instigated by Frank when he killed the corrupt governor who set up Annalise and murdered Nate's father.

It is subsequently revealed that the flash-forwards to Annalise's funeral take place many years into the future after Annalise has lived a long life alongside Eve. Amongst those in attendance are Eve, Laurel, Connor, Oliver, and Christopher Castillo, Wes and Laurel's son. After Annalise's funeral, Christopher, who was mentored by Annalise throughout his life, becomes the professor of her old law class which he names How to Get Away With Murder in Annalise's honor. As Christopher starts his first class, he sees Annalise smiling at him for a brief moment amongst the students before she vanishes.

== Reception ==
Year	Award	Category	Result	Ref.
2015	BET Awards 2015	Best Actress	Nominated	
2015	5th Critics' Choice Television Awards	Best Actress in a Drama Series	Nominated	
2015	GALECA Award	TV Performance of the Year – Actress	Nominated	
2015	72nd Golden Globe Awards	Best Actress in a Television Series – Drama	Nominated	
2015	46th NAACP Image Awards	Outstanding Actress in a Drama Series	Won	
2015	OFTA Television Award	Best Actress in a Drama Series	Nominated	
2015	41st People's Choice Awards	Favorite Actress In A New TV Series	Won	
2015	67th Primetime Emmy Awards	Outstanding Lead Actress in a Drama Series	Won	
2015	21st Screen Actors Guild Awards	Outstanding Performance by a Female Actor in a Drama Series	Won	
2016	21st Critics' Choice Awards	Best Actress in a Drama Series	Won	
2016	BET Awards 2016	Best Actress	Won	
2016	Gold Derby Awards	Best Drama Actress	Nominated	
2016	73rd Golden Globe Awards	Best Actress in a Television Series – Drama	Nominated	
2016	47th NAACP Image Awards	Outstanding Actress in a Drama Series	Nominated	
2016	42nd People's Choice Awards	Favorite Dramatic TV Actress	Nominated	
2016	69th Primetime Emmy Awards	Outstanding Lead Actress in a Drama Series	Nominated	
2017	48th NAACP Image Awards	Outstanding Actress in a Drama Series	Nominated	
2017	69th Primetime Emmy Awards	Outstanding Lead Actress in a Drama Series	Nominated	
2018	49th NAACP Image Awards	Outstanding Actress in a Drama Series	Nominated	
2019	BET Awards 2019	Best Actress	Nominated	
2019	50th NAACP Image Awards	Outstanding Actress in a Drama Series	Nominated	
2019	71st Primetime Emmy Awards	Outstanding Lead Actress in a Drama Series	Nominated	
2020	Black Reel Awards of 2020	Outstanding Actress, Drama Series	Nominated	
2020	51st NAACP Image Awards	Outstanding Actress in a Drama Series	Nominated	
2021	BET Awards 2021	Best Actress	Nominated	
2021	52nd NAACP Image Awards	Outstanding Actress in a Drama Series	Won	
