= Joe Russo (writer) =

Joe Russo is an American writer and producer. He wrote and co-wrote The Inheritance, Hard Kill, The Locksmith and Soul Mates.
