= Saturday Night Live parodies of George H. W. Bush =

US television skits

Saturday Night Live parodies of George H. W. Bush began in 1980 with his vice presidency under Ronald Reagan. The portrayals continued through his presidential campaigns in 1980, 1988, and 1992. SNL has aired dozens of George H. W. Bush parodies by several actors including Jim Downey, Dana Carvey, and Fred Armisen.

== History ==
During the 1980 Republican Party presidential primaries, Bush was portrayed by Jim Downey for two sketches.

Starting in 1987, Bush (then vice president) would be portrayed by then-sophomore cast member Dana Carvey, but his presence would greatly increase following Bush's bid for the presidency in 1988 and subsequent victory in a mock Oval Office Address. After leaving office in 1993, Carvey played him on occasion, including the 2000 United States Presidential campaign, where he would assist Governor George W. Bush (impersonated by Will Ferrell) during his presidential campaign. In 2010, Carvey reprised his role in Funny or Die's web short, Presidential Reunion.

Fred Armisen was the third person to play the former president during a 2005 cold opener side by side Darrell Hammond impersonating former president Bill Clinton and Will Forte impersonating president George W. Bush.

== Reception ==
George H. W. Bush was a fan of Carvey's performance, imitating the impression of himself while giving a eulogy at President Gerald Ford's funeral. After losing his bid for re-election to Bill Clinton in 1992, Bush invited Carvey to the White House for the Christmas party. The two would remain very close family friends until Bush's death in 2018, when Carvey called his quarter-century relationship with the former president "an honor and a privilege".
