= Ivan Leung =

Film director and screenwriter

- Born: San Diego, CA
- Occupations: Actor, writer, director
- Years active: 2009–present

Ivan Leung is an American actor, film director, and screenwriter. He is based in Los Angeles.

== Early life ==
Leung was born and raised in San Diego, California. He started out as a dancer and moved to Los Angeles to train in hip hop choreography, where he began to pursue acting.

== Career ==
Leung appeared in the 2021 film The Tender Bar as Jimmy, a Yale student. The film was directed by George Clooney and stars Ben Affleck and Tye Sheridan. He has appeared on television series including Grey's Anatomy, Superstore, Good Girls, Not Dead Yet, The Sex Lives of College Girls, and The Goldbergs.

Leung co-wrote, co-directed, produced and stars in the 2024 meta stoner comedy Extremely Unique Dynamic. He wrote it with his co-star Harrison Xu, and directed it alongside Xu and co-directed by Katherine Dudas. Production on the film began in February 2023, it premiered at the Sonoma International Film Festival in March 2024, and was distributed by Strand Releasing, with a US release on January 10, 2025. Xu and Leung produced the film through their Heroic Impact production company. Leung and Xu are longtime friends.

Leung is featured in the horror films Skill House, written and directed by Josh Stolberg and starring 50 Cent, Bryce Hall, and Paige VanZant, and Near Death, directed by Shaina Aidan.

== Filmography ==
=== Film ===
Year	Title	Role	Notes
2017	Ordinary Lovers	Restaurant Patron	
2017	All Saints	Translator	
2018	SuperFly	Cryptocurrency Miner	
2021	The Disappearance of Mrs. Wu	Andy Young	
2021	The Tender Bar	Jimmy	
2024	Extremely Unique Dynamic	Daniel	Also director, writer, producer
2025	Skill House	Keo	
TBA	Tricked & Treated	Hiro	
TBA	Near Death	Clint	

=== Television ===
Year	Title	Role	Notes
2017	Kevin (Probably) Saves the World	Tour Guide	Season 1 (1 episode)
2018	Criminal Minds	Larry	Season 13 (1 episode)
2018	All American	Zach	Season 1 (1 episode)
2018	Superstore	Teenage Customer	Season 4 (1 episode)
2019	Good Girls	Customer	Season 2 (1 episode)
2020	The Connors	Vet Assistant	Season 3 (1 episode)
2021	Grey's Anatomy	Jerry Bletzer	Seasons 17 (1 episode)
2022	The Goldbergs	Trip	Season 9 (1 episode)
2022	The Sex Lives of College Girls	Jimin	Season 2 (1 episode)
2023	Not Dead Yet	Dirk	Season 1 (1 episode)
