= Chris LaMont =

American filmmaker

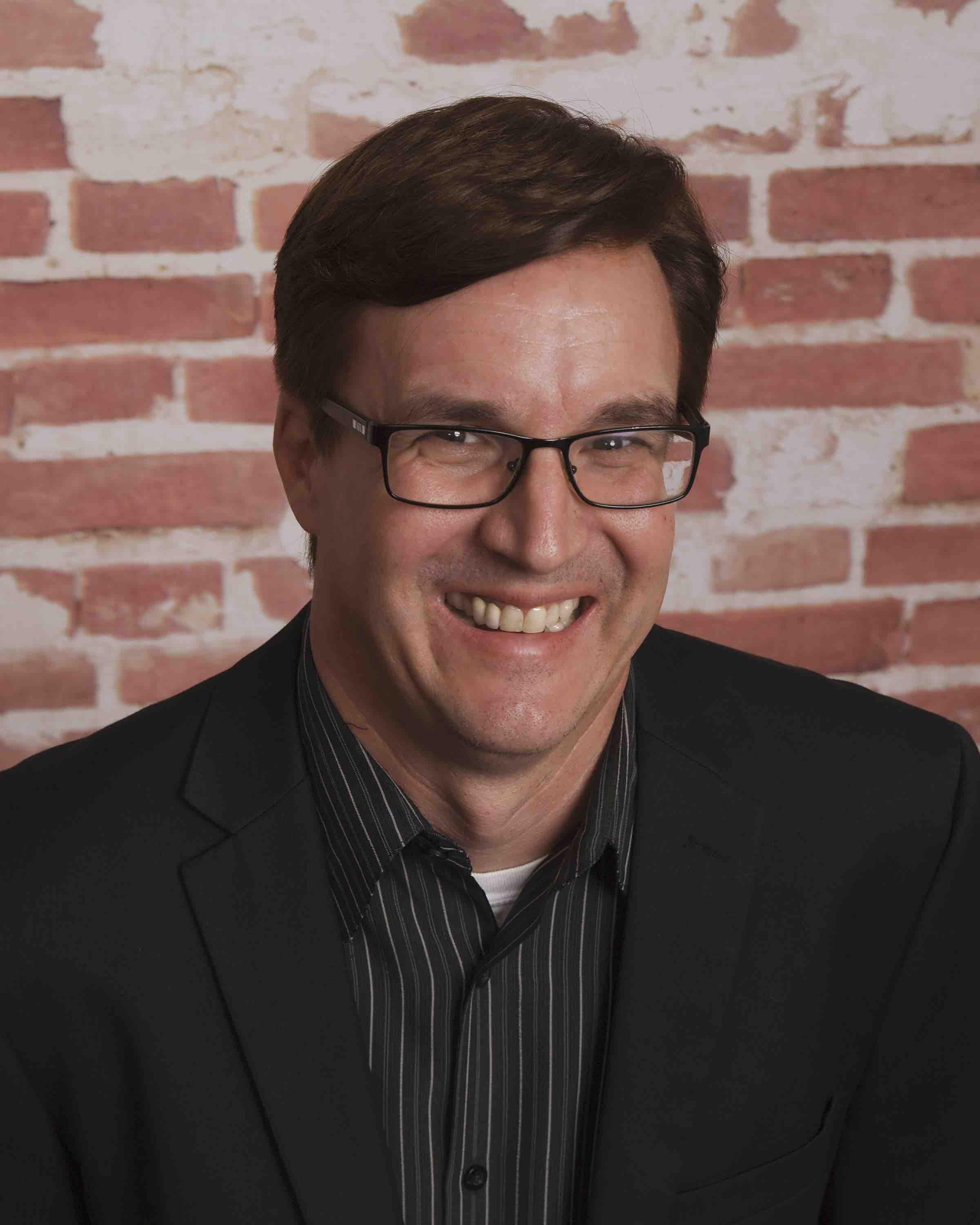
- Born: Phoenix, Arizona, U.S.
- Occupations: Filmmaker, Professor

Chris LaMont is an American screenwriter, independent filmmaker, and film professor, who co-founded the Phoenix Film Festival in 2000. He has written and co-written several feature films, including Soul Mates, The Inheritance, The Au Pair Nightmare, The Locksmith, and Hard Kill. He has also produced and directed several independent films, My Apocalypse, Netherbeast Incorporated, and The Graves.

== Early life ==
Born in Edison, New Jersey and growing up in Phoenix, Arizona, LaMont graduated from Arizona State University. While there, he won a Rocky Mountain Emmy Award for Student Entertainment Production for the sketch comedy series, TV or Not TV. He directed his first feature with Steve Bencich, The Best Movie Ever Made featuring Adam West. His next feature is the horror film, Writer's Block, was released to video stores.

== Career ==
In 2000, LaMont directed and co-wrote Film Club, a short film parody of David Fincher's Fight Club. Later, he directed the documentary feature 14 Days in America, and in 2006 he produced with Brian and Dean Ronalds the office-vampire comedy Netherbeast Incorporated, which was released in North America in January 2009 by Illuminata Films.

In 2008, he produced the animated logos for "R&D TV" that appear on the end of the Season 4 episodes of SyFy Channel's Battlestar Galactica. His film My Apocalypse was a dark comedy/drama, which had its world premiere at the 2008 Boston Underground Film Festival.

In 2009 he produced the film The Graves for first-time feature filmmaker, writer-director Brian Pulido, with the Ronalds Brothers. The supernatural suspense film follows two sisters who are captured in an old ghost town controlled by a religious zealot and his brainwashed clan. The film was released in 2010 by AfterDark Films as one of the "Horrorfest 2010: Eight Films To Die For".

In 2014, he produced the independent suspense-thriller Justice Served, with writer-director Marvin Young, starring Chase Coleman, Lochlyn Munro, Gail O'Grady and Lance Henriksen. In 2015 he produced the micro-budget feature Postmarked for writer-director Gene Ganssle.

In 2015, he started to focus on screenplay writing. He and his writing partner Joseph Russo were named to the 2016 Young and Hungry List. Their feature screenplay "Road Rage" was a Tpe 10 horror/suspense finalist in the annual Final Draft Big Break Contest. Their screenplay, "Soul Mates", was named to Hollywood's annual Blood List as one of the Top 13 unproduced genre films in Hollywood and to The Hit List as one of the Top Unproduced Screenplays in Hollywood. Their horror action film "The Red Pill" was named to the 2017 Blood List and their horror screenplay "The Last Will and Testament of Charles Abernathy" was named on the 2018 Blood List.

2019 saw their script "The Au Pair Nightmare" filmed in New Mexico with writing partner Joseph Russo directing. The film premiered on the Lifetime Network in 2020. It was later available on the streaming Lifetime Movie Channel.

In January 2020, the pair's action-thriller Hard Kill starring Bruce Willis and Jesse Metcalf was directed by Matt Eskardi and shot in Cincinnati. The film was released from Vertical Entertainment on August 28, 2020, theatrically and on VOD.

In 2023, Russo and LaMont worked on the screenplay for The Locksmith starring Ryan Philippe, Kate Bosworth and Ving Rhames. Also in 2023, their award-winning horror screenplay Soul Mates was produced. The film, described as "Saw meets Online Dating" was directed by Mark Gantt and starts Neal McDonough, Annie Ilonzeh, and Charlie Weber. It was released theatrically in 2023 and can be rented and purchased from Amazon and ITunes and can also be found on the BET+ streaming network.

In 2023, Russo and LaMont's award-winning screenplay "The Last Will and Testament of Charles Abernathy" became was purchased by Netflix and was released as The Inheritance theatrically and is streaming on Hulu. The supernatural horror film about a billionaire on the evening of his 75th Birthday and brings his estranged children back to protect him from someone trying to kill him was directed by Alejandro Brugués and stars Peyton List, Briana Middleton, Rachel Nichols and Bob Gunton.

LaMont and Russo currently have several screenplays in various stages of development.

== Organization work ==
In 2000, LaMont co-founded the Phoenix Film Festival, which had over 23,000 attendees in 2013. In past years, actors and directors including Tom Arnold, Kevin Bacon, Alan Cumming, Laurence Fishburne, Peter Fonda, Robert Forster, John Landis, Kyra Sedgwick, Jane Seymour, and John Waters have appeared.

He was the founding executive director of the festival, and President of the non-profit Phoenix Film Foundation, which he also co-founded. In 2002, he started the Phoenix Film Project, an independent filmmaker community group, which has officially changed to IFP-Phoenix, and started the Phoenix Film Society in 2004. and he is currently serving on the advisory board.

With comic book writer Brian Pulido, he co-founded and is the executive director of the International Horror and Sci-Fi Film Festival. The festival attracted over 4,000 attendees in 2006 and has featured such celebrities as Mick Garris, Tobe Hooper, Nightmare on Elm Street's Heather Langenkamp, and Star Wars' Chewbacca Peter Mayhew. In 2007, he founded the Arizona Student Film Festival to encourage young statewide filmmakers. In 2011, the International Horror and Sci-Fi Film Festival became the late night programming arm of the Phoenix Film Festival.

== Teaching ==
Chris LaMont has taught at Arizona State University since 2004 in the ASU Sidney Poitier New American Film School - such courses as Film: The Creative Process, Intermediate Screenwriting, Producing for Film & Media, Careers in Media Industry and created two online classes: Great Comedy Films and Alfred Hitchcock.

== Filmography ==
=== Writer ===
- The Best Movie Ever Made (1994)
- Writer's Block (1995)
- Film Club (short) (2000)
- Mating Rituals (2001)
- Paychecked! (short) (2005)
- My Apocalypse (2008)
- Take Out (short) (2009)
- Who's There? (short) (2016)
- Be Mine (short) (2017)
- The Au Pair Nightmare (2020)
- Hard Kill (2020)
- The Locksmith (2023)
- Soul Mates (2023)
- The Inheritance (2024)

=== Producer ===
- The Best Movie Ever Made (1994) ...aka The Battle for the Planet of Cheese
- Writer's Block (1995) ...aka Writer's Block: Truth or Dare 2 (United States: video box title)
- Paychecked! (short) (2006)
- Screen Wars - Phoenix TV Series (2005 - 2007)
- Netherbeast Incorporated (2006)
- My Apocalypse (2008)
- The Graves (2009)
- Justice Served (2015)
- Postmarked (2016)

=== Director ===
- The Best Movie Ever Made (1994)
- Writer's Block (1995)
- Film Club (2000)
- 14 Days in America (2005)
- Paychecked! (2006)
- My Apocalypse (2008)
