= Extremely Unique Dynamic =

- Theatrical release poster
- Directed by: Katherine Dudas; Ivan Leung; Harrison Xu
- Written by: Katherine Dudas; Ivan Leung; Harrison Xu
- Produced by: Noel Do-Murakami; Ivan Leung; Harrison Xu
- Starring: Ivan Leung; Harrison Xu; Hudson Yang; Nathan Doan
- Cinematography: Steven Shulgach
- Edited by: Michael Scotti Jr.
- Music by: Ian Mackley
- Production company: Heroic Impact
- Distributed by: Strand Releasing
- Release dates: March 21, 2024 (Sonoma International); January 10, 2025 (United States)
- Running time: 73 minutes
- Country: United States
- Language: English
- Box office: $38,207

Extremely Unique Dynamic is a 2024 American stoner meta-comedy film written and directed by Katherine Dudas, Ivan Leung, and Harrison Xu, and starring Leung and Xu. It premiered at the Sonoma International Film Festival on March 21, 2024, and was released theatrically on January 10, 2025.

== Plot ==
Longtime best friends Danny and Ryan are spending the weekend together before Ryan moves to Edmonton, Alberta. They decide to make a movie about making a movie that stars two friends who are making a movie.

== Cast ==
- Ivan Leung as Daniel
- Harrison Xu as Ryan
- Hudson Yang as Himself
- Nathan Doan as Dan

== Production ==
Ivan Leung and Harrison Xu wrote and directed the film, and also star in it, each playing three roles. They formed the production company Heroic Impact to make the film, which is both of their feature filmmaking debuts. It is the second feature film for the film's third co-writer and co-director, Katherine Dudas (after her 2022 feature debut Juniper). The film was produced by Leung, Xu, and Noel Do-Murakami.

Leung and Xu wrote the screenplay in a month, and started filming about three weeks later. They shot the film in five days, often with two cameras, and later did several days of reshoots. They self-financed the film.

== Release ==
The film premiered at the Sonoma International Film Festival on March 21, 2024. On June 19, 2024, it was announced that North American rights had been acquired by Strand Releasing. The film was released in the United States on January 10, 2025. It made $38,207 from a single theater in its opening weekend. In April 2025, the film will be presented at the LGBT+ Film Festival in Poland.

== Reception ==
On the review aggregator website Rotten Tomatoes, 91% of 11 critics' reviews are positive.

== Accolades ==
Year	Award	Category	Recipient(s)	Result	Ref.
2024	Rhode Island International Film Festival	Alternative Spirit Award	Extremely Unique Dynamic	Won	
2024	Montclair Film Festival	Future/Now Competition	Extremely Unique Dynamic	Won	
2025	Queerty Awards	Comedy Movie	Extremely Unique Dynamic	Nominated	
