= Brian Ronalds =

American film producer (born 1973)

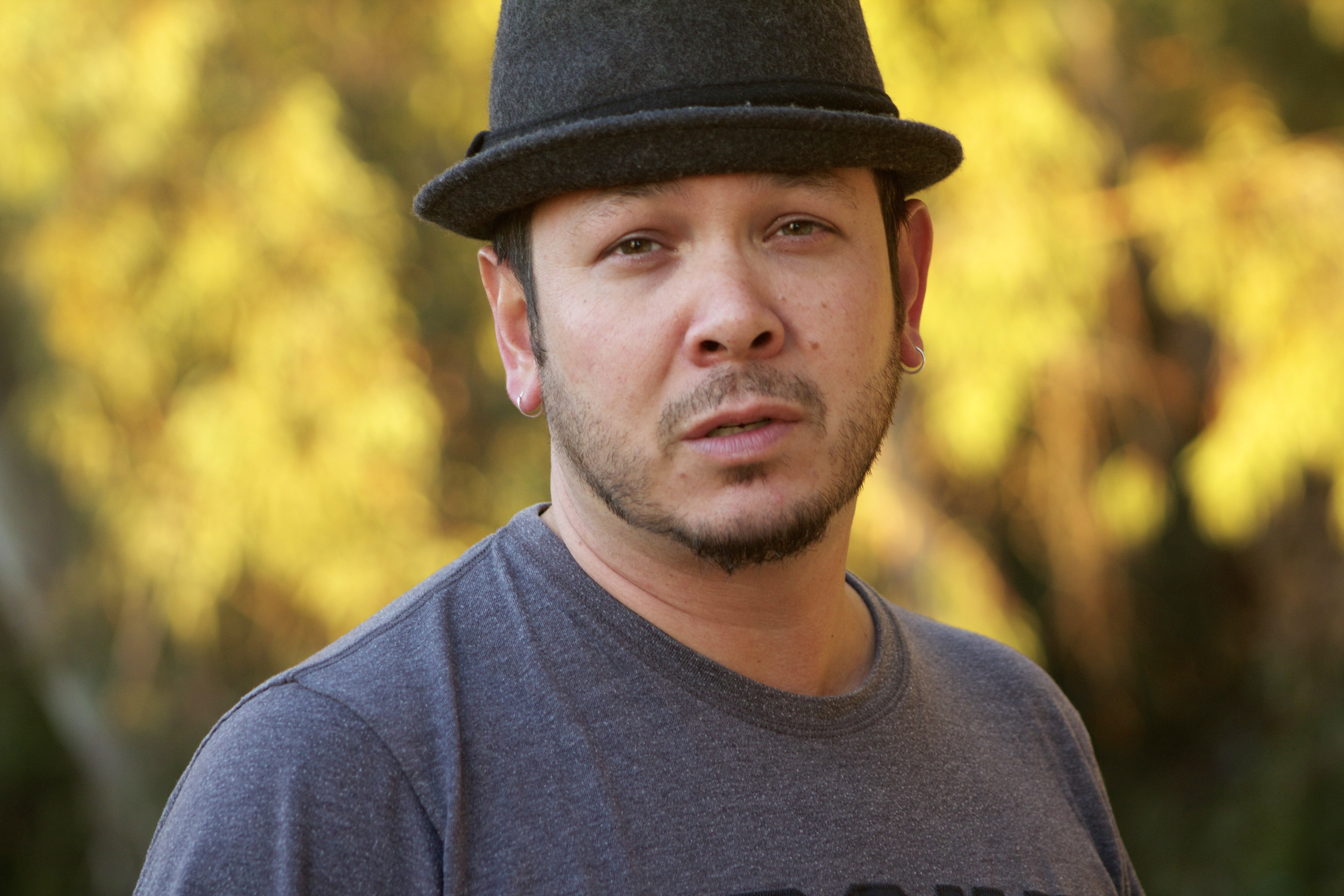
- Ronalds in November 2012
- Born: July 6, 1973 (age 53); Los Angeles
- Occupations: Actor, Producer, director
- Years active: 2001–present
- Height: 5 ft 11 in (1.80 m)
- Spouse(s): Michelle Palermo (m 2020-present), Stephanie Nau (m 1997 - 2013)
- Children: Leif Ronalds, Logan Ronalds, Paige Palermo, Thaine Palermo
- Website: Ronalds Brothers

Brian Ronalds (born July 6, 1973) is an American producer, director, publicist, writer, former actor, and is one half of "The Ronalds Brothers". In 2007, Ronalds produced and co-starred in the horror-comedy Netherbeast Incorporated, released in 2007 and directed by his brother Dean and starring Darrell Hammond, Judd Nelson, Dave Foley, Robert Wagner, Jason Mewes, Amy Davidson and Steve Burns.

== Career ==
After having success with his first film he went on to produce and co-star in Brian Pulido's horror film The Graves starring Bill Moseley, Tony Todd, Amanda Wyss, Clare Grant and Jillian Murray. In 2008, Brian and his brother Dean were brought on as staff writers for Tyler Perry's "Meet the Browns Season 2" and spent a little time in Atlanta, Georgia at Tyler Perry Studios.

In 2010, Brian co-starred and produced the crime-thriller "Dirty Little Trick" starring Dean Cain, Michael Madsen and Christie Burson. In 2011, Ronalds produced the feature film "Ashley" with Tom Malloy, directed by his brother Dean, and starring America's Next Top Model winner, Nicole Fox, Two and a Half Men's Jennifer Taylor, Tom Malloy and Michael Madsen.

== Personal life ==
Ronalds was born in Los Angeles, CA, grew up in Littleton, Colorado, graduated from Columbine Highschool, received his BA in English at the University of Northern Colorado and currently lives in Los Angeles, CA with his two sons Leif & Logan, step-son Thaine, step-daughter Paige, and wife (actress and writer) Michelle Palermo.

== Popularity ==
Ronalds was covered in several popular medias of India when he visited the Bollywood with Tom Malloy.

== Filmography ==
=== Actor ===
Year	Film	Role	Other notes
2003	A.W.O.L.	Frankie Falino	Actor
2004	Split	Doctor/Patient Stand In	Actor
2004	Portrait	Tom	Actor
2004	The Netherbeast of Berm-Tech Industries, Inc.	Daryl	Actor, producer
2005	Little Victim	Duane	Actor
2005	Laws of Deception	Waiter	Actor
2005	Toofy Film Fest 2005: HD Showcase	Brian Ronalds	Actor
2006	The Chase	Marty	Actor
2006	Go-Go Guy	Monte Smohler	Actor
2007	Love and Honor	Pedro	Actor
2007	The Long Shot	Chess Opponent	Actor
2007	Netherbeast Incorporated	Dow Byrum	Actor, producer
2007	Screen Wars: Being Camerahead	Craig	Actor
2007	Bitter Spirits	Larry	Actor
2007	Twisted Soul	Frank Durbon	Actor
2007	Room 602	Paul Xavier	Actor
2007	Michael's Hearing Problem	Lewis	Actor
2007	Star Power	Jett	Actor
2008	SIS	Court Criminal	Actor
2009	Numbers	Hector	Actor
2009	Cocktail Wizard	Tony the Bartender	Actor
2009	The Graves	Pete Tyler	Actor
2010	Eye on Entertainment: 2011 Shriekfest Film Festival (#7.37)	Himself	Actor
2011	Dirty Little Trick	Jimmy T	Actor
2012	Remnant		Actor
2012	Goodbye Promise	Milton	Actor
2013	Crushed Velvet	Wink Philbin	Actor

=== Producer ===
Year	Film	Role	Other notes
2002	Bounty		Co-Producer
2004	Portrait	Tom	Actor, producer
2004	The Netherbeast of Berm-Tech Industries, Inc.	Daryl	Actor, producer
2005	Screen Wars: Comedy Series		TV Episodes / Producer
2008	Raglin Tales		Producer
2009	Cowboy Dreams		Co-executive producer
2012	Ashley		Producer
2013	The Movie		Associate producer (post production)

=== Director ===
Year	Film	Role	Other notes
2003	A.W.O.L.	Frankie Falino	Actor, producer, director
2005	Screen Wars: Horror/Sci-Fi Series		TV Episodes / Director
2006	Go-Go Guy	Monte Smohler	Actor, producer, director, writer
2012	Remixed: Mike Song & Mike Tompkins		TV Episodes / Second Assistant Director
2012	Remixed: Keone Madrid & Mari Martin & Christina Grimmie		TV Episodes / Second Assistant Director
2012	Remixed: Legacy & DeStorm		TV Episodes / Second Assistant Director
2012	Remixed: Madd Chadd & Paul Dateh		TV Episodes / Second Assistant Director
2012	Remixed: Melinda Sullivan & Big Bad VooDoo Daddy		TV Episodes / Second Assistant Director

=== Writer ===
Year	Film	Role	Other notes
2009	Meet the Browns: Meet the Cousins (#2.8)		TV Episodes, Writer

=== Special thanks ===
Year	Film	Role	Other notes
2004	Reveille		Special thanks
2007	A Modern Faerie Tale		Special thanks

== Other accolades ==
Year	Nominee / work	Award	Result
2005	Phoenix Film Foundation	Filmmaker of the Year	Won

== See also ==
- The Graves
- Netherbeast Incorporated
- Going Bongo
