= Bruce Dellis =

American filmmaker

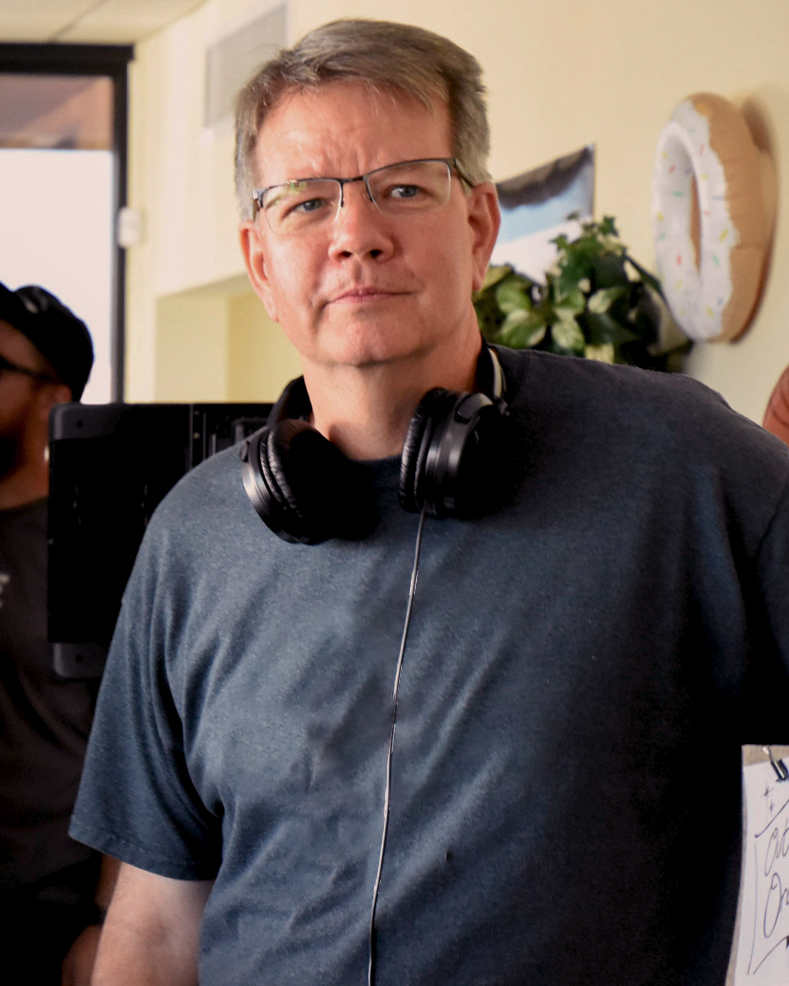
- Dellis on the set of Raising Buchanan
- Occupation(s): Film director and screenwriter
- Years active: 2003–present
- Spouse: Connie Dellis (m. 1990)
- Children: 1

Bruce Dellis is an American film director and screenwriter based in Tempe, AZ. He has written and directed several award-winning short films and features.

== Career ==
In 2006, Dellis won two Rocky Mountain Emmy Awards for The Intervention of Brad. That same year, he was named Arizona Filmmaker of the Year by the Phoenix Film Foundation.

In 2007, he wrote the feature-length film Netherbeast Incorporated, which premiered at the 2007 AFI/Dallas Film Festival. The offbeat comedy stars Darrell Hammond, Judd Nelson, Robert Wagner, Jason Mewes, Dave Foley, Steve Burns, and Amy Davidson.

Dellis won two more Rocky Mountain Emmy Awards in 2008 for his offbeat short film on the PTA called Fuller PTA: Better Than Stepping on a Rusty Nail.

In all, Dellis has been nominated for a total of 14 Rocky Mountain Emmys, winning five.

Dellis wrote and directed a chapter of the anthology film Locker 13. The chapter, titled "The Benevolent Byzantine Order of the Nobles of the Enigmatic Oracle", stars David Huddleston, Bart Johnson, and Curtis Armstrong. Locker 13 was released in 2014.

In 2019, Dellis wrote and directed "Raising Buchanan," a feature film starring René Auberjonois, Amanda Melby, M. Emmet Walsh, Cathy Shim, Terence Bernie Hines, and Robert Ben Garant. It concerns a woman who steals the body of President James Buchanan with the hope of ransoming him for a large payoff, but finds that no one is particularly interested in getting him back. The film has won several awards on the film festival circuit.

== Filmography ==
=== Films ===
Year	Title	Director	Writer	Producer
2019	Raising Buchanan	Yes	Yes	
2014	Locker 13	Yes	Yes	
2010	The Benevolent Byzantine Order of the Nobles of the Enigmatic Oracle	Yes	Yes	
2009	Cocktail Wizard		Yes	
2008	Fuller PTA: Better Than Stepping on a Rusty Nail!	Yes	Yes	Yes
2007	Netherbeast Incorporated		Yes	
2007	Michael's Hearing Problem	Yes	Yes	Yes
2007	Bitter Spirits		Yes	
2007	John Philip Sousa Gets a Haircut	Yes	Yes	Yes
2006	The Intervention of Brad	Yes	Yes	Yes
2005	Doug, Mitch, and the Ironclad Argument	Yes	Yes	Yes
2005	Little Victim		Yes	
2004	The Netherbeast of Berm-Tech Industries, Inc.		Yes	
2004	The Inevitable Reggie Vandervan	Yes	Yes	Yes
2003	Sick Day	Yes	Yes	Yes
2003	The Strange Case of Ray Milland	Yes	Yes	Yes
2003	A. Lincoln: A Life Embellished	Yes	Yes	Yes

== Personal life ==
Dellis is a faculty associate at Arizona State University teaching screenwriting. He is married with one child.
