= Raising Buchanan =

2019 film by Bruce Dellis

- Directed by: Bruce Dellis
- Written by: Bruce Dellis
- Produced by: Joe Gruberman; Amanda Melby; Chadwick Struck; Cathy Shim
- Starring: René Auberjonois; Amanda Melby; Cathy Shim; Terence Bernie Hines; M. Emmet Walsh; Robert Ben Garant; Jennifer Pfalzgraff
- Cinematography: Bret Kalmbach
- Music by: Steve Francois
- Production company: Cheese Board Productions
- Release date: April 12, 2019 (Phoenix Film Festival)
- Running time: 96 minutes
- Country: United States
- Language: English

Raising Buchanan is a 2019 American comedy film produced by Amanda Melby, Joe Gruberman, Chadwick Struck and Cathy Shim, written and directed by Bruce Dellis. The film stars René Auberjonois in the role of the title character, James Buchanan, the 15th president of the United States, and was his final role released in his lifetime. He died in December 2019. The film was Bruce Dellis' first full-length feature. Raising Buchanan was filmed in and near Phoenix, Arizona.

== Plot ==
Ruth Kiesling is a 39-year-old woman with anger issues and a history of making poor decisions. Ruth sees an opportunity to turn her life around by stealing the body of a dead president to hold for ransom. However, she quickly learns that no one is particularly interested in getting him back.

== Cast ==
- René Auberjonois as U.S. President James Buchanan
- Amanda Melby as Ruth Kiesling
- Cathy Shim as Meg
- Terence Bernie Hines as Phillip Crosby
- M. Emmet Walsh as Larry Kiesling
- Robert Ben Garant as Lancaster Guy
- Jennifer Pfalzgraff as Holly
- Steve Briscoe as Errol
- Shannon Whirry as Parnella Monroe
- Lynnette Brown as Gretchen
- Max Bullis as Dante
- Zoey Yeoman as Capt. Jarvis
- Shelly Boucher as Trina
- Laura Durant as Mrs. Warren

== Production ==
Dellis shot the film on location in Phoenix, Scottsdale, Mesa, Tempe, Prescott and Paradise Valley, Arizona. He used an Arizona-based crew and nearly all of the actors were based in Arizona, with the exception of some key talent.

Originally, actor/comedian Andy Dick was slated to play the part of Lancaster Guy, but performance issues and allegations of sexual improprieties caused his firing the day after his scene was shot. The scene was subsequently re-shot using Robert Ben Garant in the role of Lancaster Guy.

== Soundtrack ==
Several songs on the soundtrack concern mining disasters.

- "All This Could Be Yours" (written and performed by Jennifer Trynin)
- "Game of Pricks" (written by Robert Pollard; performed by Guided By Voices)
- "Timothy" (written by Rupert Holmes; performed by The Buoys)
- "Last Day in the Mine" (written by Jimmy Key; performed by Dave Dudley)
- "Explosion in the Fairmont Mine" (written and performed by Blind Alfred Reed)
- "McBeth Mine Explosion" (performed by Cap, Andy, and Flip)
- "Close the Coalhouse Door" (written and performed by Alex Glasgow)
- "Bow Wow" (written by Benjamin Darvill and J. Hogarth; performed by Son of Dave)
- "Cello Sonata No. 1, Op 38" (written by Johannes Brahms; performed by Amanda Melby)
- "Sonata Amanda, 3. Andante" (written by Douglas Durant; performed by Amanda Melby)

== Accolades ==
List of Accolades
| Award / Film Festival | Category | Recipient(s) | Result | Ref. |
|---|---|---|---|---|
| 2019 Phoenix Film Festival | Best Arizona Feature Film | Amanda Melby, Joe Gruberman, Bruce Dellis | Won | |
| 2019 Phoenix Film Festival | Filmmaker of the Year | Joe Gruberman | Won | |
| 2019 Manhattan Film Festival | Best Dramedy | Amanda Melby, Joe Gruberman, Bruce Dellis | Won | |
| 2019 Rocky Mountain Emmy Awards | Talent-Performer or Narrator (trailer) | Amanda Melby | Nominated | |
| 2019 Rocky Mountain Emmy Awards | Writer-Short Form (trailer) | Bruce Dellis | Won | |
| 2020 Garden State Film Festival | Best Supporting Actor | René Auberjonois | Nominated | |
| 2020 WorldFest Houston Int'l Film Festival | Best Feature Film-Comedy (Special Jury Award) | Amanda Melby, Joe Gruberman, Bruce Dellis | Won | |
| 2020 WorldFest Houston Int'l Film Festival | Best Actress | Amanda Melby | Nominated | |
| 2020 WorldFest Houston Int'l Film Festival | Best Supporting Actress | Cathy Shim | Won | |
| 2020 WorldFest Houston Int'l Film Festival | Best Supporting Actor | René Auberjonois | Nominated | |
| 2020 WorldFest Houston Int'l Film Festival | Best Editor | Bruce Dellis | Won | |
