= Neuromancer (TV series) =

Upcoming Apple TV series

- Genre: Cyberpunk
- Created by: Graham Roland; J. D. Dillard
- Based on: Neuromancer by William Gibson
- Showrunner: Graham Roland
- Starring: Callum Turner; Briana Middleton; Joseph Lee; Mark Strong; Clémence Poésy; Peter Sarsgaard; Emma Laird
- Country of origin: United States
- Original language: English

Production
- Executive producers: Graham Roland; J. D. Dillard; David Ellison; Dana Goldberg; Matt Thunell; Aubrey "Drake" Graham; Adel "Future" Nur; Jason Shrier; Zack Hayden; William Gibson
- Production companies: Paramount Television Studios; Anonymous Content; DreamCrew Entertainment

Original release
- Network: Apple TV

Neuromancer is an upcoming American cyberpunk television series created by Graham Roland and J. D. Dillard for Apple TV. The series serves as an adaptation of William Gibson's 1984 novel (with Gibson himself serving as executive producer), with Roland serving as the showrunner and Dillard as the director of the first three episodes. It stars Callum Turner and Briana Middleton. The series consists of ten episodes and is set to premiere on January 22, 2027.

== Premise ==
The series follows Case (Turner), a damaged, top-rung super-hacker who is thrust into a web of digital espionage and high-stakes crime with his partner Molly (Middleton), a razor-girl assassin, to pull a heist on a corporate dynasty with untold secrets.

== Cast and characters ==
=== Main ===
- Callum Turner as Case
- Briana Middleton as Molly
- Joseph Lee as Hideo
- Mark Strong as Armitage
- Clémence Poésy as Marie-France Tessier
- Peter Sarsgaard as John Ashpool
- Emma Laird as Linda Lee

=== Guest ===
- Dane DeHaan as Peter Riviera
- Max Irons as Jean Tessier-Ashpool
- André De Shields as Julius Deane
- Marc Menchaca as Dixie Flatline
- Isabella Pappas as Mitchell
- Prasanna Puwanarajah as Darvin Mitnik
- Sam Woolf as Persson

== Episodes ==
No.	Title	Directed by	Written by	Original release date
1	TBA	J. D. Dillard	Story by : Graham Roland & J. D. Dillard; Teleplay by : Graham Roland	January 22, 2027
2	TBA	J. D. Dillard	Naledi Jackson & Lenore Zion	January 22, 2027
3	TBA	J. D. Dillard	Zu Quirke & J. D. Dillard	January 29, 2027
4	TBA	TBA	Lenore Zion	February 5, 2027
5	TBA	TBA	Naledi Jackson	February 12, 2027
6	TBA	TBA	Zu Quirke	February 19, 2027
7	TBA	TBA	Rah Johnson & Lenore Zion	February 26, 2027
8	TBA	TBA	J. D. Dillard & Graham Roland & Rah Johnson	March 5, 2027
9	TBA	TBA	Naledi Jackson & Zu Quirke	March 12, 2027
10	TBA	TBA	Graham Roland & J. D. Dillard	March 19, 2027

== Production ==
In February 2024, Apple TV gave a series order for a television adaptation of Neuromancer by William Gibson, consisting of 10 episodes. The series was created by Graham Roland and J. D. Dillard, with Roland acting as showrunner, and Dillard directing the first three episodes. Production studios include Anonymous Content, with David Levine, Garrett Kemble and Zack Hayden as executive producers, and DreamCrew Entertainment, with Aubrey "Drake" Graham, Adel "Future" Nur and Jason Shrier as executive producers. Gibson and Jennifer Haley also serve as executive producers.

In April 2024, Callum Turner was cast to star in the series. In June 2024, Briana Middleton joined the cast. In December 2024, Joseph Lee was added to the cast, with Mark Strong signing on in January 2025. Clémence Poésy, Emma Laird, and Peter Sarsgaard were also reported as part the cast in March 2025, with Dane DeHaan, Max Irons, André De Shields, and Marc Menchaca are all joining in their recurring roles.

Filming began in January 2025 on location in Tokyo.

By August 2025, Paramount Television Studios had taken over production of the series following the merger of Skydance Television's parent company Skydance Media with Paramount Global into Paramount Skydance. On July 6, 2026, on the 42nd anniversary of the book's publishing, Apple released a teaser trailer for the series.

== Release ==
The first two episodes will be available to stream on Apple TV starting January 22, 2027, with weekly episodes releasing through March 19.
