= Sharper (film) =

2023 crime thriller film by Benjamin Caron

- Release poster
- Directed by: Benjamin Caron
- Written by: Brian Gatewood; Alessandro Tanaka
- Produced by: Erik Feig; Jessica Switch; Julianne Moore; Bart Freundlich; Brian Gatewood; Alessandro Tanaka
- Starring: Julianne Moore; Sebastian Stan; Justice Smith; Briana Middleton; John Lithgow
- Cinematography: Charlotte Bruus Christensen
- Edited by: Yan Miles
- Music by: Clint Mansell
- Production companies: Apple Studios; Picturestart; FortySixty; G&T Productions
- Distributed by: A24; Apple TV+
- Release dates: February 10, 2023 (United States); February 17, 2023 (Apple TV+)
- Running time: 116 minutes
- Country: United States
- Language: English

Sharper is a 2023 American crime thriller film written by Brian Gatewood and Alessandro Tanaka, and directed by Benjamin Caron. The film stars Julianne Moore (who also served as a producer), Sebastian Stan, Justice Smith, Briana Middleton, and John Lithgow.

Sharper was released in select theaters in the United States on February 10, 2023, by A24, before its streaming release on February 17, 2023, by Apple TV+.

== Plot ==
=== Tom ===
Tom is the owner of a used bookstore in New York City. One day, a woman named Sandra comes in looking for a book, and after initially declining his advances, begins a romance with him. Weeks into their relationship, Sandra tells Tom that her brother is in debt and must pay $350,000 or be killed. Tom reveals that his father is wealthy, and offers to cover the debt. After he gives the money to Sandra, she disappears, pushing Tom into a nervous breakdown.

=== Sandra ===
"Sandra" is revealed to be Sandy, a parolee with a long criminal history. One night, before her relationship with Tom, Sandy is meeting with a corrupt parole officer, who attempts to shake her down for money. The officer is paid off by an apparently wealthy man, Max, who is actually a con artist. Max takes Sandy on as a protégé, and trains her to pull cons. After taking down their first mark together, the two kiss.

=== Max ===
Before his partnership with Sandy, Max visits his mother, Madeline, and her new boyfriend, billionaire Richard Hobbes, at Richard's lavish apartment. A seemingly drunk Max convinces Madeline to allow him to stay at Richard's apartment. The next day, Madeline and Richard come home to Max apparently being arrested for soliciting drugs from an undercover police officer. Madeline quickly realizes that Max is pulling a con to have Richard pay off the officer, Max's partner Tipsy. Madeline forces Max to leave the apartment. It is later revealed that Madeline and Max are not mother and son, but lovers who are targeting Richard.

Richard meets with Max and offers him $60,000 a month to leave town. Max demands a year's salary in cash in advance in order to leave Madeline alone to be with Richard. While meeting with him, Max also meets Richard's son—Tom, who has not yet met Sandy. Max, Madeline, and Tipsy celebrate a successful job, but that evening, Madeline tells Max that Richard wants to marry her, and she will be staying with him. Max escapes from the police Madeline has called and leaves with the money.

=== Madeline ===
Richard dies, leaving the vast majority of his estate to Madeline. Due to Richard's misgivings about Tom after the incident with Sandy, Tom has been left only the bookstore and a trust. He has also been named chairman of Richard's foundation, while Madeline is a trustee.

Tom hires an old family friend, Braddock, to locate "Sandra". Despite Madeline's attempts to convince Tom to call off the investigation, Sandy is found, heavily addicted to heroin. Tom wants her to stay at the apartment while she goes through detox, but Madeline is reticent. She speaks to Sandy, who reveals that she knows the connection between Madeline and Max. In return for her silence, Sandy demands that Madeline track down Max so she can confront him about abandoning her.

Max agrees to meet with Sandy and Madeline. During the meeting, Tom and Braddock arrive to confirm Tom's suspicions that the three had been working together. Tom pulls a gun on Sandy, then on Madeline. Sandy forces the gun out of Tom's hands, and it is picked up by Madeline, who apparently shoots and kills Tom after he forces her to point the gun at him and pull the trigger. Desperate to avoid prison, Madeline immediately transfers all the money to Richard's foundation.

Madeline, Max, and Sandy are put on a plane to Oklahoma City. Madeline reminds Max that she will retain control of the money, since Tom is dead and she is the trustee of Richard's foundation. After a distraught Sandy retreats to the plane's toilet, Madeline realizes that the blood on her sleeve is not real, meaning Tom is alive. When Madeline checks the plane's toilet, Sandy is gone.

=== Sandy ===
The true nature of the scheme is revealed; having fallen in love with Tom, Sandy confesses her true identity to him, and the two devise a plan to con Madeline and Max, enlisting Tipsy and his partner Goldie—who posed as "Braddock"—to assist them. The meeting between Sandy and Max was planned, as was Tom's apparent shooting at Madeline's hands. Since Tom is still alive, he maintains control over the foundation and the money. Tom, Sandy, Tipsy, and Goldie meet at the bookstore to celebrate their success. Tom and Sandy rekindle their relationship.

== Cast ==
- Julianne Moore as Madeline
- Sebastian Stan as Max
- Justice Smith as Tom
- Briana Middleton as Sandra
- Darren Goldstein as Pat Braddock
- John Lithgow as Richard Hobbes
- Phillip Johnson Richardson as "Tipsy" Detective Collins
- Kerry Flanagan as Larusso
- David Pittu as David/lawyer
- Quincy Dunn-Baker as William Tyler
- Hannah Dunne as Brenda
- Giullian Yao Gioiello as Jack

== Production ==
In March 2021, it was announced that A24 would produce the film for Apple TV+, directed by Benjamin Caron and starring Julianne Moore, based on a script written by Brian Gatewood and Alessandro Tanaka that was part of the 2020 The Black List of screenplays that will not be released in theaters during this calendar year. In July 2021, Sebastian Stan was added to the cast, with Justice Smith and Briana Middleton joining in August. In September, John Lithgow was cast, with filming beginning on September 13 in New York City.

== Release ==
Sharper was released in select theaters in the United States on February 10, 2023, by A24, and was released on Apple TV+ on February 17, 2023.

== Reception ==
On the review aggregator website Rotten Tomatoes, 69% of 142 critics' reviews are positive, with an average rating of 6.5/10. The website's consensus reads: "Although it never comes close to the classic capers it seeks to emulate, Sharper is just sleek and clever enough to pass the time." Metacritic, which uses a weighted average, assigned the film a score of 65 out of 100, based on 35 critics, indicating "generally favorable" reviews.
