= The Graves (film) =

- Promotional film poster
- Directed by: Brian Pulido
- Written by: Brian Pulido
- Produced by: Chris LaMont; Brian Ronalds; Dean Matthew Ronalds; Jess Acridge; Cindy Acridge
- Starring: Clare Grant; Jillian Murray; Randy Blythe; Bill Moseley; Tony Todd; Amanda Wyss
- Cinematography: Adam Goldfine
- Edited by: Dean Matthew Ronalds
- Music by: Jim Casella and The Mission Creeps
- Distributed by: After Dark Films
- Release date: October 31, 2009
- Running time: 88 minutes
- Country: United States
- Language: English

The Graves is a 2009 horror film. Described as a "supernatural survival shocker," it is written and directed by veteran comic book creator Brian Pulido and produced by Mischief Maker Studios, and Ronalds Brothers Productions.

== Plot ==
Present day. Arizona. Megan and Abby Graves are inseparable sisters who couldn't be less alike. Megan just graduated from ASU with a degree in marketing. She's a self-assured, naturally attractive rock chick with a black belt that she likes to use. Abby just barely graduated from high school. She's a cute, Hot Topic Goth who's caustic and afraid of her own shadow. They share one thing: a lifelong obsession with comics and pop culture. Simply put, they are beautiful geeks. In a few days, Megan will start a new job in New York. To send her off in style, the sisters go on a wild, pop culture bender that includes a trip to uncharted Arizona in search of a kitchy roadside attraction. Instead, Megan and Abby happen on Skull City Mine, a weather-beaten, abandoned mine town converted into a self-guided tour. But Skull City harbors terrible, vexing secrets. It appears to be haunted. Its caretakers are murderous. Victims' souls are ripped from their bodies right before their eyes, and that's only the beginning. When Megan suffers a near-mortal wound, Abby must save her sister, but to do so, she must unlock the mystery of Skull City alone. Can Abby defeat the threats of Skull City and rescue Megan, or are they doomed like all the other tourists before them?

== Cast ==
- Clare Grant as Megan Graves
- Jillian Murray as Abby Graves
- Randy Blythe as Luke
- Benjamin Glendenning as Comic Shop clerk
- Barbara Glover as Mama
- Bill Lippincott as Dad
- Rosalie Michaels as Mom
- Bill Moseley as Caleb
- Brian Pulido as M. Mischief
- Cathy Rankin as Valerie Mills
- Brian Ronalds as Pete
- Dean Matthew Ronalds as Eric
- Greg Seki as Gordy
- Shane Stevens as Jonah
- Patti Tindall as Becka Crane
- Tony Todd as Reverend Abraham
- Amanda Wyss as Darlene
- Calabrese as themselves

== Premise ==
The Graves is the debut film of independent comic book creator, Brian Pulido (Lady Death, Evil Ernie).

It features performances by genre vets Bill Moseley (The Devil's Rejects), Amanda Wyss (A Nightmare on Elm Street) and Tony Todd (Candyman), female leads, played by Clare Grant (Masters of Horror: "Valerie on the Stairs") and Jillian Murray (The Fun Park) and the debut of D. Randall Blythe (front man, Lamb of God).

== Production ==
The principal photography was shot on location in the Sonoran Desert near Wickenburg, Arizona over the course of 4 weeks and the project has entered post-production. The real-life Vulture City Mine and ghost town was used as the setting for the film.

== Release ==
The film ran at 8 Films to Die For IV and premiered there on January 29, 2010.
