= Locker 13 =

- Directed by: Bruce Dellis; Jason Marsden; Matthew Mebane; Adam Montierth; Donovan Montierth
- Written by: John Waldron; Jose Rosete; Bruce Dellis; Adam Montierth; Donovan Montierth; Jason Walters, and Cameron Young
- Produced by: Rick Schroder; Jose Rosete
- Starring: Krista Allen; Tatyana Ali
- Cinematography: Russell Carpenter
- Music by: Jasper Randall
- Production company: Brothers' Ink Productions
- Release dates: August 8, 2009 (Rhode Island Film Festival); March 28, 2014 (United States)
- Country: United States
- Language: English
- Box office: $2,468

Locker 13 (originally released as Locker 13: Down and Out) is a 2009 anthology thriller film directed by Bruce Dellis, Jason Marsden, Matthew Mebane, Adam Montierth, and Donovan Montierth. The story was written by John Waldron; the screenplay by Bruce Dellis, Jason Marsden, Donovan Montierth, Jose Rosete, Jason Walters, and Cameron Young. The film was produced by Danny Del Toro, Shawn Haught, Jason Marsden, Neil Mather, Maria White Mebane, Matthew Mebane, Jose Rosete, Rick Schroder, and Nick Stahr.

== Plot ==
Skip (Jason Spisak) works at an Old West theme park and is told several stories by his supervisor Archie (Jon Gries). Each story contains not only a strange locker with the number 13 on it, but also involves themes about making the right choices and the consequences of not doing so. The stories range from an aging boxer faced with a big choice to a young man desperate to take his own life.

== Cast ==
- Krista Allen as Patricia
- Tatyana Ali as Lucy
- Jason Marsden as Suicide Jack
- Jon Gries as Archie
- Rick Schroder as Tommy Novak
- Curtis Armstrong as Clifford
- Bart Johnson as Eugene MacClemore
- Jon Polito as Don Dillon
- Rick Hoffman as Armando
- Thomas Calabro as Harvey
- Carmen Perez as Marcia
- David Huddleston as Floyd
- Jesse Garcia as Ray
- Vanessa White as TV Personality #1 (voice)
- Steve Eastin as Doc Herman
- Jimmy Gambina as Jesse
- Jose Rosete as Jake
- Elizabeth Bond as TV Personality #2 (voice)
- Cathy Rankin as Lola
- Jason Spisak as Skip
- Victor Campos as Nate
- Amanda Melby as Erica
- Marina Benedict as Rachel
- Deonte Gordon as Boxer
- Bob Rue as Linus
- Steve Briscoe as Manfred
- John Schile as B.B.O.N.E.O. Member
- Maria White Mebane as News Anchor (voice)
- Ed Gary as Supporting
- Montgomery Maguire as Ring Announcer
- Herb Dean as Trainer
- Steven Motta as Billy "Thunderheart" Marco
- Michael Anthony Rosas as Cut Man / Corner Man
- Lamar Newmeyer as Grover
- Rory Pierce as Supporting
- Klor Rowland as Gavin

== Production ==
Plans to create Locker 13 began in 2007 after Waldron met Adam and Donovan Montierth of Brothers' Ink Productions at a film festival, where they started planning an anthology feature film. The trio sought other filmmakers to join the film by utilizing social media and writing websites, and raised funding via a successful Kickstarter campaign.

== Reception ==
Critical reception for Locker 13 has been predominantly negative. The film holds a rating of 13% on Rotten Tomatoes based on 8 reviews. On Metacritic it has a score of 22% based on 6 reviews.

Variety and The Hollywood Reporter both panned the film, and The Hollywood Reporter commented that "Despite a couple of mildly arresting vignettes, this philosophy-minded effort doesn’t offer enough genuine thrills to compensate for its pretensions." RogerEbert.com gave the movie 1 star and criticized it as being "amateurishly acted, illogically plotted, cruelly violent and needlessly sexist". In contrast, Fangoria gave the movie 2 1/2 out of 4 stars and stated that "Occasionally problematic, LOCKER 13 makes up for its weaknesses with good performances, intriguing stories and an unconventional approach to its segments." Twitch Film called the film "fine, light entertainment" but noted that it may not "stand out or linger long after viewing".

=== Awards ===
- Jury Award at the Atlanta Film Festival (2009, won)
