= Netherbeast Incorporated =

2007 American comedy horror film

- Directed by: Dean Ronalds
- Written by: Bruce Dellis
- Produced by: Brian Ronalds; Dean Ronalds; Chris LaMont; F. Miguel Valenti
- Starring: Darrell Hammond; Steve Burns; Dave Foley; Amy Davidson; Jason Mewes; Robert Wagner; Judd Nelson
- Cinematography: Stefan Von Bjorn
- Edited by: Dean Ronalds
- Music by: Tim Clark
- Production company: Ronalds Brothers Productions
- Release date: March 30, 2007 (AFI Dallas International Film Festival)
- Running time: 90 minutes
- Country: United States
- Language: English

Netherbeast Incorporated is a 2007 American comedy horror film directed by Dean Ronalds, written by Bruce Dellis, and starring Darrell Hammond and Steve Burns. It is an undead office comedy concerning a telephone company in the U.S. state of Arizona staffed entirely by flesh-eating, vampire-like employees who refer to themselves as "Netherfolk". Historical figures such as President James Garfield and Alexander Graham Bell are woven into the story. The film premiered at the 2007 AFI/Dallas Film Festival.

== Cast ==
- Steve Burns as Otto Granberry
- Darrell Hammond as Turner Claymore
- Robert Wagner as President James Garfield
- Dave Foley as Henry Welby
- Amy Davidson as Pearl Stricklett
- Judd Nelson as Steven P. D. Landry
- Jason Mewes as Waxy Dan
- Brian Ronalds as Dow Byrum
- Maiz Lucero as Emmitt Neely
- Robyn Allen as Rebecca Sibley
- Bob Rue as Bunyan Pritchett
- Jeremy Childs as Cecil Crenshaw
- Joshua Childs as Amos Crenshaw
- Bill Lippincott as Alexander Graham Bell
- Cathy Rankin as Jewel Hightower
- Bruce Nelson as Jeff Crouchman
- Laura Durant as Myrtie Van Hoover
- John Dobradenka as Mike Yarrow
- John Schile as Dr. Myron Berman
- Max Bullis as Elton
- Bruce Halperin as Monroe Overton
- Amanda Melby as Hazel Von Borscht
- Jennifer Pfalzgraff as Esther Thrillington
- Kevin Berman as Hamilton Veale

== See also ==
- Bloodsucking Bastards, a 2015 horror film with similar elements
