= Calabrese (band) =

American rock band

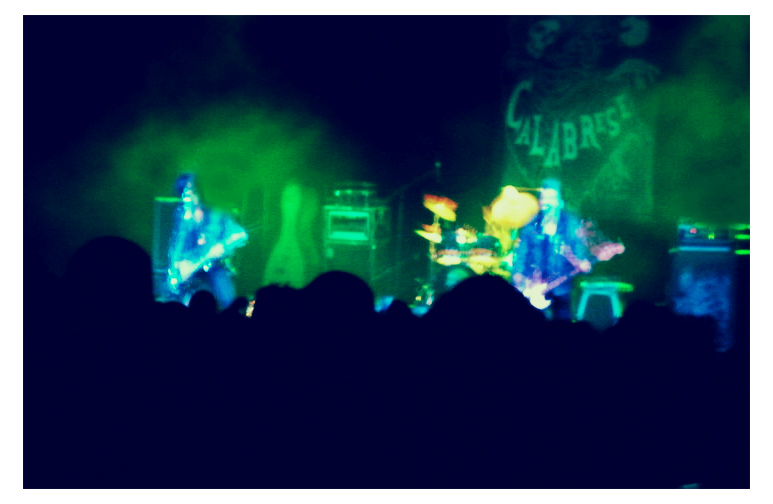
- Calabrese live in 2013

Background information
- Origin: Phoenix, Arizona, United States
- Genre: Gothic rock • punk rock • horror punk • alternative rock • hard rock
- Years active: 2003–present
- Label: Spookshow Records
- Members: Bobby Calabrese; Davey Calabrese; Argyle Goolsby
- Past members: Jimmy Calabrese
- Website: www.calabreserock.com

Calabrese is an American rock band that is based out of Phoenix, Arizona. The band originally consisted of three brothers; bassist/vocalist Jimmy Calabrese, guitarist/vocalist Bobby Calabrese and drummer Davey Calabrese. In 2022 Jimmy left the band and was subsequently replaced by Argyle Goolsby, best known as the frontman of Blitzkid. Calabrese has been described as "Melodic, hook-laden, catchy, fun, Rock with a Punk attitude”. They have cited other bands such as the Damned, Alkaline Trio, Black Flag, Black Sabbath, Turbonegro, the Misfits, the Hives, White Zombie/Rob Zombie, AFI, Danzig, Type O Negative, and the Ramones as influences.

== History ==
=== Origins ===
The three brothers were originally raised in the rural town of Antioch, Illinois in a large family of Italian American heritage. Jimmy Calabrese, the oldest of the trio, developed a fascination with horror and fictional monsters at an early age through a friend. Jimmy recalled in his blog how after the violent suicide of a local boy, paranormal activity was witnessed and investigated by him and a group of friends via the use of a ouija board. Afterward, their house was supposedly haunted, plagued by a foul smell, and had a demonic figure appear in a door. The hauntings reportedly stopped after the family moved to Arizona. Through Jimmy, Bobby was introduced to punk rock, metal and rock and roll music.

The two brothers both played bass and were separately active in a handful of local bands. In 2002, after completing film school at Columbia College, Jimmy decided the two should form their own band. Bobby switched to guitar and the two recruited the then fourteen-year-old Davey Calabrese, their youngest brother, to play drums.

On May 13, 2022 an announcement from Jimmy Calabrese stated he had left the band to retire. On 14 April 2024 the band announced that Argyle Goolsby was joining the band.

=== Midnight Spookshow ===
In 2003, the band self-released the EP, "Midnight Spookshow". The EP received positive reviews from underground and indie publications from around the world. Michigan-area artist Tony O'Farell was hired to do the artwork. Aaron Carey (pipelineaudio) recorded the "Midnight Spookshow" EP at Studio Z in Phoenix Arizona. The EP was mastered by Andrew Davenport at Edgeworth Studios, New Zealand, making this a truly international affair from the start.

=== 13 Halloweens ===
Though retaining their original punk rock sound, "13 Halloweens" displayed a foray into a more professional quality for the band that includes catchy melodies, AFI-like wails, heavier bass and drums. Canadian artist Andrew Barr was hired for the album's artwork. A music video for "Backseat of my Hearse" was directed by local filmmaker J.D. Smith. Subsequently, the band was approached by several indie labels, including an exclusive deal with Antidote Records. The band declined the offers and instead decided to again self-release their first full-length album through their recently created record label, Spookshow Records. For the title, the band held a contest to name their next album. The winning title was "13 Halloweens," sent in by Tempe fan Kurt Havelock under the name Nil Failstorm.

=== The Traveling Vampire Show ===
One year later the band released their second full-length album, The Traveling Vampire Show. The album features the artwork of Tom Bagley (of the Canadian rock band, The Forbidden Dimension) and Andrew Barr. The Traveling Vampire Show continued the sound of 13 Halloweens in many ways and explored in more detail the topics of the paranormal, vampirism, and the occult.

The music videos Voices of the Dead and Vampires Don't Exist were directed by famed comic book writer and film director Brian Pulido. Voices of the Dead was shot at Collins College Studio in Tempe, AZ and premiered on March 1, 2007 at Chandler Cinemas after a live performance by the band. The video for Vampires Don't Exist was used to promote Pulido's latest movie, The Graves which aired on the SyFy channel.

=== They Call Us Death ===
On "They Call Us Death," Calabrese's metal and punk rock roots shine bright. With faster tempos and harder vocals, Calabrese continues to grow as songwriters. "They Call Us Death" is harder, heavier and darker than their previous albums. The Calabrese brothers have developed a much more mature style with this album. Bobby Calabrese has stated that the band was influenced by The Dead Boys, The Stooges, The Damned, The Cult and Motörhead a lot on this album. The album was released March 20, 2010 on Spookshow Records.

=== Dayglo Necros ===
On 1 July 2012, Calabrese would release Dayglo Necros, continuing their development of their horror punk sound. While failing to make any charts, critics praised the album for continuing to refine the styles established in previous works. For the title, the band held a contest to name this album. The winning title was sent in by Eric Blair from the horror-punk band, Mummula, inspired by the vibrant colors of the album art.

=== Born With a Scorpion's Touch ===
Calabrese would later release Born With a Scorpion's Touch, the band's fifth album. The album was popular among critics and fans, with some acknowledging references and inspiration from one of the band's previous works, 13 Halloweens. Born With A Scorpion's Touch was released October 1, 2013.

=== Lust For Sacrilege ===
Lust For Sacrilege is Calabrese’s sixth full-length album, released under Spookshow Records. The release was popular among fans and critics, who praised it for taking more influence from the band's roots of punk and metal. The album was also noted for its nods to some of the band's inspirations, such as Danzig, Black Sabbath, and Mastodon. Lust For Sacrilege was released on January 12, 2015.

== Discography ==
- Midnight Spookshow EP (2003)
- 13 Halloweens (2005)
- The Traveling Vampire Show (2007)
- Calabrese III: They Call Us Death (2010)
- Dayglo Necros (2012)
- Born with a Scorpion's Touch (2013)
- Lust for Sacrilege (2015)
- Flee the Light (2019)
- Death Cult EP (2022)
- No Return From Darkness EP (2025)

== Music compilations ==
- Hellnight-O-Rama 2
- HorrorPunk Compilation Volume 2: The Resurrection
- P.A.I.N. Soundtrack Vol. 1
- Too Much Horror Business 1977-1983: A Tribute to the Misfits 1977-1983 - "Night of the Living Dead"
- AZPunk.Comp V2 (2003)
- AZPunk.Comp V3 (2004)
- Horror of it All Vol. 1 (2005)
- This Is HorrorPunk Vol. 2 (2005)
- Ghouls Gone Wild (2006)
- Horror of it All Vol. 2 (2006)
- The Morgue The Merrier (2006)
- Rebels Of Rock N Roll No. 1 (2008)
- Horror High Presents Prom Queen Massacre (2006)

== Movie soundtracks ==
- Horror Film: The Movie
- Zombie Punks from Beyond the Grave
- Prison-A-Go-Go! (2003)
- Chainsaw Sally (2004)
- Hoodoo for Voodoo (2006)
- No. My Other Possessed-Zombie Girlfriend. (2006)
- Blood on the Highway (2008)
- Cabras (2009-Unreleased)
- The Graves (As Seen on the SyFy Channel)(2010)
- No. My Other Possessed-Zombie Girlfriend
- Hack Job
