= Harrison Xu =

Canadian-American actor

- Education: University of Southern California
- Occupations: Actor, writer, director, digital marketer
- Years active: 2010–present

Harrison Xu is a Canadian-American actor, film director, screenwriter, and digital marketer. He is based in Vancouver.

== Early life and education ==
Xu was raised in Fremont, California, and then Vancouver, Canada. He attended the University of Southern California, graduating in 2015.

== Career ==
Xu portrayed Josh in the 2021 film Born a Champion, starring Sean Patrick Flannery. He starred in the title role in the 2023 film Last Summer of Nathan Lee, directed by Quentin Lee.

Xu co-wrote, co-directed, produced and stars in the 2024 meta stoner comedy Extremely Unique Dynamic. He wrote it with his co-star Ivan Leung, and directed it alongside Leung and Katherine Dudas. Production on the film began in February 2023, it premiered at the Sonoma International Film Festival in March 2024, and was distributed by Strand Releasing, with a US release on January 10, 2025. Xu and Leung produced the film through their Heroic Impact production company. Like his character in the film, Xu also works in film marketing. He and Leung are longtime friends, and first worked together on the marketing campaign for the 2023 film Winnie-the-Pooh: Blood and Honey.

Xu's television credits include Shameless, Grey's Anatomy, 9-1-1, Young Sheldon, and American Horror Stories. He is set to appear in the Paramount+ series Happy Face alongside Annaleigh Ashford and Dennis Quaid. In 2019, he began working as a voice actor, and has since had lead and supporting voice roles for series including Squid Game, All of Us Are Dead, Extracurricular, Sweet Home, The Glory, Gyeongseong Creature, Extraordinary Attorney Woo, and 20th Century Girl.

== Personal life ==
In 2023, Xu moved from Los Angeles to Vancouver.

== Filmography ==
=== Film ===
| Year | Title | Role | Notes |
|---|---|---|---|
| 2016 | 8989 Redstone | Rama | |
| 2021 | Comisery | Kel Lee | |
| 2021 | Born a Champion | Josh | |
| 2022 | The First Slam Dunk | Satoru Sasaoka (voice) | |
| 2023 | Last Summer of Nathan Lee | Nathan Lee | Also producer |
| 2024 | Garthwaite: A Film by Ben Kurns | Jethroe Downes | |
| 2024 | Extremely Unique Dynamic | Ryan | Also director, writer, producer |
| TBA | Near Death | Harry | |

=== Television ===
| Year | Title | Role | Notes |
|---|---|---|---|
| 2010 | Eureka | Tesla Kid | Season 4 (1 episode) |
| 2011 | V | Chinese Boy | Season 2 (1 episode) |
| 2012 | Up All Night | Danny | Season 1 (1 episode) |
| 2013 | Shameless | Ralph Wong | Season 3 (1 episode) |
| 2013 | Pretty Little Liars | Kevin | Season 4 (1 episode) |
| 2020-24 | Sweet Home | Eun-hyeok Lee (voice) | Seasons 1-3 (23 episodes) |
| 2021 | Grey's Anatomy | Gerard | Season 18 (1 episode) |
| 2021 | American Horror Stories | William | Season 1 (2 episodes) |
| 2021 | Hometown Cha-Cha-Cha | Choi Geum Cheol (voice) | Season 1 (16 episodes) |
| 2022 | Warped! | Chuck | Season 1 (2 episodes) |
| 2022 | Sistas | Riley | Season 4 (1 episode) |
| 2022 | 9-1-1 | Hiro | Season 6 (1 episode) |
| 2022 | All Of Us Are Dead | Cheong-San (voice) | Season 1 (12 episodes) |
| 2022 | Lookism | Additional Voices | Season 1 (7 episodes) |
| 2023 | Young Sheldon | Paul | Season 6 (1 episode) |
| 2023 | The Glory | Joo Yeo-jeong (voice) | Season 1 (16 episodes) |
| 2023 | Abominable and the Invisible City | Additional Voices | Seasons 1-2 (4 episodes) |
| 2024 | Squid Game | Park Gyeong-seok (voice) | Season 2 (7 episodes) |
| 2025 | Happy Face | Stewart | 2 episodes |
| 2025 | Animal Control | Marty | Season 3 (1 episode) |
