= Amanda Melby =

American actress and film producer

- Born: St. Cloud, MN, United States, North America
- Occupation(s): Actress and Film Producer
- Years active: 1999–present
- Spouse: David Crisalli

Amanda Melby is an American actress and film producer. She is the host of the Emmy-winning series Screen Wars, and the star and producer of the film Raising Buchanan.

== Career ==
After graduation from Concordia College in Moorhead, MN, Melby began her acting career with stops in Los Angeles, San Diego, Cleveland, and Washington, DC, working in commercials, theatre, studio films (The Majestic), independent films (Locker 13, Jake's Corner, Netherbeast Incorporated, Madison Hall), and television (Candid Camera, S.I.S., Boston Public, Young & the Restless).

Settling in Arizona, Melby served as the Executive Director of the Phoenix chapter of Independent Feature Project (IFP/PHX) from 2005-2011, building a network for Arizona’s independent filmmakers. From 2006- 2012, she was a board member of the Phoenix Film Foundation and the Arizona Film and Media Coalition (AFMC). She was the Secretary of the SAG-AFTRA Arizona-Utah Board, having served on the separate unions’ boards prior to the merger from 2005-2013.

In 2005, Melby was one of the creators of Screen Wars, an Arizona-based television series showcasing independent film. She hosted and produced 69 episodes over two seasons. The series was nominated for 13 Rocky Mountain Emmy Awards, winning four. Melby was personally nominated for three of these Emmys (for hosting and producing).

Melby was honored with the 2007 Phoenix Film Foundation Board Member of the Year, and with the 2008 Layne Award presented by the Arizona Entertainment Alliance. She was also nominated for the 2011 Arizona Governor’s Arts Award for her contributions to the Arizona Entertainment Community.

In 2019, Melby produced and starred in Raising Buchanan, a feature film co-starring René Auberjonois, M. Emmet Walsh, Cathy Shim, Terence Bernie Hines, and Robert Ben Garant. Melby garnered accolades and awards (for her role as producer and her lead performance) from a variety of film festivals in the United States and abroad.

== Selected filmography ==
=== Actress ===
Year	Title	Role
1999	The Language of Kickball	Taylor
2001	The Majestic	Young Mrs. Trimble
2005-07	Screen Wars (TV series)	Host/various characters
2007	The Hoax	Expectant Mother
2007	Netherbeast Incorporated	Hazel Von Borscht
2007	Farewell Darkness	Denise Franks
2008	Jake's Corner	Kari
2008	S.I.S.	Dorri
2009	Cocktail Wizard	Merlina the Doctor
2009	Madison Hall	Dispatch
2010	Small Happys	Lisa
2010	The Darkness of Light	Daphne Sinclaire
2011	Cult Status	Marly
2012	Impotent	Debra Peterson
2014	Candid Camera (TV series)	Self/Guest Star
2014	Locker 13	Erica
2015	Ouroboros	Dr. Faye O’Niell
2019	Raising Buchanan	Ruth Kiesling

=== Producer ===
Year	Title
2005-07	Screen Wars (TV series)
2007	Farewell Darkness
2009	The Prank
2010	License to Lie
2011	The Dream Role
2012	The Science of Friendship
2012	Path to the Presidency
2012	Got Talent?
2013	Surprise for Goldwater Middle
2014	The League of Anti Smokers
2014	Slam Dunk
2014	Gear Heads Unite
2015	Ditch Day
2017	The Dance
2019	Raising Buchanan

== Personal life ==
Melby is a faculty associate at Arizona State University teaching screen acting and is the head coach and owner of Verve Studios, a professional actor-training studio in Scottsdale, Arizona. She is married with two children.
