= Molly Millions =

Fictional character in works by William Gibson

Molly Millions as depicted on the Brazilian cover of Neuromancer.

Molly Millions (also known as Sally Shears, Rose Kolodny, and others) is a recurring character in stories and novels written by William Gibson, particularly his Sprawl trilogy. She first appeared in "Johnny Mnemonic", to which she makes an oblique reference in Neuromancer (where she is referred to as "Molly" with no last name given). She later appeared in Mona Lisa Overdrive under the name "Sally Shears".

== Character history ==
In all three stories, Molly is a physically tough (but not instantly imposing) bodyguard/mercenary cyborg. She is referred to as a "razorgirl" or "street samurai" throughout his stories and also as "Steppin' Razor" by the residents of Zion, a Rastafarian enclave aboard a space station.

A useful contact for dealing with gangs and black market elements, she tends to show little remorse for the opponents she ruthlessly dispatches in the course of her objectives. In fact she shows few deep emotions towards anyone outside of hatred, suspicion or amused contempt. Nevertheless, Molly is always regarded throughout the book as a loyal, morally strong character, opposed to the progressing decay of human relations in the world Gibson depicts.

An exception to her cold, somewhat cynical approach to life was her relationship with Johnny (of "Johnny Mnemonic"), for whom she still mourned at the time of Neuromancer. This is part of the personal history she relates to its protagonist, Case, in addition to the revelation that she worked as a "meat puppet" (a prostitute) in a "puppet parlor" (a brothel where people lend out their bodies while maintained in a blanked-out state) to pay for her considerable cybernetic enhancements.

Another pseudonym, used when she rents a hotel room in Neuromancer, is "Rose Kolodny", the name by which the Turing Police refer to her. The Turing Police may have simply gotten the name from the hotel's registry, but it is sometimes speculated to be her original name. The later trilogy books speculate that she is "SINless", having been an unrecorded birth and never having been issued a "Single Identity Number". This would give her the advantage of being more difficult to track in the cyberspace environment. Critic Larry McCaffery asserts that the name "Molly" is a reference to her status as a gun moll.

William Gibson has stated that he derived inspiration for the character from the image of Chrissie Hynde on the cover of the first Pretenders album.

== Augmentations ==
Molly's metabolism, sensory input, and reflexes are artificially heightened by means of electronic implants and other advanced medical procedures. She has razor-sharp retractable blades underneath her fingernails, each double-edged and four centimeters in length. Appearing at first glance to be wearing mirrored sunglasses, Molly has in fact had her eye sockets sealed with vision-enhancing mirrored lenses, installed by the skilled black-market surgeons of Chiba City. To accommodate the inset lenses her tear ducts have been re-routed to her mouth; on the very rare occasions she cries, she either spits out or swallows the tears. She never lets others touch the lenses as it would leave messy fingerprints requiring extra cleaning.

== Portrayal in other media ==
The 1995 film version of Johnny Mnemonic replaced Molly with a character named Jane (played by Dina Meyer) who did not have modifications to her eyes or to her fingers. Jane did share the modified nervous system but used a single razor attached to the tip of a flexible spring rod as a weapon.

In the 2003 BBC Radio adaptation of Neuromancer, Molly was played by the English actress Nicola Walker. Sasha Grey took on the role in Case, a six-hour dramatic contemporary adaptation of the novel staged in New York City in November 2009.

Briana Middleton has been cast as Molly in the upcoming adaptation for Apple TV+.

== Literary analysis ==
The character has been described as one of Gibson's most complex characters.

== References in pop culture ==
Molly is the subject of a song called "Mirrorshades" by the group Information Society.
