= The Tender Bar (film) =

2021 film by George Clooney

- Official release poster
- Directed by: George Clooney
- Screenplay by: William Monahan
- Based on: The Tender Bar by J. R. Moehringer
- Produced by: George Clooney; Grant Heslov; Ted Hope
- Starring: Ben Affleck; Tye Sheridan; Lily Rabe; Christopher Lloyd; Daniel Ranieri
- Narrated by: Ron Livingston
- Cinematography: Martin Ruhe
- Edited by: Tanya M. Swerling
- Music by: Dara Taylor
- Production companies: Amazon Studios; Smokehouse Pictures; Grand Illusion Films
- Distributed by: Amazon Studios
- Release dates: October 10, 2021 (BFI); December 17, 2021 (United States)
- Running time: 104 minutes
- Country: United States
- Language: English

The Tender Bar is a 2021 American coming-of-age drama film directed by George Clooney and written by William Monahan. Based on J. R. Moehringer's 2005 memoir, it recounts Moehringer's life growing up on Long Island. It stars Ben Affleck, Tye Sheridan, Daniel Ranieri, Lily Rabe, and Christopher Lloyd. It was the final film appearance of Sondra James before her death in September 2021.

The film premiered at the BFI London Film Festival on October 10, 2021. It received a limited release on December 17, 2021, by Amazon Studios; then was widely released on December 22, prior to its streaming debut on Prime Video on January 7, 2022. It received mixed reviews, though Affleck was nominated for the Golden Globe and Screen Actors Guild Awards for his performance.

== Plot ==
In 1973, nine-year-old JR Maguire and his mother Dorothy move back in with her parents on Long Island. Abandoned by his deadbeat father Johnny, a radio DJ known as "the Voice", JR grows up with his mother's working-class family. He finds a surrogate father in his uncle Charlie, the owner of a local bar, "The Dickens".

JR often listens to the Voice on the radio, and Johnny calls with plans to take him to a baseball game, but fails to show up and later flees the state. Imparting life lessons to JR, Charlie shares his love of reading and encourages him to become a writer, while Dorothy is determined that her son will have the college education she never had. Though her own well-educated father never made anything of his life, she insists that JR will one day attend Harvard or Yale and become a lawyer.

Johnny makes a brief visit, beating up Charlie when he heckles him for his absence in JR's life. Confronting a school psychologist for exploiting JR to hit on Dorothy, Charlie is impressed by his nephew's writing. JR's grandfather accompanies him to a father-and-son breakfast, and explains that Dorothy is having her cancerous thyroid removed. She recovers, and JR's knack for word puzzles earns him a spot in Charlie and his friends' bowling league.

As a teenager, JR has an interview at Yale and meets a priest on the train to New Haven. He is admitted to the university, to his family's delight, and later brings his roommates home to meet Charlie, having their first of-age drinks at The Dickens. JR strikes up a romance with his classmate Sidney, who brings him home to Westport, Connecticut. After sneaking him up to her room for the night, she reveals that she is seeing someone else, leading to an uncomfortable breakfast with her "lower-upper-middle class" parents before he departs.

Continuing his studies, JR encounters the same priest on the train, and is unsuccessful in winning Sidney back. Graduating in 1986, he receives one of his father's sporadic phone calls. JR presents his mother with a class ring, but disappoints her by eschewing law school and moving home to work on his novel. Ignoring his friend Wesley's advice, he continues to pursue Sidney with guidance from Charlie, and is hired as a trainee at The New York Times.

Learning that Sidney has married her college boyfriend, JR is let go from the Times. Charlie is briefly hospitalized, and encourages JR to incorporate his recent setbacks into his novel. On Charlie's advice, JR finds his father in North Carolina, but realizes that he remains an abusive alcoholic. Johnny assaults his girlfriend and JR has him arrested, finally standing up to his father.

Returning home, where his mother has found a new job, JR moves to Manhattan, but not before Charlie gives him his car. Charlie and his drinking buddies see his nephew off, and JR is determined to prove himself as a writer. During the credits, young JR spends a day at the beach with Charlie and his friends.

== Cast ==
- Ben Affleck as Charlie Maguire
- Tye Sheridan as JR Maguire
- Daniel Ranieri as young JR
- Ron Livingston as future JR / the narrator
- Lily Rabe as Dorothy Maguire
- Christopher Lloyd as Grandpa Maguire
- Max Martini as "The Voice"; Johnny Michaels, JR's father
- Sondra James as Grandma Maguire
- Michael Braun as Bobo
- Matthew Delamater as Joey D
- Max Casella as Chief
- Rhenzy Feliz as Wesley
- Ivan Leung as Jimmy
- Briana Middleton as Sidney

== Production ==
The project initially began development in 2013 at Sony Pictures and Chernin Entertainment, with Ted Melfi set as writer and director. Upon his exit, Sony placed the project into turnaround, with Amazon Studios picking up the rights in July 2020. George Clooney entered negotiations to direct the film from a screenplay by William Monahan. Clooney was also attached to produce the film alongside his Smokehouse Pictures producing partner Grant Heslov. Ted Hope was also announced as a producer under his first-look deal at Amazon Studios.

Clooney was confirmed as director in December 2020, with Ben Affleck entering negotiations to star. Affleck's role was confirmed in February 2021, along with the casting of Tye Sheridan and Lily Rabe as the leads. In March 2021, Christopher Lloyd, Sondra James, Max Martini, Michael Braun, Matthew Delamater, Max Casella, Rhenzy Feliz, Ivan Leung, Briana Middleton, and Daniel Ranieri joined the cast.

Working around COVID-19 pandemic restrictions, principal photography began on February 22, 2021, at various locations in Eastern Massachusetts, and concluded on April 14, 2021. Filming sites included the Belvidere neighborhood of Lowell; Downtown Beverly, Massachusetts; the Granite Park neighborhood of Braintree; and a vacant restaurant building at South Shore Plaza, also in Braintree. Lesley University's Brattle Street campus in Cambridge served as a stand-in for the Yale campus in New Haven.

== Release ==
The Tender Bar had its world premiere at the 65th BFI London Film Festival on October 10, 2021. It had a limited theatrical release on December 17, 2021, prior to streaming on Prime Video on January 7, 2022.

== Reception ==
=== Critical response ===
On the review aggregator website Rotten Tomatoes, 51% of 186 critics' reviews are positive, with an average rating of 5.6/10. The website's consensus reads: "It's well-acted and suffused with a warm nostalgic glow, but none of that is enough to overcome The Tender Bar's sleepy, sentimental noodling." Metacritic, which uses a weighted average, assigned the film a score of 53 out of 100, based on 40 critics, indicating "mixed or average" reviews.

A. O. Scott of The New York Times wrote: "It’s not the kind of movie that will knock you out, but it won’t leave you with a headache and a dry mouth, either. It’s a generous pour and a mellow buzz." Sheri Linden of The Hollywood Reporter wrote: "If it struggles to find a rhythm, especially in the early going, there’s no question that it sends you off on a gentle high."

=== Accolades ===
| Year | Award | Category | Recipient | Result | Ref. |
|---|---|---|---|---|---|
| 2021 | St. Louis Gateway Film Critics Association Awards | Best Soundtrack | The Tender Bar | Nominated | |
| 2021 | Dallas–Fort Worth Film Critics Association Awards | Best Supporting Actor | Ben Affleck | Nominated | |
| 2022 | Golden Globe Awards | Best Supporting Actor – Motion Picture | Ben Affleck | Nominated | |
| 2022 | Screen Actors Guild Awards | Outstanding Performance by a Male Actor in a Supporting Role | Ben Affleck | Nominated | |
