= Charlie Weber (actor) =

American actor and former model (born 1978)

- Born: Charles Alan Weber Jr. September 20, 1978 (age 47); Jefferson City, Missouri, U.S.
- Occupation: Actor
- Years active: 2000–present
- Spouse: Giselle Weber (m. 2015; div. 2016)
- Children: 1

Charles Alan Weber Jr. (born September 20, 1978) is an American actor and former model. In 2014, Weber began starring as Frank Delfino in the ABC legal drama series, How to Get Away with Murder.

== Early life ==
Weber was born in Jefferson City, Missouri. He dropped out of college after a year and moved to New York City when he was 19 years old to study at the Stella Adler Studio of Acting. As a model, Weber appeared in the Christmas 1998 Abercrombie & Fitch catalog when photographer Bruce Weber revitalized the publication.

== Career ==
Weber made his screen debut in the 2000 film The Broken Hearts Club: A Romantic Comedy. Later that same year, he was cast in the recurring role of Ben on the TV series Buffy the Vampire Slayer. Weber appeared in 14 episodes of the series from 2000 to 2001. He later guest-starred on The Drew Carey Show, Charmed, Veronica Mars, House, Burn Notice, Bones, Warehouse 13 and CSI: Crime Scene Investigation.

From 2003 to 2004, Weber had roles in the direct-to-video films Gacy, The Kiss and Cruel Intentions 3. In 2010, he co-starred in the vampire-spoof film Vampires Suck. From 2003 to 2004 he had a recurring role of Jay in another The WB drama series, Everwood. From 2012 to 2013 he appeared in the MTV comedy-drama series, Underemployed, and later had a recurring role on the fifth season of The CW teen drama, 90210.

In 2014, Weber was cast in the series regular role in the ABC legal drama series, How to Get Away with Murder produced by Shonda Rhimes. He played the role of Frank Delfino, an associate of Viola Davis' character.

Weber played Christian Vance, owner of Vance Publishing, in the 2020 romance film sequel After We Collided.

== Filmography ==
Film roles
Year	Title	Role	Notes
2000	The Broken Hearts Club: A Romantic Comedy	Newbie	
2002	Dead Above Ground	Dillon Johnson	
2003	Gacy	Tom Kovacs	Direct-to-video film
2003	The Kiss	Zig	Direct-to-video film
2004	Cruel Intentions 3	Brett Patterson	Direct-to-video film
2010	Vampires Suck	Jack	
2016	Jarhead 3: The Siege	Evan Albright	Direct-to-video film
2017	Ex-Patriot	Bill Donovan	
2019	Coyote Lake	Mario	
2020	After We Collided	Christian Vance	
2020	DC Showcase: Adam Strange	Adam Strange	Short film
2022	Panama	Hank Burns	
2022	As They Made Us	Peter	
2023	The Locksmith	Garrett Field	
2023	Soul Mates	Jason	
2024	The Painter	Peter	

Television and video game roles
Year	Title	Role	Notes
2000	The Drew Carey Show	Brad	Episode: "Drew Pops Something on Kate"
2000–2001	Buffy the Vampire Slayer	Ben Wilkinson	Recurring role, 14 episodes
2001	Charmed	The Prince	Episode: "A Knight to Remember"
2003–2004	Everwood	Jay	Recurring role, 5 episodes
2006	CSI: NY	Damon	Episode: "Heroes"
2006	Veronica Mars	Glen	Episode: "Of Vice and Men"
2007	CSI: Miami	Lou Pennington	Episode: "Throwing Heat"
2007	CSI: Crime Scene Investigation	Corey Archfield	Episode: "Empty Eyes"
2008	Dirt	Ian	Episode: "Dirty, Slutty Whores"
2009	Reaper	Xavier	Episode: "To Sprong, with Love"
2010	House	Damien	Episode: "Open and Shut"
2011	Burn Notice	Jacob Starky	2 episodes
2011	State of Georgia	Jeb	2 episodes
2011	Bones	Nolan	Episode: "The Twist in the Twister"
2012	Femme Fatales	Ace	Episode: "Jail Break"
2012–2013	Underemployed	Todd	Recurring role, 12 episodes
2013	90210	Mark Holland	Recurring role, 7 episodes
2013	Warehouse 13	Liam Napier	Episode: "Runaway"
2013	Battlefield 4	Staff Sergeant Dunn	Video game; voice role
2014–2020	How to Get Away with Murder	Frank Delfino	Main role
2022	Christmas Bedtime Stories	Major Colby Aames	Television film
2023–2025	Mystery Island movie series	Jason Trent	Hallmark mystery
