= The Locksmith (film) =

2023 film directed by Nicolas Harvard

- Film release poster
- Directed by: Nicolas Harvard
- Screenplay by: John Glosser; Joe Russo; Chris LaMont
- Story by: Blair Kroeber
- Produced by: Roger Goff; Mark B. David
- Starring: Ryan Phillippe; Kate Bosworth; Ving Rhames
- Cinematography: Jeff Bierman
- Edited by: Loria Ball
- Music by: Marlana Sheetz
- Production companies: Chicken Soup for the Soul Entertainment; Arclight Films
- Distributed by: Screen Media
- Release date: February 3, 2023
- Running time: 91 minutes
- Country: United States
- Language: English

The Locksmith is a 2023 American thriller film directed by Nicolas Harvard in his feature directorial debut. John Glosser, Joe Russo, Chris LaMont, and Ben Kabialis wrote the screenplay based on an original story by Blair Kroeber.

== Plot ==
Miller Graham is a locksmith fresh out of prison after a job gone wrong. Back home, he tries to reintegrate into social life and with his daughter and his ex-girlfriend, Beth, who is now a detective. However, things quickly become complicated after an unexpected kidnapping. He finds himself drawn into a world of corrupt police officers and criminals.

== Cast ==
- Ryan Phillippe as Miller Graham
- Kate Bosworth as Beth Fisher
- Charlie Weber as Garrett Field
- Gabriela Quezada as April Reyes
- Kaylee Bryant as Tanya Saunders
- Madeleine Guilbot as Lindsay
- Jeffrey Nordling as Ian Zwick
- Ving Rhames as Frank
- Bourke Floyd as Detective Jones
- Noel Gugliemi as Detective Perez
- George Akram as Kevin Reyes
- Livia Treviño as Sharon
- Tom Wright as Chief Stern
- Emily Rose David as Rose

== Production ==
At the 2021 American Film Market, The Locksmith was revealed to be in development and seeking distribution. The original story was created by Blair Kroeber before John Glosser, Joe Russo & Chris LaMont, and Ben Kabialis developed the screenplay. The film is Nicolas Harvard's feature directorial debut. When preparing to go into production, it was announced that the film would be using rubber guns when filming after the tragic Rust shooting incident, and CGI effects would be added in post-production.

When the film was announced, Ryan Phillippe, Kate Bosworth, and Ving Rhames were cast. Filming began on November 15, 2021, in Las Cruces, New Mexico. During production additional casting announcements added Charlie Weber, Jeffrey Nordling, Kaylee Bryant. Filming was completed in February 2022.

== Release ==
The Locksmith was released theatrically by Screen Media on February 3, 2023, and on video on demand.

== Reception ==
On the review aggregator website Rotten Tomatoes, 33% of 18 critics' reviews are positive, with an average rating of 5/10. Metacritic, which uses a weighted average, assigned the film a score of 42 out of 100, based on five critics, indicating "mixed or average" reviews.
