= The Inheritance (2024 American film) =

Film by Alejandro Brugués

- Release poster
- Directed by: Alejandro Brugués
- Written by: Chris LaMont; Joe Russo
- Produced by: Paul Schiff
- Starring: Bob Gunton; Peyton List; Briana Middleton; Rachel Nichols; Austin Stowell; David Walton
- Cinematography: Vincent De Paula
- Edited by: Steve Mirkovich; Halima K. Gilliam
- Music by: Mondo Boys
- Production company: Paul Schiff Productions
- Distributed by: Vertical
- Release date: July 12, 2024
- Running time: 96 minutes
- Country: United States
- Language: English

The Inheritance is a 2024 American horror film directed by Alejandro Brugués. It stars Bob Gunton, Peyton List, Briana Middleton, Rachel Nichols, Austin Stowell and David Walton.

== Plot ==
Billionaire Charles Abernathy invites his estranged adult children—twins C.J. and Madeline, Drew and his wife Hannah, and Kami—home for his birthday. Head of security Miles leads them to their father, who reveals he will be killed at midnight, instructing his security detail to leave him alone. He asks his children to protect him, promising equal inheritance if they succeed. He has enhanced the estate with advanced security systems and sealed doors to prepare. Charles tells Hannah to leave, but she refuses.

While the children and Hannah stay that night, Kami wanders into the cellar but gets scared by a strange growl and leaves. Before she can swim in the indoor pool, she is killed by an unseen attacker. Meanwhile, Madeline and C.J. scheme to take Charles' wealth without the other children until Drew and Hannah inform them Kami is missing. They find her body and tell Charles. Despite feeling sympathy, Charles refuses to open the doors, revealing the killer is a demon he dealt with years ago, now coming to collect a debt. After Kami's death, Charles changes the will, ensuring Hannah receives Kami's wealth as she remained.

Tensions rise among his children when the twins accuse Drew and Hannah of targeting Kami to claim the wealth. However, the conflict subsides once they discover Kami's body missing from the pool. Hannah wants to leave the estate and attempts to break the glass unsuccessfully. Drew suggests using an elevator instead of the main entrance in the antique room. They enter the antique room, but Hannah cannot squeeze through the elevator gates due to an unseen force. Spotting a demon, Hannah and Drew flee upstairs.

After escaping, the twins lock Drew and Hannah in a vault, planning to kill them and take over the estate. The demon drags Madeline into another room, taking the form of Kami. C.J. bursts in and accidentally shoots Madeline, killing her. He then frees Drew and Hannah to confront his father, while the demon turns off all the power in the house. Drew and Hannah flee to a bedroom, discovering a hidden door to an occult summoning ritual. Meanwhile, the demon kills C.J.

Drew and Hannah come into Charles' room to confront the patriarch. Charles reveals that the Abernathy family was becoming impoverished after multiple financial failures and schemes, so he summoned Mammon, the demon of greed. Charles made a deal with the demon to have riches in exchange for his soul on his 75th birthday; however, not wanting to lose all he has gained from the deal, Charles proposes to Mammon a new bargain: instead of his soul, he offers his bloodline as a sacrifice to the demon. Charles shoots Drew, killing him, and attempts to kill Hannah to prevent her from exposing the bargain. Hannah runs back and picks up a rifle. As Charles searches for Hannah, he is shot by her, wounding him just as midnight passes.

Hannah reveals that she and Drew had come to the estate to tell him she is pregnant with Drew's baby, which means that the deal with Mammon remains in contract. Because the deal was for Charles to be protected until midnight had passed, Mammon appears and claims Charles's soul. By the next morning, the doors unlock themselves, and Hannah leaves the estate.

== Cast ==
- Bob Gunton as Charles Abernathy, the billionaire patriarch of the Abernathy family
- Peyton List as Kami, Charles' youngest daughter and a social media influencer
- Briana Middleton as Hannah, Drew's wife who helps run the charitable arm of the Abernathy empire
- Rachel Nichols as Madeline, Charles' eldest daughter and twin sister of C.J. who runs the entertainment arm of the Abernathy empire
- Austin Stowell as Drew, Charles' youngest son and Hannah's husband who runs the charitable arm of the Abernathy empire
- David Walton as C.J., Charles' eldest son and twin brother of Madeline who runs the news and information holdings in the Abernathy empire
- Reese Alexander as Miles Hartmen, Charles' longtime friend and attorney

== Production ==
In April 2021, it was announced Netflix had set Alejandro Brugués to direct the film under its original title, The Last Will and Testament of Charles Abernathy, from a script by Chris LaMont and Joe Russo which had previously appeared on the 2018 Blood List of best unproduced horror screenplays. In May of that year, Rachel Nichols, Bob Gunton, Austin Stowell, Briana Middleton, David Walton, Reese Alexander, and Peyton List had signed on for the film's cast.

== Release ==
Initially intended for release on Netflix's streaming service, the company announced in January 2023 it would no longer be distributing The Inheritance allowing the producers to shop the film elsewhere for alternate distributors. In June 2024, it was announced Vertical had acquired distribution rights for the film and would release the film in a limited theatrical run and on video-on-demand (VOD) on July 12, 2024.

== Reception ==
On the review aggregator website Rotten Tomatoes, 38% of 16 critics' reviews are positive, with an average rating of 5/10.
