= Briana Middleton =

American actress

- Middleton in 2020
- Born: U.S.
- Occupation: Actress
- Years active: 2014–present

Briana Middleton is an American actress, singer and songwriter.

== Early life ==
Middleton is an alumna of The Ensworth School. She studied drama at Carnegie Mellon University and the University of North Carolina School of the Arts.

== Career ==
Middleton's acting career began ramping up in 2021, when she was cast in George Clooney's drama The Tender Bar, The Inheritance, and Sharper co-starring Julianne Moore.

However, her casting in a lead role in the Disney+ series Little Town, prequel to the 2017 Beauty and the Beast adaptation, ended with the series being delayed indefinitely in February 2022. And in June 2023, another show she was cast to star in, Metropolis, a miniseries adaptation of Thea von Harbou's science fiction novel to be directed and written by Sam Esmail was announced as not moving forward.

Middleton plays Molly Millions in Apple TV's Neuromancer, a limited series adaptation of William Gibson's 1984 novel.

== Personal life ==
Middleton grew up in a military family, and lived in Germany, Tennessee and Louisiana. She currently lives in New Orleans.

== Filmography ==
=== Film ===
Year	Title	Role	Notes
2021	The Tender Bar	Sidney	
2023	Sharper	Sandra	
2024	The Inheritance	Hannah Abernathy	
2024	The Silent Planet	Niyya	
2025	The History of Sound	Thankful Mary Swain	

=== Television ===
Year	Title	Role	Notes
2027	Neuromancer †	Molly	Upcoming series
