= Soul Mates (2023 American film) =

Horror film by Mark Gantt

- Directed by: Mark Gantt
- Written by: Chris LaMont; Joe Russo
- Produced by: William K. Baker; Yolanda Halley; Manny Halley; Rodney Turner II; Lee Daniels; Annie Ilonzeh
- Starring: Annie Ilonzeh; Charlie Weber; Neal McDonough
- Cinematography: Andrew Russo
- Edited by: Zachary Weintraub
- Music by: Sean Murray
- Production company: Imani Media Group
- Distributed by: Faith Media Distribution
- Release date: October 20, 2023
- Running time: 95 minutes
- Country: United States
- Language: English
- Box office: $95,507

Soul Mates is a 2023 American horror-thriller film written by Chris LaMont and Joe Russo and directed by Mark Gantt. The film stars Annie Ilonzeh, Charlie Weber, and Neal McDonough, and follows two unsuspecting strangers who must find their way out of a nightmarish maze into which they were forced as part of a new dating service created to help them find their Soul Mate.

The film was produced by Imani Media Group and released in selected theatres by Faith Media Distribution on October 20, 2023.

== Cast ==
- Annie Ilonzeh as Allison
- Charlie Weber as Jason
- Neal McDonough as Matchmaker
- Kayla Eva as Liana
- Starletta DuPois as Marie

== Reception ==
On the review aggregator website Rotten Tomatoes, 56% of 9 critics' reviews are positive, with an average rating of 5.6/10.

Variety film critic Owen Gleiberman wrote in his review: "As directed by Mark Gantt, Soul Mates is watchable semi-extreme trash. It's not as good as the best Saw films, but it's better than the worst of them."
