= Saturday Night Live parodies of Bill Clinton =

The 42nd President of the United States, Bill Clinton, has been parodied on Saturday Night Live (SNL) since 1992. Clinton was in office from 1993 to 2001, and has been portrayed on the show over a hundred times, most often by Darrell Hammond.

== Background ==
Saturday Night Live has parodied U.S. presidents and other politicians since the show started in 1975. The numerous sketches on Clinton are often inspired by aspects of his presidency, the Lewinsky scandal, and his relationship with his wife, herself a frequent subject in SNL's political sketches.

== Phil Hartman (1992–1994) ==
Secret Service Agent: Fine. But please don't tell Mrs. Clinton.
Bill Clinton: Jim, let me tell you something - there's gonna be a lot of things we don't tell Mrs. Clinton about. Fast food is the least of our worries.

— Clinton at McDonald's, SNL, 1992.

Phil Hartman was the first cast member to portray Bill Clinton and did so until he left the show in 1994. Among his 18 appearances as Clinton, a December 1992 sketch, in which Clinton enters a McDonald's and eats customers' food while talking about politics, has been noted as a successful one.

Hartman also reprised his Clinton impression in The Simpsons for the "Treehouse of Horror VII" segment "Citizen Kang", which parodied the 1996 United States Presidential election.

== Darrell Hammond (1995–2019) ==
Darrell Hammond took over the role during his SNL tenure from 1995 to 2009. Like Hartman, Hammond has been considered one of SNL's best political impersonators, and on the show he parodied several other American politicians. SNL's ratings rose at the peak of the Lewinsky-scandal, and when Monica Lewinsky guested the show in 1999, she appeared with Hammond's Clinton. In the sketch, Clinton dreams of the life after his presidency, and Lewinsky is his wife.

In 1997, he appeared as Clinton at the Radio and Television Correspondents' Association dinner. According to Hammond, he met Clinton at the White House before the event "in full Clinton drag". Telling Clinton that he felt foolish, the president replied "I think you look terrific." He also did an impression of Clinton as part of a 2001 White House Correspondents' Association dinner performance, after Clinton left office.

Hammond has returned as Clinton several times since he left the cast, and has played the part on the show over 90 times.

== Others ==
A 1994 sketch had several cast members auditioning to play Clinton, including Chris Farley, David Spade, Chris Elliott, Adam Sandler, and Tim Meadows. Michael McKean briefly played Clinton after Hartman, at the end of 1994. Dana Carvey once appeared as a "young Clinton" in a 1996 sketch where Bob Dole (Norm Macdonald) uses a time-machine. Beck Bennett played Clinton once, in 2013.
