= Sonoma International Film Festival =

Coordinates: 38.2916°N 122.4565°W

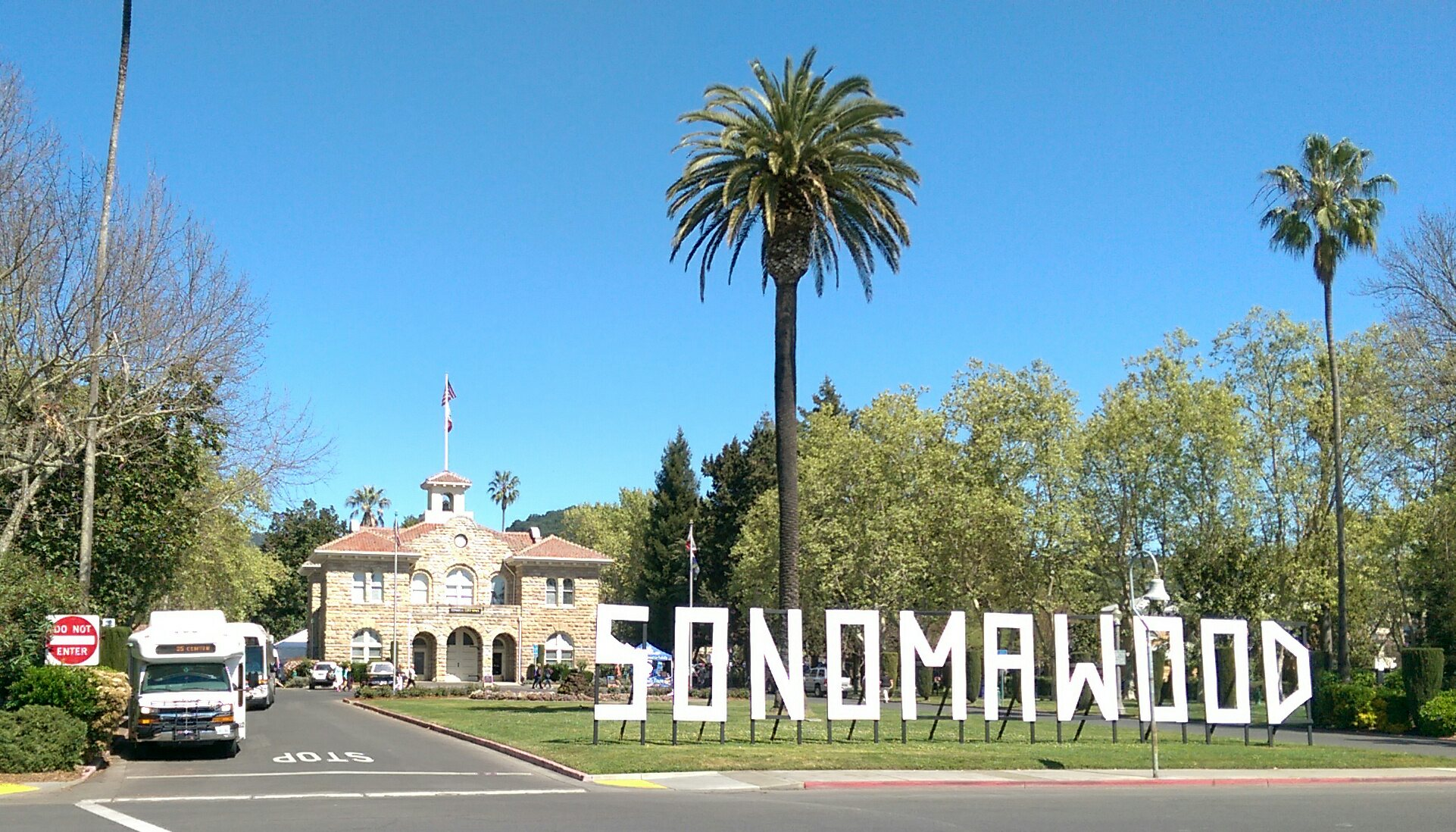
Signage on the Sonoma Plaza during the 2015 Sonoma International Film Festival

The Sonoma International Film Festival (SIFF) is a 501 (c)(3) non-profit arts organization, founded in 1997, headquartered in Sonoma, California.

== History ==
Founded in 1997 by friends Carolyn Stolman and Jerry Seltzer, the Sonoma International Film Festival was created to promote Sonoma, California, and its sister cities, as a destination festival to showcase the cinematic arts.

Early festivals focused on the breadth of Bay Area filmmakers with work from industry veterans such as Francis Ford Coppola, John Lasseter, and Danny Glover showcased.

SIFF programs full-length features, documentaries, as well as shorts programming in animation, comedy, culinary, documentary, dramatic and foreign categories. Cash and production completion grants are awarded annually to Jury and Audience Award winners.

== Recognition ==
The festival was named "One of the 25 Coolest Festivals" by MovieMaker and one of "America’s Top Ten Destination Film Festivals" by USA Today as part of their Readers Choice Awards.
