= Darrell Hammond =

American actor and comedian (born 1955)

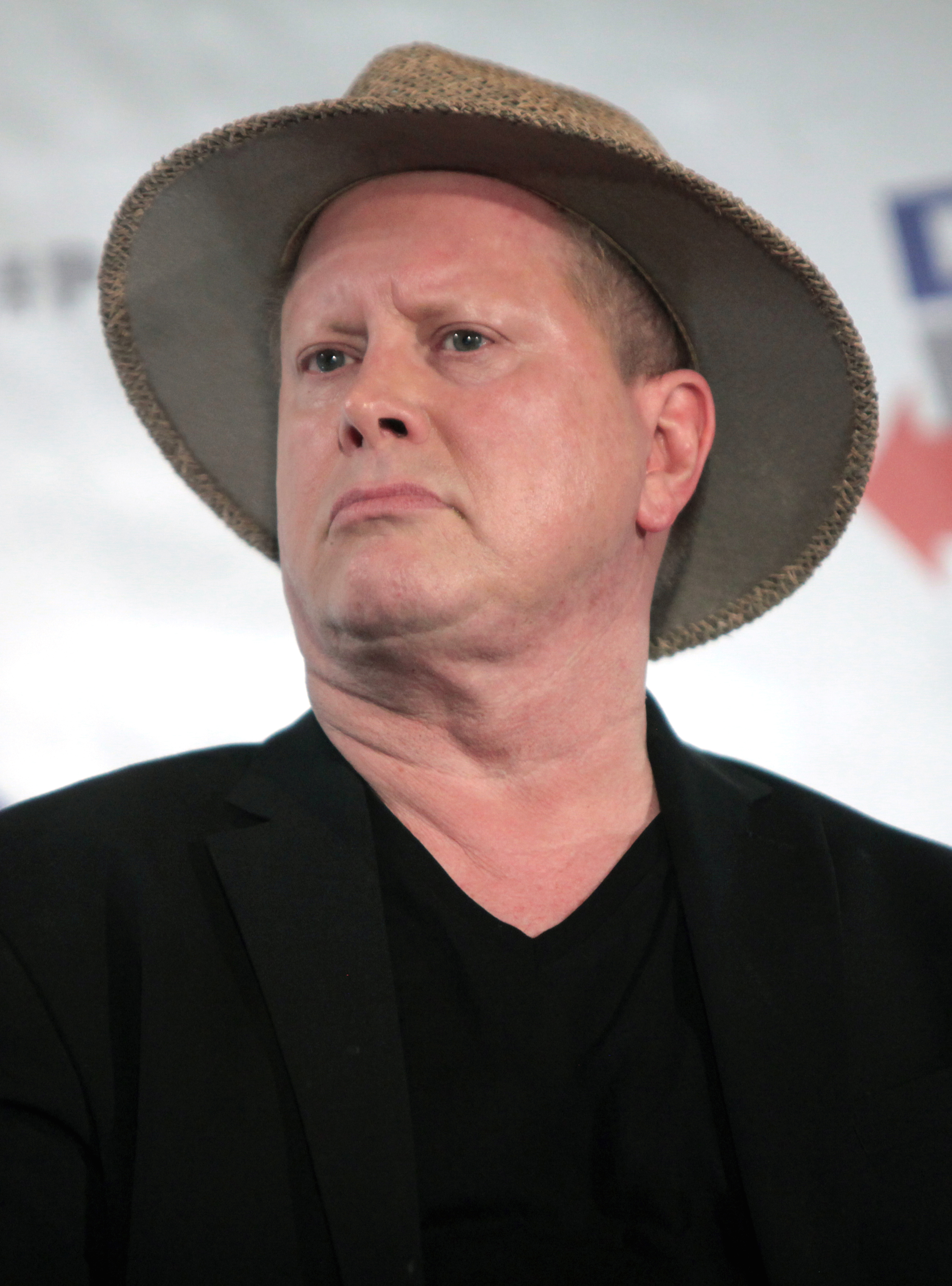
- Hammond in 2016
- Born: Darrell Clayton Hammond; October 8, 1955 (age 71); Melbourne, Florida, U.S.
- Education: Brevard Community College; University of Florida (BA)
- Occupations: Actor; comedian; impressionist; announcer
- Years active: 1976–present
- Spouses: Elizabeth Hammond (m. 1990; div. 1994) (m. 1997; div. 2012)
- Children: 1

Darrell Clayton Hammond (born October 8, 1955) is an American actor, comedian, impressionist, and announcer. He was a regular cast member on the NBC sketch comedy series Saturday Night Live from 1995 to 2009, and has been its announcer since 2014.

Upon his departure from the cast in 2009, Hammond, at age 53, was the oldest cast member in the show's history. He has made more SNL appearances than any other cast member besides Kenan Thompson, and impersonated more than 107 celebrities, with Bill Clinton as his most frequent impression. On September 19, 2014, Hammond was announced as the new announcer of SNL, replacing Don Pardo, who had died the month before.

== Early life ==
Hammond was born in Melbourne, Florida, the son of Margaret and Max Hammond. He was severely abused by his mother, contributing to his lifelong struggles with depression and substance abuse. Hammond's father, dealing with his own psychological problems resulting from his military service during World War II, often drank heavily and acted out violently. Hammond found as a child that doing impressions was the only thing he did his mother liked.

He played baseball in high school and at Brevard Community College. In high school, he was a teammate of future San Diego Padres, San Francisco Giants and Texas Rangers manager Bruce Bochy. He went on to attend the University of Florida, where he graduated in 1978 with a degree in advertising and a 2.1 GPA. He credits UF theater professor David Shelton for encouraging his work. After completing college, Hammond moved to New York City where he worked as a waiter, studied at HB Studio, played roles in theater productions, and performed one set at a comedy club at age 26. Hammond then returned to Florida where he was a radio DJ at BJ 105 FM, telling Howard Stern in 2002, "First I tried to be a jock, which I really sucked at," followed by being a voiceover artist in the Orlando area.

== Career ==
=== Saturday Night Live ===
At 32 years old, Hammond moved back to New York to make one last attempt at being a stand-up comedian. After seven years and two failed Saturday Night Live auditions, he was spotted in 1995 by an SNL producer while doing a Bill Clinton impression - shortly after Phil Hartman, who had portrayed Clinton, left the show. After an exclusive audition for creator and executive producer Lorne Michaels, Hammond was brought on board as a cast member and remained a cast member for 14 seasons. Before Kenan Thompson overtook him in 2017, he held the record as the longest-tenured cast member in SNL's history.

He also holds SNL records for the second most impressions by a single cast member (107, as of the Zac Efron/Yeah Yeah Yeahs episode), exceeded only by Thompson, and also for being the cast member who has uttered the iconic catchphrase "Live from New York, it's Saturday Night!" to start the show the highest number of times (76, beating out Dana Carvey).

He is best known on the show not only for his impersonations of Bill Clinton, but also of Al Gore, Donald Trump, John McCain, Regis Philbin, Dick Cheney, Chris Matthews, Rodney Dangerfield, Richard Dreyfuss, Phil Donahue, Phil McGraw, Ted Koppel, John Travolta, Jesse Jackson, Geraldo Rivera, Dan Rather, and Sean Connery, in the recurring "Celebrity Jeopardy!" skits. No one on SNL has done any one impression more than Hammond's Clinton, having impersonated him in 87 sketches over 14 years in the cast and in numerous additional cameos. Hammond also impersonated SNL announcer Don Pardo, filling in for Pardo on occasions when the announcer was unavailable.

Hammond initially planned to leave Saturday Night Live, after the conclusion of season 31, after 11 years, but many people at SNL, including his then-manager Bernie Brillstein, advised him to stay on. He describes his last three seasons as a difficult period, as all the writers who knew how to write for him had left by the start of his 12th season, and he wasn't assigned to portray any members of the incoming Obama administration.

After the end of SNL's 34th year, Hammond retired from the show after a record-breaking 14 years as a repertory player. Hammond was the last SNL cast member from the 1990s to leave the show.

In 2014, Hammond took over the announcer role on SNL starting with the 40th-season premiere, replacing Pardo, who had died a month prior. He was told by executive producer Lorne Michaels not to directly impersonate Pardo, so Hammond ended up using his own voice for the announcement gig. Since he began as announcer, he has also reprised his Clinton and Trump impersonations in several skits.

The following season Hammond reappeared on the show, doing his impression of Trump just as the real Trump began performing well in the Republican primaries. Hammond moved back to New York in 2016 after Trump won the nomination, expecting to be appearing on a weekly basis during the election. However, SNL producer Lorne Michaels decided instead to go with Alec Baldwin's impression, believing that it more effectively captured the contemporary Trump.

=== Other work ===
In the late 1980s, Hammond gained fame for his impersonations of Elmer Fudd and other Looney Tunes characters in the comedy single "Wappin'." The song was popular enough with Dr. Demento listeners to be included on the show's 20th-anniversary compilation.

Hammond is a frequent guest on The Howard Stern Show. He has also guest-starred in episodes of Law & Order: Special Victims Unit and Law & Order: Criminal Intent;. He had his own stand-up comedy special on Comedy Central: Comedy Central Presents Darrell Hammond. Hammond can frequently be seen at The Comedy Cellar in New York City.

In the summer of 2007, Hammond made his Broadway theatre debut, playing the role of Vice Principal Douglas Panch in The 25th Annual Putnam County Spelling Bee. In 2009, Hammond had a guest starring role on the FX drama Damages. The same summer, Hammond appeared with Eli Manning, Peyton Manning, and Donald Trump in an Oreo commercial, where he does an impression of Trump.

Beginning in May 2015, Hammond began playing the role of fast-food mascot Colonel Sanders in an ad campaign for KFC, until Norm Macdonald replaced him on August 17, 2015.

Since returning to Los Angeles in 2017, Hammond has appeared in episodes of Criminal Minds, At Home with Amy Sedaris, and a Friday Night Lights spoof series on sports website The Kicker.

== Personal life ==
Hammond married his wife, Elizabeth, on May 9, 1990. The couple divorced in the early 1990s, then remarried in 1997. They have a daughter together. During a 2012 appearance on the Imus in the Morning radio program, Hammond revealed that the couple was in the process of divorcing, and later that same year the divorce became final.

Hammond has admitted to struggling with alcoholism and cocaine addiction. The death of a close friend in 1991 led to a drug and alcohol relapse. Hammond regularly wears all black when not performing as an homage to another friend who died by suicide in 1992. After another relapse in 2009, Hammond went to rehab.

In August 2011, Hammond filed a lawsuit against Jose Mendez and Dona Monteleone after a car accident in which he was the passenger. Monteleone, who was driving Hammond's vehicle at the time of the accident, is a Manhattan real estate agent.

During an October 2011 interview with CNN, Hammond revealed that his mother had abused him during his childhood. His anxiety from abuse led to cutting, several hospitalizations due to psychiatric problems, and diagnoses which initially included bipolar disorder, schizophrenia, and borderline personality disorder.

Hammond says that he was medicated throughout his tenure on Saturday Night Live, and that he cut himself backstage and was once taken from the studio to a psychiatric ward. The incident helped him come to terms with what he and the doctor who treated him realized was his fundamental problem, the posttraumatic stress disorder stemming from his abusive childhood. Just prior to his 2000 appearance as Al Gore in a sketch parodying that year's first presidential debate, he had a panic attack after forgetting his lines. However, his performance was so compelling that Gore's campaign staff made the candidate watch it to understand why some voters responded negatively to him.

HarperCollins published Hammond's memoir, God, If You're Not Up There, I'm F*cked, in 2011. It is an account of his abusive childhood, psychiatric problems, struggles with substance abuse, and experiences on Saturday Night Live. In 2015 he adapted it into a one-man play starring himself, directed by Christopher Ashley, which debuted in San Diego, California, at La Jolla Playhouse to positive reviews. The director has expressed plans for a Broadway residency, although Hammond stated he would prefer an actor to play him instead, as he found the tour so stressful he had to be hospitalized twice during the Los Angeles run.

In 2015, Hammond revived his Trump impression on SNL, after Taran Killam's attempt didn't sufficiently capture public interest. The following year he returned to New York after five years, expecting that with Trump having received the Republican presidential nomination that year, he would be appearing on the show more in the fall. When Alec Baldwin replaced him, he fell into a deep depression and was prescribed Antabuse and a beta blocker to prevent a relapse of his addiction problems. Hammond and his girlfriend eventually moved back to Los Angeles, where reminders of Baldwin's Trump impression were less prominent.

=== Entrapment incident ===
In the late 1980s, Hammond said that he worked briefly as a stand-up comedian on Premier Cruise Line ships. One evening, while the ship was docked in the Bahamas, Hammond says he visited a restaurant, where he consumed the equivalent of 16 shots of rum. He claimed that a man repeatedly asked him throughout the evening to take a dollar bill with trace amounts of cocaine on it. When he left the bar to use the restroom, the man followed him into the stall and told him, "I think you should take this with you." Believing he was about to be mugged, he relented, and the man placed the bill inside Hammond's pocket. Local police were waiting outside the restroom and quickly arrested him.

According to Hammond, the United States Drug Enforcement Administration later told him that the episode had been a setup, and that local authorities regularly entrap American tourists. He spent a weekend in jail and was released after his father traveled to the Bahamas and paid $3,000 for his son's release.

Hammond first publicly mentioned his incarceration in the Bahamas as a guest on a 1998 episode of the radio show Loveline; and again when he returned to Loveline in 2000 and 2004, as well as during an appearance on the Opie & Anthony show in 2012.

== Filmography ==
=== Film ===
Year	Title	Role	Notes
1996	Celtic Pride	Chris McCarthy	
1998	Blues Brothers 2000	Robertson	
1999	The King and I	Master Little	Voice
2003	Agent Cody Banks	Earl	
2003	Scary Movie 3	Father Muldoon	
2004	New York Minute	Hudson McGill	
2006	Kiss Me Again	Michael	
2006	Puff, Puff, Pass	Jonathan	
2006	Ira & Abby	Dr. Lawrence Rosenblum	
2007	Epic Movie	Captain Jack Swallows	
2007	Netherbeast Incorporated	Turner Claymore	
2007	Shortcut to Happiness	Andrew Bailey	
2008	Wieners	Dr. Dwayne	
2012	BuzzKill	Karaoke Killer	
2012	Nature Calls	Ranger Deakins	
2013	Scary Movie 5	Dr. Hall	
2023	Cora Bora		
2024	Unfrosted	Ed McMahon	

=== Television ===
Year	Title	Role	Notes
1995–2009, 2014–present	Saturday Night Live	Various (1995–2009); announcer (2014–present)	308 episodes
1997	A Freezerburnt Christmas	Voice	Television film
2000	3rd Rock from the Sun	Darrell Hammond	Episode: "Dick'll Take Manhattan: Part 2"
2001	Law & Order: Special Victims Unit	Ted Bolger	Episode: "Runaway"
2001	Primetime Glick	Dick Cheney	Episode: "Kathie Lee Gifford/Dick Cheney"
2005	Law & Order: Criminal Intent	Leonard Timmons	Episode: "No Exit"
2005	Starved	Josh	Episode: "3D"
2005	Las Vegas	Ben Carlson / Carlos / Ted Waters	Episode: "Double Down, Triple Threat"
2009	Damages	The Deacon	7 episodes
2012	Are We There Yet?	Brick Street	6 episodes
2014	Deadbeat	Don Soderbergh	Episode: "The Knockoff"
2016	Unbreakable Kimmy Schmidt	Announcer	Episode: "Kimmy Goes Roller Skating!"
2016	Brad Neely's Harg Nallin' Sclopio Peepio	Various	10 episodes
2017	Criminal Minds	Lawrence Coleman	Episode: "The Bunker"
2017–2020	At Home with Amy Sedaris	Various	6 episodes
2018	The Last Sharknado: It's About Time	George Washington	Television film
2018	Dream Corp LLC	Bill Ruff	Episode: "Wild Bill"
2019	Bizaardvark	Red Duckworth	2 episodes
2021	What If...?	Nazi General (voice)	Episode: "What If... Captain Carter Were the First Avenger?"

Media offices
Preceded by Don Pardo	Saturday Night Live announcer 2014–present	Incumbent
