= G. Marq Roswell =

American music supervisor

G. Marq Roswell is an American tech entrepreneur, music supervisor, and film producer based in Los Angeles, California.

== Early years ==
Roswell was raised in Los Angeles, California.

Roswell attended UCLA Film School, graduating in 1971.

In 1976, he helped form and manage the band Player, which was signed to Robert Stigwood's RSO Records. The band's platinum single "Baby Come Back" eventually hit number one on the Billboard Hot 100 Chart, producing a gold album, and tours with Boz Scaggs, Kenny Loggins, Heart, and Eric Clapton. After attending an early screening at Paramount Studios of the Stigwood-produced Saturday Night Fever, with its breakout soundtrack by the Bee Gees, Roswell sold his management and publishing interest to partner Paul Palmer and pursued a career as a music supervisor for films.

== Music supervision ==
Roswell found a mentor in top music supervisor Becky Shargo Winding (Footloose, Urban Cowboy).

He began his career in music supervision by bringing the Fine Young Cannibals to director Barry Levinson to score and write songs for Tin Men, which became the catalyst for their follow up album The Raw and the Cooked, including hits "She Drives Me Crazy" and "Good Thing," which was written for the film.

While overseeing music supervision on The Commitments, Roswell formed and managed a joint venture between Beacon Films and Polygram Publishing (now Universal Music) to develop Irish musical artists and film scores. In that capacity, he was able to sign The Corrs and secure them a deal with Atlantic Records.

Roswell produced many score and soundtrack LPs for Beacon; Air Force One, Family Man, Spy Game, Sugar Hill, Bring It On, The Hurricane, Playing God, End of Days, Midnight Clear, Love of The Game, and The Commitments, among others. The Commitments was nominated for a Grammy and sold five million albums worldwide.

After music supervising the Chris Farley vehicle Tommy Boy for Paramount Pictures, Roswell became a consultant for Lorne Michaels' Broadway Video. It was there that he orchestrated a joint venture between Broadway Video and Mercury Records to develop comedy albums and DVDs featuring the live musical guests on Saturday Night Live.

Roswell contributed to the musical landscape of more than 60 feature films, numerous documentaries, television series, and produced many successful score and soundtrack albums. His list of credits includes The Great Debaters, The Hurricane, Man with the Iron Fists, Tommy Boy, Dawn of the Dead, and Wild at Heart.

Roswell also produced many "on-camera" songs for actors in feature films, including Nicolas Cage in Wild at Heart, Kevin Costner in Love of the Game and Keanu Reeves in Sweet November. These production efforts went on to also include many on-camera artists appearing on film soundtracks, including Koko Taylor for Wild at Heart and Sharon Jones, the Carolina Chocolate Drops and Alvin Youngblood Heart for The Great Debaters. On The Thing Called Love, set in Nashville song-mills, Roswell hired T Bone Burnett and Steven Soles to produce songs for actors River Phoenix, Sandra Bullock, Samantha Mathis, and Dermot Mulroney. Roswell and T Bone Burnett came together again to produce the end title song for A Midnight Clear, featuring singer Sam Phillips.

Roswell has worked on documentaries: Wal-Mart: The High Cost of Low Price, Iraq for Sale, and PBS' Circus & Half the Sky. He is the co-executive music producer with Carter Little on Grammy nominated Soundbreaking, the 8-hour documentary series, conceived with and inspired by Sir George Martin. He is co-music supervisor with Dondi Baste in the Apollo Theater documentary, directed by Academy Award winner Roger Ross Williams and produced by Nigel Sinclair of White Horse Pictures.

== Film producer ==
Roswell co-produced I Saw the Light, directed and written by Marc Abraham, starring Tom Hiddleston, who portrays the singer-songwriter Hank Williams. The soundtrack album was produced by Rodney Crowell, Roswell, Carter Little, and Ray Kennedy.

== Personal life ==
Roswell lives in the Pacific Palisades with his wife Karen, and his son.

== Filmography ==
- Soundbreaking (2016)
- I Saw the Light (2015)
- The Man with the Iron Fists (2012)
- Half the Sky (2012)
- Marina Abramovic: The Artist is Present (2012)
- Birth Story (2012)
- Amnesty International 50th Anniversary (2011)
- Chevy 100: An American Story (2011)
- Circus (2010)
- Flash of Genius (2008)
- Garden Party (2008)
- The Great Debaters (2007)
- The Brothers Solomon (2007)
- The Bronx Is Burning (2007)
- The Last Day of Summer (2007)
- The Grand (2007)
- Let's Go to Prison (2006)
- Hard Luck (2006)
- Iraq for Sale (2006)
- Walmart: The High Cost of Low Price (2005)
- Casanova (2005)
- An Unfinished Life (2005)
- The Big White (2005)
- Man of the House (2005)
- Dawn of the Dead (2004)
- Redemption (2004)
- Killer Diller (2004)
- Walking Tall (2004)
- Baadasssss! (2003)
- Auto Focus (2002)
- Collateral Damage (2002)
- Rock Star (2001)
- Spy Game (2001)
- Sweet November (2001)
- Pay It Forward (2000)
- Bring It On (2000)
- The Family Man (2000)
- The Replacements (2000)
- It Had to Be You (2000)
- End of Days (1999)
- The Hurricane (1999)
- For the Love of the Game (1999)
- Simpatico (1999)
- Varsity Blues (1999)
- Slums of Beverly Hills (1998)
- Playing God (1997)
- 'Til There Was You (1997)
- Kids in the Hall: Brain Candy (1996)
- The Baby-Sitters Club (1995)
- Tommy Boy (1995)
- Princess Caraboo (1994)
- The Road to Wellville (1994)
- Sugar Hill (1993)
- The Thing Called Love (1993)
- Three of Hearts (1993)
- The Gun in Betty Lou's Handbag (1992)
- A Midnight Clear (1992)
- Ladybugs (1992)
- Frankie and Johnny (1991)
- The Commitments (1991)
- Career Opportunities (1991)
- Sleeping with the Enemy (1991)
- A Gnome Named Gnorm (1990)
- Wild at Heart (1990)
- Madhouse (1990)
- Love or Money (1990)
- Big Man on Campus (1989)
- The Blue Iguana (1988)
- Cross My Heart (1987)
- Tin Men (1987)

== See also ==
- Gary Calamar
