= Dawn of the Dead (soundtrack) =

Dawn of the Dead (Original Motion Picture Soundtrack)

Film score by Tyler Bates
- Released: July 5, 2011 (digital); July 12, 2011 (physical)
- Recorded: 2003–2004
- Studios: Newman Scoring Stage, 20th Century Fox Studios, Los Angeles; Capitol Studios, Hollywood
- Genre: Film score
- Length: 64:36
- Label: Milan Records
- Producer: Tyler Bates

Tyler Bates chronology
You Got Served (2004)	Dawn of the Dead (2004)	Baadasssss! (2004)

Dawn of the Dead (Original Motion Picture Soundtrack) is the soundtrack to the 2004 film of the same name directed by Zack Snyder in his directorial debut. The score for the film was composed by Tyler Bates, marking the beginning of a collaboration between the director and musician for Snyder's 300 (2006), Watchmen (2009) and Sucker Punch (2011).

The score was not officially released alongside the film. In July 2011, Milan Records distributed the score in digital and physical formats. A vinyl edition of the album released in December 2014.

== Development ==
Tyler Bates was first involved in the project after being recommended by music supervisor, G. Marq Roswell, as both of them were involved on the Mario Van Peebles's film Baadasssss! (2003). However, the studio was not convinced on his hiring because he was not an established composer at that time, but upon Snyder's insistence, he was ultimately hired.

While scoring the film, he avoided taking cues from the original film's music by the band Goblin, as he felt it incompatible with what Snyder had filmed. Although he liked Goblin's themes for the counterpart, he felt it was specific to that period and Snyder's version had a "different attitude" in comparison to the original film. Hence, he let go of the popular themes from the original film, including the main title theme which he felt it "as cool and was a different thing". Influenced by the works of composers adept at creating dissonant themes, such as Béla Bartók and Krzysztof Penderecki, He combined elements of electronic music and 20th-century orchestra with the intention of making the audience "very, very uncomfortable".

== Release ==
The score was not officially released to the general public upon release. On July 5, 2011, seven years after the film's premiere, Milan Records distributed the film's soundtrack digitally via iTunes Store and Amazon Music, and in physical formats on July 12. The album featured the complete score from the film, comprising over 31 tracks. On December 16, 2014, Milan Records released the soundtrack in 180-gram vinyl record in a limited pressing of 500 copies. Most of the tracks were excluded in the record, condensing up to 16 tracks in the album.

== Track listing ==
All music written, composed, and produced by Tyler Bates.

Standard edition
No.	Title	Length
1.	"Brainscan"	0:44
2.	"Hell on Earth"	3:30
3.	"Gunman"	0:40
4.	"Anna Drives"	1:47
5.	"We're Going to the Mall"	2:37
6.	"Scoping Out Metropolis"	0:57
7.	"Michael Investigates"	0:50
8.	"Zombie Spike"	2:47
9.	"We Need to Suture That Arm"	0:49
10.	"Don't Give Him That Gun!"	0:53
11.	"America Always Sorts Its Shit Out"	1:34
12.	"Ben Cozine"	1:24
13.	"Maybe The're Coming for Us"	1:39
14.	"How Will Your God Judge You"	1:00
15.	"Shut Your Fucking Mouth"	2:08
16.	"Truck Over Zombies"	1:36
17.	"Blood Bath City"	1:58
18.	"Bloated She Rises"	0:33
19.	"It's Only a Matter of Time"	4:57
20.	"Breathe"	3:50
21.	"That Dog's Just Fucked Up"	1:37
22.	"Luda's Transformation"	2:08
23.	"You Wanna Kill My Family"	4:18
24.	"We Have to Do Something Now"	3:17
25.	"I'm Not a Plumber"	3:54
26.	"Subterranean Sewer Attack"	2:14
27.	"Hangman's Song"	1:15
28.	"Sailing the Sea of Zombies"	1:58
29.	"Chainsaw to the Breastbone"	3:49
30.	"Fucking Figures"	1:42
31.	"Enjoy the Sunrise"	2:11
Total length:		64:36

Vinyl release
No.	Title	Length
1.	"Hell on Earth"	3:30
2.	"We're Going to the Mall"	2:37
3.	"Zombie Spike"	2:47
4.	"America Always Sorts Its Shit Out"	1:34
5.	"How Will Your God Judge You"	1:00
6.	"Truck Over Zombies"	1:36
7.	"Blood Bath City"	1:58
8.	"It's Only a Matter of Time"	4:57
9.	"That Dog's Just Fucked Up"	1:37
10.	"We Have to Do Something Now"	3:17
11.	"Subterranean Sewer Attack"	2:14
12.	"Hangman's Song"	1:15
13.	"Sailing the Sea of Zombies"	1:58
14.	"Chainsaw to the Breastbone"	3:49
15.	"Fucking Figures"	1:42
16.	"Enjoy the Sunrise"	2:11
Total length:		38:02

== Accolades ==
Bates received a nomination for International Film Music Critics Association Award for Best Original Score for a Horror/Thriller Film, but lost to James Newton Howard for The Village (2004).

== Credits ==
Credits adapted from CD liner notes.

- Music composed, arranged and produced by – Tyler Bates
- Recording – John Richards, Michael Farrow, Charlie Paakkari
- Recording engineer – John Rodd
- Mixing – John Richards
- Mixing assistance – Tom Hardisty
- Mastering – Christian Dwiggins
- Music editor – Darrell Hall
- Auricle operator – Richard Grant
- Pro-tools engineer – Larry Mah
- Executive producer – Stefan Karrer, Jean-Christophe Chamboredon
- Executive in charge of music – Michael Knobloch
- Music business affairs – Philip Cohen
- Music preparation – Tim Rodier, Julian Bratolyubov
- Music supervisor – G. Marq Roswell
- Liner notes – Zack Snyder
- Design and layout – Shawn Lyon

Instruments

- Bass drum – Dan Greco
- Cymbal – Bob Zimmitti
- Drums – Dave Lombardo
- Electronics – Wolfgang Matthes
- Piano – Tyler Bates
- Taiko drums – Greg Ellis, Dan Greco, Bob Zimmitti

Orchestra

- Orchestra conductor – Pete Anthony
- Orchestra contractor – Debbie Datz-Pyle
- Orchestrated by – Bruce Fowler, Rick Giovinazzo, Tom Calderaro
