= Thomas Bliss =

American film producer

- Thomas A. Bliss at the Cannes Film Festival in 2004
- Born: Thomas Albert Bliss; December 13, 1952 (age 73); Hollywood, California, U.S.
- Education: UCLA Film School; UCLA School of Law
- Occupation: Film producer
- Years active: 1984–present
- Organization: Strike Entertainment

Thomas Albert Bliss (born December 13, 1952) is an American motion picture producer and executive producer. He is a founding partner at Strike Entertainment.

From 1984 to the present, Bliss has been credited with producing more than 30 productions (including The Hurricane and Air Force One)

== Career ==
Bliss attended UCLA Film School (1975), later returning to UCLA School of Law for law school (Juris Doctor, 1982). He was admitted to The State Bar of California in 1983. Bliss is a graduate of Directors Guild of America Producers Training Plan.

Bliss is a member of the Directors Guild of America and the Academy of Motion Picture Arts and Sciences.

== Awards ==
Bliss has been honored with a Peabody Award, two CableACE Awards, and an American Red Cross Humanities Service Medal.

== Select filmography ==
He was a producer in all films unless otherwise noted.

=== Film ===
Year	Film	Credit	Notes
1995	The Baby-Sitters Club	Executive producer	
1995	Just Looking		
1996	Box of Moonlight		
1996	364 Girls a Year		
1997	Air Force One	Executive producer	
1997	A Thousand Acres	Executive producer	
1997	Playing God	Executive producer	
1999	Trippin'	Executive producer	
1999	The Hurricane	Executive producer	
1999	End of Days	Executive producer	
2000	Bring It On		
2000	The Family Man	Executive producer	
2000	Thirteen Days	Executive producer	
2001	Spy Game	Executive producer	
2002	Tuck Everlasting	Executive producer	
2002	The Emperor's Club	Executive producer	
2004	Bring It On Again		Direct-to-video
2004	Dawn of the Dead	Executive producer	
2006	Slither	Executive producer	
2006	Children of Men	Executive producer	
2008	Flash of Genius	Executive producer	
2010	The Last Exorcism		
2012	The Man with the Iron Fists	Executive producer	
2013	The Last Exorcism Part II		

Second unit director or assistant director

Year	Film	Role
1981	Zoot Suit	DGA trainee

Production manager

Year	Film	Role
1994	Princess Caraboo	Executive in charge of production

Miscellaneous crew

Year	Film	Role
1992	A Midnight Clear	Production executive

Thanks

Year	Film	Role
1991	The Commitments	Thanks

=== Television ===
Year	Title	Credit	Notes
1987	Heroes: Made in the USA		
1987	Glory Years	Associate producer	Television film
1987−88	Pee-wee's Playhouse	Associate producer	
1988	Christmas at Pee Wee's Playhouse	Associate producer	Television special
1989	Hunt for Stolen War Treasures		Television film
1990	Mother Goose Rock 'n' Rhyme	Co-producer	Television film
1990	A Very Retail Christmas	Line producer	Television short
1993	A Life in the Theatre		Television film

Second unit director or assistant director

Year	Title	Role	Notes
1979	Can You Hear the Laughter? The Story of Freddie Prinze	DGA trainee	Television film
1980	Murder Can Hurt You	DGA trainee	Television film
1981	The Archer: Fugitive from the Empire	DGA trainee	Television film
1981	Scruples	DGA trainee	Television pilot
1981	Dark Night of the Scarecrow	DGA trainee	Television film
1981	McClain's Law	DGA trainee	
1980−81	The Love Boat	Trainee assistant director	Uncredited
1983−84	Buffalo Bill	Second assistant director	
1986	Billy Crystal: Don't Get Me Started - The Billy Crystal Special	Assistant director	Television special

Production manager

Year	Title	Role	Notes
1988	Liberace: Behind the Music	Unit production manager	Television film
1989	Your Mother Wears Combat Boots	Unit production manager	Television film
1988−89	1st & Ten	Unit production manager	
1990	Mother Goose Rock 'n' Rhyme	Unit production manager	Television film
1990	A Very Retail Christmas	Unit production manager	Television short
