= I Saw the Light (film) =

- Theatrical release poster
- Directed by: Marc Abraham
- Written by: Marc Abraham
- Based on: Hank Williams: The Biography by Colin Escott; George Merritt; William MacEwen
- Produced by: Marc Abraham; Aaron L. Gilbert; Brett Ratner; G. Marq Roswell
- Starring: Tom Hiddleston; Elizabeth Olsen; Cherry Jones; Bradley Whitford; Maddie Hasson; Wrenn Schmidt
- Cinematography: Dante Spinotti
- Edited by: Alan Heim
- Music by: Aaron Zigman
- Production companies: Bron Studios; CW Media Finance; RatPac Entertainment
- Distributed by: Sony Pictures Classics
- Release dates: September 11, 2015 (TIFF); March 25, 2016 (United States)
- Running time: 123 minutes
- Country: United States
- Language: English
- Budget: $13 million
- Box office: $1.8 million

I Saw the Light is a 2015 American biographical drama film directed, written, and produced by Marc Abraham, starring Tom Hiddleston as country music legend Hank Williams and Elizabeth Olsen as his first wife, Audrey Williams. It is based on the book Hank Williams: The Biography by Colin Escott, George Merritt, and William (Bill) MacEwen. It was screened in the Special Presentations section of the 2015 Toronto International Film Festival.

The film is a biographical dramatization of country and blues singer-songwriter Hank Williams, his life and rise to fame as one of country music's most popular and influential artists. The title comes from the gospel song of the same name written and performed by Williams. The film was released on March 25, 2016, by Sony Pictures Classics.

== Premise ==
The film revolves around country music singer Hank Williams' rise to fame and sudden death at the age of 29. It also explains his rocky marriage to and eventual divorce from Audrey Sheppard mostly due to his alcoholism and infidelity.

== Cast ==
- Tom Hiddleston as Hank Williams
- Elizabeth Olsen as Audrey Sheppard Williams, Hank's wife, manager, duet partner and mother of their son, Hank Williams Jr.
- Cherry Jones as Lillie Skipper Williams, Hank's mother
- Bradley Whitford as Fred Rose, co-owner of Acuff-Rose song publishing in Nashville, who produced Williams' records and co-wrote several songs with Williams
- Maddie Hasson as Billie Jean, a 19-year-old pursued by Hank after his divorce from Audrey, who eventually becomes his second wife and widow
- Wrenn Schmidt as Bobbie Jett, who had a short relationship with Hank after his divorce from Audrey and gave birth to their daughter, Jett Williams
- David Krumholtz as James Dolan, a New York journalist.
- Josh Pais as Dore Schary, a movie director, producer, and former head of MGM Studios
- James DuMont as WB Nolan, a music promoter and small-town mayor
- Casey Bond as Jerry Rivers
- Jayson Warner Smith as Hank Snow
- Michael Rinne as Lum York, bass player in Hank's band, the Drifting Cowboys
- Joshua Brady as Sammy Pruett, lead guitarist in the Drifting Cowboys
- Wes Langlois as Don Helms, steel guitarist in the Drifting Cowboys
- Von Lewis as Ray Price, a country singer and roommate of Hank Williams'
- Fred Parker Jr. as Faron Young
- Rob Boltin as Frank Walker, president of MGM Records

== Production ==
=== Pre-production ===
Director Marc Abraham began developing the film in 2009 and adapted the screenplay himself. In June 2014, producers secured the rights to Williams' music for the film after making a deal with Sony ATV. Aaron L. Gilbert with Bron Studios produced the film alongside Brett Ratner's production company RatPac Entertainment, G. Marq Roswell and Abraham. Creative Wealth Media Finance financed the film. On June 12, 2014, British actor Tom Hiddleston who was set to play Hank Williams, posted an image of himself on his Twitter account, dressed as Williams with the title of the film as the caption.

Hiddleston sang his own music for the film, also taking on Williams' Southern accent. To prepare for the film and work on his singing and guitar playing, Hiddleston practiced with country singer Rodney Crowell. In July 2014, Crowell signed on to be the executive music producer for the film while Carter Little, who has worked with the Black Keys on The Man With the Iron Fists, signed on to serve as music supervisor. Crowell said of Hiddleston: "After nearly a month spent collaborating with this gifted artist, I'm as respectful of the man's work ethic as I'm mystified by his transformational skills. Without a doubt, the filmmakers chose the right actor for the job."

At the 2014 Wheatland Music Festival, Hiddleston sang "Move It on Over" and "Jambalaya (On the Bayou)", promoting the film.

Casting for the film for extras and additional actors begin in September 2014. Casting was done by Legacy Casting and Tracy Kilpatrick of The Casting Office. On September 12, Rolling Stone announced that Elizabeth Olsen would be playing Audrey Williams, Hank's wife, manager and duet partner.

=== Filming ===
Principal photography took place in Shreveport, Louisiana, starting in October 2014 and ending in December 2014.

== Criticism ==
Williams' grandson, singer Hank Williams III, has publicly expressed his displeasure for Hiddleston's singing skills. Soon after Hiddleston's performance of "Move It on Over" at the Wheatland Music Festival, Williams posted negative criticism of aspects of Hiddleston's voice on Facebook, along with a video of himself singing his grandfather's hit.

Williams went on to critique Hiddleston's role, saying, "To do a Hank Williams movie the way it should be done you need certain aspects in the mix to make right. It goes way beyond having an American to play the role of Hiram Hank Williams Sr. for it to be somewhat natural, it needs to be an American from the South who has eaten, lived and breathed these kind of roles before." On September 11, 2015, soon after Hiddleston posted a film clip on social media, Williams made another statement on Facebook, saying that the film seemed to lack "justice and real foundation."

Conversely, Holly Williams, granddaughter of Hank Williams Sr. and half-sister of Hank Williams III, praised Hiddleston's performance, stating in an interview with Rolling Stone, "Tom really put his whole heart and soul into it. He worked so hard to embody everything about Hank, all of the nuances and who Hank really was. Tom put all his passion into his performance."

== Soundtrack ==
I Saw the Light (Original Motion Picture Soundtrack)

Soundtrack album by Various artists
- Released: March 25, 2016
- Length: 32:54
- Label: Legacy Recordings

The soundtrack for I Saw the Light was released on March 25, 2016, by Legacy Recordings. Seven of the songs are performed by Tom Hiddleston and the Saddle Spring Boys.

Track listing
No.	Title	Artist	Length
1.	"Hey Good Lookin'"	Tom Hiddleston and the Saddle Spring Boys	2:49
2.	"Move It on Over"	Tom Hiddleston and the Saddle Spring Boys	2:18
3.	"Anytime"	Eddy Arnold	2:52
4.	"Field Hand Man"	The Delmore Brothers	2:58
5.	"Jambalaya"	Tom Hiddleston and the Saddle Spring Boys	2:47
6.	"The Tennessee Waltz"	Jo Stafford	2:25
7.	"My Bucket's Got a Hole in It"	Tom Hiddleston and the Saddle Spring Boys	2:14
8.	"That's What's Knockin' Me Out"	Jimmy Liggins	2:07
9.	"Santa Baby"	Eartha Kitt	3:25
10.	"Why Don't You Love Me"	Tom Hiddleston and the Saddle Spring Boys	2:19
11.	"Please Don't Let Me Love You"	George Morgan	2:36
12.	"Honky Tonkin'"	Tom Hiddleston and the Saddle Spring Boys	2:41
13.	"Lovesick Blues" (Soundtrack Edit)	Emmett Miller	1:23
Total length:			32:54

== Release ==
The film was originally scheduled to be released on November 27, 2015, by Sony Pictures Classics. However, on October 16, the release date was pushed back to March 25, 2016, for the limited release, with wide expansion is getting started on April 1.

== Reception ==
I Saw the Light received mixed to negative reviews from critics. On Rotten Tomatoes, the film has an 20% score based on 158 reviews, with an average rating of 4.59/10. The site's consensus states: "I Saw the Light boasts a terrifically talented cast, but their performances aren't enough to enliven an unfocused biopic that never comes close to capturing its subject's timeless appeal." Metacritic reports a 47 out of 100 rating based on 35 critics, indicating "mixed or average" reviews.

Ignatiy Vishnevetsky of The A.V. Club criticized I Saw the Light for not having "a spark of insight or psychology to it," and stated "no character in the film ever comes across as more than an accent." Peter Travers of Rolling Stone gave the film one of four stars, stating "Not even a singin', boozin' Tom Hiddleston can save this tepid Hank Williams biopic from itself."
