= The Man with the Iron Fists 2 =

- DVD cover
- Directed by: Roel Reiné
- Screenplay by: RZA; John Jarrell
- Story by: RZA
- Produced by: Marc Abraham; Ogden Gavanski
- Starring: RZA; Sahajak Boonthanakit; Pim Bubear; Ocean Hou; Grace Huang; Andrew Lin; Khiri Steven Lowenstein; Dustin Nguyen
- Cinematography: Roel Reiné
- Edited by: Radu Ion; Charles Norris
- Music by: Howard Drossin
- Production companies: Arcade Pictures; Strike Entertainment; Universal 1440 Entertainment
- Distributed by: Universal Pictures Home Entertainment
- Release date: April 14, 2015
- Running time: 90 minutes
- Country: United States
- Language: English

The Man with the Iron Fists 2 is a 2015 American direct-to-video martial arts action film directed by Roel Reiné and written by RZA and John Jarrell. It is the sequel to the 2012 film The Man with the Iron Fists. The film stars RZA, Sahajak Boonthanakit, Pim Bubear, Ocean Hou, Grace Huang, Andrew Lin and Khiri Steven Lowenstein. The film was released on DVD and Blu-ray on April 14, 2015.

== Plot ==
Thaddeus is on his way to the monks at Wu Chi Temple on a quest for inner peace when he is attacked by the brother of Silver Lion and his henchmen. Thaddeus manages to defeat them all but receives a near fatal wound from claw of Silver's brother. He passes out and is seen drifting on a log down a river.

A narration tells about a spring of chi, the Golden Nectar flowing from the mountains that were protected by monks and the Gemini Twins. Lord Pi raided the temple in an attempt to gain control of the Golden Nectar but was defeated. His ghost is rumored to roam the mountains, still looking for the Nectar and stealing chi from anyone he encounters.

Meanwhile, in Tsai Fu village, a man is burying his daughter and demands that the killer be found. He challenges the mayor and Master Ho, the silver mine owner. All the men proceed to the mine to work where Master Ho is shown to be an oppressive task master, frequently maiming and killing underperforming workers. Most of the village men seek to rebel, but Li Kung talks them down. Another girl is killed, but nothing is done.

Li Kung's brother challenges Master Ho's man, Duyan, to a fight and wins. However, he is later found dead in the mines. Meanwhile, Li Kung's daughter, Innocence, finds Thaddeus floating in the river and tends him to health. His presence is hidden from the village, and he is moved to the old blacksmith's residence. Li Kung and his men find a hidden cave with a fountain which Kung drinks from. The cave is rich in silver but they hide the existence of the cave from Master Ho. Li Kung, infuriated by the death of his brother, challenges Master Ho's clan to a fight. He asks Thaddeus to build weapons for the village, but Thaddeus claims he is on a path of peace. He promises to forge better mining tools, but whatever the tools are used for are not Thaddeus' responsibility.

Li Kung defeats two of Master Ho's men, and Kung is threatened with the safety of his family. He replies by challenging Master Ho himself. However, on the way to the fight, a masked man cuts Kung badly. He proceeds with the fight in spite of his injuries and Master Ho aims punches to open the wound. As Ho is about to defeat Kung, Thaddeus arrives and saves his life. They are recaptured and sentenced to hanging the next morning. That night, his fellow miners aided by the bow wielding Mayor, rescue them. Thaddeus chooses to build the crippled Mayor iron legs, like his iron fists so he can join in the rebellion.

Li Kung reveals to the abbot of temple of the Golden Nectar that Master Ho wants to mine under the well and steal it. The abbot reveals that they did not kill Lord Pi because he was of royal blood but they ensured that he would never be able to steal the Nectar again. The monks join forces with the villagers against Master Ho and the Black Beetles to protect the source of the Golden Nectar.

The battle begins in the morning when the Mayor is revealed to be Lord Pi. His legs were cut off so he would not be able to try for the nectar again. After drinking from the spring, he steals the chi out of Innocence and kills her. After defeating the abbot, Lord Pi fights Li Kung, but together with Thaddeus, Kung manages to defeat and kill Lord Pi. Kung bathes his daughter in the river and is resuscitated. Thaddeus continues on his journey while the village is being rebuilt. Kung becomes Mayor and the villagers protect the source of chi.

== Cast ==
- RZA as The Blacksmith / Thaddeus Henry Smith / The Man with the Iron Fists
- Cary-Hiroyuki Tagawa as The Mayor / Lord Pi
- Carl Ng as Master Ho
- Dustin Nguyen as Li Kung
- Eugenia Yuan as Ah Ni
- Pim Bubear as Innocence
- Ocean Hou as Shou
- Grace Huang as Gemini Female
- Andrew Lin as Gemini Male
- Khiri Steven Lowenstein as Bing
- Charlie Ruedpokanon as Li Guang
- Sahajak Boonthanakit as Bolo
- Simon Yam as Cha Pao
- Dom Hetrakul as Duyan Jurne
- Chatchapol Kulsiriwuthichai as Guard

== Production ==
In January 2014, RZA announced the sequel, saying: "I just finished writing it. I just wrote the new screenplay and gave it to a new director. I think it’s going to go. Some of the same characters will be back."

== Reception ==
Ignatiy Vishnevetsky of The A.V. Club gave the film a C−, writing, "The appeal of wuxia lies in the way it creates a world of outsize values; everything, from somersaults to codes of honor, is bigger than it is in the real world. With the exception of a handful of gruesome takedowns and some brief flashes of the fantastical, The Man With Iron Fists 2 only suggests a world that is duller and cheaper-looking than the real thing." Kenneth Brown of Blu-ray.com said, "The Man with the Iron Fists 2: The Sting of the Scorpion is exactly what you'd expect from a low budget direct-to-video sequel to the original film, only this time with crafty DTV plumber Roel Reiné at the helm instead of RZA. Universal's Blu-ray release is better, thanks to a solid video presentation, excellent DTS-HD Master Audio 5.1 surround track, and decidedly decent selection of special features. That only helps, though, if you find the sequel to be guilty-pleasure-good rather than all-kindsa-bad."
