= Bring It On Again =

2004 film directed by Damon Santostefano

- DVD cover
- Directed by: Damon Santostefano
- Screenplay by: Claudia Grazioso; Brian Gunn; Mark Gunn
- Story by: Claudia Grazioso
- Produced by: Marc Abraham; Thomas Bliss; Kelli Konop
- Starring: Anne Judson-Yager; Bree Turner; Kevin Cooney; Faune A. Chambers; Bryce Johnson; Richard Lee Jackson; Bethany Joy Lenz (Note: Credited as Joie Lenz)
- Cinematography: Richard Crudo
- Edited by: Tony Lombardo
- Music by: Paul Haslinger
- Production companies: Beacon Pictures; Strike Entertainment
- Distributed by: Universal Studios Home Entertainment
- Release date: January 13, 2004
- Running time: 90 minutes
- Country: United States
- Language: English

Bring It On Again is a 2004 American direct-to-video teen sports comedy film directed by Damon Santostefano and written by Claudia Grazioso, Brian Gunn and Mark Gunn. It stars Anne Judson-Yager, Faune A. Chambers, Bree Turner, Bethany Joy Lenz and Richard Lee Jackson.

It is the second installment in the Bring It On film series. Although marketed as a sequel to Bring It On (2000), it features new characters and none of the original film's cast members. The film was released by Universal Pictures directly to home video on January 13, 2004.

== Plot ==
Whittier arrives at the fictional California State College, hoping to join the national champion varsity cheerleading team. She meets her friend from cheer camp, Monica, and they both put on impressive performances at tryouts. Head cheerleader Tina is ready to ask them to join the team, but fellow cheerleader Greg goes a step further, telling Tina that Whittier will be the next head cheerleader. This angers Tina's pal, Marni, who had the position staked out, but at Dean Sebastian's urging, Tina goes along with the plan and takes Whittier under her wing.

Whittier meets Derek, a campus D.J. who takes an immediate interest in her. Tina, who is demanding and controlling, warns Whittier against dating him. Monica objects to Tina's interference, but Whittier briefly prioritizes her cheerleading ambitions over her relationship with Derek, betraying his trust. Frustrated by Monica's defiant attitude, Tina punishes her, resulting in an injury. Tina then forces Whittier to choose between her friendship with Monica and her place on the squad. Fed up with Tina's controlling behavior, Whittier and Monice quit the cheerleading team. However, Whittier remains passionate about cheerleading.

With Monica's help, she gathers up the outcasts from the drama club, the dance club, and other groups that have lost their funding in favor of the cheerleading program, and forms a ragtag squad of her own, determined to battle the varsity squad for a spot at the national championship. The two teams end up competing for the spot at nationals, with Whittier's squad ultimately winning. Afterward, Whittier offers Tina a spot on her squad, a position Tina initially refuses but later wants. The film ends with Tina sucking up to Whittier and Monica, deciding she wants to be on their squad after all, while Marni throws a comical fit.

== Cast ==
- Anne Judson-Yager as Whittier Smith
- Faune A. Chambers as Monica Washington
- Bree Turner as Tina Hammersmith
- Bethany Joy Lenz as Marni Potts
- Richard Lee Jackson as Derek
- Bryce Johnson as Greg
- Felicia Day as Penelope Hope
- Dennis Hemphill Jr. as Francis
- Holly Towne as Janice
- Kevin Cooney as Principal Dean Sebastian
- Katherine Bailess as Colleen Lipman
- Chris Carmack as Todd
- Joshua Gomez as Sammy / team mascot
- Kelly Stables as Stinger teammate
- Brian Patrick Wade as Stinger teammate
- Darren Geare as Stinger teammate
- Jerry Trainor as Smug Guy

== Production ==
Tony Gonzales choreographed the film's cheerleading routines and supervised the performers' training. According to DVD Talk, the cast underwent a physically demanding training and rehearsal schedule. The DVD featurette You're on the Set of Bring It On Again contains footage from the auditions and training sessions, alongside interviews with director Damon Santostefano, producers Thomas Bliss and Kelli Konop, Gonzales and members of the cast.

Filming took place at the University of California, Los Angeles in August 2002, including the university's campus.

== Music ==
Paul Haslinger composed the film's original score. A cover of Pat Benatar's "Hit Me with Your Best Shot" accompanies the closing credits and outtakes. The song is also used in a special feature for the DVD's release.

== Release ==
Bring It On Again was released directly to DVD in the United States by Universal Studios Home Entertainment on January 13, 2004. The DVD presents the film in anamorphic widescreen with a Dolby Digital 5.1 soundtrack. The DVD included an alternate opening, deleted and alternate scenes, and featurettes.

The film was released on Blu-ray on July 10, 2018.

== Reception ==
Aaron Beierle of DVD Talk praised Turner's deliberately exaggerated performance and described Judson-Yager and Chambers as entertaining, but believed that the performances were undermined by the screenplay. He called the film a "thin sequel" and did not recommend the DVD. In a separate review for the website, Adam Tyner found the cast respectable but the screenplay unremarkable, describing the film as a "standard-issue light sports flick".

Heather Boerner of Common Sense Media offered a more positive assessment, writing that the film had "loveable characters, a good moral, and some good fun". She considered its message conventional but called it a worthy contribution to the girls' coming-of-age genre.

Reviewing its 2018 Blu-ray release, Martin Liebman considered the film "utterly unoriginal" and overly dependent on the structure of its predecessor. Nevertheless, he found it reasonably entertaining as an undemanding sports comedy and praised Judson-Yager's handling of the role's physical requirements.

== Legacy ==
In 2021, singer-songwriters Sufjan Stevens and Angelo De Augustine used the film as the inspiration for "Fictional California", a song from their collaborative album A Beginner's Mind. De Augustine defended their choice of source material, saying that the film "may not be classified as high art, but there's still something in it".
