= In Time =

2011 film by Andrew Niccol

- Theatrical release poster
- Directed by: Andrew Niccol
- Written by: Andrew Niccol
- Produced by: Andrew Niccol; Marc Abraham; Eric Newman
- Starring: Justin Timberlake; Amanda Seyfried; Cillian Murphy; Olivia Wilde; Alex Pettyfer
- Cinematography: Roger Deakins
- Edited by: Zach Staenberg
- Music by: Craig Armstrong
- Production companies: New Regency Productions; Strike Entertainment
- Distributed by: 20th Century Fox
- Release dates: October 20, 2011 (Westwood, Los Angeles); October 28, 2011 (United States)
- Running time: 109 minutes
- Country: United States
- Language: English
- Budget: $40 million
- Box office: $174 million

In Time is a 2011 American science fiction action film written, co-produced, and directed by Andrew Niccol. Justin Timberlake and Amanda Seyfried star as inhabitants of a dystopian future where time is its primary currency; each individual possesses a subdermal tattoo-like countdown digital clock on their left forearm that kills them when they 'time out'. Cillian Murphy, Vincent Kartheiser, Olivia Wilde, Matt Bomer, Johnny Galecki, and Alex Pettyfer costar. The film was released on October 28, 2011, and grossed $174 million against a $40 million budget. It received mixed reviews from critics, who praised the premise while criticizing its execution.

== Plot ==
In 2169, people are genetically engineered to stop aging on their 25th birthday, when a one-year countdown on their forearm begins. When it reaches zero, the person "times out" and dies instantly. Time has thus become the universal fiat currency, transferred directly between people or stored on flashdrive type devices, some in secure bank vaults. Distinct socioeconomic caste "Time Zones" exist; Dayton is the poorest, a manufacturing hub and "ghetto" where people rarely have over 24 hours on their clocks, whereas in New Greenwich, the affluent Zone of plutocrats, people have enough time to be essentially immortal.

Will Salas (Timberlake) is a 28-year-old Dayton factory worker who lives with his mother, Rachel. One night, he rescues a drunken 105-year-old Henry Hamilton from Fortis and his Minutemen gangsters, a group of time-robbing thugs. Hamilton, who has 116 years on his clock, reveals to Will that the people of New Greenwich hoard most of the time, while constantly increasing prices to impoverish people in less prosperous districts. The next morning, he transfers all but 5 minutes of his time to a sleeping Will, then times out before Will can stop him. Dayton-born Raymond Leon, the leader of police-like "Timekeepers", assumes Will robbed Hamilton.

Heeding his friend Borel's warning against possessing excess time in Dayton, Will donates 10 years (the length of their friendship) to him before departing, planning to relocate to New Greenwich with Rachel. However, that night, Rachel suddenly finds herself with insufficient bus fare to return to Dayton, having exhausted her earnings from two days' work in the Garment District to liquidate a two-day loan. The ambivalent driver advises her to run, but she arrives a few seconds too late for Will to rescue her and times out in his arms. The next morning, he furiously decides to avenge her death by visiting New Greenwich, internalizing Hamilton's words regarding the inequity of the Time System.

In New Greenwich, Will meets Philippe Weis, a time-loaning businessman, and his daughter Sylvia at a casino. While playing poker, Will nearly times out but eventually wins a millennium. Sylvia invites him to a party that night at her father's. Will then purchases a classic Jaguar E-Type convertible and drives it to the party. Will dances with Sylvia and convinces her to swim in the ocean, something that, out of fear, the rich never do. Timekeepers later arrive and detain Will, who claims his innocence in Hamilton's death. Rather than attempting to prove Will's guilt, Raymond simply confiscates all but two hours of Will's time, explaining it does not belong in Dayton.

Will escapes, taking Sylvia hostage and driving back to Dayton. Fortis's gang sets up a roadblock which causes Will to crash into a flood control channel, knocking them unconscious. The gang arrives and steals most of their time, leaving Will and Sylvia with only 30 minutes each. They abandon the wrecked car and visit Borel's residence to retrieve some spare time but his wife Greta tearfully explains that he has drunk himself to death. As their time is running out, the two obtain a day each by pawning Sylvia's diamond earrings. Will then calls Philippe to request a 1,000-year ransom to be paid into the time-mission for the desperate, releasing Sylvia anyway when he declines. Raymond encounters Will, but when Sylvia accidentally shoots him in the shoulder, Will transfers two hours to Raymond, allowing him to survive long enough for his squad to retrieve him, and purloins his car.

Now committed to crashing the system, Will and Sylvia rob Weis time banks, donating the extra capsules to the destitute, but soon realize that prices are simply increased to compensate for the extra time. Now criminals, they rent out an entire hotel to hide. Fortis's gang finds them, but Will successfully times out Fortis in a wrist wrestling match by using his deceased father's technique and kills his Minutemen. He and Sylvia then decide to rob Philippe's vault of a 1,000,000-year capsule. Raymond pursues them from New Greenwich to Dayton, but fails to stop them from distributing the stolen time. Having neglected to collect his per diem, he times out. Will and Sylvia nearly time out themselves, but survive by taking Raymond's salary.

Television reports show factories in Dayton shutting down as everyone abandons their jobs due to possessing sufficient time to sustain themselves. Having witnessed the consequences of Raymond's obsession with the pair, his colleague Jaeger orders the Timekeepers to return home. Will and Sylvia progress to larger banks, still attempting to level the system.

== Cast ==
- Justin Timberlake as Will Salas, factory worker, Rachel's 28-year-old son
- Amanda Seyfried as Sylvia Weis, banking heiress, Will's love interest
- Cillian Murphy as Raymond Leon, a "Timekeeper" police captain
- Vincent Kartheiser as Philippe Weis: Sylvia's banker father
- Olivia Wilde as Rachel Salas, garment factory worker, Will's 50-year-old mother
- Matt Bomer as Henry Hamilton, affluent but disenchanted 105 year old
- Johnny Galecki as Borel, Will's best friend and coworker
- Collins Pennie as Timekeeper Jaeger
- Alex Pettyfer as gangster Fortis
- Toby Hemingway as Timekeeper Kors
- Brendan Miller as Kolber
- Yaya DaCosta as Greta
- Ethan Peck as Constantin
- Rachel Roberts as Carrera
- August Emerson as Levi
- Sasha Pivovarova as Clara Weis: Sylvia's maternal grandmother
- Jesse Lee Soffer as Webb
- Bella Heathcote as Michele Weis: Sylvia's mother
- Melissa Ordway as Leila
- Jessica Parker Kennedy as Edouarda
- Jeff Staron as Oris
- Matt O'Leary as Moser
- Nick Lashaway as Ekman
- Ray Santiago as Victa
- Kris Lemche as Markus
- Laura Ashley Samuels as Sagita

== Production ==
Before the film was titled In Time, the names Now and I'm.mortal were used. In July 2010, both Amanda Seyfried and Justin Timberlake had been offered the lead roles, officially signing on at the end of the month. On August 9, 2010, Cillian Murphy was confirmed to have joined the cast.

The first photos from the set were revealed on October 28, 2010. 20th Century Fox and New Regency distributed the film, and Marc Abraham and Eric Newman's Strike Entertainment produced it.

In an interview with Kristopher Tapley of In Contention, Roger Deakins stated that he would be shooting the film in digital, which makes this the first film to be shot in digital by the veteran cinematographer.

The use of retrofuturism is one of many elements that the film shares with Niccol's earlier work, Gattaca; Niccol himself referred to it as "the bastard child of Gattaca".

== Copyright lawsuit ==
On September 15, 2011, a lawsuit was filed against the film by attorneys acting on behalf of science fiction author Harlan Ellison, author of the short story "'Repent, Harlequin!' Said the Ticktockman". The suit, naming New Regency, director Andrew Niccol and a number of anonymous John Does, appears to have based its claim on the similarity that both the completed film and Ellison's story concern a dystopian future in which people have a set amount of time to live which can be revoked, given certain pertaining circumstances by a recognized authority known as a Timekeeper. The suit initially demanded an injunction against the film's release but Ellison later altered it to instead ask for screen credit. He ultimately dropped the suit, with both sides releasing the following joint statement: "After seeing the film In Time, Harlan Ellison decided to voluntarily dismiss the Action. No payment or screen credit was promised or given to Harlan Ellison. The parties wish each other well, and have no further comment on the matter."

== Reception ==
=== Critical response ===
Review aggregator Rotten Tomatoes reports that 36% of 173 critics gave the film a positive review; the average rating is 5.30/10. The website's consensus reads, "In Time's intriguing premise and appealing cast are easily overpowered by the blunt, heavy-handed storytelling." Metacritic, which assigns a weighted average score out of 100 to reviews from mainstream critics, gives the film a score of 53 based on 36 reviews. CinemaScore polls reported that the average grade moviegoers gave the film was a "B-" on an A+ to F scale.

Roger Ebert of The Chicago Sun-Times gave the film a largely positive review with 3 stars out of 4, noting that the "premise is damnably intriguing" and praising Timberlake's performance, but also lamenting how "a great deal of this film has been assembled from standard elements".

Henry Barnes for The Guardian gave a mixed but favorable review, stating "[the film's political] allegory is clunky [yet] this is still a playful caper that ticks along on the strength of its cast."

In a review for The Atlantic, Noah Berlatsky argued the film was intended as a critique of capitalism but actually depicted economic inequality as "sexy" in its portrayal of a romance between a lower-class and upper-class character, and described the characters' bank robberies as the "hoariest of get-rich schemes" which operated within the capitalist system rather than dismantling it as the characters claimed.

Writing for Time magazine, Richard Corliss praised the premise but criticized Niccol's direction of the cast, writing how Niccol's "imagination is vigorously literary but not thrillingly cinematic", describing the film's second half as devolving into poorly executed action sequences.

Manohla Dargis gave the film a mixed review in The New York Times, comparing the story to the works of Philip K. Dick, as well as Niccol's earlier film Gattaca with the inclusion of the "master-slave dialectic" between the rich and the poor, like that of the genetically perfect and imperfect in Gattaca. Dargis also noted the appearance of Holocaust imagery, in which the poor remain lying where they die.

=== Box office ===
In Time grossed $12 million on its opening weekend, debuting at number three behind Puss in Boots, and Paranormal Activity 3. The film eventually grossed over $37.5 million in the US and $136.4 million internationally for a worldwide total of $173.9 million.

== See also ==
- The Price of Life
- Logan's Run
