= The Rundown =

2003 film by Peter Berg

- Theatrical release poster
- Directed by: Peter Berg
- Screenplay by: R.J. Stewart; James Vanderbilt
- Story by: R.J. Stewart
- Produced by: Marc Abraham; Bill Corless; Karen Glasser; Kevin Misher
- Starring: Dwayne Johnson; Seann William Scott; Christopher Walken; Rosario Dawson; Ewen Bremner
- Cinematography: Tobias A. Schliessler
- Edited by: Richard Pearson
- Music by: Harry Gregson-Williams
- Production companies: Universal Pictures; Columbia Pictures; Strike Entertainment; WWE Films
- Distributed by: Universal Pictures (United States, Canada and Japan); Columbia TriStar Film Distributors International (International)
- Release date: September 26, 2003
- Running time: 104 minutes
- Country: United States
- Language: English
- Budget: $85 million
- Box office: $80.9 million

The Rundown (known internationally as Welcome to the Jungle) is a 2003 American action comedy film directed by Peter Berg and written by James Vanderbilt and R.J. Stewart from a story by Stewart. It follows an aspiring chef working as a debt collector for a loan shark who is tasked with retrieving the loan shark's son, who went to Brazil to search for a lost artifact. The film stars Dwayne "The Rock" Johnson, Seann William Scott, Christopher Walken, and Rosario Dawson.

The film was released by Universal Pictures in the United States, Canada and Japan and by Columbia TriStar Film Distributors International under the Columbia Pictures label internationally on September 26, 2003. It received positive reviews but was a box office failure, grossing $80.9 million on an $85 million budget. Later retrospectives have generally been positive on the film.

== Plot ==
Beck is an aspiring chef who works as a debt collector for loan shark and bookie Billy Walker. He is sent to a nightclub to retrieve a championship ring from a football player, after which he is assaulted by one of Billy's other collectors. Angry, he tells Billy that he wants out of the business. Billy asks that he take one final job: retrieve Billy's son, Travis, from a mining town in Brazil, for which Beck will be given enough money to open his own restaurant. He accepts and leaves for Brazil.

Arriving in the town of El Dorado, Beck meets Cornelius Hatcher, who runs the town's mining operation. Hatcher charges Beck ten thousand dollars for his permission to take Travis home, but reneges after he finds out Travis has discovered a lost golden artifact known as O Gato do Diablo (the Devil's Cat). Hatcher and his men confront Beck in the local bar, but he fends them off and leaves with Travis. On the way back to the airfield, Travis forces the pair's Jeep off the road and into the jungle. He attempts to escape but is recaptured by Beck. After an unfortunate encounter with some monkeys, the two find themselves in the camp of a local rebel movement.

Travis convinces the rebels that Beck works for Hatcher and was sent to kill them all. Beck gains the upper hand in the ensuing fight before the rebel leader Mariana, whom Beck met earlier at the bar, intervenes. She wants the Gato so it can be used to ensure that the locals can free themselves from Hatcher, but Hatcher and his men attack the camp and kill many rebels. Beck, Travis, and Mariana escape, and Beck makes Mariana a deal: she helps him get Travis to the airfield in exchange for the Gato. Travis leads them to a cave behind a waterfall where the Gato is located. They retrieve it and begin the journey back.

On the way back, Mariana chastises Travis for wanting to sell the artifact, but he argues that he wants to give it to a museum. She gives Beck and Travis a toxic fruit that temporarily paralyzes them, tells Beck which direction the airfield is, and leaves them with a campfire to keep the animals away. After regaining the ability to move, Beck hauls Travis to the airfield. The local pilot, Declan, tells Beck that Mariana was captured by Hatcher. Travis pleads with Beck to help her, and the two head into town to rescue her.

Using a cow stampede for cover, Beck and Travis begin their assault on Hatcher's men. Travis becomes trapped by gunfire in a bus, and Beck saves him before it explodes. Hatcher tells his brother Harvey to flee with Mariana and the Gato, but they are stopped by Travis. Hatcher confronts Beck, who offers him the chance to leave town, which Hatcher refuses. After he is shot by the townspeople, Hatcher agrees to leave but dies from his wounds. Travis gives the Gato to Mariana before leaving with Beck, who tells him that he must still return Travis to the United States.

Back in L.A., Travis is delivered to Billy, who verbally and physically abuses him. Beck asks to celebrate with them and gives Billy and his men the same fruit Mariana used on him and Travis. As everyone else is temporarily paralyzed, Beck uncuffs Travis, and the two leave together.

== Cast ==
- Dwayne Johnson as Beck, a skilled bounty hunter and aspiring chef who works for Billy and reluctantly agrees to retrieve Travis, the former's estranged son
- Seann William Scott as Travis Walker, a fast-talking treasure hunter who is searching El Dorado for a lost artifact "El Gato de Diablo" and Billy's estranged son
- Rosario Dawson as Mariana, the town bartender who is also the secret leader of the local resistance against Cornelius
- Christopher Walken as Cornelius Bernard Hatcher, the owner of the mining operation and founder of the town of El Dorado
- Ewen Bremner as Declan, the Scottish pilot who aids Beck
- Jon Gries as Harvey Hatcher, Cornelius' younger brother and main enforcer
- William Lucking as Billy Walker, Travis's father, a loan shark and bookie who uses Beck to collect debts
- Stephen Bishop as Knappmiller, a football player who owes Billy money from gambling debts
- Ernie Reyes Jr. as Manito, a resistance fighter who engages Beck in a prolonged fight using his skill in capoeira
- Stuart F. Wilson as Swenson
- Dennis Keiffer as Naylor
- Garrett Warren as Henshaw
- Jamal Duff as Jamal
- Jeff Chase as Kambui

Arnold Schwarzenegger makes an uncredited cameo appearance as a bar patron who tells Beck "have fun".

== Production ==
The movie was originally called Helldorado. It was offered to director Peter Berg, who had only made one film, Very Bad Things. Looking for inspiration on how to do it, Berg bought a DVD titled The 50 Best Fights Ever Filmed, which at first demotivated him: "I just thought, 'Good God, it's all been done and it's all been done so well, probably with more money than I'm going to have. What am I going to do?'" He then saw the fight between Roddy Piper and Keith David in They Live, about which he said, "It just hurt watching it. It was a completely different style from all these sexy and sleek movies. And thinking about it, I couldn't remember the last time in a movie fight where I felt the pain, where if you got hit in the face, it hurt. So that's where I found my breathing room: let's give people old-school guys slugging it out with big punches." Producer Kevin Misher described the film as "Indiana Jones and the Lost Ark meets Romancing the Stone with a little bit of Midnight Run".

Dwayne Johnson, who was credited under his ring name The Rock, was paid $12.5 million for his role. Berg said of his performance, "This movie could have been a dark, vicious action thriller. But the fact that it's playful and funny is a tribute to The Rock. He's a charming, charismatic and very smart man."

Berg and Misher were held up by armed robbers in Brazil in June 2002 while scouting locations, prompting them to film in Hawaii instead. Shooting began in September 2002, with Seann William Scott later stating "we just basically made up as we went along". One scene on Oahu involved Johnson and Scott falling down the side of a mountain. Berg said, "The goal was to put the biggest fall down a hill in a movie that people have ever seen. The big inspiration was the old Wide World of Sports—'and the agony of defeat'—and wondering what would have happened if that poor bastard on the ski slope had had a few more stages to go." Johnson's regular stuntman refused to do the stunt, so they hired "a guy who has a reputation for just doing anything" who was knocked out the first time.

Arnold Schwarzenegger has a cameo in the film. He visited Universal Studios during the shoot and was having lunch with Johnson when Berg asked if he would like to appear in the film, and Schwarzenegger agreed if they could do it immediately. His cameo as a bar patron who passes by Johnson's character and simply tells him to "have fun" is widely regarded as a veiled reference to the fact that Johnson's career as a Hollywood action star was just beginning as Schwarzenegger's was winding down.

== Reception ==
=== Box office ===
Despite the positive reviews, The Rundown was a significant box office failure, grossing just under $81 million worldwide compared to its $85 million budget, which makes a sequel not entirely likely. Director Peter Berg has expressed interest in making a sequel to the film but notes that "no one can ever get motivated and focused enough to do it."

=== Critical response ===
On the review aggregator website Rotten Tomatoes, The Rundown holds an approval rating of 69% based on 150 reviews, with an average rating of 6.4/10. The website's critical consensus states, "The Rundown doesn't break any new ground, but it's a smart, funny buddy action picture with terrific comic chemistry between Dwayne 'The Rock' Johnson and Seann William Scott." At Metacritic, the film has a weighted average score of 59 out of 100 based on 36 critics, indicating "mixed or average reviews". Audiences polled by CinemaScore gave the film an average grade of "A-" on an A+ to F scale.

Roger Ebert of the Chicago Sun-Times gave the film 3 1/2 stars out of 4, saying "The jungle locations give the film a texture and beauty that underlines the out-sized characters."

== Potential sequel ==
In December 2009, Berg acknowledged that discussions for a sequel had begun shortly after the film's release and were still ongoing. He cited scheduling conflicts as to why the project had not yet been green-lit. Johnson corroborated this in November 2010, stating that he and Berg "are always discussing options" for a sequel; he said that the pair are also in negotiations with Universal Pictures, and expressed confidence that the sequel will be made if a good enough script is written.

Berg announced in December 2013 that he was officially developing a sequel, confirming that Johnson was still interested while Scott would not return. A number of undisclosed screenwriters were hired for the project. By September 2016, Berg stated that the sequel had been written with Kevin Hart in mind as the co-star due to his recent work as Johnson's co-star in multiple successful films, while also stating that he would alternatively consider making the film with Jonah Hill in the role. Johnson publicly confirmed his involvement with the project while proposing HellDorado (the first film's working title) as a possible title. The pair asked fans to campaign for Hill to sign on as his co-star.

In August 2018, Berg revealed that the current draft of the script included a story that took place in Alaska with a comedic scene involving walruses, similar to the scene with baboons from the first movie. Acknowledging that Johnson had expressed disinterest in Alaska, Berg stated that a new draft is being written with a less frigid location. Berg said in September 2020 that development for a sequel is ongoing, citing Johnson's busy production schedule as one of the reasons it has not yet been made and admitting that they are currently "rethink[ing] the script".

== See also ==
- List of American films of 2003
- Dwayne Johnson filmography
- Arnold Schwarzenegger filmography
