= Marc Abraham =

American film director

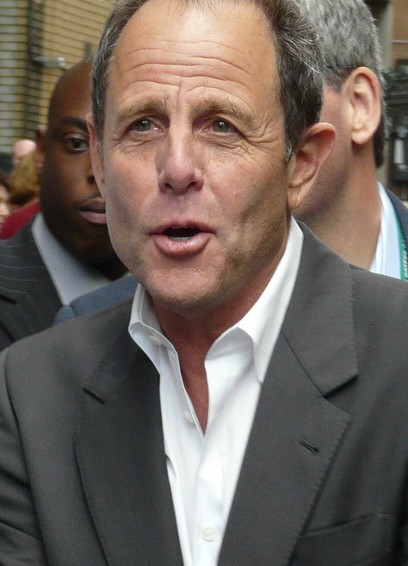
- Abraham at the Flash of Genius film premiere in September 2008
- Occupations: Producer; Director; Former President of Strike Entertainment

Marc Abraham is an American film producer, director, and former president of Strike Entertainment, a production company he launched in early 2002 with a multi-year, first look arrangement with Universal Pictures.

== Career ==
Abraham began his career as a copywriter for Young & Rubicam in New York City after graduating from the University of Virginia. He left advertising to pursue a full-time writing career and worked as a freelance sportswriter for several newspapers and magazines. He also wrote two books on the International Olympic Games for Universal Press.

Abraham's entry into film began with the documentary, Playing to Win, an inside look at the Cuban athletic system. He wrote several screenplays for studios and networks including 20th Century Fox, Warner Bros. and CBS. He also wrote for the popular series 21 Jump Street and Moonlighting.

He was a founding partner, along with Armyan Bernstein, at Beacon Communications, a financing and production company founded in 1990.

Abraham brought to the big screen Flash of Genius, released by Universal Pictures in Fall 2008, which marked his directorial debut and stars Greg Kinnear and Lauren Graham. Based on a true story, the movie tells the story of a small-time inventor who takes on the Detroit automakers. Also for Universal Pictures, Abraham is producing Trouble is My Business, an adaptation of Raymond Chandler's detective-noir classic, starring Clive Owen. He produced the remake of The Thing for Strike Entertainment alongside Eric Newman.

Even with the disestablishment of Strike Entertainment in 2013, Abraham and Newman still produced the 2014 film RoboCop under the Strike Entertainment name since it started production in 2012.

Abraham directed, wrote and produced the 2015 Hank Williams biopic I Saw the Light, which starred Tom Hiddleston. It was based on Colin Escott's 1994 book Hank Williams: The Biography.

=== Beacon Pictures ===
During its first few years, Beacon Communications produced award-winning films like The Commitments which was nominated for a Golden Globe Award for Best Motion Picture – Musical or Comedy in 1992 and also went on to win four BAFTA awards; and Keith Gordon's A Midnight Clear, starring Ethan Hawke.

In a co-venture with Turner Pictures, Abraham executive produced David Mamet's A Life in the Theatre. Beacon also produced Sugar Hill, starring Wesley Snipes; Princess Caraboo, starring Phoebe Cates and Kevin Kline; The Road to Wellville, directed by Alan Parker and starring Anthony Hopkins; and The Baby-Sitters Club, based on the best-selling series of books from Scholastic.

=== Strike Entertainment ===
Abraham and fellow producers Thomas Bliss and Eric Newman founded Strike Entertainment in 2002. They produced such films as Children of Men, The Rundown (2003), Slither (2006), Flash of Genius (2008), The Thing (2011), and RoboCop (2014) under Strike's production name.

In March 2013, Abraham, Bliss and Newman dissolved Strike Entertainment after 11 years as a Universal-based production company. The Universal first-look deal dissolved the company is Spring 2013, which marked the end of a 15-year tenure at the studio for Abraham, Bliss and Newman. Abraham and Newman said the partnership simply ran its course and that the parting is amicable. They will continue to work together on a projects they still have percolating under the Strike banner.

== Awards and affiliations ==
Abraham is a member of the Writer's Guild, the Producer's Guild, and on the board of the Virginia Film Festival and the Violence Policy Center. He has been honored with the Spirit of Chrysalis Award, which recognized Abraham for his outstanding commitment to helping change lives through jobs, and helping thousands of disadvantaged and homeless individuals and families in Los Angeles.

== Filmography ==
He was a producer in all films unless otherwise noted.

=== Film ===
As producer

- The Commitments (1991) (co-producer)
- A Thousand Acres (1997)
- Playing God (1997)
- Trippin' (1999)
- Bring It On (2000)
- The Family Man (2000)
- Spy Game (2001)
- Tuck Everlasting (2002)
- The Emperor's Club (2002)
- The Rundown (2003)
- Bring It On Again (2004) (Direct-to-video)
- Dawn of the Dead (2004)
- Children of Men (2006)
- Let's Go to Prison (2006)
- The Last Exorcism (2010)
- The Thing (2011)
- In Time (2011)
- The Man with the Iron Fists (2012)
- The Last Exorcism Part II (2013)
- RoboCop (2014)
- The Man with the Iron Fists 2 (2015) (Direct-to-video)
- I Saw the Light (2015)
- Trouble Is My Business (TBA)

As executive producer

- A Midnight Clear (1992)
- Sugar Hill (1993)
- Princess Caraboo (1994)
- The Road to Wellville (1994)
- The Baby-Sitters Club (1995)
- Air Force One (1997)
- For Love of the Game (1999)
- The Hurricane (1999)
- End of Days (1999)
- Thirteen Days (2000)
- Slither (2006)

As writer

Year	Film
2015	I Saw the Light

As director

Year	Film
2008	Flash of Genius
2015	I Saw the Light

As an actor

Year	Film	Role
1999	Trippin'	'Mission Life' Speaker
2002	Red Dragon	Dinner Guest

Soundtrack

Year	Film	Role
2015	I Saw the Light	Writer: "Even Though You Let Me Go"

=== Television ===
Year	Title	Credit	Notes
1993	A Life in the Theatre	Executive producer	Television film
2005	Untitled David Diamond / David Weissman Project		Television film

As writer

Year	Title	Notes
1989	21 Jump Street	
1989	Moonlighting	
1990	The Earth Day Special	Television special
