= Strike Entertainment =

American film company

- Industry: Film production
- Founded: 2002; 24 years ago
- Founder: Marc Abraham; Thomas Bliss; Eric Newman
- Defunct: 2013; 13 years ago
- Headquarters: United States

Strike Entertainment was a short-lived American production company founded in 2002 by Marc Abraham, Thomas Bliss and Eric Newman. Strike's films were distributed through Universal Pictures as well as various other majors. Its first film produced was The Rundown starring The Rock. The company was dissolved in March 2013.

== Company history ==
In May 2002, producer Marc Abraham, Beacon COO Thomas Bliss and senior VP of development Eric Newman broke away from their previous partner, Beacon Pictures, to set up Strike Entertainment, with a deal at Universal Pictures, who financed the company along with foreign partnerships.

In March 2013, Abraham, Bliss and Newman dissolved the company after 11 years as a Universal-based production company. The Universal first-look deal ended in Spring 2013, which marked the end of a 15-year tenure at the studio for Abraham and Newman. Abraham and Newman said the partnership had simply run its course and that the parting was amicable. They continued to work together on a project they still had percolating under the Strike banner.

== Filmography ==
- The Rundown (2003)
- Bring It On Again (2004)
- Dawn of the Dead (2004)
- Slither (2006)
- Children of Men (2006)
- Let's Go to Prison (2006)
- Flash of Genius (2008)
- The Last Exorcism (2010)
- The Thing (2011)
- In Time (2011)
- The Man with the Iron Fists (2012)
- The Last Exorcism Part II (2013)
- RoboCop (2014)
- The Man with the Iron Fists 2 (2015)
