= Playing God (1997 film) =

- Theatrical release poster
- Directed by: Andy Wilson
- Written by: Mark Haskell Smith
- Produced by: Marc Abraham; Laura Bickford; Thomas Bliss
- Starring: David Duchovny; Timothy Hutton; Angelina Jolie
- Cinematography: Anthony B. Richmond
- Edited by: Louise Rubacky
- Music by: Richard Hartley
- Production companies: Touchstone Pictures; Beacon Pictures
- Distributed by: Buena Vista Pictures Distribution (United States and United Kingdom); MDP Worldwide (Overseas)
- Release date: October 17, 1997
- Running time: 94 minutes
- Country: United States
- Language: English
- Budget: $12 million
- Box office: $4,166,918

Playing God is a 1997 American dramatic crime thriller film directed by Andy Wilson and written by Mark Haskell Smith. It stars David Duchovny (in his first starring role after achieving success with The X-Files), Timothy Hutton, and Angelina Jolie. Playing God was released by Buena Vista Pictures Distribution on October 17, 1997 in the United States and United Kingdom and by MDP Worldwide in other territories. The film received negative reviews from critics and underperformed at the box office.

== Plot ==
Dr. Eugene Sands, a surgeon whose medical license was revoked ten months prior for losing a patient while under the influence of amphetamines and opiates, makes yet another mistake in an L.A. bar after buying fentanyl citrate (synthetic heroin). He does "one good deed" that starts a chain of events that changes his life forever. Russian thugs enter and shoot Isaac, who's next to Eugene at the bar. Claire tells the bartender to call her boyfriend, Raymond Blossom, but Eugene, with Claire's assistance, saves Isaac's life using an emergency procedure to inflate his collapsed lung.

Eugene gets high at home. Yates and Cyril abduct and take him to Mr. Blossom, who gives Eugene $10,000, with a promise of more if he becomes his personal physician, and treat his criminal accomplices to avoid hospitals and police. FBI Agent Thomas Gage tells Casey about Blossom's retail merchandise counterfeiting, surveilling them at a Lakers game, meeting Russian gangster client Vladimir and his henchman Andrei. At a Bulgarian go-go bar, Eugene dances with Claire, while Vladimir warns that Dimitri knows Raymond also deals with Chinese clients. Meanwhile, Cyril assassinates the Russian thug who shot Isaac. Retaliating, Vlad raids Raymond's warehouse, killing several people. Cyril shoots Vlad in the abdomen. Raymond offers, "I can make you a doctor again." After protesting, Eugene operates, saving Vlad. Threatened, Vlad reveals where Raymond's merchandise is, after which Raymond kills Vlad.

Raymond and Eugene race vintage Porsches and party in the desert, while discussing business with China, but Claire warns Raymond about trusting Eugene. Raymond sends him on another call, but the boy is already dead. His tweaked-out psychopathic accomplice Flick threatens Eugene at gunpoint, "Fix him!" Flick relents and argues with Perry about the body.

Eugene, tired of being threatened, packs to run as Gage arrives. Eugene attacks Gage, thinking Raymond sent him for another emergency call. Gage shows his FBI badge, and Eugene's drugs that he found, "Looks like ten years...mandatory...another five, maybe eight," for unlicensed medical practice, plus tax evasion and consorting with known criminals. Gage blackmails him to help "nail" both Blossom and a Chinese national with diplomatic immunity, revealing he already has "one of Ray's people" working for him. He wants Eugene as a "material witness," revealing Raymond shot Vlad after surgery.

A Russian thug kills Yates, and Dimitri shoots Claire. Cyril arrives and kills all three Russians. While tending to Claire, Eugene finds her wire, hides it, injects a sedative and claims she died. Distraught, Raymond has Cyril drive Eugene away to kill him, but Eugene grabs the gun while Claire stabs Cyril. Eugene treats Claire at Sierra Inn bar, assisted by barmaid Susan, and patrons Jerry and Jim.

They hide out a few days at Eugene's family summer house. Raymond hires Flick and Perry to "clean house." He calls Gage to get "his girl" back, even if she's dead. Gage agrees, in exchange for Raymond wearing a wire for a sting operation against the Chinese, using pirated Silicon Valley software. Meanwhile, Eugene goes through detox withdrawal, explaining to Claire how his addiction began. Digiacomo and Casey arrive with Gage, who sends Claire back to convince Raymond nothing has changed. At Eugene's safe house, Flick and Perry burst in with shotguns, killing one FBI agent, wounding another who kills Perry. After Flick kills the last agent, Eugene pretends to treat Perry to get Flick's shotgun, forcing him to reveal Raymond and Claire's location.

Eugene infiltrates the building where Raymond takes Claire to meet with Mr. Ksi, Raymond revealing he knows Claire and Eugene killed Cyril. Suspicious, Mr. Ksi cancels the deal, and Blossom kills Ksi after seeing Eugene coming for Claire. Raymond escapes, playing three-card monte with Land Rovers, while Eugene chases in an El Camino. Stopped on the bridge, Raymond tries to shoot Eugene, who rams the door, knocking his gun way. Eugene aims the shotgun while Claire gets into his El Camino. Raymond goes for his dropped gun, and is hit by a Corvette. Eugene treats him. Raymond, "You're gonna save me?" Eugene, "I can't do that, Ray. I'm only a doctor." Raymond gets life in a state correctional facility. Eugene and Claire try to get their own lives back together.

== Cast ==
- David Duchovny as Dr. Eugene Sands
- Timothy Hutton as Raymond Blossom
- Angelina Jolie as Claire
- Michael Massee as Gage
- Peter Stormare as Vladimir
- Gary Dourdan as Yates
- John Hawkes as Flick
- Andrew Tiernan as Cyril
- Philip Moon as Casey
- Tracey Walter as Jim
- Pavel D. Lynchnikoff as Andrei
- Keone Young as Mr. Ksi
- Eric DaRe as Digiacomo
- Gareth Williams as Phelps
- Stacey Travis as Nurse
- Ross Kettle as Resident Surgeon
- John Roselius as Surgeon #1
- Dan Hildebrand as Russian Thug
- Alex Désert as Bartender
- Stella Garcia as S. African Businesswoman
- Guy Siner as Dutch Businessman

== Production ==
Its release was delayed due to initial negative reactions from test audiences. The film's trailer contained a brief glimpse of a sex scene between Duchovny and Jolie. Jolie later confirmed that she had filmed two sex scenes for the movie, but were edited out of the final cut.

== Music ==
The song "Spybreak!" by Propellerheads was used in this film two years before its stardom debut as the main song of the blockbuster movie The Matrix (1999).

== Reception ==
The film did not fare well financially or with critics. On the review aggregation website Rotten Tomatoes it scored 16% based on reviews from 31 critics, and it grossed $4,166,918 at the North American box office. Roger Ebert of the Chicago Sun-Times gave the film three stars out of four, saying: "This may not be a great movie, but for both Duchovny and Hutton, it's a turning point", citing Duchovny's ability to "stand above the action" like Clint Eastwood; and Hutton's ability to create a real character as the villain, instead of merely filling a space.

In an interview with the New York Times, Duchovny discussed production difficulties, and stated that "Playing God was a mistake only because we didn't have a script ready... I should have just bailed out, but I didn't know."
