= Dawn of the Dead (2004 film) =

2004 film by Zack Snyder

- Theatrical release poster
- Directed by: Zack Snyder
- Screenplay by: James Gunn
- Based on: Dawn of the Dead by George A. Romero
- Produced by: Richard P. Rubinstein; Marc Abraham; Eric Newman
- Starring: Sarah Polley; Ving Rhames; Jake Weber; Mekhi Phifer
- Cinematography: Matthew F. Leonetti
- Edited by: Niven Howie
- Music by: Tyler Bates
- Production companies: Universal Pictures; Strike Entertainment; New Amsterdam Entertainment
- Distributed by: Universal Pictures
- Release date: March 19, 2004
- Running time: 100 minutes
- Countries: France; Japan; United States
- Language: English
- Budget: $26 million
- Box office: $102.3 million

Dawn of the Dead is a 2004 action horror film directed by Zack Snyder, in his feature directorial debut, from a screenplay by James Gunn. A remake of George A. Romero's 1978 film of the same name, the film features an ensemble cast that includes Sarah Polley, Ving Rhames, Jake Weber, and Mekhi Phifer, with Scott Reiniger, Tom Savini, and Ken Foree from the original film appearing in cameos. Set in Milwaukee, its plot follows a group of survivors who try to survive a zombie apocalypse while holed up in a suburban shopping mall. It’s an international co-production between France, Japan and the United States.

Producers Eric Newman and Marc Abraham developed the film rather as a "re-envisioning" of the original Dawn of the Dead, aiming to reinvigorate the zombie genre for modern audiences. They bought the rights from co-producer Richard P. Rubinstein (who produced the original) and hired Gunn to write the script, which oriented the original's premise around the action genre. Intent on making the remake a straight horror, Snyder took over to direct to keep every aspect of the production as grounded in reality as possible. Filming took place from June to September 2003, on location at a Toronto shopping mall that was slated for demolition. The special makeup effects were created by David LeRoy Anderson, and the music was composed by Tyler Bates in his first collaboration with Snyder.

Dawn of the Dead was theatrically released on March 19, 2004, by Universal Pictures. Despite Romero's distaste for it, the film earned generally positive reviews from critics, who found improvements over the original in terms of acting, production values, and scares, even though they felt it lacked character development, was excessively gory, and indifferent to Romero's preoccupation with American consumerism. The film was a commercial success, grossing $102.3 million worldwide on a $26 million budget. Retrospective reviews have called it Snyder's best film, and it has made several lists of the best horror and zombie films. A spiritual successor, Army of the Dead, was released in 2021.

== Plot ==
After completing a nursing shift in the Milwaukee area, Ana returns home to her husband, Luis. Because they are distracted during the evening, they miss emergency news reports. The next morning, Vivian, a zombified neighbor girl enters their bedroom and kills Luis. He quickly reanimates and attacks Ana, who escapes through the chaotic neighborhood, crashes her car, and loses consciousness.

When she wakes, Ana joins police sergeant Kenneth Hall, electronics salesman Michael, and Andre, a criminal, with his pregnant wife, Luda. They enter a nearby shopping mall, where an infected security guard attacks them. Three uninfected guards, C.J., Bart, and Terry, disarm them but allow them to stay. After securing the mall, the group sees another survivor, Andy, trapped in his gun store across the parking lot. They also spot a military helicopter but fail to attract the pilot's attention.

The next day, a truck carrying survivors reaches the mall while pursued by zombies. Although C.J. and Bart want to refuse them entry, the others intervene. The newcomers consist of Norma, Steve, Tucker, Monica, Glen, Frank, and Frank's daughter, Nicole, plus a gravely ill woman who dies, reanimates, and is killed. The group realizes that bites spread the infection. Frank, who has been bitten, isolates himself; after he turns, Kenneth shoots him. Andre then goes to Luda, who has hidden a scratch wound.

As weeks pass, Kenneth and Andy begin communicating by whiteboard, while Ana grows closer to Michael and Nicole bonds with Terry. When the power fails, C.J., Bart, Michael, and Kenneth go to the parking garage to restore the emergency generator and discover a breach, signaled by a friendly dog named Chips. Zombies kill Bart, and the others set them on fire. Elsewhere, Luda, restrained by Andre, dies during childbirth and reanimates. Norma kills her, leading to a gunfight in which both Norma and Andre die. The others find and kill the zombie infant. The survivors then decide to reach a marina, take Steve's yacht, and sail to an island on Lake Michigan. They reinforce two shuttle buses for the escape.

To send supplies to Andy, who has begun starving, the group lowers Chips into the parking lot with provisions strapped to his body. The dog reaches the store, but a zombie enters through the dog door. Nicole crashes a truck into the store to retrieve Chips, but is trapped by the now-infected Andy. Kenneth, Michael, Tucker, Terry, and C.J. reach the store through the sewers, kill Andy, rescue Nicole, and collect ammunition. On the way back, Tucker breaks both legs, and C.J. kills him at his request. When the group cannot secure the mall doors, they evacuate.

During the drive to the marina, Glen accidentally kills Monica with a chainsaw, and the resulting crash kills him as well. Steve tries to abandon the others but is killed by a hidden zombie. Ana kills the reanimated Steve and takes his boat keys. At the marina, C.J. stays behind so the others can escape. Michael reveals that he has been bitten and kills himself, while Ana, Kenneth, Nicole, Terry, and Chips leave on the yacht. The film ends with camcorder footage showing the group running out of supplies, reaching an island, and being overwhelmed by countless zombies. (Note: In March 2024, James Gunn was asked by a fan on Threads what really happened to the survivors at the end of the film, and he simply replied, "What survivors?")

== Cast ==
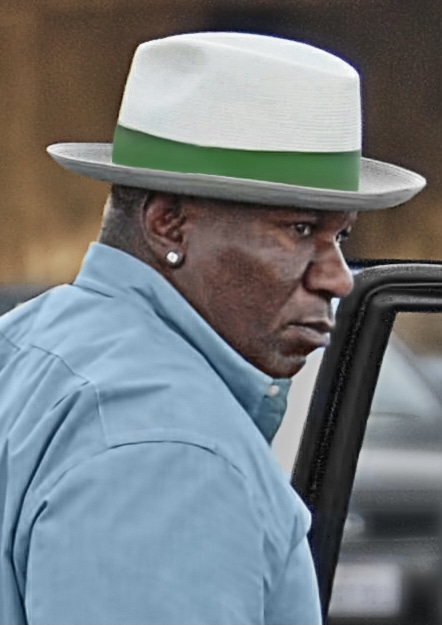
Ving Rhames, seen here in 2010, portrayed Sergeant Kenneth Hall

- Sarah Polley as Ana, a married nurse. Polley, who was the first choice for Ana, agreed to take the role because she saw it as an unusual departure from the stereotypical portrayal of female characters, considering it to be "anything more than somebody screaming and running away"; as such, she admired Ana's resilience in the face of adversity.
- Ving Rhames as Kenneth, a police officer and former Marine. Rhames said he was sold on the project due to the diversity of the cast as well as director Zack Snyder's track record of "[saying] a lot with the camera without dialogue"; he also jokingly stated, "I want to be in this movie because the black guy lives."
- Jake Weber as Michael, a television salesman. Weber described his character as an "everyman" suffering from an existential crisis after his divorce and the loss of his child, but later finds his identity as a skilled zombie killer. Dawn of the Dead was Weber's second horror film after Wendigo in 2001, as well as his first studio film in which he played a central role.
- Ty Burrell as Steve, a flippant, snarky and annoyingly foolish businessman. Burrell auditioned for the role of Michael the same day Weber auditioned for Steve. Describing his character as a "totally nihilistic jerk", Burrell found his role to be appropriate for him because he was "too flawed and too scared of a person" to effectively portray the ideal leading man required of Weber's role.
- Mekhi Phifer as Andre, a "streetwise" expectant father. Phifer agreed to be in the film because he was "intrigued" by its script, whose quality he described set it apart from B movies laden with "terrible acting, silly situations, [and] chicks running around with their boobs out".
- Michael Kelly as CJ, a tyrannical mall security guard who is subsequently overthrown. The character is noted as having been given an arc that centers on redemption.
- Kevin Zegers as Terry, the junior mall security guard
- Lindy Booth as Nicole, a young woman and Terry's eventual love interest
- Jayne Eastwood as Norma, a middle-aged female truck driver
- Matt Frewer as Frank, Nicole's father

In addition, Inna Korobkina portrays Luda, Andre's pregnant wife, while Scott Reiniger, Tom Savini, and Ken Foree – who were in the original film – make cameo appearances as a general, sheriff, and televangelist, respectively.

== Production ==
=== Development ===
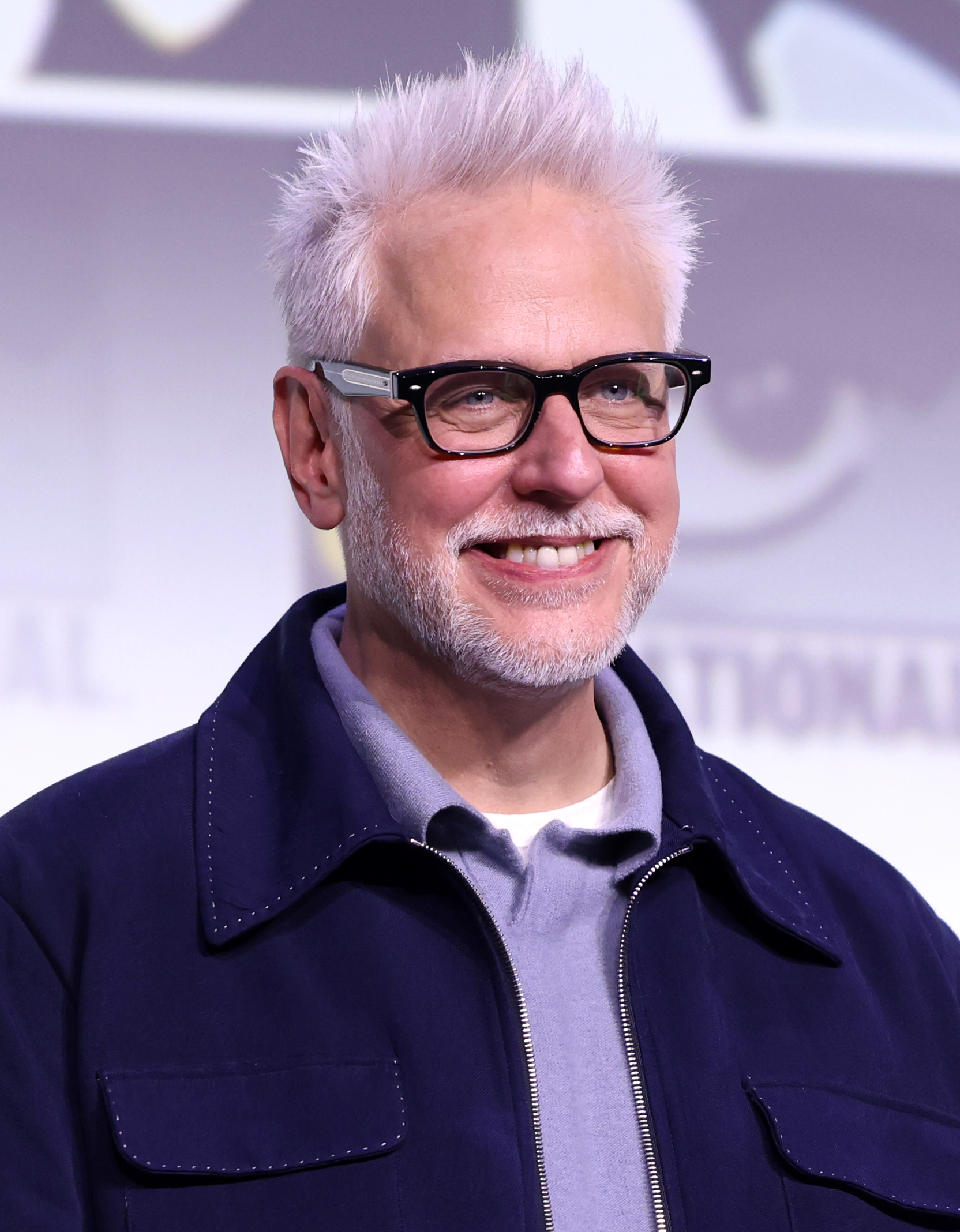
James Gunn (pictured here at the 2025 San Diego Comic-Con) agreed to write the script for Dawn of the Dead due to his love of the original film and zombie films in general.

Plans to remake 1978's Dawn of the Dead were conceived by producer Eric Newman, a fan of zombie films who cited the George A. Romero horror film as the best in this genre. With the remake, Newman and producer Marc Abraham wanted to reinvigorate the zombie genre for modern audiences as well as "make the old fans happy and make a lot of new fans". Newman and Abraham bought the rights to Dawn of the Dead from its producer and rights holder Richard P. Rubinstein, who was reluctant at first as he was "concerned that somewhere along the way a studio would sanitize Newman's vision for producing a version with 'attitude'", but that it was "Marc Abraham's long track record in keeping the creative integrity of the studio distributed films he has produced intact that gave me reason to say 'yes'". Newman hired James Gunn to write the script, and the studio brought Gunn in despite not wanting to deliver them a signal idea for the film beforehand. A fan of the original Dawn of the Dead since he was a young boy, Gunn explained that he took the job because he "kind of saw generally what it could be".

The producers conceptualized the remake as more of a "re-envisioning" which would work in some references to the original but would primarily work on its own terms. Co-producer Eric Newman cited Invasion of the Body Snatchers (1978), The Thing (1982), and The Fly (1986) as influences on the remake, considering these to be "amazing updates" as well as "great movies that add to rather than diminish the original films". By way of respect to Romero's film, the producers cast the original's Tom Savini, Scott Reiniger, and Ken Foree in cameos; and incorporated visual references to Gaylen Ross and James A. Baffico. (Note: The clothing store "Gaylen Ross" is a reference to the eponymous actress, while "Wooley's Diner" is named after James Baffico's character in the original, Wooley.)

In writing the script, Gunn took an action-oriented approach while remaining faithful to the basic premise of Romero's version. To develop the plot, he declined to write a treatment in favor of a discovery writing method whereby he would devise hypothetical situations which would ultimately force the characters to evacuate the mall. Gunn decided to leave the origin of the zombie outbreak ambiguous, believing this would give not only equal consideration to each audience's viewpoint (scientific or otherwise) but also something to think about what they would do if they found themselves in a similar situation. The script was given uncredited rewrites by Michael Tolkin and Scott Frank; co-producer Richard P. Rubinstein said Tolkin further developed the characters while Frank provided some of the bigger, upbeat action scenes. Gunn revealed he received internet backlash over the film due to his past screenwriting credit on Scooby-Doo (2002), believing him to be unqualified for the job. However, film critic Harry Knowles, initially an opponent of the remake, read Gunn's script and gave it a positive response on his website Ain't It Cool News, which Gunn said helped eliminate doubts cast upon him by fans of the original.

==== Theme ====
With Dawn of the Dead, Gunn wanted to explore the human condition as well as tell a wholly different story about redemption. He elaborated on the redemptive theme of the film in an interview with IGN during a press junket for Scooby-Doo 2: Monsters Unleashed released that same year:

[...] Dawn of the Dead is about redemption because it's about a bunch of people who have lived certain lives, who have maybe not been the best people, and suddenly they have everything that they've used to define themselves: Their careers, their churches, their jobs, their families are stripped away. They're gone. They start at nothing and they have to become who they really are in the face of all that and some of the people are redeemed and end up becoming good people and some of them are not redeemed and they end up, you know, not redeemed. And that's what kind of drove me throughout the story, was it was a story about redemption. I also think that there's a lot about how people survive and what people turn to in the face of such tragedy. The tragedy in this case being flesh-eating zombies. And really it's a group coming together to work as a community who wouldn't otherwise work together. So there is that foundation of love, that basic message, within even Dawn of the Dead...

=== Pre-production ===
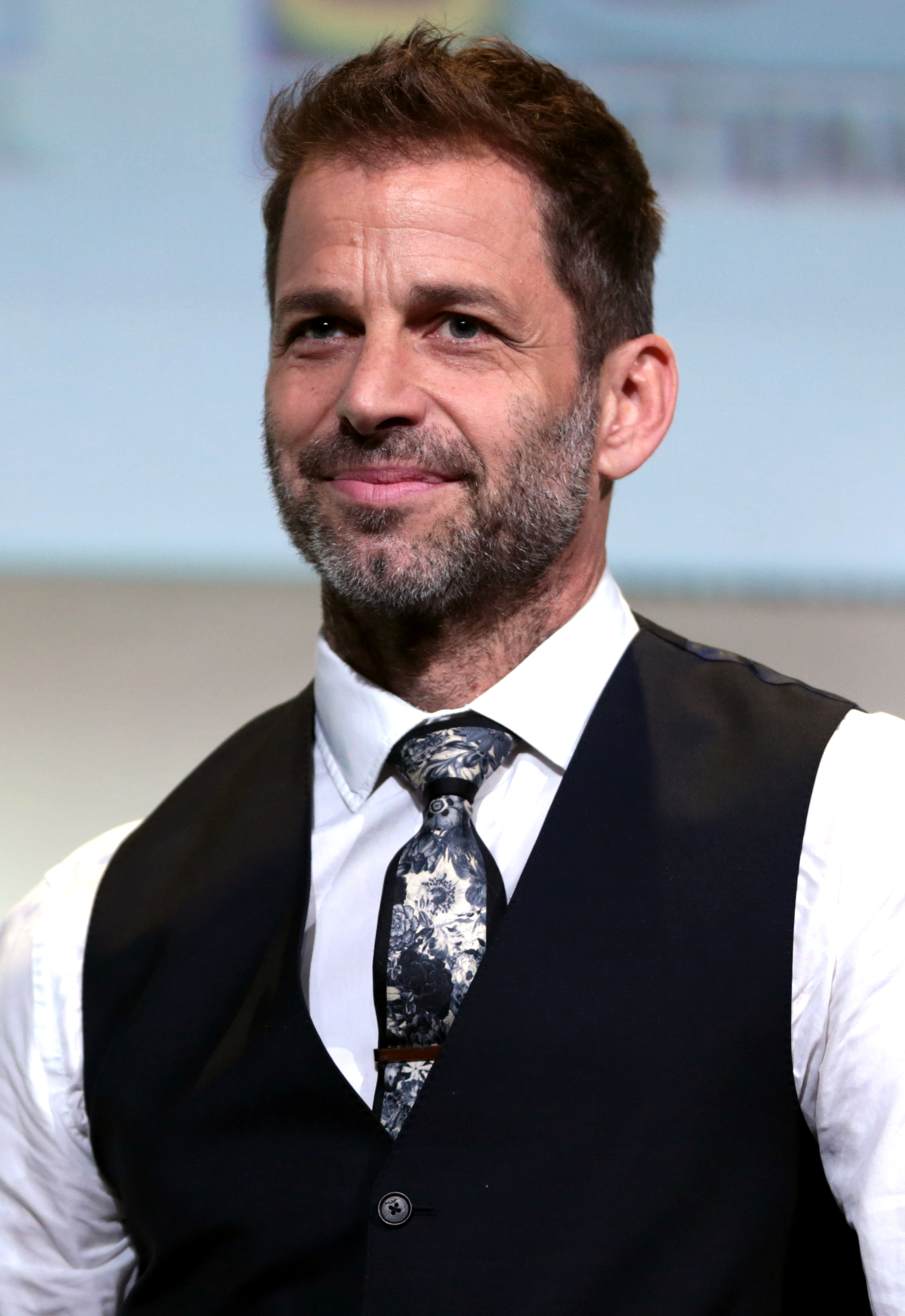
Zack Snyder (pictured here at the 2016 San Diego Comic-Con) worked primarily as a television commercial director before he made his feature film debut with Dawn of the Dead.

Zack Snyder chose to direct the remake as his first feature film because it gave the television commercial director "a reason to care about every shot". Not wanting his version inevitably compared to George A. Romero's, he concurred with the producers on reimagining the latter film as opposed to doing it as a "remake", which, in his view, would have entailed re-shooting Romero's script. For that matter, he aimed to make his film a straight horror that was "as serious as a heart attack" and keep every aspect of its production as grounded in reality as possible. His approach included previsualizing the film with storyboards and introducing the concept of running zombies, which he said was his "fresh, new way" of giving it a sense of verisimilitude and rendering zombies as if they were real threats, especially when they attack in hordes. Snyder maintained Gunn's decision not to reveal the origin of the zombie outbreak, believing it was "obvious that in this fallen society, you wouldn't know where the whole plague started".

==== Set design ====
In searching for a suitable upscale mall location for the film, production designer Andrew Neskoromny looked for existing malls that were scheduled for demolition. His search yielded no results until he found the now-defunct Thornhill Square shopping mall in Toronto, Ontario, Canada, which measured approximately 45,000 square feet (1.0 acre). Dubbed the "Crossroads Mall", the crew completely redid the mall over an eight-week period, adding an expensive water feature near the entrance, 14 stores, parking structures, and warehouse areas. Since Snyder wanted the stores palpable in terms of design and stood not merely as storefronts, Neskoromny's team accordingly built them as actual retail stores complete with merchandise. These stores were given fake names, since only two major retail brands agreed to be featured in the film.

==== Makeup and practical effects ====
The special makeup effects were created by David LeRoy Anderson, with assistance from his actress wife Heather Langenkamp. Prior to accepting the job from Universal Studios' then-executive James D. Brubaker, Anderson had been in a two-year hiatus from working as a makeup effects artist to operate his company DLA Silverwear. Anderson completed his test makeups for the film over four weeks, and then he and his team traveled to the Toronto set and set up their makeup effects lab next to the mall.

To depict a heightened realistic look to the zombies, Anderson researched on the appearance of decay following human death, looking through several medical books, war footages, and crime scene photographs showing graphic images of trauma victims; he broke down the look of decomposition into three stages:

The first stage looks like someone who was just in the ER – pale, with lots of fresh blood. The second stage has moist wounds but the skin is beginning to break down. There is a lot of discoloration and mottling, mostly blues and greens. The third stage is the most intense, with the skeletal form coming through. The wounds are dried-up, the skin is sloughing off and colors are oily blacks.

Gunshot wounds to the head were achieved with practical effects. Anderson created bullet hit squibs covered with prosthetic scalps and attached to the back of the actor's head to be detonated. Concerned about the risk thereof, he developed an alternative method in which his crew would attach wires to the scalps loaded with blood packs and yank them with a remote-controlled "air ratchet system", lending a similar gruesome effect as with the squibs, sans potential harm.

=== Filming and post-production ===
==== Principal photography ====
Filming began on June 9, 2003, on location in various parts of Toronto, Ontario, Canada. Hundreds of zombie extras had to be constantly available for the entire shoot. To handle the volume of willing extras, Anderson and his team built a large "factory" where painted extras would stay put until they are spoken for by either the main or second unit film crew. They built various makeup rooms for the artists to work in: one consisted of camper trailers where they would apply detailed prosthetic makeups to extras playing "hero zombies", a special type of zombie; and the other consisted of tents where they would produce painted masks for extras playing background zombies. Extras playing foreground zombies were painted with plain palette makeups in Anderson's mall lab. The makeup artists were given his concept images to work on as references. According to Anderson and Heather Langenkamp, the most extras they ever had in a given day sat between 200 and 400, with a total of 3,000 makeups completed when filming ended on September 6, 2003.

==== Visual effects and title sequence ====
The scene in which the mall's parking lot is packed with tens of thousands of zombies was achieved with motion-control passes, and actor Ving Rhames being filmed over a cluster of 200 extras that were shot against green screen at various spots.

The visual effects for the film were provided by Canadian VFX studio Mr. X Inc., with its president Dennis Berardi serving as the film's co-VFX supervisor.

The production shot scenes for which Snyder wanted as many as 4,000 live-action zombies, which Berardi created rather as a combination of practical zombies and CG zombies which he built as 3D models with Autodesk Maya. One such scene involved tens of thousands of zombies at the mall's parking lot, which was shot with motion-control passes whose green screen elements of 200 extras, combined with the CG zombies, were later composited to create a "digital crowd simulation that looks realistic".

Kyle Cooper designed the title sequence for the film, using real human blood.

== Soundtrack ==
=== Film score ===
The score for Dawn of the Dead was composed by Tyler Bates, his first for a horror film. Bates was hired after being recommended by music supervisor, G. Marq Roswell, as both of them were involved on the Mario Van Peebles's film Baadasssss! (2003). However, the studio was not convinced on Bates's hiring because he was not an established composer at that time, but upon Snyder's insistence, he was ultimately hired.

While scoring the film, Bates avoided taking cues from the original film's music by the band Goblin, as he felt it incompatible with what Snyder had filmed. Although he liked Goblin's themes for the counterpart, he felt it was specific to that period and Snyder's version had a "different attitude" in comparison to the original film. Hence, he let go of the popular themes from the original film, including the main title theme, which he felt "was cool and was a different thing". Influenced by the works of composers adept at creating dissonant themes, such as Béla Bartók and Krzysztof Penderecki, he combined elements of electronic music and 20th-century orchestra with the intention of making the audience "very, very uncomfortable".

Milan Records released Bates's score in physical format for the first time on October 23, 2012, a week after the record label released it digitally via iTunes Store and Amazon Music. The album comprises 31 tracks, all of which were composed by Bates. Dawn of the Dead also marks the first of several collaborations between him and Snyder: he would later compose for the director on 300 (2006), Watchmen (2009), and Sucker Punch (2011).

=== Other songs ===
In a 2023 interview with Total Film, Snyder revealed he had lobbied for the inclusion of the Richard Cheese cover of "Down with the Sickness", originally sung by the heavy metal band Disturbed, which plays in a montage where the characters relieve boredom in the mall. According to Snyder, the studio originally declined the Richard Cheese version in favor of the Disturbed version, but he managed to convince them that the former was appropriate for the scene. Snyder also stated his rationale behind the decision to play "People Who Died" by the Jim Carroll Band at the end of the film: "I really love that [opening chords of 'People Who Died'] DANG! DANG! DANG, DANG, DANG! I thought that it was cool as a way to end the movie because it's so dark. It's a bleak ending, in a cool way."

== Release ==
Universal Pictures distributed the film worldwide, excluding the United Kingdom, Ireland, France, Japan, Scandinavia, Iceland, Turkey, Israel, South Africa and the Middle East. Strike Entertainment retained the film through a set of closed deals, selling the film to Entertainment Film Distributors in the United Kingdom and Ireland, Metropolitan Filmexport in France, Toho-Towa in Japan, Nordisk Film in Scandinavia, Samfilm in Iceland, Pinema in Turkey, Forum Film in Israel, Nu Metro in South Africa and Italia Film in the Middle East.

=== Box office ===
"[Y]ou could see a movie with one guy rising from the dead or you can see one with thousands."

— James Gunn on the likelihood of Dawn of the Dead being overtaken by The Passion of the Christ at the box office

Dawn of the Dead was marketed with its 10-minute opening sequence that was broadcast on cable television four nights prior to its theatrical release. Entertainment Weekly projected that it would outperform The Passion of the Christ in its United States opening weekend, with an audience base comprising largely young males and estimated gross of $22 million.

In the U.S. and Canada, the film was released alongside Eternal Sunshine of the Spotless Mind and Taking Lives, on March 19, 2004. Dawn of the Dead ended up performing above projections, debuting to $27.3 million in its U.S. opening weekend and claiming the top spot The Passion of the Christ held for three consecutive weekends. Variety reported, "Some 63% of Dawn [audiences] were under age 25, with 57% of patrons male. Hispanic moviegoers comprised 21% of its supporters and African Americans 14%." Dawn of the Dead ended its theatrical run as a commercial success, grossing $102 million worldwide on a $26 million budget; it grossed $59 million in the United States and Canada and $43.3 million in other territories.

The release of Dawn of the Dead in the U.S. nearly coincided with that of Shaun of the Dead, another zombie film distributed by Universal Pictures. In a February 2004 Variety report, a spokesman at Universal revealed that the studio had greenlit Shaun of the Dead "with the condition that Dawn of the Dead would be released here in the U.S. first" in order to avoid this conflict.

Dawn of the Dead was screened out of competition at the 2004 Cannes Film Festival.

=== Home media ===
Universal Pictures Home Entertainment released Dawn of the Dead on DVD, Blu-ray, and digital with director Zack Snyder's unrated director's cut of the film: he described this version as longer, gorier, and more character-driven than the theatrical one. Bonus features found on the DVD and Blu-ray include Snyder and co-producer Eric Newman's audio commentary; the featurettes Attack of the Living Dead, Raising the Dead, Drawing the Dead, Splitting Headaches, Surviving the Dawn, and Special Report: Zombie Invasion; the short film The Lost Tape: Andy's Terrifying Last Days Revealed; deleted scenes with optional commentary by Snyder and Newman; and the film's theatrical trailer.

On Halloween of 2017, Shout! Factory's horror sub-label Scream Factory released a two-disc collector's edition Blu-ray of Dawn of the Dead, which contains the film's theatrical version and the director's cut. The Blu-ray, which is said to have been "derived from the digital intermediate archival negative", contains bonus features found in previous releases in addition to new and exclusive ones featuring interviews with actors Ty Burrell and Jake Weber, screenwriter James Gunn, and makeup effects artists David LeRoy Anderson and Heather Langenkamp. A 4K Ultra HD collector's edition Blu-ray from Scream Factory with extras ported over from the label's previous release was released on January 31, 2023.

== Reception ==
=== Contemporary response ===
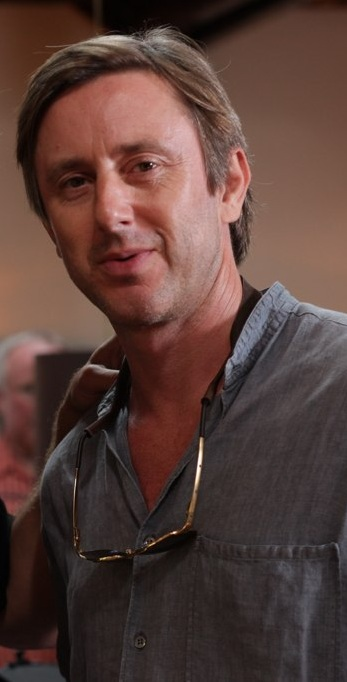
Weber (2009)

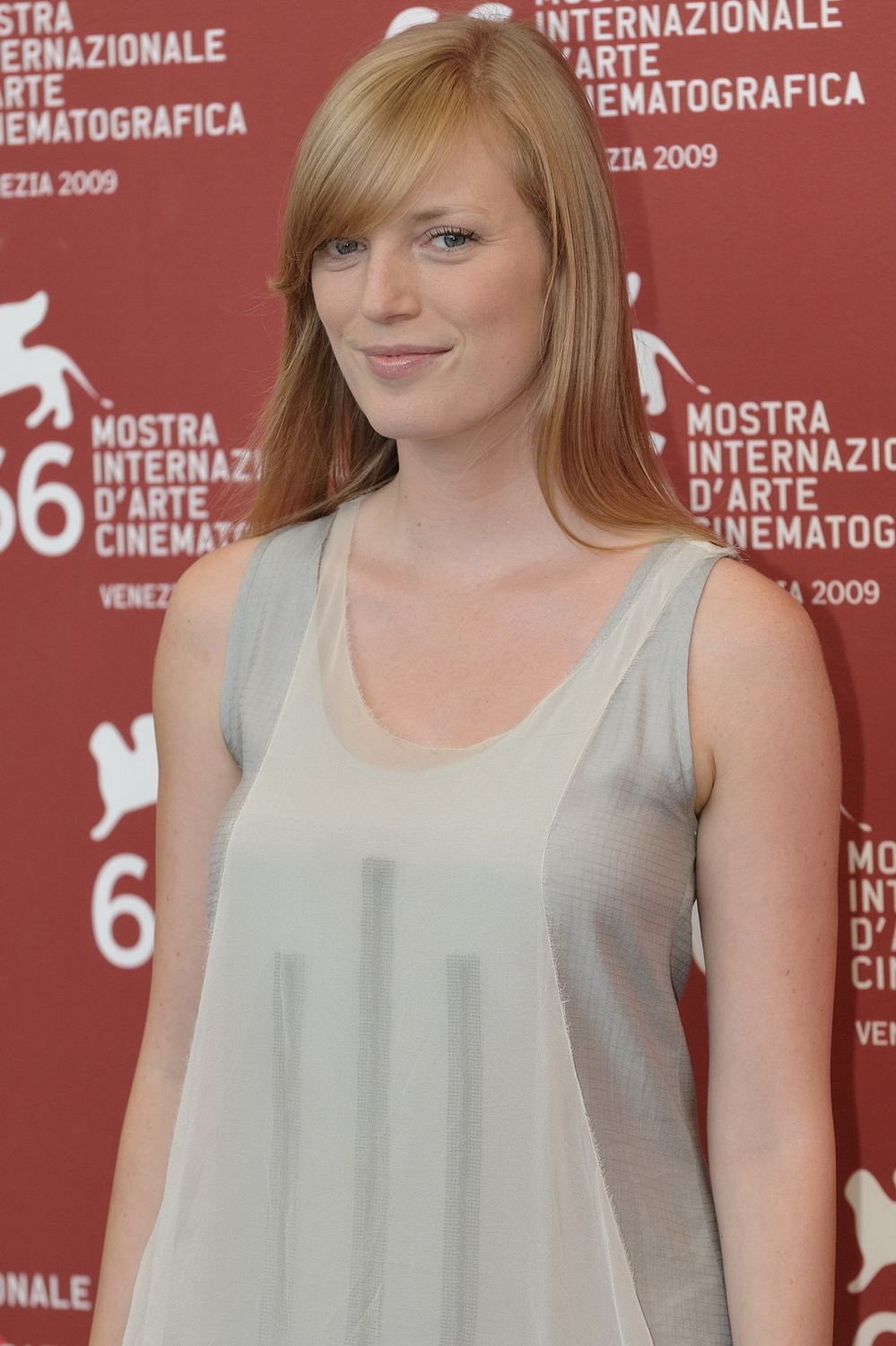
Polley (2009)

Jake Weber and Sarah Polley each received praise for their performances.

Dawn of the Dead received generally positive reviews upon its release, with critics praising it as a worthy remake of the original and a fine addition to the zombie genre. Audiences polled by CinemaScore reported that moviegoers gave the film an average letter grade of B.

The film was considered by most to be an improvement over the original in terms of acting, production values, and scares, although Variety and Derek Malcolm felt that it was only intermittently scary. Despite giving it a negative review, Variety said that the film was "more palatable" than the "atrocious" Texas Chainsaw Massacre remake of the previous year. Michael Gingold wrote, "[...] Dawn of the Dead joins The Ring and The Texas Chainsaw Massacre as an update that both honors its source and emerges as an effective horror film in its own right", a sentiment also shared by IGN. Lisa Schwarzbaum praised Snyder's direction in "a killer feature debut", while Roger Ebert said in a positive review that anyone paying to see it is guaranteed to get their money's worth.

Abundant praise was given to the film's opening sequence, which, for an otherwise negative review on The Hollywood Reporter, was "pulse-poundingly good". Gingold found Snyder's camerawork using a first-person video-game perspective at the beginning of the film to be praiseworthy, more so than those of the live-action videogame adaptations Resident Evil (2002) and House of the Dead (2003). The lack of dark humor of the original was a source of criticism, although the scene involving the survivors and zombies resembling celebrities was considered by most to be funny and was cited by The Hollywood Reporter as some of the film's "moments of inspired audacity". Many noted that the fast-moving zombies of Dawn of the Dead were similar to those of 28 Days Later, but felt that the Danny Boyle film was "darker and creepier", "smarter, more rigorously structured", and could pass for a remake of the original, by contrast.

Despite the general praise, some critics said the film gave scant consideration to Romero's satirical critique of consumerism, among other sociopolitical issues. Ebert and Variety stated that whereas Romero used the shopping mall to stage a metaphor about consumer society, Snyder treated it merely as a convenient sanctuary for his characters. Gingold lamented that unlike Romero's film, Snyder's provided no social commentary on racism through its Black characters Kenneth and Andre as well as the interracial relationship between Andre and Luda. By contrast, Manohla Dargis commented that Romero's consumerist metaphor has lost its significance in the years since the original's release, "with the politics of consumption now an established academic field and shopping now considered a statement of identity". IGN praised the film's tonal departure from Romero's, calling it "a calculated risk that paid off".

Some commented that Dawn of the Dead was content to indulge in bloody zombie killings devoid of meaning and introspection once present in the original, leaving the audience rather numbed and "less mercifully handled, even at the end-credits". Wesley Morris gave a negative review in which he said the film "feels like the product of the PlayStation era" as opposed to a reverence for Romero. Elvis Mitchell made a similar complaint, writing that "[t]he flesh-eaters are picked off like video-game targets". Conversely, the BBC complimented the film as a "stylish, gore-drenched shoot-em-up", and Dargis attributed its appeal not to the bloody violence but to "the filmmakers' commitment to genre fundamentals". Writing in a positive review, internet-based critic James Berardinelli said fans of "tight, tense, graphic horror" should be able to enjoy the same aplenty in Dawn of the Dead.

While Schwarzbaum and Dargis complimented Gunn's script as "sharp" and propulsive, respectively, others took issue with what they believed was a lack of plot and character development. Morris found most of the characters to be too irritating that he believed audiences might want them "thrown from the mall roof to the throngs of undead". The Chicago Tribune called the characters clichéd and about as dumb as the undead, but sympathized with the "tragic" moral dilemma faced by Andre as an expectant father. Conversely, Berardinelli said that while there are moments in which the characters show a lack of common sense, "it's inevitable that most of them end up as one-dimensional throw-aways whose sole purpose is to increase the body count" and that "not many people go to a horror film looking for character development and drama". He and Ebert called the subplots of Kenneth and Andre "touching", with Berardinelli adding that these were "handled with a deft hand". Although Ebert was personally not on board with the characters' "risky" plan to escape from the mall instead of awaiting the zombies' natural death, he remarked that "taking chances makes for good action scenes". Mitchell, however, criticized the plot as "strictly by the numbers" and said that the climactic gun store scene "shows why zombie pictures aren't unsettling anymore".

The ensemble cast was generally praised: comments ranged from "superlative" and "convincing down the line" to "respectable" and "annoying". Some complimented Sarah Polley as "a perfect against-type heroine" with "a nice anxious stare". IGN said that least attention was given to Phifer's "naturally charismatic presence" with such a large cast, although Rhames was effective as Polley's "quietly authoritative foil" and Jake Weber was praiseworthy in "a thankless role". While giving equal praise to Polley, Phifer, and Rhames, Gingold singled out Weber's existentialist role as "the best of all", as did the BBC, who also credited the actor with "bringing a redoubtable decency and charisma to a potentially bland part, like the young Roy Scheider in Jaws".

=== Retrospective assessment ===
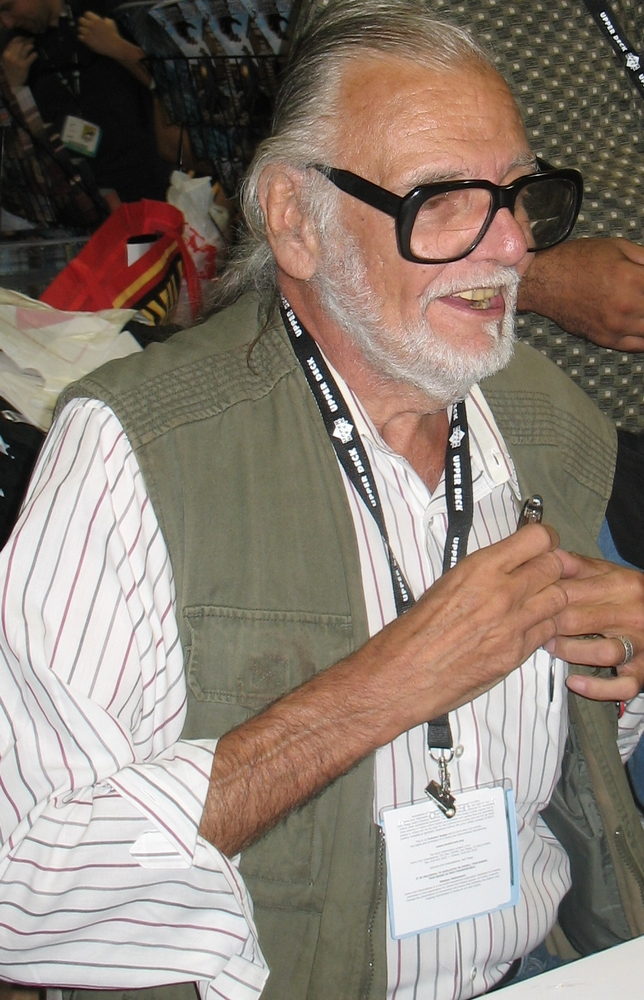
George A. Romero (pictured here at the 2007 San Diego Comic-Con) expressed dissatisfaction with the remake upon its release.

In a 2005 interview with actor Simon Pegg for Time Out, George A. Romero described the remake as an effective action film, even though he felt it eventually lost its deeper purpose, becoming more like a video game in its emphasis on fast-moving threats and spectacle. He criticized it for lacking the underlying thematic substance he considered essential. In a 2024 interview with The Hollywood Reporter, Pegg described the remake as a "great movie", but criticized Snyder's decision to stick with the title Dawn of the Dead, saying, "They could have called it Deadish, which was a great line in the film that one of the actors used, and it still would have been a great film, but when you just take a title because people recognize it, it's so disrespectful to the original."

Numerous publications have named Dawn of the Dead Snyder's best film. (Note: Attributed to multiple references:) Revisiting the film on its 15th anniversary in 2019, Joe Lipsett wrote the following verdict for Bloody Disgusting:

Fifteen years later, Dawn of the Dead completely holds up. The film's flaws are mostly at the character level, though having a dumb zombie baby and a few undeveloped red shirts in the mix is hardly a deal breaker. The action – particularly the opening scene and the propane explosion climax – in addition to the fantastic special effects makeup, the brief flirtation with found footage, and the reverence for its source text while introducing something new makes 2004's Dawn of the Dead one of the best remakes on the market.

In a June 2018 article for The Hollywood Reporter, Richard Newby wrote that Dawn of the Dead helped revitalize the zombie genre along with 28 Days Later at a time when the United States "was ripe for the re-emergence of zombie movies" following the September 11 attacks, which he believes to have contributed to the Americans' "increased fear of biological weapons, fervent mass militarization and the burrowing question of who exactly are the people we call our neighbors". Author Stephen King, in the forenote of the 2010 edition of his book Danse Macabre, saw what he believed to be Snyder's subtext conveying the horrors induced by terrorist attacks, drawing parallels between the zombie apocalypse and a post-9/11 America. King described Dawn of the Dead as "genius perfected" in terms of its standing in the zombie genre. South Park creators Trey Parker and Matt Stone and South Korean filmmaker Yeon Sang-ho have also spoken of their appreciation of Dawn of the Dead and cited its influence upon their works.

On the review aggregator website Rotten Tomatoes, 77% of 193 critics' reviews are positive. The website's consensus reads: "A kinetic, violent and surprisingly worthy remake of George Romero's horror classic that pays homage to the original while working on its own terms." As of 2024, Dawn of the Dead is Snyder's highest-rated film on the website, where it has also made its lists of The 20 Scariest Opening Scenes in Horror Movie History (at number 6), The 25 Best Horror Movie Remakes (at number 9), The 30 Essential Zombie Movies (at number 13), and 18 Memorable Horror Remakes. Metacritic, which uses a weighted average, assigned the film a score of 59 out of 100, based on 37 critics, indicating "mixed or average" reviews. Dawn of the Dead has made several rankings of the top zombie films, including number 3 by Rolling Stone (2012), number 12 by Empire (2020), by Collider (2021), number 17 by IndieWire (2022), and by Variety (2023); as well as the best horror films, including number 3 by Dread Central (2010), number 8 by Bloody Disgusting (2009), number 52 by IGN, and number 55 by Rolling Stone (2020).

=== Accolades ===
Year	Award	Category	Recipient	Result	Ref.
2004	Bram Stoker Awards	Screenplay	James Gunn	Nominated	
2004	Golden Trailer Awards	Best Horror/Thriller	Dawn of the Dead	Won	
2004	Golden Trailer Awards	Best Music	Dawn of the Dead	Nominated	
2005	Saturn Awards	Best Horror Film	Dawn of the Dead	Nominated	
2005	Saturn Awards	Best Make-Up	David LeRoy Anderson and Mario Cacioppo	Nominated	

== Spiritual successor ==
On March 25, 2007, Variety announced that Warner Bros. Pictures would produce a new zombie film from a screenplay written by Joby Harold, based on an original idea conceived by Snyder. In a statement, Snyder said that he wanted the film to feel similar to Dawn of the Dead and 300 and that it would center around a father in Las Vegas "who tries to save his daughter from imminent death in a zombie-infested world". At the time, Wesley Coller was attached to executive produce, with Snyder and his wife Deborah Snyder producing through Cruel & Unusual Films (now known as The Stone Quarry). Snyder got the idea during Dawn of the Dead's production and wanted to explore a new evolution of the zombies. The film is not a sequel to Dawn of the Dead but rather a spiritual successor. Snyder realized that he needed a new origin story to develop the plot and create a new incarnation of the living dead. He titled the project Army of the Dead as a tribute to the works of George A. Romero. After languishing for several years in development hell, the distribution rights to the film were acquired by Netflix in 2019, and Snyder began shooting that same year.

Army of the Dead had a week-long limited theatrical release starting May 14 prior to its wider Netflix release on May 21, 2021.

== See also ==
- List of American films of 2004
- List of zombie films
- Night of the Living Dead (1990 film): a remake of Romero's 1968 film of the same name

== Bibliography ==
- David LeRoy Anderson (special makeup effects artist) (2004). Raising the Dead [Dawn of the Dead: Director's Cut] (Featurette on DVD). Universal Pictures Home Entertainment.
