= Princess Caraboo (film) =

1994 film by Michael Austin

- Theatrical release poster
- Directed by: Michael Austin
- Written by: Michael Austin; John Wells
- Produced by: Andrew S. Karsch; Simon Bosanquet; Armyan Bernstein; Tom Rosenberg; Marc Abraham
- Starring: Phoebe Cates; Jim Broadbent; Wendy Hughes; Kevin Kline; John Lithgow; Stephen Rea
- Cinematography: Freddie Francis
- Edited by: George Akers
- Music by: Richard Hartley
- Production company: Beacon Communications
- Distributed by: TriStar Pictures (United States); J&M Entertainment (International)
- Release dates: September 16, 1994 (United States); December 16, 1994 (United Kingdom)
- Running time: 97 minutes
- Country: United States
- Language: English
- Box office: $3,062,530

Princess Caraboo is a 1994 American historical comedy-drama film. It was directed by Michael Austin, and written by Austin and John Wells. The story is based on the real-life 19th-century character Princess Caraboo, who passed herself off in British society as an exotic princess who spoke a strange foreign language. It stars Phoebe Cates in her final film before she shifted her focus away from acting to raising her children.

== Plot ==
In Regency England, an exotically dressed woman is found in the fields, speaking a language no-one can understand. She ends up at the home of the Worrall family, the local gentry.

Their Greek butler, Frixos, thinks the woman is a fraud from the start. Mr Worrall sends her to the magistrate to be tried for vagrancy, but Mrs Worrall agrees to care for her. Mr Gutch, a local printer and newspaper reporter, takes an interest in the case, especially after the woman claims via mime to be Princess Caraboo.

Gutch talks to the farm workers who found her and learns she had a book from the Magdalene Hospital in London on her. When the Worralls leave on a trip the servants inspect her for a tattoo, which they believe all natives of the South Seas have and are shocked to find Princess Caraboo has one on her thigh.

Frixos tells Gutch he now thinks Princess Caraboo is a genuine princess. Mr Worrall uses her presence to recruit investors for the spice trade which will be facilitated by her when she returns to her native land. Gutch brings in Professor Wilkinson, a linguist who is initially dismissive of Caraboo's story but has enough doubt to refuse to say she is a fraud.

The local society finds Princess Caraboo fascinating, and they flock to attend parties and soirees with her. Mr Gutch begins investigating people connected with the Magdalene House. Lady Apthorpe takes Caraboo to a ball held for the Prince Regent, who is fascinated by her.

Gutch learns Caraboo is actually Mary Baker, who worked as a servant for Mrs Peake. He sneaks into the ball to warn her she's been found out, but she refuses to acknowledge what he tells her. Mrs Peake comes and confronts Caraboo and identifies her as Mary Baker. She is locked up.

The local magistrate and Mr Worrall want to hang her. Mrs Worrall gives M. Gutch documents implicating her husband and the magistrate in a bank fraud. He uses these to work a trade, he will bury the story if Mary Baker can go to America. Gutch, who has fallen in love with Mary, leaves with her for the United States.

== Cast ==
- Phoebe Cates as Princess Caraboo
- Jim Broadbent as Mr. Worrall
- Wendy Hughes as Mrs. Worrall
- Kevin Kline as Frixos
- John Lithgow as Professor Wilkinson
- Stephen Rea as Gutch
- Peter Eyre as Lord Apthorpe
- Jacqueline Pearce as Lady Apthorpe
- John Wells as Reverend Wells
- John Lynch as Amon McCarthy
- John Sessions as Prince Regent
- Annabel Brooks as Lady Neville
- Arkie Whiteley as Betty
- Jerry Hall as Lady Motley
- Anna Chancellor as Mrs. Peake

== Reception ==
Princess Caraboo received mixed reviews. It holds a rating of 63% on Rotten Tomatoes based on 16 reviews. Michael Medved of Sneak Previews ranked Princess Caraboo among the best films of 1994.

Roger Ebert of The Chicago Sun-Times noted in 1995 how the film had a "first-rate cast" but was not screened for critics and vanished from cinemas quickly before he could see it on his own time. Ebert's brief commentary also noted how films can be sabotaged by power struggles at movie studios or poor promotion.
