= The Man with the Iron Fists =

2012 film directed by RZA

- Theatrical release poster
- Directed by: RZA
- Screenplay by: The RZA; Eli Roth
- Story by: RZA
- Produced by: Eli Roth; Marc Abraham; Eric Newman; Thomas A. Bliss
- Starring: Russell Crowe; Cung Le; Lucy Liu; Byron Mann; RZA; Rick Yune; David Bautista; Jamie Chung
- Cinematography: Chi Ying Chan
- Edited by: Joe D'Augustine
- Music by: RZA; Howard Drossin
- Production companies: Strike Entertainment; Arcade Pictures
- Distributed by: Universal Pictures
- Release date: November 2, 2012 (United States)
- Running time: 96 minutes
- Country: United States
- Language: English
- Budget: $15 million
- Box office: $20.5 million

The Man with the Iron Fists is a 2012 American martial arts film directed by RZA and written by RZA and Eli Roth. The film stars RZA, Russell Crowe, Cung Le, Lucy Liu, Byron Mann, Rick Yune, Dave Bautista, and Jamie Chung. Set in 19th century China, the story follows a series of lone warriors who are forced to unite to defeat a common foe and save their home of Jungle Village.

Development began in 2005 when RZA shared his idea for the film with Roth. After nearly two years of development, Roth and RZA secured financial backing in May 2010. Filming began in December 2010 on a $15 million budget and concluded by March 2011. The film was shot in Shanghai and at other locations in China. RZA and Howard Drossin composed the film's musical score, and RZA produced its soundtrack, which featured several new songs by various artists. A series of concerts featuring music from the soundtrack were held to promote the film.

The film was released in North America on November 2, 2012. Critics were divided over the film's homage to martial arts films, considering it well-choreographed and representative of the genre, but offering nothing original, and the direction was criticized for a lack of refinement. The performances of Crowe and Mann were well received. The film earned $20.5 million at the box office.

A direct-to-video sequel, The Man with the Iron Fists 2, was released in 2015.

== Plot ==
In 19th-century China, Jungle Village is home to several warring clans. The village blacksmith creates deadly weapons for the clans, intending to use his payments to purchase the freedom of his lover Lady Silk, and leave the village. The region's governor tasks the Lion Clan's leader, Gold Lion, with protecting a large shipment of gold that must pass through the village. Gold is betrayed by his lieutenants Silver Lion and Bronze Lion, who plan to steal the gold. They use the chaos ensuing from a fight with the Hyena Clan to allow their co-conspirator Poison Dagger—the governor's aide—to assassinate Gold, after which Silver becomes the Lions' leader. Gold's son Zen-Yi learns of his father's murder and sets off to the village to seek revenge.

The Qing Emperor's undercover emissary Jack Knife arrives in the village to monitor the gold and takes up residence in the Pink Blossom, a brothel run by Madam Blossom, Lady Silk's madame. Silver sends members of the Rodent clan to kill Zen-Yi before he can reach the village, but Zen-Yi kills them. The mercenary Brass Body arrives in the village and meets with Silver; he is sent to kill Zen-Yi. The blacksmith meets with Silk in the brothel and delivers the final payment needed to free her. After arriving in the village, Zen-Yi and his men are confronted by Brass and find that they cannot physically harm him because his skin turns to metal on impact. Brass beats Zen-Yi and destroys his blade-laden armor. Zen-Yi's last surviving man sacrifices himself to pull a canopy support beam loose, burying Brass under heavy stone. The blacksmith is watching the fight; he rescues Zen-Yi and helps him recover as penance for crafting the weapon that killed Zen-Yi's father.

Meanwhile, the gold shipment arrives in the village, accompanied by two skilled warriors, the Geminis. The Lions soon confront the Geminis and their men, and in the ensuing fight, Poison Dagger assassinates the Geminis, and the Lions capture the gold. Jack later arrives to investigate the incident and learns that the Geminis were poisoned with mercury-tipped weapons, leading him to the blacksmith. The Lions' theft prompts the governor to send his Jackal troops to recover the shipment or destroy the village. Zen-Yi asks the blacksmith to craft him a new suit of weaponized armor. The Lions suspect that the blacksmith is helping Zen-Yi and have him tortured for information. The blacksmith refuses to talk, and Brass cuts off his forearms. Jack, who had been following the blacksmith, saves him from bleeding to death. While the blacksmith recovers, he tells Jack of his past as an emancipated American slave who accidentally killed a white man who refused to let him go. He fled America by boat and went to China, where monks trained him to use his body's energy to perform superhuman feats. Jack, with the aid of the blacksmith, crafts his greatest weapon: a pair of iron forearms that he can animate using this energy.

Zen-Yi recovers and joins Jack and the blacksmith. Meanwhile, Blossom offers to let Silver hide the gold in a secret tomb beneath the brothel in return for payment. The gold is stored in a coffin that is raised up to the rafters. That night, Blossom has her girls serve the Lions, and Silk serves Brass. At Blossom's signal, the girls use weapons hidden in their mouths to poison many of the Lions, and they join with Blossom as the Black Widows. When Silk tries to poison Brass, his skin protects him, and he beats and almost kills her. Zen-Yi, Jack, and the blacksmith arrive and join with the Black Widows to fight the remaining Lions while Blossom and Bronze fight and kill each other. While fighting Jack, Poison Dagger is crushed to death between large moving gears. Silver and Zen-Yi fight in the tomb; Zen-Yi cuts the coffin free, and it crushes Silver, killing him. The blacksmith finds Silk, who dies in his arms. He confronts Brass, and his iron fists prove capable of inflicting damage on Brass's seemingly invincible body. While Brass is in metal form, a powerful punch from the blacksmith shatters him into pieces. Jack runs outside in time to stop the soldiers from decimating the building with Gatling guns.

Ultimately, Jack leaves the village to accompany the gold, and Zen-Yi tells the blacksmith that he has gained a brother. With the clans destroyed and the village safe, the blacksmith vows to keep it that way and destroys the sign pointing to his weapon shop. During the credits, Zen-Yi's pregnant fiancée is kidnapped by a bird clan, prompting Zen-Yi to seek the blacksmith's aid.

== Cast ==
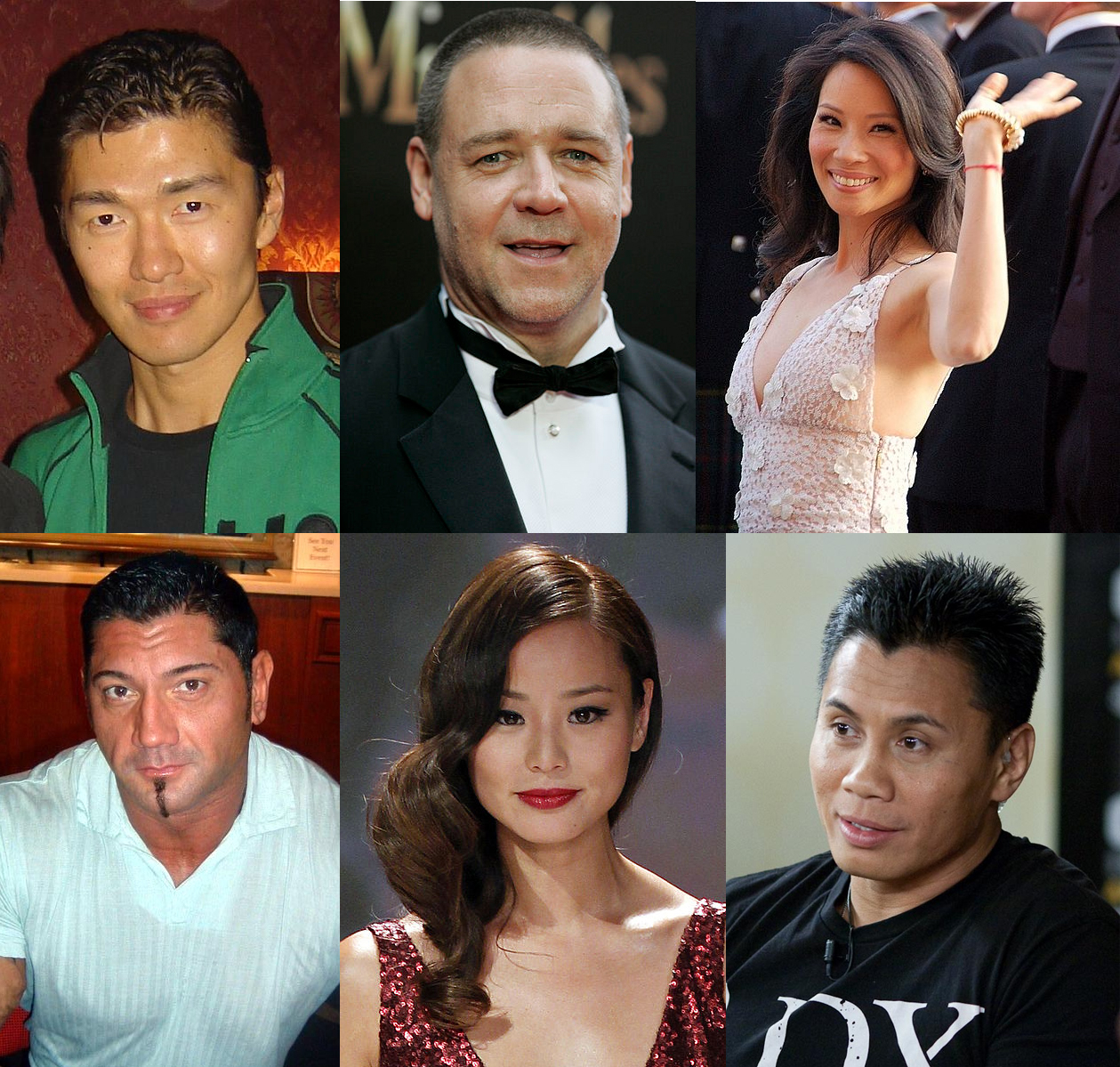
A selection of the film's cast. Clockwise: Rick Yune, Russell Crowe, Lucy Liu, Cung Le, Jamie Chung, and David Bautista.

- RZA as Blacksmith / The Man with the Iron Fists:

An emancipated slave from America who becomes the blacksmith of Jungle Village. He channels an ancient energy to turn himself into a living weapon. His name is Thaddeus Henry Smith. RZA wrote the role specifically for himself, and trained in Hung Ga for 1–2 hours a day over 2 months in preparation.

- Rick Yune as Zen-Yi, The X-Blade:

The son of the murdered Lion Clan leader who goes to Jungle Village to avenge his father's death. RZA said that he had Yune in mind for the role before the script had been completed.

- Russell Crowe as Jack Knife:

An opium-addicted British soldier named after his signature weapon. The character was partly inspired by RZA's late cousin Ol' Dirty Bastard. Crowe based his performance on Clint Eastwood in Dirty Harry (1971) and The Outlaw Josey Wales (1976). Crowe agreed to join the cast because of his previous working relationship with RZA. Crowe was only able to spend 10 days filming his scenes.

- Lucy Liu as Madam Blossom:

The owner of the Pink Blossom brothel, whom Liu described as the queen of the village. Liu wanted to emphasize Blossom's strength against all the male fighters and convinced RZA to give the character a fight sequence with Cung Le's Bronze Lion.

- David Bautista as Brass Body:

A mercenary capable of turning his body to metal, making him invulnerable. Bautista described the character as a "good guy" who "made a lot of bad choices in his life. He doesn’t really understand the difference between right and wrong." RZA auditioned Bautista for the role after seeing him "moving as fast as lightning" during a stick-fighting training video.

- Jamie Chung as Lady Silk:

A prostitute in the Pink Blossom and the blacksmith's lover.

- Cung Le as Bronze Lion:

A member of the Lion Clan. Le came to RZA's attention following his 2008 mixed martial arts fight against Frank Shamrock. Bronze Lion's fighting style incorporates elements of Tiger Kung-Fu and Le's own training in kicks and scissor kicks.

- Byron Mann as Silver Lion:

The leader of the Lion Clan after he kills the previous leader. Mann was initially cast for a smaller role but after his successful audition, he was given the bigger role of Silver Lion.

The cast also includes Pam Grier as the blacksmith's mother Jane, Osric Chau as Blacksmith's assistant, MC Jin as Zen-Yi's ally Chan, Daniel Wu as Poison Dagger, and Andrew Lin and Grace Huang as The Geminis. Co-writer Eli Roth appears in a cameo. Several veteran martial arts actors—including Chen Kuan-tai as Golden Lion, Bryan Leung as Hyena Chief, Telly Liu as Iron Lion, Xue Jing Yao as Copper Lion, Zhu Zhu as Zen-Yi's fiancée Chi Chi, Terence Yin as the Governor, and Gordon Liu as The Abbot—appeared in the film. Liu's role was written for RZA's Shaolin teacher Shi Yan Ming, but Ming could not obtain permission to return to China for filming.

== Production ==
=== Development ===
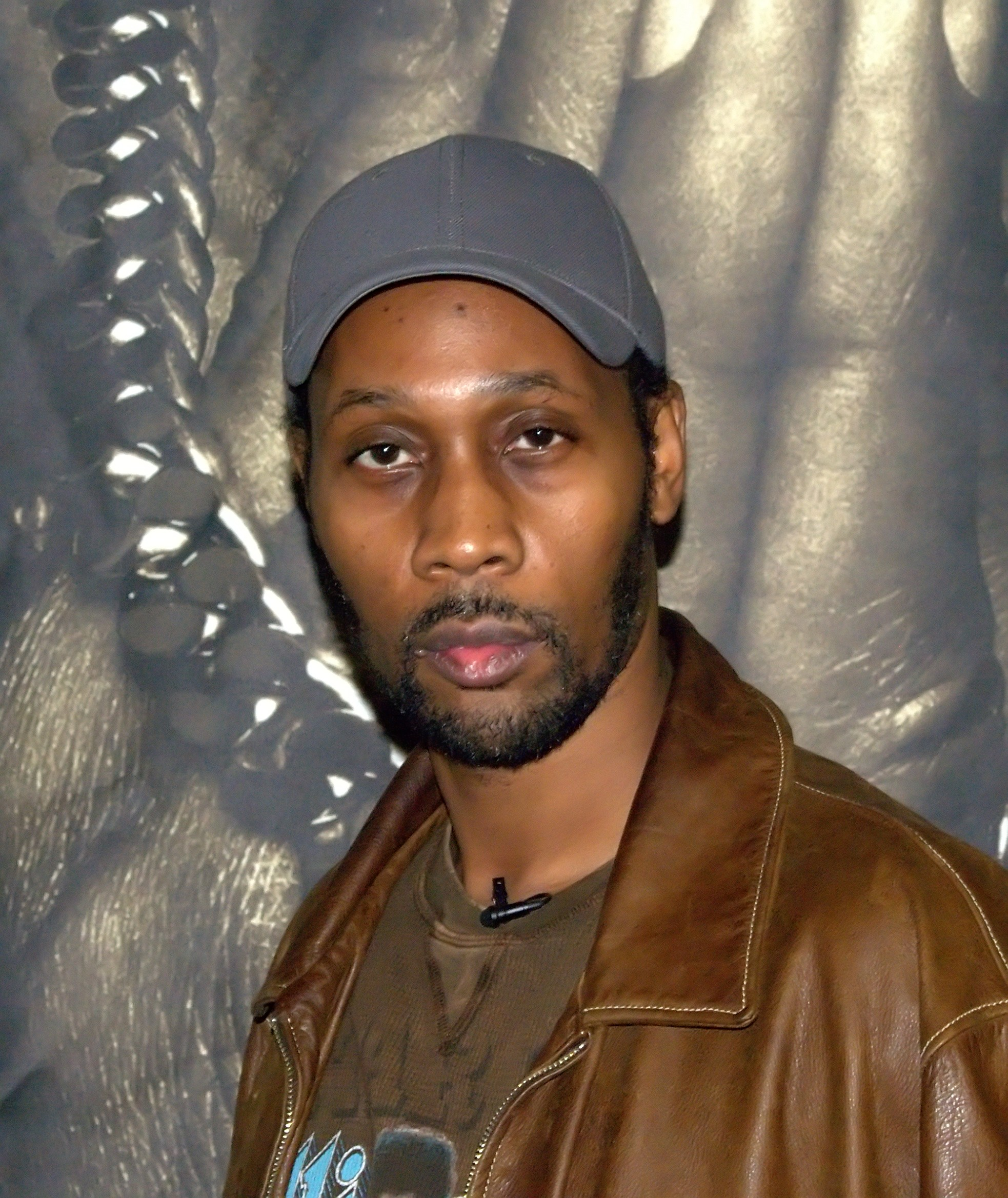
Rza in 2009. The Man with the Iron Fists is his first feature film as director

Development of the film began in 2003 when RZA produced the soundtrack for Quentin Tarantino's film Kill Bill: Volume 1. RZA set himself a $50,000 budget and flew to the Kill Bill set in Beijing, where he spent approximately thirty days taking notes on the way Tarantino directed the film. In 2005, RZA met Eli Roth in Iceland, and they traveled together to LA. During the journey, RZA told Roth of his idea for a kung fu genre film, which attracted Roth's interest, but no further progress was made. RZA completed the story for the film, but Roth convinced him that he would need a completed screenplay for the project to gain any support. In 2007, after Roth's Hostel: Part II was released, Roth and RZA agreed to seriously pursue the project. The pair took the project to several studios and met with their preferred producer, Edward R. Pressman. One of the studios suggested setting the film in a post-apocalyptic situation, which RZA considered. They took the project to Strike Entertainment, which considered that it needed more development and assigned several writers to rewrite the script, which began to depart from RZA's initial idea.

RZA continued to work with Strike Entertainment's writers, but Roth, who returned from filming Inglourious Basterds, was disappointed with the rewritten screenplay and he and RZA spent a year developing and finalizing it. In total, they spent between 18 months and 2 years developing the screenplay in between other projects, and turned RZA's 90-page story into a 130-page screenplay. Citing the specificity of the fictional universe in the Star Wars series, Roth said that the pair tried to fully define the aspects of The Man with the Iron Fists to make it interesting without fight scenes. Roth said that RZA had "imagined every tribe, every fighting style, every costume". The original script focused on several animal-themed clans fighting over territory, in particular Jungle Village, which acted as a center for shipments. As the script developed, several of the clans were removed, and the focus shifted to commerce and the transportation of government gold, which also introduced the government as a higher power over the clans. RZA and Roth approached fights in the script by introducing a new character, fighting style or weapon to avoid monotony; if a fight did not advance the story, they removed it.

RZA then financed and directed a short martial arts film called Wu-Tang vs. the Golden Phoenix featuring Hong Kong-based, kung-fu-trained actors. When he and Roth pitched The Man with the Iron Fists to producers, RZA used the short film to prove that he could handle the martial arts action and be trusted to take on his first directing role. On May 7, 2010, Universal Pictures announced it had agreed to finance and distribute the film, which Roth and Strike Entertainment's Marc Abraham and Eric Newman would produce. The producers gave RZA a $20 million budget.

During the development process, Tarantino agreed to lend his name to the film with a "presented by" credit. In October 2012, RZA said that he and Tarantino had intended to cross over The Man with the Iron Fists with Tarantino's 2012 Western Django Unchained. The crossover would have included a younger version of RZA's blacksmith character in a slave auction, but scheduling conflicts prevented RZA's participation. The Man with the Iron Fists spent 14 weeks in pre-production including four to six weeks on location scouting. RZA insisted that six weeks of pre-production would be sufficient, but Marc Abraham told him to take 14 weeks, for which RZA was later thankful after he reached week 13 and still needed more time. During filming, RZA and Roth discussed the potential for a sequel if the film was successful.

=== Filming ===
"So I said, 'You know what, I don't need that shot.' I mean I achieved at least 85 percent of my vision. You're not going to get everything. You understand, because some stuff is dangerous, some stuff is impractical, it's better to go CGI"

— RZA on why he chose CGI to replace some practical shots.

Principal photography took place over approximately 10 weeks on a $20 million budget. Filming began in China in December 2010 in locations including the city of Shanghai and Hengdian World Studios, and continued until March 2011. Corey Yuen was the film's action choreographer. To compensate for time lost to filming issues, some scenes were filmed in a single take. Approximately 6 weeks into filming, RZA began pushing the crew to work faster to remain on schedule. His assistant director eventually informed RZA that because of the push, some stunt workers were injured and being sent to hospital. After this, RZA abandoned some of his intended shots and replaced them with Computer Generated Images (CGI). Roth also directed some shots for RZA. Crowe and Le were originally scripted to fight each other, but because of Crowe's limited shooting schedule, he did not have the time to rehearse the fight, and instead Le was scripted to fight Liu.

The first cut of the film was four hours long and RZA suggested splitting it into two films, but Roth disagreed. It was edited to 96 minutes to meet the studio's requirements and to excise graphic content that would cause it to receive a restrictive rating, limiting its audience. RZA abandoned the editing process for two weeks, feeling disgust at having to cut the film. In October 2012, he said that he intended to release a "director's cut" of the film for home viewing, and would reinsert at least 13 minutes of the cut footage. RZA described the film as an homage to the martial art films of the Hong Kong-based Shaw Brothers.

The film used mostly practical special effects in preference to CGI. An effect in which Yune's character kills six opponents whose airborne blood spray spells out "revenge" in Chinese, was specifically written to use CGI. RZA declined to subtitle the message for English audiences. The action scenes resulted in several injuries, and Bautista suffered raw and bleeding arms from RZA's sandpaper-like prop iron fists during their fight scene.

=== Marketing ===
RZA launched an 11-date music concert called "The Iron Fists Tour" to promote the film in association with Rock the Bells and Guerilla Union. It featured performances by members of Wu-Tang Clan and other artists. The tour began on October 3, 2012, and visited several North American cities including New York City, Baltimore, Chicago, Los Angeles, and Las Vegas. An animated short film about the blacksmith's journey to China and his first meeting with Brass Body, which RZA narrated, was released on October 20, 2012, as a prequel to the film. 16 heavily stylized posters, each by a different artist, were placed in outdoor locations in several North American cities and were designed to allow pedestrians to remove and keep them.

The marketing campaign sponsored the 2012 BET Hip Hop Awards, star Bautista's debut mixed martial arts debut fight at Classic Entertainment and Sports: Real Pain in October 2012, and the release of the video game Assassin's Creed III. The film premiered in Los Angeles and New York City, and directly targeted minority demographics. RZA promoted the film at the Hispanic-owned Martial Arts History Museum in Burbank, California and an original Spanish-dub viral video was also released. RZA targeted African-American audiences by promoting the film on rapper Snoop Dogg's YouTube channel. An online awareness campaign included partnerships with Machinima Inc., hip-hop news site Global Grind, Ultimate Fighting Championship, IGN, and Spotify.

== Music ==
The film features music from The Black Keys, Kanye West, Wiz Khalifa, John Frusciante and Chinese singer Sally Yeh. RZA also developed new tracks based on excerpts from Wu-Tang Clan master tracks provided by Sony Music, and songs performed by William Bell, Isaac Hayes and Mable John, which Stax Records provided. Composer Howard Drossin wrote the original musical cues for the film.

RZA had not initially set out to score the film; he inserted temporary tracks of songs he wanted to use. After watching the temporary-track cut of the film, the music was found to be unsuitable, and it was suggested that RZA provide the music. RZA sought Tarantino's help with the score after he helped Tarantino with the score for Kill Bill. Tarantino also suggested RZA entirely produce the score. RZA and Drossin developed and finalized the score. They then developed the film's soundtrack, which was scheduled for release on October 23, 2012, and features 15 songs from the film including original songs by Kanye West, the Wu-Tang Clan, Talib Kweli, Ghostface Killah, Pusha T, Raekwon, and collaborations by RZA with The Black Keys and Flatbush Zombies. The character Jack Knife, who was influenced by rapper Ol' Dirty Bastard, has a theme tune featuring a jaw harp cue reminiscent of the artist's song "Shimmy Shimmy Ya." The blacksmith is represented by cues from Isaac Hayes' music.

== Release ==
The Man with the Iron Fists premiered on October 25, 2012, at Mann's Chinese 6 theater in Hollywood. David Bautista attended in a yellow spandex suit, which he wore as a tribute to Bruce Lee, who wore a similar outfit in Game of Death (1972). The film was released in North America on November 2, 2012.

=== Home media ===
The Man with the Iron Fists was released on DVD, Blu-ray and digital download on February 12, 2013, in North America. The DVD and Blu-ray editions contain the theatrical release version of the film, an unrated cut containing approximately twelve minutes of additional footage, deleted scenes and three featurettes: "A Look Inside The Man with the Iron Fists", "A Path to the East", and "On the Set with RZA".

== Reception ==
=== Box office ===
The Man with the Iron Fists grossed $15.6 million from North America and $4 million from other territories for a worldwide total of $19.7 million, against a $15 million budget. Pre-release tracking in North America for the week before release estimated that the film would attract a mostly male audience and would earn between $7 million and $10 million during its opening weekend. The Man with the Iron Fists earned $3 million during its opening day, and during its opening weekend the film earned $7.9 million from 1,868 theaters – an average of $4,235 per theater—finishing fourth behind holdover Argo ($10.2 million), and fellow new releases Flight ($25 million) and Wreck-It Ralph ($49.1 million). The largest demographic of the opening weekend audience was under 30 (53%) and male (64%).

=== Critical reception ===
The Man with the Iron Fists received mixed reviews from critics. On the review aggregator website Rotten Tomatoes, 52% of 83 critics' reviews are positive. The website's consensus reads: "Messy kung-fu homage The Man with the Iron Fists demonstrates a slavish affection for the genre it mimics, for better or worse." Metacritic, which uses a weighted average, assigned the film a score of 51 out of 100, based on 18 critics, indicating "mixed or average" reviews. CinemaScore polls reported that the average grade moviegoers gave the film was "C+" on an A+ to F scale.

Variety's Andrew Barker called the film endearing and engagingly enthusiastic, and said it is "more fun than it ought to be". Barker considered RZA's on-screen role to be too withdrawn to carry the central character role, but praised the supporting performances, especially those of Le's crime lord and Crowe, who Barker said "smirkingly goes for broke to an extent that viewers haven't seen from him since, well ... ever." Barker also praised the film's score, but was critical of the script's uneven tone. The New York Times's Manohla Dargis called it an erratically enjoyable product of a deep cinephile passion for the martial arts genre. Dargis praised Crowe's performance and Byron Mann's "gaudy baddie with heavy-metal hair and a psycho grin", but considered RZA's central role a mistake, saying "with his sleepy eyes and an affect so laid-back ... [he] is too recessive a screen presence to make the character pop, much less hold your interest". The A.V. Club's Nathan Rabin credited RZA's conceptualization of the "rich, bloody, dense universe he created down to the most insignificant details", and praised RZA's "powerful inner calm" and Crowe's "defiantly theatrical turn".

The Los Angeles Times' Betsy Sharkey called it a martial-arts spectacle that "may just be one of the best bad movies ever." Sharkey said that some uneven performances and lack of refinement were the result of RZA's lack of directing experience, but appreciated the choreography of the "extreme action" and the film's visual aesthetic, which she described as "a blend of French Baroque and ancient China". Sharkey said that the plot "goes seriously off-course" when expanding on the Blacksmith's history. The Hollywood Reporter's Todd McCarthy said that the film is "sufficiently well done and amusing enough to satisfy the appetites of fans who mainline this sort of thing," but considered that in directly acting as an homage to the genre, it lacked any stylistic inspiration or imaginative flair to reinvent it. McCarthy however praised the imaginative weapon designs, and the performances of Lucy Liu and Crowe. The Village Voice's Nick Pinkerton said "the action scenes are often too cluttered for legibility, and, curious to say of a movie made by a musician, the film has broad swaths without tempo", and added that it has a homemade charm that he found "curiously touching".

USA Today's Scott Bowles was critical of the film, awarding it 1.5 stars out of 4. He said that the film is "heavy on bloody kung fu action...and light on just about everything else", that it "doesn't have enough tension to be taken seriously, or enough laughs to be taken lightly", and called it "slick and hip". Bowles wrote that the film has "beautifully choreographed moments, and the action sequences won't disappoint any fans of slow-motion fistfights and arteries that gush like fire hydrants". Independent film critic Emanuel Levy wrote that Crowe's "commanding performance" and his chemistry with Liu lift the film slightly above the routine. Levy said that the film is an "ultra-violent movie that blends thrilling martial arts sequences, orchestrated and executed by some of the masters of this specific milieu, with a semi-involving tale" that would be appreciated by a young, indiscriminating audience. Leonard Maltin of IndieWire said that "RZA's understated performance isn't bad, but his staging of action leaves something to be desired", and that the film imitates earlier kung-fu films, which it fails to improve upon.

=== Accolades ===
The Man with the Iron Fists received nominations for Golden Fleece and Best Wildposts at the 2013 Golden Trailer Awards. Its song "Carry It" was nominated for Best Original or Adapted Song at the Black Reel Awards of 2013.

== Sequel ==
A sequel was announced by RZA in an interview with the title The Man with the Iron Fists: Sting of the Scorpion but revealed that he's not directing the sequel, instead Roel Reine will direct the film as RZA, Rick Yune, Zhu Zhu, Andrew Lin and Grace Huang will reprise their roles as the Blacksmith, X-Blade, Chi Chi and The Gemini Twins, joining the cast are Dustin Nguyen, Cary Tagawa, Carl Ng and Simon Yin. The sequel was released on DVD and Blu-ray on April 14, 2015.
