= List of gay characters in television =

This is a list of live action gay characters in television series (includes terrestrial, cable, and streaming shows). The orientation can be portrayed on-screen, described in the dialogue or mentioned. Roles include lead, main, recurring, supporting, and guest.

The names are organized in alphabetical order by the surname (i.e. last name), or by a single name if the character does not have a surname. Some naming customs write the family name first followed by the given name; in these cases, the names in the list appear under the family name (e.g. the name Jung Seo-hyun [Korean] is organized alphabetically under "J").

== List ==
Go to: A | B | C | D | E | F | G | H | I | J | K | L | M | N | O | P | Q | R | S | T | U | V | W | X | Y | Z |

=== A–D ===
Go to: A | B | C | D

Character	Portrayed by	Program	Notes	Ref(s)
Aaron	Ross Marquand	The Walking Dead	Aaron is the series' first gay male character, who has a partner named Eric.	
Agron	Dan Feuerriegel	Spartacus	In a relationship with Nasir.	
Sam Adama	Sasha Roiz	Caprica	Sam is married to Larry.	
Kenny Al-Bahir	Rami Malek	The War at Home	Next-door neighbor to the Gold family, and best friend of fellow teen, Larry Gold.	
Alex	Adam Faison	Everything's Gonna Be Okay	Nicholas' new boyfriend.	
Noah Alexander	Marcel McCalla	Footballers' Wives	Noah has a crush on the team captain, Conrad.	
Alistair	Finneas O'Connell	Glee	Spencer's boyfriend who joins the glee club.	
Drew Alister	Brendan Fehr	The Night Shift	A doctor.	
Wesley Alvarez	Rudy Martinez	Dear White People	Wesley and Lionel Huggins have a relationship in season two of the show.	
Blaine Anderson	Darren Criss	Glee	Blaine is married to Kurt Hummel.	
Heath Anderson	Zack Lively	Greek	He had several one night stands with Calvin. By the end of the series, Heath and Calvin are in a committed relationship and going to India together.	
Andrew	Craig Ferguson	Sean Saves the World	Andrew is Sean's former boss, who he slept with.	
Matteusz Andrzejewski	Jordan Renzo	Class	Has relationship with Charlie Smith.	
Titus Andromedon	Tituss Burgess	Unbreakable Kimmy Schmidt	An actor struggling on Broadway.	
Andy	Matt Bomer	American Horror Story: Freak Show	Andy is a prostitute who Dell Toledo fell in love with.	
Anwar	Chaneil Kular	Sex Education	Anwar is Nick's boyfriend.	
Lucas Apert	Stéphane Pitti	Osmosis	Lucas is a user of Osmosis, a beta dating app, that he hopes will help him with his boyfriend, and stop cheating.	
Kevin Archer	Gregory Michael	Dante's Cove	One half of couple, Kevin's partner on the island is Toby Moraitis.	
Phillip Ashcroft	Sean O'Bryan	Quantum Leap	A cadet thrown out of military school for being gay.	
Luke Ashton	Scott Neal	The Bill	In a relationship with Sergeant Craig Gilmore.	
Austin	Ryan McGuinnis	Ugly Betty	Justin Suarez is his boyfriend.	
Ron Bantz	Doug Ballard	Northern Exposure	One half of couple that runs a bed and breakfast, partner is Erick Hillman.	
Renly Baratheon	Gethin Anthony	Game of Thrones	Is in a secret relationship with Loras Tyrell.	
Barnes	Ernie Grunwald	Supernatural	At the end of episode "The Real Ghostbusters", it is confirmed that he is in a relationship with Demian.	
Thomas Barrow	Rob James-Collier	Downton Abbey	His past relationship with the Duke of Crowborough is revealed in the first episode of season 1 and his sexuality remains part of his story.	
Finn Barton	Joe Gill	Emmerdale	Finn reveals to Val Pollard that he is gay and has a crush on David Metcalfe.	
Dom Basaluzzo	Murray Bartlett	Looking		
Russell Baskind	Dan Montgomery Jr.	Wasteland	A soap opera star determined to remain closeted so as to not jeopardize his public status as a sex symbol.	
Noah Baxter	Law Thompson	Hollyoaks	Noah is a fitness instructor.	
Sean Beasley	Sean Maher	The Playboy Club	Sean is a gay rights activist.	
Rusty Beck	Graham Patrick Martin	The Closer; Major Crimes	In the season two finale, Rusty comes out to Sharon.	
Cyrus Beene	Jeff Perry	Scandal	Cyrus is married to James Novak, a political journalist.	
Ben	Bradley Cooper	Wet Hot American Summer: First Day of Camp	Ben and Susie are known by everyone to be an item, except that Ben is in a secret relationship with counselor McKinley.	
Ben	Adam Scott	Wet Hot American Summer: Ten Years Later	Ben and Susie are known by everyone to be an item, except that Ben is in a secret relationship with counselor McKinley.	
Jack Benjamin	Sebastian Stan	Kings	Jack is the closeted son of the king.	
Dr. Oliver Berg	Laurence Penry-Jones	Doctors	Oliver is in a relationship with physiotherapist, Alex, but also had feelings for Ben.	
Sol Bergstein	Sam Waterston	Grace and Frankie	Sol and Robert are a couple.	
Henry Best	Vincent Franklin	Cucumber; Banana	Henry is a middle-aged insurance salesman, happily settled with his boyfriend of nine years, Lance Sullivan.	
Ida Best	Caldwell Tidicue	Tales of the City	Ida manages a burlesque bar that both Shawna and Margot work at.	
Roy Biggins Jr. (aka R.J.)	Abraham Benrubi	Wings	R.J. comes out to his dad, who challenges him to a game of one-on-one basketball on the condition that if R.J. wins he is allowed to be gay, but if Roy wins R.J. is not.	
Erol Birkan	Fahri Yardım	Dogs of Berlin	Erol is a Turkish policeman.	
Kyle Bishop	Andy Mientus	Smash	Kyle was in relationships with Blake, Tom and Jimmy.	
Stuart Bixby	Derek Jacobi	Vicious	Stuart and Freddie Thornhill have been together for almost 50 years.	
Eric Black	Blake Bashoff	Judging Amy	A teenager who had been so badly abused that he was blind for two years.	
Billie Blaikie	Alan Cumming	The L Word	Billie is a party promoter.	
John Blaine	Art Fleming	Starsky & Hutch	John picks up a street hustler who drugs and robs him.	
Larry Blaisdell	Larry Bagby	Buffy the Vampire Slayer	Larry is a closeted and finally comes out to Xander.	
Richie Blake	Spencer McLaren	The Secret Life of Us	Midway through season one Richie realized he was gay.	
Stanford Blatch	Willie Garson	Sex and the City	A cosmopolite, married to Anthony Marentino. Liza Minnelli sang at their wedding.	
Max Blum	Adam Pally	Happy Endings	A man who had a relationship with Grant.	
Tony Du Bois	Lawrence Monoson	Touched by an Angel	Returns home to come out to his family and tell them he has AIDS.	
Dr. Simon Bond	David Sturzaker	Doctors		
Brad Bottig	Brock Ciarlelli	The Middle	Brad comes out in season 7 to his best friend, Sue Heck.	
Bouffant	Adrian Scarborough	Let Them Eat Cake	Bouffant is the private and flamboyant couturier to the Comtesse de Vache and representative of the Maison Bouffant.	
Edwin Bouwhuis	Raynor Arkenbout	Goede tijden, slechte tijden		
John Bowers	Kyle Clements	Doom Patrol	Larry's secret lover who also served in the Air Force.	
Drew Boyd	Matt Battaglia	Queer as Folk (US)	Drew was a closeted football player, who eventually came out.	
Brad	Henry Zaga	13 Reasons Why	After coming out, Tony said that Brad was his boyfriend.	
Brendan Brady	Emmett J. Scanlan	Hollyoaks	A sociopathic, self-loathing homophobe.	
Aaron Brennan	Matt Wilson	Neighbours		
Patrick Brewer	Noah Reid	Schitt's Creek	Patrick comes out to his parents in the season 5 episode "Meet the Parents", and later marries David Rose in the series finale, "Happy Ending".	
Brian	Graham Duff	Ideal	Brian has several boyfriends.	
Brian	Brant Daugherty	Days of Our Lives	Dated boyfriend Sonny Kiriakis.	
Tom Brisley	Adam Ray	Grange Hill		
John Irvin	Bill Brochtrup	NYPD Blue	Police officer dating a fellow closeted police officer.	
Rory Brown	Rory Cowan	Mrs. Brown's Boys		
Ben Bruckner	Robert Gant	Queer as Folk (US)	Married to main character Michael, has HIV.	
Bryan	Michael Galante	Good Trouble	Bryan lives in downtown Los Angeles and works as an event planner at the Standard Hotel.	
Russell Bryant	Jonathan Newth	After Henry	He runs the Bygone Books shop, where Sarah works.	
Steve Burdick	D. W. Moffett	Lifestories	A TV anchorman loses his partner to AIDS and is HIV-positive himself.	
Caleb Burford	Joshua Tan	Mystic	Caleb comes out to his friend, Issie.	
Billy Burns	Emerson Brooks	Uncoupled		
Will Byers	Noah Schnapp	Stranger Things	(Schnapp confirmed in a 2022 interview that Will is gay and in love with his best friend Mike Wheeler.)	
Conor Byrne	Glenn Mulhern	Family Affairs		
Benji Campbell	George Sear	Love, Victor	A teenager who works as a barista at the coffee shop where Victor works part-time.	
Roberto "Bobby" Cañero-Reed	Charlie Bushnell	Diary of a Future President	The brother of Elena, who starts to develop feelings for a man named Liam.	
Carl	Steve John Shepherd	Being Human (UK)	Carl is a vampire. He shares a flat with his human boyfriend Dan.	
Leon Carp	Martin Mull	Roseanne	Roseanne's boss at the diner.	
Doug Carter	PJ Brennan	Hollyoaks		
Hal Carter	John Cameron Mitchell	The Sandman		
Steven Carrington	Al Corley (left after season 2)	Dynasty (1981)	Self-identifies as homosexual. (He is among the earliest gay main characters included in an American television series. When Coleman took over the role, his change in appearance was explained by plastic surgery due to an oil rig explosion.)	
Steven Carrington	Jack Coleman (started in season 3)	Dynasty (1981)	Self-identifies as homosexual. (He is among the earliest gay main characters included in an American television series. When Coleman took over the role, his change in appearance was explained by plastic surgery due to an oil rig explosion.)	
Steven Carrington	James Mackay	Dynasty (2017)	Steven is openly gay. (Sammy Jo was a woman in the original series, but in the reboot was made to be Steven's lover.)	
Steven Carrington	Nicholas Cordts (teenage Steven)	Dynasty (2017)	Steven is openly gay. (Sammy Jo was a woman in the original series, but in the reboot was made to be Steven's lover.)	
Steven Carrington	Paul Luke Bonenfant (as a child)	Dynasty (2017)	Steven is openly gay. (Sammy Jo was a woman in the original series, but in the reboot was made to be Steven's lover.)	
Johnny Carter	Sam Strike; Ted Reilly	EastEnders		
Owen Cavanaugh	Dallas Roberts	The Good Wife	The brother of a lead character and had a boyfriend in the 2012–2013 season.	
Charles	Rhys Darby	A Series of Unfortunate Events		
Charley	Nick Pugliese	School Spirits	Before he died, Charley was in a relationship with Emilio Figueroa, who did not know Charley was closeted when he told his parents about the two of them.	
Jeremy Chetri	Varun Saranga	Wynonna Earp		
Johnny St. Clair	Richard Seff	The Rockford Files	A wealthy man that hires Rockford to retrieve his stolen art collection.	
Barry Clark	Gary Hailes	EastEnders		
Christian Clarke	John Partridge	EastEnders		
Oswald Cobblepot / The Penguin	Robin Lord Taylor	Gotham	Talks about his love for Edward Nygma.	
Deran Cody	Jake Weary	Animal Kingdom		
Paul Coker	Jonny Labey	EastEnders		
Stephen Colbert	Stephen Colbert	The Colbert Report	Implied to be gay in several episodes. (It was later confirmed on an episode of The Late Show with Stephen Colbert.)	
Buddy Cole	Scott Thompson	The Kids in the Hall	Commonly appears as a commentator delivering monologues directly to the camera about gay culture.	
Arthur Coleman	Laurence Luckinbill	Dan August	In line for a job with the government, Arthur kills his lover Norman Sayles to prevent him from exposing Arthur's sexuality during his background check.	
Jamie Collier	Daniel Anthony	Casualty		
Bryan Collins	Andrew Rannells	The New Normal	David Sawyer's husband, who is trying to start a family with him.	
Gordon Collins	Nigel Cowley	Brookside	British soap's first gay character.	
Sam Colloby	Jonathan Kerrigan	Casualty	He formed a strong friendship with Adam who was also gay.	
Conrad	Jeffrey Richman	Paper Dolls	Conrad is a hairdresser.	
Mark Conner-Healy	Ames McNamara	The Conners	In his first appearances, he cross-dressed and was unashamedly effeminate; in a later episode, he comes out as gay when a photo of him and his boyfriend goes viral.	
Major Lance Corcoran	Tom Hollander	The Night Manager	Corcoran, 'Corky' for short, is Roper's right-hand man.	
Micheletto Corella	Sean Harris	The Borgias		
Corey	Michael Johnston	Teen Wolf	Corey's boyfriend is Lucas.	
Eddy Costa	John Ventimiglia	Jessica Jones	Detective Costa is in a same-sex marriage and trying to adopt a child.	
John Cooper	Michael Cudlitz	Southland	A police officer.	
Alan J. Corbett	Dustin Milligan	Supernatural	Openly displays feelings for Ghostfacers team leader Ed.	
Chance Counter	Doug Spearman	Noah's Arc	Chance is one of four gay Black men in Los Angeles (The first series to feature an all-Black, LGBTQ cast).	
Kevin Cozner	Marc Evan Jackson	Brooklyn Nine-Nine	Captain Holt's husband.	
Ian Craig	Stephen Kennedy	The Archers		
Ryan Crane	Eddie McClintock	Felicity	Ryan comes out to his brother Noel, introduces him to his boyfriend, and announces they are having a commitment ceremony.	
Trent Crimm	James Lance	Ted Lasso	Journalist for The Independent; his sexuality is discussed during the third season.	
Crispin	Craig Zimmerman	Modern Family	One of Mitchell and Cameron's friends.	
Mitch Crumb	Fred Savage	Crumbs	A screenwriter who returns to his hometown after his Hollywood career failed.	
Hugh Culber	Wilson Cruz	Star Trek: Discovery	Is the partner of Paul Stamets.	
Roger Curbishley	Adam Rayner	Doctor Who	Has an affair with the footman Davenport.	
Jesse D'Amato	Dane DeHaan	In Treatment		
Vince D'Angelo	Bobby Cannavale	Will & Grace	Boyfriend and later Will's husband.	
Paul Dagdelen	Ole Dahl	Lindenstraße	Comes out to his parents when he is sixteen years old. After that he is in a relationship with Mika Arlen.	
Jodie Dallas	Billy Crystal	Soap		
Lieutenant Jim Dangle	Thomas Lennon	Reno 911!	He is open and sees no problem flirting with and trying to seduce straight men.	
Coco Davis	Charles Levin	The Golden Girls	Coco was the girls best friend, and only appeared in the pilot episode.	
Felix Dawkins	Jordan Gavaris	Orphan Black	The brother of the protagonist.	
Toby De Silva	Matthew Needham	Casualty	Toby was a general practitioner, and worked in the emergency department of Holby City Hospital.	
Guillermo de la Cruz	Harvey Guillén	What We Do in the Shadows	Guillermo comes out to his family in season four, episode seven ("Pine Barrens").	
Montgomery de la Cruz	Timothy Granaderos	13 Reasons Why	Monty is a closeted football player who becomes involved in a secret relationship with Winston Williams.	
Joscha Degen	Carlo Degen	Alles was zählt	Joscha is a football player and friend of Kai Seebach who hides his homosexuality in order to be pursue his career. After 200 episodes, he comes out to his team.	
Marco Del Rossi	Adamo Ruggiero	Degrassi: The Next Generation	In a relationship with Dylan Michalchuk.	
Kevin Delaney	Chad Donella	ER	Sixteen year old male prostitute suffers from blood clots.	
Michael Delaney	Chris Bruno	All My Children	Michael came out to his history class at Pine Valley High.	
Phil Delaney	Jason Merrells	Queer as Folk (UK)	A close friend of Vince and Stuart.	
Canton Everett Delaware III	Mark Sheppard	Doctor Who	Canton got the blessing of a president to marry his black fiancé in episode "Day of The Moon".	
Demian	Devin Ratray	Supernatural	At the end of "The Real Ghostbusters", it is confirmed that he is in a relationship with Barnes.	
Silas Dengdamoor	Lee Majdoub	Dirk Gently's Holistic Detective Agency	Panto's boyfriend.	
Marcus Dent	Charlie Condou	Coronation Street	Marcus started dating Sean Tully.	
Derek	Lukas Gage	Love, Victor	Derek is Benji's boyfriend.	
Derrick	Spencer Neville	Days of Our Lives	He flirted with Paul Narita on several occasions. He then played an important part in the developing gay love triangle involving Will Horton, Paul Narita and Sonny Kiriakis.	
Ted Dinard	Mark Withers	Dynasty (1981)	Steven Carrington's former boyfriend from New York City.	
Ted Dinard	Michael Patrick Lane	Dynasty (2017)	Steven Carrington's former boyfriend from New York City.	
Aaron Dingle	Danny Miller	Emmerdale		
Daniel Dixon	Chance Hurstfield	A Million Little Things	Daniel came out to his mother and sister in season 1.	
Eldridge Dixon	Dwain A. Perry	Good News	Eldridge enlists the pastor to help come out to his mother, but is surprised when his mother says she'd known that he was gay since he was nine years old.	
Rodolfo do Vale	Alejandro Claveaux	Nada Será Como Antes		
Richie Donado	Raúl Castillo	Looking	Patrick's boyfriend and love of his life.	
Jerry Dorfer	David Hyde Pierce	Dream On	During a bachelor party, Martin finds out that a childhood friend, Jerry, had a crush on him, and Jerry announces that his "first time" was with Martin.	
Ned Dorneget	Matt L. Jones	NCIS	He comes out in episode "Need to Know".	
Billy Douglas	Ryan Phillippe	One Life to Live	Billy comes out to Joey Buchanan. The character is the first openly gay teenager featured in a television series.	
Jack Downey	Tanner Buchanan	The Fosters	Shares a kiss with Jude.	
Dino Doyle	Gary Hollywood	Mrs. Brown's Boys	Dino is a hairdresser, and the partner of Rory Brown.	
Harry Doyle	Russell Tovey	Quantico	Openly gay CIA recruit.	
Jochen Drexler	Sylvester Groth	Polizeiruf 110	Chief inspector who has a one-night stand with his old colleague Ferdinand Frey.	
Scott Drinkwell	Ross Adams	Hollyoaks	Mitchell Deveraux is his boyfriend.	
Darryl Driscoll	Ray Stewart	Barney Miller	Recurring character, his partner is Marty Morrison.	
Carey Dubek	Drew Tarver	The Other Two	The lead character, and an aspiring actor.	
Kenneth Du Beke	Tony Maudsley	Benidorm	Kenneth is a hairdresser who doesn't apologize for his behaviour.	
Tom Duran	Eric Lutes	Frasier	Frasier unwittingly asks Tom, the station manager, out on a date during the second season.	
Richard Durban	Richard Bekins	Law & Order	A city councilman murdered by a colleague, a right-wing councilman.	
Paul Dutoit	Peter Freiburghaus	Motel	Chef de Service in the titular motel. The kiss he shares with the apprentice chief Peperoni in the episode "Dr schön Paul" was the first gay kiss seen on Swiss TV and caused a scandal.	

=== E–H ===
Go to: E | F | G | H

Character	Portrayed by	Program	Notes	Ref(s)
Eddie	Daniel Franzese	Looking	Agustín's boyfriend and later husband.	
Alex Edel	Ludwig Trepte	Deutschland 86	He works alongside Tim, an American G.I. based in West Berlin who is also gay.	
Russell Edgington	Denis O'Hare	True Blood	Russell is a manipulative, angry, vampire king of Mississippi who killed without abandon.	
Blane Edwards	Damon Wayans	In Living Color	Art pundit offers commentary filled with crude puns on books, films, and television.	
Eric Effiong	Ncuti Gatwa	Sex Education	Best friend of Otis.	
Arnold Eliot	Sam Schacht	N.Y.P.D. (1969)	A successful producer killed in his apartment.	
Hank Eliot	Brian Starcher	As the World Turns	Hank made television history in 1988 when he came out of the closet, making him the first gay male on daytime TV.	
Terry Eliot	Robert Desiderio	Trapper John, M.D.	A patient treated for AIDS.	
Grant Ellis	Gregory Michael	Greek	Calvin gets a new roommate and is assigned Grant, who comes out to him and at first is in a secret relationship with him.	
Russell Emerson	Richard Roundtree	Roc	On a visit home, Russell comes out and announces he is getting married.	
Robert Engel	Martin Armknecht	Lindenstraße	Partner of Carsten Flöter. Their kissing scene caused a controversy in Germany.	
Eric	Gus Kamp	No Good Nick	Eric kisses Jeremy in "The Big Mitt" and later tells him that his parents already knew he was gay.	
Georg "Käthe" Eschweiler	Claus Vinçon	Lindenstraße	Carsten Flöter was his partner.	
Gino Esposito	Shane McNamara	Neighbours	Gino owned the local hair salon.	
Damon Evangelista	Ryan Jamaal Swain	Pose		
Bernd Fabrius	Holger Stockhaus	Mit Herz und Handschellen		
Howie Fairbanks	Andrew Francis	The L Word		
Gabino Falcón	Alejandro Speitzer	Someone Has to Die	Gabino is a young closeted man in 1950s Francoist Spain.	
Tom Farrell	James Dreyfus	Gimme Gimme Gimme	Tom is a constantly out of work actor, who manages to get only bit parts, usually as an extra, on television.	
Dustan Farrow	Brandon Claybon	Danger Force	A team of kid superheroes in training help reunite a lost child named Ellis with his parents, Dustan and Justin Farrow.	
Justin Farrow	Tommy Dickle	Danger Force	A team of kid superheroes in training help reunite a lost child named Ellis with his parents, Dustan and Justin Farrow.	
Gavin Featherly	Tim Marriott	The Brittas Empire	Gavin and his partner Tim, were the first openly same-sex couple to ever appear in a British comedy on the BBC.	
Fabio Fedeli	Brando Pacitto	Baby	Brando wants to keep the fact that he's gay a secret.	
David Ferrán	Adrián Rodríguez	Física o Química	Despite his initial hostility, he ends up being Fer's boyfriend.	
Matt Fielding	Doug Savant	Melrose Place	When he comes out, he is physically assaulted and fired from work because of his sexual orientation.	
Jason Figueroa	Peter Rini	Orange is the New Black	Husband of Natalie Figueroa, assistant warden of Litchfield Prison.	
Leonard Finch	Al Weaver	Grantchester	Leonard is a closeted Anglican curate in 1950s England. He loves Daniel Marlowe.	
Don Finlayson	Joe Hasham	Number 96	He was a lawyer who had several boyfriends. Don was the world's first regular gay character to appear on a television show.	
James Finley	Andy Mientus	Gone	James is a computer hacker and part of Novak's task force.	
Oliver Fish	Scott Evans	One Life to Live	In a relationship with Kyle.	
David Fisher	Michael C. Hall	Six Feet Under	David often relied on Keith, an openly gay black police officer, to help him find acceptance and strength to take over the family business.	
Wesley Fists	Austin Crute	Daybreak	A self-styled rōnin, in a relationship with Turbo Pokaski.	
Christopher Fletcher	Rian McLean	Home and Away	The first openly gay character in the show.	
Matteo Florenzi	Michelangelo Fortuzzi	Druck	Student who initially struggled with his sexuality, but later comes out. Falls in love with trans boy David.	
Florian	Alex Rich	GLOW	Florian died from an HIV/AIDS-related illness.	
Carsten Flöter	Georg Uecker	Lindenstraße	His wedding with the character Theo was the first homosexual wedding in a German TV series.	
Fred Fonseca	Jimi Mistry	EastEnders	Fred and Mick become good friends, but despite their closeness, Fred feels unable to tell Mick that he is gay.	
Bill Forbes	Jack Coleman	The Vampire Diaries	He lives with his partner Steven, in Georgia.	
Jamie Forrest	Karl Urban	Shortland Street	Jamie is a paramedic, and the soap's first openly gay character.	
Aidan Foster	Bob Morley	Neighbours	Aidan is a love interest of Chris Pappas.	
Jonny Foster	Richard Grieve	Emmerdale		
Jude Adams Foster	Hayden Byerly	The Fosters	Jude develops romantic feelings for his best friend Connor Stevens, and they begin dating.	
Karl Foster	Chris Finch	Coronation Street	He was in a relationship with Todd Grimshaw.	
George Fraley	Peter Frechette	Profiler	Computer hacker and member of the Violent Crimes Task Force.	
Alonso Frame	Russell Tovey	Doctor Who	He hooked up with Captain Jack Harkness.	
Ferdinand Frey	Cornelius Obonya	Polizeiruf 110	Chief inspector who has a one-night stand with his old colleague Jochen Drexler.	
Tom Friendly	M. C. Gainey	Lost		
Hernando Fuentes	Alfonso Herrera	Sense8	His first date with Lito Rodriguez was spent at an art museum in Mexico.	
Luke Fuller	Billy Campbell	Dynasty	Has a relationship with Steven Carrington. Luke was killed in the "Moldavian Massacre".	
Bert Gaffer	James Broderick	N.Y.P.D. (1967)	Blackmailers target homosexuals, Bert cooperates with police to catch them.	
Ian Gallagher	Gerard Kearns	Shameless UK	Kash Karib is his long-term boyfriend, though he has a relationship with Sean Bennett, and an ongoing relationship with Micky Maguire.	
Ian Gallagher	Cameron Monaghan	Shameless US	Ian is involved in a sexual relationship with Kash Karib. Later he starts a relationship with Mickey Milkovich, and marries him.	
Mr. Gallant	Evan Peters	American Horror Story: Apocalypse	Throughout his life, his grandmother Evie Gallant has tried to make him the perfect gay.	
William "Butch" Gamble	John Goodman	Normal, Ohio	Gamble was an average blue collar guy who loved football and beer.	
Samuel Garland	Victor Garber	Tales of the City	An elderly man who volunteers with a group called Rainbow Readers.	
George and Gordon	Lee Bergere	Hot l Baltimore	Middle aged couple living together. One of the first gay couples to be depicted on an American television series.	
George and Gordon	Henry Calvert	Hot l Baltimore	Middle aged couple living together. One of the first gay couples to be depicted on an American television series.	
Michel Gerard	Yanic Truesdale	Gilmore Girls	Is planning to adopt a son with his husband, Frederic.	
Gilberto	Arlindo Lopes	Colônia	Brazilian television series. Lopes is forcefully committed to a psychiatric hospital in Minas Gerais in the 1970s.	
Sgt. Craig Gilmore	Hywel Simons	The Bill	The first openly gay Sergeant and police officer in the show's history.	
Gideon Goddard	Michel Gill	Mr. Robot	Goddard is Elliot Alderson's boss at Allsafe, a cybersecurity company. He is later killed by a Dark Army assassin in the season 3 episode, "eps3.8_stage3.torrent."	
Ethan Gold	Fab Filippo	Queer as Folk (US)	Violin player, had a short-lived relationship with main character Justin Taylor.	
John Goodwin	Neal Bledsoe	Smash	Tom is his new boyfriend.	
Cyrus Goodman	Joshua Rush	Andi Mack	Cyrus is in a relationship with TJ Kippen. (It is the first gay relationship on Disney Channel, and Cyrus is the first gay main character in a Disney series.)	
Elliot Goss	John Early	Search Party	Eliot is coming to terms with his sexual orientation. He is also a self-diagnosed narcissist who is particularly good at detective work.	
Grant	James Wolk	Happy Endings	Max's ex-boyfriend; they start dating again after they run into each other on Valentine's Day.	
Albert Grant	Matt Ross	Big Love	Having struggled with his sexuality, Albert develops feelings for Dale Tomasson.	
Neil Grayling	James Gaddas	Bad Girls	He's a master manipulator and will do anything to get the man he wants.	
Bram Greenfeld	Keiynan Lonsdale	Love, Victor	Simon's boyfriend, appears in episode 8 when Victor goes to New York.	
Eddie Gregg	Charles Levin	Hill Street Blues	Eddie was a prostitute whom Belker originally arrests, then befriends.	
Marshall Gregson	Keir Gilchrist	United States of Tara	He's out of the closet and not once do we see him shy away from who he is.	
Todd Grimshaw	Bruno Langley	Coronation Street	Son of Eileen Grimshaw, he is a junior partner at Shuttleworth’s Independent Funeral Services. (He is the program's first openly gay character.)	
Guinness	Henderson Wade	American Horror Story: Roanoke	Guinness has a biracial relationship with Edward Philippe Mott, a wealthy 18th century eccentric.	
Nate Gurney	Scott Haining	Waterloo Road	Nate is a former student at Waterloo Road. He falls in love with Josh.	
José "Joey" Gutierrez	Juan Pablo Raba	Agents of S.H.I.E.L.D.	An Inhuman recurring character who was revealed to previously have had a boyfriend.	
Naveed Haider	Gurjeet Singh	Ackley Bridge	He comes out in series 2, and has a short relationship with Matthew in series 3.	
Thomas Hamilton	Rupert Penry-Jones	Black Sails	Thomas is a relationship with Captain James Flint.	
T.J. Hammond	Sebastian Stan	Political Animals	T.J. is the first openly gay son of an American President.	
Adam Hampton	Lenny Clarke	The John Larroquette Show	Police officer Hampton comes out.	
Oliver Hampton	Conrad Ricamora	How To Get Away With Murder	A recurring character in a relationship with a law student named Connor.	
Tae-joo Han	Han Gi-chan	Where Your Eyes Linger	The sole heir of a powerful chaebol family, and in a romantic relationship with his bodyguard.	
Dr. Dennis Hancock	Vondie Curtis-Hall	Chicago Hope	Comes out to Dr. Shutt in the fourth season.	
NoHo Hank	Anthony Carrigan	Barry	He was revealed to be gay in season 3 and is in a relationship with Cristobal.	
Robert Hanson	Martin Sheen	Grace and Frankie	After having an affair with his law-partner Sol for 20 years they finally come out to their wives and children to marry each other.	
Derek Harkinson	Ian Lavender	EastEnders		
Harrison	Matthew Risch	Tales of the City	Harrison is Mouse's ex-boyfriend.	
Harry	David Anthony Higgins	Mike & Molly	He comes out after a failed date with a woman.	
Michael Harper	Gabriel Thomson	My Family	Michael comes out to his parents, and tells them that he has been in a relationship with a guy for some time.	
Shane Harvey	Michael J. Willett	Faking It	He has a boyfriend named Pablo.	
Ste Hay	Kieron Richardson	Hollyoaks	James and Ste have a sexual relationship.	
Ryan Hayes	Ryan O'Connell	Special	Ryan has cerebral palsy. He is also an unpaid intern at Eggwoke.	
Tom Heinrich	Roberto Capasso	Tatort: Love is Pain (Tatort episode)	In a relationship with Mike Majewski. After Heinrich is abused and accidentally put into a coma by his homophobic friends, Majewski begins to kill them out of revenge.	
Richard Heller	Logan Marshall-Green	24	Richard is revealed to be gay after being tortured for allegedly being a part of a terrorist organization.	
Alex Henley	Sam Jackson	Skins	He kisses Matty Levan in one episode.	
Mason Hewitt	Khylin Rhambo	Teen Wolf	Mason is dating Corey Bryant.	
Carter Heywood	Michael Boatman	Spin City	Carter is the minority affairs liaison.	
Lionel Higgins	DeRon Horton	Dear White People	A black student who struggles to find where he fits into university life.	
Jacob Hill	Chris Perfetti	Abbott Elementary	An elementary school teacher who is initially open with his sexuality but takes time before opening up about his partner with his colleagues and students.	
Erick Hillman	Don McManus	Northern Exposure	One half of couple that runs a bed and breakfast, partner is Ron Bantz.	
Louis Hines	John Fleck	Murder One	Police secretary.	
Father Kieron Hobbs	Jake Hendriks	Hollyoaks	Catholic priest who has an affair with student John Paul McQueen.	
Ken Hodges	Christopher Guard	Casualty	Clinical nurse specialist.	
Shane Hollander	Hudson Williams	Heated Rivalry	Closeted hockey player, in a relationship with his league arch rival Ilya Rozanov.	
Clayton "Clay" Louis Hollingsworth	Monte Markham	The Golden Girls	Blanche's brother, engaged to a man.	
Curtis Holt	Echo Kellum	Arrow	Curtis is the husband of Nick Anastas.	
Ray Holt	Andre Braugher	Brooklyn Nine-Nine	A commanding officer of the 99th police precinct.	
Emmett Honeycutt	Peter Paige	Queer as Folk (US)	Emmett is particular closest to Ted Schmidt, and notable for his airy witticisms and flamboyant fashion sense.	
Scott Hope	Fab Filippo	Buffy the Vampire Slayer	Scott came out in college.	
Will Horton	Chandler Massey	Days of Our Lives	Will is the second gay character to join the soap opera.	
Will Horton	Guy Wilson	Days of Our Lives	Will is the second gay character to join the soap opera.	
Howard	Hamilton Von Watts	Dharma & Greg	Dharma befriends Greg's poker buddies, and discovers that Howard has a crush on Greg.	
Dr. George Huang	BD Wong	Law & Order: SVU	Psychiatrist who works with the Special Victims Unit; his sexuality is briefly mentioned.	
Colin Hughes	Billy Harris	Ted Lasso	Footballer for AFC Richmond. He comes out during the third season.	
Kurt Hummel	Chris Colfer	Glee	Main character of the series. He is Blaine Anderson's boyfriend, and marries him.	
Bob Hunter	Tuc Watkins	Desperate Housewives	Bob and Lee move to Wisteria Lane.	

=== I–L ===
Go to: I | J | K | L

Character	Portrayed by	Program	Notes	Ref(s)
Ian	Kyle Riabko	90210	He has a relationship with Teddy Montgomery.	
Robbe IJzermans	Willem Herbots	WtFOCK	He is dating Sander Driesen.	
Shane Ince	James Midgley	Cutting It	Shane works as a senior stylist in the salon, and has a reputation for being catty.	
Jack	Denny Miller	Alice	Mel's friend Jack, an ex–professional football player, comes out to Alice.	
Jack	André De Shields	Uncoupled		
Kenny James	Gregg Binkley	My Name Is Earl	A recurring character in this show.	
Stanley James	Brooks Ashmanskas	Uncoupled		
Jared	Sam Pancake	Svetlana		
Bernard Jasser	Nathan Lee Graham	LA to Vegas	Bernard is a flight attendant.	
Geoffrey Jellineck	Paul Dinello	Strangers with Candy	He is in a secret love affair with Mr. Noblet, the history teacher.	
Jesus / Paul Monroe	Tom Payne	The Walking Dead	Paul, otherwise known as "Jesus," came out in episode "The Other Side."	
Steve Jinks	Aaron Ashmore	Warehouse 13	A Warehouse agent in Season 3.	
Joe	Steven W. Bailey	Grey's Anatomy	His partner, Walter, made guest appearances throughout the series.	
Jacob Joffe	Michael Goorjian	Chicago Hope	Nineteen year old Hasidic Jew comes out to his father.	
Lucas Jones	Ryan Carnes	General Hospital	A periodically recurring character in this drama.	
Sammy Jo Carrington	Rafael de la Fuente	Dynasty (2017)	Has a one-night stand with Steven Carrington.	
Stuart Alan Jones	Aidan Gillen	Queer as Folk (UK)		
Warren Jones	Jason Hughes	This Life	He regularly visits a therapist who encourages him to embrace his sexuality and tell his friends.	
Josh	Josh Thomas	Please Like Me	Dates several men throughout the series.	
Julian and Sandy	Hugh Paddick	Round the Horne	Julian and Sandy were notable for being two stereotypical camp homosexual characters in mainstream entertainment at a time when homosexual acts between men were illegal in the United Kingdom.	
Julian and Sandy	Kenneth Williams	Round the Horne	Julian and Sandy were notable for being two stereotypical camp homosexual characters in mainstream entertainment at a time when homosexual acts between men were illegal in the United Kingdom.	
Justin	Ryan Carnes	Desperate Housewives	Justin comes out to Gabrielle; he is also Andrew's first boyfriend.	
Kang-gook	Jang Eui-soo	Where Your Eyes Linger	Bodyguard to the sole heir of a powerful chaebol family, and in a romantic relationship with him.	
Kash Karib	Chris Bisson	Shameless UK	Kash is his only long-term boyfriend, and also his married boss. When Kash's wife finds out, she insists it remain a secret.	
Kash Karib	Pej Vahdat	Shameless US	Ian is involved in a sexual relationship with Kash, owner of the Kash and Grab, where Ian works.	
Dave Karofsky	Max Adler	Glee	He kisses Kurt, revealing his sexual orientation and has a short romance with Blaine.	
Richard Katimski	Jeff Perry	My So-Called Life	An English teacher at Liberty High School, and facilitates the Drama Club.	
Kay	Connor Krause	Die Pfefferkörner	Kay is a young footballer playing for HSV. He is blackmailed by his rival Vito who threatens to publicly out Kay.	
Major Bill Keane, MD	Ricky Schroder	The Andromeda Strain	Keene is a specialist trying to discover the secrets of a lethal pathogen.	
Kevin Keller	Casey Cott	Riverdale	Best friend of Betty Cooper, and close friend of Veronica Lodge.	
Emmet Kelley	Bryan Clark	Grace Under Fire	Grace's father-in-law Emmet comes out to her, and admits a 15-year relationship with his partner.	
Dennis Kemper	Bronson Pinchot	Sara	Dennis is a lawyer.	
Tom Kenderson	Alan Autry	Cheers	Tom is an old friend and baseball teammate of Sam, he announces in his forthcoming autobiography that he is gay. Sam is supportive of him, but the bar's regular customers fear that because of Sam's support of Tom, the bar will become a place full of homosexuals.	
Nico Kim	Alex Landi	Grey's Anatomy	Nico is a surgeon at Grey Sloan Memorial Hospital.	
Kimon	Levi Meaden	Olympus	Kimon is Lykos' scribe.	
Jude Kinkade	Brent Antonello	Hit the Floor	Jude is in a relationship with Zero.	
Brian Kinney	Gale Harold	Queer as Folk (US)	Brian is the soulmate of Justin Taylor.	
Nate Kinski	Meyne Wyatt	Neighbours	Nate has known he's gay from an early age.	
TJ Kippen	Luke Mullen	Andi Mack	Cyrus Goodman's love interest. (The first gay romance on Disney Channel.)	
Sonny Kiriakis	Freddie Smith	Days of Our Lives	Sonny is the first gay character introduced in the soap opera, and later had a romance with Will Horton.	
Jason Kirk	James Carlton	Emmerdale	He is the first openly gay man to appear in Emmerdale.	
Marty Kirkby	Shaheen Jafargholi	Casualty	A student nurse who becomes a permanent staff nurse.	
Ross Korolus	Justin Peroff	Our Hero	Ross is one of the best friends of main protagonist Kale Stiglic.	
Leo Kraft	Henning Baum	Mit Herz und Handschellen		
Kravitz	Griffin McElroy	The Adventure Zone	In a long-term relationship with Taako.	
Nate Kulina	Nick Jonas	Kingdom	Nate is a closeted MMA fighter.	
Martin Kurath	Jürgen Prochnow	Die Konsequenz	An actor who is imprisoned. In jail, he begins a relationship with the jail warden's son.	
Malcolm Laffley	Tuc Watkins	Beggars and Choosers	Malcolm is closeted.	
Jim Lahey	John Dunsworth	Trailer Park Boys	A former police officer who lost his badge after a setup.	
Lucas Lallemant	Axel Auriant	SKAM France	Dating Eliott Demaury.	
Inspector Dave Lambert	Barry Primus	The Streets of San Francisco	A detective who must come out to convict a drug kingpin.	
Paul Lambert	Mathew Bose	Emmerdale	A hotel event organizer and pub owner. His partner is Jonny Foster.	
Lane	Austin Crute	Call Your Mother	Jackie's best friend and roommate.	
Agustín Lanuez	Frankie J. Alvarez	Looking	Married to Eddie.	
Tony Larkin	Cleavon Little	Dear John	Tony comes out to John and tells him that he is in love with him. When John tells him they can no longer be friends, Tony makes a huge scene in a restaurant.	
Larry	Julius Chapple	Caprica	Larry is married to Sam.	
Joseph Lasile	Michael Arden	Kings	Jack's clandestine boyfriend.	
Dr. Robert Lawrence	Mark Benninghofen	Chicago Hope	A resident interested in specializing in neurosurgery.	
Michael Lawson	Neil Patrick Harris	Uncoupled	Michael is newly single in New York.	
Oliver Lawson	Kristopher Turner	This Life (2015)	Natalie's brother who comes home when he hears about her illness.	
Kyle Lendo	Sean Maguire	The Class	He is a first-grade teacher, and lives with his boyfriend, Aaron.	
Lenny	Tony Curran	This Life (1996)	Lenny and Ferdy end up in bed together.	
Leon	Andrew Langtree	Coronation Street	Leon is a bodybuilder, and in a relationship with Sean Tully.	
Leslie	Paul Wittenburg	Blossom	Joey gets a letter from his secret admirer, which turns out to be his gay teammate.	
Tom Levitt	Christian Borle	Smash	Tom is a composer.	
Duke Lewis Jr.	Skyler Maxon	Faking It	Duke was in the closet until his ex-boyfriend Shane Harvey outed him.	
Kyle Lewis	Brett Claywell	One Life to Live	In a relationship with Oliver.	
Will Lexington	Chris Caramck	Nashville	A hopeful country music star, he is attracted to other men. He remained a series regular.	
Alec Lightwood	Matthew Daddario	Shadowhunters	Alec is attracted to Magnus Bane, which helped him come to terms with his sexuality.	
Rick Lincoln	Luke Macfarlane	The Night Shift	He is Drew Alisters boyfriend.	
Omar Little	Michael K. Williams	The Wire	Omar is a stick-up man who robs drug dealers for a living.	
Mateo Fernando Aquino Liwanag	Nico Santos	Superstore	Mateo is a wholesale warehouse employee.	
Lloyd	Rex Lee	Entourage	LGBT Asian-Pacific Islander.	
Ollie Lloyd	Keiynan Lonsdale	Dance Academy	Ollie is a talented and arrogant dancer who dates fellow student Sammy Lieberman.	
Longinus	Kevin Daniels	Modern Family	Is one of Mitchell and Cameron's friends.	
Peter Lottmann	Gunnar Solka	Lindenstraße	Since 2004, new romance with Carsten Flöter. Peter owns the hair salon with his lesbian friend Tanja Schildknecht.	
Sebastian Love	David Walliams	Little Britain	Sebastian is an aide to the prime minister.	
Ford Lowell	John Ducey	Oh, Grow Up	Comes out after leaving his wife.	
Alan Lowenstein	Bryan Safi	Young & Hungry	In the season 2 finale, Alan marries Elliot.	
Lucas	Eddie Ramos	Teen Wolf	Lucas has a boyfriend named Ethan.	
Luciano	Filippo Scicchitano	The Ignorant Angels	Michele's friend and Riccardo's boyfriend.	
Luke	Lee Williams	Ideal	Brian's boyfriend in Series 3.	
Luke	Corbin Bleu	The Middle	In season 9 episode "The Other Man", Luke is involved with Brad Bottig.	
Lukewarm	Christopher Biggins	Porridge	An inmate who got his nickname from working in the prison kitchen and always preparing tepid food.	
Kevin Lynch	James C. Leary	Los Beltrán	One half of a couple, his partner is Dr. Fernando Salazar.	
Jamal Lyon	Jussie Smollett	Empire	Jamal initially has a boyfriend named Michael before having relationships with other men in the later seasons.	
Prince Lykos	Wayne Burns	Olympus	The Prince is in a relationship with Kimon.	

=== M–P ===
Go to: M | N | O | P

Character	Portrayed by	Program	Notes	Ref(s)
Country Mac	Seann William Scott	It's Always Sunny in Philadelphia	Mac invites along his cousin, Country Mac, in episode "Mac Day", where each gang member gets their own day to do whatever they want with no complaints from the others. When they visit a gym full of bodybuilders, Mac insists the gang help oil them up. Country Mac is happy to assist, revealing to the gang that he is gay.	
Macca	Drew Dillon	Hollyoaks	Macca tells Ste about his sexual relationship with Brendan.	
Eric "Mac" Macfarlane	Jonathan Welsh	E.N.G.	Mac came out to his co-workers and brother after threatened with being outed.	
Andrew "Macca" MacKenzie	John Morris	Neighbours	Is a builder who worked with Doug Willis.	
Mickey Maguire	Ciarán Griffiths	Shameless (UK)	In a relationship with Ian Gallagher.	
Danny Mahealani	Keahu Kahuanui	Teen Wolf	Is in a relationship with Ethan.	
Mike Majewski	Nils Hohenhövel	Tatort: Love is Pain (Tatort episode)	In a relationship with Tom Heinrich. After Heinrich is abused and accidentally put into a coma by his homophobic friends, Majewski begins to kill them out of revenge.	
Lev Malinovsky	Uriel Emil	Casualty	Lev opens up a dating app and reads a message from someone asking to meet up.	
Kit Mainwaring	Mark Wheeler	Dallas	J. R. blackmails Kit, the closeted son of an oil magnate, into marrying his niece, to unite two of the city's most powerful oil families.	
Nathan Maloney	Charlie Hunnam	Queer as Folk (UK)	He is a 15-year-old schoolboy.	
Donald Maltby	Philip Charles MacKenzie	Brothers	Cliff's best friend and a book editor.	
Alex Manes	Tyler Blackburn	Roswell, New Mexico	Alex, a disabled vet, is in a relationship with Michael Guerin.	
Mani	Navin Chowdhry	Sinchronicity	Mani is a doctor in a relationship with Jase.	
Vijay Maraj	Dante Scott	Degrassi: Next Class	He had a short romance with Tristan Milligan.	
Anthony Marentino	Mario Cantone	Sex and the City	Anthony is an event planner, and married to Stanford.	
Mark	Gil Cates Jr.	Doogie Howser, M.D.	Mark is Vinnie's college roommate.	
Scott Marsh	Nathan Brine	My Family	Michael's first boyfriend, after coming out.	
Ben Marshall	Charlie Barnett	Tales of the City	Mouse's love interest.	
Oscar Martinez	Oscar Nunez	The Office	Oscar is an LGBT person of color.	
Syed Masood	Marc Elliott	EastEnders	Parents disowned him after coming out to them.	
Mateo	Dickie Hearts	Tales of the City	Mateo is a deaf butler obsessed with cleanliness.	
Kevin Matheson	Russell Tovey	Looking	Has an affair with Patrick, one of his employees.	
Seb Matthew-Smith	Joe Serafini	High School Musical: The Musical: The Series	Seb is the partner of Carlos	
Noah Mayer	Jake Silbermann	As the World Turns	Noah is in a romantic relationship with Luke.	
Billy Mayhew	Daniel Brocklebank	Coronation Street	Has been in relationships with Paul Foreman and Todd Grimshaw.	
Ted Mayo	Michael Hitchcock	United States of Tara	A neighbor of the family.	
Ronny McCarthy	Tyler Ritter	The McCarthys	A man in Boston with a strict Irish Catholic family.	
Lee McDermott	Kevin Rahm	Desperate Housewives	Lee and his partner Bob are the first gay couple to move to Wisteria Lane.	
Mac McDonald	Rob McElhenney	It's Always Sunny in Philadelphia	In episode "Hero or Hate Crime?", Mac comes out and accepts that he's gay.	
David McDowell	Dan Castellaneta	The Tracey Ullman Show	David and his partner William raise their teen daughter Francessca.	
William McDowell	Sam McMurray	The Tracey Ullman Show	David and his partner William raise their teen daughter Francessca.	
Jack McFarland	Sean Hayes	Will & Grace	Longtime best friend of Will Truman.	
Luca McIntyre	Ross McLaren	Doctors	A dedicated nurse at The Mill Health Centre. He was in a car crash that killed his boyfriend, Billy Parker.	
Colin McKenna	Tuc Watkins	Uncoupled		
Jonathon McKenna	Kieren Hutchison	Shortland Street	A medical student.	
McKinley	Michael Ian Black	Wet Hot American Summer: First Day of Camp	Ben is in a secret relationship with counselor McKinley.	
McKinley	Michael Ian Black	Wet Hot American Summer: Ten Years Later	Ben is in a secret relationship with counselor McKinley.	
Louis McManus	Michael Urie	Partners	Louis is an architect.	
Jack McPhee	Kerr Smith	Dawson's Creek	He started a relationship with Doug Whitter.	
John Paul McQueen	James Sutton	Hollyoaks	One half of the supercouple, John Paul McQueen and Craig Dean.	
Raul Melendez	Carlos Gómez	ER	A paramedic and first gay character in series.	
Alex Mercer	Owen Joyner	Julie and the Phantoms	A ghost drummer who falls in love with a ghost skater named Willie.	
Antoine Merriweather	David Alan Grier	In Living Color	Art pundit offers commentary filled with crude puns on books, films, and television.	
Michael	Taylor Emerson	Oliver Beene	Variety refers to Michael as "the most flamboyantly gay 11-year-old in TV history."	
Dylan Michalchuk	John Bregar	Degrassi: The Next Generation	Marco Del Rossi's boyfriend.	
Michele	Eduardo Scarpetta	The Ignorant Angels	Was in a secret relationship with Massimo for a year before Massimo's fatal accident.	
Mickey Milkovich	Noel Fisher	Shameless (US)	Is in a relationship with Ian Gallagher, and then marries him.	
Nathan Miller	Jarod Joseph	The 100	In a relationship with Eric Jackson.	
Tristan Milligan	Lyle Lettau	Degrassi: The Next Generation; Degrassi: Next Class	He is in a relationship with Miles Hollinsworth III.	
Ben Mitchell	Matthew Silver; Morgan Whittle; Charlie Jones; Joshua Pascoe; Harry Reid; Max Bowden	EastEnders	Boyfriend of Paul Coker.	
Dean Monroe	Fisayo Akinade	Cucumber; Banana	A 19-year-old who works as an insurance trainee.	
Peter Montefiore	Peter Frechette	Thirtysomething	Peter has a one night stand with Russell Weller.	
Teddy Montgomery	Trevor Donovan	90210	Despite his romance with Erin Silver, he ended up realizing his sexuality after a one-night stand with Ethan, and has a recurring love interest named Ian.	
Travis Montgomery	Jay Hayden	Station 19	A firefighter.	
Toby Moraitis	Charlie David	Dante's Cove	One half of a couple, Toby's partner on the island is Kevin Archer.	
Buddy Morgan	Joseph Gordon-Levitt	That 70s Show	Buddy had a crush on Eric.	
Marty Morrison	Jack DeLeon	Barney Miller	Recurring character, his partner is Darryl Driscoll.	
Edward Philippe Mott	Evan Peters	American Horror Story: Roanoke	Mott, an 18th-century eccentric, has a biracial relationship with his servant, Guinness.	
Michael Mueller	Justin Louis	ER	Michael admits his partner has been beating him up.	
Patrick Murray	Jonathan Groff	Looking		
Steven Myron	Steve Agee	The Sarah Silverman Program	Sarah's neighbor and friend, who is dating Brian.	
Paul Narita	Christopher Sean	Days of Our Lives	The first love of long-time character Sonny Kiriakis and part of the first married gay couple on a US daytime soap.	
Nasir	Pana Hema Taylor	Spartacus	In a relationship with Agron.	
Steve Newlin	Michael McMillian	True Blood		
Dave Nice	Harry Enfield	Harry Enfield's Television Programme	In one of the episodes, Dave comes out.	
Nicholas	Josh Thomas	Everything's Gonna Be Okay	Nicholas is raising his two half-sisters in Los Angeles.	
James Nightingale	Gregory Finnegan	Hollyoaks	Was dating his ex-boyfriend, John-Paul McQueen, and had an affair with Harry Thompson.	
Chuck Noblet	Stephen Colbert	Strangers with Candy	He is in a secret love affair with Mr. Jellineck, the art teacher.	
James Novak	Dan Bucatinsky	Scandal	James is married to Cyrus Beene.	
Michael Novotny	Hal Sparks	Queer as Folk (US)	Marries Ben and adopts a teenager.	
Will O'Brien	Adam Sinclair	Mile High	A flight attendant who worked for a budget airline.	
Fearghal O'Farrell	Matt Lucas	Come Fly With Me	An air steward for a cheap airline.	
Maxxie Oliver	Mitch Hewer	Skins	Maxxie is a teenager who is proficient at several styles of dance.	
Reid Oliver	Eric Sheffer Stevens	As the World Turns	Dating Luke Snyder.	
Diego Olvera	Juan Pablo Medina	La Casa de las Flores		
Kenny O'Neal	Noah Galvin	The Real O'Neals	Sixteen year old Kenny comes out to his Catholic family.	
Colin Osborne	Mark Bonnar	Unforgotten	Colin is married to Simon Osborne.	
Simon Osborne	Charlie Condou	Unforgotten	Colin is married to Simon Osborne.	
Patrick Osbourne	Justin Hartley	Revenge	Was married to a woman, later it was revealed he is gay.	
Calvin Owens	Paul James	Greek	Calvin is closeted when he arrives at college, but eventually comes out.	
Max Owens	Jayson Blair	The Hard Times of RJ Berger	In the last episode he is caught kissing a boy in the school showers.	
Tony Padilla	Christian Navarro	13 Reasons Why	Tony tells Clay he's gay in the eighth episode of season one.	
Lord Alfred Paget	Jordan Waller	Victoria		
Ted Paige	Michael Byrne	Coronation Street		
Chunk Palmer	Christopher Jackson	Bull	Palmer is a former football player who consults with Dr. Jason Bull.	
Peter Panama	Vincent Schiavelli	The Corner Bar	First recurring gay character on American television.	
Chris Pappas	James Mason	Neighbours	Aidan is his love interest.	
Zane Park	Shannon Kook	Degrassi: The Next Generation	A football player.	
Lucas "Luke" Parker	Chris Brochu	The Vampire Diaries	Luke is a witch and student at Whitmore College.	
Michael Patel	Josie Totah	Champions	A teenager who moves from Cleveland to New York City to attend a performing arts school.	
Patrick	Teddy Sears	American Horror Story: Murder House	One half of a couple who owned a creepy home where Ben and Vivien now reside.	
Patrick	Michael Arden	Anger Management	A passive aggressive patient.	
Alexander Perry	Antony Cotton	Queer as Folk (UK)	Vince and Stu's friend.	
Robert Petersen	Patrick Güldenberg	Tatort	A police investigator, and supporting character in one episode.	
Bill Peterson	Richard Jaeckel	Carter Country	Bill is a teacher who comes out, and then gets fired by the school board, who passed a resolution banning gay teachers.	
Frank Pickle	John Bluthal	The Vicar of Dibley	He comes out during a broadcast on Dibley radio.	
Desi Piscatella	Brad William Henke	Orange is the New Black	Comes out to Piper Chapman.	
Craig Plager	Howard Hesseman	The Bob Newhart Show	Craig joins Bob's group therapy and comes out to the group, with mixed reactions from them.	
Wyatt Plank	Brandon Routh	Partners		
Turbo Pokaski	Cody Kearsley	Daybreak	The unhinged leader of the Jocks, and Fists' boyfriend.	
Spencer Porter	Marshall Williams	Glee	A football player who has a boyfriend named Alistair.	
Lance Powell	Ofo Uhiara	The Bill	A black police officer killed by a serial killer.	
Mitchell Pritchett	Jesse Tyler Ferguson	Modern Family	Married to Cam.	

=== Q–T ===
Go to: Q | R | S | T

Character	Portrayed by	Program	Notes	Ref(s)
Eric Raleigh	Jordan Woods-Robinson	The Walking Dead	Aaron's boyfriend. Woods-Robinson thanked LGBT fans before his character died.	
Martino Rametta	Federico Cesari	Skam Italia	Had a relationship with Niccolo Fares.	
Flaco Ramirez	Juan Castano	Tales of the City		
Blair Ramos	Mark Indelicato	Dead of Summer	A counselor at Camp Stillwater.	
Gavin Ramsbottom	Hugh Sachs	Benidorm	Gavin and Troy are married.	
Troy Ramsbottom	Paul Bazely	Benidorm	Gavin and Troy are married.	
Hank Ranavich	John Brennan	The Commish	A police officer who witnesses a gay bashing outside a gay bar.	
Tommy Rankin	Barry Miller	Baretta	Fourteen year old street hustler witnesses the murder of his friend.	
Hartley Rathaway	Andy Mientus	The Flash	A hearing impaired villain.	
Simon Raymond	Andrew Lynford	EastEnders	In relationships with Tony Hills and Steven Beale.	
Vaughn Redden	Kain O'Keeffe	Neighbours	He flirts with Aidan Foster and they later go on a date.	
Fernando Redondo	Javier Calvo	Física o Química	A student at Zurbarán High School. In a long-term relationship with David Ferrán.	
Dr. Dylan Reinhart	Alan Cumming	Instinct	Recruited by the NYPD to help capture a serial killer.	
Carlos Reyes	Rafael Silva	9-1-1: Lone Star	Carlos is a police officer in Austin. Love interest for TK Strand.	
Lafayette Reynolds	Nelsan Ellis	True Blood	In a relationship with Jesús Velásquez. He later starts a relationship with a vampire named James.	
Scott Rhodes	Edward Winter	Phyllis	Phyllis's boyfriend Scott comes out to her, but he wants her to pretend they are together to continue to pass as straight in front of his parents. Scott eventually comes out to them as well.	
Riccardo	Edoardo Purgatori	The Ignorant Angels	Michele's friend and Luciano's boyfriend.	
Richie	Oscar Montoya	Minx	Photographer of male nudes for the magazine. Helps promote the company's new explicit feminist magazine in the gay community.	
Rico	Felix D'Aluiella	Doctors	Married to Dr. Greg Robinson.	
Carlos Rivera	Bruno Campos	Suddenly Susan	Carlos pays a visit to his brother Luis, and comes out to him.	
Archdeacon Robert	Simon McBurney	Rev.		
Cameron Roberts	Peter O'Brien	Queer as Folk (UK)		
Ed Roberts	Lloyd Everitt	Emmerdale		
Dr. Greg Robinson	Ben Jones	Doctors	Married to Rico.	
Lito Rodriguez	Miguel Ángel Silvestre	Sense8	A famous actor in the closet, Hernando's secret boyfriend.	
Carlos Rodriguez	Frankie Rodriguez	High School Musical: The Musical: The Series	Carlos is the partner of Seb.	
Sal Romano	Bryan Batt	Mad Men	Closeted art director at Sterling Cooper.	
Marco Romero	E. J. Bonilla	Revenge	Nolan Ross's love interest.	
Silvio Romo	D.J. Blickenstaff	Dear White People	Silvio is a student at Winchester University.	
Ronaldo	Christian Barillas	Modern Family	Ronaldo is Pepper Saltzman's assistant and later husband.	
Fred Rooney	Dean Scofield	Archie Bunker's Place	Archie is determined to make Fred straight by setting him up with a woman.	
Colin Russell	Michael Cashman	EastEnders	In a relationship with Barry Clark.	
Frank Rutger	Gerald S. O'Loughlin	Too Close for Comfort	Henry invites Frank, his former chief petty officer, over for dinner and finds out that Frank is gay, and has been living with his partner for 25 years.	
Sandy Ryerson	Stephen Tobolowsky	Glee	He is revealed to be gay in season two.	
Agustus "Gus" Sackey	David Jonsson	Industry		
Dr. Fernando Salazar	Gabriel Romero	Los Beltrán	One half of a couple, partner is Kevin Lynch.	
Marco Salazar	Freddie Smith	90210	In a relationship with Teddy Montgomery.	
Victor Salazar	Michael Cimino	Love, Victor	A new student in high school, who comes out and dates Benji Campbell.	
Salim	Omid Abtahi	American Gods	Salim has sex with Jinn. He is closeted.	
Salim	Omid Abtahi	Sleeper Cell	A closeted terrorist.	
Pepper Saltzman	Nathan Lane	Modern Family	Is one of Mitchell and Cameron's friends.	
Jack Samuels	Colton Haynes	American Horror Story: Cult	Samuels is in a relationship with Harrison Wilton, and had a one-night stand with Kai Anderson.	
Michael Sanchez	Rafael de la Fuente	Empire	He is the boyfriend of Jamal, the son of a renowned record producer.	
Sanjay	Maulik Pancholy	Weeds	Sanjay comes out in the 2007–2008 season.	
Joey Santori	Joseph Cali	Trapper John, M.D.	A police officer shot during a gay rights rally.	
David Sawyer	Justin Bartha	The New Normal	Bryan Collins' husband, who is attempting to start a family with him.	
Falk von Schermbeck	Dick Martens	SK Kölsch		
Ted Schmidt	Scott Lowell	Queer as Folk (US)	Ted is uncomfortable with his age.	
Levi Schmitt	Jake Borelli	Grey's Anatomy; Station 19	He works at Grey Sloan Memorial Hospital. Gets together with Nico Kim in season 15.	
Scott	Fred Willard	Roseanne	Scott is married to Leon Carp.	
Colin Scott	Chris Finch	Waterloo Road	Colin works for a capital management company and is the boyfriend of Matt Wilding.	
Norman Scott	Ben Whishaw	A Very English Scandal	Norman was the secret lover of Jeremy Thorpe.	
Sean	Sean Hayes	Sean Saves the World	Sean is a divorced father with a 14-year-old daughter.	
Kai Seebach	Alexander Gier	Alles was zählt	A friend of Joscha Degen with whom he had a one-night stand.	
Ryan Shaver	Tommy Dorfman	13 Reasons Why	After coming out, Tony said that Ryan was his ex-boyfriend.	
TJ Shaw	Patrick Stafford	Major Crimes	TJ is a cell-phone store employee and the closeted friend/love interest of Rusty Beck.	
Philip Shea	Tyler Young	Eyewitness	Philip is a teen who moves to live with a new foster family.	
Kevin Sheffield	Ben Jorgensen	All My Children	When Kevin came out to his parents they disowned him and threw him out of their house.	
Benny Sherwood	Percelle Ascott	Wizards vs Aliens	Benny is a science student. He comes out to his best friend, Tom Clarke.	
Rick Silardi	Joseph Gian	Hooperman	A police officer.	
Dean Silverman	Gary Brun	Home and Away	Dean comes out and moves to the city with Gareth.	
Dillon Simmonds	Patrick Ward	Jamie Johnson	Dillon comes out in series 5 when talking to Elliot.	
Dennis Sinclair	Harvey Fierstein	Daddy's Girls	Dennis is a fashion designer. (Fierstein] is the first openly gay actor to play a gay main character.)	
Sir	Don Johnson	A Series of Unfortunate Events	Sir and Charles are a couple who operate a lumber mill.	
Isaak Sirko	Ray Stevenson	Dexter		
Charlie Smith	Greg Austin	Class	Charlies is an alien prince. (Doctor Who spin off)	
George Smith	Steven Roberts	Hollyoaks	In a relationship with Vincent Elegba.	
Sebastian Smythe	Grant Gustin	Glee	A character who has sexual interest in Blaine Anderson.	
Leo Snart / Citizen Cold	Wentworth Miller	Legends of Tomorrow	Citizen Cold is openly gay and in a relationship with the Ray.	
Luke Snyder	Van Hansis	As the World Turns	Luke is a teen who is in a romance with Noah.	
Mark Solomon	Matt Cavenaugh	One Life to Live	Mark is dating Justin.	
Charles Spad	John Harkins	N.Y.P.D. (1967)	Businessman and activist, helps police with blackmailers.	
Vito Spatafore	Joseph R. Gannascoli	The Sopranos	Vito is a closeted mobster.	
Robert Spencer	Morgan Stevens (Miniseries)	Bare Essence	Robert is dating Tim, a professional football player.	
Robert Spencer	Ted LePlat (TV series)	Bare Essence	Robert is dating Tim, a professional football player.	
Simon Spier	Nick Robinson	Love, Victor	Appears via voice-over, narrating messages to Victor. Appears in person in episode 8.	
Spike	Tom Vaughn	Hollyoaks	Spike is John Paul's first lover.	
Charlie Spring	Joe Locke	Heartstopper	Charlie is a year-10 student who was recently outed. He forms an unlikely friendship with classmate and rugby player, Nick Nelson, who later becomes his boyfriend.	
Brian Spukowski	Brian Posehn	The Sarah Silverman Program	Sarah's neighbor and friend, who is dating Steve.	
Hank St. Clare	Kevin Daniels	Sirens	Hank is ex-military and a sports fan.	
Marc St. James	Michael Urie	Ugly Betty	Has a relationship with Cliff.	
Paul Stamets	Anthony Rapp	Star Trek: Discovery	The partner of Hugh Culber. (First Star Trek character to be intended as gay from creation.)	
Stanley	Denis O'Hare	American Horror Story: Freak Show	Stanley is a con artist.	
Alex Stanton	Orlando Wells	As If	Has multiple romantic relationships, including a police officer, Dan, and a man named Mark.	
Clive Starr	Huw Bevan	Family Affairs	Clive suffered gay-bashing and homophobia from his older brother.	
Riley Stavros	Argiras Karras	Degrassi: The Next Generation	Captain and quarterback of the Degrassi football team.	
Ethan Steiner	Charlie Carver	Teen Wolf	He's romantically involved with Danny and later Jackson Whittemore.	
Steve	Philip Carey	All in the Family	An ex–professional football player and Archie's friend. He shocks Archie by telling him he's gay.	
Steve	Michael Ian Black	Reaper	A demon trying to destroy the devil through acts of kindness.	
Connor Stevens	Gavin MacIntosh	The Fosters	In season 2, Connor comes out, shares a kiss with Jude and the two begin dating.	
Clark Stevenson	Joey Haro	Awkward	Is in a relationship with closeted Ricky.	
Josh Stevenson	William Rush	Waterloo Road	A student and talented musician. After struggling with his sexual identity, he comes out in Series 6, Episode 4.	
James Stinson	Wayne Brady	How I Met Your Mother	He's the brother of Barney.	
Frank Stone	Colin Parry	Dream Team	Is outed as gay.	
TK Strand	Ronen Rubinstein	9-1-1: Lone Star	TK is in a relationship with Carlos Reyes.	
Sam Strickland	Leslie Odom Jr.	Smash	Boyfriend of Tom	
Justin Suarez	Mark Indelicato	Ugly Betty	Comes out by stepping onto the dance floor at a wedding with his boyfriend.	
Jimmy Sullivan	Harley Alexander-Sule	Unforgotten	Jimmy was the lover of Eric Slater.	
Lance Sullivan	Cyril Nri	Cucumber	Lance was killed off in episode six.	
Ben Sutherland	Robert Moore	The Mary Tyler Moore Show	Ben visits his sister Phyllis, Mary's neighbor, and comes out to Rhoda.	
Taako	Justin McElroy	The Adventure Zone	He is in a long-term relationship with Kravitz.	
Yosh Takata	Gedde Watanabe	ER	Yosh is a nurse.	
Justin Taylor	Randy Harrison	Queer as Folk (US)	Justin has an on-and-off open relationship with Brian, and had been with another romantic partner named Ethan for a short period of time.	
Ryan Taylor	David Paisley	Tinsel Town	His boyfriend is Lewis Reid.	
Pray Tell	Billy Porter	Pose	Pray is an HIV-positive ballroom MC and is afraid to share his diagnosis with others.	
Ray Terrill	Russell Tovey	Legends of Tomorrow	Revealed to be in a relationship with Citizen Cold.	
Terry	Alexis Cruz	ER	A street hustler who refuses treatment for AIDS.	
Dr. Ben Teverly	Paul Burke	Medical Center	A research scientist becomes the target of a smear campaign.	
Thomas	Sheldon Best	Manifest	Thomas fled Jamaica intending to reunite with his boyfriend later.	
Thomas	Ernst Hannawald	Die Konsequenz	The son of a jail warden who begins a relationship with actor Martin Kurath.	
Daffyd Thomas	Matt Lucas	Little Britain	He's the only gay in his village.	
Thomas	Jeff Seifer	ER	A patient with AIDS who doesn't want surgery, he later dies.	
Darren Thompson	Danny Horn	Emmerdale	Darren has HIV.	
Harry Thompson	Parry Glasspool	Hollyoaks	Harry is closeted.	
Jeremy Thompson	Kalama Epstein	No Good Nick	Jeremy comes out to his family in "The Box Job".	
Freddie Thornhill	Ian McKellen	Vicious	Freddie has been in a relationship with Stuart Bixby for almost five decades.	
Jeremy Thorpe	Hugh Grant	A Very English Scandal	Thorpe is a closeted homosexual who had affairs with men.	
Tim	Alex House	Degrassi: The Next Generation	Tim has a relationship with Marco.	
Michael "Mouse" Tolliver	Marcus D'Amico	Tales of the City (1993)	Mouse is the gardener and confidante of Laura.	
Michael "Mouse" Tolliver	Murray Bartlett	Tales of the City (2019)	Mouse is the gardener and confidante of Laura.	
Tony	Ken Marino	Reaper	In a relationship with Steve.	
Simon Trader	David Tredinnick	The Secret Life of Us	The bar owner.	
Larry Trainor	Matt Bomer	Doom Patrol	A superhero.	
Lionel Trane	Michael J. Willett	United States of Tara	Marshall's boyfriend.	
Panto Trost	Christopher Russell	Dirk Gently's Holistic Detective Agency	Silas' boyfriend.	
Ben Trueman	Michael Obiora	Hotel Babylon	Ben is the flamboyant front desk receptionist at the hotel.	
Will Truman	Eric McCormack	Will & Grace	He had a lot of romantic relationships, finally marries Vince D'Angelo.	
Cameron Tucker	Eric Stonestreet	Modern Family	Mitchell Pritchett's husband and Lily's adoptive father.	
Sean Tully	Antony Cotton	Coronation Street	He is close to Eileen Grimshaw. Has son Dylan with friend Violet Wilson through artificial insemination.	
Mickey Tupper	Paul Dooley	Dream On	Martin's dad comes out to him after Martin observes Mickey and his roommate acting like a married couple. Mickey later leaves his partner and moves in with Martin.	
Dennis Tyler	Paul Hilton	True Dare Kiss	Dennis runs a house for dogs.	
Jez Tyler	Matthew James Thomas	Britannia High		
Vince Tyler	Craig Kelly	Queer as Folk (UK)	A supermarket manager	
Mike Tynan	Joe Penny	Lou Grant	A detective who investigates a fire at a gay bar.	
Loras Tyrell	Finn Jones	Game of Thrones	In a secret relationship with Renly Baratheon.	

=== U–Z ===
Go to: U | V | W | X | Y | Z

Character	Portrayed by	Program	Notes	Ref(s)
Richie Valentine	Emun Elliott	Threesome	Alice and Mitch have a drunken threesome with their best friend Richie.	
Isak Valtersen	Tarjei Sandvik Moe	Skam	Came out in the third season and is in a long-term relationship with his boyfriend Even.	
Andrew Van de Kamp	Shawn Pyfrom	Desperate Housewives	Andrew is the devious son of Rex and Bree Van de Kamp. Justin was his first boyfriend.	
Erik van der Woodsen	Connor Paolo	Gossip Girl	He is outed by Georgina Sparks.	
Rickie Vasquez	Wilson Cruz	My So-Called Life	Teenager who was kicked out of his home due to his sexuality. (Cruz is the first openly gay actor to play an openly gay character in a leading role on an American network primetime television series.)	
Jesús Velásquez	Kevin Alejandro	True Blood	Lafayette's boyfriend.	
PC Jake Vickers	Jacob Ifan	Cuffs	Series protagonist who develops a relationship with lawyer Simon Reddington.	
Lukas Waldenbeck	James Paxton	Eyewitness	Lukas is a closeted teen living in a conservative small town.	
Dylan Walker	Eli Brown	Pretty Little Liars: The Perfectionists	A cello prodigy. Grew up as an out gay kid in a conservative small town, where he was bullied.	
Kevin Walker	Matthew Rhys	Brothers & Sisters	Lawyer, later married with Scotty Wallden.	
Gus Wallace	Rene Rosado	Major Crimes	Rusty and Gus fall in love, and begin a relationship.	
Joe Wallace	Jason Rush	EastEnders	Joe is a young chef who is HIV-positive.	
Connor Walsh	Jack Falahee	How To Get Away With Murder	A law student who is in a relationship with Oliver.	
Jackson Walsh	Marc Silcock	Emmerdale	In a relationship with Aaron Livesy.	
Jamie Walsh	Oscar Kennedy	Wreck	Jamie is in a relationship with Olly.	
Scotty Wandell	Luke Macfarlane	Brothers & Sisters	Kevin Walker's boyfriend and later husband.	
Chad Warwick	Zachary Quinto	American Horror Story: Murder House	The former owner of the creepy home where Ben and Vivien Harmon reside.	
Cliff Waters	Paul Regina	Brothers	Cliff comes out on his wedding day.	
Andrew Watson	Chris Uhlmann	Neighbours	A school teacher bullied by his students.	
Eliot Waugh	Hale Appleman	The Magicians	The king of a fantasy realm.	
Peter Webster	Christian Campbell	The Book of Daniel	Eldest son of Episcopal Reverend Daniel Webster. He is the victim of a brutal gay-bashing.	
Gert Weinbauer	Günter Barton	Lindenstraße	Partner of Carsten Flöter.	
George Weiss	Patrick Breen	Kevin Hill	A nanny.	
Russell Weller	David Marshall Grant	Thirtysomething	Friend of Melissa's who met while she was photographing a wedding. Russell has a one night stand with Peter Montefiore.	
Andrew Wells	Tom Lenk	Buffy the Vampire Slayer	Andrew is a member of the Trio, and is able to summon and control various demons.	
Ross Werkman	Mitchell Anderson	Party of Five	Music teacher, made TV history by adopting a baby.	
Jackson West	Titus Makin Jr.	The Rookie	Jackson is in a relationship with Gino Brown, a hospital nurse.	
Jason West	Robert Wilfort	Gavin & Stacey		
Ben Wester	Esteban Powell	Beverly Hills, 90210	Ben is a teenager, thrown out of the house, living in the car wash garage, where he is befriended by David Silver.	
George Weston	Richard Ely	M*A*S*H	George tells Hawkeye that he was beaten up by soldiers from his unit after he got drunk and inadvertently admitted to being gay.	
Lawrence White	John Bowe	Emmerdale	Patriarch of the White family and owner of Home Farm. Had a secret affair with Harold Birch in the early 1960's that resulted in imprisonment, where he was subjected to aversion therapy to cure his homosexuality.	
Edgar Wield	David Royle	Dalziel and Pascoe	A detective sergeant.	
Terry Wilcox	Rob Youngblood	Coach	Terry comes out to Hayden's daughter. When Hayden finds out that one of his players is gay, he has a hard time treating him like one of the guys.	
Matt Wilding	Chris Geere	Waterloo Road	A closeted gay musician.	
Winston Williams	Deaken Bluman	13 Reasons Why	In relationship with Monty, a closeted football player.	
Willie	Booboo Stewart	Julie and the Phantoms	A ghost skater who falls in love with a ghost drummer named Alex.	
Josh "White Josh" Wilson	David Hull	Crazy Ex-Girlfriend	A hyper-masculine, fitness-obsessed personal trainer at a 24-hour gym.	
Josh Wilson	Justin Chatwin	Weeds	He is a weed dealer, and having an affair with an older man.	
Harrison Wilton	Billy Eichner	American Horror Story: Cult	He has a relationship with Jack Samuels.	
Glen Wingfield	Richard Chamberlain	Desperate Housewives	Lynette's stepfather. He comes out, revealing the real reason he left her mother 20 years ago.	
Doug Witter	Dylan Neal	Dawson's Creek	Has a relationship with Jack McPhee.	
Mr. Wolfe	Rex Lee	Suburgatory	Mr. Wolfe came out halfway through the show's first season.	
Dr. Asher Wolke	Noah Galvin	The Good Doctor	He is a former Hasidic Jew, who became an atheist after leaving his community.	
Brett Young	Sean Grandillo	The Real O'Neals	Kenny's first boyfriend.	
Zeke	Brian Byers	Family	After Zeke gets arrested in a raid on a gay bar, his father throws him out, and Doug and Kate take him in.	
Zero	Adam Senn	Hit the Floor	Zero is in a relationship with Jude.	
Officer Zitelli	Dino Natali	Barney Miller	Someone wrote an anonymous letter threatening to reveal that one of the cops is gay, Zitelli tells Miller it's him.	

== See also ==
- List of feature films with gay characters
- List of lesbian characters in television
- List of bisexual characters in television
- List of transgender characters in television
- List of LGBT characters in radio and podcasts
- List of comedy television series with LGBT characters
- List of dramatic television series with LGBT characters: 1960s–2000s
- List of LGBT characters in soap operas
- List of reality television programs with LGBT cast members
