= Jude and Zero =

Fictional characters

- Hit the Floor characters
- Brent Antonello as Jude (left) and Adam Senn as Zero (right)
- First appearance: "Game Changer" (2014)
- Last appearance: Zero: "Til Death Do Us Part" (2016); Jude: "Final Seconds" (2018)
- Portrayed by: Brent Antonello; Adam Senn

In-universe information
- Full name: Jude Kinkade; Zero a.k.a. Gideon (surname unknown)
- Occupation: Jude: Sports agent/Devils EVP; Zero: NBA basketball player
- Relatives: Jude: Oscar Kinkade (father); Zero: Laura (sister); Leo and Carla (foster parents); Oscar Kinkade (father-in-law)

Jude Kinkade and Zero are fictional characters from the VH1 series Hit the Floor, which chronicles the off-the-court drama surrounding a fictional professional basketball team, the Los Angeles Devils. Introduced in the 2014 season two premiere episode "Game Changer", Zero (Adam Senn) is a devious new addition to the Devils from a rival Ohio team, and Jude (Brent Antonello) is the junior agent assigned to him. Jude is also the estranged son of the Devils' unscrupulous owner, Oscar Kinkade (Don Stark). Jude and Zero's working relationship soon evolves into a sexual and then romantic one, which continues for two seasons until the series was cancelled by VH1 in 2016. Hit the Floor was later picked up by BET for a fourth season to air in 2018, with only Antonello returning. After the series cancellation after season four, creator James LaRosa revealed the official conclusion of their storyline: Zero returned to L.A and he and Jude rekindled their relationship, married, and had children via surrogacy.

Fans and the press sometimes refer to the duo by the portmanteau "Zude".

== Development ==
In its 2014 second season, Hit the Floor introduced Adam Senn as devious forward Zero, and Brent Antonello as his junior agent, Jude Kinkade. Series creator James LaRosa described the season's three new characters—Jude, Zero, and Lionel Davenport (Jodi Lyn O'Keefe)—as "all twisted in their own way." At one point, LaRosa called Jude "the prime suspect in Olivia's murder", and Senn began to suspect that Zero might be the killer.

Though Zero initially has an affair with scheming Devil Girls captain Jelena Howard (Logan Browning) and rebuffs a kiss from Jude, Zero's jealousy over Jude's interest in photographer's assistant Danny (Scott Evans) prompts Zero to kiss Jude in "Unguarded". This twist was a surprise to viewers. Senn and Antonello were also unaware that their characters would become romantically involved when they joined the show. Antonello said, "midway through the season, we found out where the storyline was going between me and Zero. Adam and I were stoked about it ... you've seen the gay characters on TV and they don't have the relationships or anything like that." LaRosa wanted to give Jude and Zero full lives like other characters on the show, in contrast to Melrose Place's gay character Matt Fielding, who LaRosa said "was always holding someone's hair back and giving them tea and advice." With Jude and Zero positioned as frontburner characters, LaRosa explained, "Everyone has a motive, everyone has an agenda. Jude and Zero are no different. And they don't have some isolated story off to the side: They're scheming, they’re making bad decisions." Additionally, the sex scenes between Jude and Zero—which David-Elijah Nahmod of Echo Magazine called "startlingly no-holds-barred"—are as explicit as those of the heterosexual couples on the show. LaRosa said:

In that [first] episode where Jude and Zero had sex, we had a sex scene with Jelena and Terrence as well, and it was just as hot. They were both each treated exactly the same. To Brent and Adam's credit, I was like, "Okay, we're going to shoot this scene, and you can't be pussies." If Logan and Rob, who play Jelena and Terrence, are going to yank each other's clothes up and hold them up against walls and pull down zippers with their teeth ... I mean, you guys have got to get in the game! So, you had that first little kiss in the beginning, then they back off and then they attack each other and it's on! Belts are off, shirts are off and we melted the Internet.

The characters become involved in a sexual relationship that hits a crossroads when Jude demands a level of commitment that Zero is not ready to give. Antonello explained, "Jude basically puts his foot down and fights for what he wants, telling Zero, 'I can't be with you unless you come out as the gay man I fell in love with, not this star basketball player with a religious facade.'" With Zero not comfortable making their relationship public, Jude ends it. LaRosa explained:

With Jude and Zero ... I knew that their story wasn't just a "we're a secret couple" story. I think there is a reality to the fact that sometimes as a gay person you can be with someone else who is either gay or bisexual or just not sure or not admitting [it] ... I think that's reality ... But to me, it was more. I couldn't live in that world very long as a storyteller because I think then it gets depressing. I think then you're really telling a story about shame and you're exploring all the negative aspects and confusion around sexuality, when really that's not what the story was about. Zero had been with men and women. It's not like he was like, "I can't, I'm not macho..." that was never really his thing. His thing was about letting people in and being himself and taking off the mask.

The relationship also creates a complication for Jude when his father finds out, and basically disowns him. LaRosa said of the scene, "That was so terrible to film ... it was terrible to write. At the table read, there were a few actors who actually teared up. Don Stark, who plays Oscar, is one of the nicest, kindest people that you will ever meet, and he plays such a scumbag on the show and he did not like filming that scene. Afterwards, he said to me, 'I've murdered people on camera. I've had people killed, including on this show and that was the hardest thing I've ever had to do.'" Antonello recalled, "I remember Don breaking down and just saying, 'I can't imagine saying that to my daughters'."

In season three, Zero is threatened when Jude begins dating another sports agent, Lucas (Jonathan Bennett). Bennett said of the storyline, "it's a different look at people's lives. I don't think it's something audiences have seen before." Jude and Zero give into their desires and have sex, but Zero is still not ready to go public, so Jude walks away. Senn described the season as "riveting, fun and groundbreaking, with great character dynamics." Jude dating Lucas becomes a catalyst for Zero to decide how important Jude is to him. In "Good D", Zero says "I love you", but Jude answers that "love isn't enough." Soon after, Zero comes out by kissing Jude on the basketball court in front of millions of people, in what The Advocate called a "jaw-dropping episode". LaRosa said, "their story [of] him coming out in the big dramatic way he did, for me was always kind of the beginning of their story. It was an opportunity to go to the next level." Of the chemistry between Jude and Zero, Senn credited his real-life friendship with Antonello, saying "Brent and I right away both got along as friends. When we found out about the storyline, we made a pact that we would approach these characters 110% and do them justice and tell this story that deserves to be told." He also said, "As with any role, no matter the sex, you have to find a relationship with the two characters. [Brent] and I spent a good amount of time together working on the characters and their dynamic and hanging out and being friends in general. Regardless of any actor I'm playing opposite, if there is a love dynamic, you better believe there is a spark and there's emotion behind it." Senn also credited LaRosa for helping him and Antonello "fully commit to the characters".

The season three finale "Possession" leaves Jude and Zero's relationship in limbo following Jelena's declaration that she intends to trade Zero to another team. On April 1, 2016, an hour-long special was announced for Hit The Floor to resolve the cliffhangers raised. In the episode, which aired in September 2016, Zero's trade is dropped and the men are left happily in love, and together. On April 27, 2017, it was announced the series would move to BET for its future seasons. LaRosa said in October 2017 that Senn would not be returning for season 4 on BET. He wrote of Senn's departure (with Taylour Paige, who plays Ahsha Hayes):

For those asking, unfortunately yes, Taylour Paige and Adam Senn will not be a part of #HitTheFloor for S4. No one loves Dersha and Zude more than I do so trust me when I say I feel your pain. I care too much about these relationships to recast. I also respect the contributions of Taylour and Adam too much to see anyone else in the roles. Please know the following: Derek and Jude are in my protective care. S4 will be huge turning points for them ... I care too much about LGBT storylines for them not to continue to be a big part of the show. That's just who we are.

La Rosa told Entertainment Tonight, "We absolutely love Zero, we love Adam who plays Zero. Adam had a different path that he wanted to take, other things that he wanted to do, but I was very excited that Brent was able and happy and thrilled to come back and .. I've rewarded him with a killer story which will allow the audience to experience Jude in a totally new way." In April 2018, a promo for season four showed Jude in an intimate embrace with reporter Noah (Kristian Kordula), and a preview trailer released in June 2018 included a clip of Jude and Noah kissing. Noah is a new sideline reporter for the Devils, and an employee of the sports network now owned by Lionel.

== Characterization ==
Zero is cocky and egotistical from the start, going after what he wants in a straightforward—though devious—manner. Jude is more understated in his determination to impress his father any way he can. Senn described Zero as a "bisexual sociopath", noting that "Zero is a different person with every character", and said, "He's always thinking about the future, never living in the present. He's always 'how to get from point A to point B' and then even before he gets to B he's already thinking about C. He's wondering how far he can play the game." Zero's primary goal after his arrival is to become the team's star player. Senn told Out of Zero, "He always wants to be the best and keep people under his thumb."

Initially, Jude and Zero have mostly separate storylines and are not romantically linked, and Zero begins an affair with Devil Girls captain Jelena in "Passing", the second episode of season two. Of Jude and Zero's sexual relationship, Senn said, "I found out the storyline three or four episodes in, and the way it came up, was pretty organic. It made Zero so much more dynamic. [Him] now being bisexual has added so many more layers to the character". He explained that the relationship with Jude "isn't just about sex. It's definitely about the camaraderie of having a friend, the one and only person that Zero felt like he could trust ... the beauty of those characters is playing with that dynamic and not making it just about being gay or being bi or anything. It's a relationship and I think we're just going to discover more as time goes on." VH1 has explained that the relationship between Jude and Zero is a catalyst for both of them to grow and evolve. Farid ul-Haq of The Geekiary wrote that Jude and Zero are "well developed characters, and their sexuality isn't their only defining characteristic", adding:

The relationship that starts out as "messing-around-for-fun" changes into something real in the finale of season two. Jude and Zero are two sides of the same coin, and that's why they are perfect together. Jude starts out as someone who tries to reach out to people hoping they would reach back. Even his father disowns him when he finds out about his sexuality. However, as the season progresses, Jude starts to become more sure of himself and what he wants in life. His relationship with Zero makes him realize his self-worth. Zero is a character who is always thinking of succeeding in life. While Jude likes to take things as they come, Zero is always thinking about the future. He manipulates people to get what he wants. He also doesn't do relationships. However, Jude starts to penetrate the shell and sees Zero for who he really is. Jude's the only person Zero has told his real name to.

Jude's ultimatum in season two prompts Zero to open up a little, telling Jude that his real name is Gideon, which is his way of saying "I don't want you to go." Senn explained that in that moment, "Zero is still in his own world and has this urge to be right and not to be proven wrong. So he's listening to everything [Jude] says and everything is just bouncing off ... At the end when he says his real name there's a glimmer of hope, but he still has a long way to go." Afterward, Out described Zero as "withdrawn", noting that the character is not yet ready to be open about his sexuality. By comparison, Jude is unwilling to remain in a relationship he has to hide. Senn noted, "I think Jude's got [Zero] figured out. Jude is at peace with himself and who he is, which is awesome, and Brent does such a good job of playing the groundedness of where Jude stands. Hopefully Zero can get to that point sometime next season ... it would be nice if Zero found himself and was confident with who he really is. Whether that's with guys, with girls or by himself ... just being grounded and not trying to live up to everyone else's expectations." Senn later said that in season three, "Zero will battle with his own inner demons. There might be more of Zero's history, where he came from." Zero reveals to Jude that he has been affected by the fact that his foster parents only fostered for the money, and dubbed him "Zero" derisively.

Antonello said that as season three begins, "Jude's falling for Zero, without a doubt. I think you can see that without any dialogue—just the way that he looks at him. And I feel like Zero could possibly be heading that direction, but we'll see. We'll find out." He added, "I feel like Jude saw something in Zero when he realized that Zero wasn't going to take him down when he heard about [Jude giving] cocaine to Derek [in "Sudden Death"]. I think that was a sign. I would see trustworthiness in a person if they were to do that. LaRosa said, "The one piece of dialogue that I feel like defines Jude completely as a character is when he said, 'I keep reaching for people. Just once, I want somebody to reach back.' To me, that's the heartbreaking part of Jude, because he didn't grow up with a father ... He's always been just trying to get somebody's love and attention, and then along comes Zero, who's buying him sports cars and saying, 'Are you Team Zero?' And here's somebody who is kind of f*cked up just like Jude is." LaRosa added, "Jude's not a dumb character, he's an opportunist. He supplied Derek with coke to get on his good side and to work his way into the arena. He's a smart guy. Smart people fall in love with the wrong people, too, though. So it remains to be seen what will happen with Jude. But I like the fact that both Jude and Zero are smart." In 2016, LaRosa said of Jude and Zero:

Frankly, they're our most functional couple. They have each other's backs, they plot together, they have great chemistry ... when somebody steps out of line they're the first person to yank them back, if someone steps to one of them the other one protects them ... And we've gotten to learn more about them as individuals, and I think sometimes when you couple up characters it becomes all about these two people and particularly ... when it comes to gay relationships ... that's basically what they get boiled down to is they're the gay couple. Once Zero did what he did on the court and came out, that's when you really started to get deeper into Jude's feelings about his father and Zero's backstory ... And they're there for each other throughout that.

== Storylines ==
=== Season 2 (2014) ===
In "Game Changer", LA Devils owner Oscar Kinkade has signed Zero, a cocky forward from a rival team in Ohio. While Zero makes advances toward Devil Girls captain Jelena Howard, recent ex-girlfriend of team captain Terrence Wall, Zero's junior agent Jude wants only to impress his estranged father: Oscar. To this end, Jude moves to have coach Pete Davenport's wife, the famous actress Lionel Davenport, present at all of the Devils' games, but she will only agree if Pete is no longer dating Raquel Saldana. In "Passing", Jude manages to drive a wedge between Pete and Raquel, and Jelena finally gives in to Zero's advances and has sex with him. Zero and Jelena continue sleeping together in "Behind the Back", but she resists his romantic overtures. Jude and Lionel sour Pete and Raquel's plans for a weekend getaway. In "Full-Court Press", Zero goes to assistant coach German Vega with plays that he says would guarantee the team more wins, but would feature more of Zero and less of Derek Roman. Jude is revealed to have one of Olivia Vincent's red blackmail envelopes. In "Shattered Glass", Jude discovers that Olivia was also blackmailing his other client Derek; she knew that he tested positive for cocaine, and that Jude provided it for him. Zero sleeps with a pair of prostitutes. In "Blow Out", Zero helps Jelena dig up dirt on her nemesis Sloane Hayes, which includes his posing nude in exchange for an embarrassing photo of Sloane. Raquel convinces Jude not to submit her to a background check. Zero gives Jelena an ultimatum to choose him or Terrence in "Isolation", and Jude discovers that Sloane and Raquel want to take Oscar down. In "Playing Dirty", Jude demands that Sloane and Raquel give him what they have on Oscar, or he will tell his father that they are plotting against him. Zero threatens to purposely sabotage the Devils' chance at a championship ring if Jelena does not choose him over Terrence. Zero makes Jude his only agent, and buys him a sportscar. In retaliation for Zero's threats, Jelena destroys Zero's religious image by leaking information about his dalliances with prostitutes to the press, and he loses all of his sponsors. Raquel and Sloane turn the tables on Jude when they find out that he was being blackmailed by Olivia, and why. Jude promises to stand by Zero and help him navigate the scandal. Jude interprets an intimate moment between them as a romantic advance, and kisses Zero.

Zero pulls away in "Unguarded", supportive of Jude's apparent homosexuality but not interested. Jude explains to Zero that he kissed him because he thought Zero wanted him to. When Jude moves to meet up with another guy, a jealous Zero kisses him, and they have sex. In "Steal", Zero tells Jude that he has been with both men and women before, but does not do relationships. Jude wants to know what they are doing, and Zero says "having fun". Jude tells Lionel that he is seeing another man, and the revelation that Jude is gay cements a bond with Lionel. Meanwhile, Zero steps up his plan to supplant Terrence and Derek by giving reporter Kendall a scoop. Thanks to Zero, news of Terrence's injury goes public in "Sudden Death". Jude goes to Oscar to tell him that Sloane and Raquel are investigating him, even though the women may reveal Jude's crime. Oscar, however, throws his discovery of Jude's homosexuality in his face, so Jude stays silent. Jude learns that Zero knows about the cocaine, but did not use the information against Derek because it would also hurt Jude. Zero tells Jude about his rough childhood in foster care. In the season two finale "Winner Takes All", Jude is Lionel's "man of honor" at her impromptu wedding to Oscar, but is annoyed when Zero flirts with a woman. Jude becomes frustrated by the secret nature of his relationship with Zero, and gives Zero an ultimatum that he wants it to go to the next level. He recognizes that Zero is not concerned with being labeled as gay or bisexual, but is afraid to expose his true self to the world. Zero is unwilling to comply, but tells Jude that his real name is Gideon. Jude tells Gideon to call him when he is ready to go on a date in public.

=== Season 3 (2016) ===
In "Power Play", Zero's new bad boy image has attracted endorsements, and he wants Jude back as his agent. Jude, however, accepts Lionel's offer to be executive vice president of the Devils. Noticing that Derek's new agent, Lucas, is interested in Jude, Lionel tasks Jude to use it to their advantage in "Blocked". Lucas asks Jude out, but Zero sends Lucas—who is also his agent—off on an errand. Zero makes a play for captain of the team, and Pete gives it to him. Jude inadvertently sabotages his date with Lucas by making it clear that he is still in love with someone else. Zero discovers that Terrence and Jelena are the secret investors attempting to buy the Devils. In "Fake Out", Zero blackmails Terrence and Jelena into agreeing to trade Derek if they manage to buy the team. Summoned to jail to visit Oscar, Jude refuses to give any aid until Oscar fully accepts him as his son. Jude and Zero give in to their desires and have sex in a closet at Terrence and Jelena's engagement party, but Jude is furious that Zero still wants to hide their relationship. Zero tells Jude about Terrence and Jelena's plan in "Good D", admitting he made the underhanded deal for Jude. Later, Zero says "I love you" to Jude, who says it back, but leaves when Zero is still not ready to take their relationship to the next level. Jude has another date with Lucas, and they sleep together. Not realizing that Zero is the man Jude loves, Lucas tells Zero that he is not interested in pursuing anything with "needy" Jude. On the court, Zero tells Jude that Lucas is not coming to meet him, because Zero told him not to. Zero kisses a surprised Jude in front of the press and millions of viewers, effectively coming out. In "Lockout", Jude and Zero's romance is big news. Zero tells Jude that every move he has ever made has been planned in advance—but kissing Jude was not. Zero is uncomfortable with the new attention to his personal life and regrets the kiss, but is soon bolstered by overshadowing Derek in the press. Zero warms to his situation as more endorsements and a book deal come his way in "Carrying". The book falls apart when Zero refuses to talk about his past. Oscar makes a heartfelt plea for Jude's help, but fails Jude's test of his trustworthiness. Zero agrees to open up about his childhood to Jude. In "Killer Crossover", Zero and Jude visit the house where Zero grew up in foster care, which is about to be demolished. Zero opens up, and Jude encourages him to trash the place with a sledgehammer to get some closure. Zero helps Jude win the support of a powerful Devils board member in "Upset", and Zero takes Jude up on his offer to help find his sister Laura. Jude's private detective finds Laura in "Loss". In the season three finale "Possession", Oscar keeps Jude on the payroll, giving him a limited time to prove his loyalty. Zero decides not to contact his sister, who is doing well, to protect her from any blowback from his life. He tells Jude that he bought his childhood home for them to renovate and live in together. Jelena seizes control of the team, and informs Zero that she is trading him. Jude is unwilling to leave Lionel at Oscar's mercy, putting Jude and Zero's future together in question.

In the 2016 special "Til Death Do Us Part", Jelena has been shot, and both Jude and Zero are suspects. With Jelena temporarily out of commission, Zero's position on the team seems secure. When Jelena recovers, she tells Jude that she is keeping him as EVP, and Zero that she is going to make him miserable. Zero suspects that Jude shot Jelena to protect him—which he did not—but Jude is touched by Zero's willingness to lie for him. When Ahsha Hayes throws her wedding bouquet, it bounces off Zero's shoulder and into Jude's hands. Jelena names Zero team captain and restores Jude as EVP, telling them they are the real "King and King of LA".

=== Season 4 (2018) ===
In "Slay", Zero has left the Devils, and Jude laments that Zero rejected his marriage proposal. Jude is still reeling from their breakup, but has developed a better relationship with Jelena as they both worked to keep the team afloat. Lionel encourages Jude to go out and get over Zero. Jude meets another guy, Noah, during an attempted convenience store robbery. Jude brings an injured Noah home, and they have sex. Later, Jude and Noah realize that they will be working together, as Noah is a new sideline reporter assigned to the Devils. Jude tries to keep his distance from Noah at work in "Beast Mode", but the men end up having sex in Noah's press office. Jelena sells the team to Jude. In "Bad Blood", Jude gets jealous when Devil Girl Jamie Lawson sets Noah up with a closeted movie star. Noah asks Jude about Zero in "Number's Up", and Jude breaks things off. In "End Game", Commissioner Matthews orders Jude to fire a player, but he refuses. Jude admits to Noah that he is scared of what happened with Zero happening again, but wants to try with Noah. In "Hot Streak", Noah gets a lucrative job offer in New York, but turns it down for Jude. Noah hears in "Foul" that Jude used to provide Derek with cocaine. Before Noah confronts Jude or finds proof, Jude tells him the truth about his past with Derek, and Matthews' ultimatum. Noah breaks things off, saying that he cannot love Jude. In "Final Seconds", Lionel urges Noah to reunite with Jude. He tells Jude about Eve Vincent's connection to the gossip reporter Pierce, who helps Jude and Lionel thwart Eve's plan to destroy the Devils. When the team wins the championship, Jude and Noah kiss on the court. However, Jamie leaks Noah's recording of German's confession to the press, igniting a scandal intended to destroy the Devils.

=== After season four ===
After the cancellation of the series, creator James LaRosa revealed that Zero eventually returns and marries Jude, and the two have a daughter.

== Reception and impact ==
The pairing of Jude and Zero immediately attracted a following in the LGBT community, with Antonello noting that "the support from the audience has been incredible." In 2016, NewNowNext called the characters "TV's hottest gay couple", and said that "their passion and heat rivaled anything TV has ever given us with same-sex relationships." The Advocate wrote that the Jude and Zero storyline "has been breaking new ground on television". Farid ul-Haq of The Geekiary praised the reveal of Jude and Zero's gay relationship, writing that while most shows seem to announce a gay character's sexuality immediately, Hit the Floor instead surprised viewers with the two men kissing. He noted, "Their sexuality wasn't talked about until episode nine of season two. It was a nice surprise for viewers who thought the two men were straight from the beginning." Senn said that the audience reaction to the storyline has been "98% positive and amazing. You know you are doing your job when someone loves your character and someone hates your character. At least they have feelings. With all the love, there are the few I get hate mail [from]–guys or girls. Girls [who are] devastated and guys who are probably homophobic." Antonello said, "A lot of people, with the gay characters, they're pleased because the show takes place in such a testosterone-driven setting, with beautiful women. To bring these two characters in shocked everyone in a great way. We got great feedback." LaRosa said:

The response has been amazing ... and it started with Brent and Adam's response because they didn't know what they were getting into when they joined the show. Now there are people who tweet me all the time, "I think they're adorable, and I want them to have babies." I get tweets from women who are saying, "I never thought seeing two guys together would turn me on this much", or "That's the hottest sex scene I've ever seen, and it was with two guys!"

Attitude noted that the Jude and Zero romance "has been making a lot of waves in America", and that their romantic scenes "fall just the right side of naughty". LaRosa said that the characters' first sex scene "melted the Internet." Zero's coming out by kissing Jude on the court received critical praise, with Gay News noting that the character "came out in a suitably amazing fashion".

Fans and the press sometimes refer to Jude and Zero as a couple by the portmanteau "Zude".
