= Mit Herz und Handschellen =

- Country of origin: Germany

Mit Herz und Handschellen is a German television series.

== See also ==
- List of German television series
