= Hit the Floor (TV series) =

American drama television series

- Genre: Sports drama
- Created by: James LaRosa
- Starring: Kimberly Elise; Charlotte Ross; Taylour Paige; Logan Browning; Katherine Bailess; Valery Ortiz; McKinley Freeman; Jonathan McDaniel; Robert Christopher Riley; Don Stark; Dean Cain; Adam Senn; Brent Antonello; Jodi Lyn O'Keefe; Kyndall; Tiffany Hines; Kristian Kordula; Cort King; Teyana Taylor
- Country of origin: United States
- Original language: English
- No. of seasons: 4
- No. of episodes: 41 (list of episodes)

Production
- Executive producers: Bryan Johnson; James LaRosa; Jill Holmes; Maggie Malina; Susan Levison
- Running time: 42–45 minutes
- Production companies: 26 Productions; The Film Syndicate; In Cahoots Media

Original release
- Network: VH1 (2013–2016); BET (2018)
- Release: May 27, 2013 – August 28, 2018

Hit the Floor, originally titled Bounce, is an American sports drama television series that debuted on VH1 on May 27, 2013. Created by James LaRosa, the series chronicles the off-the-court drama surrounding the Los Angeles Devil Girls, the cheerleaders for the Los Angeles Devils, a fictional professional basketball team. On April 27, 2017, the series was renewed for an eight-episode fourth season that premiered on BET on July 10, 2018. The network canceled the series on December 7, 2018.

== Plot ==
Ahsha Hayes (Taylour Paige) becomes the newest member of the Devil Girls, the cheerleaders for the professional basketball team, the Los Angeles Devils, and immediately makes an enemy of Devil Girl captain Jelena Howard (Logan Browning). Knowing that her mother Sloane (Kimberly Elise) used to be a Devil Girl herself, Ahsha is shocked to discover that former player-turned-coach of the Devils, Pete Davenport (Dean Cain), is her biological father. Ahsha is also tempted by bad boy player Derek Roman (McKinley Freeman), even though she is already involved with German Vega (Jonathan McDaniel).

Season two is overshadowed by the murder of Olivia Vincent (Charlotte Ross), who was blackmailing several people associated with the Devils. Meanwhile, Ahsha and Derek try to keep their relationship a secret, Pete's estranged wife Lionel (Jodi Lyn O'Keefe) becomes a regular presence at the arena, and a devious new forward named Zero (Adam Senn) arrives with a plan to supplant star players Terrence Wall (Robert Christopher Riley) and Derek. Zero seduces—and eventually gets burned by—Jelena, before he becomes sexually involved with his male agent, Jude Kinkade (Brent Antonello).

In season three, a reunited Jelena and Terrence secretly plot to take over the Devils and oust Lionel, and Zero's unwillingness to go public becomes an obstacle to his fledgling relationship with Jude. From jail, Devils owner Oscar Kinkade (Don Stark) seeks vengeance against Sloane, who has rekindled her romance with Pete.

Season four finds Ahsha and Zero gone from the Devils and Los Angeles, leaving Derek and Jude to navigate new relationships. A vengeful Eve Vincent (Tiffany Hines), Olivia's daughter with Chase Vincent (Rick Fox), arrives with a plan to destroy the Devils. New Devil Girls London Scott (Teyana Taylor) and Jamie Lawson (Kyndall) clash, and Derek is frustrated with new rookie player Pax Lowe (Cort King).

After the cancellation of the series, creator James LaRosa announced the resolutions of several storylines.

== Episodes ==
Season	Episodes	Originally released		
Season	Episodes	First released	Last released	Network
1	10	May 27, 2013	July 29, 2013	VH1
2	12	May 26, 2014	August 11, 2014	VH1
3	10	January 18, 2016	March 28, 2016	VH1
Special		September 5, 2016		VH1
4	8	July 10, 2018	August 28, 2018	BET

== Cast and characters ==
Actor	Character	Seasons			
Actor	Character	1	2	3	4
Kimberly Elise	Sloane Hayes	Main	Main	Main	
Charlotte Ross	Olivia Vincent	Main			
Taylour Paige	Ahsha Hayes	Main	Main	Main	
Logan Browning	Jelena Howard	Main (Note: In season 4, Logan is credited as a series regular until episode 2.)	Main	Main	Main
Katherine Bailess	Kyle Hart	Main	Main	Main	Main
Valery Ortiz	Raquel Saldana	Main	Main	Main	
McKinley Freeman	Derek Roman	Main	Main	Main	Main
Jonathan McDaniel	German Vega	Main	Main	Main	Main
Robert Christopher Riley	Terrence Wall	Main	Main	Main	
Don Stark	Oscar Kinkade	Main	Main	Main	Guest
Dean Cain	Pete Davenport	Main (Note: In season 4, Dean is credited as a series regular until episode 1.)	Main	Main	Main
Adam Senn	"Zero"		Main	Main	
Brent Antonello	Jude Kinkade		Main	Main	Main
Jodi Lyn O'Keefe	Lionel Davenport		Main	Main	Main
Kyndall	Jamie Lawson				Main
Tiffany Hines	Eve Vincent				Main
Kristian Kordula	Noah				Main
Cort King	Pax Lowe				Main
Teyana Taylor	London Scott				Main
Durrell "Tank" Babbs	Warren Matthews				Main

=== Main ===
- Kimberly Elise as Sloane Hayes (seasons 1–3), Ahsha's mother, who was one of the original Devil Girls herself. She later becomes the director of the Devil Girls.
- Charlotte Ross as Olivia Vincent (season 1), the former director of the Devil Girls and like Sloane, an original Devil Girl. She is murdered at the beginning of the second season.
- Taylour Paige as Ahsha Hayes (seasons 1–3), the breakout star of the Los Angeles Devil Girls who immediately becomes a threat to Jelena. Using her dancing abilities to climb her way to the top, Ahsha is in a relationship with her college sweetheart German Vega, but finds herself attracted to the Devils' point guard Derek Roman.
- Logan Browning as Jelena Howard, the captain of the Devil Girls—and the mean girl of the team—who is intent on making new girl Ahsha suffer. Despite her many schemes, she has a soft side for her boyfriend Terrence Wall, the captain of the Devils.
- Katherine Bailess as Kyle Hart, a clever stripper-turned-cheerleader.
- Valery Ortiz as Raquel Saldana (seasons 1–3), a former cheerleader-turned manager of the Devils' Playground, who is best friends with Ahsha and Jelena. Kyle offers to feign a lesbian marriage with Raquel to hide her undocumented status. After being diagnosed with a terminal illness, Raquel dies in season three.
- McKinley Freeman as Derek Roman, the Devils' MVP player later Ahsha's husband and London's new love interest.
- Jonathan McDaniel as German Vega, the assistant coach of the Devils, Ahsha's ex-boyfriend, and later Eve's love interest.
- Robert Christopher Riley as Terrence Wall (seasons 1–3), the captain of the Devils and Jelena's boyfriend.
- Don Stark as Oscar Kinkade (seasons 1–3; guest season 4), the unscrupulous owner of the Devils.
- Dean Cain as Pete Davenport, a former player-turned-coach of the Los Angeles Devils who has a past with Sloane when he was a player and she was a Devil Girl. He is later revealed to be Ahsha's father. His estranged wife Lionel later reappears, and he ventures into a relationship with Sloane. This character is killed in a drunk driving incident in first episode of season four.
- Adam Senn as "Zero" (seasons 2–3), a devious forward from Ohio with a number of secrets.
- Brent Antonello as Jude Kinkade (seasons 2–4), a junior agent, and Oscar's estranged gay son, who eventually becomes vice president of the Devils, and then the team's owner.
- Jodi Lyn O'Keefe as Lionel Davenport (seasons 2–4), an A-list actress and Pete's ex-wife, who later marries Oscar.
- Kyndall as Jamie Lawson (season 4), a new Devil Girl.
- Tiffany Hines as Eve Vincent (season 4), Chase's and Olivia's daughter.
- Kristian Kordula as Noah (season 4), a sideline reporter for Lionel's Inside Sports Network and love interest for Jude.
- Cort King as Pax Lowe (season 4), a rookie player.
- Teyana Taylor as London Scott (season 4), a choreographer coming out of a highly publicized affair.
- Durrell "Tank" Babbs as Warren Matthews (season 4), the new commissioner of the league.

=== Recurring ===
- Bernard Curry as Jesse Reade (season 1), a sports agent who is Raquel's ex and the father of her son Miguel.
- Melissa Molinaro as Lexi (seasons 1–3), a Devil Girl who is taken off the team when Kyle joins it, and returns a few times to cause Kyle trouble.
- Stephen Colletti as Teddy Reynolds (seasons 1–3), a wealthy admirer of Kyle.
- Rick Fox as Chase Vincent (seasons 1–3), the EVP of the Devils organization. He is Olivia's husband and Eve's father.
- Johanna Braddy as Mia Sertner (season 1), a Devil Girl who dies under suspicious circumstances.
- Jason George as Michael (seasons 1–2), a league investigator who works against Oscar with Sloane.
- Jared Ward as Beau Ashby (seasons 2–4), a con artist who becomes romantically involved with Kyle.
- Lynn Whitfield as Vanessa Howard (seasons 2–3), Jelena's mother.
- Jonathan Bennett as Lucas (season 3), Derek and Zero's new agent, who briefly dates Jude.
- William Baldwin as Jackson Everett (season 3), a wealthy venture capitalist who has a romantic history with Lionel.
- James LaRosa as Pierce (seasons 3–4), a gossip reporter.
- Terrence J as Pastor Curtis (season 4), London's married ex-lover.
- Shireen Crutchfield as Leah Matthews (season 4), Warren's wife who has been sleeping with Pax.

=== Guest ===
- Bernie Kopell as Mel O'Grane, the Devils' former announcer (season 1)
- Tichina Arnold as Mary Roman, Derek's mother (season 2)
- Jonathan Frakes as Hank (season 2)
- Joe Lando as Detective Ray Harris (season 2)
- Terrell Tilford as Detective Curtis (season 3)
- Thomas Calabro as Marcus Douglas, a powerful Devils board member (season 3)
- Michael Beach as James Howard (season 3), Jelena's estranged father
- Erika Jayne as Beverly (season 4), a New York media mogul

== Production ==
Hit the Floor was announced by VH1 in April 2012. The series was created and executive produced by LaRosa, alongside Bryan Johnson and Maggie Malina. The pilot was written by James LaRosa and directed by Sanaa Hamri. Signed on to the pilot was Taylour Paige as Ahsha, the lead; Dean Cain as Pete, the coach of the basketball team; Kimberly Elise as Sloane, Ahsha's mother; Valery Ortiz as Raquel, and Katherine Bailess as Kyle. Following the announcement of the pilot, Charlotte Ross signed on to play Olivia, a former dancer-turned-basketball wife who oversees the squad. The pilot was ordered to series in July 2012, with Logan Browning, Jonathan McDaniel and McKinley Freeman signing on to the main cast. Don Stark, who plays Oscar Kinkade, the owner of the basketball team, and Robert Christopher Riley, who plays star player Terrence, were upgraded to series regulars after being billed as guest stars in the pilot. In April 2013, Starz Distribution finalized an international television distribution agreement to represent Hit the Floor outside of the United States. The series premiered on May 27, 2013, and the first season was the No. 1 new cable scripted series of mid-2013 among the adults 18–49 viewership demo.

VH1 announced the renewal for a second season on July 15, 2013. Season two production began on January 31, 2014, and premiered on May 26, 2014. The season featured a whodunit story involving Olivia's murder, and LaRosa was inspired by the 1980s "Who shot J.R.?" storyline on Dallas to shoot multiple resolutions so that even the cast would not know the identity of the killer until the episode aired. Teasing the reveal in the season two finale, LaRosa said, "It's definitely someone you've come to know. It's a name at the top of the credits and I can tell you that you will be shocked ... the reveal gives me chills every single time".

On July 29, 2014, VH1 announced the third season renewal of Hit the Floor. The 10-episode new season premiered on January 18, 2016 and ended on March 28, 2016. In April 2016, VH1 greenlit an hour-long summer special to resolve the cliffhangers raised in the third season finale. The special aired on September 5, 2016.

On April 27, 2017, it was announced that the series would move to BET for its future seasons. In October 2017, BET announced that Cain, Elise, Freeman, Bailess, O'Keefe, and Antonello would be returning to the series, and series creator James LaRosa confirmed that Paige and Senn would not be returning for season four. Teyana Taylor was cast in an undisclosed role in October, and four new regular cast members were announced in November 2017: Tiffany Hines as "mystery woman" Eve, Cort King as rookie player Pax, Kyndall as new dancer Jamie, and Kristian Kordula as reporter Noah. Production began in November 2017, and the series' eight-episode fourth season premiered on July 10, 2018.

LaRosa said in August 2018 that he had already planned out a potential fifth season. However, BET canceled the series on December 7, 2018.
