= Adam Senn =

France-born American actor, model, and restaurateur

Edward Adam Senn
- Born: Edward Adam Senn; April 10, 1984 (age 42); Paris, France
- Partner: Adriana Čerňanová
- Children: 1
- Modeling information
- Height: 1.85 m (6 ft 1 in)
- Hair color: Blonde
- Eye color: Blue
- Agency: IMG Models

Edward Adam Senn (born April 10, 1984) is an American model, actor, and restaurateur. He is known for playing Zero, a professional basketball player, on VH1's Hit the Floor from 2014 to 2016.

== Early life ==
Senn was born in Paris, France, and grew up in Sugar Land, Texas, a suburb of Houston. He studied theater as a child and throughout high school. After high school Senn moved to New York City, where he attended Atlantic Theater, while working for fashion brands like Tom Ford and Gucci.

== Career ==
Since 2002, Senn has modeled consistently for Gucci, Tom Ford, Versace, Dsquared, Tommy Hillfiger, Nautica. Dolce & Gabbana in lookbooks, campaign ads, and fashion shows. He also became the face for their new One Sport fragrance campaign. Other fashion campaigns and editorials for 2012 included Express, photographed by Greg Kadel, Mavi Jeans campaign, snapped by Mariano Vivanco, and Blanco Suitebalanco. He covered the S/S 2012 Vogue Hombre and shot an editorial for Panorama magazines. According to Models.com, Senn was ranked #16 of "The Money Guys" for 2012.

Senn had a lead role in the 2011 movie Video Girl, costarring Meagan Good.

Senn portrayed bisexual basketball player Zero in VH1's Hit the Floor for two seasons, from 2014 to 2016. In 2023, he starred as Coby Mason in A Cowboy Christmas Romance, which featured the first sex scene to be included in a Lifetime holiday movie.

Senn co-owns a restaurant named Bocca di Bacco in New York City.

== Personal life ==
Senn became engaged to Adriana Čerňanová in July 2022. The couple welcomed a son in July 2025.

== Filmography ==
Year	Title	Role	Notes
2008–2009	The City	Himself	Main: 13 episodes (season 1)
2011	Law & Order: Special Victims Unit	Hank Roberts	Episode: "Pop"
2011	Magic City Memoirs	Charles	
2011	Video Girl	Shark	
2011	Losing Sam	Justin	Short (also produced)
2013	Head Spinner	Brian	Short (also produced)
2014–2016	Hit the Floor	Zero	Main (seasons 2–3)
2014	While We're Young	Bartender	
2015	Charlie, Trevor and a Girl Savannah	Marty	Also Associate Producer
2015	Supermodel	William Fitch	
2015	VH1 Big in 2015 with Entertainment Weekly	Himself	Television Special
2016	Married by Christmas	Ethan	
2017	Illicit	Todd	
2017	Soul Sessions	Nick	
2017	A Winter Wedding	Leif Pierce	
2023	A Cowboy Christmas Romance	Coby Mason	
