= List of Hit the Floor episodes =

Hit the Floor is an American drama television series created by James LaRosa. The series chronicles the off-the-court drama surrounding the Los Angeles Devils, a fictional professional basketball team. Hit the Floor debuted on VH1 on May 27, 2013. After three seasons on VH1, Hit the Floor moved to BET for season four. The series was canceled on December 7, 2018. During the course of the series, 41 episodes of Hit the Floor aired, including one special over four seasons.

== Series overview ==
Season	Episodes	Originally released		
Season	Episodes	First released	Last released	Network
1	10	May 27, 2013	July 29, 2013	VH1
2	12	May 26, 2014	August 11, 2014	VH1
3	10	January 18, 2016	March 28, 2016	VH1
Special		September 5, 2016		VH1
4	8	July 10, 2018	August 28, 2018	BET

== Episodes ==
=== Season 1 (2013) ===
No. overall	No. in season	Title	Directed by	Written by	Original release date	US viewers (millions)
1	1	"Pilot"	Sanaa Hamri	James LaRosa	May 27, 2013	1.54
Ahsha Hayes tries out for the Los Angeles Devil Girls, much to the chagrin of her mother Sloane—one of the original Devil Girls, who distanced herself from the team to have her daughter. Ahsha immediately attracts the attention of player Derek Roman, and the ire of Devil Girls captain Jelena Howard, who sees the talented Ahsha as a threat. After Ahsha makes the team, Sloane tells former player-turned-coach Pete Davenport that he is Ahsha's biological father.
2	2	"Game On"	Tamra Davis	James LaRosa	June 3, 2013	1.67
Ahsha continues to rebuff Derek's advances. Olivia Vincent helps get recently-replaced Devil Girl Raquel Saldana a job at the Devils Playground private club, and puts an end to Jelena's influence over her decisions. Team captain Terrence Wall tells Derek to put aside his partying and womanizing, and focus on his game. Devil Girl Kyle Hart wins over a Devils VIP. Jelena tells Ahsha that Pete is her father.
3	3	"Out of Bounds"	Tamra Davis	Ayanna A. Floyd	June 10, 2013	1.98
Upset over her mother's secret, Ahsha misses the Devil Girls dance at the opening game, and narrowly avoids being fired by Olivia. Ahsha confronts Sloane, and moves in with her boyfriend German Vega. Pete encourages Raquel to fight her ex. Devils owner Oscar Kinkade and Olivia's husband Chase Vincent conspire to find a missing Devil Girl named Mia. Terrence and Derek clash again over Derek's behavior.
4	4	"Rebound"	Daisy von Scherler Mayer	Jason Ganzel	June 17, 2013	2.16
Pete and Sloane discuss the past, starting with when she caught him in bed with her best friend—Olivia. Jelena sets up Ahsha to fail at a photo shoot, but Kyle and Derek help her succeed. Olivia tries to track Mia down and rekindle her friendship with Sloane. Jelena recognizes a connection between Derek and Ahsha.
5	5	"Keep Away"	Daisy von Scherler Mayer	Tonya Kong	June 24, 2013	2.22
Pete tries to connect with Ahsha. Jelena uses Derek to make German insecure in his relationship with Ahsha. Sloane tells Ahsha about her sordid past, admitting that getting pregnant and leaving Pete saved her life. Terrence reveals that he has opened a restaurant named Jelena's.
6	6	"Lights Out"	Melanie Mayron	James LaRosa	July 1, 2013	2.12
German and Ahsha have a fight. A blackout at the arena traps Derek and Ahsha in an elevator together; they argue, and then kiss. Mia comes to Jelena for help finding her missing uniform. Pete and Raquel kiss, but he is not ready to become romantically involved. He and Sloane have sex. Oscar's plans to build a new arena in Hollywood are revived, thanks to his sabotaging the emergency generator.
7	7	"Moving Screens"	Melanie Mayron	Ayanna A. Floyd	July 8, 2013	2.23
Pete and Sloane continue their affair. Ahsha checks in on Derek, who is reeling about Terrence's desire to be traded to another team because of Derek's lack of commitment. Mia searches the arena for her old costume, which she believes will protect her from Oscar. After leaking her own sex tape, Kyle avoids being fired by blackmailing members of the discretionary board. Ahsha informs a stunned Jelena about Terrence's intentions. German punches Derek.
8	8	"Fast Break"	Daisy von Scherler Mayer	Jason Ganzel	July 15, 2013	2.23
Jelena is mad at Terrence for not telling her about the trade. When Jelena takes her frustrations out on the Devil Girls in practice, Olivia takes Jelena off choreography duty. Mia comes to Sloane's house seeking Ahsha. German and Ahsha fight over their disintegrating relationship. Sick of Jelena's taunts, Ahsha decides to compete against her for the All-Star game.
9	9	"Benched"	Daisy von Scherler Mayer	James LaRosa	July 22, 2013	2.50
Terrence's trade falls apart when he tests positive for oxymethalone, a performance-enhancing drug. Mia finds her old costume—and the microphone it contains—and hands it over to Oscar. Ahsha walks in on Pete and Sloane in bed, and Sloane ends the affair. Jelena plots with Raquel to get rid of Jesse for good. At Olivia's suggestion, Ahsha goes public with the fact that Pete is her father to draw attention that will hopefully help her win All-Star. German learns that Ahsha and Derek kissed, and breaks up with Ahsha. Planning to propose to Jelena, Terrence discovers oxymethalone in her locker. Oscar rewards Jelena for helping him keep Derek in LA. A Devil Girl is found dead.
10	10	"Turnover"	Millicent Shelton	James LaRosa	July 29, 2013	2.62
Olivia announces Mia's death. Ahsha makes All-Star over Jelena. When Chase accuses Oscar of killing Mia, Oscar reminds Chase that he raped Mia. Pete asks Raquel out. After seeing German with another woman, Ahsha takes Derek up on his offer to celebrate her win. Derek and Ahsha have sex. As part of his deal with Jelena, Oscar replaces Olivia with Sloane as director of the Devil Girls. Terrence breaks up with Jelena for drugging him. Ahsha reaches out to Pete. Secretly working with the league, Sloane intends to investigate Oscar from inside the Devils organization.

=== Season 2 (2014) ===
No. overall	No. in season	Title	Directed by	Written by	Original release date	US viewers (millions)
11	1	"Game Changer"	Tamra Davis	James LaRosa	May 26, 2014	2.36
Oscar signs Zero, a cocky forward from a rival Ohio team, whose agent is Oscar's estranged son, Jude. Sloane starts as the director of the Devil Girls, and clashes with Jelena. Pete's soon-to-be ex-wife, famous actress Lionel, reappears. Derek asks Ahsha to move in; she resists at first, but finally agrees. Zero befriends Derek and Terrence, but also pursues a newly-single Jelena, who is not interested. Pete offers German an assistant coach position. Jelena agrees to go out with Zero to make Terrence jealous. Jude wants Lionel to attend every game, but she will only agree if Pete is no longer dating Raquel. At the groundbreaking ceremony for the new Devils arena, Oscar uncovers Olivia's body.
12	2	"Passing"	Tamra Davis	Holly Henderson & Don Whitehead	June 2, 2014	2.15
Olivia's murder creates a public relations nightmare for Oscar, which Sloane intends to exploit. Derek and Ahsha struggle to hide their relationship. Beau coerces Kyle into fleecing Devils VIPs in exchange for her divorce papers. Jude manages to drive a wedge between Pete and Raquel. Jelena rebuffs Zero's advances, but then has sex with him at Olivia's church service. Chase is arrested for murder at the burial.
13	3	"Behind the Back"	Jonathan Frakes	Jason Ganzel	June 9, 2014	2.15
Chase tells Sloane that he did not kill Olivia—but he did move the body. He believes Oscar did it to silence Olivia, and framed him. Pete and Raquel reconcile, but Jude and Lionel sour their plans for a weekend getaway. Jelena arranges for pictures to be taken of Derek and Ahsha together. Zero tells Jelena that Terrence is selling the restaurant he named after her. Jude encourages Zero to drive a wedge between Terrence and Derek. Lionel admits to Pete that she wants him back. Jelena has a red blackmail envelope from Olivia.
14	4	"Full-Court Press"	Jonathan Frakes	Sarah E. Fahey	June 16, 2014	2.39
With the pictures of Derek and Ahsha about to be made public, Lionel goes to Pete with a plan to publicize Derek and Ahsha's relationship before it can be twisted into a scandal. Zero goes to German with plays that he says would guarantee the team more wins, but would feature more of Zero and less of Derek. Michael urges Sloane to give up her investigation into Oscar's wrongdoings. Jude continues trying to keep Pete and Raquel apart. Beau settles Kyle's debt and gives her the divorce papers, and they have sex. Jelena learns that Olivia left her 10% share of the Devil Girls to Jelena's mother, Vanessa. Raquel catches Sloane trying to break into Oscar's office. Jude, Kyle, and Derek have red envelopes from Olivia.
15	5	"Shattered Glass"	Emile Levisetti	James LaRosa	June 23, 2014	2.45
Raquel agrees to help Sloane with her investigation, and later breaks things off with Pete. Jelena makes Vanessa an offer for the Devil Girls shares. Jake confronts Kyle with the evidence Olivia had on her. Jude discovers that Olivia was also blackmailing Derek; she knew that he tested positive for cocaine, and that Jude provided it for him. Jelena tells her mother how disgusted she is that Vanessa let herself be physically abused by Jelena's father years before. Vanessa refuses to sell her shares in order to maintain a connection with Jelena. Pete tells Derek about German's new plays. Raquel has one of Olivia's blackmail envelopes, as well as her own file from Oscar's office.
16	6	"Blow Out"	Emile Levisetti	Judalina Neira	June 30, 2014	2.38
Derek accuses German of purposely constructing new plays to exclude him, which puts Derek at odds with Terrence and Ahsha. Zero helps Jelena dig up dirt on Sloane, which includes his posing nude in exchange for an embarrassing photo of Sloane. Raquel convinces Jude not to submit her to a background check. Derek realizes that Zero brought the new plays to German. Pete and Sloane kiss. Derek explodes at Zero and Terrence at his roast, and the picture of Sloane is displayed to everyone. Derek gets pulled over, and the police see the cocaine he tossed into Ahsha's purse.
17	7	"Isolation"	Daisy von Scherler Mayer	Holly Henderson & Don Whitehead	July 7, 2014	2.45
Derek gets Ahsha off with a warning, but she is still upset. Jude confronts Zero about his fight with Derek. Lionel calls off her agreement with Jude, and signs the divorce papers. Terrence and Jelena have an intimate moment during a visit from Terence's old friend Vance, who is suffering from chronic traumatic encephalopathy. Zero gives Jelena an ultimatum to choose him or Terrence. Pete and Lionel have sex. Raquel tells Sloane what Olivia had on her: she is undocumented. Jude discovers that Sloane and Raquel want to take Oscar down.
18	8	"Playing Dirty"	Daisy von Scherler Mayer	Jason Ganzel	July 14, 2014	2.14
Jude demands that Sloane and Raquel give him what they have on Oscar, or he will tell his father that they are plotting against him. Zero threatens to purposely sabotage the Devils' chance at a championship ring if Jelena does not choose him over Terrence. Ahsha confronts Pete about his drinking. Three rich suitors compete for Kyle. Zero makes Jude his only agent, and buys him a sportscar. In retaliation for Zero's threats, Jelena destroys his religious image by leaking information about his dalliances with prostitutes to the press. Raquel and Sloane turn the tables on Jude when they find out that he was being blackmailed by Olivia. Jude kisses Zero.
19	9	"Unguarded"	Millicent Shelton	James LaRosa	July 21, 2014	2.41
Jelena and Terrence reunite. Raquel and Sloane find a link between Oscar and the medical examiner who performed Mia's autopsy. Pete expresses to Sloane his remorse for abandoning her before Ahsha was born. Jelena confronts Terrence over his drug use, and he admits that he needs surgery on his leg. Raquel finds Kyle's red envelope, and tells her that Oscar was somehow involved in Mia's death. A jealous Zero kisses Jude, and they have sex.
20	10	"Steal"	Millicent Shelton	Sarah E. Fahey & Judalina Neira	July 28, 2014	1.95
Pete and Sloane rekindle their romance, and Lionel is crushed when her divorce from Pete is finalized. Jude and Zero continue their sexual relationship, which Zero prefers to call "having fun". Jelena is not happy when the Devil Girls vote for Ahsha to choreograph their next performance. Terrence tells Derek that he needs surgery. Chase gets out of jail on a technicality, and gives Sloane a lead in her investigation of Oscar. Lionel discovers that she is pregnant. With the investigation into Olivia's murder reopening, Jude and Derek agree to be each other's alibis. Zero gives Kendall a scoop. Jelena finds Sloane's evidence against Oscar.
21	11	"Sudden Death"	James LaRosa	Holly Henderson & Don Whitehead	August 4, 2014	1.86
Chase is officially cleared of Olivia's murder. Thanks to Zero, news of Terrence's injury goes public. Derek confronts Jude for conspiring with Zero against him and Terrence. Jude goes to Oscar to tell him about Sloane and Raquel investigating him even though the women may reveal Jude's crime. Oscar, however, throws his discovery of Jude's homosexuality in his face, so Jude stays silent. German and Ahsha have sex. Lionel uses Sloane's evidence of Oscar's crimes to coerce him. Oscar points the police toward several suspects in Olivia's murder—including Jude.
22	12	"Winner Takes All"	James LaRosa	James LaRosa	August 11, 2014	2.37
Oscar and Lionel announce that they are getting married. Suspecting that Jelena gave the evidence to Lionel, Sloane finds the recording device in Lionel's things, and gives it to the police. Terrence breaks his leg on the court. Derek's point wins the Devils the championship, to Zero's annoyance. Frustrated by Zero's unwillingness to stop hiding their relationship, Jude ends it. Oscar is arrested for Mia's murder, and knows that the evidence came from Sloane. Kyle offers to marry Raquel to secure her citizenship. Lionel tells Sloane that she manipulated her into incriminating Oscar so Lionel could get rid of him and take over the team. Jelena's price for helping Lionel is Ahsha being fired from the Devil Girls. German is revealed to be the person who killed Olivia, after intercepting one of her red envelopes meant for Ahsha.

=== Season 3 (2016) ===
No. overall	No. in season	Title	Directed by	Written by	Original release date	US viewers (millions)
23	1	"Power Play"	Jonathan Frakes	James LaRosa	January 18, 2016	1.71
The Devil Girls are auditioning new dancers, and with Jelena's encouragement, Raquel gets back on the team. With Terrence's place on the team in jeopardy, Jelena realizes that she does not have as much control over Lionel as she thought. Zero's new bad boy image has attracted endorsements, and he wants Jude back as his agent. Jude, however, accepts Lionel's offer to be executive vice president of the Devils. Sloane convinces the league to force a sale of the Devils to oust Lionel. Terrence proposes to Jelena, and she accepts. They secretly make overtures to buy the Devils.
24	2	"Blocked"	Jonathan Frakes	Holly Henderson & Don Whitehead	January 25, 2016	1.55
Lionel is under pressure to avoid the forced sale by re-signing Derek, who is holding out for more money. Noticing that Derek's new agent, Lucas, is interested in Jude, Lionel tasks Jude to use it to their advantage. Ahsha gets a job offer to join another team—in Boston. Jelena goes to her mother to secure the 10% share of the Devil Girls, but Vanessa makes it contingent on her participation in Jelena's wedding planning. Zero makes a play for captain of the team, and Pete gives it to him. German is tormented by Olivia's murder. Derek agrees to sign if Lionel rehires Ahsha. Zero discovers that Terrence and Jelena are the secret investors attempting to buy the Devils.
25	3	"Fake Out"	Tamra Davis	Sarah E. Fahey	February 1, 2016	1.35
As part of Derek's deal, Lionel rehires Ahsha, and makes Derek team captain. Zero blackmails Terrence and Jelena into agreeing to trade Derek if they manage to buy the team. Raquel is diagnosed with a serious heart condition. On Oscar's order, Sloane's captor plans to kill her and make it look like suicide, but she escapes. Summoned to jail to visit Oscar, Jude refuses to give any aid until Oscar fully accepts him as his son. Beau returns with another scheme for Kyle. Jude and Zero give in to their desires and have sex in a closet at Terrence and Jelena's engagement party, but Jude is furious that Zero still wants to hide their relationship.
26	4	"Good D"	Tamra Davis	James LaRosa	February 8, 2016	1.17
Zero tells Jude about Terrence and Jelena's plan. Sloane learns how to fire a gun. Zero says "I love you" to Jude, who says it back, but leaves when Zero is still not ready to take their relationship to the next level. Jude has another date with Lucas, and they sleep together. Thrown together in Las Vegas, Derek and Ahsha have sex. Lionel uses Derek to outsmart Terrence and Jelena and stop the forced sale of the Devils. German is in a car accident. Zero kisses a surprised Jude in front of the press and millions of viewers, effectively coming out. German tells Ahsha that he killed Olivia.
27	5	"Lockout"	Bille Woodruff	Judalina Neira	February 22, 2016	1.42
Jude and Zero's romance is big news. Sloane goes into protective custody before the trial. Jelena plots to drive a wedge between Lionel and the owner of the arena. Ahsha struggles with German's secret, and cannot stay away from Derek. Terrence and Jelena buy the arena out from under Lionel. Sloane is manipulated into incriminating herself in Olivia's murder.
28	6	"Carrying"	Bille Woodruff	Holly Henderson, Don Whitehead & Kristen SaBerre	February 29, 2016	1.30
Thanks to a police officer on Oscar's payroll, Sloane is a suspect in Olivia's murder. Terrence and Jelena triple the rent for the arena. Zero warms to his situation as more endorsements and a book deal come his way. To Jelena's chagrin, a former employee of Terrence's restaurant is pregnant with his child. German confronts Derek about sleeping with Ahsha. Pete hides Sloane's unregistered gun from the police. Oscar fails Jude's test of his trustworthiness. The suicide note that Sloane's captor forced her to write surfaces, and she is arrested for murder.
29	7	"Killer Crossover"	Janice Cooke	James LaRosa	March 7, 2016	1.11
Ahsha agrees to help repair the rift between Derek and Terrance if Jelena makes her captain of the Devil Girls. Kyle and Beau's movie scam hits a snag when early footage starts getting buzz. Ahsha wants German to confess to the murder to exonerate Sloane, but he disappears. Sloane visits Oscar, who insinuates that Ahsha has a connection to the murder. Zero and Jude visit the house where Zero grew up in foster care, and Jude helps Zero face his past. Jelena proves that the baby is not Terrence's. Beau tells Kyle that he loves her, and she later realizes that she loves him too. Raquel collapses. Sloane guesses that German is the killer, and when he hears about her predicament, he confesses.
30	8	"Upset"	Janice Cooke	Sarah E. Fahey & Judalina Neira	March 14, 2016	0.92
Jelena confronts her father over his abuse of her mother. Lionel apologizes to Sloane for publicly condemning her, but Sloane is unforgiving. Raquel is told her heart condition is worse, and she likely has only weeks to live. Zero helps Jude win the support of a powerful Devils board member. Sloane helps Terrence and Jelena get another shot at buying the team. A desperate Lionel makes the murder charges against Oscar go away to get him out of jail to help her hold onto the team. Jelena learns she may not be able to conceive a child. German is sentenced to 20 years, but Chase stabs him on the way out of the courtroom.
31	9	"Loss"	James LaRosa	Holly Henderson & Don Whitehead	March 21, 2016	1.32
Oscar turns the tables on Lionel by relieving her of the evidence of racketeering she has against him. Raquel is dying. A recovering German wishes Chase killed him, and asks Derek to help him kill himself. Oscar pressures the league to reject Terrence and Jelena's offer. Jude's private detective finds Laura. The Devil Girls perform a special dance for Raquel before she dies. Oscar vows to kill Sloane.
32	10	"Possession"	James LaRosa	James LaRosa	March 28, 2016	1.21
Oscar keeps Jude on the payroll, giving him a limited time to prove his loyalty. Jelena tells Terrence about her infertility, but he does not immediately believe her. Derek proposes to Ahsha on the court in front of everyone. Jelena gives Oscar the arena in exchange for 10% of the Devils. Raquel leaves Kyle with a video confessing to Olivia's murder, and exonerating German. Jelena reveals to Oscar that she has been buying all of the board's minority shares, and with her new 10% she is now the majority owner of the team. Lionel plots to frame Oscar for her attempted murder, but she and Pete become trapped in a garage filling with carbon monoxide. Jelena breaks things off with Terrence, and informs Zero that she is trading him. After firing Sloane, Jelena is shot.

=== Special (2016) ===
No. overall	No. in season	Title	Directed by	Written by	Original release date	US viewers (millions)
33	1	"Til Death Do Us Part"	James LaRosa	James LaRosa	September 5, 2016	1.24
Lionel and Pete are rescued from the garage, and Pete tells the police that Oscar tried to kill Lionel. Jelena survives, and the police question the likely suspects in the shooting: Ahsha, Sloane, Jude, and Zero. Lionel negotiates with Oscar to recant her story in exchange for a divorce. Derek tells Jelena that he intends to leave the Devils for another team. At first she makes it impossible, but then relents so she can be rid of Ahsha. Jelena discovers that a repentant Sloane shot her, but decides to keep the secret. Derek and Ahsha get married. Jelena takes in Raquel's young son Miguel, makes Kyle captain of the Devil Girls, Zero captain of the Devils and keeps Jude as EVP for Business Operations.

=== Season 4 (2018) ===
No. overall	No. in season	Title	Directed by	Written by	Original release date	US viewers (millions)
34	1	"Slay"	James LaRosa	James LaRosa	July 10, 2018	0.48
Over a year after Jelena took control of the Devils, Lionel now owns Inside Sports network as part of her divorce settlement from Oscar. Derek has divorced Ahsha after she had an abortion without telling him in Miami. The news prompts Pete to start drinking again, and he is killed in a car crash. Jude is still reeling from his breakup with Zero. He meets Noah during an attempted convenience store robbery and they have sex. Jelena is annoyed when Kyle recruits London, who clashes with fellow new Devil Girl Jamie. Jelena re-signs Derek to the Devils. Jude and Noah realize that they will be working together. Eve vows revenge against everyone she blames for her mother Olivia's death.
35	2	"Beast Mode"	James LaRosa	James LaRosa	July 17, 2018	0.34
German returns from Boston to be the Devils' new head coach. Eve's first move is to interfere with Jelena's adoption of Miguel; her second is to have sex with Lionel. Derek has a party, and accidentally burns down his mansion. Jude tries to keep his distance from Noah at work, but the men end up having sex in Noah's press office. London's ex-lover Curtis professes his love, but is really trying to dissuade her from performing in public. Jelena sells the team to Jude, and skips town with Miguel.
36	3	"Bad Blood"	Bille Woodruff	Holly Henderson	July 24, 2018	0.37
Pax continues having sex with women for money, and Derek slams him for his poor performance on the court. London wins the lead in a Devils promo over Jamie as a side bet in a high-stakes strip poker game. German and Lionel have sex in her car. Jude gets jealous when Jamie sets Noah up with a closeted movie star. With Miami coming to LA to play the Devils, Eve fans the flames of their animosity toward Derek, and a fight breaks out on the court. Derek and Jude's feud comes to a head. Derek and London hook up.
37	4	"Number's Up"	Bille Woodruff	Sarah E. Fahey	July 31, 2018	0.46
Pax's training by Kyle brings results, and encouragement from Derek. Noah produces a profile of Jude. Pax finds out that one of his lovers is married to Commissioner Matthews, which Eve uses to her own ends. Jamie sees Derek and London together. Noah asks Jude about Zero, and Jude breaks things off. Eve and German have sex.
38	5	"End Game"	George Bamber	Carla Banks Waddles	August 7, 2018	0.35
Jude resists Matthews' demand that he kick Pax off the team. Jamie tells a reporter about Derek and London's secret relationship, which brings the affair to an end. Kyle uncovers all of Eve's machinations, and confronts her. Jude admits to Noah that he is scared of what happened with Zero happening again, but wants to try with Noah. When Jude announces his intent to keep Pax, Lionel keeps Matthews in check by threatening to expose his wife's indiscretions. Her true motivations revealed, Eve declares war.
39	6	"Hot Streak"	George Bamber	Kristen Saberre	August 14, 2018	0.35
Beau returns; Kyle is furious that he stayed away so long, but eventually gives in to her attraction. Eve meets with Oscar, who tells her that German is the person who actually killed Olivia. Noah gets a lucrative job offer in New York, but turns it down for Jude. Derek and Jamie have sex. Eve calls German out. London reunites with Derek and shares a magazine cover with Jamie, who goes to Eve for help against London. Beau proposes to Kyle, who accepts—and then learns he is broke. Oscar gives Jude the means to neutralize Eve.
40	7	"Foul"	James LaRosa	Holly Henderson	August 21, 2018	0.39
Derek and London go public with their relationship. Eve tasks Jamie to secure proof that Jude used to provide Derek with cocaine. Matthews fires Eve, and Lionel tries to convince Eve to drop her vendetta. Noah records German implicating himself in a crime. Jude tells Noah the truth about his past with Derek, and Matthews' ultimatum. Noah breaks things off with Jude. Kyle marries Beau. London and Jamie's rivalry comes to a head. Eve convinces Pax to help her destroy the Devils. Jamie has sex with Pax.
41	8	"Final Seconds"	James LaRosa	James LaRosa	August 28, 2018	0.32
Pax does Eve's bidding and sabotages the Devils' chances at the championship. Curtis proposes to London, but she refuses him. Kyle is pregnant. Jude and Lionel confront Pierce, who tells them about Pax. Derek faces off with Pax, who plays for real, and the Devils win. Jude and Noah kiss on the court, and reunite. Curtis corners London, who learns that he has been stalking her. Lionel and German stop Eve from jumping off the roof. Curtis is murdered. Jamie leaks Noah's recording of German's confession to the press, igniting a scandal intended to destroy the Devils.
