= Brent Antonello =

American actor (born 1989)

- Born: August 25, 1989 (age 36); Fort Lauderdale, Florida, U.S.
- Occupation: Actor
- Years active: 2010–present
- Partner: Taylor Ackerman-Antonello (m. 2023)
- Children: 1

Brent W. Antonello (born August 25, 1989) is an American actor, best known for his roles of Jude Kinkade in VH1's Hit the Floor and Detective Jamie Whelan on NBC's Law & Order: Organized Crime.

== Career ==
Antonello began playing sports agent Jude Kinkade on Hit the Floor in 2014.

In 2018, Antonello appeared as Hank Sullivan on The CW's Dynasty reboot.

From 2022 to 2023, Antonello was part of the main cast of NBC's Law & Order: Organized Crime in the role of Detective Jamie Whelan, whose character died at the end of season 3.

== Filmography ==
Year	Title	Role	Notes
2010	One Fine Sunday	David	Short film
2010	Moment of Clarity	James Poe	Short film
2013	Apex	Lucas	Unsold television pilot
2014	Castle	Luca Tessaro	Episode: "Bad Santa"
2014–2018	Hit the Floor	Jude Kinkade	Main cast (seasons 2–4)
2016	Beyond Doubt	AJ Stocker	Short film
2017	S.W.A.T.	Cash	Episode: "Imposters"
2017	A Lover Betrayed	Conall Winters	Feature film
2018–2019	Dynasty	Hank Sullivan	Recurring role (seasons 1–2)
2022	A Jazzman's Blues	John	Feature film
2022–2023	Law & Order: Organized Crime	Detective Jamie Whelan	Main cast (season 3)
2023	Law & Order: Special Victims Unit	Detective Jamie Whelan	Season 24: Episode 22; Guest star: "All Pain Is One Malady"
