= Lifestories =

American medical drama television series

- Genre: Medical drama
- Created by: Jeffrey Lewis
- Narrated by: Robert Prosky
- Country of origin: United States
- Original language: English
- No. of seasons: 1

Production
- Executive producer: Jeffrey Lewis
- Running time: 45 minutes
- Production companies: Jeffrey Lewis Productions; Ohlmeyer Communications Company; Orion Television Entertainment

Original release
- Network: NBC
- Release: August 20, 1990 – July 14, 1991

Lifestories (originally Signs of Life) is an American medical drama television series that premiered August 20, 1990, on NBC. Done in a documentary style with off-screen narration by Robert Prosky, Lifestories was an attempt to make an extremely realistic medical drama answering questions like, "What is it like to be told that you have advanced colon cancer?", and "Exactly what goes on during the first 45 minutes of a heart attack?", such as in the show's first and third episodes, starring Richard Masur as the character Don Chapin, and Michael Murphy as the character Frank Roberts, respectively.

== Episodes ==
No.	Title	Original release date
1	"Don Chapin"	August 20, 1990
Don Chapin (Richard Masur), an executive in the construction industry, is diagnosed with colon cancer. Also starring Lisa Banes.
2	"Rebecca McManus and Steve Arnold"	September 30, 1990
A childless couple in their 40s (Lindsay Crouse and Dwight Schultz) pursue a variety of fertility options.
3	"Frank Brody"	October 7, 1990
Following a heart attack, efforts to save retired Naval officer Frank Brody's (Michael Murphy) life are counted, on-screen, and in real time. Also starring Susan Blakely.
4	"Beverly Whitestone, Dan Drabowski, Sadie Maxwell, Lois Barnes"	October 14, 1990
Following four patients (Natalija Nogulich, Robert Pine, Debra Stipe and Micole Mercurio) in a day at a plastic surgery clinic on the same day.
5	"Wes, Laurie, Georgia"	October 28, 1990
6	"Jerry Forchette"	November 4, 1990
An exterminator (Louis Giambalvo) has an inoperable brain tumor. Also starring Giancarlo Esposito.
7	"Art Conforti"	November 11, 1990
A husband (Stanley Tucci) stages an intervention to save his wife (Finn Carter) from alcoholism. Also starring Stephen Tobolowsky.
8	"The Hawkins Family"	December 2, 1990
Parents (Chris Cooper and Wendy Phillips) search for the child they gave up for adoption 15 years earlier (Nicky Katt) in hopes of obtaining bone marrow for their son (Matthew Lawrence). Also starring Nicholas Pryor.
9	"Steve Burdick"	December 18, 1990
A gay TV anchorman (D.W. Moffett) loses his lover to AIDS and is HIV-positive himself. He tells their story on the air. Also starring Joyce Hyser.
10	"Darryl Tevis"	July 14, 1991
A high school basketball player (Don Barnes) suffers a stroke. Also starring CCH Pounder and Tim Russ.

== "Steve Burdick" controversy ==
"Steve Burdick" was originally scheduled to air on December 2, 1990. Had it aired on that date it would have been one of several programs relating to AIDS airing in early December, which has been designated as World AIDS Month (December 1 being World AIDS Day). Gay and AIDS activists accused NBC of pulling the episode out of fear of advertiser backlash, a charge that NBC denied. A network spokesperson also denied that network schedulers were aware of World AIDS Month and, in a perhaps unfortunate choice of phrase, characterized the decision to pull the episode as a "straight programming decision". Series producer Jeffrey Lewis also believed there was an economic motive, saying "I suspect a show about AIDS would not be popular with advertisers — particularly (when it focused on) a gay person with AIDS." NBC changed Lifestories from a weekly series to a monthly one in December and on December 5 confirmed that "Steve Burdick" would be the first of the monthly episodes aired.
