= Steve Burdick =

- Lifestories episode
- Episode no.: Season 1 Episode 9
- Directed by: Aaron Lipstadt
- Written by: Richard Gollance
- Original air date: December 18, 1990

Episode chronology
← Previous "The Hawkins Family"	Next → "Darryl Tevis"

"Steve Burdick" is an episode of the 1990 NBC television series Lifestories, an anthology drama that each week followed a new set of characters dealing with a medical issue. The episode revolves around Burdick (D. W. Moffett), a gay television newsman with AIDS. When his lover dies of the disease, Burdick reveals his own diagnosis on the air to the displeasure of his station manager. The episode was loosely based on Paul Wynne, a newscaster out of San Francisco who died of AIDS in 1990.

The episode was originally scheduled for December 2, 1990. However, NBC pulled the episode, sparking criticism from gay and AIDS activists. By failing to run this episode, NBC was the only major network not to broadcast a show around World AIDS day. The Gay & Lesbian Alliance Against Defamation (GLAAD) met with NBC on December 6 to discuss this and other issues. NBC told GLAAD that the cancellation was prompted by Lifestories' low ratings and that the feeling about a boy requiring a bone marrow transplant would have more appeal at the show's 8pm Sunday time slot. GLAAD asked that the Lifestories AIDS episode be rescheduled immediately. They also requested a mother meeting to discuss programming, to which NBC agreed.

The network rescheduled it for December 18, when Lifestories was changed from being a weekly series to a monthly special. The episode was critically acclaimed, winning a GLAAD Media Award, but financially unsuccessful for the network.

== Synopsis ==
Steve Burdick is a local television news anchor who keeps his homosexuality private. He and his lover are tested for HIV and both test positive. Burdick struggles to keep himself together as his lover's health declines. When his lover dies, Burdick breaks down on the air and announces the death and that he too is HIV-positive. Station managers want to fire him, but his producer, Barbara Hudson, convinces the station that AIDS reportage is newsworthy and socially responsible. Burdick's pieces are tagged with a viewer discretion advisory. He continues to report until he begins to show symptoms of AIDS, at which time the station managers pull him off the air.

== Cast ==
- Robert Prosky – Storyteller (voice)
- D.W. Moffett – Steve Burdick
- Joyce Hyser – Barbara Hudson

== Scheduling controversy ==
"Steve Burdick" was originally scheduled to air on December 2, 1990. Had it aired on that date it would have been one of several programs relating to AIDS airing in early December, which is designated World AIDS Month, with December 1 being World AIDS Day. Gay and AIDS activists accused NBC of pulling the episode out of fear of advertiser backlash, a charge that NBC denied. A network spokesperson also denied that network schedulers were aware of World AIDS Month and, in a perhaps unfortunate choice of phrase, characterized the decision to pull the episode as a "straight programming decision". Series producer Jeffrey Lewis also believed there was an economic motive, saying "I suspect a show about AIDS would not be popular with advertisers — particularly (when it focused on) a gay person with AIDS." NBC changed Lifestories from a weekly series to a monthly one in December and on December 5 confirmed that "Steve Burdick" would be the first of the monthly episodes aired.

== Reception ==
"Steve Burdick" was well received by critics. The Seattle Times described the episode as "as honest an exploration of AIDS as anything seen on commercial network TV". Moffett's performance was singled out for praise, as was Richard Gollance's script, for "look[ing] at a number of aspects of the AIDS problem, exploring a variety of attitudes about it". The Times marks this as the best episode of the series. The Hartford Courant concurred in this assessment, citing the episode as the most memorable of one of the season's most daring new series. Gollance's script was also praised by critic Jon Burlingame, writing for United Features Syndicate, for delivering accurate information on AIDS and HIV. Burlingame called the episode "as much an indictment of commercial television for its skittishness in dealing with the AIDS crisis as it is a show about AIDS patients" and speculated that this may have been the reason NBC initially pulled it. He cited this episode, along with two AIDS-themed episodes of NBC's Midnight Caller (themselves the subject of protests from gay and AIDS activists), as "network series TV's finest AIDS-related dramas to date". Right-wing activists criticized dialogue from the episode in which Burdick overhears his hospital roommate in prayer and admonishes him that he didn't pay attention well enough in church to learn that God ignores the prayers of "faggots".

"Steve Burdick" scored a Nielsen rating of 9.7, equating to approximately 9.5 million viewers, and a 17 share, meaning that 17% of all television sets in use during its time period were tuned to the episode. NBC reported losing $500,000 in advertising revenue. Speaking of this loss, then-NBC president Warren Littlefield said, at odds with NBC's earlier denial of possible revenue loss being a factor in its scheduling decision, "There are few things in broadcasting that we know for sure, and one of those is that when you do an episode of any series that deals with AIDS, there is going to be advertiser sensitivity to it. And if you choose to do it anyway, you better count on losing money."

"Steve Burdick" won a GLAAD Media Award as the best television drama episode of 1990.
