= Michele Weaver =

American actress

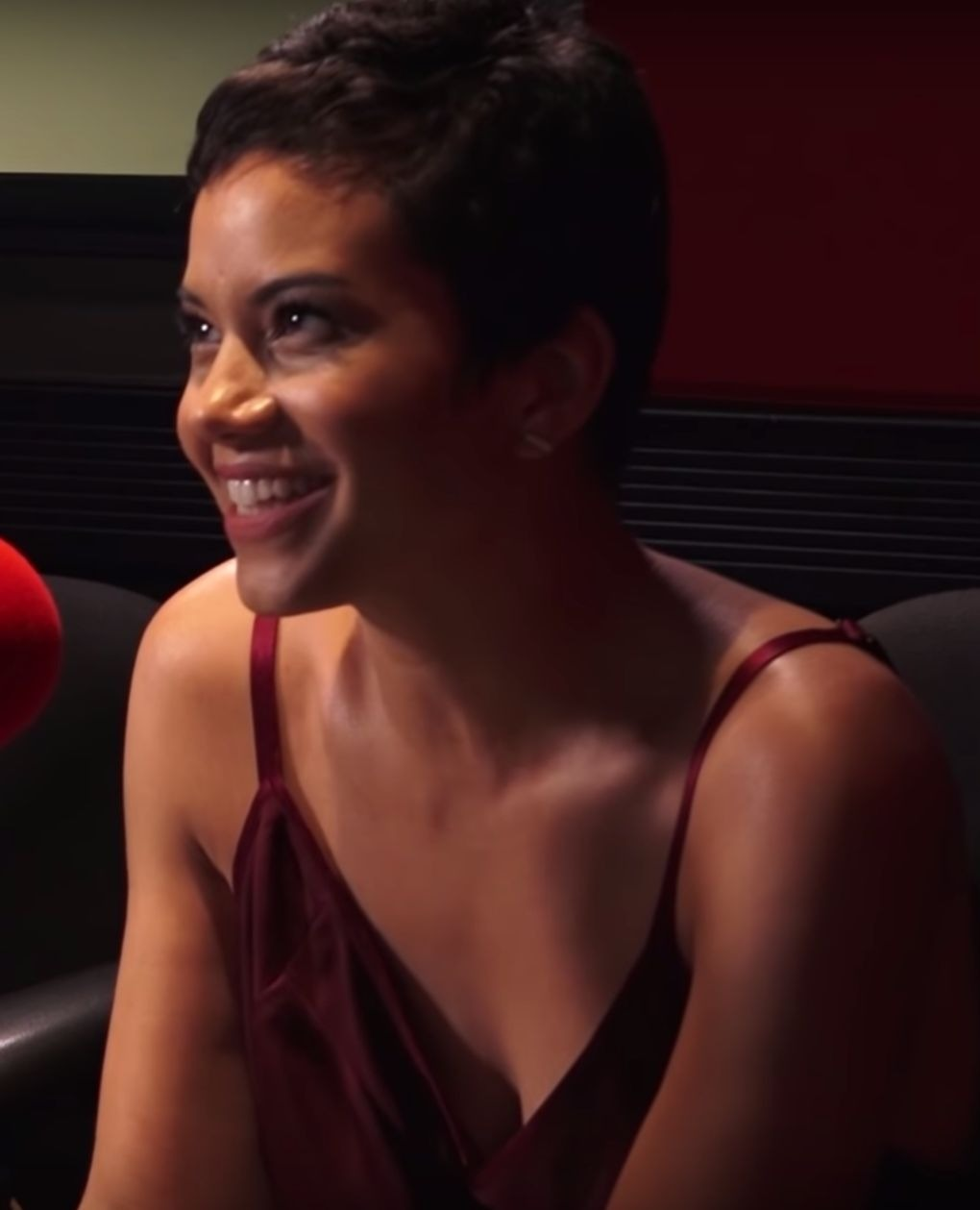
- Weaver in 2018
- Education: Pepperdine University
- Occupation: Actress
- Years active: 2011–present

Michele Weaver is an American actress, known for playing the leading role in the Oprah Winfrey Network romantic drama series Love Is.

== Early life ==
Weaver is the daughter of a Haitian mother and a father from Colorado. Weaver attended Pepperdine University and later began performing in theatre.

== Career ==
On screen, she began appearing in small films, and played secondary roles on television shows include Switched at Birth and Cooper Barrett's Guide to Surviving Life. She played bigger roles in the Syfy television film 2 Lava 2 Lantula (2016), and was co-lead in the thriller Illicit (2017) opposite David Ramsey and Vivica A. Fox.

In 2018, Weaver was cast in a leading role on the Oprah Winfrey Network romantic drama series, Love Is created by Mara Brock Akil and Salim Akil. The series is based on the Akils' relationship, the series told the story of a power couple navigating the landscape of black actors in Hollywood. On July 31, 2018, it was originally renewed for a second season, but on December 19, 2018, OWN reversed the decision and canceled the series after Salim Akil was accused of domestic violence and copyright infringement.

In 2019, Weaver appeared opposite Delta Burke, Tim Reid, Brooke Elliott in an episode of Netflix anthology series Dolly Parton's Heartstrings. In 2020, she starred in the short-lived NBC drama series Council of Dads.

== Filmography ==
=== Film ===
Year	Film	Role	Notes
2011	One Night at Monich's	Susan	Short
2012	Unidentified	Rebecca Copeland	Short
2012	Death Suspects a Murder	Sandra Elin	
2014	Emancipation	Imani	Short
2014	Diana Leigh	Diana Leigh	Short
2014	The Miracle of Tony Davis	Serena	Video
2015	The Daughters of Eve	Rebecca	Short
2015	Sister Code	Sonya	
2015	A Teacher's Obsession	Burly Shark	TV movie
2015	Evolution	-	Short
2016	Superpowerless	Brianne	
2016	2 Lava 2 Lantula	Raya West	TV movie
2017	Illicit	Faren	
2018	Cathedrals	Rita	Short
2019	Nighthawks	Alison	
2019	Portals	Frantic Caller (voice)	
2021	I Forgive	Gang Girl	
2022	Beverly H.	Morgan	
2023	Christmas of Yes	Amy Bell	TV movie

=== Television ===
Year	Film	Role	Notes
2013	The Cost of Living	Amber Gray	Main Cast
2014	Day Job	Emily	Episode: "Joining the Team!"
2015	Switched at Birth	Felicity	Episode: "How Does a Girl Like You Get to Be a Girl Like You"
2016	Cooper Barrett's Guide to Surviving Life	Attractive Girl	Episode: "How to Survive Your Crazy Ex"
2018	Love Is	Nuri Summers	Main Cast
2019	Dolly Parton's Heartstrings	Phyllis	Episode: "If I Had Wings"
2020	Briarpatch	Felicity Dill	Recurring Cast
2020	Council of Dads	Luly Perry	Main Cast
2022	Real Husbands of Hollywood	Akira	Main Cast
2023	Ahsoka	Lieutenant Callahan	Episode: "Part One: Master and Apprentice"
2025	The Pitt	Dolores Walker	Episode: "2:00 P.M."
2025	Sheriff Country	Cassidy	Main cast
