= Will Catlett =

American actor

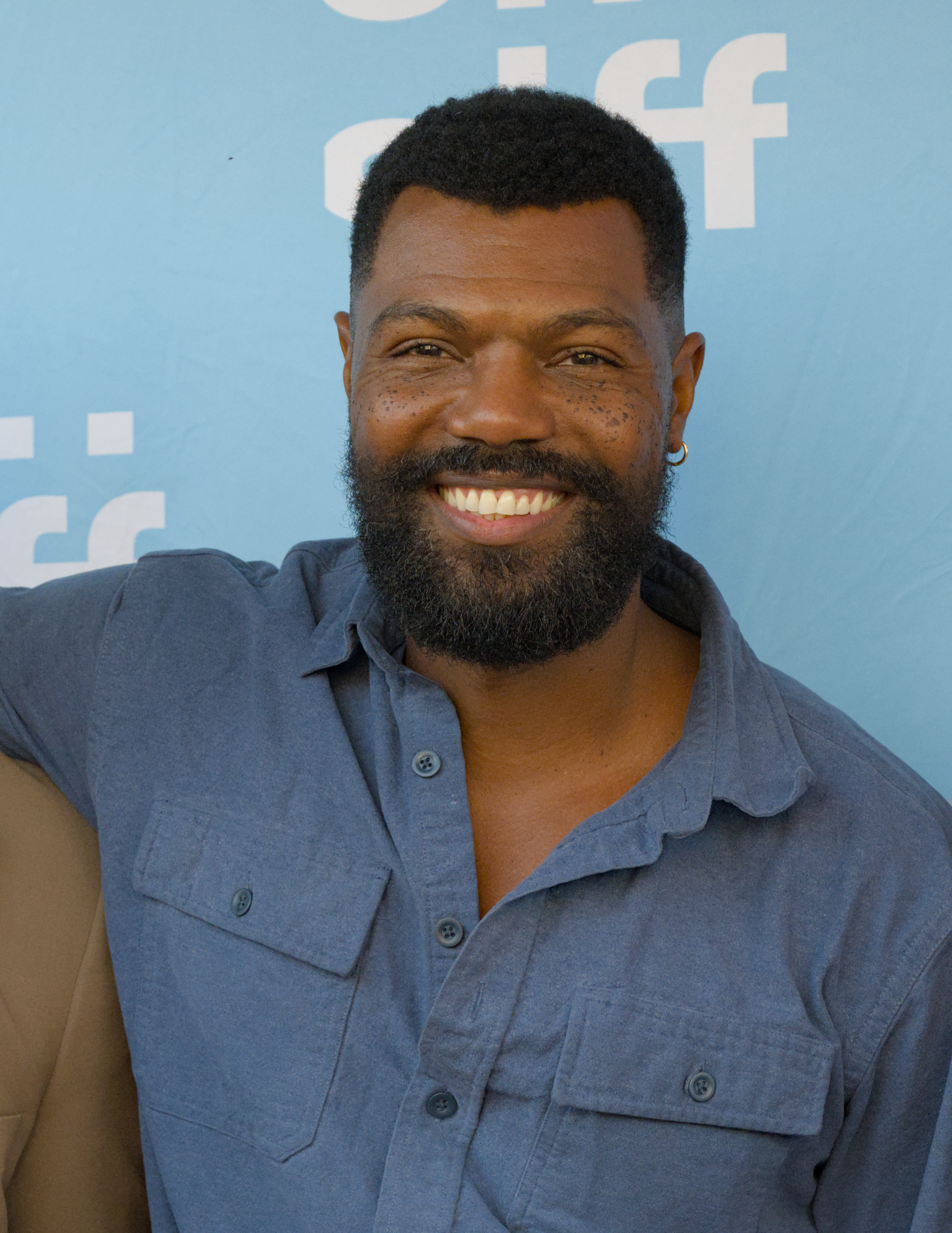
- Catlett in May 2025
- Born: Alexandria, Virginia, U.S.
- Occupations: Actor, producer
- Years active: 2012–present

William Catlett is an American actor and producer. He is best known for portraying 1997 Yasir Omar in Love Is, Latavius "Lala" Johnson in Black Lightning, Herschel in True Story, Paul Lancaster in Constellation and Levon Brooks in Crystal Lake.

== Early life ==
Catlett was born in Alexandria, Virginia. His father had ambitions to be an actor before he joined the military and worked in government.

== Career ==
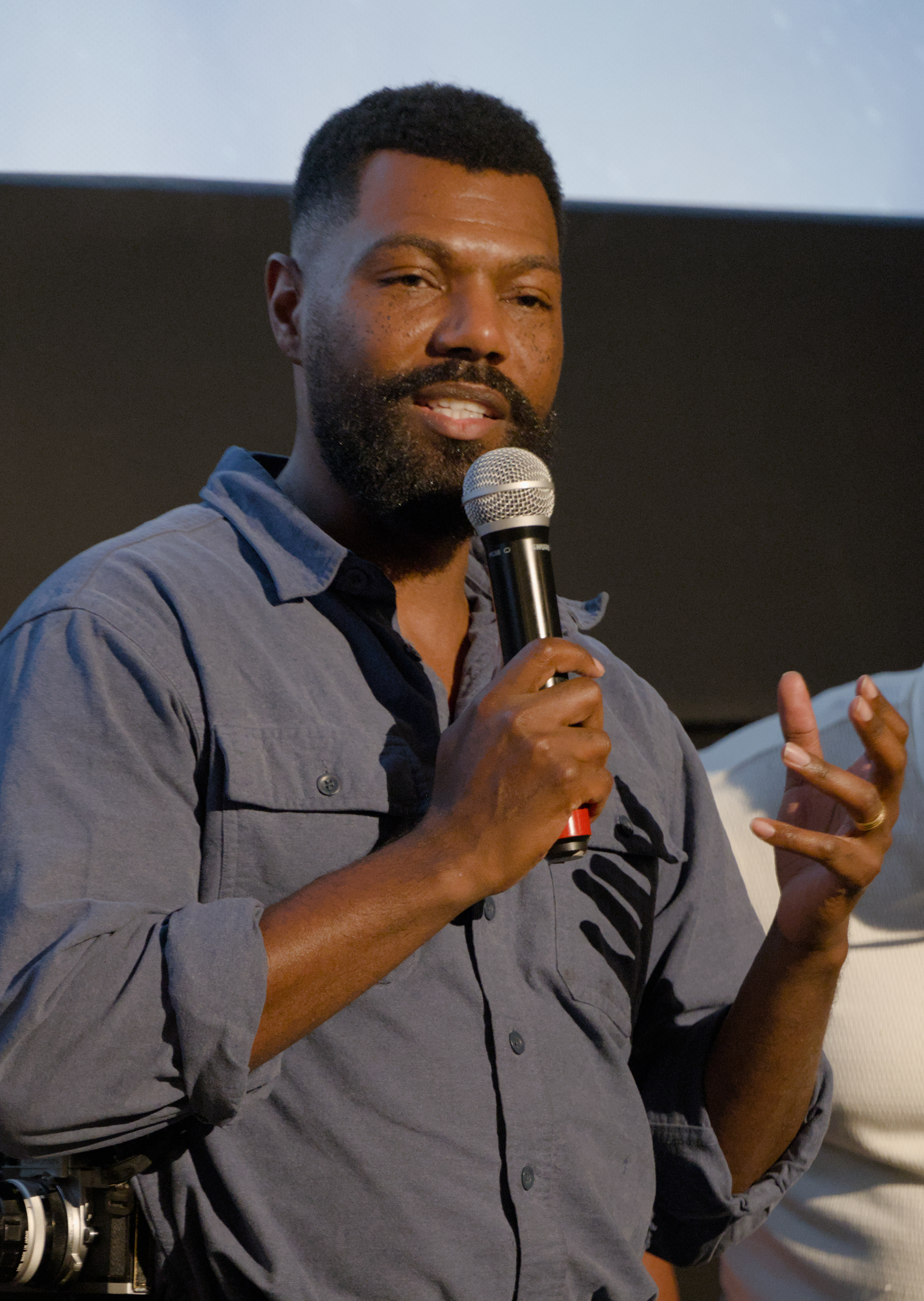
Will Catlett speaking at SIFF 2025

Catlett's early television credits include The Mentalist on CBS as well as Insecure and Brothers in Atlanta on HBO. He appeared in the 2018 Salim Akil and Mara Brock Akil television series Love Is, for which he was also in the writers room. He played the lead roles in Issa Rae’s YouTube series First and Black & Sexy TV’s That Guy. Catlett produced Giants for Issa Rae Presents, the short film Stages, in which he also stars and the television series Garden Hills.

Catlett later worked again with Salim Akil and Mara Brock Akil on Black Lightning portraying Latavius "Lala" Jackson of the 100. He appeared in the 2020 film Charm City Kings. In 2021, he could be seen with Kevin Hart, Wesley Snipes and Billy Zane in Netflix comedy thriller True Story. For that role, was nominated for Outstanding Supporting Actor in a Television Movie, Limited-Series or Dramatic Special at the 53rd NAACP Image Awards. He also appeared in the television series Lovecraft Country. In 2023, he appeared in A.V. Rockwell's film A Thousand and One as Lucky. He appeared in the 2024 comedy horror film Abigail portraying Rickles, a sniper who is part of a group that kidnap the titular character (Alisha Weir). He is a series regular in the Apple TV+ series Constellation, playing Paul Lancaster.

== Personal life ==
He is the founder of Catlett Academy.

== Partial filmography ==
=== Film ===
†	Denotes works that have not yet been released

Year	Title	Role	Notes
2020	Charm City Kings	Detective Rivers	
2020	Force of Nature	Griffin	
2023	A Thousand and One	Lucky	
2024	Abigail	Rickles	
2024	Color Book	Lucky	
2024	Never Let Go	Poppa	

=== Television ===
†	Denotes works that have not yet been released

Year	Title	Role	Notes
2012–2015	That Guy	Mike	17 episodes
2013	The Mentalist	Patient	Episode: "Red, White and Blue"
2014–2015	First	Charles	15 episodes
2015	Born Again Virgin	Anderson	Episode: "Off to See the Wizard"
2017	Giants	Flip	4 episodes
2018	Love Is	1997 Yasir Omar	Main role
2018–2021	Black Lightning	Latavius "Lala" Jackson	Recurring role
2020	Lovecraft Country	Verton Freeman	Episode: "Rewind 1921"
2021	True Story	Herschel	Main role
2022	The Last Days of Ptolemy Grey	Ezra Bundle	Episode: "Sensia"
2024	Constellation	Paul Lancaster	Main role
2025	Forever	Quincy Clark	2 episodes
2026	Crystal Lake	Levon Brooks	Main role; 7 episodes
