= Dolly Parton's Heartstrings =

American anthology dramedy television series

- Genre: Anthology; Dramedy
- Based on: the stories and songs by Dolly Parton
- Country of origin: United States
- Original language: English
- No. of seasons: 1
- No. of episodes: 8

Production
- Executive producers: Dolly Parton; Sam Haskell; Patrick Sean Smith
- Editor: Maysie Hoy
- Running time: 56–85 minutes
- Production companies: Dixie Pixie Productions; Magnolia Hill Entertainment; Warner Bros. Television; Sandollar Productions

Original release
- Network: Netflix
- Release: November 22, 2019

Dolly Parton's Heartstrings, or simply Heartstrings, is an American anthology dramedy television series that premiered on November 22, 2019, on Netflix.

== Premise ==
Dolly Parton's Heartstrings showcases "the stories, memories and inspirations behind Parton's most beloved songs."

== Production ==
=== Development ===
On June 4, 2018, it was announced that Netflix had given the production, then untitled, a series order for a first season consisting of eight episodes. Executive producers were expected to include Dolly Parton and Sam Haskell. Production companies involved with the series were slated to consist of Dixie Pixie Productions, Magnolia Hill Entertainment, Warner Bros. Television, and Sandollar Productions. The New York Times reported that the show was inspired by the WNYC podcast Dolly Parton's America.

In November 2018, it was reported that the series had been titled Dolly Parton's Heartstrings, that it would premiere in 2019, and that Patrick Sean Smith would serve as the series' showrunner and as an additional executive producer. Additionally, it was further reported that episodes would be based upon the songs "Jolene", "These Old Bones", and "If I Had Wings". All of the episodes were set to be written by Jim Strain with Joe Lazarov directing "These Old Bones" and Timothy Busfield directing "If I Had Wings". On December 19, 2018, it was announced that Terry McDonough would direct an episode based on the song "JJ Sneed" from another script by Strain. On February 11, 2019, it was announced that the other four episodes would be based upon the songs "Two Doors Down", "Down from Dover", "Sugar Hill", and "Cracker Jack". "Two Doors Down" was set to be directed by Wendey Stanzler from a script by Mark B. Perry, "Down From Dover" to be directed by Erica Dunton from a script by John Sacret Young, "Sugar Hill" to be directed by Lev L. Spiro from a script by Thomas Ian Griffith and Mary Page Keller, and "Cracker Jack" to be directed by Liesl Tommy from a script by Lisa Melamed.

=== Casting ===
Alongside the series order announcement, it was confirmed that Dolly Parton would appear in the series. In November 2018, it was announced that Julianne Hough, Kimberly Williams-Paisley, and Dallas Roberts had been cast in the episode "Jolene", that Kathleen Turner, Ginnifer Goodwin, and Kyle Bornheimer had been cast in the episode "These Old Bones", and that Gerald McRaney, Brooke Elliott, Ben Lawson, Michele Weaver, Delta Burke, and Tim Reid had been cast in the episode "If I Had Wings". On December 19, 2018, it was reported that Colin O'Donoghue, Willa Fitzgerald, David Denman, Mac Davis, and Vanessa Rubio had been cast in the episode "JJ Sneed". On February 11, 2019, it was announced that Melissa Leo, Ray McKinnon, Andy Mientus, Katie Stevens, and Michael Willett had been cast in the episode "Two Doors Down", Holly Taylor, Shane McGhie, Robert Taylor, Bellamy Young, Camryn Manheim, and Mary Lane Haskell had been cast in the episode "Down From Dover", Patricia Wettig, Timothy Busfield, Virginia Gardner, and Tom Brittney had been cast in the episode "Sugar Hill", and that Sarah Shahi, Rochelle Aytes, Jessica Collins, and Tammy Lynn Michaels had been cast in the episode "Cracker Jack". Sara Boustany played the role of 14-year-old Lucy Jane.

=== Filming ===
Principal photography for the series commenced in September 2018 in Georgia. Filming occurred in locations that month such as Cartersville, Stone Mountain, Kennesaw, and at Third Rail Studios in Doraville. In October 2018, filming took place in such locations as Milton, Canton, the Orange United Methodist Church in Lathemtown, and Emory Hospital in Smyrna. In November 2018, shooting moved to locales including Norcross, Gainesville, Cumming. In December 2018, the production was working out of Snellville, Loganville, and downtown Canton. In January 2019, shooting was held in various areas like the Tucker Recreation Center in Tucker, Georgia and Marietta Square in Marietta, Georgia.

== Episodes ==
No.	Title	Directed by	Written by	Original release date
1	"Jolene"	Andrew Fleming	Patrick Sean Smith	November 22, 2019
Emily (Kimberly Williams-Paisley) befriends attractive young bartender/singer-songwriter Jolene (Julianne Hough) at a local honky-tonk bar and hires Jolene as her son’s guitar teacher. But with her own marriage to Aaron (Dallas Roberts) stuck in a rut and Jolene’s revelation that she doesn't shy away from dating married men, Emily becomes increasingly insecure. Cast: Julianne Hough, Kimberly Williams-Paisley, Dallas Roberts, Dolly Parton, Braxton Bjerken, Wynn Everett & Scott Reeves
2	"Two Doors Down"	Wendey Stanzler	Mark B. Perry	November 22, 2019
When Tyler Meegers (Andy Mientus) returns to his hometown for his sister’s wedding, he's hiding a secret from his family; he's gay. But Tyler isn't the only family member hiding a secret or struggling and amid the stress of the wedding, tensions start to boil over. Cast: Melissa Leo, Ray McKinnon, Andy Mientus, Katie Stevens & Michael J. Willett
3	"If I Had Wings"	Timothy Busfield	Jim Strain	November 22, 2019
When her partner Tom’s (Gerald McRaney) birthday is around the corner, Ellie (Delta Burke) decides to invite Tom’s estranged children in an attempt to finally reconnect a family that's been broken up for decades. But Tom and his children might not be willing to face their past. Cast: Gerald McRaney, Brooke Elliott, Ben Lawson, Michele Weaver, Delta Burke & Tim Reid
4	"Cracker Jack"	Liesl Tommy	Lisa Melamed	November 22, 2019
Lucy Jane (Sarah Shahi), Monica (Jessica Collins), Bitsy (Tammy Lynn Michaels) and Scarlett (Rochelle Aytes) have been best friends since childhood. Although they used to share everything, their lives have taken unexpected turns and, over the course of a weekend, the friends find out there is a lot to catch up on. Cast: Sarah Shahi, Rochelle Aytes, Jessica Collins & Tammy Lynn Michaels
5	"Down from Dover"	Erica Dunton	John Sacret Young	November 22, 2019
In 1968, Delilah Covern (Holly Taylor) accepts a marriage proposal from Lincoln Dollarhyde (Shane Paul McGhie), but Delilah’s father (Robert Taylor) cannot accept an interracial relationship; especially after Lincoln voices support for controversial school teacher Helen Cunningham (Mary Lane Haskell). Soon, however, an even bigger challenge presents itself when Delilah discovers she is pregnant. Cast: Holly Taylor, Shane Paul McGhie, Robert Taylor, Bellamy Young, Camryn Manheim, Quinn Cooke & Mary Lane Haskell
6	"Sugar Hill"	Lev L. Spiro	Thomas Ian Griffith & Mary Page Keller	November 22, 2019
Logan Cantrell (Timothy Busfield) travels down memory lane, remembering various episodes from his long relationship with Harper Benning (Patricia Wettig). Having met in childhood, Logan and Harper have shared many ups and downs together. Cast: Patricia Wettig, Timothy Busfield, Virginia Gardner, Tom Brittney, Mark Ashworth & Don Henderson Baker
7	"J.J. Sneed"	Terry McDonough	Jim Strain	November 22, 2019
Enchanted by the stories of Calamity Jane, adventurous Maddie Hawkins (Willa Fitzgerald), is desperate to avoid her arranged marriage and lead a life of her own making. Then she meets wanted outlaw J.J. Sneed (Colin O'Donoghue) who provides a way out. Drawn by J.J.’s charm, Maddie becomes his accomplice, but can she ever really trust a thief? Cast: Colin O'Donoghue, Willa Fitzgerald, David Denman, Mac Davis, Vanessa Rubio & Dolly Parton
8	"These Old Bones"	Joe Lazarov	Jim Strain	November 22, 2019
In 1944, Genevieve Carson (Ginnifer Goodwin) is given the chance of a lifetime when she's asked to represent a large timber company in a lawsuit against Miss Mary "Bones" Shaw (Kathleen Turner), a clairvoyant mountain woman. Although Genevieve’s life is about to take a dramatic turn, it is in ways she never would have guessed. Cast: Kathleen Turner, Ginnifer Goodwin, Kyle Bornheimer, Tyler Crumley, Michael Goodwin, Mary Donnelly Haskell, Lindsay Ayliffe & Ed Amatrudo

== Reception ==
On Rotten Tomatoes, the series holds an approval rating of 50% based on critic reviews, with an average rating of 5.94/10. On Metacritic, it has a weighted average score of 72 out of 100 based on reviews from 4 critics, indicating "generally favorable reviews".

The episode "Two Doors Down" received a GLAAD Media Award for Outstanding Individual Episode at the 31st GLAAD Awards. The episode "These Old Bones" was nominated for a 2020 Primetime Emmy Award for Outstanding Television Movie and won the Faith & Freedom award at the 2020 MovieGuide Awards.
