= Zero Day (American TV series) =

American television miniseries

- Genre: Political thriller
- Created by: Eric Newman; Noah Oppenheim; Michael Schmidt
- Showrunner: Eric Newman
- Directed by: Lesli Linka Glatter
- Starring: Robert De Niro; Lizzy Caplan; Jesse Plemons; Joan Allen; Connie Britton; Bill Camp; Dan Stevens; Matthew Modine; Angela Bassett; McKinley Belcher III; Ryan Spahn
- Music by: Jeff Russo
- Country of origin: United States
- Original language: English
- No. of episodes: 6

Production
- Executive producers: Robert De Niro; Eric Newman; Noah Oppenheim; Jonathan Glickman; Lesli Linka Glatter; Michael Schmidt
- Cinematography: John Conroy
- Running time: 43–58 minutes
- Production companies: Grand Electric Productions; Prologue Entertainment; Canal Productions, Inc.; Glickmania; Whatever Lola Wants Productions, Inc.

Original release
- Network: Netflix
- Release: February 20, 2025

Zero Day is an American political thriller television miniseries created by Eric Newman, Noah Oppenheim, and Michael Schmidt for Netflix, directed by Lesli Linka Glatter, and featuring an ensemble cast led by Robert De Niro. It is about a former president investigating a devastating zero-day cyberattack in the US. The series was released on Netflix on February 20, 2025, and received mixed reviews from critics.

== Synopsis ==
A former President of the United States is given vast powers by his successor to investigate an unprecedented cyberterrorist attack on the United States that resulted in thousands of deaths.

== Cast ==
=== Main ===
- Robert De Niro as George Mullen, a popular former President, former prosecutor, and Vietnam War veteran appointed as chairman of a special commission established to identify the perpetrators behind a deadly act of cyberterrorism known as "Zero Day"
- Lizzy Caplan as Alexandra Mullen, the Congressional representative from New York's 10th District and estranged daughter of George and Sheila Mullen, who is tapped to monitor her father as a ranking member of the Zero Day Commission Oversight Committee
- Jesse Plemons as Roger Carlson, an experienced but troubled political operative working as a personal aide to the President of the United States ("body man") for Mullen
- Joan Allen as Sheila Mullen, former First Lady who is currently nominated for a judgeship on the U.S. 2nd Circuit Court of Appeals
- Connie Britton as Valerie Whitesell, the Zero Day Commission chief of staff who served as White House Chief of Staff in Mullen's administration
- Bill Camp as Jeremy Lasch, the Director of the CIA
- Dan Stevens as Evan Green, a popular and radical political commentator and host of The Evan Green Show, who becomes Mullen's most outspoken critic
- Matthew Modine as Richard Dreyer, the current Speaker of the House and a United States Representative from Ohio
- Angela Bassett as President Evelyn Mitchell, who appoints Mullen as head of the Zero Day Commission
- McKinley Belcher III as Carl Otieno, an Assistant United States Attorney and Zero Day Commission lead investigator

=== Recurring ===
- Clark Gregg as Robert Lyndon, a Wall Street billionaire, corporate businessman and political influencer affiliated with Carlson
- Gaby Hoffmann as Monica Kidder, a Silicon Valley tech mogul and CEO of Panoply, subject of an anti-trust investigation
- Mark Ivanir as Natan, a former Mossad operative who provides intelligence to Mullen
- Mozhan Navabi as Melissa Kornblau, the Communications Director and head of public relations for the Zero Day Commission
- Hannah Gross as Anna Sindler, a writer hired by Mullen to help write his memoirs
- Cuyle Carvin as Special Agent Tom McCarthy, the supervisor of Mullen's Secret Service detail
- Eden Lee as Special Agent Angela Kim, head of the FBI National Cyber Investigative Joint Task Force
- Ryan Spahn as Blake "Leon" Felton, a member of The Reapers, a radical left wing terrorist organization
- Colin Donnell as Erik Hayes

== Episodes ==
No.	Episode	Directed by	Written by	Original release date
1	Episode 1	Lesli Linka Glatter	Teleplay by : Noah Oppenheim & Eric Newman; Story by : Noah Oppenheim & Eric Newman & Michael Schmidt	February 20, 2025
At his residence in New York, near the Tappan Zee Bridge, former president George Mullen is visited by Anna Sindler, a prospective ghost writer for his memoirs. Sindler's car is struck by a train at a railroad crossing as energy, telecommunications, and transportation networks are affected by a massive nationwide cyberattack, dubbed 'Zero Day', causing disasters that kill thousands. After Mullen delivers an impassioned speech on the disaster efforts in New York City, he accepts an appointment from President Evelyn Mitchell to head the Zero Day Commission investigating the attack, despite his daughter, Congresswoman Alexandra Mullen, pleading with him to turn it down. After a briefing from CIA Director Jeremy Lasch, Mullen receives intelligence from a former Mossad operative, Natan, that Russia was responsible. Mullen experiences unusual events, including mysterious music and spotting Sindler in a crowd. His failure to recognize a notebook left in his safe, or a member of his household staff, lead him to angry confrontations, leaving his mental state unknown.
2	Episode 2	Lesli Linka Glatter	Noah Oppenheim & Eric Newman	February 20, 2025
Mullen is introduced to his colleagues in the Zero Day Commission, while Alexandra is appointed by House Speaker Richard Dreyer to head an oversight committee to monitor the Commission. Mullen links his notebook filled with erratic writing to memories of cryptic phone calls, and the Commission is alerted to a hackers' collective massacred in the Bronx by a rogue Russian GRU agent, with the lone survivor identified as a former National Security Agency employee. Roger Carlson, Mullen's longtime aide, learns that Sindler's body is missing, and is urged by billionaire Robert Lyndon to keep the investigation focused on Russia. The NSA employee is taken into custody, while the GRU agent is killed by another Russian operative, who gives Roger evidence exonerating Russia. Mitchell cancels retaliatory measures against Russia moments before a live address; instead, Mullen blames the attack on a radical left-wing domestic terrorist organization called the Reapers, claiming they have stolen a government cyber-weapon called 'Proteus'. Lasch informs Mitchell that Proteus is not what Mullen believes it to be.
3	Episode 3	Lesli Linka Glatter	Roberto Patino	February 20, 2025
Suspected Reapers are arrested across the country, but political commentator Evan Green, an outspoken critic of Mullen, stirs up public outcry when a 17-year-old minor is wrongfully detained. Mullen throws away his medication, and continues to be plagued by a mysterious song, (Note: Mullen keeps hearing a 1979 Sex Pistols song, "Who Killed Bambi?") while Sheila convinces his former chief of staff Valerie Whitesell to rejoin his team, despite Sheila (and Alexandra) knowing that Mullen fathered her 12-year-old daughter. Roger has Sindler's casket exhumed and DNA appears to confirm her death, but he is warned by Natan that Mullen should abandon his investigation. Mullen personally interrogates a suspect, Erik Hayes, forcing him to cooperate by threatening his family. Targeted by Green, Lyndon blackmails Roger into submitting photographs to Mullen tying Green to Hayes. Fed up with Green's vitriolic attacks, Mullen has him arrested without a warrant, while Roger discovers Mullen's notebook of paranoid thoughts. Alexandra and Roger resume their previous relationship, and Whitesell confronts Lasch, who denies that Proteus has been reactivated.
4	Episode 4	Lesli Linka Glatter	Eli Attie	February 20, 2025
Another cyberattack shuts down a major bank, leading Mitchell to order a weekend freeze on banking transactions, stoking nationwide unrest. In detention, Green antagonizes Mullen and Commission investigator Carl Otieno, but reveals the identities of several Reapers. Whitesell tracks down the last surviving scientist who worked on Proteus, a neurological weapon to inflict long-range brain trauma. She reports her findings to Mullen, and they suspect he is being targeted, creating a makeshift SCIF tent in his office. Roger ties radio equipment recovered from the Reapers to Lyndon, and discovers the group is communicating via a mysterious frequency. Alexandra calls Sheila, having inexplicably learned of her father's cognitive problems. Mullen and Whitesell inform Sheila of their suspicions, and he passes a series of cognitive tests, but has Green tortured. After unknown operatives blackmail Roger to force Mullen to recuse himself from the Commission, Roger instead comes clean to Alexandra, which inexplicably leads the operatives to kill Roger and stage his death as a drug overdose. Mullen is reminded of the similar death of his son, and Dreyer orders Sheila to testify before Congress.
5	Episode 5	Lesli Linka Glatter	Dee Johnson	February 20, 2025
Released with the other detainees, Green publicizes the abuse he suffered, and the photographs Lyndon gave Roger are determined to be deepfakes. Appearing before the Oversight Committee, Sheila withstands Dreyer's political attacks against her husband. After Roger's funeral, Mullen discovers that Roger left him the secret radio communications he uncovered, linking Lyndon to the Reapers and allowing the Commission to crack the encrypted messages on their radio frequency. Given twenty-four hours by Mitchell before she replaces him with Dreyer, Mullen uses the frequency to entrap a Reaper, linking him to tech mogul Monica Kidder. With her compound surrounded, Kidder threatens to expose Mullen as the father of Whitesell's daughter, but her security team's communications are hijacked and Otieno is wounded in the ensuing shootout. Kidder is taken into custody, and her technology empire is implicated in the cyberattack, but she is found hanged in her cell. Unknown to the world, Alexandra and Dreyer are part of the Zero Day conspiracy, explaining how Alexandra knew of her father's cognitive problems, how she abetted Roger's murder, and why she tried to dissuade Mullen from heading the Commission.
6	Episode 6	Lesli Linka Glatter	Noah Oppenheim & Eric Newman	February 20, 2025
While Kidder is publicly declared Zero Day's mastermind, Alexandra confronts Dreyer and eight of their more than a dozen elected conspirators, accusing them of straying from their original plan – orchestrating the cyberattack, with support of Kidder and other powerful individuals, to manipulate public opinion and consolidate bipartisan, non-radical fringe, power within the government. The country is soon plunged into darkness by another attack, killing thousands more, and the Mullens' motorcade is overrun by violent protestors, but they are rescued by Lasch and his strike team. Lasch and Miller had suspected Dreyer and other government members, thus appointing Mullen because he was outside government. They spread the news that Mullen has been killed, allowing Sheila to join Whitesell and her daughter, while Mullen confronts a guilt-stricken Alexandra. Meeting face-to-face, Dreyer justifies his actions and leaves Mullen to grapple with the choice to expose the conspiracy, but implicate his own daughter. The Commission restores all services and removes all traces of the Zero Day malware, and Mitchell suggests they bury the truth for the greater good. Mullen accepts that Proteus may not exist and his symptoms were compounded by stress and grief. Presenting his final report to the nation in a live congressional address, Mullen reads a confession Alexandra left him, inspiring him to reveal the full truth and publicly name the conspirators, before returning to his private life and the nation's uncertain future. Back at his residence, Mullen burns the drafts for his planned memoirs.

== Production ==
It was reported in November 2022 that Eric Newman, Noah Oppenheim, and Michael Schmidt had conceived of the story, with Newman and Oppenheim writing the pilot script. With Robert De Niro attached to star, he would also serve as executive producer alongside Newman, Oppenheim, Jonathan Glickman of Panoramic Media, and Schmidt. The project was confirmed as greenlit by Netflix on March 1, 2023. Lesli Linka Glatter would direct. In April 2023, Lizzy Caplan, Jesse Plemons, Joan Allen, and Connie Britton were announced to have joined the cast. In December 2023, Bill Camp, Matthew Modine, Dan Stevens, McKinley Belcher III, Gaby Hoffmann, Mark Ivanir and Clark Gregg joined the cast. In February 2024, Mozhan Navabi joined the cast.

An application for filming a train crash was submitted in Westchester County, New York for July 2023. Filming had started in and around New York but production was suspended with crew and cast sent home in June 2023 due to the 2023 Writers Guild of America strike. Production resumed by that December. The series was released on February 20, 2025.

== Reception ==
On the review aggregator website Rotten Tomatoes reported a 54% approval rating based on 81 critic reviews. The website's critics consensus reads, "Zero Day has plenty of gravitas thanks to its all-star cast led by Robert De Niro, but this high-concept series' plotting is a little too goofy for it to take itself so seriously." Metacritic, which uses a weighted average, assigned a score of 52 out of 100 based on 39 critics, indicating "mixed or average" reviews.

Lucy Mangan of The Guardian described Zero Day as "an astonishing amount of fun – firmly grounded by De Niro and his portrait of a good man struggling to do the right thing in a world that offers corruption at worst, and only compromise at best." The Hollywood Reporter described the series in an unflattering review as a "The New York Times opinion section brought to life in its barely left-tilting centrism." "Tech oligarchs, the gerontocracy, podcasters spouting misinformation and the erosion of civil liberties all blur into a muddy soup that's adjacent to relevancy without ever achieving it", according to a review in Variety.

In a generally favorable review in the New York Times called the series "a contemporary update of a '70s-style political drama that is even more contemporary than anticipated" and is compared with paranoia infused films of that era including The Conversation (1974), Chinatown (1974), The Parallax View (1974) and Three Days of the Condor (1975). Although the review describes some aspects of the plot as "comically tangled", it concludes that the "filmmaking itself is more grounded" and that the ending contains a "sliver of hope".

== Viewership ==
According to data from Showlabs, Zero Day ranked second on Netflix in the United States for two consecutive weeks, covering 17–23 February and 24 February – 2 March 2025.

== Notes ==
- The song "Who Killed Bambi?" was recorded by Edward Tudor-Pole (Tenpole Tudor) and the Sex Pistols, it was featured on the album The Great Rock 'N' Roll Swindle.
