= True Story (miniseries) =

- Promotional poster
- Genre: Crime thriller; Drama
- Created by: Eric Newman
- Directed by: Stephen Williams; Hanelle Culpepper
- Starring: Kevin Hart; Wesley Snipes; Tawny Newsome; Paul Adelstein; Will Catlett; Chris Diamantopoulos; Billy Zane; Lauren London; Ash Santos; John Ales; Theo Rossi
- Original language: English
- No. of episodes: 7

Production
- Executive producers: Eric Newman; Kevin Hart; Charles Murray; Dave Becky; Stephen Williams
- Editors: Geofrey Hildrew; Iain Erskine; Tamar Federknopp
- Running time: 27–58 minutes
- Production companies: Hartbeat Productions; Grand Electric

Original release
- Network: Netflix
- Release: November 24, 2021

True Story is an American drama television limited series created by Eric Newman for Netflix. The series premiered on November 24, 2021, and consists of seven episodes.

== Premise ==
A tour stop in Philadelphia becomes a matter of life and death for famous comedians.

== Cast and characters ==
- Kevin Hart as Kid, a famous comedian and rising screen actor
- Wesley Snipes as Carlton, Kid's older brother and a failed entrepreneur
- Tawny Newsome as Billie
- Paul Adelstein as Todd
- Will Catlett as Herschel
- Chris Diamantopoulos as Savvas
- Billy Zane as Ari
- Lauren London as Monyca
- Ash Santos as Daphne
- John Ales as Nikos
- Theo Rossi as Gene, a deeply devoted superfan of Kid

Additionally, Chris Hemsworth and Ellen DeGeneres make cameo appearances as themselves.

== Episodes ==
No.	Title	Directed by	Written by	Original release date
1	"Chapter 1: The King of Comedy"	Stephen Williams	Eric Newman	November 24, 2021
2	"Chapter 2: Greek Takeout"	Stephen Williams	Gladys Rodriguez	November 24, 2021
3	"Chapter 3: Victory Lap"	Stephen Williams	Glenda L. Richardson & Matthew Kellard	November 24, 2021
4	"Chapter 4: We Should Be Together Too"	Hanelle Culpepper	Devon Shepard & Cameron Litvack	November 24, 2021
5	"Chapter 5: Hard Feelings"	Hanelle Culpepper	JaNeika James & JaSheika James	November 24, 2021
6	"Chapter 6: The Things You Do for Family"	Hanelle Culpepper	Devon Shepard	November 24, 2021
7	"Chapter 7: ...Like Cain Did Abel"	Hanelle Culpepper	Cameron Litvack	November 24, 2021

== Production ==
=== Development ===
On December 9, 2020, it was announced that Kevin Hart and Wesley Snipes would star in the limited series True Story. The series is created and executive produced by Eric Newman. The series is the television drama debut for Hart, who also executive produces, along with showrunner Charles Murray, director Stephen Williams, and Dave Becky. Hartbeat Productions and Grand Electric produce the series. Caroline Currier, Mike Stein, and Tiffany Brown serve as co-producers.

=== Casting ===
Alongside the series announcement, Hart and Snipes were cast. In February 2021, Tawny Newsome, Paul Adelstein, Will Catlett, Chris Diamantopoulos, Billy Zane, Lauren London, Ash Santos, and John Ales were cast. Theo Rossi was cast a month later.

== Reception ==
The review aggregator website Rotten Tomatoes reported a 57% approval rating with an average rating of 5.9/10, based on 20 critic reviews. The website's critics consensus reads, "Kevin Hart and Wesley Snipes make for a compelling duo, but True Story muffles their chemistry with a dawdling, unmemorable plot." Metacritic gave the series a weighted average score of 54 out of 100 based on 11 critics, indicating "mixed or average reviews".
