= Illicit (2017 film) =

Thriller film by Corey Grant

- Directed by: Corey Grant
- Written by: Corey Grant; Lanett Tachel
- Produced by: Kevin Fleming; McKinley Freeman; Corey Grant; Lanett Tachel; David Ramsey
- Starring: David Ramsey; Shireen Crutchfield; Michele Weaver; McKinley Freeman; Essence Atkins; Lanett Tachel; Dionne Gipson; Michael Monks; Dean Cain; Vivica A. Fox
- Cinematography: Clint Childers
- Edited by: Corey Grant
- Music by: David S. Bateman
- Production company: New Breed Entertainment
- Distributed by: Breaking Glass Pictures
- Release date: June 6, 2017; May 1, 2020 (United States)
- Running time: 109 minutes
- Country: United States
- Language: English

Illicit is a 2017 American thriller film written and directed by Corey Grant. The film stars David Ramsey and Shireen Crutchfield as a married couple while they are having marital issues. Michele Weaver, McKinley Freeman, Essence Atkins, Lanett Tachel, Dionne Gipson, Michael Monks, Dean Cain and Vivica A. Fox also star.

The film premiered at the American Black Film Festival and later screened at the Pan African Film Festival and Toronto Black Film Festival. It was released in selected theatres and video on demand on June 6, 2017, by Breaking Glass Pictures.

== Cast ==
- David Ramsey as Guy Curtis
- Shireen Crutchfield as Sasha Curtis
- Michele Weaver as Faren
- Vivica A. Fox as Linda Steele
- McKinley Freeman as Lance
- Essence Atkins as Nadine
- Lanett Tachel as Tai
- Dionne Gipson as Elaine
- Michael Monks as Kevin
- Dean Cain as Felipe
- Adam Senn as Todd
- Tank as Perry

== Reception ==
The film received mostly negative reviews from critics. Film critic Richard Roeper of Chicago Sun-Times wrote in his review: "Almost nothing about “Illicit” rings true — but thanks to the likable, earnest and attractive cast, and the semi-salacious, soap-opera vibe to the proceedings, my attention never wandered, and I'll admit I was mildly curious about how everything would play out." Joe Leydon from Variety also gave it a negative review, writing:

Directing from a script he co-wrote with Lanett Tachel — who shamelessly sashays through her clichéd role as Sasha’s sassy and curvy BFF — Grant doesn’t do himself any favors by needlessly protracting scenes that need far more snap to be at all effective... “Illicit” is too tepid to qualify as an erotic thriller, or even a guilty pleasure, and the performances range from over the top to tiresomely obvious. To be fair, however, it should be noted that there is at least one genuinely surprisingly twist at the very end."

Carla Renata from The Curvy Film Critic compared Illicit with classic thrillers Fatal Attraction and Double Jeopardy, and Obsessed and praised Michele Weaver's performance as Faren.
