= The Good Girls (group) =

American contemporary R&B group

- Origin: Los Angeles, California
- Genres: R&B, new jack swing
- Years active: 1989–1993, 2018–present
- Label: Motown
- Members: Joyce Tolbert; DeMonica Santiago; Fawn Reed
- Past members: Shireen Crutchfield

The Good Girls are a female R&B trio from Los Angeles, California, that emerged in the late 1980s, originally composed of Shireen Crutchfield, Joyce Tolbert, and DeMonica Santiago.

== Career ==
The Good Girls were recording artists for Motown Records, and were groomed as a contemporary version of The Supremes with a more urban sound. The group's debut album All for Your Love, influenced heavily by Teddy Riley's new jack swing movement, was released in 1989, producing the hit single "Your Sweetness" which peaked at No. 6 on Billboard's Hot R&B/Hip-Hop Songs chart. Other notable singles included their cover version of "Love Is Like an Itching in My Heart," and "I Need Your Love". The girls also appeared on the 1990 debut single by MC Trouble entitled "(I Wanna) Make You Mine". The group's second album Just Call Me was released in 1992 with lukewarm success. Two highlights for the group happened in 1990 when they went on Motown's MotorTown Tour and later that year, they joined New Kids on the Block's No More Games tour.

Group member DeMonica Santiago was married to actor Glenn Plummer, but is now divorced.

In 2018, The Good Girls reunited for a private performance and announced they were returning with new music. In March 2019, it was announced lead singer Shireen Crutchfield had decided to not continue with the reunion in favor of continuing her acting and modeling career and has been replaced by fellow actress-singer and high school friend Fawn Reed.

== Discography ==
=== Albums ===
- 1989: All for Your Love (Motown) - R&B #32
- 1992: Just Call Me (Motown)

=== Singles ===
- 1989: "Your Sweetness" - R&B #6
- 1989: "Love Is Like an Itching in My Heart" - R&B #10
- 1990: "I Need Your Love" - R&B #59
- 1992: "Just Call Me" - R&B #41, UK #75
- 1993: "It Must Be Love" - R&B #47
