= Eric Newman (producer) =

American film producer (born 1970)

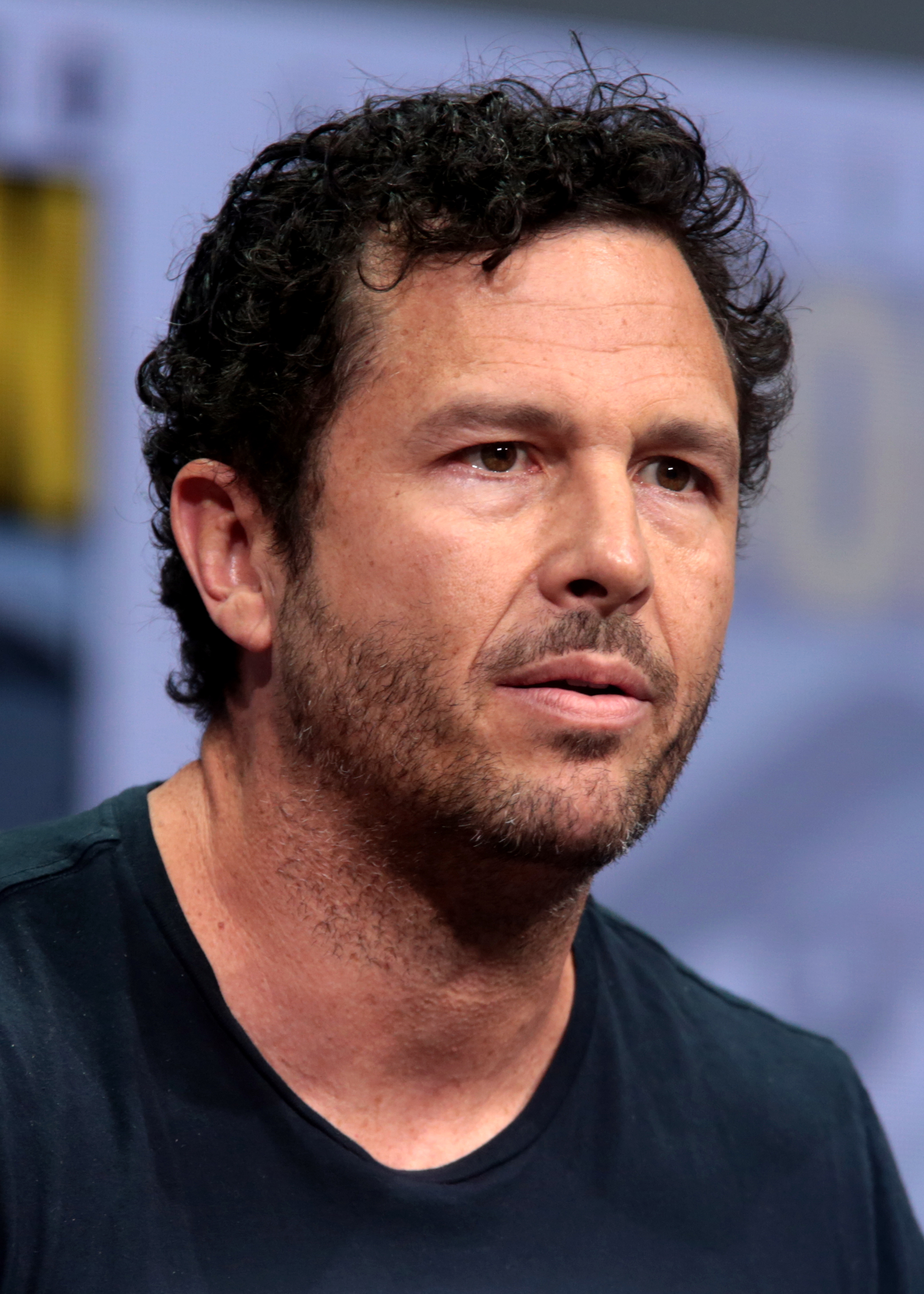
- Newman at the 2017 San Diego Comic-Con
- Born: Eric Newman; December 31, 1970 (age 55); Los Angeles, California, U.S.
- Occupations: Producer; writer
- Years active: 1993–present
- Children: 3
- Father: Randy Newman

Eric Newman (born December 31, 1970) is an American film and television producer and writer and the founder of Grand Electric, an LA-based production company with overall deals in both TV and film with Netflix. He is the showrunner of Narcos, Narcos: Mexico, True Story, and Zero Day. He is the son of musician Randy Newman.

== Early life ==
Born on December 31, 1970, and raised in Los Angeles, Newman is a graduate of Curtis School, Harvard Boys School (Now Harvard-Westlake School), and the University of Southern California's School of Cinema-Television (now known as the USC School of Cinematic Arts). He is the son of multiple Academy Award, Emmy, and Grammy-winning composer and songwriter Randy Newman and his first wife, Roswitha Schmale (1944–2017). He is the cousin once removed of composers David Newman and Thomas Newman and the great-nephew of Academy Award winning composers Lionel Newman, Emil Newman, and Alfred Newman.

== Career ==
He first worked as an intern and assistant for the television sketch comedy show Saturday Night Live (SNL) from 1993-1995 before segueing into a job with SNL creator and producer Lorne Michaels' Broadway Video as a production executive. There Newman helped oversee the 1995 Chris Farley/David Spade film, Tommy Boy as well as their 1996 reteaming, Black Sheep.

Newman joined Beacon Communications (now known as Beacon Pictures) in 1999 as a development and production executive. During his tenure there the company produced a variety of movies under its production deal with Universal Studios including: The Family Man, Bring It On, 13 Days, The Hurricane, and 2001’s Tony Scott directed Spy Game, starring Brad Pitt and Robert Redford, which Newman helped supervise. He was also executive producer of the 2002 drama The Emperor's Club, starring Kevin Kline and directed by Michael Hoffman.

Newman left Beacon in 2000 to partner with veteran producer and director Marc Abraham and producer Thomas A. Bliss to form Strike Entertainment.

In 2001, Newman secured the rights to remake George A. Romero's classic Dawn of the Dead and recruited his friend James Gunn to write it. Soon after he drafted first-time director Zack Snyder to direct it. The 2004 Dawn of the Dead had a modest budget of $26 million, and was a huge success with audiences when it was released in 2004, reaping over $100 million worldwide.

Newman's success in the horror genre continued with James Gunn’s directorial debut film, Slither in 2006. Also produced by Newman in 2006 was Alfonso Cuaron’s Children of Men. Children of Men drew critical acclaim, ultimately being nominated for three Academy Awards. In a partnership with Eli Roth and Studio Canal, Newman conceived of and produced 2010’s The Last Exorcism, made for a budget of $1.6 million dollars, the Lionsgate released film went on to gross over $70 million with a $20 million opening weekend. Remakes of The Thing (2011) and Robocop (2014) followed. Newman also is known for producing the hit film, In Time (2011), and the RZA’s directorial debut, The Man with the Iron Fists (2012).

Newman’s first foray into TV came when he came across Brian McGreevy’s gothic horror novel, Hemlock Grove. He thought it could make a good TV show and brought in his friend and past collaborator Eli Roth to executive produce and direct the pilot. The pair, along with Brian McGreevy and his writing partner Lee Shipman, brought the show to Netflix and it became the then nascent streamer's second original program, running for three seasons from 2012–2015.

In 2014, Newman formed Grand Electric and moved forward with a long gestating idea of his about a film set during the drug war in Colombia. Newman had become interested in America’s efforts to bring Pablo Escobar to justice in 1997 after hearing a story about the aftermath of Escobar’s death and the power vacuum it created. Newman enlisted screenwriters Carlo Bernard and Doug Miro to write a film script based on this idea. During production of season two of Hemlock Grove, Newman learned that Netflix intended to expand into Latin America and were actively looking for projects with South American appeal. Newman repurposed the yet unwritten film project into a 10 part television show and brought Brazilian director José Padilha aboard to executive produce and direct. The team secured a straight-to-series commitment from Netflix and began production in Colombia that same summer. Chris Brancato joined the show as showrunner but departed the show before the season wrapped production. The show debuted in 2015 to almost universal acclaim, BAFTA and Golden Globe nominations for best show, as well as a massive global viewership for the service. Its success secured a two season renewal which saw Newman take over as writing showrunner. He continued in that role through two more seasons of Narcos before transitioning the show to Mexico for a second installment of the franchise. Narcos: Mexico also received acclaim and large viewership and Newman earned a nomination from the Writer’s Guild for his writing on the show. Two seasons into Narcos: Mexico, Newman stepped out of the day-to-day role of show-running to focus on his expanding slate of projects under his Netflix deal.

Newman also produced for Netflix the Will Smith/Joel Edgerton starrer Bright (2017), the Jamie Foxx/Joseph Gordon Levitt actioner Project Power (2020), the Chris Hemsworth/Miles Teller sci-fi feature Spiderhead (2022), and the opioid epidemic limited series, Painkiller (2023), directed by Peter Berg. Newman also created the Kevin Hart/Wesley Snipes series True Story (2021) and co-created the Sofía Vergara miniseries Griselda, based on the life of notorious cocaine trafficker Griselda Blanco. Newman also produced Rebel Moon (2023/2024), a two-part space opera film directed by Zack Snyder.

In 2023, Netflix announced that Newman will co-create and executive produce Zero Day, a political thriller miniseries set to feature Robert De Niro in his first leading television role, alongside Angela Bassett, Lizzy Caplan, Jesse Plemons, and Connie Britton. Newman will also executive produce American Primeval, an upcoming Western limited series directed by Peter Berg and starring Taylor Kitsch and Betty Gilpin.

== Personal life ==
Newman lives in Los Angeles with his wife and three children.

== Filmography ==
He was a producer in all films unless otherwise noted.

=== Film ===
Year	Film	Credit
1996	Black Sheep	Associate producer
2002	The Emperor's Club	Executive producer
2004	Dawn of the Dead	
2006	Slither	
2006	Children of Men	
2008	Flash of Genius	Executive producer
2010	The Last Exorcism	
2011	The Thing	
2011	In Time	
2012	The Man with the Iron Fists	
2013	The Last Exorcism Part II	
2013	The Sacrament	Executive producer
2014	RoboCop	
2017	Bright	
2020	Project Power	
2022	Along for the Ride	
2022	Spiderhead	
2022	Look Both Ways	
2023	Rebel Moon – Part One: A Child of Fire	
2024	Rebel Moon – Part Two: The Scargiver	
TBA	Fight for '84	

Miscellaneous crew

Year	Film	Role
1992	Wayne's World	Production assistant
1995	Tommy Boy	Production associate

=== Television ===
Year	Title	Credit
2013−15	Hemlock Grove	Executive producer
2015−17	Narcos	Executive producer
2018−21	Narcos: Mexico	Executive producer
2021	True Story	Executive producer
2022-present	The Watcher	Executive producer
2023	Painkiller	Executive producer
2024	Griselda	Executive producer
2025	American Primeval	Executive producer
2025	Zero Day	Executive producer

As writer

Year	Title
1994	NYPD Blue
2017	Narcos
2018−20	Narcos: Mexico
2021	True Story
2024	Griselda
2025	Zero Day
