= Constellation (TV series) =

Science fiction thriller television series

- Promotional poster
- Genre: Science fiction Psychological thriller
- Created by: Peter Harness
- Based on: concept by Sean Jablonski
- Written by: Peter Harness
- Starring: Noomi Rapace; Jonathan Banks; James D'Arcy; Rosie Coleman; Davina Coleman; William Catlett; Julian Looman; Barbara Sukowa; Lenn Kudrjawizki; Henry David; Sandra Teles; Carole Weyers
- Opening theme: "Tellur" by Surrogate Sibling
- Composers: Ben Salisbury; Suvi-Eeva Aikas
- Countries of origin: France; United Kingdom; United States
- Original languages: English; Swedish; Russian
- No. of seasons: 1
- No. of episodes: 8

Production
- Executive producers: Simon Arnal; Caroline Benjo; Peter Harness; Rebecca Hobbs; Michelle MacLaren; Tracey Scoffield; Carole Scotta; David Tanner; Justin Thomson
- Running time: 50–58 minutes
- Production companies: Turbine Studios; Haut et Court TV; Haunted Barn; MacLaren Entertainment

Original release
- Network: Apple TV+
- Release: 21 February – 27 March 2024

Constellation is a science fiction psychological thriller television series created by Peter Harness, based on a concept by Sean Jablonski. The first season was released on 21 February 2024, beginning with the initial three episodes. It stars Noomi Rapace, Jonathan Banks, James D'Arcy, Julian Looman, Henry David, William Catlett, and Barbara Sukowa. In May 2024, the series was canceled after one season.

== Plot ==
An unidentified object collides with the International Space Station, leading to the death of one of the five astronauts aboard and crippling most of the onboard systems and one of the Soyuz descent modules. Three of the surviving astronauts make an emergency evacuation in the functional Soyuz module, leaving behind Swedish astronaut Johanna "Jo" Ericsson of the European Space Agency to repair the other Soyuz. When she returns to Earth with the body of her dead crewmate, she finds that parts of her life are missing or not as she remembers them.

== Cast ==
=== Main ===
- Noomi Rapace as Johanna "Jo" Ericsson
- Jonathan Banks as Henry Caldera and Bud Caldera
- James D'Arcy as Magnus Taylor
- Davina Coleman and Rosie Coleman as Alice Ericsson-Taylor
- Julian Looman as Frederic Duverger
- Lenn Kudrjawizki as Sergei Vassiliev
- Henry David as Ilya Andreev
- William Catlett as Paul Lancaster
- Barbara Sukowa as Irena Valentina "Valya" Lysenko
- Sandra Teles as Yazmina Suri
- Carole Weyers as Audrey Brostin

=== Recurring ===
- Rebecca Scroggs as Erica Lancaster and Frida Lancaster
- Joshua Spriggs as James Wallace
- Michel Diercks as Jimmy
- Clare-Hope Ashitey as Agent Bright
- Chipo Chung as Michaela Moyone
- Sadie Sweet as Wendy Lancaster
- Shaun Dingwall as Ian Rogers
- Elenor Fanyinka as Eryn Lafferty

== Episodes ==
No.	Title	Directed by	Written by	Original release date
1	"The Wounded Angel"	Michelle MacLaren	Peter Harness	21 February 2024
As NASA astronaut Paul starts an experiment with the CAL, an object hits the ISS, damaging it. Paul is injured and dies. The object that hit them is a desiccated female corpse in a USSR space suit. Three of the remaining four crew members board the docked three-seat Soyuz MS spacecraft that is undamaged and return to Earth, while Swedish ESA astronaut Jo Ericsson remains to repair and then take the other docked Soyuz MS. On Earth, NASA's experiment leader Henry Caldera insists that Jo bring back the CAL data core, which Roscosmos' flight leader Irena Lysenko allows after being disturbed by Jo's drawing of the USSR corpse. While alone on the ISS, Jo sees a clock speed up, and has a vision of a cupboard with her daughter Alice's necklace on it. Alice and Jo's husband Magnus are flown from their home near the ESA Centre in Cologne, Germany to the Roscosmos cosmodrome in Baikonur, Kazakhstan, to await updates. One night five weeks later, Jo drives through a snowy northern Sweden and takes Alice and the data core to an isolated cabin. After Alice falls asleep, Jo hears her voice calling from outside, follows it to an identical but dilapidated cabin, and finds a sickly Alice hiding in a cupboard.
2	"Live and Let Die"	Michelle MacLaren	Peter Harness	21 February 2024
Jo seemingly blacks out and loses hours of time. Having lost contact with TsuP, she completes repairs and calculates deorbit parameters on her own. The strange occurrences continue, and Jo seemingly hallucinates that Paul is still alive. Jo recovers the CAL data core and records a farewell for Magnus and Alice that she leaves behind on the ISS. As Jo is inside the Soyuz MS and prepares to detach it from the space station, a complication arises that can only be fixed from outside the Soyuz, but the error is mysteriously fixed and Jo sees a shadowy figure watching her from the receding ISS. Jo lands safely and is reunited with her family, but Alice and Magnus are confused when she speaks to them in Swedish. In the flashforward, Jo recognizes the second Alice as "hers"; this Alice asks Jo if she is a ghost. Jo brings second Alice back to her cabin, but she disappears, leaving the other Alice that Jo does not recognize.
3	"Somewhere in Space Hangs My Heart"	Oliver Hirschbiegel	Peter Harness	21 February 2024
Jo notices that some of her memories do not match with those around her. No one believes her claim about the USSR corpse, since no cosmonaut has ever died in space; Irena suggests that Jo had a hypoxia-induced hallucination. Jo is given medication she is told are vitamins; Irena and Henry also take them. When alone, Jo sees the cupboard with Alice's necklace on it. While playing hide-and-seek, Alice sees someone stamp on her toy rabbit. The CAL data core only replicates the effect seen on the ISS when Henry is alone; he theorizes this is due to the observer effect. Jo identifies the USSR suit she saw as the same type Irena wore in the 1960s, but she withdraws her claim after she sees Paul at his own memorial. Elsewhere, former astronaut Bud Caldera, who flew on Apollo 18 when two people died, is at a cruise ship convention where he is questioned by author Ian Rogers for inaccuracies in his memoir. Bud blames the Apollo 18 disaster on "Henry" and, in a drunken rage, throws Ian overboard. In the flashforward, Jo takes Alice in search of the other cabin, and confirms Alice's suspicion that she is not her mother.
4	"The Left Hand of God"	Oliver Hirschbiegel	Peter Harness	28 February 2024
Jo is increasingly disturbed by differences between her memories and the world around her, including the revelation that she has been having an affair with Frederic, head of ESA. Henry takes the CAL data core to ESA, where Jo has visions when it is active. Henry theorizes that the CAL may have opened a pathway to another universe. Jo realizes that the "vitamin" given to her is lithium, which was also secretly given to a handful of other astronauts who displayed erratic behavior during or after their time in space. Jo briefly slips into another universe where cleaners are emptying her office and cannot see her. Jo receives a package from Skagerrak Marine Observatory containing audio recordings made of Jo in the ISS after she had lost contact with TsuP, and of the accidental death of a female cosmonaut in 1967. Alice panics when she slips into the other universe where a wake is being held for Jo; Alice and her doppelganger look at each other. Jo and Magnus fight, and during the struggle Magnus hits his head in a fall. Ian Rogers' death is investigated by the FBI.
5	"Five Miles Out, the Sound Is Clearest"	Oliver Hirschbiegel	Peter Harness	6 March 2024
Jo calls an ambulance for Magnus and flees with Alice. Alice reveals to Jo that she has been seeing the USSR corpse, which she calls "the Valya". Jo asks Illya to check their vitamins, and Illya learns that certain historical cosmonaut files have been purged. Jo steals the CAL data core and travels with Alice to Skagerrak Marine Observatory. There, they meet Walberg and Laurenz Bang, who have for decades been making amateur radio recordings of astronauts in space, and have recorded audio of astronaut deaths, only for that astronaut to return to Earth safely afterward. These "ghost tapes" become clearer when near the CAL data core. After arriving at the cabin, Jo listens to the recording of her mission where she and Alice had a video chat, and Alice confirms that that Alice is not her. Jo hears her Alice call out to her, while in another universe her Alice searches for Jo in the snowstorm. Henry and Bud are in different universes, but are aware of and have been able to communicate with each other. Henry tells Bud he thinks the CAL made things worse, while Bud is determined to destroy Henry's life.
6	"Paul Is Dead"	Joseph Cedar	Peter Harness	13 March 2024
In another universe, the ISS is hit by debris, and Jo is killed when thrown against the cupola. Paul is the astronaut left behind to fix Soyuz 1, during which he keeps hearing the sound of Jo breathing. Alice, upon being told of Jo's death, hides in a cupboard and has a vision of Jo approaching her. NASA allows Paul to leave Jo's corpse on the ISS. Paul faces a complication with the Soyuz that can only be fixed from the outside, but the error is fixed on its own and he sees a shadowy figure watching him from the ISS. After returning safely, Paul is disturbed by differences between his memories and the world he is in, including how the CAL has never existed. Paul and his family attend the wake at the Ericsson house, where Paul and Alice see the other universe where Jo is alive. Paul finds Bud, who realizes that he is from a universe where Apollo 18 was a success. When Paul presses for answers, Bud loses his temper and shoots him. Alice insists that Magnus take her to the cabin, where Alice sees Jo arrive as well.
7	"Through the Looking Glass"	Joseph Cedar	Peter Harness	20 March 2024
When Jo leaves the cabin to find her Alice the second time, her lamp falls off the table, causing the cabin to catch fire. The two Alices independently find the dilapidated cabin and enter the same cupboard, where they see each other in the mirror and are able to talk through a recording device. The Alices figure out that Jo is in the wrong universe and does not know how to return. Jo finds the cabin with the "wrong" Alice and carries her to safety through the fire. Jo attempts to revive the unconscious Alice, and tells her Alice to return to her father. Henry, Frederic and Magnus arrive at the cabin with the authorities, and Jo is taken away. Henry and Bud switch bodies, allowing Henry to call 911 to save Paul. In the hospital, Alice has a vision where the Valya offers to take her to her mother. Alice wakes up and tells Magnus that they have to get Jo back from Irena.
8	"These Fragments I Have Shored Against My Ruin"	Joseph Cedar	Peter Harness	27 March 2024
Jo is taken to a facility, run by Irena, that treats so-called "astronaut burnout": the madness experienced by astronauts that they have chosen to hide from public knowledge. Illya visits Jo and gives her keys to escape, but she chooses to stay after seeing another patient, whom Irena refers to as the first man in space. Both Alices attempt to explain the situation to their fathers, who do not believe them; but both Alices accept the fates of their respective mothers. Irena advises Jo to let her old life go, and tells her that she is pregnant. Jo tells Magnus that she wants to take the lithium medication and move on, but taking the medication would affect her pregnancy. Bud destroys the CAL, takes over Henry's life, and meets Irena to tell her about the switch. Henry is arrested for Bud's murder of Ian Rogers, and Bud's attempted murder of Paul. Paul wakes up in the hospital. In the ISS, the Jo who smashed her face against the cupola, and was left behind as a corpse, wakes up.

== Hugo Simberg paintings ==
Two paintings by the Finnish symbolist painter Hugo Simberg play a symbolic role in the cabin scenes in the series: The Wounded Angel — also the title of the series’ opening episode — and The Devil by the Pot.

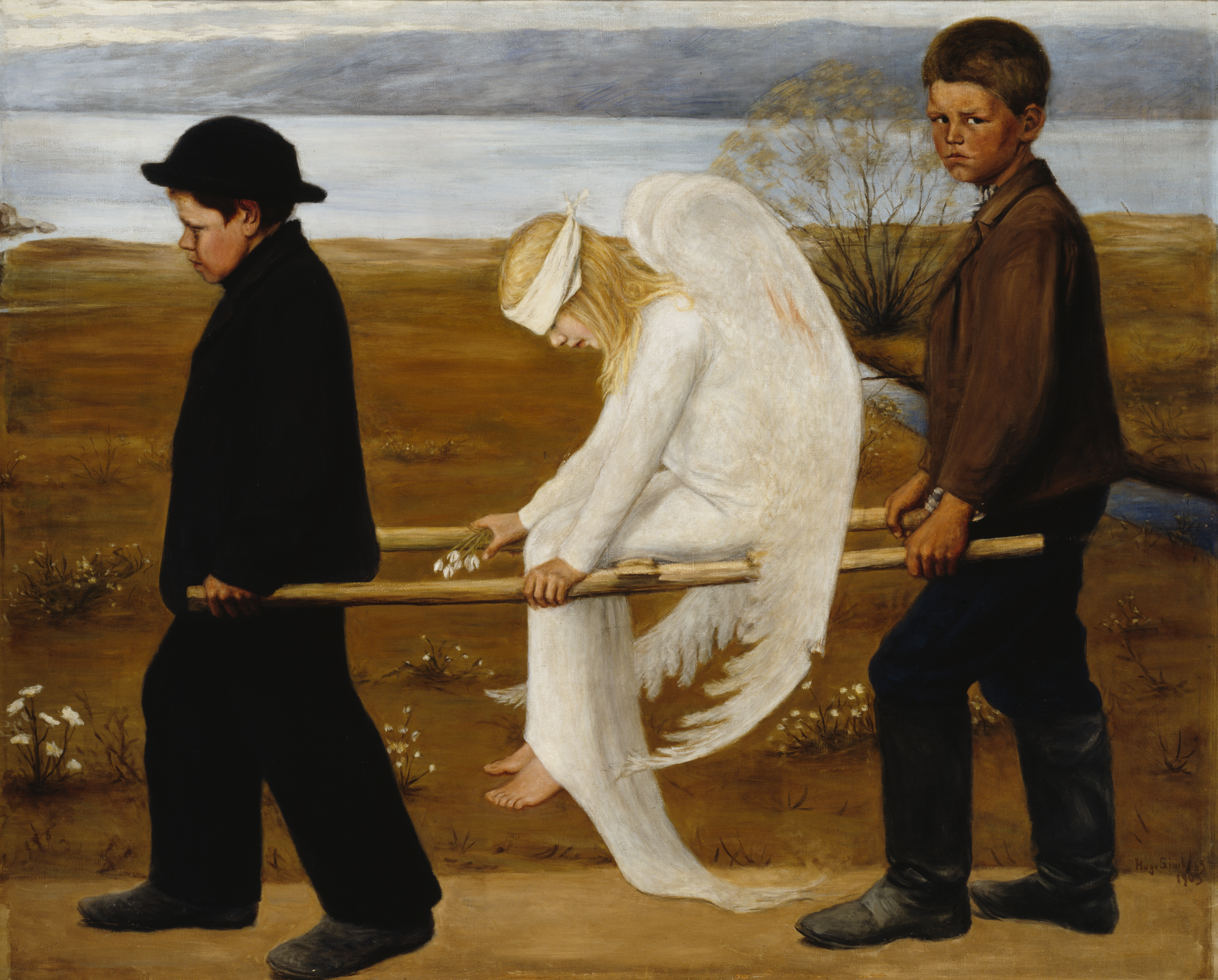
The Wounded Angel (1903)

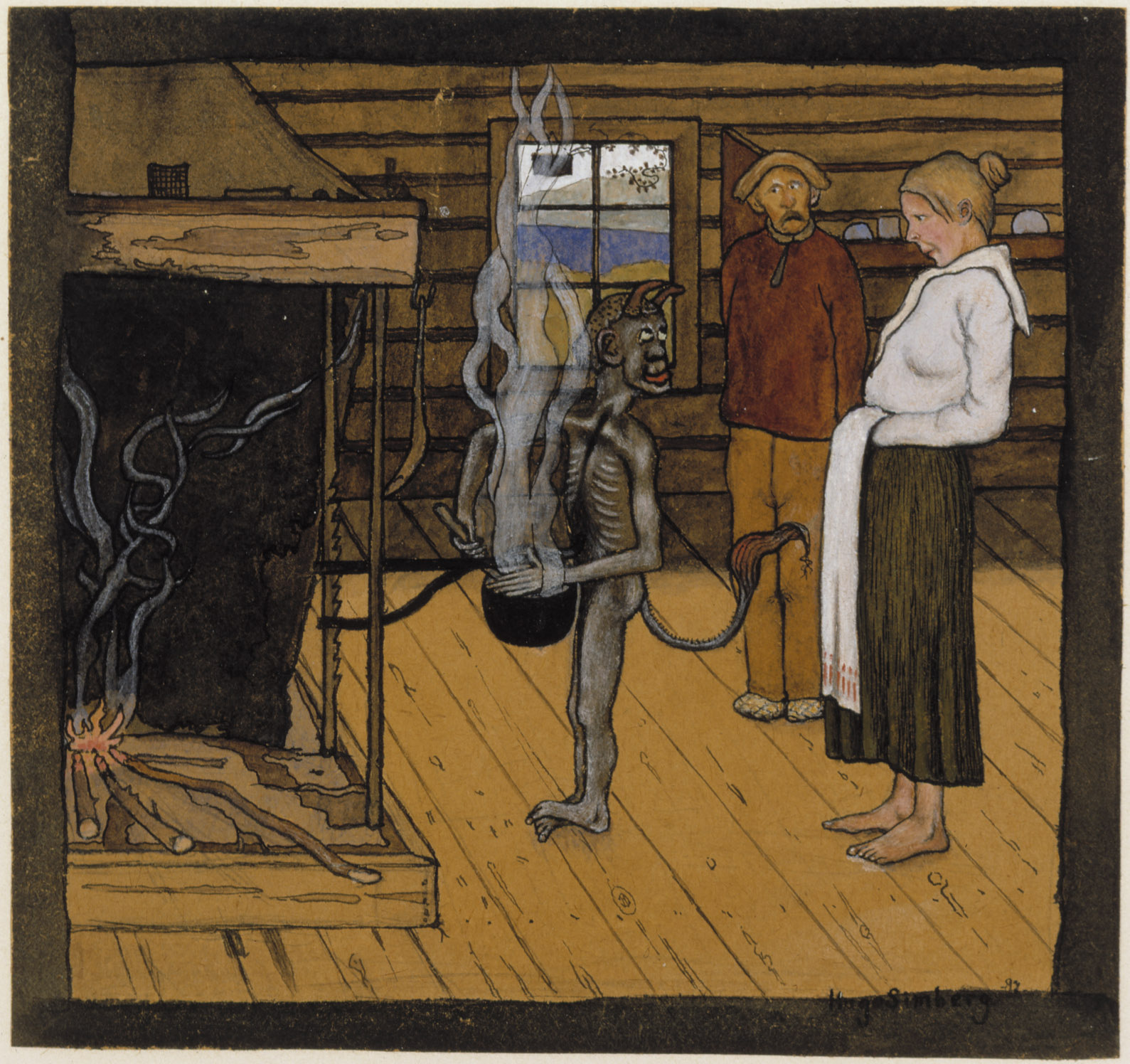
The Devil by the Pot (1897)

Two more paintings also appear: one with the devil being carried and the other with the angel near the fire, showing a crossover of elements between the originals.

== Production ==
It was announced in April 2022 that Apple TV+ had greenlit the series, created by Peter Harness. Noomi Rapace and Jonathan Banks were announced to star with Michelle MacLaren directing. The following month, James D'Arcy joined the cast, and Oliver Hirschbiegel and Joseph Cedar were announced as additional directors of episodes. Writer Robert Shearman was a story consultant on the show.

The production received a record €10 million grant from the German government's German Motion Picture Fund (GMPF), and €1.5 million in production incentives by Business Finland.

Filming began in July 2022 and concluded in February 2023. Production took place in the German federal states of Bavaria, Berlin, Brandenburg and North Rhine-Westphalia. The series was partially produced at Babelsberg Studio in Potsdam. Large-scale sets were constructed there, including a realistic replica of the ISS space station, a Soyuz capsule, and various space-themed sets. The film studio served as a production service provider and infrastructure partner. Consequently, both the entrance area of Studio Babelsberg itself and the nearby Film University Babelsberg — including its atriums, corridors and offices — were used to depict the headquarters of the ESA in Cologne. The elaborate interior decorations were installed by the Art Department of Babelsberg Studio. The visible locations also include the open storage facility of the Potsdam Film Museum. Individual scenes were filmed in Teltow. The episode “Valya” was primarily shot on the grounds of the former Beelitz Heilstätten. Additional scenes were filmed in Denmark and Morocco, as well as in the municipality of Inari in northern Finland.

In August 2023, Finnish newspaper Helsingin Sanomat reported that the series's production companies had failed to pay over €1 million for services the film crew had used in Finnish Lapland, including estate companies, catering and casting services, and an electrical contractor. In September 2023, Helsingin Sanomat reported that the production company Turbine Studios had contacted its creditors by email, announcing its intention to pay the unpaid expenses. As the series had its world-wide premiere on 21 February 2024, the Finnish tabloid Ilta-Sanomat confirmed that a solution for the debts had been settled the previous autumn, but contractors were not able to comment on the terms due to a non-disclosure agreement.

The series was cancelled in May 2024.

== Reception ==
On review aggregator Rotten Tomatoes, 71% of 51 reviews are positive. The website's critics consensus reads: "Solid performances and creepy atmosphere help Constellation engage during a first season with some noticeable narrative turbulence along the way."

On Metacritic, the series holds a weighted average score of 63 out of 100, based on 23 critics, indicating "generally favorable reviews".
