= Kara Brock =

American television and film actress

- Born: Kara Denean Brock; March 29, 1974 (age 52); Long Beach, California, United States
- Education: University of Kansas
- Spouse: Joseph Bustos (2004–present)
- Children: 3
- Website: https://web.archive.org/web/20070419104159/http://www.karabrock.com/

Kara Denean Brock (born March 29, 1974) is an American television and film actress best known for her recurring role as Regina Foster, the sorority-sister of Kim Parker (played by Countess Vaughn) in the UPN sitcom The Parkers. She was born in Long Beach, California, but was raised primarily in Kansas City, Missouri. She is the younger sister of TV writer/producer Mara Brock Akil. Brock is a graduate of California State University, Los Angeles, where she earned a bachelor's degree in theater arts.

== Biography ==
=== Early life ===
Brock was raised in Kansas City, Missouri, where she graduated from Raytown South High School.

After high school, she attended the University of Kansas where she pursued a degree in theater arts. In 1994 she moved to Los Angeles to pursue a career in acting, and transferred to California State University, Los Angeles to finish her acting studies.

=== Career ===
She began her acting career in 1996 in the recurring role of "Sara" in the television series Moesha, followed by appearances in the television comedies Sister Sister, Grown Ups, The Jamie Foxx Show and Girlfriends. Brock also appeared in the television drama Party of Five, playing the stripper "Dusty" during its final season. She also appeared in the film Love & Basketball.

Brock was pregnant during the filming of The Parkers series finale, where her character revealed she was expecting, and that the father might have been Freddy (Kel Mitchell). In 2004, Brock appeared in a Nestlé print advertisement while 8 months pregnant with her first child, Nora. Shortly after giving birth, Brock appeared in Crossing Jordan, playing a clerk at a cryobank.

Brock has also appeared in numerous commercials, most notably for the American Cancer Society.

== Personal life ==
Brock has been married to military and technology consultant Joseph Bustos since 2004. The couple met via the online internet dating site, Match.com. They have three children together: Nora Simone, Sofia Gabriella, and Fiona Helena. Kara is also stepmother to Joey, who can be seen in the mixed martial arts action indie film Maximum Cage Fighting.

== Television appearances ==
- Crossing Jordan (2005)
- Girlfriends (2001–2005)
- The Parkers (1999–2004)
- Party of Five (2000)
- Grown Ups (1999)
- The Jamie Foxx Show
- Sister, Sister
- Moesha (1996)

== Film appearances ==
- Love & Basketball (2000)
