= Shireen Crutchfield =

American actress and singer

- Occupations: Actor, singer
- Years active: 1988–present

Shireen Crutchfield is an American actress and singer. best known as the lead singer of the R&B trio The Good Girls from 1989 to the present. Crutchfield is also known for her acting roles as Jace in Dark Angel and Hot Boyz.

== Filmography ==
=== Film ===
Year	Title	Role	Notes
1994	House Party 3	Shireen	
1999	The Breaks	Girl In The Car	
1999	Judgment Day	Rachael Payne	Video
1999	Hot Boyz	LaShawna Ferrell	Video
2002	Love and a Bullet	Hylene	
2017	Illicit	Sasha Curtis	
2019	I Got the Hook-Up 2	Shavon	
2021	In the Company of Assassins	Clarice	
2023	Passionate Betrayals	Joya	
2025	Love and Coffee	Myra	
2025	Disco Beats	Maria	Short

=== Television ===
Year	Title	Role	Notes
1989-93	Soul Train	Herself/Guest	3 episodes
1992	Video Soul	Herself/Guest	Episode: "The Good Girls"
1996	Seinfeld	Model #2	Episode: "The Bizarro Jerry"
1998	3rd Rock from the Sun	Kirsta	Episode: "36! 24! 36! Dick!: Part 1"
1998	Malcolm & Eddie	Mira	Episode: "Kansas City Split"
1998	Love Boat: The Next Wave	Deena	Episode: "All Aboard"
1999	In the House	Carmen	Episode: "Guest Dad" & "Out of the House"
2000	18 Wheels of Justice	Michelle Haybrook	Episode: "The Fire Next Time"
2000	The Jamie Foxx Show	Kimberly	Episode: "Candy Girl"
2001	The Steve Harvey Show	Lela	Episode: "Me, Me and Miss Jones"
2001	Dark Angel	Jace	Episode: "Female Trouble"
2005	Commander in Chief	Staffer #2	Episode: "Pilot"
2007–08	The Bold and the Beautiful	Forrester Model	Regular Cast
2017–22	The Bold and the Beautiful	Sequoya	Regular Cast
2018	NCIS	Jane	Episode: "One Man's Trash"
2018	Hit the Floor	Leah Matthews	Recurring cast: season 4
2019	Jane the Virgin	Mom	Episode: "Chapter Ninety-Five"
2020	9-1-1: Lone Star	Attractive Woman	Episode: "Yee-Haw"
2022	Good Trouble	Debra	Episode: "Pick a Side, Pick a Fight"
2024	NCIS: Origins	Reporter #3	Episode: "Enter Sandman"
2025	Fire	Irene	Main Cast
2025	Mind Your Business	Asia	Episode: "Love Child"
