= McKinley Freeman =

American actor (born 1976)

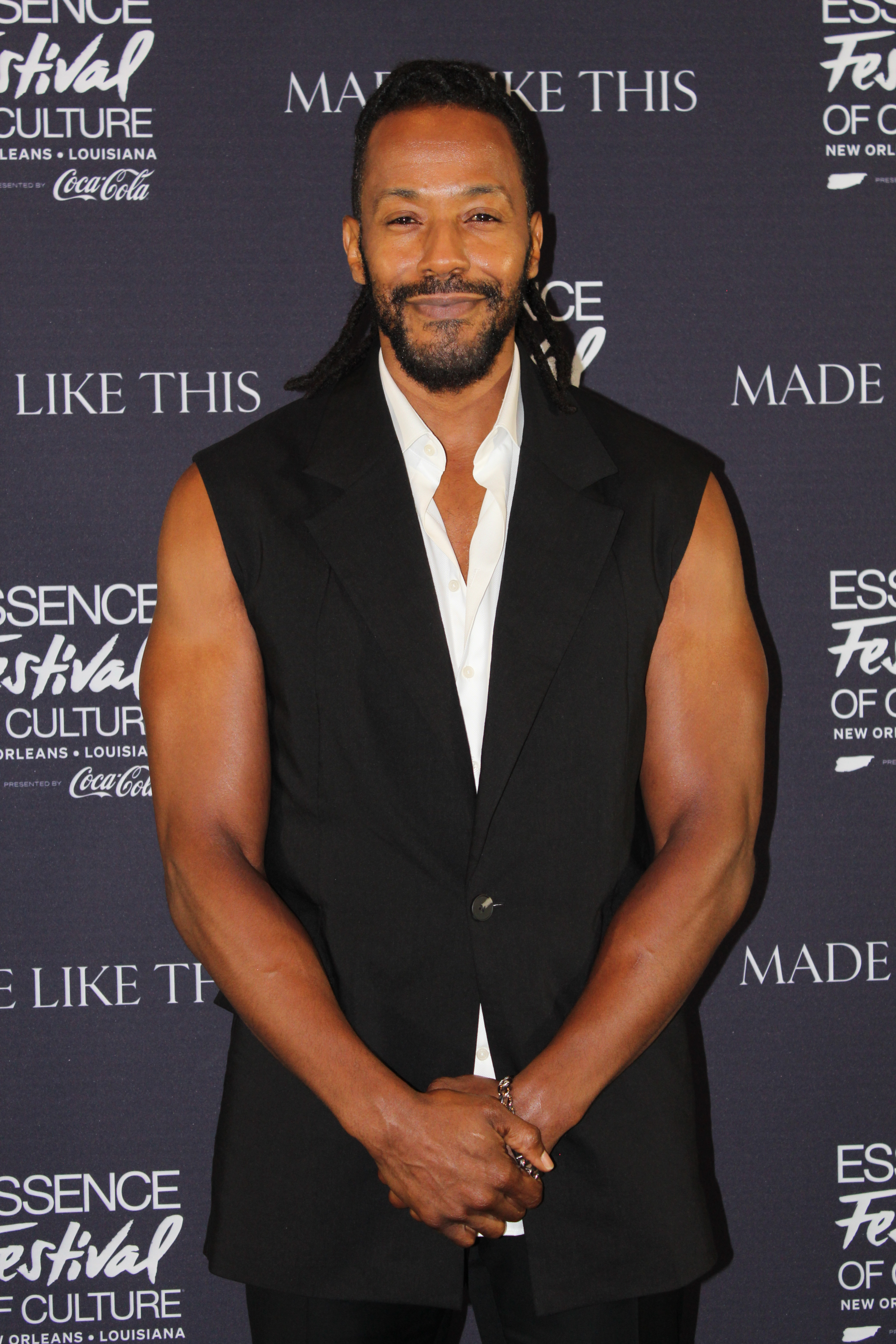
McKinley Freeman at EssenceFest 2025.

McKinley Freeman (born June 9, 1976) is an American actor and producer. He has appeared in films and on television series, including the starring role of Derek Roman in the drama series Hit the Floor, portraying the role of Dominic in the OWN's drama TV series Queen Sugar, and playing the character Lewis in Hulu's Reasonable Doubt.

== Early life ==
Freeman earned a BS in finance at University of Illinois at Champaign-Urbana. In 2004 while working at IBM as a Business Development Manager, he auditioned for All My Children and ended up getting the role.

== Career ==
After working on the soap opera All My Children, he later made appearances on shows such as ER, CSI: Miami, and Criminal Minds. In 2007, he starred as the role Airborne Soldier in the comedy film Delta Farce. In 2009, Freeman became a regular, playing Tony Dane on the ABC's series Samantha Who? Afterwards, he took on some acting roles for a few soap opera series, such as Days of Our Lives, and General Hospital. In 2012, he landed an acting spot on End of Watch. Freeman became a series regular, starring as the character Derek Roman in the drama series Hit the Floor. After three seasons, he left and became a series regular for Daytime Divas and If Loving You Is Wrong.

== Personal life ==
Freeman stays healthy by practicing a variety of forms of boxing, kickboxing and martial arts, such as Bojuka, Jeet Kune Do, and Muay Thai. He also works with the Covenant House and the Boys & Girls Club of America, while focusing on using his basketball skills in order to help children.

== Filmography ==
=== Film ===
Year	Title	Role	Notes	Refs
2004	Pop Rocks	TV Host	TV movie	
2006	McBride: Requiem	Uniformed Officer	TV movie	
2007	Delta Farce	Airborne Soldier		
2007	Sharpshooter	Andre	TV movie	
2008	Good Behavior	Mountain Man	TV movie	
2010	10 Years Later	Darrell Litner		
2011	Hallelujah	Lyndon	TV movie	
2011	Waking Madison	Henry		
2012	Blue-Eyed Butcher	Constable	TV movie	
2012	End of Watch	Williams		
2013	Crosstown	LB		
2013	Jaded the Series	Eric	Video	
2014	A Second Chance Christmas	Malcolm	TV movie	
2016	The Best Thanksgiving Ever	The Hammer		
2017	Hometown Hero	Mitch	TV movie	
2017	Message From a Mistress	Jackson Clinton		
2019	I Got the Hook Up 2	Detective Freeman		
2019	Loved to Death	Jackson		
2019	If Not Now, When?	Jackson		
2020	Illicit	Lance		

=== Television ===
Year	Title	Role	Notes	Refs
2004	All My Children	McKinley Freeman	Episode: "September 16, 2004"	
2005	ER	Flight Medic	Episode: "Here and There"	
2005	CSI: Miami	MDPD Uniform	Episode: "Recoil"	
2005	Over There	MDPD Uniform	Episode: "Roadblock Duty"	
2006	In Justice	Ray Estevez	Episode: "Victims"	
2006	Close to Home	William Harding	Episode: "Still a Small Town"	
2006	Boston Legal	Entertainment Lawyer	Episode: "Spring Fever"	
2007	Criminal Minds	Agent Franks	Episode: "The Big Game"	
2008–11	Days of Our Lives	Evan Sayers	Regular Cast	
2009	Samantha Who?	Tony Dane	Recurring Cast: Season 2	
2009	NCIS	Marine Sergeant Ross Barnes	Episode: "Code of Conduct"	
2009	General Hospital	Det. Roy Williams	Regular Cast	
2010	Look	Zach	Recurring Cast	
2011	The Protector	Patrick 'Trick' Purcell	Episode: "Safe"	
2011	The Closer	Agent Burns	Episode: "Relative Matters"	
2012	The Client List	Client 1	Episode: "Life of Riley"	
2013	Major Crimes	Agent Burns	Episode: "Backfire"	
2013	Bones	Coach Davis McIntyre	Episode: "The Spark in the Park"	
2013–18	Hit the Floor	Derek Roman	Main Cast	
2015	Switched at Birth	Brad Ziff	Episode: "We Mourn, We Weep, We Love Again"	
2015	In-Between	Nick	Recurring Cast	
2016	Relationship Status	Scotty	Recurring Cast	
2017	Scandal	Sean Campbell	Episode: "Head Games"	
2017	Daytime Divas	Shawn Robinson	Main Cast	
2017	If Loving You Is Wrong	Deon	Recurring Cast: Season 2, Guest: Season 3	
2018	9-1-1	Burglar	Episode: "Let Go"	
2019	American Soul	Ike Turner	Episode: "Proceed with Caution"	
2019–2021	Titans	Justin Cole	Guest: Season 2, Recurring Cast: Season 3	
2020	Pump	Jared	Main Cast	
2020	Into the Dark	Nate	Episode: "Good Boy"	
2021–22	Our Kind of People	Nate Robinson	Recurring Cast	
2021–22	Queen Sugar	Dominic Bachard	Recurring Cast: Season 6–7	
2022–present	Reasonable Doubt	Lewis Stewart	Main Cast	

== Awards and nominations ==
Year	Awards	Category	Recipient	Outcome
2013	California Film Awards	Diamond Award - Best Actor	Greencard Warriors	Winner
