= Hot Boyz (film) =

2000 film directed by Master P

- Theatrical release poster
- Directed by: Master P
- Written by: Master P
- Produced by: Richard Pepin; Joseph Merhi
- Starring: Gary Busey; Silkk the Shocker; Jeff Speakman; Snoop Dogg; Master P C. Thomas Howell; Shireen Crutchfield; Pamella D'Pella; C-Murder; Mystikal; Clifton Powell; Anthony Johnson; Dick Anthony Williams; Bernard Lee Bradford; Maurice Lamont; Brent Huff; Casey King
- Cinematography: Ken Blakey; Cheddy D. Hart
- Edited by: Robert Boucher; John Gilbert; David Kern
- Music by: Geoff Levin
- Production company: No Limit Films
- Distributed by: Artisan Entertainment
- Release date: March 21, 2000 (U.S.)
- Running time: 96 minutes
- Country: United States
- Language: English

Hot Boyz is a 2000 American action film written and directed by Master P. With Master P, the film stars Silkk the Shocker, Gary Busey, Jeff Speakman, Clifton Powell, Dick Anthony Williams, Shireen Crutchfield, Anthony Boswell, Mia X, Snoop Dogg, C-Murder and Mystikal. This film was a factor in the rivalry between No Limit and Cash Money as the name "Hot Boys" was already the name of the popular rap group, which consisted of: Lil Wayne, Juvenile, Turk, and B.G.

== Synopsis ==
Kool (Silkk The Shocker) is a good kid from the inner city with ambitions of becoming a successful rap star. He is a black belt in Kenpo karate and is in love with poised and college-bound LaShawna (Shireen Crutchfield). Delores (Pamella D'Pella), Lashawna's mother doesn't approve of their relationship, seeing Kool as trouble for her daughter as Kool fails to convince her to let Lashawna go to Vegas with him, since she'll be departing for college soon. After celebrating his birthday with Lashawna, Tyrel (Mystikal) arrives and informs him of a situation that's arisen with Pee Wee (Anthony Johnson) and rushes him out of the door. Even though Kool is apprehensive about his girlfriend walking home by herself, she tells him to go on ahead.

As she's walking home she witnesses a deal between an undercover cop and an enforcer for Saint (Clifton Powell), a big time drug dealer in the city of Los Angeles. The deal goes bad and the cop gets fatally stabbed. As Lashawna tries to console the dying cop, Officer Mack (Brent Huff), who was hiding behind crates appears and brandishes his weapon, causing Lashawna to run just as help arrives. As she runs all the way home with police in tow, she is then charged with murder. Kool is informed of this by Eddy (Anthony Boswell), a local cop and good friend of everyone in the neighborhood, who's willing to help but can't due to the fact that it isn't his collar. He then informs Kool that he has to talk to Detective Tully (Gary Busey) since it's his collar, and Tully says to make an appointment, which he does.

Tully doesn't care about freeing Lashawna but he does want to bring down Saint's criminal empire, so he sends Kool in undercover, framing him by killing a drug dealer with a gun that has Kool's prints on it. Kool discovers Lashawna's pregnant with his child and he races to put Saint in jail and as he finally gathers enough evidence to release Lashawna and put Saint away, Officer Mack appears and interrogates Lashawna before beating her, mortally wounding her. As Kool arrives to pick her up he's informed about her being moved to the infirmary, as he goes to see her she succumbs to her injuries and dies.

At her funeral, Delores has an outburst towards Kool, blaming him for her daughters death. Officer Mack performs a drive by, and Kool gives chase in a hearse, blowing up his van, killing him. He's then scolded by Tully and his partner Roberts (C. Thomas Howell). During a visit to Lashawna's grave he decides he's had enough, he tells C-Dawg (Snoop Dogg) and Remo (C-Murder) to round up the rest of the gang and to meet him at his house. He then pays a visit to Tully's house to acquire the gun he used to frame him into working for him and steals his entire gun collection.

At Kool's house, he tells the gang the plan and when C-Dawg informs him of an operation they can take over, the Hot Boyz are born and they start taking over every major drug operation in the city, killing all opposition. Kool then takes over Saint's spots. As they're in the club Tyrel informs the group that Saint is set to be released from jail soon as he's just posted bond, suggesting that they need to kill him before he starts a turf war, to which C-Dawg and Remo agree. Kool tells the gang they don't need to worry about it. Pee Wee's greed and asking Kool for more money draws a wedge between him and C-Dawg.

An informant named Moe (Master P) gives information about the organizations of both Saint and Kool, giving him the location of Kool's warehouse. Pee Wee cuts a deal with Saint and leads him to Kool's warehouse. Pee Wee is caught by C-Dawg sniffing cocaine and is brought to Kool, as Kool was informed by C-Dawg of Pee Wee's betrayal to Saint. Kool reaches for his waist, as he does this Pee Wee runs for safety and is fatally shot by C-Dawg. Kool scolds C-Dawg and tells him he had no intention on killing Pee Wee, brandishing a one way plane ticket, saying he was only gonna send him back to his hometown.

Saint and his men arrive at the location and so do Tully, Roberts and LAPD officers and a big shootout ensues, resulting in the deaths of Tyrel (killed by Tully), Detective Roberts and Saint (killed by Kool). C-Dawg is shot unconscious by Saint but regains it long enough to distract Tully into shooting him and is killed after making the sacrifice. Kool takes advantage of this and kills Tully. He then escapes to his car before driving off the docks trying to escape the police, submerging into the water.

Kool is then arrested after being found, and is sentenced to 30 years in prison but due to a legal loophole, only serves 5. Kool returns to Lashawna's gravesite and reflects on all the memories he and Lashawna had, promising to keep her forever in his memory.

== Cast ==
- Silkk the Shocker as "Kool"
- Shireen Crutchfield as LaShawna Ferrell
- Gary Busey as Tully
- Snoop Dogg as Christoper "C-Dawg" Ferrell
- Master P as Moe
- C-Murder as Remo
- Mystikal as Tyrel
- Clifton Powell as Saint
- Anthony Johnson as "Pee Wee"
- Jeff Speakman as Master Keaton
- C. Thomas Howell as Roberts
- Brent Huff as Officer Mack Stevens
- Anthony Boswell as Eddy
- Pamella D'Pella as Delores Ferrell
- Dick Anthony Williams as Harold Ferrell
- Bernard Lee Bradford as J.T.
- Maurice Lamont as Bodyguard
- Brent Huff as Officer Mack
- Casey King as Maklosky
- Mia X as Police Receptionist

== Reception ==
The film received a negative review from Lisa Miller of The Advocate-Messenger.

== See also ==
- List of hood films
