= Love Is (TV series) =

2018 American drama television series

- Genre: Comedy drama
- Created by: Mara Brock Akil; Salim Akil
- Starring: Michele Weaver; Will Catlett; Wendy Davis; Idara Victor; Tyrone Brown; Yootha Wong-Loi-Sing; Kadeem Hardison; Clarke Peters
- Composer: Akira Kosemura
- Country of origin: United States
- Original language: English
- No. of seasons: 1
- No. of episodes: 10

Production
- Executive producers: Mara Brock Akil; Salim Akil
- Running time: 42 minutes
- Production companies: Harpo Films; Akil Productions; Warner Horizon Television

Original release
- Network: Oprah Winfrey Network
- Release: June 19 – August 21, 2018

Love Is (stylized as Love Is ___) is an American drama television series created and produced by Mara Brock Akil and Salim Akil. Based on the Akils’ real-life relationship, the series follows a modern-day power couple in Black Hollywood balancing successful careers and family over three decades. The series premiered on June 19, 2018, on the Oprah Winfrey Network.

On July 31, 2018, it was renewed for a second season, but on December 19, 2018, the series was cancelled by OWN after a woman accused Salim Akil of domestic violence in their alleged extramarital affair and for copyright infringement alleging that her screenplay was used as the basis for the series.

== Plot ==
In 2017, a Black power couple tell the story of how they found love in one another and of their rise to fame in Hollywood starting in the 1990s. When they meet, Nuri is a comedy sitcom staff writer who longs to work in drama and Yasir is an aspiring but out-of-work writer and director.

== Cast and characters ==
=== Main ===
- Michele Weaver as Nuri Summers in the year 1997
- Will Catlett as Yasir Omar in the year 1997
- Wendy Davis as Nuri in the year 2017
- Clarke Peters as Yasir in the year 2017
- Idara Victor as Angela in the year 1997
- Tyrone Brown as Sean in the year 1997
- Yootha Wong-Loi-Sing as Ruby in the year 1997
- Kadeem Hardison as Norman in the year 1997

=== Recurring ===
- Tammy Townsend as Carol, the mother of Nuri
- Loretta Devine as Betty, the mother of Yasir
- Tim Reid as Sean in 2017.
- Vanessa Bell Calloway as Angela in 2017
- Lucius Baston as Lionel Woods
- Tosin Morohunfola as Keith
- Michael King as Will
- Jef Holbrook as the Bookstore Manager
- Robert Crayton as Big Bob

== Episodes ==
No.	Title	Directed by	Written by	Original release date	US viewers (millions)
1	"Nuri and Yasir"	Mara Brock Akil	Mara Brock Akil	June 19, 2018	1.00
2	"First Date"	Robert Townsend	Mara Brock Akil	June 26, 2018	0.976
3	"(Her) Questions"	Tanya Hamilton	Mara Brock Akil	July 3, 2018	0.709
4	"(His) Answers"	Cheryl Dunye	Jerron Horton	July 10, 2018	0.983
5	"Acceptance"	Oz Scott	Michelle Listenbee Brown	July 17, 2018	1.14
6	"Supportive"	Karen Gaviola	Story by : Jerron Horton & Will Catlett; Teleplay by : Jerron Horton	July 24, 2018	0.868
7	"Not Valentine's Day"	Salli Richardson	Mara Brock Akil & Jerron Horton	July 31, 2018	0.614
8	"Rose (Going Home)"	Neema Barnette	Michelle Listenbee Brown	August 7, 2018	0.700
9	"A First Script"	Rachael Holder	Melora Rivera	August 14, 2018	0.980
10	"Love Is Engagement"	Mara Brock Akil	Mara Brock Akil	August 21, 2018	1.06

== Production ==
=== Development ===
The series originated under the title Documenting Love, a multi-camera comedy project at ABC with a pilot production commitment in August, 2016. The project, which did not go to production at ABC network, later was rewritten as a one-hour single-camera dramedy. On July 18, 2017, it was announced that the project, now titled Love Is, was ordered direct-to-series on Oprah Winfrey Network for airing in 2018.

=== Casting ===
On December 6, 2017, it was announced that newcomers Michele Weaver and Will Catlett would star as Nuri, a sitcom staff writer, and Yasir, a writer-director. On January 16, 2018, Idara Victor, Tyrone Brown, Kadeem Hardison, Yootha Wong-Loi-Sing, and Lana Young have been cast as series regulars. On February 15, 2018 Clarke Peters joined the cast as regular. On February 16, 2018, it was announced that Tammy Townsend, Loretta Devine, Tim Reid and Vanessa Bell Calloway were cast for recurring roles on the series.

On April 13, 2018, it was announced that Wendy Davis would replace Lana Young as Nuri in the year 2017.

== Reception ==
=== Critical response ===
On the review aggregator website Rotten Tomatoes, the series has an approval rating of 80% based on 10 reviews, with an average rating of 6.7/10. Metacritic, which uses a weighted average, assigned a score of 66 out of 100 based on 6 critics, indicating "generally favorable reviews".

=== Ratings ===
Viewership and ratings per episode of Love Is
No.	Title	Air date	Rating (18–49)	Viewers (millions)
1	"Nuri and Yasir"	June 19, 2018	0.3	1.00
2	"First Date"	June 26, 2018	0.3	0.976
3	"(Her) Questions"	July 3, 2018	0.2	0.709
4	"(His) Answers"	July 10, 2018	0.3	0.983
5	"Acceptance"	July 17, 2018	0.3	1.14
6	"Supportive"	July 24, 2018	0.2	0.868
7	"Not Valentine's Day"	July 31, 2018	0.2	0.614
8	"Rose"	August 7, 2018	0.2	0.700
9	"A First Script"	August 14, 2018	0.3	0.980
10	"Love Is Engagement"	August 21, 2018	0.3	1.06
