= Pamella D'Pella =

American actress

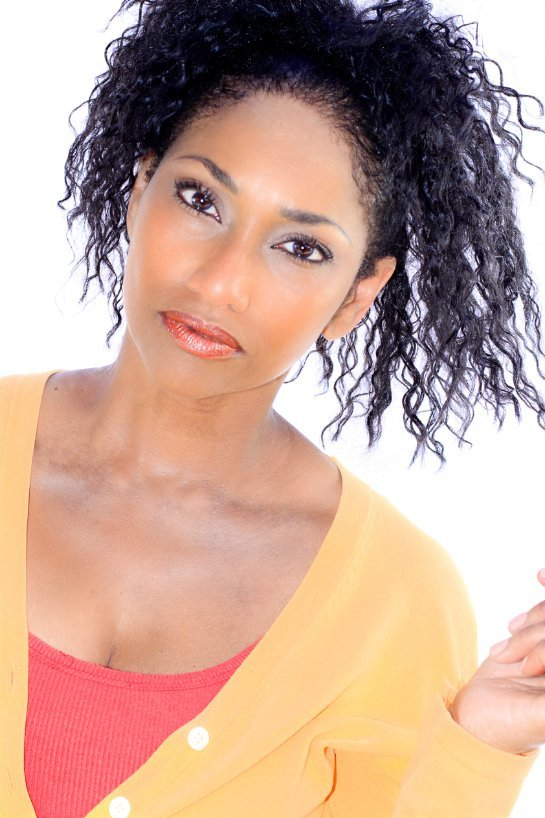
- Born: Pamela Denise Manley; August 22, 1957 (age 68); Chicago, Illinois, U.S.
- Other names: Pamella Manley; Pamella D. Pella; Dangeruz
- Occupation: Actress
- Years active: 1981–present

Pamella D'Pella (born Pamela Denise Manley; August 22, 1957) is an American actress, singer-songwriter, photographer and dancer. Pamella is recognized for her extensive acting career, most notably for her years spent as "Julia" in the long running soap opera The Young and the Restless and as Teresa on The Bold and the Beautiful. She has appeared in numerous other films and television shows such as, Ted and Venus, Hot Boyz, Caged Heat II: Stripped of Freedom, and Diagnosis: Murder. Additionally, D'Pella was one of the founding members of the Location Managers Guild of America and held the office of Vice President .

== Early life ==
Pamella D'Pella was born in Chicago on August 22, 1957 to Mary Ann Manley. After leaving the United States Air Force her mother relocated the family to Cincinnati, Ohio. Her natural passion for dramatic arts and music manifested itself shortly thereafter. At the age of four, D'Pella began singing to family members and neighbors, reenacting scenes from her favorite films, television shows, and various sketches. Throughout her teenage years she continued to explore the full spectrum of her talents, venturing into modeling, cheerleading and athletics. Accolades and awards began to follow her efforts, was crowned Cincinnati's first Miss NAACP at 16 and the youngest in the competition. She additionally won the titles of Miss Aerospace, Miss Hemisphere, and Cincinnati's Junior Miss (now known as Distinguished Young Women). She was the first Black girl to wear the crown for the city. She was recognized by the International Thespian Society for her excellence in movement and characterization, while also winning a Meritorious Award of Achievement for Participation in Theater for her work portraying the "Wicked Witch of the West" in a stage production of The Wizard of Oz.

D'Pella studied theater at Western Kentucky University, and performed in various college productions. After freshman year, she transferred to the University of Cincinnati while simultaneously becoming a professional cheerleader, breaking racial barriers as one of the first Black Cincinnati Ben-Gals cheerleaders for the National Football League's Cincinnati Bengals. She received highly favorable press reviews for her outstanding performance in David Mamet's Sexual Perversity in Chicago and also for her role as the "Dark Queen" in Snow White.

Seeking to further her artistic career, Pamella left Cincinnati to study theater at the American Academy of Dramatic Arts in New York City and studied dance at the acclaimed Dance Theater of Harlem. It was at this time while living at the International House of New York that she became interested in the diversity of religious art from other countries.

After leaving New York City, Pamella went to study Directing and Set Design for her graduate studies in Kentucky at University of Louisville on a costuming fellowship.

== Career ==
Pamella moved to Los Angeles in 1981. Within two weeks of her arrival, she began working on the set of The Young and the Restless, eventually, settling into her role as "Julia", a recurring character that spanned ten years and over 40 episodes. Pamella's early work in Los Angeles consisted of guest star roles in series such as Hunter, O'Hara, and LA Law.

After years of formal training Pamella D'Pella was ordained and licensed at the West Los Angeles' Church of Inner Light. An active participant in entertainment issues, D'Pella was elected as a board member of the Screen Actors Guild after joining that union in 1982, a member of the American Federation of Television and Radio Artists (1981), Actors' Equity Association and served on the Executive Peer Committee of the Academy of Television Arts & Sciences.

== Music ==
Throughout the 1990s, Pamella wrote and recorded several unreleased records with multi-platinum producer Darryl "Dok" Ross. Although the records generated interest from multiple labels, Pamella never pursued a record contract, instead choosing to focus her energies on acting.

In 2012, Pamella recorded and released a post/experimental rock single, White Rabbit and Baby Blue Panties. Rejoining with producer, Dok Ross, the song features lead guitar provided by 513 Elevator's guitarist Jeremy Bartel and "The Zill Master" Tracey Farmer.

== Personal life ==
Pamella lives in Los Angeles, California.

== Filmography ==
=== Film ===
Year	Film	Role	Notes
1989	Love and Betrayal	Lissa	TV movie
1990	Internal Affairs	Cheryl	
1990	Pacific Palisades	Un Mannequin (USA)	
1991	Uncaged	Ros	
1991	Ted & Venus	Gloria	
1992	Illicit Behavior	Marilyn	
1993	Josh and S.A.M.	Daughter on Bus	
1994	Caged Heat II: Stripped of Freedom	Paula	
1996	Alien Nation: Millennium	Officer Shivan	TV movie
1999	Hot Boyz	Delores	Video
1999	Thicker than Water	Mrs. Rivers	
2001	The Heart Department	Tanya Adaire	TV movie
2003	Playas Ball	Kennedy	
2007	Superbad	Teacher	
2012	Who Killed Soul Glow?	-	
2012	Plant Life	Guest Two	Video Short

=== Television ===
Year	Title	Role	Notes
1986	Hunter	Tracy	Episode: "Scrap Metal"
1986	L.A. Law	Mrs. Fields	Episode: "Slum Enchanted Evening"
1987	Ohara	Powell	Episode: "Frannie"
1988	ALF	Denise	Episode: "Movin' Out"
1989	Tales from the Crypt	Raven	Episode: "Only Sin Deep"
1990	Working Girl	Secretary	Episode: "Dream On"
1990-92	The Bold and the Beautiful	Teresa	Regular Cast
1991	The Sunday Comics	Herself	Episode: "Santa Ain't Coming"
1993	Bodies of Evidence	Vonda Green	Episode: "Blindside"
1993-2002	The Young and the Restless	Nurse Julia	Regular Cast
1996	High Incident	Candace Collier	Episode: "The Godfather" & "Warrant Peace"
1997	Die Gang	Alice	Episode: "Ein teuflischer Plan"
1997	Crisis Center	Wanda	Episode: "Shots"
2000	Any Day Now	Woman	Episode: "You Think I Am Lying to You?"
2000	Diagnosis Murder	Detective Barbara Quinn	Episode: "Blind Man's Bluff"
