= Ted & Venus =

- Theatrical release poster
- Directed by: Bud Cort
- Screenplay by: Paul Ciotti; Bud Cort
- Story by: Paul Ciotti
- Produced by: William Talmadge; Randolf Turrow; Krishna Shah
- Starring: Bud Cort; James Brolin; Carol Kane; Martin Mull; Rhea Perlman; Woody Harrelson
- Cinematography: Dietrich Lohmann
- Edited by: Katina Zinner; Peter Zinner
- Music by: David Robbins
- Production companies: Gondola Film; L.A. Dreams Productions
- Distributed by: Double Helix Films
- Release date: December 20, 1991
- Running time: 100 minutes
- Country: United States
- Language: English

Ted & Venus is a 1991 American black comedy film directed by Bud Cort, written by Cort and Paul Ciotti and featuring an all-star cast. The original music is composed by David Robbins.

The film premiered theatrically in New York City on December 20, 1991, and was later released on home video in 1993. On March 1, 2005, the film was released on DVD in Canada by Legacy Entertainment in full frame format.

== Plot ==
In 1974 Venice Beach, Ted Whitley is a 35-year-old hippie living on disability benefits who spends his time drifting along the boardwalk and reading his beat poetry at a local dive bar. While sitting on a pier one day, he spies a beautiful woman emerging from the sea. He is immediately smitten and learns that the woman is Linda, who happens to manage the agency helping Ted find a new apartment. Ted pursues Linda with his poetic rambles. However, Linda does not reciprocate the romantic feelings of Ted, who misinterprets Linda's friendliness for amorousness. When Linda backs away from Ted, this only exacerbates his obsession with her, causing Linda's formerly friendly demeanor to change. Ted continues to stalk her until tragedy strikes.

== Cast ==
- Bud Cort as Ted Whitley
- James Brolin as Max Waters
- Kim Adams as Linda Turner
- Carol Kane as Colette
- Pamella D'Pella as Gloria
- Brian Thompson as Herb
- Rhea Perlman as Grace
- Woody Harrelson as Homeless Vietnam Veteran
- Martin Mull as Ted's Attorney
- Timothy Leary as Judge William H. Converse
- Tricia O'Neil as Judge Katherine Notch
- Tony Genaro as Bailiff
- Vincent Schiavelli as Publisher
- Andrea Martin as Bag Lady
- Cassandra Peterson as Lisa
- Tracy Reiner as Shelly
- Arleen Sorkin as Marcia
- Pat McCormick as Marcia's Elderly Boyfriend
- Gena Rowlands as Mrs. Turner
- Lily Mariye as Rose
- Bettye Ackerman as Poetry Award Presenter
- Rob Moran as Patient #2
- Zoe R. Cassavetes as Waitress with Attitude
- Joe Paul as Wino
- Tamara De Treaux as Park Bench Lover
- Peter Koch as Cop #1
- Norma Maldonado as Cop #5

== Production ==
Filming took place from July 30 to September 11, 1990.

The film is dedicated to the memory of Ruth Gordon, Hal Ashby and Colin Higgins.

== Reception ==
Variety wrote Cort "attempts to recapture some of the eccentric appeal of his 1971 starrer Harold and Maude but he’s picked the wrong story and treated it far too seriously." Variety conceded that the film accurately captures the look and feel of its 1974 setting.

TV Guide said, "The film's focus is often fuzzy, since it is almost impossible to determine whether Cort meant the film to be a black comedy or a poignant, albeit quirky, morality tale about life and what it could be if only people learned how to communicate their feelings for one another in more clear-cut terms. Whatever Cort's intentions, Ted & Venus begins as a quirky but sweet little movie that turns sour and becomes a downright unpleasant experience long before the ultimately touching climax. To his credit, Cort keeps the story's action moving at a crisp pace and he succeeds in holding audience interest, even as he does everything to turn them off."

A retrospective review from Thepronegunman read, "What makes Ted & Venus interesting is exactly what critics of the film objected to: how it sets up expectations only to completely obliterate them…Cort leads you to believe that [the film] will be a trite and tiresome love-against-all-odds romantic comedy in which opposites attract and two extremely different people fall in love with each other in spite of their differences. A film in which the endless persistence of the lovelorn protagonist who refuses to take no for an answer and pursues his love interest with a single-minded, burning obsession wins the object of his affection’s heart…Instead, Cort savages this premise by depicting this obsessional behavior for what it is: not the signs of an endearing romantic but the actions of a mentally unstable individual."
