= Mara Brock Akil =

American screenwriter and television producer (born 1970)

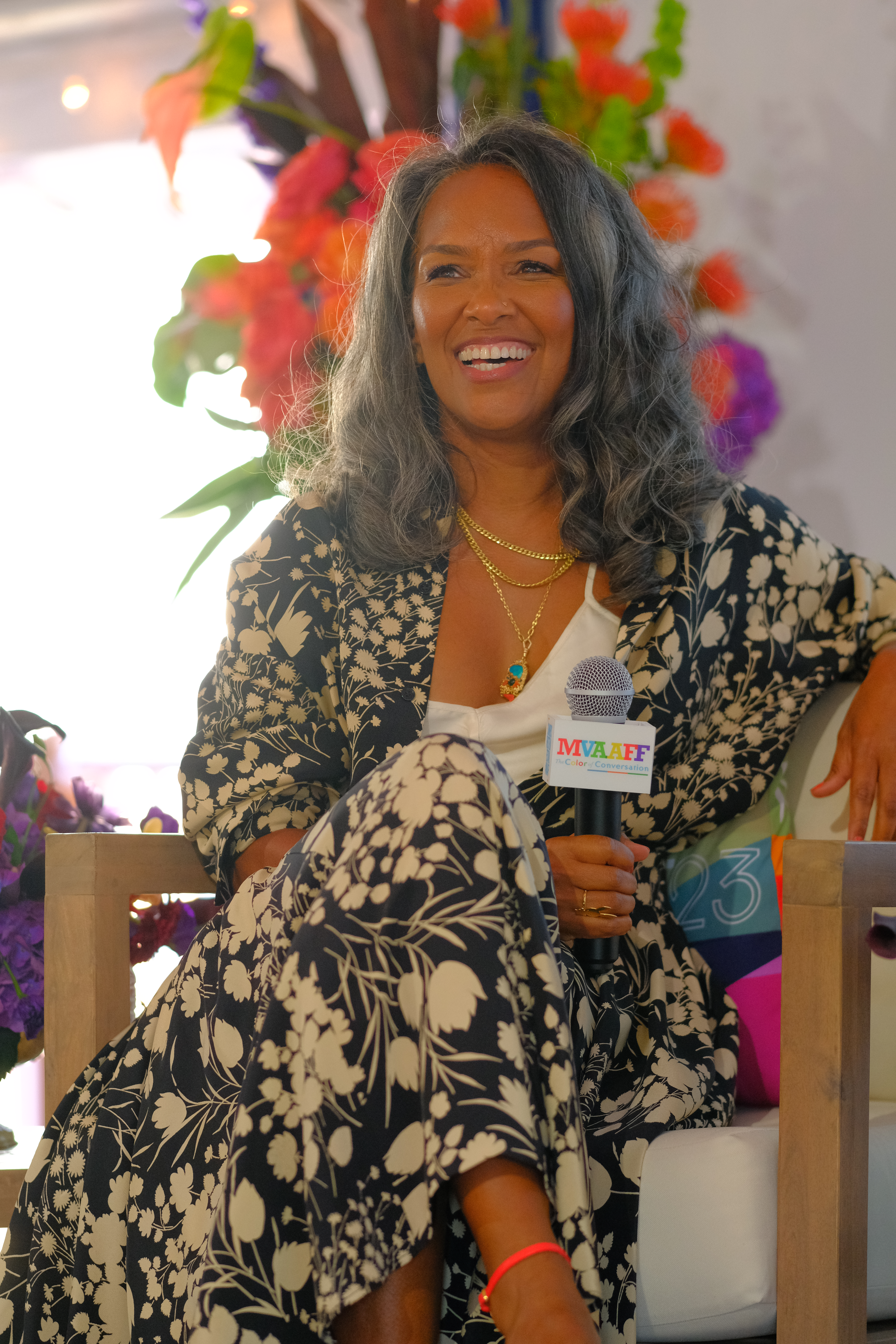
- Brock Akil at MVAAFF in August 2025.
- Born: Mara Brock; May 27, 1970 (age 56); Compton, California, U.S.
- Education: Northwestern University
- Occupations: Screenwriter, producer
- Years active: 1993–present
- Spouse: Salim Akil (m. 1999)
- Children: 2

Mara Brock Akil (born May 27, 1970) is an American television producer and writer. She began her screenwriting career at age 23 on South Central (1994) on Fox. At age 30, she became the youngest African American showrunner on broadcast network television when she created the sitcom Girlfriends, airing on UPN (2000–06) and its successor The CW (2006–08), and is the first African American female showrunner to have two series concurrently on broadcast network TV when she created its spin-off The Game on The CW (2006–09) before its revival on BET (2011–15).

She created Being Mary Jane (2013–19), which was BET's first drama series, and The Game sequel series (2021–22) on Paramount+. She co-created romantic drama Love Is (2018) on OWN and co-executive produced the DC Arrowverse series Black Lightning (2018–21) on The CW with her husband Salim Akil. The duo founded Akil Productions in 2000. She founded Story27 with Netflix in 2021, creating her sixth series with romantic teen drama Forever (2025).

She was a writer and producer on Moesha (1996–99) on UPN, The Jamie Foxx Show (1999–2000) on The WB, Cougar Town (2010) on ABC and theatrical film Sparkle (2012). Brock Akil is the only African American showrunner to have a scripted series on TV every year of the 2000s. Her scripted series were two of only four in 2007 and 2008 and was one of only two in 2009 with a predominantly Black cast on broadcast network TV. (Note: The last two seasons of Girlfriends aired between 2007 and 2008 and the first three seasons of The Game aired between 2007 and 2009 concurrent with the last season of All of Us in 2007, the only season of Under One Roof in 2008, and the last three seasons of Everybody Hates Chris which aired between 2007 and 2009.)

== Early life and education ==
She was born Mara Brock in 1970 in Compton, California, to Joan Carol Fullmore and William Bartido Brock II (later Wali Shamsuddin) who were high school sweethearts. Her brother William "Bill" Brock III was three years old at the time and their younger sister Kara Brock was born four years later. Her paternal grandmother was Candida Brock, and her maternal grandfather was Johnn Fullmore. Her maternal grandmother Hellen Bales Fullmore died in November 2024 at age 102. Mara lived her early childhood in Baldwin Hills in South Central Los Angeles, and lived her preteen and teenage years in and around Kansas City, Missouri, after her parents divorced when she was eight years old in 1977.

Her mother left with the children and moved to the Kansas City metropolitan area where she worked her way up from an entry-level position to a computer programmer at Marion Laboratories while raising Mara and her siblings as a single mother. She was sexually molested between the ages of six and 12 years old. At age 11, Mara saw a 17-year-old Whitney Houston as a cover model on the November 1981 issue of Seventeen magazine, more than three years before she became a popstar. Brock Akil recalled, "When she made it to the cover, I just felt like I made it to the cover" and that it gave her hope that "things are possible." She graduated in 1988 from Raytown South High School where she decided she would pursue a career in writing. She opted against going to the University of Missouri like many of her classmates were and applied to only one college, Northwestern University in Evanston, Illinois in the Chicago metropolitan area, hoping to attend the Medill School of Journalism. She was accepted and went on to join the Delta Sigma Theta sorority.

In her freshmen year, Mara volunteered to help some friends in the campus' Black sketch comedy group Out Da Box. When a member encouraged her to write a sketch, she initially resisted before writing a parody of Mike Tyson and Robin Givens' marriage. "The first laugh was a high I will never forget," she later recounted. She took two courses with professor Njoki McElroy in 'Performance of African-American Literature' that focused on directing and performing. She performed in two theatrical productions for McElroy, including playing the lead in The Colored Museum. She had a college internship at The Grand Rapids Press in Michigan that changed her approach to storytelling; "I was thinking I got this story, and you realized very quickly that your stories did not matter. I remember the amount of hustle it took just to get a couple stories on. So, my senior year I decided 'I'm going to tell the truth through fiction.'"

A friend invited her to an 'Organization of Black Screenwriters' seminar hosted by producer Gus Blackmon. She made her decision to work in the television industry after meeting professor Delle Chatman at the seminar and went on to petition Chatman to get into her screenwriting course. She tried out for the job of an MTV VJ when an open audition was held on campus in February 1991. Mara Brock graduated in 1992 and applied for Hollywood writing apprenticeships but never received any. She turned down an advertising job and worked for a year as an assistant manager at a Gap clothing store before deciding to move to Los Angeles.

== Career ==
=== 1993–2000 ===
In 1993, Mara Brock performed as an actor in a minor speaking role in the feature film With Honors (1994) in a scene shot in Chicago. After moving to Los Angeles, she met NU alumnus and assistant director Jerry Ziesmer who told her to "put my last two films on your résumé." She called Mark Adkins, brother and manager of comedian Sinbad, who she befriended while visiting comedy clubs in Chicago. Adkins had one job opening left and she became a production assistant for $180 a week on The Sinbad Show. The sitcom aired for one season spanning 24 episodes from September 16, 1993 to April 21, 1994 on Fox before being cancelled. In 1994, while working on the show, knowing that its executive producers Ralph Farquhar and Michael J. Weithorn were developing a TV pilot, she began writing scripts she hoped for them to read. Once she got a minute of Farquhar's time, she recalls telling him, "Let me not waste it on why I need you. That's obvious. Let me spend it on why you need me." She was given the position of a WGA Writers' Trainee on the forthcoming series South Central. The comedy drama, centered on divorcee single mother Joan Mosley and her three children, aired for one season spanning 10 episodes from April 5 to June 7, 1994 on Fox.

In 1995, after an 18-month unemployment period and working as a production assistant on CBS sitcom Dave's World, Mara Brock received a call from Farquhar and soon began working on Moesha as a writer on the first four seasons and then also as a producer on the fourth season which ended on August 23, 1999. The sitcom, starring Brandy Norwood, was created by Farquhar, Vida Spears and Sara Finney-Johnson. Moesha aired for six seasons spanning 127 episodes from January 23, 1996 to May 14, 2001, becoming the biggest hit on the fledgling UPN. In a February 2021 interview, Brock Akil recounted her experience working for Farquhar: "I really appreciate the way he ran Moesha and that he gave access to us and taught us how to [...] not just write script, but how do you produce that [...] I wanted to learn from him. He learned from Garry Marshall, and so all that legacy is within me." Brock Akil next worked as a supervising producer and writer on the fourth and fifth seasons of The Jamie Foxx Show where her episodes aired between September 24, 1999 and October 29, 2000. The sitcom co-created by its namesake and Bentley Kyle Evans aired for five seasons spanning 100 episodes from August 28, 1996 to January 14, 2001 on The WB.

=== 2000–2009 ===
In May 2000, Brock Akil created Girlfriends after she went to UPN and sold her idea for the series days before her 30th birthday. She struck a deal with Kelsey Grammer, who became involved after no studio agreed to finance the series and had funds available through his development deal at Paramount Television. The series was produced by his production company, Grammnet Productions. The sitcom chronicling Joan Clayton, played by Tracee Ellis Ross, and her three girlfriends aired for eight seasons. The first six seasons aired on UPN from September 11, 2000 to May 8, 2006. After The WB and UPN merged to become The CW, the last two seasons aired from October 1, 2006 to February 11, 2008. Following the network change when several other shows were cancelled, Brock Akil complained about the lack of marketing around her shows by The CW.

She also created and executive produced a spin-off to Girlfriends, The Game, along with her husband Salim Akil. In 2009, Brock Akil became a consulting producer and writer for the ABC suburban sitcom Cougar Town.

Following the launch of the CW network, Brock Akil created a spin-off series to her first show that follows the life of Joan's cousin, Melanie Barnett, played by Tia Mowry. She places her dreams of being a doctor on hold and moves to San Diego to be a supportive backbone to her boyfriend, professional football player Derwin Davis, played by Pooch Hall. The series ran on the CW network for three seasons until its abrupt ending in 2009. The show was canceled for about two years until it was picked up by BET and began production in Atlanta. The Game brought in 7.7 million viewers in its Season 4 premiere on BET. After adding six more seasons to the series, the network released a statement on its website stating that the show would conclude after production of the seventh and eighth seasons.

=== 2009–2020 ===
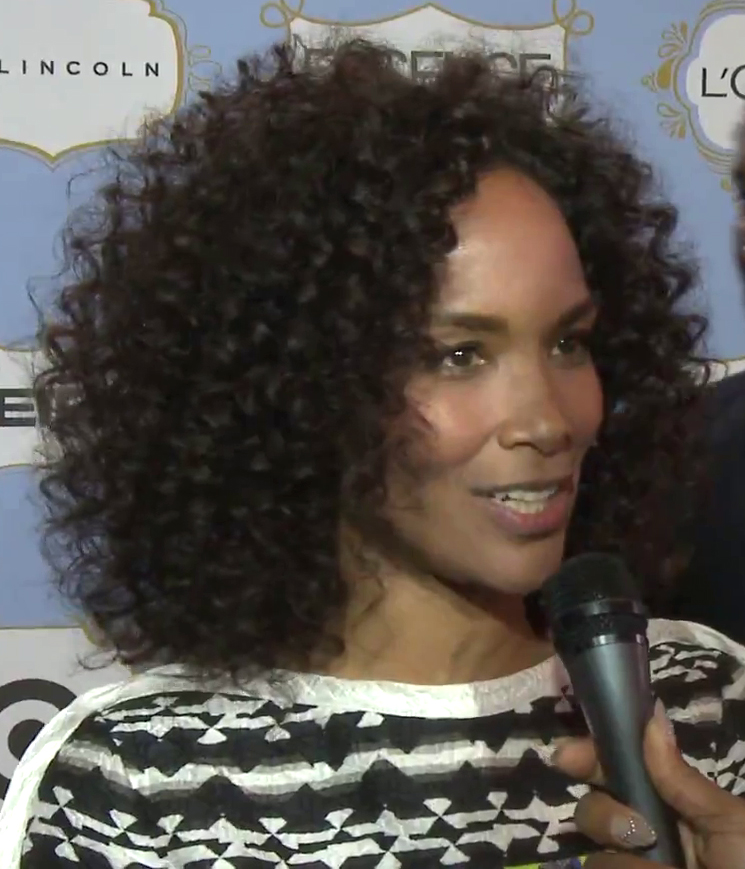
Brock Akil at Essence Women in Hollywood Awards in February 2013.

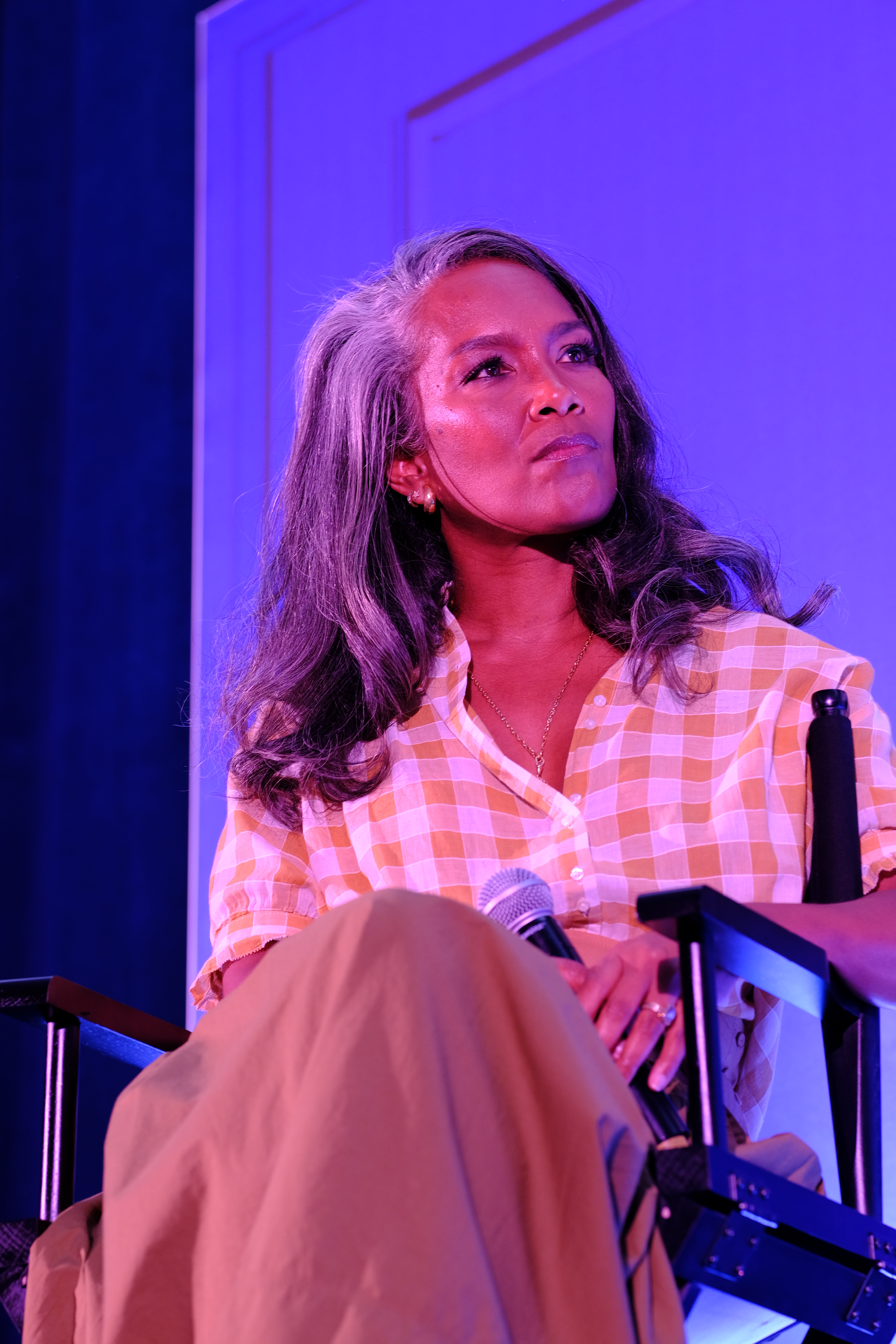
Brock Akil at Essence Festival of Culture in July 2025.

She is the creator of BET's Being Mary Jane, starring Gabrielle Union premiered July 2, 2013, and became the couple's first hour-long scripted show. The show chronicles the life of Mary Jane Paul, a successful news anchor, and attempts to address the statistic that within the Black community 42% of successful women will never marry. In 2015 she signed a deal with Warner Bros. Television which went into effect in May 2016.

On March 22, 2017, it was reported that Brock Akil had left ICM Partners to join Creative Artists Agency (CAA) as her talent agency.

The Akils created and executive produced a scripted superhero series, Black Lightning, based on DC Comics' Black Lightning series. The show premiered on January 16, 2018.

=== 2020–present ===
On January 7, 2020, it was announced that Brock Akil had signed a script deal with Fox Entertainment to develop a series for the Fox broadcast network. On September 9, it was announced that she had signed a multi-year overall deal with Netflix to produce new content.

On September 27, 2021, she announced the launch of her new production company Story27 under her Netflix deal and the titles of three series and one documentary being developed.

== Personal life ==
Brock Akil is a fan of the Kansas City Chiefs team in the NFL. Along with friends Gina Prince-Bythewood, Sara Finney-Johnson and Felicia D. Henderson, she endows The Four Sisters Scholarship which began in 2005. She has been a supporter of Habitat for Humanity, even featuring them on the season six premiere of Girlfriends. Speaking in the 2020s, Brock Akil stated she begins her morning drinking lemon water and alkaline water, before drinking green tea or matcha latte later in the day; she begins intermittent fasting after 8 PM or 9 PM, excluding Fridays and Saturdays; she likes to cook baked chicken with vegetables and brown rice for her family on Sundays; and she loves to journal, especially before bedtime.

=== Family and religion ===
Mara Brock Akil is one of six siblings consisting of William Brock III, former actress Kara Bustos, half-brothers Shamsie and Saiid Shamsuddin, and half-sister Chi'Mere Banks through their father Wali Shamsuddin. Her brothers Shamsie and William are deceased; the latter died in September 2020.

She is married to Salim Akil who is also a producer, director and screenwriter. Their first encounter was in 1997 at Insomnia Cafe on Beverly Boulevard—where Mara often spent time writing—when Salim was visiting Los Angeles from the Bay Area while finishing work on his debut film Drylongso that he co-wrote. Their second encounter was in 1998 at a furniture shop on Melrose Avenue, by which point Salim had moved to LA to attend Columbia College Hollywood. They began dating before getting married in April 1999. The couple have two children together: Yasin Ali Akil (born 2004) and Nasir Lukmon Akil (born 2009). Salim also has an older daughter and an older son predating his marriage and is a grandfather.

She and her husband are Sufi Muslims. Mara Brock had been born into a Muslim household that followed the Nation of Islam. After her divorcee mother Joan Fullmore left California with her children and relocated to Missouri, they practiced Christianity—at first following the United Methodist Church, attending Emanuel Cleaver's congregation, and later following the African Methodist Episcopal Church. Mara Brock reverted to Islam at some point before or during her relationship with Salim Akil. In their semi-autobiographical TV series Love Is, the character of Nuri is depicted as being a non-practicing Muslim at the time she began dating Yasir, a practicing Muslim.

=== Legal issues ===
In 2006, Staci Robinson filed a $40 million lawsuit against Brock Akil and The CW, accusing Brock Akil of stealing the concept of her TV series The Game from Robinson's then-unpublished novel Interceptions from when she allegedly showed it to her in 2001. Robinson argued she had thought of the show first because her novel chronicles the life of Stefanie Porter, a senior studying law at UCLA, who ceases her hopes of becoming a lawyer to support the dreams of her boyfriend, star football player Ricky Powers.

The Akils created Love is, which was based on their relationship, but was canceled after a woman accused Salim of domestic violence in an alleged extramarital affair, as well as copyright infringement by using her screenplay as the basis for the series. A statement made by Akil's lawyers denied all allegations.

== Filmography ==
=== Films ===
Year	Title	Executive producer	Writer	Notes
1994	With Honors	No	No	Actress
2012	Sparkle	Yes	Yes	
2015	The Start Up	Yes	No	Television film
2023	Stamped from the Beginning	Yes	No	Documentary

=== Television ===
Year	Title	Creator	Producer	Writer	Director	Notes
1993–1994	The Sinbad Show	No	No	No	No	Uncredited production assistant Also actress: "Keep the Faith"
1994	South Central	No	No	Yes	No	Uncredited WGA Writers' Trainee
1995	Dave's World	No	No	No	No	Uncredited production assistant
1996–1999	Moesha	No	Yes	Yes	No	Producer: 22 episodes Writer: 9 episodes Also story editor: 9 episodes
1999–2000	The Jamie Foxx Show	No	Yes	Yes	No	Supervising producer: 24 episodes Executive producer: 1 episode Writer: 4 episodes
2000–2008	Girlfriends	Yes	Yes	Yes	No	Executive producer Also uncredited actress: "The Game"
2006–2009, 2011–2015	The Game	Yes	Yes	Yes	Yes	Executive producer Director: "Dust in the Wind"
2009	Leading Women	No	No	No	No	Documentary; Self: Episode 2
2010	Cougar Town	No	Yes	Yes	No	Consulting producer: 22 episodes Writer: 2 episodes
2013–2015, 2017, 2019	Being Mary Jane	Yes	Yes	Yes	No	Executive producer
2015	Reed Between the Lines	No	Yes	No	No	Executive producer: 3 episodes
2018	Love Is	Yes	Yes	Yes	Yes	Executive producer Director: 2 episodes
2018–2021	Black Lightning	No	Yes	No	No	Executive producer
2020	Make It Work!	No	No	No	No	Television special; Self
2021	On Story	No	No	No	No	Season 12, episode 9
2021	History of the Sitcom	No	No	No	No	Documentary; Self: 3 episodes
2021–2023	The Game	Yes	Yes	No	No	Executive producer
2023	See It Loud: The History of Black Television	No	No	No	No	Documentary; Self: 3 episodes
2025–present	Forever	Yes	Yes	Yes	Yes	Executive producer Director: "The Vineyard"
2025	Seen & Heard: The History of Black Television	No	No	No	No	Documentary; Self: 2 episodes

== Awards and nominations ==
Award	Date	Category	Nominee	Result
AAFCA TV Honors	August 23, 2025	Legacy Award	Herself	Won
American Black Film Festival	March 3, 2024	Industry Visionary Award	Herself	Won
BET Comedy; Awards	September 28, 2004	Outstanding Comedy Series	Girlfriends	Nominated
BET Comedy; Awards	September 28, 2004	Outstanding Writing for a Comedy Series	Girlfriends	Nominated
BET Comedy; Awards	September 27, 2005	Outstanding Comedy Series	Girlfriends	Nominated
BET Comedy; Awards	September 27, 2005	Outstanding Writing for a Comedy Series	Girlfriends	Won
Black Entertainment and Sports Lawyers Association	November 13–17, 2024	Trailblazer Award	Herself	Won
Black Girls Rock!	October 26, 2013	Shot Caller Award	Herself	Won
Black Reel; Awards	February 7, 2013	Outstanding Screenplay, Original or Adapted	Sparkle	Nominated
Black Reel; Awards	February 13, 2014	Outstanding TV Movie or Mini-Series	Being Mary Jane	Nominated
Black Reel; Awards	February 13, 2014	Outstanding Screenplay (Original or Adapted), TV Movie or Mini-Series	Being Mary Jane	Won
Black Reel; Awards	February 23, 2018	Outstanding Drama Series (shared with Salim Akil, Greg Berlantir, Adam Giaudrone, Sarah Schechter, Jennifer Lence, Carl Ogawa, Melora Rivera, Joanie L. Woehler, Bonnie Weis)	Black Lightning	Nominated
Black Women Film Network	March 5, 2022	RainmakHER Award	Herself	Won
Hollywood Confidential	October 1, 2026	Icon Award	Herself	Won
Primetime Emmy Awards	September 7, 2024	Exceptional Merit in Documentary Filmmaking (shared with Alisa Payne, Roger Ross Williams, David Teague, Ibram X. Kendi)	Stamped from the Beginning	Nominated
Essence Black Women In Hollywood Awards	February 21, 2013	Visionary Award	Herself	Won
Gotham TV Awards	June 2, 2025	Breakthrough Drama Series	Forever	Nominated
Gracie Awards	May 24, 2016	Outstanding Drama	Being Mary Jane	Nominated
IndieWire Honors	June 5, 2025	Visionary Award	Herself	Won
NAACP Image; Awards	March 3, 2002	Outstanding Comedy Series	Girlfriends	Nominated
NAACP Image; Awards	March 8, 2003	Outstanding Comedy Series	Girlfriends	Nominated
NAACP Image; Awards	March 6, 2004	Outstanding Comedy Series	Girlfriends	Nominated
NAACP Image; Awards	March 19, 2005	Outstanding Comedy Series	Girlfriends	Nominated
NAACP Image; Awards	February 26, 2006	Outstanding Comedy Series	Girlfriends	Nominated
NAACP Image; Awards	March 2, 2007	Outstanding Comedy Series	Girlfriends	Nominated
NAACP Image; Awards	March 2, 2007	Outstanding Writing in a Comedy Series	Girlfriends (For "After the Storm")	Nominated
NAACP Image; Awards	February 14, 2008	Outstanding Comedy Series	Girlfriends	Nominated
NAACP Image; Awards	February 12, 2009	Outstanding Comedy Series	The Game	Nominated
NAACP Image; Awards	February 17, 2012	Outstanding Comedy Series	The Game	Nominated
NAACP Image; Awards	February 1, 2013	Outstanding Comedy Series	The Game	Nominated
NAACP Image; Awards	February 17, 2012	Outstanding Writing in a Comedy Series (shared with Salim Akil)	The Game (For "Parachutes...Beach Chairs")	Won
NAACP Image; Awards	February 22, 2014	Outstanding Writing in a Dramatic Series	The Game (For "Blueprint Part 1" and "Blueprint Part 2")	Nominated
NAACP Image; Awards	February 6, 2015	Outstanding Drama Series	Being Mary Jane	Nominated
NAACP Image; Awards	February 6, 2015	Outstanding Writing in a Dramatic Series	Being Mary Jane (For "Über Love")	Nominated
NAACP Image; Awards	February 5, 2016	Outstanding Drama Series	Being Mary Jane	Nominated
NAACP Image; Awards	February 5, 2016	Outstanding Writing in a Dramatic Series (shared with Jameal Turner, Keli Golf)	Being Mary Jane (For "Sparrow")	Nominated
NAACP Image; Awards	February 22, 2020	Outstanding Television Movie, Limited Series or Dramatic Special	Being Mary Jane	Nominated
National Association of Television Program Executives	January 22, 2019	Brandon Tartikoff Legacy Award	Herself	Won
NAMIC Vision; Awards	April 15, 2009	Comedy	The Game	Nominated
NAMIC Vision; Awards	April 24, 2012	Comedy	The Game	Nominated
NAMIC Vision; Awards	July 11, 2013	Comedy	The Game	Nominated
NAMIC Vision; Awards	April 23, 2014	Original Movie or Special	Being Mary Jane	Nominated
NAMIC Vision; Awards	May 2, 2016	Drama	Being Mary Jane	Won
NAMIC Vision; Awards	February 22, 2017	Drama	Being Mary Jane	Won
Peabody Awards	May 31, 2026		Forever	Won
Producers Guild of America Awards	May 29, 2026	Norman Lear Achievement Award	Forever	Won
SHINE Awards	October 26, 1999	Comedy Episode	Moesha (For "Birth Control")	Won
SHINE Awards	October 24, 2001	Comedy Episode	Girlfriends (For "The Burning Vagina Monologues")	Won
SHINE Awards	October 18, 2003	Comedy Episode	Girlfriends (For "The Pact")	Nominated
SHINE Awards	October 18, 2003	Series Storyline	Girlfriends (For "AIDS Documentary")	Nominated
Teen Choice Awards	August 10, 2014	Choice TV: Breakout Show	Being Mary Jane	Nominated
