= HDP =

HDP may refer to:

== Politics ==
- Free Democratic Party (Turkey) (Turkish: Hür Demokrat Parti), in Turkey; defunct
- Hazara Democratic Party, in Pakistan
- Peoples' Democratic Party (Turkey) (Turkish: Halkların Demokratik Partisi), in Turkey

== Science and technology ==
- Hemodialysis product
- HD Photo, a graphics file format
- Health Device Profile, a Bluetooth profile
- Heme ligase, an enzyme
- Hierarchical decision process
- Hierarchical Dirichlet process, a stochastic process
- High-density plasma, a type of plasma (physics)
- Hurricane Destruction Potential
- Hydrocarbon dew point
- Hydroxypropyl distarch phosphate, a starch

== Other uses ==
- "HDP" a 2025 episode of the sci-fi television series Pluribus
- HDP (album), an album of Czech hip-hop group Prago Union
- Hadapsar railway station, in India
- Harness, Dickey & Pierce, an intellectual property law firm
- Heritage Documentation Programs of the United States National Park Service
- Historical Dictionary Project of the Hebrew Language
- Hortonworks, an American software company
