= Lemelson–MIT Prize =

American award to inventors

The Lemelson–MIT Program awards several prizes yearly to inventors in the United States. The largest is the Lemelson–MIT Prize which was endowed in 1994 by Jerome H. Lemelson, funded by the Lemelson Foundation, and is administered through the School of Engineering at the Massachusetts Institute of Technology. The winner receives $500,000, making it the largest cash prize for invention in the U.S.

The $100,000 Lemelson–MIT Award for Global Innovation (previously named the Award for Sustainability) was last awarded in 2013. The Award for Global Innovation replaced the $100,000 Lemelson–MIT Lifetime Achievement Award, which was awarded from 1995 to 2006. The Lifetime Achievement Award recognized outstanding individuals whose pioneering spirit and inventiveness throughout their careers improved society and inspired others.

The Lemelson–MIT Program also awards invention prizes for graduate students, called the Lemelson–MIT Student Prize.

== List of Lemelson–MIT Prize winners ==
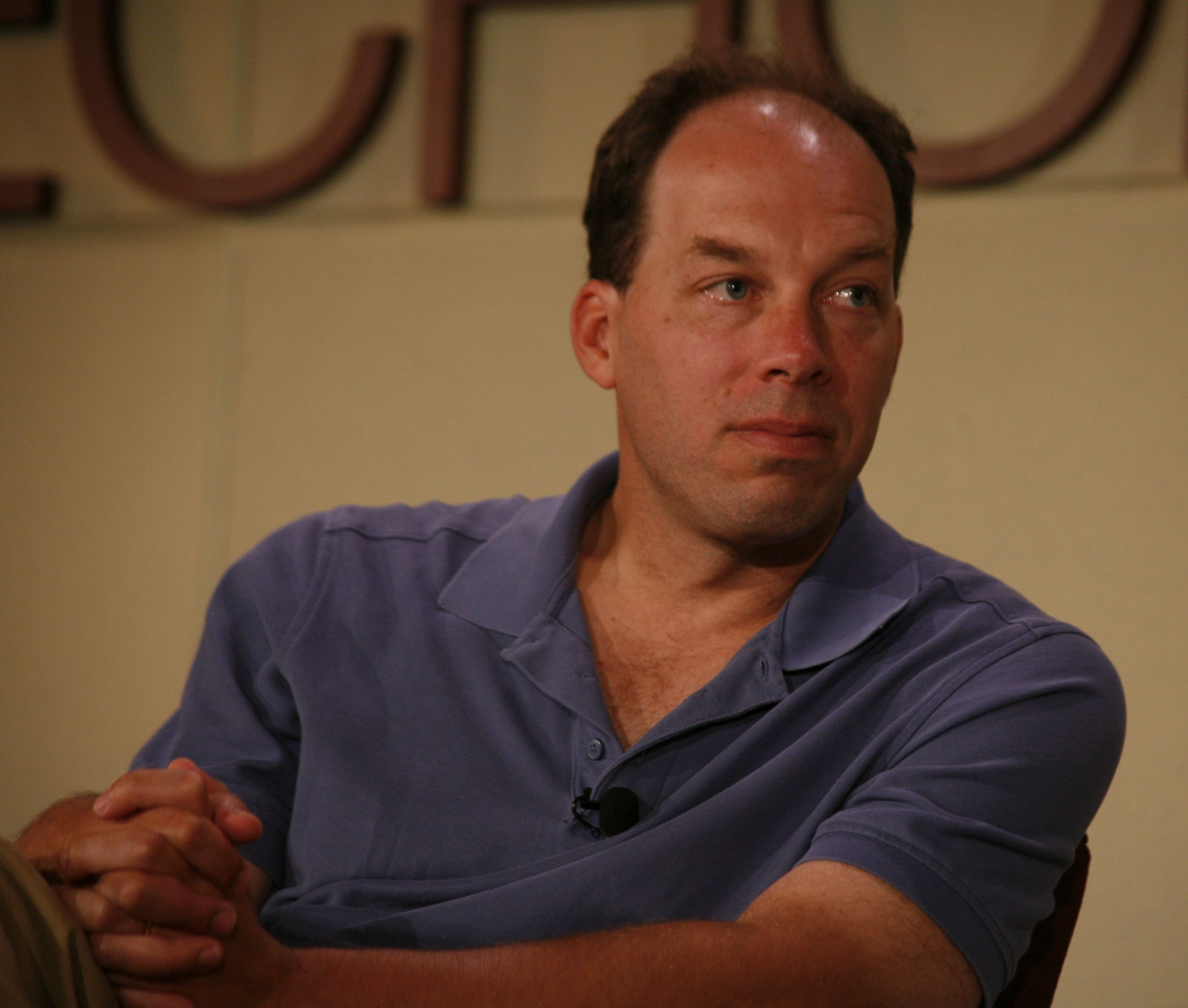
Stephen Quake

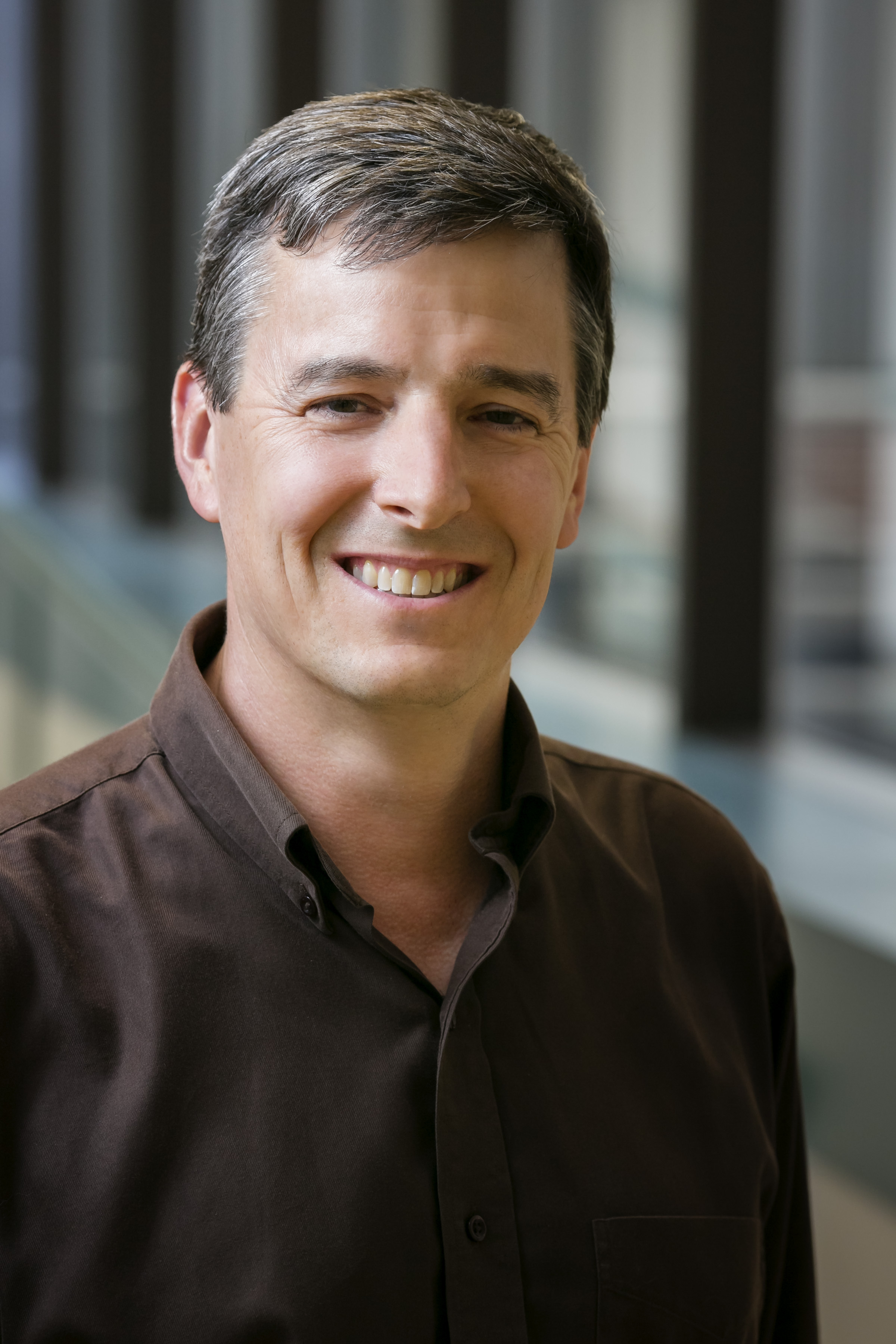
John A. Rogers

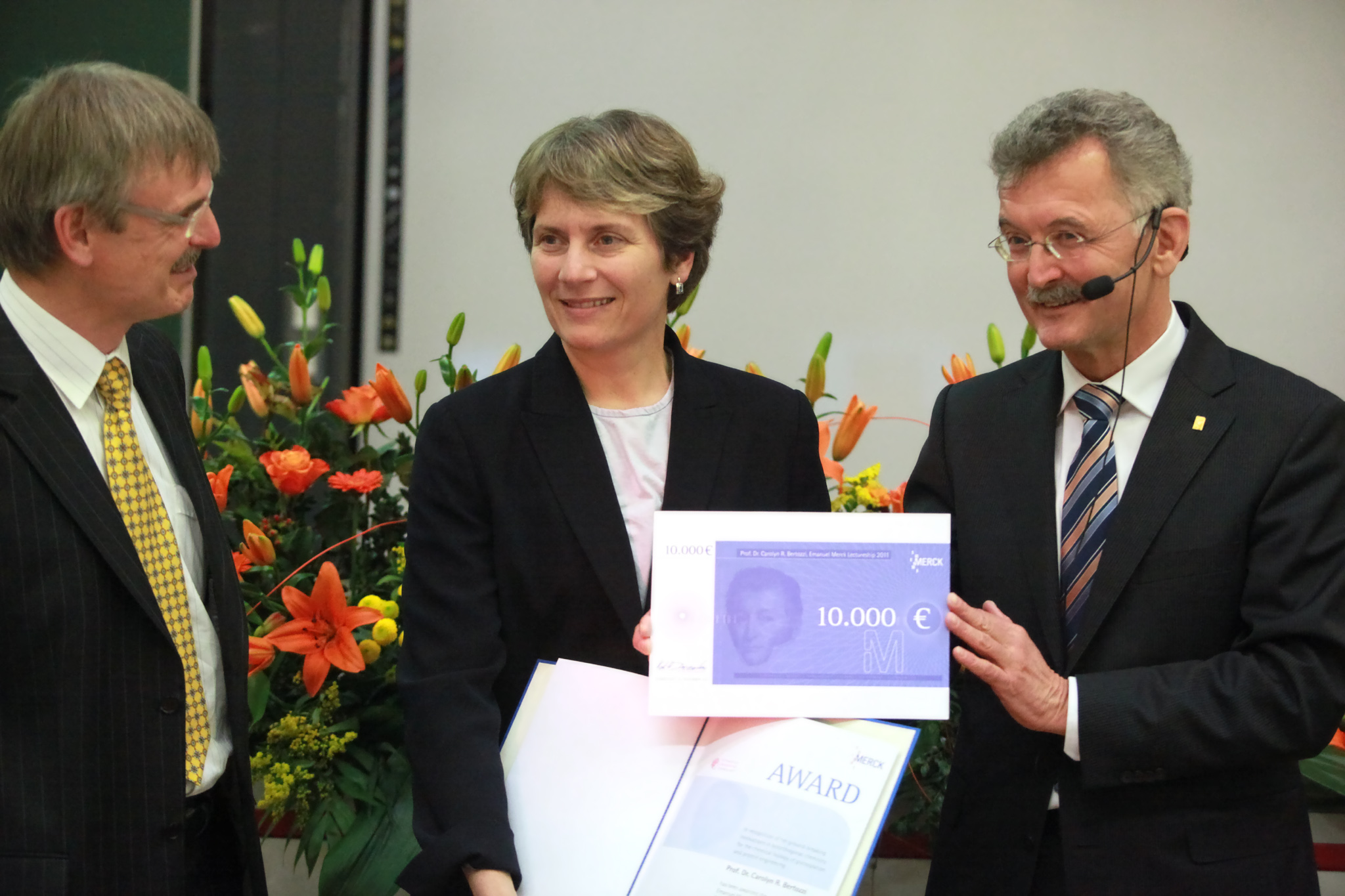
Carolyn Bertozzi, receiving the Emanuel Merck Lectureship in 2011

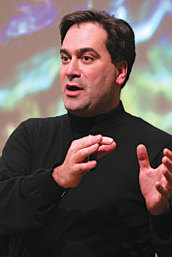
Chad Mirkin

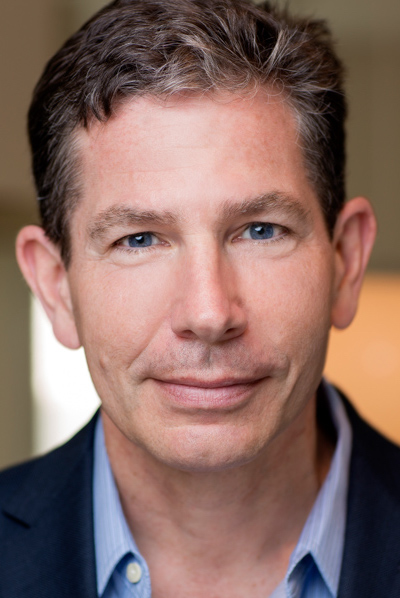
Joel Selanikio

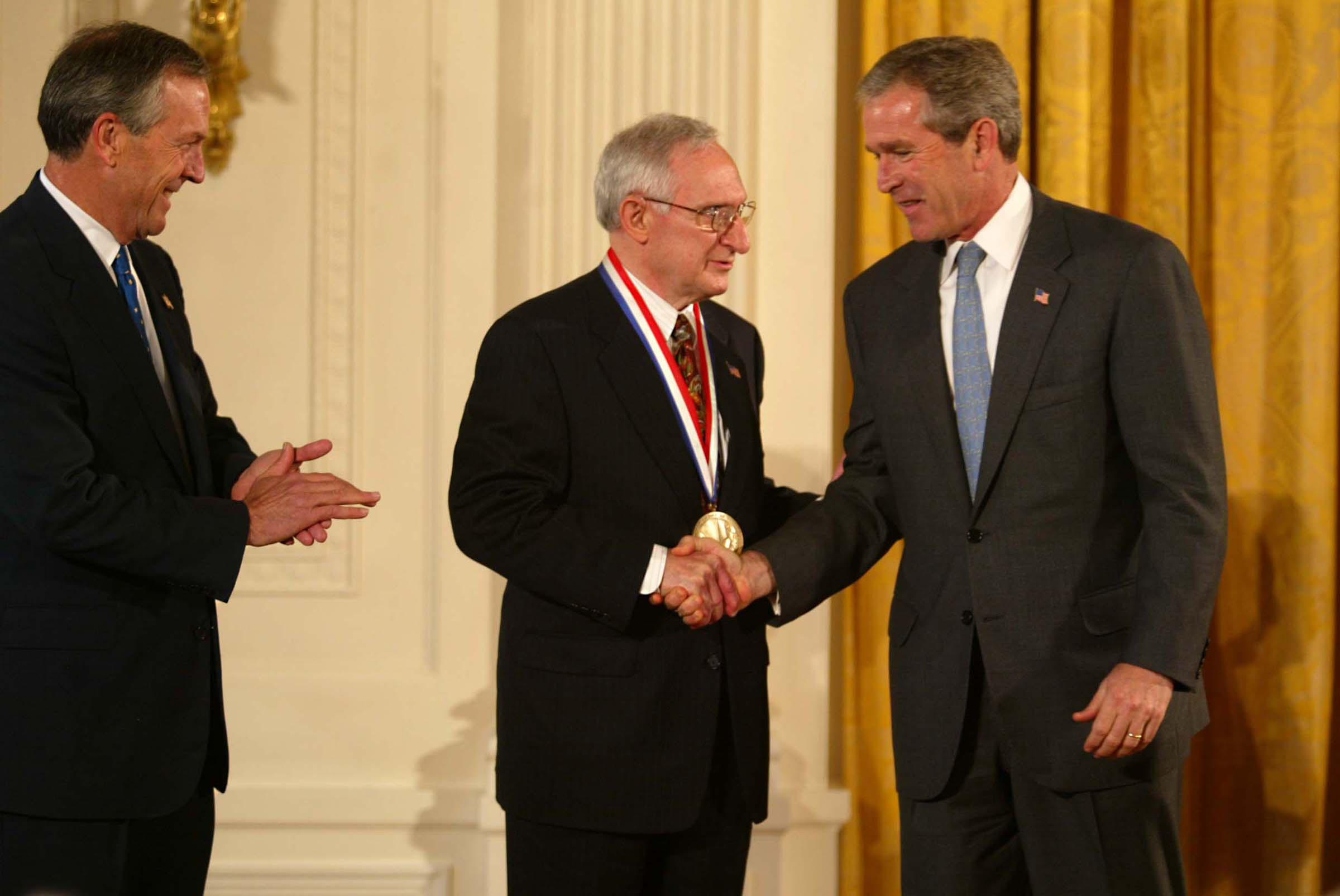
Sidney Pestka (middle) receives the National Medal of Technology from President George W. Bush (right).

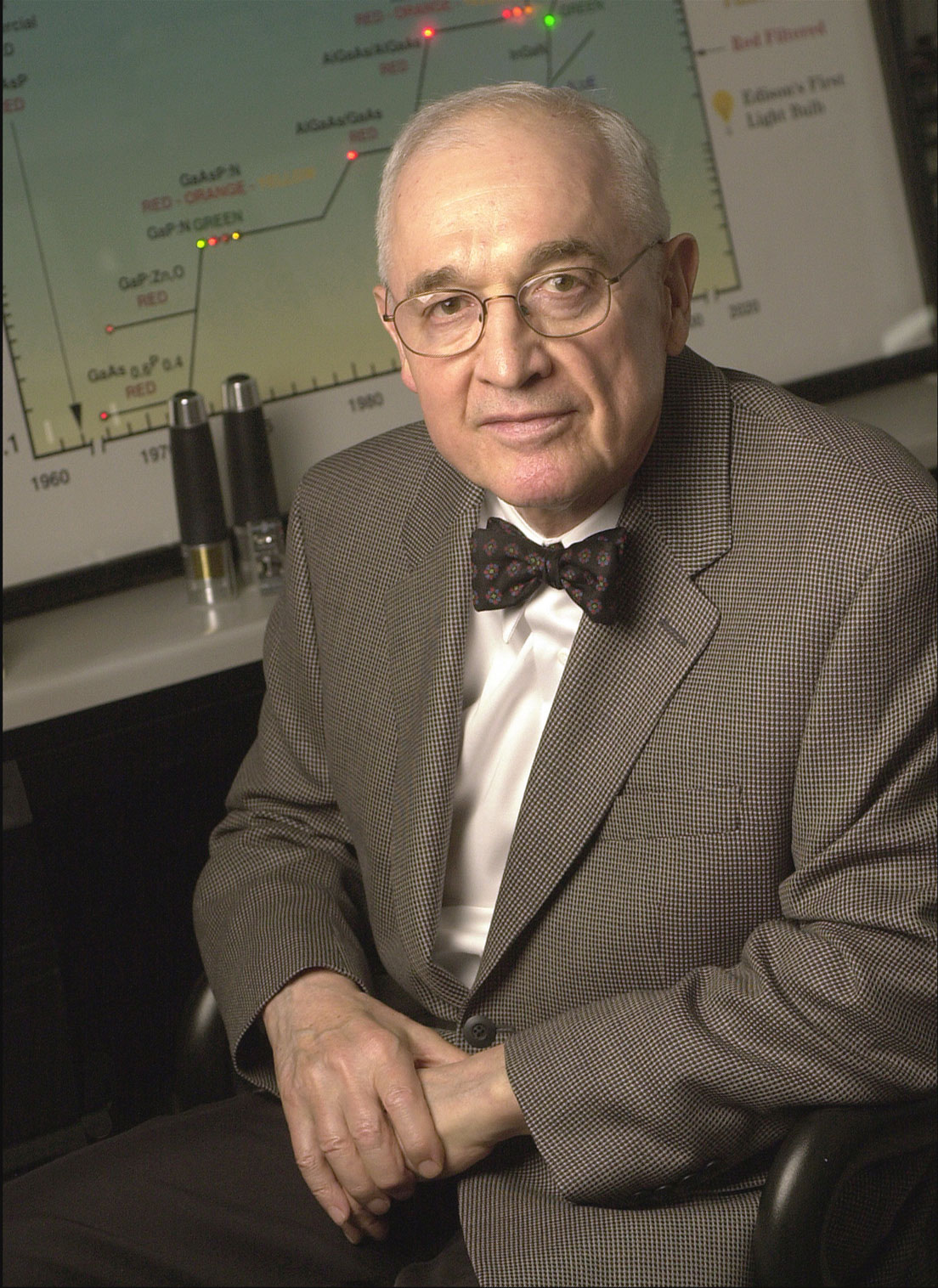
Nick Holonyak Jr.

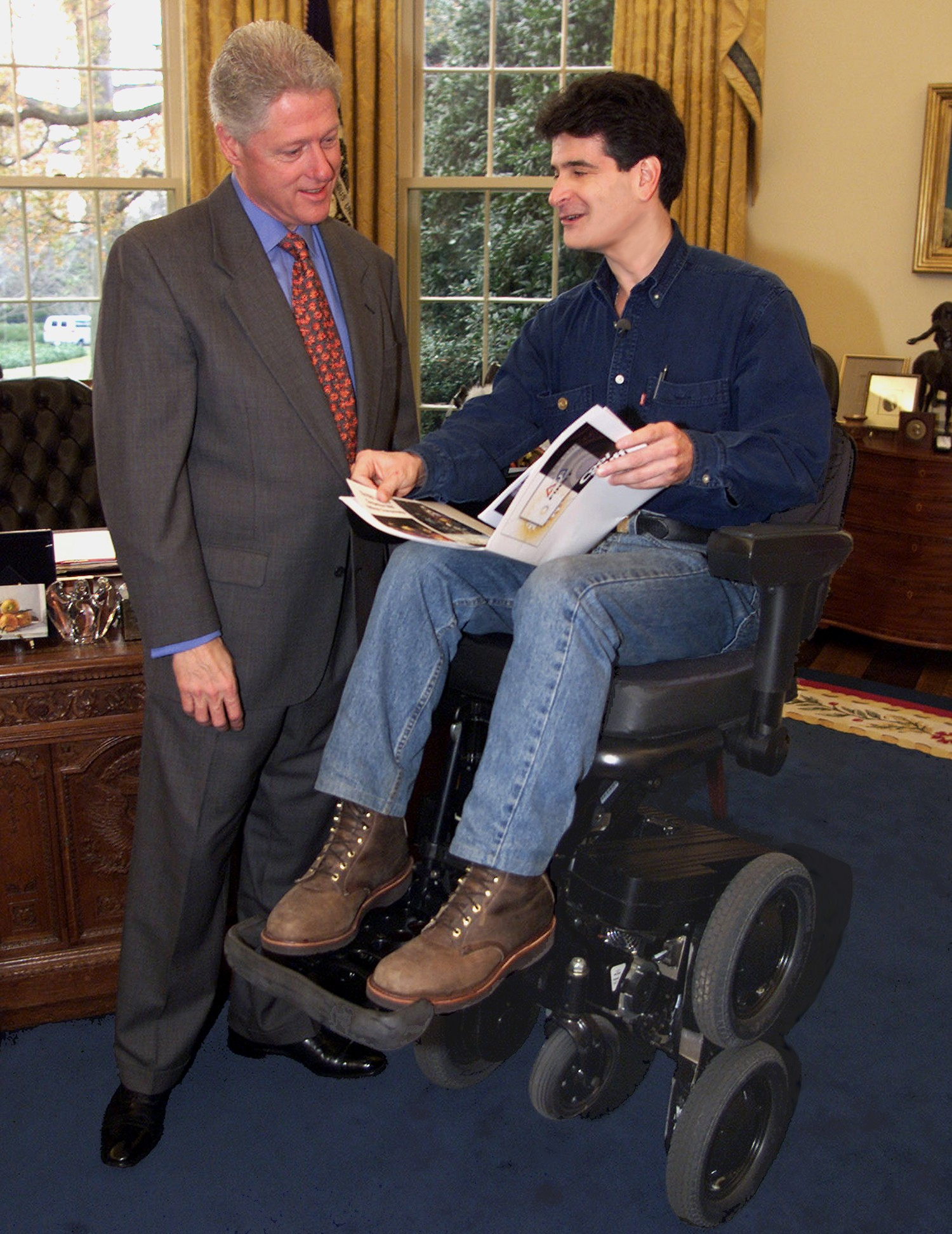
President Clinton and Dean Kamen in the White House, Kamen riding the iBOT Mobility System

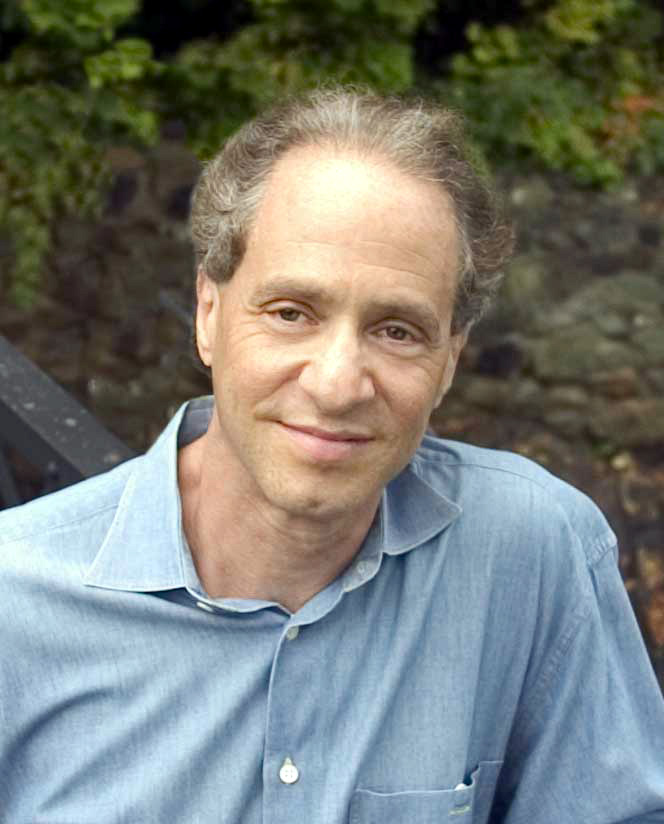
Ray Kurzweil

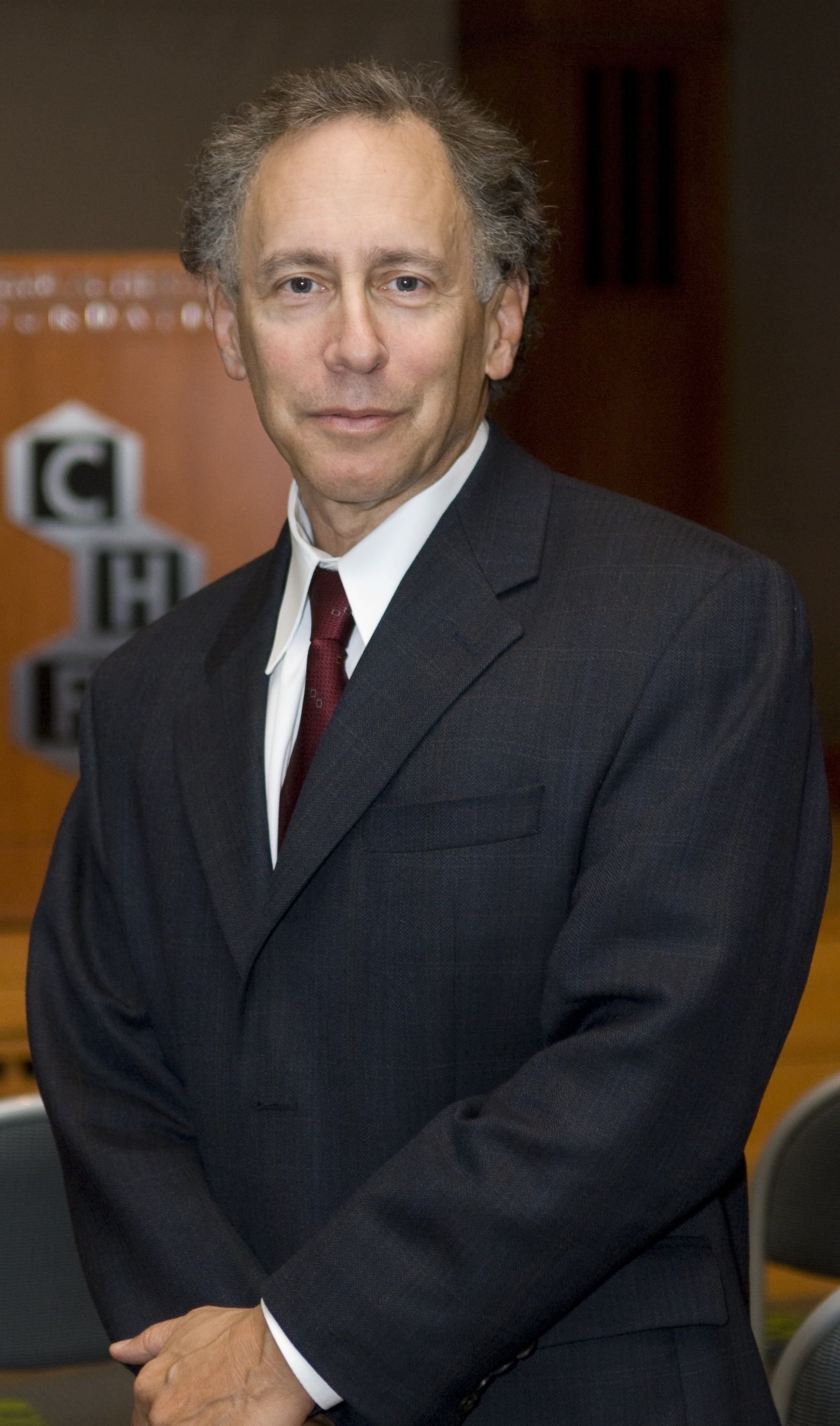
Bob Langer

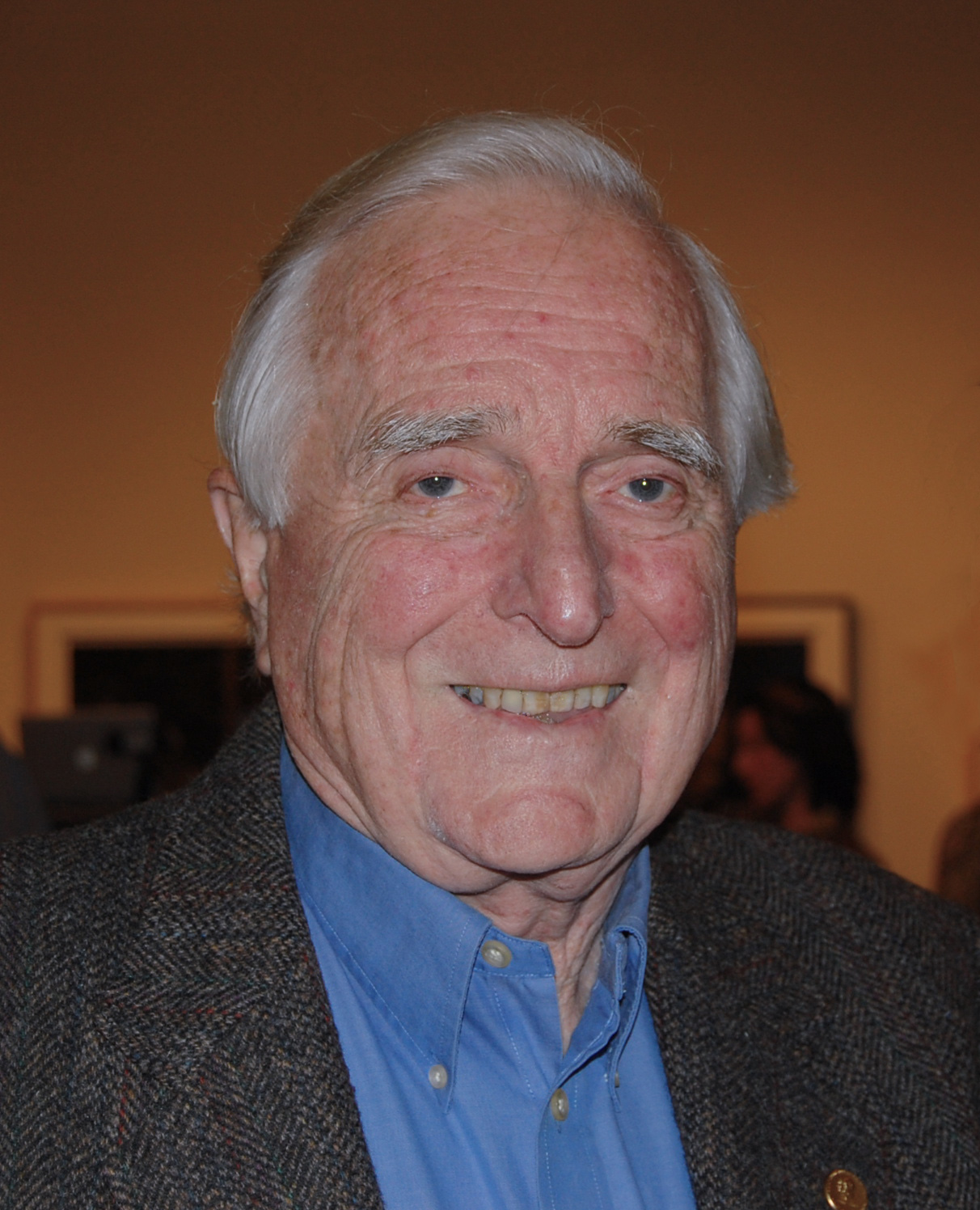
Douglas Engelbart

2019

- Cody Friesen (Lemelson–MIT Prize)

2018

- Luis von Ahn (Lemelson–MIT Prize)

2017

- Feng Zhang (Lemelson–MIT Prize)

2016

- Ramesh Raskar (Lemelson–MIT Prize)

2015

- Jay Whitacre (Lemelson–MIT Prize)

2014

- Sangeeta N. Bhatia (Lemelson–MIT Prize)

2013

- Angela Belcher (Lemelson–MIT Prize)
- Rebecca Richards-Kortum and Maria Oden (Lemelson–MIT Award for Global Innovation)

2012

- Stephen Quake (Lemelson–MIT Prize) (Scientist, Inventor, Entrepreneur, Professor of Biophysics and Genomics at Stanford University)
- Ashok Gadgil (Lemelson–MIT Award for Global Innovation)

2011

- John A. Rogers (Lemelson–MIT Prize) (Professor, Physical Chemist, and Materials Scientist at Northwestern University)
- Elizabeth Hausler (Lemelson–MIT Award for Sustainability)

2010

- Carolyn Bertozzi (Lemelson–MIT Prize)
- BP Agrawal (Lemelson–MIT Award for Sustainability)

2009

- Chad Mirkin (Lemelson–MIT Prize), George B. Rathmann Professor of Chemistry, Professor of Medicine, Professor of Materials Science and Engineering, Professor of Biomedical Engineering, and Professor of Chemical and Biological Engineering, and Director of the International Institute for Nanotechnology and Center for Nanofabrication and Molecular Self-Assembly at Northwestern University
- Joel Selanikio (Lemelson–MIT Award for Sustainability), CEO and co-founder, Magpi, and Assistant Professor of Pediatrics, Georgetown University Hospital

2008

- Joseph DeSimone (Lemelson–MIT Prize)
- Martin Fisher (Lemelson–MIT Award for Sustainability)

2007

- Timothy M. Swager (Lemelson–MIT Prize)
- Lee Lynd (Lemelson–MIT Award for Sustainability)

2006

- James Fergason (Lemelson–MIT Prize) for his liquid crystal display innovations.
- Sidney Pestka (Lemelson–MIT Lifetime Achievement Award)

2005

- Robert Dennard (Lemelson–MIT Lifetime Achievement Award)

2004

- Nick Holonyak Jr. (Lemelson–MIT Prize) (John Bardeen Endowed Chair Emeritus in Electrical and Computer Engineering and Physics at the University of Illinois at Urbana-Champaign)
- Edith M. Flanigen (Lemelson–MIT Lifetime Achievement Award)

2003

- Leroy Hood (Lemelson–MIT Prize) for his invention of four devices that have helped unlock the human genome, including the automated DNA sequencer.
- William P. Murphy Jr. (Lemelson–MIT Lifetime Achievement Award)

2002

- Dean Kamen (Lemelson–MIT Prize) for his invention of the Segway and of an infusion pump for diabetics.
- Ruth R. Benerito (Lemelson–MIT Lifetime Achievement Award)

2001

- Raymond Kurzweil (Lemelson–MIT Prize) (Author, Computer scientist, Inventor and Futurist at Google)
- Raymond Damadian (Lemelson–MIT Lifetime Achievement Award) for his work in magnetic resonance imaging (MRI).

2000

- Thomas Fogarty (Lemelson–MIT Prize)
- Al Gross (Lemelson–MIT Lifetime Achievement Award) for his invention of the first walkie-talkie, CB radio, the telephone pager, and the cordless telephone.

1999

- Carver Mead (Lemelson–MIT Prize)
- Stephanie Kwolek (Lemelson–MIT Lifetime Achievement Award) for her work on liquid-crystalline polymers and the development of the armored fabric Kevlar.

1998

- Robert Langer (Lemelson–MIT Prize) (David H. Koch Institute Professor at the Massachusetts Institute of Technology)
- Jacob Rabinow (Lemelson–MIT Lifetime Achievement Award) for the first disc-shaped magnetic storage media for computers, the magnetic particle clutch, the first straight-line phonograph, the first self-regulating clock, and a "reading machine" which was the first to use the "best match" principle.

1997

- Douglas Engelbart (Lemelson–MIT Prize) (computer and Internet pioneer) for his invention of the computer mouse.
- Gertrude Elion (Lemelson–MIT Lifetime Achievement Award) for the following inventions:
  - 6-mercaptopurine (Purinethol), the first treatment for leukemia.
  - azathioprine (Imuran), the first immunosuppressive agent, used for organ transplants.
  - allopurinol (Zyloprim), for gout.
  - pyrimethamine (Daraprim), for malaria.
  - trimethoprim (Septra), for meningitis, sepsis, and bacterial infections of the urinary and respiratory tracts.
  - acyclovir (Zovirax), for herpes simplex virus infection.

1996

- Stanley Norman Cohen (Co-recipient, Lemelson–MIT Prize) for the development of methods to combine and transplant genes.
- Herbert Boyer (Co-recipient, Lemelson–MIT Prize) for the development of methods to combine and transplant genes.
- Wilson Greatbatch (Lemelson–MIT Lifetime Achievement Award) for the development of batteries for the early implantable cardiac pacemakers.

1995

- William Bolander (Lemelson–MIT Prize)
- William Hewlett (Co-recipient, Lemelson–MIT Lifetime Achievement Award)
- David Packard (Co-recipient, Lemelson–MIT Lifetime Achievement Award)

== List of Lemelson–MIT Student Prize winners ==
2021

- Paige Balcom (Use It! Lemelson–MIT Graduate Student Prize)
- Nicole Black (Cure It! Lemelson–MIT Graduate Student Prize)
- Mira Moufarrej (Cure It! Lemelson–MIT Graduate Student Prize)
- Bruce Enzmann, Michael Lan, and Anson Zhou (Cure It! Lemelson–MIT Undergraduate Student Prize)
- Hilary Johnson (Eat It! Lemelson–MIT Graduate Student Prize)
- Benjamin Johnson and Zane Zents (Eat It! Lemelson–MIT Undergraduate Student Prize)
- Maya Burhanpurkar and Seung Hwan An (Move It! Lemelson–MIT Undergraduate Student Prize)

2020

- Daniela Blanco (Use It! Lemelson–MIT Graduate Student Prize)
- Shriya Srinivasan (Cure It! Lemelson–MIT Graduate Student Prize)
- Tzu-Chieh (Zijay) Tang (Eat It! Lemelson–MIT Graduate Student Prize)

2019

- Arnav Kapur (Use It! Lemelson–MIT Graduate Student Prize)
- Mercy Asiedu (Cure It! Lemelson–MIT Graduate Student Prize)
- Julie Bliss Mullen (Eat It! Lemelson–MIT Graduate Student Prize)
- Federico Scurti (Move It! Lemelson–MIT Graduate Student Prize)

2018

- Kayla Nguyen (Use It! Lemelson–MIT Graduate Student Prize)
- Tyler Clites (Cure It! Lemelson–MIT Graduate Student Prize)
- Maher Damak (Eat It! Lemelson–MIT Graduate Student Prize)
- Guy Satat (Drive It! Lemelson–MIT Graduate Student Prize)

2017

- Apoorva Murarka (Use It! Lemelson–MIT Graduate Student Prize)
- Lisa Tostanoski (Cure It! Lemelson–MIT Graduate Student Prize)
- Katy Olesnavage (Cure It! Lemelson–MIT Graduate Student Prize)
- Tony Tao (Drive It! Lemelson–MIT Graduate Student Prize)
- Natasha Wright (Eat It! Lemelson–MIT Graduate Student Prize)

2016

- Achuta Kadambi (Use It! Lemelson–MIT Graduate Student Prize)
- Catalin Voss (Cure It! Lemelson–MIT Graduate Student Prize)
- Dan Dorsch (Drive It! Lemelson–MIT Graduate Student Prize)
- Heather Hava (Eat It! Lemelson–MIT Graduate Student Prize)

2015

- Carl Schoellhammer (Cure It! Lemelson–MIT Graduate Student Prize)
- Josh Siegel (Drive It! Lemelson–MIT Graduate Student Prize)
- Alexander Richter (Eat It! Lemelson–MIT Graduate Student Prize)

2014

- Benjamin Peters (Use It! Lemelson–MIT Graduate Student Prize)
- David Sengeh (Cure It! Lemelson–MIT Graduate Student Prize)

2013

- Nikolai Begg (Lemelson–MIT Graduate Student Prize)

2012

- Miles Barr (Lemelson–MIT Graduate Student Prize)

2011

- Alice Chen (Lemelson–MIT Graduate Student Prize)

2010

- Erez Lieberman-Aiden (Lemelson–MIT Graduate Student Prize)

2009

- Geoffrey von Maltzahn (Lemelson–MIT Graduate Student Prize)

2008

- Timothy Lu (Lemelson–MIT Graduate Student Prize)

2007

- Nate Ball (Lemelson–MIT Graduate Student Prize)

2006

- Carl Dietrich (Lemelson–MIT Graduate Student Prize)

2005

- David Berry (Lemelson–MIT Graduate Student Prize)

2004

- Saul Griffith (Lemelson–MIT Graduate Student Prize)

2003

- James McLurkin (Lemelson–MIT Graduate Student Prize)

2002

- Andrew Heafitz (Lemelson–MIT Graduate Student Prize)

2001

- Brian Hubert (Lemelson–MIT Graduate Student Prize)

2000

- Amy Smith (Lemelson–MIT Graduate Student Prize)

1999

- Daniel DiLorenzo (Lemelson–MIT Graduate Student Prize)

1998

- Akhil Madhani (Lemelson–MIT Graduate Student Prize)

1997

- Nathan Kane (Lemelson–MIT Graduate Student Prize)

1996

- David Levy (Lemelson–MIT Graduate Student Prize)

1995

- Thomas Massie (Lemelson–MIT Graduate Student Prize)

== See also ==
- List of engineering awards
- Lemelson Foundation
- Jerome H. Lemelson
