= Gerald D. Hosier =

American intellectual property attorney

Gerald D. Hosier (born April 1941) is an American intellectual property (IP) attorney and a patent litigator. In 2000, Forbes magazine declared him the highest-paid lawyer in America, with an annual income of $40 million.

== Early life ==
Hosier was born and raised on the southside of Chicago, Illinois, attending Carl Sandburg High School in Orland Park where he was a varsity football quarterback, varsity catcher on the baseball team and on the wrestling team, and an all-conference selection in all three sports. He was also a speed-skater, finishing third in the Tribune Silver Skates National meet at age 14. He was recruited by Northwestern quarterback coach, Dale Samuels, to Northwestern University, during the time Ara Parseghian was the renowned head coach. Hosier gave up college football in favor of baseball, lettering for 4 years on the NU varsity baseball team.

== Education ==
Gerald Hosier received a Bachelor of Science in Electrical Engineering from Northwestern University and obtained his Juris Doctor from DePaul University College of Law. He is also registered to practice before the United States Patent and Trademark Office as a registered patent attorney.

== Career and clients ==
He has served as the main attorney for Jerome H. Lemelson, the named inventor on 741 US patents, and the self-proclaimed inventor of bar code scanning. Although Lemelson died on October 1, 1997, Hosier continued to litigate to enforce Lemelson's patents on behalf of Lemelson's heirs, including the Lemelson Medical, Educational and Research Foundation (Lemelson Foundation). The American Lawyer reported his income for 1992 at $150 million. Lemelson was a noted philanthropist; Hosier was once known as a lavish spender, but Hosier has set up a Hosier family foundation that makes many charitable contributions, such as being a major sponsor of the Aspen Institute.l. Hosier and noted Silicon Valley venture capitalist, John Doerr, were the anchor donors for the 25,000 sq ft Doerr-Hosier Center at the Aspen Institute. Hosier is an avid pilot with over 4500 hours flight time. He holds private, multi-engine, instrument, commercial and airline transport pilot ratings and three jet type ratings in a Citation CJ1, a Falcon 2000 and a Gulfstream 550. He has owned a wide range of airplanes including two warbirds, an L-39 Albatros fighter jet and a Pilatus PC-7 military turboprop trainer. He currently owns and flies a Stemme S-10VT motor glider, a Twin Diamond DA62, a Pilatus PC-12 and a Gulfstream G550, which has a 14hr/6750NM range. He has been in over 70 countries with the G550.

In 2005, the key Lemelson patents on bar code scanning were declared invalid for prosecution laches, unduly delaying the patent application process so as to issue the patents long after the invention would have been thought to be public domain. This loss has reduced Hosier's income and influence. Hosier is on the board of trustees for the Aspen Institute.

Hosier has been characterized as a patent troll, in fact the "Babe Ruth of patent trolls," a statement attributed to Judge Kimberly Moore of the United States Court of Appeals for the Federal Circuit. Patent Attorney Raymond P. Niro credited his former partner Hosier with being the pioneer patent troll, disclaiming the honor for himself, citing a 2001 blog story bracketing a picture of Hosier with a picture of a troll.

Hosier won a $48 million award from Citigroup in 2011 in a case charging the "Citigroup misled their wealthiest clients and then tried to blame them for relying on what they were told." Hosier said Citigroup's Smith Barney unit was "out there manufacturing products with no utility whatsoever except for generating fees."
