= Robert Kearns =

American engineer and inventor

- Born: Robert William Kearns; March 10, 1927; Gary, Indiana, U.S.
- Died: February 9, 2005 (aged 77); Baltimore, Maryland, U.S.
- Education: University of Detroit Mercy (BSc); Wayne State University (MSc); Case Institute of Technology (PhD)
- Occupation: Mechanical Engineer
- Known for: Inventor of the intermittent windshield wiper

Robert William Kearns (March 10, 1927 – February 9, 2005) was an American mechanical engineer, educator, and inventor who invented the most common intermittent windshield wiper systems used on most automobiles from 1969 to the present. His first patent for the invention was filed on December 1, 1964, after a few previous designs by other inventors had failed to gain any traction in manufacturing.

Kearns won one of the best known patent infringement cases against Ford Motor Company (1978–1990) and a case against Chrysler Corporation (1982–1992). Having invented and patented the intermittent windshield wiper mechanism, which was useful in light rain or mist, he tried to interest the "Big Three" auto makers (General Motors, Ford, and Chrysler) in licensing the technology. Each rejected his proposal, yet began to install electronic intermittent wipers based on Kearns's design in their cars, beginning in 1969, when Ford rolled out the feature to its Mercury line.

Kearns's legal battle against Ford to protect his invention and patent was the subject of a 1993 article in The New Yorker magazine, which became the basis for a full-length biographical feature film titled Flash of Genius in 2008. Kearns was played by actor Greg Kinnear. Kearns had six children with his wife Phyllis, although they separated, supposedly as a result of the stress from the legal battle. He died of brain cancer at the age of 77.

== Education and early career ==
Kearns served in the US Army in intelligence related groups and tool manufacturing. He was a member of the Office of Strategic Services, the forerunner of the U.S. CIA, during World War II.

He earned a bachelor's degree in mechanical engineering from the University of Detroit Mercy, a master's degree in engineering mechanics from Wayne State University, and a doctorate from Case Institute of Technology.

== Intermittent wipers ==
Kearns claimed that the inspiration for his invention stems from an incident on his wedding night in 1953, when an errant champagne cork shot into his left eye, leaving him legally blind in that eye. Nearly a decade later in 1963, Kearns was driving his Ford Galaxie through a light rain, and the constant movement of the wiper blades irritated his already troubled vision.

He modeled his mechanism on the human eye, which blinks every few seconds, rather than continuously, presenting the idea to Ford. Ford representatives liked the idea, and hoped to rush it into at least one of their next model year's vehicles but later abandoned plans after Kearns had begun setting up manufacturing facilities for the invention.

When Ford introduced the feature in 1969, Kearns challenged the automaker, refusing offers of a settlement insisting that the case be heard in court, acting as his own lawyer. He began official legal proceedings some nine years later.

=== Lawsuits ===
The lawsuit against the Ford Motor Company was opened in 1978 and ended in 1990. Kearns sought $395 million in damages. He turned down a $30 million settlement offer in 1990 and took it to the jury, which awarded him $5.2 million; Ford agreed to pay $10.2 million rather than face another round of litigation.

Kearns mostly acted as his own attorney in the subsequent suit against Chrysler, which began in 1982, even questioning witnesses on the stand. The Chrysler verdict was decided in Kearns's favor in 1992. Chrysler was ordered to pay Kearns US$18.7 million with interest. Chrysler appealed the court decision, but the Federal Circuit let the judgment stand. The Supreme Court declined to hear the case. By 1995, after spending over US$10 million in legal fees, Kearns received approximately US$30 million in compensation for Chrysler's patent infringement.

Chrysler was represented by Harness, Dickey and Pierce, one of the first firms Kearns went to when he contemplated suing Ford in the late 1970s. Indeed, according to his son Dennis Kearns, Kearns wanted Harness, Dickey and Pierce removed for conflict of interest, but was unable to convince his attorneys to make a motion to remove the firm. He then decided to manage the Chrysler litigation on his own with his family.

Kearns filed lawsuits against manufacturers (and some dealers) of Ford, Porsche, Volkswagen, Ferrari, Volvo, Alfa Romeo, Lotus, Isuzu, Mitsubishi, Nissan, Peugeot, Renault, Rolls-Royce Motors, Saab, Toyota, General Motors, Mercedes-Benz as well as parts manufacturers such as United Technologies, and Bosch. Through decades of litigation, Kearns was dropped by three law firms and continued to serve as his own attorney. Several cases were dismissed after Kearns missed deadlines for the filing of papers.

His wife said, "He told me from day one, 'This is not about money,' no lawyer believed it."

==== Auto industry's legal argument ====
The legal argument that the auto industry posed in defense was that an invention is supposed to meet certain standards of originality and novelty ("flash of genius"). One of these is that it be "non-obvious". Ford claimed that the patent was invalid because Kearns's intermittent windshield wiper system had no new components (it used all "off-the-shelf" parts). Kearns noted that his invention was a novel and non-obvious combination of parts.

== Family and career ==
Robert Kearns was the son of Martin J. Kearns & Mary E. O'Hara. Kearns and his family moved to Montgomery Village, Maryland in 1971 where he worked for the National Bureau of Standards creating a standard for measuring skid resistance on roadways. His youngest son, 14 at the time and too young to be served court papers, answered the family's door when visitors arrived. In 1976, the intermittent wiper feature appeared on a Mercedes auto, and Kearns soon suffered a mental breakdown. After winning the Ford and Chrysler cases, Kearns moved to Maryland's Eastern Shore.

In the late 1990s, he served on the board of directors of the Veterans of the Office of Strategic Services and the General William J. Donovan Memorial Fund.

== Death and legacy ==
The story of Kearns invention and the lawsuit that resulted against Ford forms the basis of the 2008 film, Flash of Genius, where he is played by Greg Kinnear. Several family members attended the movie's premiere.

Kearns' obsessions broke down his 27-year marriage and caused distance between him and his children. His wife later remarried; she died in 2013. On February 9, 2005, in Sykesville, Maryland, Kearns died of a combination of prostate and brain cancer complicated by Alzheimer's disease. At the time of Kearns death he had two daughters, four sons and seven grandchildren.

== Patents ==
- , Robert W. Kearns, Filing date: December 1, 1964, Issue date: Nov 1967, Windshield Wiper System with Intermittent Operation
- , Robert W. Kearns, Filing date: October 18, 1967, Issue date: August 31, 1971. Intermittent Windshield Wiper System.
- , Robert W. Kearns, Timothy B. Kearns, Filing date: September 7, 1982, Issue date: October 1, 1985, Intermittent windshield wiper control system with improved motor speed
- United States Patent 3,582,747 Robert W Kearns Filing Date May 3, 1968, Issue date: June 1, 1971, Intermittent windshield wiper system with electrodynamic braking
- United States Patent 3,581,178 Robert W Kearns Filing Date April 10, 1968, Issue date: May 25, 1971, Windshield wiper control device
- 22 other patents

== Lawsuits and legal references ==
- Kearns v. Ford Motor Co., 203, U.S.P.Q. 884, 888 (E.D.Mich. 1978)
- Kearns v. Chrysler Corp., 32 F.3d 1541 (Fed. Cir. 1994)
- Kearns v. General Motors Corp., 152 F.3d 945 (Fed. Cir. 1998) (unpublished decision).
- (More lawsuits of Dr. Kearns)
