= Independent invention =

Independent invention may refer to:

- Independent inventor, a person who creates inventions independently, rather than for an employer
- Multiple discovery, the hypothesis that most scientific discoveries and inventions are made independently and more or less simultaneously by multiple scientists and inventors
