= John Seabrook =

American writer

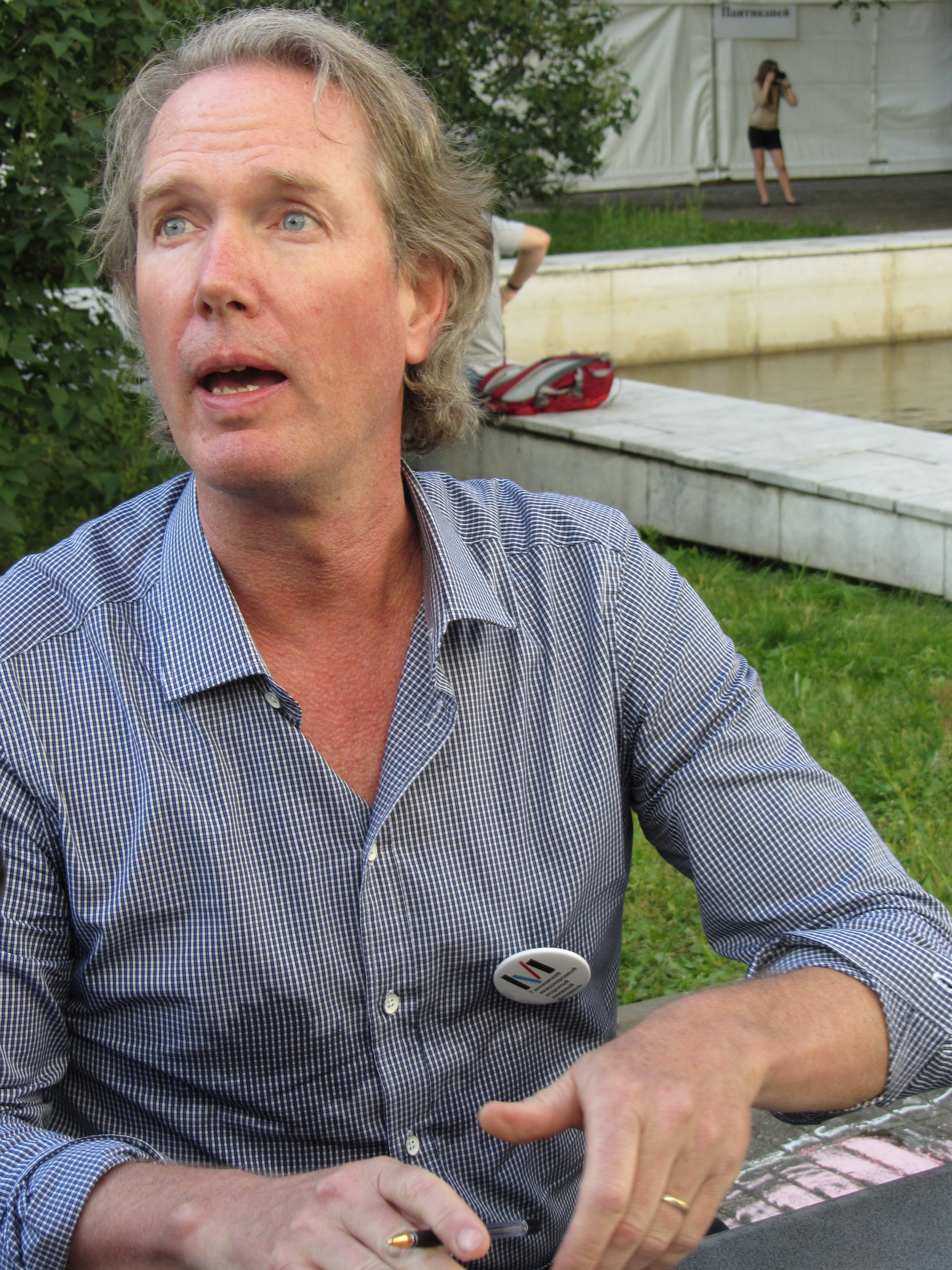
Seabrook at the 7 Moscow International Book Festival, 2012

John M. Seabrook Jr. (born January 17, 1959) is an American writer and journalist. He has worked for The New Yorker weekly magazine for many years, and has five published books.

== Biography ==
Seabrook graduated from St. Andrew's School (DE) in 1976, Princeton University in 1981 and received an M.A. in English Literature from Oxford.

He began his career writing about business and published in a wide variety of magazines and newspapers, including Manhattan, inc., Harper's, Vanity Fair, GQ, The Nation, The Village Voice, and the Christian Science Monitor. To date, he has published five books besides contributing numerous articles to The New Yorker. A feature film by Marc Abraham based on his 2008 book Flash of Genius was released on October 2008, starring Greg Kinnear. His latest book, The Spinach King: The Rise and Fall of an American Dynasty was published in 2025.

== Bibliography ==
=== Books ===
- Deeper: My Two-Year Odyssey in Cyberspace. Touchstone Books. 1997.
- Nobrow: the Culture of Marketing, the Marketing of Culture. Methuen. 2000.
- Flash of Genius and Other True Stories of Invention. St. Martin's Griffin. 2008.
- The Song Machine: Inside the Hit Factory. W. W. Norton & Company. 2015.
- The Spinach King: The Rise and Fall of an American Dynasty. W. W. Norton & Company. 2025. ISBN 978-1-324-00352-6.

=== Essays and reporting ===
- "E-mail from Bill". A Reporter at Large. The New Yorker. January 10, 1994.
- "It came from Hollywood". Dept. of Special Effects. The New Yorker. December 1, 2003.
- "Couch potato politics". The Talk of the Town. Sixty Seconds. The New Yorker. 84 (35): 46, 48. November 3, 2008. Archived from the original on November 6, 2008.
- "Peekers". The Talk of the Town. Dept. of Visitations. The New Yorker. 86 (31): 38. October 11, 2010.
- "Streaming dreams". Annals of Technology. The New Yorker. 87 (44): 24–30. January 16, 2012. Archived from the original on February 1, 2012. (Note: YouTube.)
- "Re-start". The Talk of the Town: Fountain of Youth Dept. The New Yorker. 87 (46): 20. January 30, 2012. Archived from the original on April 26, 2012. (Note: Nolan Bushnell.)
- "Glass half full". The Talk of the Town: The Musical Life. The New Yorker. 88 (38): 42. December 3, 2012. Archived from the original on October 20, 2014.
- "Tarrytown boy". The Talk of the Town. Comeback Dept. The New Yorker. 88 (45): 23. January 28, 2013. Tim Maia.
- "Caloric sounds". Talk of the Town. Have You Heard This One?. The New Yorker. 89 (3): 18, 20. March 4, 2013.
- "The Beach Builders". Our Local Correspondents. The New Yorker. 89 (21): 42–51. July 22, 2013.
- "A dog's life". The Talk of the Town. Here to There Dept. The New Yorker. 89 (30): 25. September 30, 2013.
- "Names". The Talk of the Town. Dept. of Hoopla. The New Yorker. 89 (47): 20, 22. February 3, 2014.
- "Hey, hey". The Talk of the Town. Never Say Never. The New Yorker. 90 (12): 27. May 12, 2014. (Note: Michael Nesmith.)
- "Free". The Talk of the Town. The Musical Life. The New Yorker. 90 (46): 21. February 2, 2015. (Note: Inuk throat singer Tanya Tagaq.)
- "Full reverb". The Talk of the Town. Game Night. The New Yorker. 91 (9): 33. April 20, 2015. (Note: Online version is titled "Game night with Laura Marling".)
- "Third Act". The Talk of the Town. The Musical Life. The New Yorker. 91 (14): 24–25. May 25, 2015. (Note: Title in the online table of contents is "Beyond 'Uptown Funk'".)
- "The mixologist : how Mike Will made it". Profiles. The New Yorker. 92 (21): 34–42. July 11–18, 2016.
- "My father's cellar : a lifetime of drinking". Personal History. The New Yorker. 92 (43): 22–28. January 23, 2017. (Note: Online version is titled "Behind the cellar door".)
- "High ceilings". The Talk of the Town. The Musical Life. The New Yorker. 93 (24): 17–18. August 21, 2017. (Note: Online version is titled "Randy Newman contemplates the universe".)
- "Top jocks : Puerto Rico's Ortiz brothers are lighting up New York's racetracks". The Sporting Scene. The New Yorker. 93 (39): 38–45. December 4, 2017. (Note: Online version is titled "Puerto Rico's Ortiz brothers light up horse racing".)
- "The Next Word". A Reporter at Large. The New Yorker. 95 (36): 52–63. October 14, 2019. (Note: Online version is titled "Can a Machine Learn to Write for The New Yorker?".)
- "Zero-proof therapy : can an ex-drinker return to the bar if non-alcoholic beer is on tap?". American Chronicles. The New Yorker. 97 (30): 30–36. September 27, 2021. (Note: Online version is titled "An ex-drinker’s search for a sober buzz".)
- "The Flood Will Come : How to think about the formidable power of rivers." Annals of Disaster. The New Yorker. 101 (21): 12-18. July 28, 2025.

=== Critical studies and reviews of Seabrook's work ===
Nobrow

- Foster, Hal (21 September 2000). "Slumming with rappers at the Roxy". London Review of Books. 22 (18): 16–18. (Note: For comparison, see Peter Swirski's textbook on nobrow taste culture in America, From Lowbrow to Nobrow.)

The song machine

- Nathaniel Rich. "Hit Charade". The Atlantic (October 2015).

———————
