= Kayla Nguyen =

American physicist

Kayla X. Nguyen
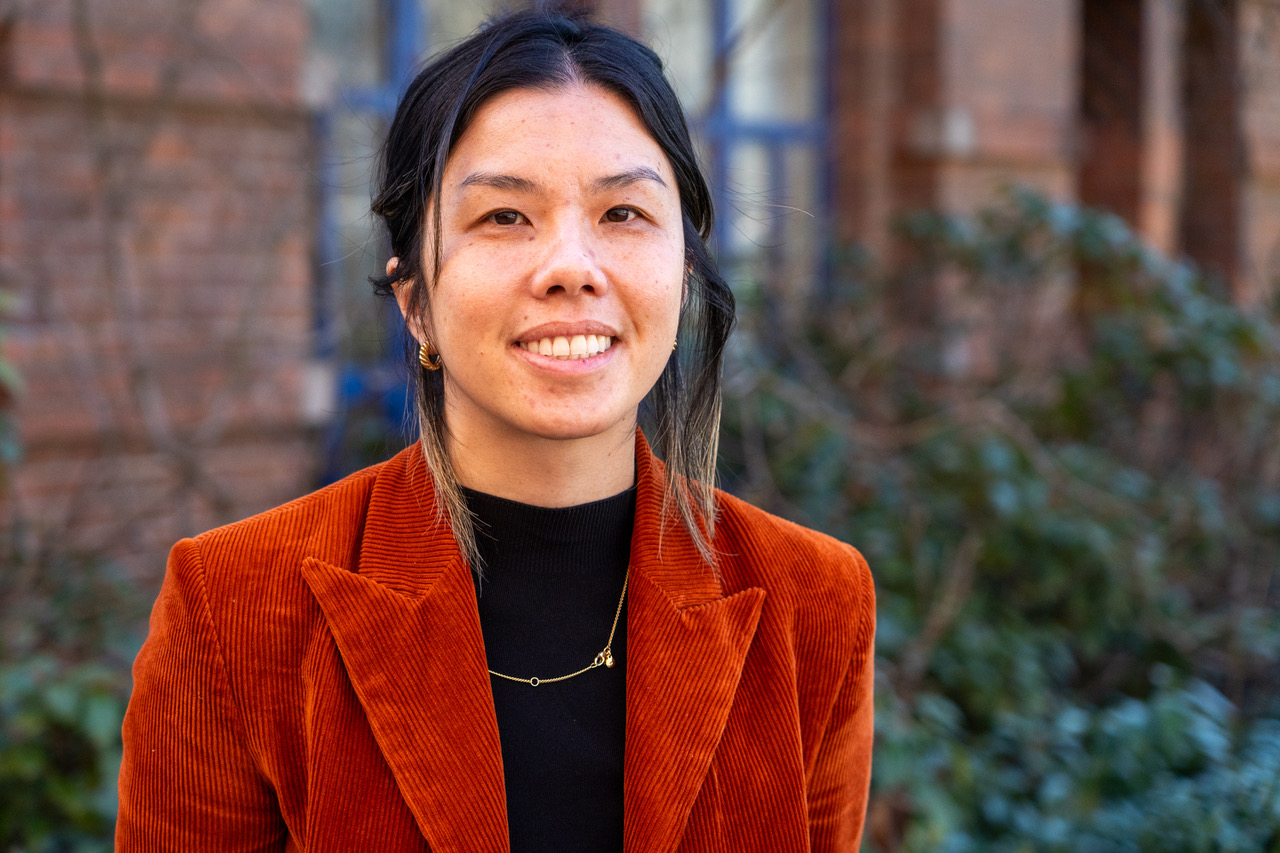
- Born: 1989 (age 36–37); Vietnam
- Education: University of California at Santa Barbara; Cornell University
- Known for: Co-inventor of Electron Microscope Pixel Array Detector (EMPAD)
- Scientific career
- Fields: Physics; Chemical Physics
- Workplaces: University of Illinois at Urbana-Champaign; University of Oregon
- Thesis: New imaging capabilities for materials enabled by the Electron Microscope Pixel Array Detector (EMPAD) (2018)
- Doctoral advisor: David A. Muller

Kayla X. Nguyen (born 1989) is a physicist and assistant professor on the faculty of the University of Oregon. She co-invented the Electron Microscope Pixel Array Detector (EMPAD), a camera displaying images at a very high level of detail. Her research involves computational tools and instrumentation to visualize and measure individual atoms.

== Early life and education ==
Kayla Nguyen was born in Vietnam in 1989, and was four years old when her family immigrated to the United States from a refugee camp in Thailand. At age nine, she was inspired when she heard Sally Ride speak at an event encouraging "more women and girls to pursue careers in STEM".

As a teen in Southern California, she worked in a skateboard shop, where her customers asked for boards with better features: "..more pop, for example, or better bearings", eventually leading her to "develop an intuition for physics". When she surfed, she took note of "the energy and motion of the waves", building her interest in the way things work.

At the College of Creative Studies of the University of California at Santa Barbara, Nguyen completed a B.S. in physics. Her honors thesis, Electrostatic Force Microscopy on Organic Photovoltaics, was advised by Thuc-Quyen Nguyen.

While a graduate student at Cornell University, Nguyen won the Lemelson–MIT Prize competition as co-inventor of the Electron Microscope Pixel Array Detector (EMPAD), a camera that "takes pictures using electrons and can detect and display them at an unprecedented level of detail". She earned a Ph.D. at Cornell with her dissertation, New imaging capabilities for materials enabled by the Electron Microscope Pixel Array Detector (EMPAD), advised by David A. Muller.

== Career ==
During her post-doc at the University of Illinois at Urbana-Champaign from 2019–2023, Nguyen was named by The Japan Times as one of "Five pioneering Asian scientists to look out for this year". The article reported, "Nguyen's research has the potential to improve medicine and technology with new treatments for cancer and possible cures for Alzheimer's. It can enhance drug delivery systems, make fuel-cell cars more accessible and quicken computer processing, among other things."

Since 2023, Nguyen has held an assistant professorship in the University of Oregon Department of Physics. Nguyen's research involves physics, materials science and computer science, focusing on the next generation of electron microscope technology, including computational tools and instrumentation to visualize and measure individual atoms. She has said, "When you design detectors, microscopes or new computational frameworks, you're really designing new ways to look at the microscopic world... Once you have the tool, anyone — biologists, chemists, physicists — can use it to ask their own questions."

== Honors and awards ==
- Maria Goeppert-Mayer Award (2026) American Physical Society citation: For pioneering contributions to electron microscopy, including the co-invention of the electron microscope pixel array detector, imaging of negative capacitance in topological ferroelectrics, advances in electron ptychography, and efforts to democratize science.
- Beckman Young Investigators Award (2025)
- L'Oréal For Women in Science (2020)
- Illinois Distinguished Postdoctoral Fellow (2019)
- Lemelson–MIT Student Prize winner (2018)

== Selected publications ==
- Yu, Yue; Spoth, Katherine A.; Colletta, Michael; Nguyen, Kayla X.; Zeltmann, Steven E.; Zhang, Xiyue S.; Paraan, Mohammadreza; Kopylov, Mykhailo; Dubbeldam, Charlie; Serwas, Daniel; Siems, Hannah; Muller, David A.; Kourkoutis, Lena F. (October 2025). "Dose-efficient cryo-electron microscopy for thick samples using tilt- corrected scanning transmission electron microscopy". Nature Methods. 22 (10): 2138–2148. doi:10.1038/s41592-025-02834-9. ISSN 1548-7105. PMC 12510875.
- Nguyen, Kayla X.; Jiang, Yi; Lee, Chia-Hao; Kharel, Priti; Zhang, Yue; van der Zande, Arend M.; Huang, Pinshane Y. (February 23, 2024). "Achieving sub-0.5-angstrom–resolution ptychography in an uncorrected electron microscope". Science. 383 (6685): 865–870. doi:10.1126/science.adl2029.
- Nguyen, K. X.; Jiang, Y.; Cao, M. C.; Purohit, P.; Yadav, A. K.; García-Fernández, P.; Tate, M. W.; Chang, C. S.; Aguado-Puente, P.; Íñiguez, J.; Gomez-Ortiz, F.; Gruner, S. M.; Junquera, J.; Martin, L. W.; Ramesh, R. (May 26, 2023). "Transferring orbital angular momentum to an electron beam reveals toroidal and chiral order". Physical Review B. 107 (20). doi:10.1103/PhysRevB.107.205419. hdl:10902/31590. ISSN 2469-9950. Archived from the original on September 6, 2024.
- Nguyen, Kayla X.; Huang, Jeffrey; Karigerasi, Manohar H.; Kang, Kisung; Cahill, David G.; Zuo, Jian-Min; Schleife, André; Shoemaker, Daniel P.; Huang, Pinshane Y. (May 1, 2023). "Angstrom-scale imaging of magnetization in antiferromagnetic Fe2As via 4D-STEM". Ultramicroscopy. 247 113696. arXiv:2211.10423. doi:10.1016/j.ultramic.2023.113696. ISSN 0304-3991.
- Chen, Zhen; Turgut, Emrah; Jiang, Yi; Nguyen, Kayla X.; Stolt, Matthew J.; Jin, Song; Ralph, Daniel C.; Fuchs, Gregory D.; Muller, David A. (November 2022). "Lorentz electron ptychography for imaging magnetic textures beyond the diffraction limit". Nature Nanotechnology. 17 (11): 1165–1170. doi:10.1038/s41565-022-01224-y. ISSN 1748-3395.
- Nguyen, Kayla X.; Zhang, Xiyue S.; Turgut, Emrah; Cao, Michael C.; Glaser, Jack; Chen, Zhen; Stolt, Matthew J.; Chang, Celesta S.; Shao, Yu-Tsun; Jin, Song; Fuchs, Gregory D.; Muller, David A. (March 28, 2022). "Disentangling Magnetic and Grain Contrast in Polycrystalline Fe Ge Thin Films Using Four-Dimensional Lorentz Scanning Transmission Electron Microscopy". Physical Review Applied. 17 (3). arXiv:2001.06900. doi:10.1103/PhysRevApplied.17.034066. ISSN 2331-7019.

== See also ==
- Computational microscopy
