= Independent inventor =

Person who creates inventions not meant for the employer

An independent inventor is a person who creates inventions independently, rather than for an employer.

Many independent inventors patent their inventions so that they have rights over them, and hope to earn income from selling or licensing them. Usually inventions made in the course of employment are ultimately owned by the employer; this is often specified in the terms of employment. Other inventors (independent or corporate) may create inventions hoped to be of use to anybody, and place them in the public domain.

== Notable post-1950 independent inventors ==
- Robert Kearns, inventor of a type of intermittent windscreen wiper, who successfully sued Ford and Chrysler, and whose story was dramatized in the film Flash of Genius
- Jerome H. Lemelson, who claimed to have invented technology used in bar code readers, and eventually lost his patent rights as a result of pursuing a so-called submarine strategy for his patent applications
- Peter Roberts, inventor of a quick-release socket wrench, who sold his patent to Sears and then successfully claimed the company owed him more because they had misrepresented their market estimates in negotiations
- Ron Hickman of Jersey, inventor of a portable workbench turned down by several tool companies with comments such as that it would sell in the dozens rather than hundreds; he started selling it direct to professional builders. Several companies produced unlicensed imitations, as is normal to challenge a patent; Hickman successfully defended his patents in court. Black & Decker started producing the workbench in 1973 as the Black & Decker Workmate, paying Hickman a royalty; it had sold about 30 million worldwide by the time of Hickman's death in 2011.
- Brazilian Alfredo Moser invented a way of illuminating a house during the day without electricity, using plastic bottles inserted through the roof, of benefit to people with few resources living in simple dwellings. The idea was taken up in about 15 countries, and it was expected that over a million would have been installed by the start of 2014. Moser was very happy that his lamp, which he did not patent, was taken up in such a big way.

== Organizations ==
- Alliance for American Innovation

== See also ==
- Employment contract
