= Elizabeth Hausler =

Elizabeth Ann Hausler
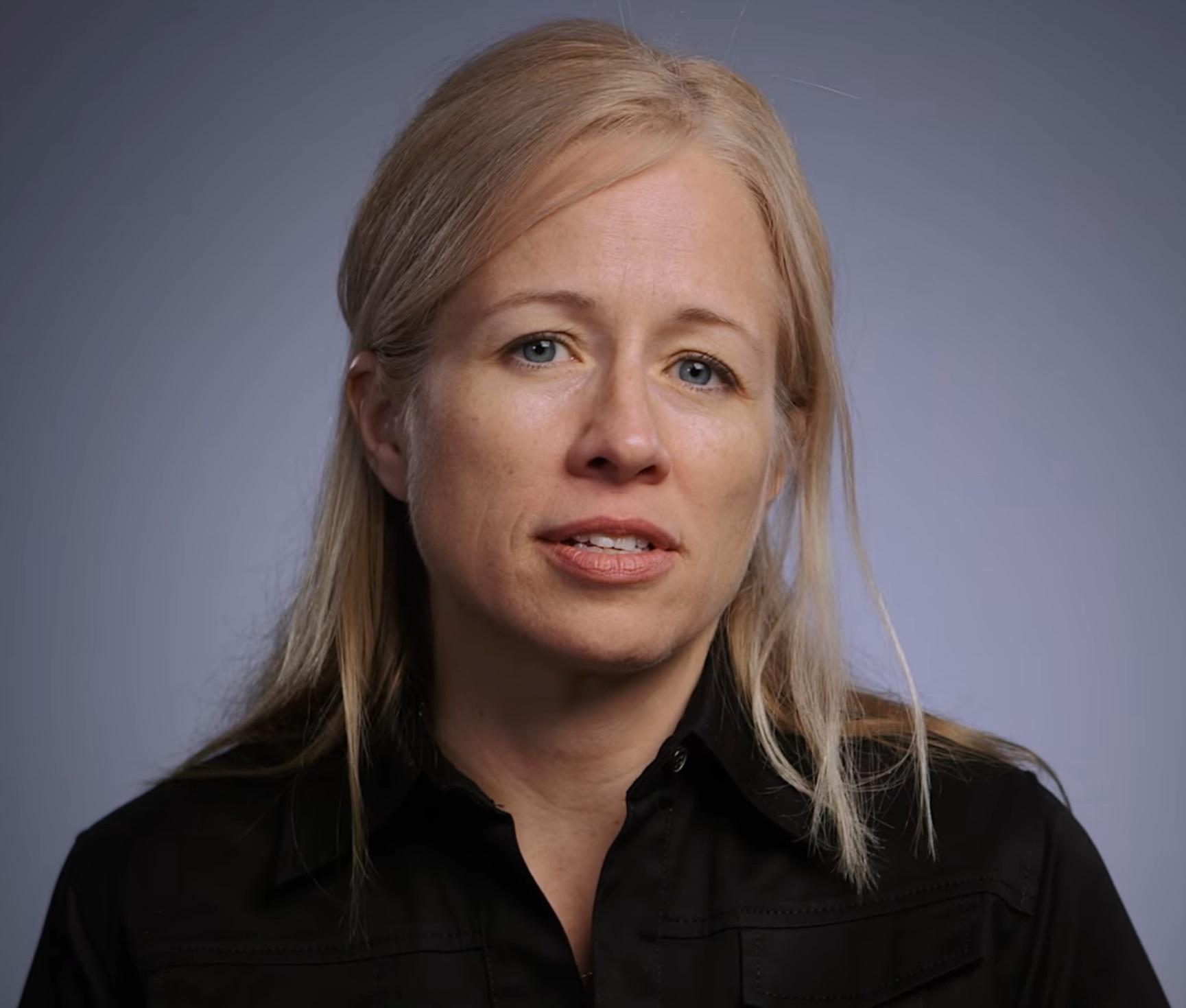
- Hausler in 2015
- Born: 13 January 1969 (age 57); Aurora, Illinois U.S.
- Education: University of California, Berkeley; University of Colorado, Denver; University of Illinois at Urbana-Champaign
- Occupations: Civil Engineer, Social Entrepreneur, CEO
- Known for: Founder of Build Change

Elizabeth Hausler is the founder and CEO of Build Change, and a global expert on resilient housing, post-disaster reconstruction, and systems change. She is a social entrepreneur and a skilled brick, block, and stonemason.

== Early life ==
Hausler grew up in Plano, Illinois. Her father owned a small business in masonry construction, building custom houses and lightweight industrial buildings. As a child she enjoyed playing with Lincoln Logs. She worked summers with her father as a bricklayer, who encouraged Hausler and her sister to study engineering.

== Education and early career ==
Hausler majored in General Engineering (now Industrial & Enterprise Systems Engineering) in the Grainger College of Engineering at the University of Illinois at Urbana–Champaign. Following her graduation, Hausler worked as a management consultant at Peterson Consulting in Chicago (later Navigant Consulting) on cases involving insurance coverage for cleanup at municipal solid waste disposal sites.

After an interlude skiing in Steamboat Springs, Colorado, she attended the University of Colorado, Denver for her master's degree in environmental science, while working on landfill design and environmental site assessments for Dames & Moore.

She later attended the University of California, Berkeley and completed a Master's and Ph.D. in Civil Engineering. During this time, Hausler developed an increased interest in the effects of earthquakes on the built environment. The September 11 attacks reinforced Hausler's desire to use engineering to save lives. In 2002, Hausler defended her thesis, "Influence of ground improvement on settlement and liquefaction: A study based on field case history evidence and dynamic geotechnical centrifuge tests". It considered the 1964 Niigata earthquake, the Great Hanshin earthquake and the 1999 İzmit earthquake.

Later that year, Hausler was awarded a Fulbright Fellowship and moved to India to study and assist with housing reconstruction after the 2001 earthquake near Bhuj, in Gujarat. She spent time in Iran after the 2003 Bam earthquake, and returned to India to evaluate how construction had adapted following the 1993 Latur earthquake and 1999 Chamoli earthquakes. Based on these field observations, Hausler became aware of difficulties with traditional donor-driven reconstruction approaches, which do not take climate, culture, or homeowner preferences into account. She noted that some of the new houses built with international aid following disasters were not resistant to further earthquakes.

Local homeowners, she found, wanted to be at the center of the reconstruction process of their home, and preferred an approach where they were given conditional cash plus technical assistance rather than a free house that didn't meet their preferences and needs.

== Work with Build Change ==
Hausler applied for an Echoing Green Fellowship in 2004 and founded Build Change. Build Change is headquartered in Denver, and saves lives in earthquakes and windstorms by constructing disaster-resilient homes and schools. Through a combination of engineering, technology, financing and policy solutions, Build Change puts the homeowner at the center of the redesign process of their home.

As of the end of 2019, Build Change had reached nearly 500,000 people with a safer home, training, or a job, and worked in 24 countries.

Build Change's first project was partnering with Mercy Corps to build homes that could resist disasters after the 2004 Indian Ocean earthquake and tsunami.

In 2009, Hausler was named an Ashoka Fellow.

The next year, Hausler and Build Change responded to the 2010 Haiti earthquake, a country where the organization would remain active for the next decade. Today, more than 7,200 people in Haiti are living in permanent, earthquake-resilient homes due to Build Change's work.

In 2011, Hausler was awarded a $100,000 Lemelson–MIT Prize that allowed her to train more engineers, laborers, and government officials in Haiti on resilient building.

Over the next several years, Build Change continued to respond post-disaster, while also increasingly working to prevent loss of life and property pre-disaster by proactively strengthening homes and schools. Build Change entered several countries, (like the Philippines, following Typhoon Haiyan) in a post-disaster capacity, while also starting a prevention program to make the country more resilient.

In 2015, Build Change responded to the Gorkha Earthquake in Nepal, launching the organization's largest post-disaster effort to date, in the process protecting more than 120,000 people.

In recognition of Hausler's leadership, Build Change was awarded a $1.25 million Skoll Award for Social Entrepreneurship in 2017.

In 2018, Hausler and Build Change went on to play a lead role in the creation of the Global Program for Resilient Housing at The World Bank. The goal of the program is to identify the communities most at risk of disaster, and to strengthen the homes in those communities using a "build better before" approach.

In recent years, Hausler has increased her policy advocacy for climate-smart, disaster-resilient housing. She has pushed for resilience to play a bigger role on the global development agenda at the World Economic Forum, The World Bank, and the Clinton Global Initiative.

On September 18, 2018, Hausler delivered a TED Talk as a part of 'We The Future', an event hosted by the Skoll Foundation and the UN Foundation. The theme of her talk was "How to Build Back Safer After Disaster".

On International Women's Day 2019, Hausler spoke alongside Lorraine Twohill, Chief Marketing Officer of Google and Kiara Nirghin at the UN's official observance of the day.

At the Skoll World Forum in March 2019, Hausler participated on a panel on the topic of "AI for Good".

That same summer, Hausler delivered the commencement address for the University of California, Berkeley's Graduate College of Engineering, her alma mater.

In August, 2019, she was featured in a Freethink video titled, "Could We End Earthquake and Hurricane Deaths?"

Also in 2019, Hausler was one of the featured keynotes at Autodesk University-Las Vegas, where she shared how Build Change has used technology to scale the earthquake recovery in Nepal.

In April, 2020, Hausler commented in Forbes that "...issues of substandard housing are exacerbating this [COVID-19] pandemic...So how is the world's view of housing, and the importance of decent, disaster-resilient housing, going to change?"

== Selected Awards and Honors ==
2025 Member of the National Academy of Engineering

2019 Inaugural Global Engineering Professional Award, Mortenson Center for Global Engineering, University of Colorado at Boulder

2018 University of California, Berkeley Campanile Excellence in Achievement Award

2018 IBM Call for Code Runner Up (with Build Change)

2017 Skoll Award for Social Entrepreneurship (with Build Change)

2017 Curry Stone Design Prize honors Build Change as a member of the Social Design Circle

2014 Academy of Distinguished Alumni of University of California, Berkeley

2013 Kappa Kappa Gamma Alumnae Achievement Award

2013 Structural Engineers Association of Northern California Award of Excellence in Structural Engineering

2011 Schwab Foundation for Social Entrepreneurship US Social Entrepreneur of the Year

2011 Lemelson–MIT Prize for Sustainability

2009 Ashoka-Lemelson Fellow

2008 The Tech Awards Laureate

2006 Draper Richards Kaplan Fellow

2006 ABC News World News Tonight “Person of the Week”

2004 Echoing Green Fellowship
