= Joel Selanikio =

American physician

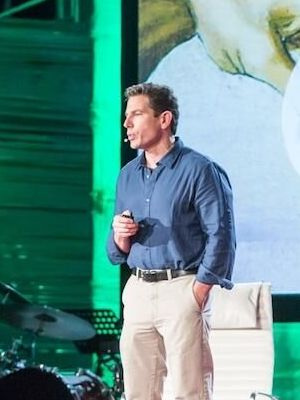
- Joel Selanikio at TEDxAustin in 2013
- Citizenship: American
- Education: Haverford College; Brown University Medical School
- Awards: Lemelson–MIT Prize
- Scientific career
- Fields: Physician
- Workplaces: Magpi

Joel Selanikio is an American physician, attending pediatrician, and assistant professor of pediatrics at Georgetown University Hospital.

== Education ==
Selanikio graduated from Haverford College, Philadelphia, in 1986. He then started to work for Chase Manhattan as a systems analyst. He also completed a degree in medicine at Brown University and settled in Atlanta, Georgia.

== Career ==
After his residency in Atlanta, Selanikio started to work for the Centers for Disease Control and Prevention. He then left his job to start DataDyne.org, a company that made open-source software for collecting data on public health.

After the 2004 Indian Ocean earthquake and tsunami, Selanikio worked with the International Rescue Committee in Aceh, Indonesia. During the 2014-2015 Ebola epidemic in Sierra Leone, he worked with the International Medical Corps in Lunsar.

== Presentations ==
- TED (2013)
- Ivey Global Health Conference (2013)
- Royal Society of Medicine Lecture (2011)
- World Economic Forum “Tech for Society” Panel, Davos (2010)
- Lemelson-MIT Innovation Prize Lecture (2009)

== Recognition ==
- ComputerWorld 21st Century Achievement Award (2012)
- Fast Company Magazine Social Enterprise of the Year (2009)
- Wall Street Journal Award for Technological Innovation in Healthcare (2009)
- Lemelson-MIT Prize $100,000 Award for Sustainable Innovation (2009)
- Tech Museum Award for Health (2008)
- Stockholm Challenge (2008)
- Haverford College Award (2005)
