= Jerome H. Lemelson =

American engineer and inventor (1923–1997)

Jerry Lemelson
- Born: Jerome Hal Lemelson; July 18, 1923; Staten Island, New York
- Died: October 1, 1997 (aged 74); Los Angeles, California
- Education: New York University
- Occupations: inventor, businessman
- Known for: prolific inventor

Jerome "Jerry" Hal Lemelson (July 18, 1923 – October 1, 1997) was an American engineer, inventor, and patent holder. Several of his inventions relate to warehouses, industrial robots, cordless telephones, fax machines, videocassette recorders, camcorders, and the magnetic tape drive. Lemelson's 605 patents made him one of the most prolific inventors in American history.

Lemelson was an advocate for the rights of independent inventors; he served on a federal advisory committee on patent issues from 1976 to 1979. A series of patent litigations and subsequent licensing negotiations made him a controversial figure, seen as staunch supporter for the rights of independent inventors, while criticized by patent attorneys and directors of some of the companies with whom he was involved in litigation.

In 1993, Lemelson and his family established the Lemelson Foundation, a philanthropy with the mission to support invention and innovation to improve lives in the United States and developing countries.

== Biography ==
Lemelson was born on Staten Island, New York, on July 18, 1923, the oldest of three brothers. His father was a physician of Austrian-Jewish descent. His first invention, as a child, was for a lighted tongue depressor that his father, a local physician, could use. He also ran a business in his basement as a teenager, making and selling gas-powered model airplanes.

He attended New York University after serving during World War II in the United States Army Air Corps engineering department. His experience with teaching African American engineers, in segregated units in the Army, led to a lifelong interest in civil rights and in particular promoting the education of minority engineering students.

After the war he received two master's degrees: in aeronautical as well as industrial engineering. He worked for the Office of Naval Research on Project SQUID, a postwar effort to develop pulse jet and rocket engines and then Republic Aviation, designing guided missiles. After taking a job as a safety engineer at a smelting plant in New Jersey, he quit because he claimed the company would not implement safety improvements Lemelson believed could save lives. This was his last job before becoming an independent inventor.

Lemelson's first major invention involved utilizing a universal robot, for use in a variety of industrial systems, that could do numerous actions such as welding, moving and measuring products, and utilized optical image technology to scan for flaws in the production line. He wrote a 150-page application which he submitted for his first patent, on what he termed "machine vision", in 1954. Parts of these automated warehousing systems he licensed to the Triax Corporation in 1964.

During the 1950s, he also worked on systems for video filing of data utilizing magnetic tape or videotape to record documents, which could be read either on a monitor or from stop frame images. This process, along with mechanisms to control and manipulate the tape, were later licensed to Sony in 1974 for use in both audio and video cassette players. During this period, he also worked on a series of patents developing aspects of data and word processing technologies. He licensed twenty of these patents to IBM in 1981. IBM offered him a position running one of their research divisions, which Lemelson declined because he wanted to remain an independent inventor. He also developed a series of patents on the manufacturing of integrated circuits, which he licensed to Texas Instruments in 1961. While working during this period on complex industrial products, ranging across the fields of robotics, lasers, computers, and electronics, Lemelson utilized some of the concepts in these more "high tech" areas and applied them to a variety of toy concepts, receiving patents for velcro target games, wheeled toys, board games, and improvements on the classic propeller beanie, among others. An exhibit of his toy inventions was shown in 2012 at the Smithsonian National Museum of American History.

This cross-pollination across disparate fields was typical for Lemelson, and can be seen in how he devised ideas and patents for new ways of making semiconductors. While watching and reading about the problems with the heating and subsequent oxidation on heat shields of rockets re-entering the Earth's atmosphere, Lemelson realized that this same process could operate on the molecular level when electrical resistance in a silicon wafer creates an insulative barrier and thus provides for more efficient conduction of electric current.

From 1957 on, he worked exclusively as an independent inventor. From this period onwards, Lemelson received an average of one patent a month for more than 40 years, in technological fields related to automated warehouses, industrial robots, cordless telephones, fax machines, videocassette recorders, illuminated highway markers, camcorders and a magnetic tape drive. As an independent inventor, Lemelson wrote, sketched, and filed almost all of his patent applications himself, with little help from outside counsel.

Lemelson was described as a "workaholic", spending 12 to 14 hours a day writing up his ideas, and often as much as 18 hours a day tinkering. His notebooks holding these ideas numbered in the thousands. Lemelson's younger brother said that when they were roommates in college, after they would go to sleep, the light would go on several times during the night and Lemelson would write something down. In the morning, Lemelson's brother would read and witness the several inventions that Lemelson had conceived that previous night. His brother stated, "This happened every night, seven days a week".

Lemelson died in 1997, after a one-year battle with liver cancer. In the final year of his life, he applied for over 40 patents, many of them in the biomedical field related to cancer detection and treatment, including a "Computerized medical diagnostic system" (U.S. patent 5,878,746) and several "Medical devices using electrosensitive gels," all issuing posthumously. In 2009, 12 years after his death, U.S. patent 7,602,947, for a "Facial-recognition vehicle security system," was issued in Lemelson's name.

Lemelson was a staunch advocate for the rights of independent inventors. He served on a federal advisory committee on patent issues from 1976 to 1979. In this capacity, he advocated for a variety of issues, including protecting the secrecy of patent applications and advocating for the "first to invent" patent system. In his testimony before the Patent Trademark Office Advisory Committee, he decried what he believed as an "innovation crisis", and that the barriers, such as high legal and filing costs as well as failures of the courts to protect the rights of independent inventors, were creating a negative environment for American inventors and US technological ascendancy.

== Patents and litigation ==
Lemelson was granted more than 600 patents, making him one of the 20th century's most prolific patent grantees.

Through much of his later career, Lemelson was involved in a series of patent litigations and subsequent licensing negotiations. As a result, he was both excoriated by his legal opponents and hailed as a hero by many independent inventors. For example, Lemelson claimed he had invented the "flexible track" used in the popular "Hot Wheels" toys manufactured by Mattel. In the 1980s Lemelson sued for willful patent infringement, from which he initially won a substantial judgement in a jury trial. This case was later overturned on appeal. Later that same year, Lemelson won a $17 million judgement against Illinois Tool Works for infringement on a robot tool spraying device, which was upheld on appeal.

Lemelson litigated extensively on the basis of what he termed his "machine vision" patents, the earliest of which dates from the mid-1950s. These patents described scanning visual data from a camera, which are then stored in a computer. Combining with robotic devices and bar coders, this technology could be used to check, manipulate, or evaluate the products moving down an assembly line. Items or products could then be adjusted or sent on to different parts of a factory for further procedures. Lemelson also sued a variety of Japanese and European automotive and electronics manufacturers for infringing on his machine vision patents. Lemelson and these companies reached a settlement, with the companies taking a license to the patents, in 1990-1991.

Lemelson later utilized this strategy in attempting to reach settlements over alleged patent infringement with American companies. He first sued, then negotiated and received royalties from a variety of corporations. He was controversial for his alleged use of submarine patents to negotiate licenses worth over $1.3 billion from major corporations in a variety of industries. Partially as a result of his filing a succession of continuation applications, a number of his patents (particularly those in the field of industrial machine vision) were delayed, in some cases by several decades. This had the effect of taking the industry by surprise when the patents in question finally issued. Lemelson's tactics effectively resulted in these industries growing and flourishing without being aware of the impending patent-infringement lawsuits. This effectively translated into large, highly profitable lawsuit targets.

Lemelson claimed that the bureaucracy of the US Patent Office was also responsible for the long delays. The courts, in the Symbol and Cognex case discussed below, however found that Lemelson had engaged in "culpable neglect" and noted that "Lemelson patents occupied the top thirteen positions for the longest prosecutions from 1914 to 2001." However, they found no convincing evidence of inequitable conduct. Indeed, Lemelson always claimed that he followed all the rules and regulations of the United States Patent Office.

In 2004, Lemelson's estate was defeated in a notable court case involving Symbol Technologies and Cognex Corporation, which sought (and received) a ruling that 76 claims under Lemelson's machine vision patents were unenforceable. The plaintiff companies, with the support of dozens of industry supporters, spent millions on this case. The ruling was upheld on September 9, 2005 by a three judge panel of the U.S. Court of Appeals for the Federal Circuit under the doctrine of laches, citing "unreasonably long […] delays in prosecution". Lemelson's estate appealed for a review by the full circuit en banc. On November 16, 2005, the full court declined to review the case, and, citing "prejudice to the public as a whole," extended the original unenforceability ruling to all claims under the patents in question. However, the judge also ruled that Cognex and Symbol did not demonstrate that Lemelson had "intentionally stalled" getting the patents. Lemelson himself always denied intentionally stalling the patent application process, and asserted that he attempted for many years to get companies interested in his ideas, only to be rejected by what he termed the "not invented here" response. Indeed, although Lemelson died in 1997, uncontested patents he had applied for were still being issued as late as 2005-2006, such as his patent titled "Superconducting electrical cable" (U.S. patent 6,951,985) which was applied for in May 1995, but only issued in October 2005.

As a result of such cases, US lawmakers were urged to revise patent law to constrain inventors who emerge after an extended period of time demanding large licensing fees. Under current US law (35 U.S.C. 122 and 37 C.F.R. 1.211), revised by Congress in 1999, most patent applications are published 18 months after being received and any resulting patents expire 20 years after the filing date, serving to limit surprise or "submarine" patents. Lemelson's applications were submitted under older rules, which kept the application confidential during patent prosecution.

== Honors ==
Lemelson, named Engineer of the Year by readers of Design News in 1995, made many millions in uncontested licenses with a number of the world's most successful companies including IBM and Sony, among others. In 1995, Lemelson received the Golden Plate Award of the American Academy of Achievement. On Thomas Edison's birthday in 1998, the John Templeton Foundation, which recognizes "the incalculable power of the human mind," made a posthumous award.

== Lemelson Foundation ==
The Lemelson Foundation is a private IRC 501(c)(3) philanthropic organization founded in 1993 by Jerome Lemelson and his wife Dorothy.

== See also ==
- Gerald D. Hosier was the main attorney for Jerome Lemelson.
- Independent inventor
- Patent troll
- Archives at Smithsonian's National Museum of American History

== General and cited references ==
- Hansen, Susan (March 2004). "Breaking the (Bar) Code. The fabled Lemelson patents won't scan anymore. How Jesse Jenner brought down a billion dollar licensing empire." (PDF), IP Law & Business
- Heinze, William F. (May 2002). "Dead Patents Walking: Loopholes in the patent process exploited by Jerome Lemelson, one of the most prolific inventors of all time, may be finally closing in on him". IEEE Spectrum. Volume 39, no. 5. pp. 52–54. doi:10.1109/6.999797.
- Maloney, Lawrence D. (March 1995). "Lone Wolf of the Sierras", Design News
- Petroski, Henry "An Independent Inventor", American Scientist, May 1998
- Riordan, Teresa (April 26, 2004). "Patents; The Lemelson Foundation, named for a prolific inventor, aims to reward inventions that help poor countries develop" (subscription required). The New York Times
- Siegel, Robert P. (Winter 2005). "As Patent Laws Weaken Innovation Suffers", Strategy+Business
- Varchaver, Nicholas (May 14, 2001). "The Patent King", Fortune magazine
- "Lemelson-MIT winner stripped of prize", VooDoo, Spring 2002, MIT, Vol. 5, no. 1, p. 10 (satirical magazine)
