= Heme ligase =

Identifiers
- EC no.: 4.99.1.8

Databases
- IntEnz: IntEnz view
- BRENDA: BRENDA entry
- ExPASy: NiceZyme view
- KEGG: KEGG entry
- MetaCyc: metabolic pathway
- PRIAM: profile
- PDB structures: RCSB PDB PDBe PDBsum
Search
- PMC: articles
- PubMed: articles
- NCBI: proteins

Heme ligase (EC 4.99.1.8, heme detoxification protein, HDP, hemozoin synthase) is an enzyme with systematic name Fe^{3+}:ferriprotoporphyrin IX ligase (β-hematin-forming). This enzyme catalyses the following reaction:

2 ferriprotoporphyrin IX $\rightleftharpoons$ beta-hematin

This heme detoxifying enzyme is found in Plasmodium parasites.
