= Greg Kinnear =

American actor (born 1963)

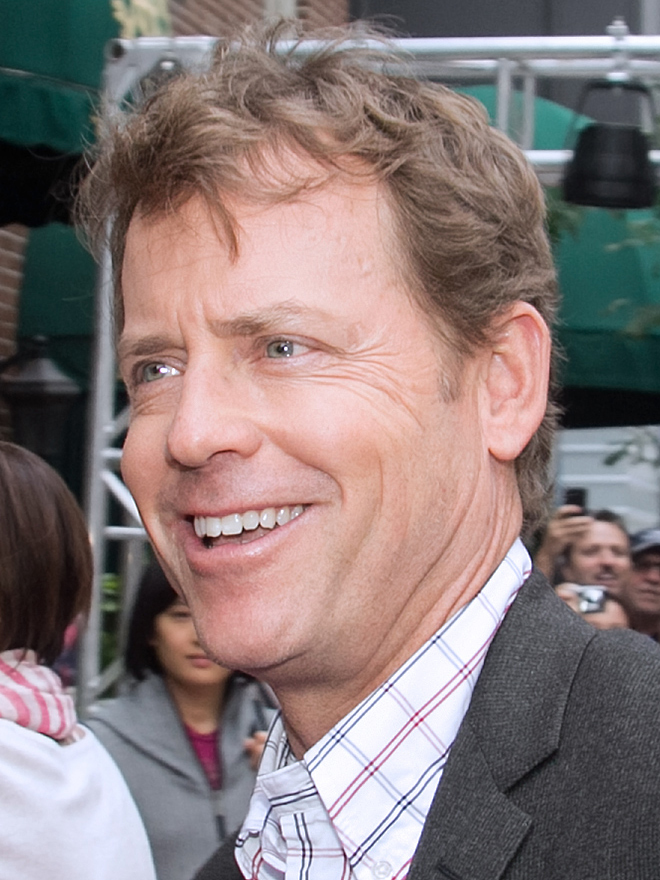
- Kinnear at the 2012 Toronto International Film Festival
- Born: Gregory Buck Kinnear; June 17, 1963 (age 63); Logansport, Indiana, U.S.
- Education: University of Arizona
- Occupation: Actor
- Years active: 1988–present
- Spouse: Helen Labdon (m. 1999)
- Children: 3

Gregory Buck Kinnear (born June 17, 1963) is an American actor and former talk show host. He was nominated for an Academy Award for Best Supporting Actor for his role in As Good as It Gets (1997).

Kinnear has appeared in many popular films, including Sabrina (1995), You've Got Mail (1998), Nurse Betty (2000), Someone like You (2001), We Were Soldiers, Auto Focus (both 2002), Stuck on You (2003), Robots (2005), Little Miss Sunshine, Invincible (both 2006), Green Zone, The Last Song (both 2010), Heaven Is for Real (2014), and Misbehaviour (2020). His television roles include Friends, Talk Soup, Modern Family, House of Cards, Rake, and the miniseries The Stand (2020). Kinnear portrayed John F. Kennedy in The Kennedys (2011), and Joe Biden in Confirmation (2016).

== Early life ==
Kinnear was born on June 17, 1963, in Logansport, Indiana, to Suzanne (née Buck), a homemaker, and Edward Kinnear, a career diplomat who worked for the US State Department. He has two older brothers, James (born 1957) and Steven (born 1959). He is of Scots-Irish descent. Kinnear grew up a "Foreign Service brat", having moved around frequently, from Beirut to Athens. While a student at the American Community Schools in Athens, Kinnear first ventured into the role of talk show host with his radio show School Daze With Greg Kinnear. Returning to the United States for a university education, he attended the University of Arizona, graduating in 1985 with a degree in broadcast journalism. While there, he was a member of the Alpha Tau Omega fraternity.

== Career ==
Kinnear hosted a short-lived game show, College Mad House, which was spun off from the kids' show Fun House. He became the creator, co-executive producer and host of The Best of the Worst, which aired from 1991 to 1992. In 1991, Kinnear became the first host of Talk Soup, which he hosted until 1995, when he left the show for the NBC late-night talk show Later with Greg Kinnear (1994).

After his film debut, Blankman, Kinnear won the part of David Larrabee in Sydney Pollack's 1995 remake of Billy Wilder's 1954 classic Sabrina. He played the lead role in the 1996 comedy Dear God. In 1997, he was cast in James L. Brooks' comedy-drama As Good as It Gets, and received a nomination for the Academy Award for Best Supporting Actor. He also starred in A Smile Like Yours with Lauren Holly, as part of a couple trying to have a baby. His next film was the popular You've Got Mail as Kathleen's (Meg Ryan) significant other. Other films are Mystery Men, Nurse Betty, Loser, The Gift and Someone Like You. Kinnear often alternated roles, often playing good guys like a righteous principal in The Gift or a gay painter in As Good as It Gets, to bad guys such as a sleazy college professor in Loser, a womanizer in Someone Like You as well as Sabrina and an egotistical soap opera star in Nurse Betty.

In 2002, Kinnear starred in Auto Focus about the life and murder of actor Bob Crane. Kinnear portrayed Crane. In 2003, he starred in the comedy Stuck on You, with Matt Damon as a conjoined twin who pursues his dream of becoming a Hollywood actor in spite of his joined brother's desire for a different kind of life. In 2005, he starred in the black comedy The Matador with Pierce Brosnan and voiced Phineas T. Ratchet in the animated film Robots. Kinnear co-starred with Steve Carell in the Oscar-winning comedy-drama Little Miss Sunshine in 2006, and with Mark Wahlberg in Invincible, based on the true story of a bartender who tries out for the Philadelphia Eagles football team. He also appeared in Fast Food Nation, playing a fast food executive who discovers secrets about his company. In 2008, he starred in Flash of Genius, a docudrama about Robert Kearns who invented the intermittent windshield wiper. His portrayal of then-Major Bruce P. Crandall in 2002's We Were Soldiers brought public attention to Crandall's heroism during the 1965 Battle of Ia Drang. (On February 26, 2007, Crandall was awarded the Medal of Honor by President Bush.) In Baby Mama, Kinnear played Rob, a local smoothie shop owner and the romantic interest of Kate (Tina Fey).

In 2010, he starred as the estranged father of Miley Cyrus' character in The Last Song. In 2011, Kinnear starred in the miniseries The Kennedys playing the lead role as John F. Kennedy. It was originally planned to air on the History Channel; however, it was announced in January 2011, that the miniseries had been pulled from that network. It was subsequently picked up by ReelzChannel and first aired on April 3, 2011. Kinnear played a famous novelist in Josh Boone's directorial debut film Stuck in Love, which followed his relationships with his former wife (Jennifer Connelly) and teenage children.

In 2023, Kinnear guest starred in Part 2 of Season 4 of You as Tom Lockwood, the father of Joe Goldberg's (Penn Badgley) latest love interest, Kate Galvin (Charlotte Ritchie).

== Personal life ==
On May 1, 1999, Kinnear married Helen Labdon, a retired British glamour model. They have three daughters.

== Acting credits ==
=== Film ===
Year	Title	Role	Notes
1994	Blankman	Talk Show Host	Film role debut
1995	Sabrina	David Larrabee	
1996	Dear God	Tom Turner	
1996	Beavis and Butt-Head Do America	ATF Agent Bork	Voice; uncredited
1997	A Smile Like Yours	Danny Robertson	
1997	As Good as It Gets	Simon Bishop	
1998	You've Got Mail	Frank Navasky	
1999	Mystery Men	Captain Amazing / Lance Hunt	
2000	What Planet Are You From?	Perry Gordon	
2000	Nurse Betty	Dr. David Ravell / George McCord	
2000	Loser	Professor Edward Alcott	
2000	The Gift	Wayne Collins	
2001	Someone like You	Ray Brown	
2002	We Were Soldiers	Maj. Bruce "Snake" Crandall	
2002	Auto Focus	Bob Crane	
2003	Stuck on You	Walter Tenor	
2004	Godsend	Paul Duncan	
2005	The Matador	Danny Wright	
2005	Robots	Phineas T. Ratchet	Voice
2005	Bad News Bears	Ray Bullock	
2006	Fast Food Nation	Robert Anderson	
2006	Little Miss Sunshine	Richard Hoover	
2006	Invincible	Dick Vermeil	
2006	Unknown	Broken Nose	
2007	Feast of Love	Bradley Miller	
2008	Baby Mama	Rob Ackerman	
2008	Ghost Town	Frank Herlihy	
2008	Flash of Genius	Bob Kearns	
2010	Green Zone	Clark Poundstone	
2010	The Last Song	Steve Miller	
2011	Thin Ice	Mickey Prohaska	
2011	That's What I Am	Narrator	Uncredited
2011	Salvation Boulevard	Carl Vanderveer	
2011	I Don't Know How She Does It	Richard Reddy	
2012	Stuck in Love	Bill Borgens	
2013	Movie 43	Griffin Schraeder	Segment: "The Pitch"
2013	The English Teacher	Dr. Richard Riker	
2013	Anchorman 2: The Legend Continues	Gary Bragger	
2014	Heaven Is for Real	Todd Burpo	
2014	Murder of a Cat	Al Ford	
2016	Little Men	Brian Jardine	
2017	Brigsby Bear	Detective Vogel	
2017	Same Kind of Different as Me	Ron Hall	
2018	Brian Banks	Justin Brooks	
2019	Frankie	Gary	
2019	Strange but True	Richard Chase	
2019	Phil	Phil	Also director and executive producer
2019	The Red Sea Diving Resort	Walton Bowen	
2020	Misbehaviour	Bob Hope	
2021	Crisis	Dean Geoff Talbot	
2023	Sight	Misha Bartnovsky	
2024	The Present	Eric Diehl	
2024	You Gotta Believe	Coach Jon Kelly	
2025	Off the Grid	Ranish	
2026	Seekers of Infinite Love	TBA	
2026	The Saviors	Jim Clemente	
TBA	Shiver †	TBA	Post-production
TBA	Monsanto †	TBA	Filming
TBA	America's Favorite †	TBA	Post-production

=== Television ===
Year	Title	Role	Notes
1988	What Price Victory	Teacher's Assistant	Television film
1989	Life Goes On	Corey	Episode: "Break a Leg, Mom"
1990	Murder in Mississippi	News Reporter	Television film
1990	Mancuso, F.B.I.	Photographer	Episode: "Adamant Eve"
1991	L.A. Law	Reporter	Episode: "Spleen It to Me, Lucy"
1991	Best of the Worst	Himself (host)	
1991	Dillinger	Arizona Legislator	Television film
1991–1995	Talk Soup	Himself (host)	Also executive producer
1993	Based on an Untrue Story	Orlando Chang Stein	Television film
1994–1996	Later with Greg Kinnear	Himself (host)	Also executive producer
1998	The Larry Sanders Show	Greg Kinnear	Episode: "Flip"
2000	Happily Ever After: Fairy Tales for Every Child	Prince Gavin	Voice role; episode: "The Frog Princess"
2001	Dinner with Friends	Tom	Television film
2003	Friends	Benjamin Hobart	Episode: "The One with Ross's Grant"
2011	The Kennedys	John F. Kennedy	Main role
2012	Modern Family	Tad	Episode: "Me? Jealous?"
2014	Rake	Keegan Deane	Main role; also executive producer
2015	Drunk History	Thaddeus Lowe	Episode: "New Jersey"
2016	Confirmation	Joe Biden	Television film
2016	BoJack Horseman	Greg Kinglear	Voice role; episode: "Start Spreading the News"
2018	Electric Dreams	Father	Episode: "Father Thing"
2018	House of Cards	Bill Shepherd	7 episodes
2018, 2019	Unbreakable Kimmy Schmidt	Himself	2 episodes
2019	The Twilight Zone	Captain Lane Pendleton	Episode: "A Traveler"
2020–2021	The Stand	Glen Bateman	5 episodes
2022	Black Bird	Brian Miller	Miniseries
2022–2023	Shining Vale	Terry Phelps	16 episodes
2023	You	Tom Lockwood	3 episodes
2024	Curb Your Enthusiasm	Earl Mack	Episode: "No Lessons Learned"
2025	Smoke	Harvey Englehart	Miniseries
2026	Margo's Got Money Troubles	Kenny	Miniseries
2026	Life, Larry and the Pursuit of Unhappiness	Rescuer	Episode: "Lawrence"

=== Theater ===
Year	Title	Role	Theatre	Refs.
2012	The Power of Duff	Charles Duff	Powerhouse Theater	
2022	To Kill a Mockingbird	Atticus Finch	Shubert Theatre, Broadway	
