= Historical Dictionary Project of the Hebrew Language =

The Historical Dictionary Project of the Hebrew Language (HDP; Hebrew: מִפְעַל הַמִּלּוֹן הַהִיסְטוֹרִי) is a long-term research undertaking of the Academy of the Hebrew Language. According to the Academy's website, "The overarching goal of the HDP is to present the history and development of the Hebrew lexicon, from the earliest occurrences of words down through their most recent documentation." It aims to encompass the entire Hebrew lexicon throughout its history; that is, to present every Hebrew word in its morphological, semantical, and contextual development from its first appearance in written texts to the present.

The editorial board consists of Prof. Chaim E. Cohen, editor-in-chief; Prof. Steven (Shmuel) Fassberg, associate editor; and Dr. Gabriel Birnbaum, writer of the entries.

== Origins ==
As early as 1937, the president of Va'ad HaLashon ("The Language Committee", which later became the Academy of the Hebrew Language), Prof. Naftali Herz Tur-Sinai, proposed the establishment of "a large endeavor which prepares an academic dictionary of our language, in all of the periods and evolutions that it has endured from the moment it is documented, until today." A formal decision to undertake the HDP was taken in 1955.

== Preparation ==
The HDP is based on Hebrew texts up until 1100 CE, and large selections of Hebrew literature from the period thereafter until the founding of the State of Israel. As much scholarly attention had already been given to the Hebrew Bible and the Pseudepigrapha, it was decided to begin with texts from the post-biblical period. The database thus reflects more than 2000 years of Hebrew writing. Such a project requires a large textual database, and the HDP was one of the first in the world to develop and use a computerized concordance. In 2005, some fifty years after commencement, it was decided there was enough material to begin the writing of entries.

== Sources ==
The Academy initially debated as to whether it should create a series of dictionaries according to periods or literary genres, or whether it should work towards a single integrated work. In 1959 it was decided that there would be one central dictionary containing all periods, i.e., ancient, medieval and modern Hebrew literature. Material was first gathered from ancient literature written between 200 BCE and 1100 CE, and later, modern literature from 1750 onwards. Sources include material discovered at the Cairo Genizah. Material from Karaite sources is also included, and material from Samaritan sources may be added in the future. Compilation of the list of documentary sources for the dictionary was completed in 1963 with the publication of Sefer ha-Meqorot [Source Book] for sources "from the canonization of the Bible until the conclusion of the Geonic period." The Source Book serves as the foundation for all work on the dictionary.

== Database ==
Work on the HDP is based on the best available manuscripts of the texts, which are entered into the database and then analyzed. In those cases where there are several extant manuscripts, the clearest and most complete manuscript is selected for incorporation into the dictionary.

In 1982 the Academy published a sample entry for the dictionary based on the triliteral root ערב. The 88-page entry was published in the Academy’s journal "Leshonenu" ("Our Language").

In 2010, the database of Hebrew texts from the post-biblical period down through the 11th century, and the database of modern texts from 1750 onwards, were united into a single database. This database serves as an archive of not only individual words, but also complete texts that have been carefully copied from their source. In addition to enabling grammatical analyses and concordance searches, the archives also contain unique corpora, such as Hebrew poetry from the 11th century. The database is accessible to the public.

The database draws upon some 4,300 Hebrew sources, from the classic Rabbinic literature period (2nd century BCE) through the Geonic period (11th century CE) to 1947. Literary strata and genres represented include the Dead Sea Scrolls, inscriptions, Talmud and Midrash, Geonic literature, prayer and piyyut, Karaite literature, science, deeds, colophons, amulets, and the like. Essentially a concordance, the online resource accesses all the words in the database and enables retrieval of citations according to roots, lemmata, and declined forms or combinations, as well as of specific texts by title, author, date, or literary genre. It is updated as new research becomes available and as more old texts are discovered.

As of 7 June 2010, the twenty-million word database contained 4,056 Hebrew roots. Of its 54,807 entries, 14,592 are nouns, adjectives and adverbs, and 13,979 are verbs. The balance consists of personal names, numbers, prepositions and similar lexical items. The size of the database on that date was about 40 gigabytes. The complete lexical archive will contain at least 25 million quotations.
