= Flash of Genius (film) =

2008 American film by Marc Abraham

- Theatrical release poster
- Directed by: Marc Abraham
- Written by: Philip Railsback
- Based on: "The Flash of Genius" by John Seabrook
- Produced by: Gary Barber; Roger Birnbaum; Michael Lieber
- Starring: Greg Kinnear; Lauren Graham; Dermot Mulroney
- Cinematography: Dante Spinotti
- Edited by: Jill Savitt
- Music by: Aaron Zigman
- Production companies: Spyglass Entertainment; Strike Entertainment
- Distributed by: Universal Pictures
- Release date: October 3, 2008
- Running time: 119 minutes
- Country: United States
- Language: English
- Budget: $20 million
- Box office: $4.8 million

Flash of Genius is a 2008 American biographical drama film directed by Marc Abraham. Philip Railsback wrote the screenplay based on a 1993 New Yorker article by John Seabrook. The story focuses on Robert Kearns (played by Greg Kinnear) and his legal battle against the Ford Motor Company after they developed an intermittent windshield wiper based on ideas the inventor had patented. The film's title comes from the phrase "flash of genius" (like "stroke of genius"), which is patent law terminology that was in effect from 1941 to 1952, although Kearns's patent was filed in 1964; it held that the inventive act must come into the mind of an inventor as a kind of epiphany, and not as the result of tinkering.

The film opened on 1,098 screens in the United States on October 3, 2008, and earned $2.2 million on its opening weekend. It remained in theaters for only three weeks, and eventually grossed only $4.6 million worldwide, coming up short against its $20 million budget.

== Plot ==
On his wedding night in 1953, an errant champagne cork renders Detroit college engineering professor Robert Kearns almost completely blind in his left eye. Ten years later, he is happily married to Phyllis and the father of six children. As he drives his Ford Galaxie through a light rain, the constant movement of the windshield wipers irritates his troubled vision. The incident inspires him to create a wiper blade mechanism modeled on the human eye, which blinks every few seconds rather than continuously.

With financial support from Gil Previck, Kearns converts his basement into a laboratory and develops a prototype he tests in a fish tank before installing it in his car. He patents his invention and demonstrates it for Ford researchers, who had been working on a similar project without success. Kearns refuses to explain how his mechanism works until he hammers out a favorable deal with the corporation. Impressed with Kearns' results, executive Macklin Tyler asks him to prepare a business plan detailing the cost of the individual units, which Kearns intends to manufacture himself. Considering this to be sufficient commitment from the company, Kearns rents a warehouse he plans to use as a factory and forges ahead. He presents Ford with the pricing information it requested along with a sample unit, and then waits for their response. Time passes, and when nobody contacts Kearns, he begins placing phone calls that are never returned.

Frustrated, Kearns attends a Ford dealers' convention at which the latest model of the Mustang is unveiled, promoting the intermittent wiper as a selling point. Realizing the company has used his idea without giving him credit or payment for it, Kearns begins his descent into a despair so deep he boards a Greyhound bus and heads for Washington, D.C., where he apparently hopes to find legal recourse. Instead, Maryland state troopers remove him from the bus and escort him to a psychiatric hospital, where he is treated for a nervous breakdown. Finally released when doctors decide his obsession has subsided, he returns home a broken man, determined to receive public acknowledgement for his accomplishment. Thus begins years of legal battles, during which time his wife leaves him, and he becomes estranged from his children.

At trial, Kearns represents himself after attorney Gregory Lawson withdraws from the case, because Kearns refuses to settle. Eventually Kearns' ex-wife and children support him in his endeavor. Toward the end of the trial, Ford offers Kearns a $30 million settlement, but without admitting wrongdoing. Kearns decides to leave his fate in the hands of the jury, who determine that Ford infringed his patents, but that the infringement was not deliberate. The jury awards him $10.1 million. The closing credits indicate that Kearns later wins an $18.7 million judgement from Chrysler Corporation as well.

== Cast ==
- Greg Kinnear as Robert Kearns, inventor
- Lauren Graham as Phyllis Kearns, wife
- Dermot Mulroney as Gil Previck, financial support
- Alan Alda as Gregory Lawson, attorney
- Mitch Pileggi as Macklin Tyler, Ford executive
- Daniel Roebuck as Frank Sertin
- Bill Smitrovich as Judge Michael Franks
- Tim Kelleher as Charles Defao
- Jake Abel as Dennis (21 Years)
- Tatiana Maslany as older Kathy Kearns
- Ben & Gavin Kuiack as baby Bob Jr Kearns
- Chuck Shamata as Professor Irwin

== Production ==
Marc Abraham, who previously had produced The Road to Wellville (1994), Air Force One (1997), and Children of Men (2006), among many films, had long been drawn to the Robert Kearns saga for his directorial debut because the inventor believed more in fairness and honesty than the money offered to make him drop his lawsuit. "That's the reason I was passionate about it. It was about principle", the director said. "And principle is a very gray idea. And that's what I thought was exciting." He submitted numerous revisions of the screenplay to Universal Studios chief Stacey Snider, who repeatedly told him, "This is not an easy script, and he's not a likable guy". Abraham believed what many might find unlikable in Kearns, with whom he consulted while developing the film, is what made him a distinctive character. When Universal underwent a change of management, the project finally was greenlit.

The film was shot on location in Hamilton and Toronto, Ontario.

The scene when Ford's new line of cars with the intermittent wiper is shown for the first time was shot in the Queen Elizabeth Theatre in Vancouver, British Columbia.

The soundtrack includes "Too Many Fish In The Sea" by Liam Titcomb, "Green Onions" by Booker T. & the M.G.'s, and "Tennessee Waltz" by Aaron Zigman.

The film premiered at the Telluride Film Festival and was shown at the Toronto International Film Festival before going into theatrical release in the United States.

== Critical reception ==
Flash of Genius received mixed to positive reviews. As of January 2016, Rotten Tomatoes reports that Flash of Genius has a 62% approval rating with an average rating of 5.97/10, based on 106 reviews. The website's consensus reads, "The touching underdog story of a single guy against a massive corporation, Flash of Genius is a well-paced and well-written tale with a standout performance by star Greg Kinnear." On Metacritic, the film has a score of 57 out of 100, indicating "mixed or average" reviews.

Stephen Holden of The New York Times called the film "a meticulously constructed mechanism, one that wants to convey the same mixture of idealism, obsession and paranoia found in whistle-blower movies like Silkwood and The Insider", but thought it "has the tone and texture of a well-made but forgettable television movie". He added, "Flash of Genius would have been more gripping had it pinpointed events and conveyed the harrowing physical, emotional and financial cost of Kearns’s quest".

Roger Ebert of the Chicago Sun-Times said the film tells its story in "faithful and often moving detail". He added, "If it has a handicap, it's that Kearns was not a colorful character, more of a very stubborn man with tunnel vision.... Kinnear, often a player of light comedy, does a convincing job of making this quiet, resolute man into a giant slayer."

Mark Olsen of the Los Angeles Times said the film's problem "is that it wants so desperately to be a Hollywood-style story of the little guy triumphing over the big guy that it races past much of the subtlety of Kearns' story, smoothing things out so that it wouldn't be a spoiler to reveal the ending (though I won't) because it's blatantly marching in from a mile away. Flash of Genius wants so much to be liked, even with its prickly, difficult hero, that it misses the mark of nonobviousness necessary not only for a patent, but also for a thrilling, original work".

Todd McCarthy of Variety agreed with Olsen and Holden, describing the film as "very small potatoes in the cinematic annals of inspiring little-guy-fights-the-system melodramas, to the point that it's a wonder it was thought to be strong bigscreen material; an old-style TV movie would have been more like it". He added, "Beyond the narrative shortcomings, the film is indifferently filmed, with uncustomarily flat visuals by cinematographer Dante Spinotti and listless pacing."

Peter Hartlaub of the San Francisco Chronicle said the biopic "is like watching Charlie Brown keep trying, even after the 30th time Lucy has pulled the football away. It's hard to tell whether Kearns is being noble or stupid, and halfway through the movie, most sane people in the audience will be rooting for him to give up his fight". He continued, "Marc Abraham has made a movie much like the Will Smith-as-plucky-homeless-guy drama The Pursuit of Happyness, where two hours of suffering may or may not lead to a single triumphant moment. It's a similar experience to watching a 1-0 soccer game that is decided in overtime. Sure, absolutely nothing resembling feel-good entertainment happens in the first 90 minutes. But oh, that overtime goal ..."

Peter Travers of Rolling Stone rated the film three out of four stars and commented, "Kinnear takes the star spot in Flash of Genius and rides it to glory...Kearns wasn't a movie hero. His halting courtroom delivery lacked Hollywood histrionics. Kinnear plays him with blunt honesty, sagging under the weight of stress but maintaining a bulldog tenacity that would win the day. Was the battle worth it? Kearns' conflict is readable in Kinnear's every word and gesture. His performance is worth cheering".

Kinnear won the Best Actor Award at the 2008 Boston Film Festival.
