= Harness IP =

American law firm

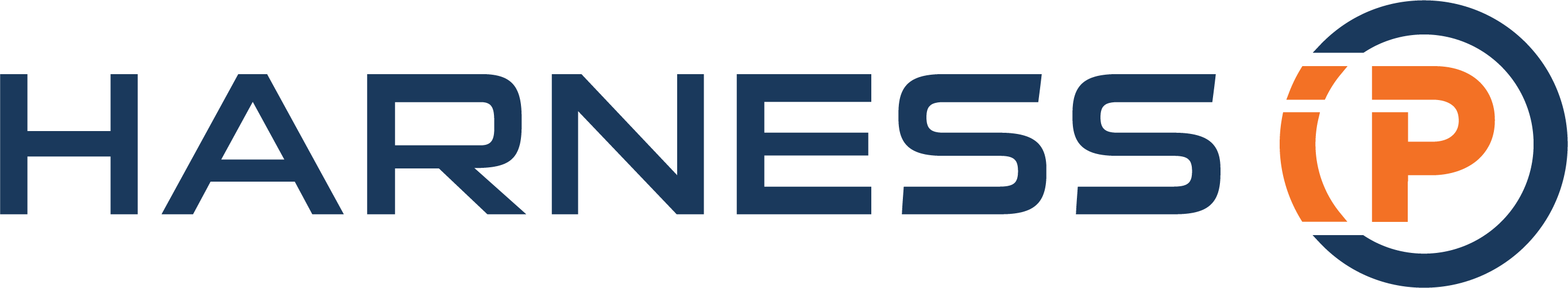
- Headquarters: Troy, Michigan
- No. of offices: 4
- No. of attorneys: 90+
- No. of employees: 280
- Major practice areas: Intellectual property
- Date founded: 1921
- Founder: Jake Harness, Art Dickey, Hodgson Pierce
- Company type: Partnership
- Website: www.harnessip.com

Harness IP is a law firm headquartered in Troy, Michigan. In October 2021, the firm announced it adopted Harness IP as its new name. The firm previously went by Harness Dickey.

Harness IP focuses exclusively on intellectual property. The firm provides legal services in all areas of patents, trademarks, and copyrights — including preparation and prosecution, licensing, litigation, and portfolio management services — as well as handling anti-counterfeiting, international rights, due diligence, and trade secret matters.

== History ==
Harness IP was established in 1921 by J. King Harness. In 1925, Art Dickey and Hodgson Pierce joined the firm as partners.

Harness IP's first office was located within the General Motors Building. In the mid-1960s, the firm moved to the Fisher Building, followed by a move to Birmingham in 1973. The firm moved to its current office in Troy, Michigan, in the early 1990s.

Since then, the firm has opened three offices outside of Michigan: the firm's Clayton, Missouri office opened in 2000; the Reston, Virginia office opened in 2001; and the firm's Frisco, Texas office opened in 2015.

In early 2020, Harness IP created its first-ever CEO position and named former firm Principal Bill Coughlin to the new role.

Today, the firm serves clients operating in a range of industries, including: agrifood tech; automotive and autonomous vehicles; biologics and biosimilars; chemistry and materials science; clean and green technology; consumer electronics; consumer products; electrical, computer, and internet; energy production and delivery; image processing; manufacturing; mechanical and electromechanical; medical devices; pharmaceutical and biotechnology; semiconductors; software and information technology; and telecommunications and wireless technology.

== Rankings ==
In 2025, Harness IP was ranked as a top firm in Technology Center 3700 by Juristat. In 2021, Harness IP obtained 2,963 U.S. utility patents for its clients and was ranked tenth among the nation's top law firms by Harrity Analytics. Harness IP attorneys also obtained 343 U.S. trademark registrations in 2021 and were ranked tenth in the U.S. according to a poll published by the Oppedahl Toteboard. In 2020 the firm obtained the most utility patents.

Harness IP is included in the Chambers USA guide for its Michigan and Missouri offices. Chambers describes the firm as “well versed in patent prosecution and enforcement” and “provides wide-ranging assistance with portfolio management, and in regard to IP licensing issues.” The description further commends the firm's “expertise in litigious mandates including inter partes reviews and domain name disputes as well as IP transactional matters such as due diligence.” Individual attorneys Beth Coakley, Matt Cutler, and Greg Meyer were also named as notable practitioners.

== Office locations ==
While Harness IP conducts most of its business at a global level, its four physical offices are located in the United States.

- Troy, Michigan
- Clayton, Missouri
- Reston, Virginia
- Frisco, Texas

== Firm areas of practice ==
The following is a list of Harness IP areas of practice, as listed on its website.

- Patents
- Trademarks and service marks
- Intellectual property litigation
- PTAB proceedings
- Copyrights
- Intellectual property transactions and due diligence.

== See also ==
- Michigan Auto Law Firm
- Foster Swift Collins & Smith
