= Lemelson Foundation =

American nonprofit organization

The Lemelson Foundation is an American 501(c)(3) private foundation based in Portland, Oregon. It was founded in 1992 by Jerome H. Lemelson and his wife Dorothy Lemelson. The foundation held total net assets of $444 million at the end of 2020 and $414 million in 2024. It invests around $16 million a year, focusing on education and invention in the US, Kenya, and India, and on climate and ecosystems globally. The foundation has committed more than $290 million in grants and programme-related investments (PRIs) since its inception. The foundation seeks to harness the power of invention and innovation to accelerate climate action, support innovations in agriculture, water, sanitations, biodiversity, energy, education, and improve lives around the world.

== Origins ==
Jerome H. Lemelson based the foundation on his personal beliefs about the role of invention and inventors in the US economy. He believed that invention and innovation were keys to American economic success and dynamism. As a young inventor, Lemelson conceived of the idea of a foundation that would support and celebrate independent inventors. He organized the foundation as a resource for young inventors to support them with funding, connections to role models, and training that would give emerging inventors the ability to develop, refine, and take their inventions to market.

In 1992, Jerome Lemelson and his wife established the Lemelson Foundation. A memorial video produced after Lemelson's death includes this statement he made in 1996: "I have had a substantial amount of success in the last five years licensing my patents, and I feel I have an obligation to plow back a portion of the income I made to improve the lot of the inventor in America, and to improve the future economy of this country." During the 1990s, the foundation granted to a small group of grantees, including the Smithsonian National Museum of American History, and the Massachusetts Institute of Technology. More recently the foundation has granted to a wider variety of organizations in the United States and the developing world.

After Lemelson died in 1997, the foundation expanded its funding from programs in the US to include developing countries. In 2003, the foundation hired its first executive director and expanded its programs to support young inventors around the world and focus on economic development in poor countries. Dorothy Lemelson, Lemelson's widow and president of the foundation, stated that "this new direction as an expansion of her husband's original vision." She explained, "All his life, Jerry wanted to celebrate American invention. He felt it was what made this country strong. Now it's time to turn to the rest of the world and see what we can do for them."

== Programs ==
Based in Portland, Oregon, the foundation has donated or committed over $400 million to support education, invention, innovation, and climate action. In addition to supporting programs that assist inventors and supporting science and technology education in the U.S., the foundation broadened its mission to include fostering technological innovation that drives economic and social improvements in developing countries.

The foundation developed a framework called "Impact Inventing" to define its funding strategy. Impact inventing is based on three key concepts:

1. An invention should have positive social impact. The foundation supports inventions that address societal problems and community needs.
2. The invention needs to be environmentally responsible. The foundation encourages inventors to make carefully considered decisions that minimize the environmental footprint of both invention processes and final products.
3. The business model around the invention needs to be financially self-sustaining. The foundation supports programs that develop businesses that are scalable, market-tested, and economically viable.

== Initiatives ==
The Lemelson Foundation works in both the U.S. and in developing countries. Stated programmatic strategies involve creating an ecosystem where inventors and their innovations are supported from start to finish: from conception to full, self-sustaining enterprise. The foundation is focused on the development of inventions that rethink impact – projects. Examples include sanitation systems for the developing world, locally adapted medical devices, and efficient, affordable sources of renewable energy. The foundation has a special focus on its home state of Oregon through the Oregon MESA program and other investments.

Here are some of their active grantees:

Jerome and Dorothy Lemelson Center for the Study of Invention and Innovation. Housed within the Smithsonian's National Museum of American History, the Lemelson Center aims to document, interpret, and disseminate information about invention and innovation. The Center encourages inventive creativity in young people, and fosters an appreciation for the central role of invention and innovation in the history of the United States. It features invention-oriented exhibitions (currently Change Your Game); Spark!Lab, a hands-on invention workshop for children and families; and Inventive Minds, a gallery highlighting the invention documentation work done by the Lemelson Center.

The Lemelson Center also hosts Innovative Lives, an in-person and virtual event series where inventors are invited to share their stories and offer insights into the invention ideation, development, and distribution process. The center provides free curricular material to classrooms throughout the United States; organizes traveling museum exhibitions (such as "Invention at Play"); provides research opportunities and fellowships for scholars; and finds, obtains, and processes archival collections related to invention on behalf of the museum's Archives Center. These collections consist of the papers and materials documenting the work of American inventors.

The Lemelson-MIT Program. The Lemelson-MIT Program promotes the work of individual inventors through annual awards and competitions. It sponsors Lemelson-MIT InvenTeams, which provide direct support to high school teams of young inventors. The program provides funding for MIT faculty and students to work on inventions for the developing world. The program also offers resources to guide inventors in the development and marketing of their work, such as the Inventor Handbook.

Oregon MESA. The MESA Schools Program in Oregon is based at Portland State University. MESA teaches STEM, invention, and contemporary skills to historically underrepresented students. The program works within schools in grades 6–12, engaging students in math, engineering, science and technology projects. The program is free, offered to students in their schools, and has a family involvement component. MESA students work in teams throughout the school year to identify, design, and build prototypes that attempt to solve an issue for a designated client or population. Each year, the program culminates in MESA Day — the state competition for the MESA Schools Program — where students compete by testing and demonstrating their engineering projects. The winning team goes on to MESA USA's national competition for students participating in MESA across the country.

VentureWell. Formerly known as The National Collegiate Inventors and Innovators Alliance (NCIIA), VentureWell is a higher education network that focuses on invention and entrepreneurship and their relation to commercially viable businesses. For over 25 years, VentureWell has worked to support, train, and foster networks to ensure the next generation of science and technology innovators realize – and maximize – their potential in bringing their ideas to impact. VentureWell has supported over 6,000 early-stage innovators and helped launch 4,200+ ventures that have raised more than $6 billion in public and private investments. These ventures have reached millions of people in 51 countries with technological advancements in fields such as biotechnology, healthcare, sustainable energy and materials, and solutions for low-resource settings. Ventures launched through the program include Sanergy (hygienic sanitation systems in Africa) and Ecovative Design (environmentally friendly packaging).

Villgro. Villgro, an India-based organization, supports social entrepreneurship and incubation in rural India. The organization provides seed funding, mentoring, and coaching. As of 2024, Villgro has funded over 387 enterprises — 82 of which are women-led — created over 8,000 jobs, and estimated its impact, in terms of providing local adapted technologies in rural India, to over 20.8 million people. The program supported Biosense, a medical engineering and design form working to change diagnostics; Promethean Power Systems, which redesigns refrigeration systems for off-grid areas and other regions with electrical challenges; and OneBreath, affordable ventilators for impoverished areas to address the high rate of respiratory illness in India.

SELCO Incubation Lab. SELCO is a social enterprise that provides sustainable energy solutions and services to low income populations. SELCO Incubation Lab was established in 2009 to provide "new clean and sustainable technologies for the rural poor other than lighting." The lab is located at the SDM Institute of Technology, Ujire, Karnataka, India. In addition to developing new technology, the lab also serves as an incubation space for entrepreneurs—helping inventors with their independently owned enterprises. Part of SELCO's work involves building up a supply and demand chain for renewable energy—from manufacturing to design to fulfillment and sales.

Lemelson Early Inventor Prize. In 2019, the Lemelson Foundation also launched three-year $440,000 grants for middle school inventors across America.

== Past projects ==
Design for the Other 90%. This 2007 exhibition, produced by the Cooper-Hewitt National Design Museum in New York, focused on the design movement to develop cost-effective ways to increase access to food and water, energy, education, healthcare, transportation and revenue-generating activities low income areas in the developing world. The "90%" in the name refers to the percentage of the world population they consider to be under-resourced.

Gearbox. Gearbox is the first open makerspace for design and prototyping in Kenya. Members have access to the space to work together on projects that combine hardware and software, share ideas and skills, and develop a community of inventors working on computer technology, industrial art, robotics, and electronics. Gearbox provides design tools and rapid prototyping equipment (3D printers, 3D scanners, laser cutters, industrial sewing machines, vinyl cutters, engineering tools, and equipment for electronics creation and testing). An in-house store and in-house product designers provide additional resources to the public. The Lemelson Foundation was one of Gearbox's first funders. According to Lemelson Foundation Executive Director Carol Dahl, Gearbox "will provide a much-needed space for inventors to talk, build, test, and ultimately take their ideas to market."

The Lemelson-MIT Program Prizes As part of the Lemelson-MIT Program, The Lemelson Foundation previously supported an annual $500,000 Lemelson-MIT Prize and a series of graduate and undergraduate Lemelson-MIT National Collegiate Student Prizes in the amounts of $10,000 and $15,000.

The Lemelson RAMPs (Recognition and Mentoring Programs). RAMPs identified inventors at the economic "base of the pyramid" and provided mentoring and funding as they formulated enterprises and products. The RAMPs program began as a partnership with the Indian Institute of Technology Madras and the Rural Innovation Network in India, and then expanded to sites in Indonesia and Peru. RAMPs provided funding to inventors to develop and bring to market inventions that address basic human needs, improved the quality of life among the world's poor, and support innovations in sustainable development. While the foundation no longer uses the term RAMPS, in some cases it continues to support the work that came out of these enterprises through partner organizations in India, Indonesia, and Peru (including Villgro).

Innovators supported through RAMPs include:

- Dr. Sathya Jaganathan (India): Created a —a low-cost baby warmer— that reduced the rates of newborn and pre-term mortality at the rural hospital.
- Ari Purbayanto (Indonesia): Purbayanto has developed Suritech, a machine that separates the bones and meat of small by-catch fish, making it profitable for fishermen to sell the by-catch, rather than throw dead or dying fish back into the sea.

Technology Dissemination projects in Africa, Asia and Latin America. The foundation made exploratory grants in developing countries "to support invention education, develop specific technologies, and to disseminate new technology products in communities. Such projects included support for solar lighting, irrigation technologies, and neonatal devices." Funded organizations included:

- Kickstart. Based in Kenya, Kickstart develops agricultural production products for low SES farmers. As of 2015, Kickstart has sold over 350,000 treadle pumps, aiding in the creation of over 200,000+ small scale enterprises.
- SEWA (Self-Employed Women's Association) and SELCO (Solar Electric Light Company). SELCO adapts energy technologies for low SES populations, while SEWA helps women entrepreneurs launch businesses to sell the products.
- IDEAAS (Instituto para o Desenvolvimento de Energias Alternativas e da Auto Sustentabilidade). IDEAAS is a Brazilian organization that provides energy access in rural Brazil, promotes the efficient use of energy, and advances social entrepreneurship through renewable energy businesses.

NESsT Peru. NESsT works in Argentina, Brazil, Hungary, Peru, Poland, and Romania to support sustainable social enterprises that solve social problems. The organization supports social enterprises in scaling their businesses, and works on a portfolio-based model. The program, launched in 2007, provides financing and technical assistance to low-income individuals. Enterprises include agricultural businesses designed to help small farmers, a coding and personal development program for young women to bring them into the tech sector, and a solar power company that offers portable solar lamps and kitss, among others. As a long-term incubator which support business for 5 to 7 years, the program emphases evaluation, reporting, business planning and strategy.
