= Black Reel Award for Outstanding Actress, Drama Series =

Annual US television award

- Awarded for: Outstanding Actress, Drama Series
- Country: United States
- Presented by: Black Reel Awards for Television
- First award: 2017
- Currently held by: Zendaya, Euphoria (2022)
- Website: blackreelawards.com

This article lists the winners and nominees for the Black Reel Award for Television for Outstanding Actress, Drama Series. This category was first introduced in 2017 and won by Rutina Wesley for Queen Sugar. Wesley currently holds the record for most wins with 3 and is currently tied with Dawn-Lyen Gardner for nominations in this category with 4 nominations.

== Winners and nominees ==
Winners are listed first and highlighted in bold.

=== 2010s ===
Year	Actress	Series	Network	Ref
2017
2017	**Rutina Wesley**	**Queen Sugar**	**OWN**	
2017	Viola Davis	How to Get Away With Murder	ABC	
2017	Jurnee Smollett	Underground	WGN America	
2017	Taraji P. Henson	Empire	FOX	
2017	Dawn-Lyen Gardner	Queen Sugar	OWN	
2018
2018	**Rutina Wesley**	**Queen Sugar**	**OWN**	
2018	Taraji P. Henson	Empire	FOX	
2018	Dawn-Lyen Gardner	Queen Sugar	OWN	
2018	Niecy Nash	Claws	TNT	
2018	Kerry Washington	Scandal	ABC	
2019
2019	**Rutina Wesley**	**Queen Sugar**	**OWN**	
2019	Dawn-Lyen Gardner	Queen Sugar	OWN	
2019	Niecy Nash	Claws	TNT	
2019	Angela Bassett	9-1-1	FOX	
2019	Alfre Woodard	Luke Cage	Netflix	

=== 2020s ===
Year	Actress	Series	Network	Ref
2020
2020	**Zendaya**	**Euphoria**	**HBO**	
2020	Viola Davis	How to Get Away With Murder	ABC	
2020	Janelle Monae	Homecoming	Amazon Prime Video	
2020	Rutina Wesley	Queen Sugar	OWN	
2020	Simone Missick	All Rise	CBS	
2021
2021	**Jurnee Smollett**	**Lovecraft Country**	**HBO**	
2021	Dawn-Lyen Gardner	Queen Sugar	OWN	
2021	Simone Missick	All Rise	CBS	
2021	Queen Latifah	The Equalizer	CBS	
2021	Brandee Evans	P-Valley	Starz	
2022
2022	**Zendaya**	**Euphoria**	**HBO**	
2022	Tawny Cypress	Yellowjackets	Showtime	
2022	Naomie Harris	The Man Who Fell to Earth	Showtime	
2022	Queen Latifah	The Equalizer	CBS	
2022	Patina Miller	Power Book III: Raising Kanan	Starz	

== Superlatives ==
Superlative	Outstanding Actress, Drama Series
Actress with most awards	Rutina Wesley (3)
Actress with most nominations	Dawn-Lyen Gardner; Rutina Wesley (4)
Actress with most nominations without ever winning	Dawn-Lyen Gardner (4)

== Programs with multiple awards ==
3 awards

- Queen Sugar

2 awards

- Euphoria

== Performers with multiple awards ==
3 awards

- Rutina Wesley (3 consecutive)

2 awards

- Zendaya

== Programs with multiple nominations ==
8 nominations

- Queen Sugar

2 nominations

- All Rise
- Claws
- Empire
- Euphoria
- The Equalizer
- How to Get Away With Murder

== Performers with multiple nominations ==
4 nominations

- Dawn-Lyen Gardner
- Rutina Wesley

2 nominations

- Viola Davis
- Taraji P. Henson
- Queen Latifah
- Simone Missick
- Niecy Nash
- Jurnee Smollett
- Zendaya

== Total awards by network ==
- OWN - 3
- HBO - 3
