= Tina Lifford =

American actress

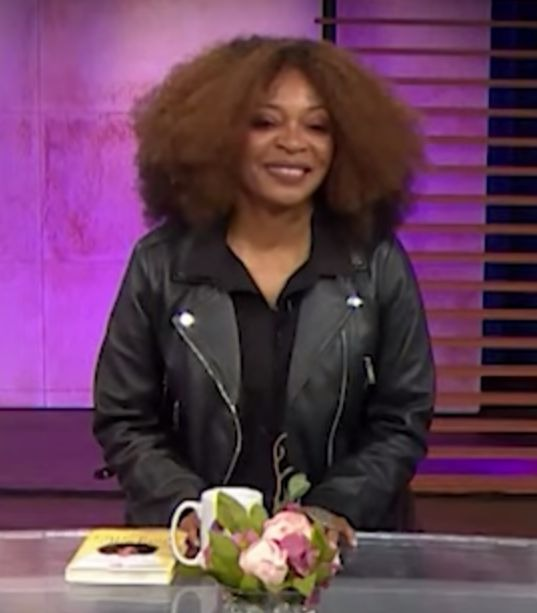
- Lifford in 2019
- Occupations: Actress, author, playwright
- Years active: 1983–present
- Website: www.tinalifford.com

Tina Lifford is an American actress and playwright. She is best known for her leading role as single mother Joan Mosley on the Fox sitcom South Central (1994), and her recurring role as Renee Trussell in the NBC drama series Parenthood (2010–2015). She has starring roles in the feature films Grand Canyon (1991), Blood Work (2002), and Hostage (2005). In 2016, Lifford began starring as Violet Bordelon (Aunt Vi) in the Oprah Winfrey Network drama series, Queen Sugar.

== Life and career ==
Tina Lifford began her career in the 1980s, appearing on television shows include Hill Street Blues, Cagney & Lacey, and Murder, She Wrote. From 1983 to 1988, she had the recurring role on Knots Landing. In film, she made her debut in The Ladies Club (1986). The following years, she had appeared in films include Nuts (1987), Colors (1988), Paris Trout (1991), Grand Canyon (1991), Letters from a Killer (1998), Panic (2000), Pay It Forward (2000), Joe Somebody (2001), Blood Work (2002), Hostage (2005), and Catch and Release (2006).

Lifford played the leading role as single mother Joan Mosley in the critically acclaimed but short-lived Fox comedy-drama series, South Central (1994). In addition to her leading role on South Central, Lifford was regular cast member on the short-lived NBC drama, Crisis Center (1997). She had number of starring roles on the made-for-television movies, include The Ernest Green Story (1993), Run for the Dream: The Gail Devers Story (1996) playing Jackie Joyner-Kersee, Mandela and de Klerk (1997) as Winnie Mandela, The Temptations (1998), and The Loretta Claiborne Story (2000) starring Kimberly Elise.

Over her career, Lifford has guest-starred in over 50 shows, include Touched by an Angel, Star Trek: Deep Space Nine, Any Day Now, NYPD Blue, NCIS, ER, and Nip/Tuck. She has also had recurring roles on Family Law (1999–2001), CSI: Crime Scene Investigation (2004–2005), Lincoln Heights (2007–2009), Parenthood (2010–2015) as Joy Bryant's mother and Scandal (2015).

In 2016, Lifford was cast in her first series regular role since the 1990s, in the Oprah Winfrey Network drama Queen Sugar, produced by Ava DuVernay and Oprah Winfrey. She played the role of Violet Bordelon, the aunt to the Bordelon siblings Nova (Rutina Wesley), Ralph Angel (Kofi Siriboe) and Charley (Dawn-Lyen Gardner). Violet was a spunky woman involved in a long-term relationship with a younger man (played by Omar Dorsey). For her performance, Lifford received two NAACP Image Awards nominations for Outstanding Supporting Actress in a Drama Series, as well as Black Reel Awards nomination.

== Filmography ==
=== Film ===
Year	Title	Role	Notes
1984	Why Me?	-	TV movie
1986	The Ladies Club	Patty	
1987	Jaws: The Revenge	Additional Voices	
1987	Nuts	Lawyer #2	
1988	Colors	Mrs. Craig	
1988	Casual Sex?	Additional Voices	
1989	The Fabulous Baker Boys	Background Voice	
1991	New Jack City	Recovering Addict	
1991	Paris Trout	Mary Sayers	
1991	Wedlock	Policewoman	
1991	The Rape of Doctor Willis	Officer Rollins	TV movie
1991	Grand Canyon	Deborah	
1992	Bebe's Kids	Additional Voices	
1993	The Ernest Green Story	Mrs. Green	TV movie
1993	Doppelganger	Additional Voices	
1993	Born Too Soon	Latanya	TV movie
1994	In the Line of Duty: The Price of Vengeance	Jean	TV movie
1995	Babe	Sheep (voice)	
1995	Divas	Geraldine	TV movie
1995	A Streetcar Named Desire	The Neighbor	TV movie
1996	America's Dream	Sarah	TV movie
1996	Run for the Dream: The Gail Devers Story	Jackie Joyner-Kersee	TV movie
1996	After Jimmy	Susan Johnson	TV movie
1996	The Longest Season	Employment Counselor	Short
1997	Mandela and de Klerk	Winnie Mandela	TV movie
1997	Cloned	Claire Barnes	TV movie
1998	Letters from a Killer	Elizabeth	
1998	Secrets	-	Short
1998	The Temptations	Haze	TV movie
2000	Panic	Dr. Leavitt	
2000	The '70s	Aunt Olavee	TV movie
2000	Pay It Forward	Principal	
2001	A Girl Thing	Sharon	TV movie
2001	Amy's Orgasm	Irene Barris	
2001	Joe Somebody	Cassandra Taylor	
2002	Blood Work	Detective Jaye Winston	
2005	Hostage	Laura Shoemaker	
2005	Urban Legends: Bloody Mary	Grace Taylor	Video
2006	Catch and Release	Eve	
2010	The Ties That Bind	Karen White	Short
2016	The Devil's Dolls	Della	
2017	A Gift to Remember	Mrs. Henley	TV movie
2019	Cherished Memories: A Gift to Remember 2	Mrs. Henley	TV movie
2021	A Holiday in Harlem	Mama Belle	TV movie
2024	We Strangers	Willie Martin	Completed

=== Television ===
Year	Title	Role	Notes
1983	Hill Street Blues	Stenographer	Episode: "Death by Kiki"
1983-88	Knots Landing	Tina	Guest: seasons 4 & 6 & 9, recurring cast: seasons 7-8
1984	Cagney & Lacey	Precinct Officer	Episode: "The Bounty Hunter"
1984-85	T.J. Hooker	Lorraine/Nurse	Episode: "Hooker's Run" & "The Assassin"
1985	Murder, She Wrote	Leora Cargill	Episode: "Tough Guys Don't Die"
1986	Amen	Ruth	Episode: "Maitre D'eacon"
1987	Perfect Strangers	Mrs. Cooper	Episode: "Dog Gone Blues"
1987	It's Garry Shandling's Show	Nurse Helen	Episode: "Pete Has an Affair"
1987	Jake and the Fatman	-	Episode: "Fatal Attraction"
1987	Days of Our Lives	Dora/Nurse Audrey	Episode: "Episode #1.5424" & "Episode #1.5601"
1987	Frank's Place	Ray's Wife	Episode: "Season's Greetings"
1988	Simon & Simon	Elissa Byers	Episodes: "Love Song of Abigail Marsh" & "Shadows"
1989	Tour of Duty	Nurse Pritchard	Episode: "Doc Hock"
1990	Hunter	Frankie Mason	Episode: "Unacceptable Loss"
1991	True Colors	Ruth	Episode: "A Moment of Ruth"
1991	The Fresh Prince of Bel-Air	Mrs. Hoover	Episode: "The Mother of All Battles"
1991	Beverly Hills, 90210	Felicity Ashe	Episode: "Ashes to Ashes"
1993	Love & War	Dee Dee Burnette	Episode: "Valentine's Day"
1993	Life Goes On	Admitting Nurse	Episode: "Five to Midnight
1993	L.A. Law	Faith Glassman	Episodes: "Pacific Rimshot" & "Safe Sex"
1994	South Central	Joan Mosely	Main cast
1995	Star Trek: Deep Space Nine	Lee	Episodes: "Past Tense: Part I & Part II"
1995	Courthouse	Holly Baker	Episode: "Conflict of Interest"
1995-96	American Gothic	Loris Holt	Recurring cast
1997	Crisis Center	Tess Robinson	Main cast
1997	Gun	Sally	Episode: "All the President's Women"
1998	Touched by an Angel	Sis	Episode: "Doodlebugs"
1998	The Practice	Mrs. Johnson	Episode: "Trees in the Forest"
1998	Martial Law	Halle Winship	Episode: "How Sammo Got His Groove Back"
1998	JAG	Juanita Ressler	Episode: "Act of Terror"
1999-2001	Family Law	Judge Alice Kingston	Recurring cast
2000	Any Day Now	Savannah Dakar	Episode: "Homegirl"
2000	The Wonderful World of Disney	Rita Claiborne	Episode: "The Loretta Claiborne Story"
2000	NYPD Blue	Lorraine Wiggins	Episode: "Brothers Under Arms"
2000	That's Life	-	Episode: "Pilot"
2000	JAG	Juanita Ressler	Episode: "JAG TV"
2001	Judging Amy	Ms. Arroyo	Episode: "Darkness for Light"
2001	Strong Medicine	Brenda Babson	Episode: "Bloodwork"
2003	For the People	-	Episode: "Power Play"
2003	Karen Sisco	Anya Devlin	Episode: "Blown Away"
2003	The Lyon's Den	Halle Berger	Episode: "Hubris"
2004	Threat Matrix	The Female Pathologist	Episode: "PPX"
2004-05	CSI: Crime Scene Investigation	Judge Witherspoon	Recurring cast: season 5, guest: season 6
2005	NCIS	Dr. Pamela Fox	Episode: "Witness"
2005	ER	Evelyn Pratt	Recurring cast: Season 12
2006	Mystery Woman	Bonnie	Episode: "Sing Me a Murder" & "Redemption"
2006	Heroes	Paulette Hawkins	Episode: "Chapter Three 'One Giant Leap'"
2007-09	Lincoln Heights	Dorothy Hammond	Recurring cast: seasons 2-4
2008	In Plain Sight	Denise McBride / Denise Morris	Episode: "Iris Doesn't Live Here Anymore"
2008	Cold Case	Phoebe Curtis '08	Episode: "Triple Threat"
2009	Nip/Tuck	Warden DeMarco	Recurring cast: Season 6
2010	Criminal Minds	Nora	Episode: "...A Thousand Words"
2010-15	Parenthood	Renee Trussell	Guest: seasons 1 & 3, 5-6, recurring cast: seasons 2 & 4
2011	The Protector	-	Episode: "Class"
2011	Friends with Benefits	Marsha	Episode: "The Benefit of Forgetting"
2012	Drop Dead Diva	Judge Nora Lafford	Episode: "Welcome Back"
2012	Single Ladies	Evelyn Lancaster	Recurring cast: season 2
2015	Minority Report	Lily Vega	Recurring cast
2015-17	Scandal	CIA Director Lowry	Recurring cast: seasons 4 & 6
2016	Criminal Minds: Beyond Borders	Brenda Willis	Episode: "Denial"
2016-22	Queen Sugar	Violet Bordelon	Main cast
2020	The Rookie	Warden Miller	Episode: "Under the Gun"
2020	Filthy Rich	Monique	Recurring cast

== Awards and nominations ==
Year	Awards	Category	Recipient	Outcome
1996	CableACE Awards	CableACE Award for Best Actress in a Dramatic Special or Series	"America's Dream"	Nominated
2018	NAACP Image Award	NAACP Image Award for Outstanding Supporting Actress in a Drama Series	"Queen Sugar"	Nominated
2019	Black Reel Awards	Black Reel Award for Outstanding Supporting Actress, Drama Series	"Queen Sugar"	Nominated
2020	NAACP Image Award	NAACP Image Award for Outstanding Supporting Actress in a Drama Series	"Queen Sugar"	Nominated
