= Brian Michael Smith =

American actor (born 1983)

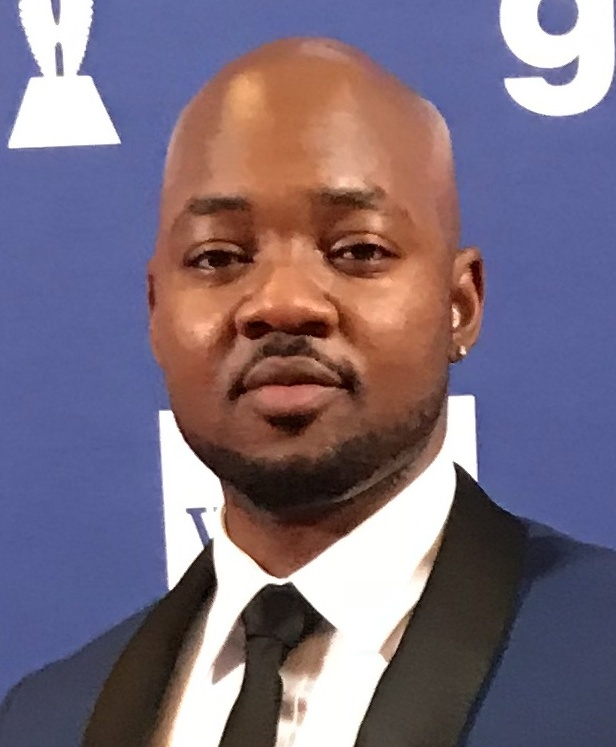
- Smith in 2018
- Born: January 29, 1983 (age 43); Ann Arbor, Michigan, US
- Education: Pioneer High School; Kent State University
- Occupation: Actor
- Years active: 2012–present

Brian Michael Smith (born January 29, 1983) is an American actor and LGBTQ advocate. He is known for playing Paul Strickland in the Fox procedural drama series 9-1-1: Lone Star (2020–2025).

== Early life ==
Smith was raised on the east side of Ann Arbor, Michigan by his mother, Ingrid Smith, an event planner and Ford Motor Company employee, with the support of a close-knit family. He and his mother spent his early years living with aunts, cousins, and a brother. Smith is a transgender man. Though assigned female at birth he identified and was perceived as male throughout his childhood. He challenged pressures to conform to his assigned gender role through performance and athletics.

While attending Ann Arbor Pioneer High School, he played defensive end and fullback on the boys' football team during the fall, and set records in shot put and pole vaulting on the girls track & field team in the spring. On September 17, 1999, during a game at Traverse City, Smith became the first person assigned female at birth to score a varsity touchdown in the state of Michigan.

Smith studied acting and video production at Kent State University. Upon graduation, he began teaching drama and media literacy to teens until he moved to New York City to pursue a career in acting.

He began training under Terry Knickerbocker at the William Esper Studio in 2011. While studying, he earned featured roles on a few TV shows and a Toyota commercial opposite Eli Manning.

== Career ==
He has also explored the stage, performing stand-up, sketch, and improv comedy as a member of numerous troupes including Gotham City Improv, as well as acting in off-Broadway and regional theater in a handful of plays, including Women Are Crazy Because Men Are A**Holes and Mitch Albom's Duck Hunter Shoots Angel.

In 2015, he earned his first speaking credit in Season 4 of HBO's Girls opposite Jemima Kirke and Adam Driver. This followed with similar roles on TV shows including Blue Bloods, Person of Interest, and Law & Order: Special Victims Unit.

His role as Toine Wilkins, a police officer, in Ava DuVernay's Queen Sugar, (OWN), launched him into a series of high-profile roles including political strategist Pierce Williams in Showtime's The L Word: Generation Q (2019) cast. Smith became the first Black openly transgender man in a series regular role on network television when he was cast as firefighter Paul Strickland in FOX's 9-1-1: Lone Star (2020). Other appearances include NBC's Chicago P.D., HBO's Girls and Showtime's thriller Homeland.

=== Queen Sugar ===
In 2017, Smith was cast in the role of Officer Antoine "Toine" Wilkins on OWN's series Queen Sugar. Toine is a trans man. Executive-produced by Ava DuVernay and Oprah Winfrey, the Louisiana-set drama focuses on the lives and loves of the estranged Bordelon siblings. The show is based on the novel Queen Sugar by Natalie Baszile.

The role was one of Smith's first opportunities to play a transgender character and explore his own life experiences in his acting. As he has put it:

Toine and Ralph's relationship is much more reflective of the experiences I've had with long-time friends and I hadn't seen that on screen yet. I was excited at the thought of sharing this with people who may not know that they know trans people in their personal life.

In 2018, Ava Duvernay won a GLAAD Excellence in Media Award for her advocacy for inclusion of LGBT people in front of and behind the camera on her projects, particularly for creating Toine Wilkins and casting a transgender actor for the role.

In 2019, Smith was cast Showtime's drama series The L Word: Generation Q a follow-up to the original hit series, The L Word starring Jennifer Beals, Leisha Hailey and Kate Moennig. Smith played "'Pierce Williams', a buttoned-up, fastidious, expert political strategist and a veteran of LA politics. Unlike his colleagues, Williams is not quick to share details about his personal life, choosing to put all his energy into winning campaigns."

=== 9-1-1: Lone Star ===
In 2020, Smith was cast in 9-1-1: Lone Star as Paul Strickland, a transgender male firefighter. Through the role, Smith became the first Black openly trans man cast as a series regular on broadcast TV. In 2021, Smith's performance as Strickland was praised by People magazine, and he became the first trans man to be featured on their "Sexiest Man Alive" list. In 2022, Smith was featured again in People Magazine's "Sexiest Man Alive" list. Speaking on his second year of inclusion, Smith said, "My hope is that my visibility can encourage and empower others who want to be their full selves but are afraid or can't see a future for themselves, to take a step towards being who they are."

== Advocacy ==
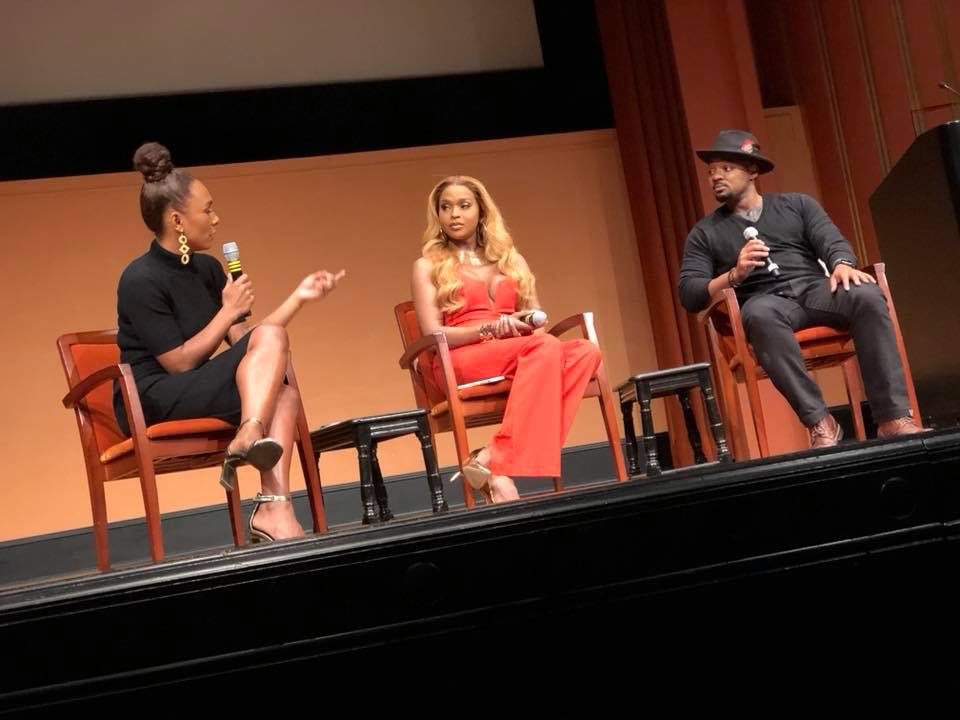
Brian Michael Smith, Janet Mock, and Amiyah Scott hold a panel discussion at the University of Michigan "My Life. My Story! Centering the Voices of Trans Lives" Event in February 2018.

Upon graduating from Kent State, Michael returned to Michigan and began teaching and mentoring youth through filmmaking through the Gear Up Program at the University of Michigan.

In New York, he continued his media literacy and mentoring programs with Wingspan Arts, Maysles Documentary Center and the Tribeca Film Institute's Tribeca Teaches Program. He discovered the importance of community and visibility while he worked with LGBT youth at the Manhattan LGBT Center.

On NBC News, Smith said: "I worked with young people and I just saw how important it was for young LGBT people, no matter where they were in their experience, to see what is down the road for them."

Since Queen Sugar, Smith has used his visibility and platforms to advocate for better trans representation in television and film and to encourage LGBTQ youth to create their own media. Smith publicly revealed he was transgender in 2017.

In February 2018, he was a special guest and panelist at the University of Michigan's 4th Annual Trotter House Lecture Series, My Life, My Story! Centering the Lives of Trans Voices event alongside Janet Mock and Amiyah Scott.

During NYC Pride he participated in the GLAAD Game Changers Panel in 2018 with Jamie Clayton and Amiyah Scott to discuss the changing landscape of transgender representation in television. In August 2018, Smith joined Laverne Cox, Trace Lysette, Jen Richards, Alexandra Billings and Chaz Bono in a Variety magazine's first Transgender in Hollywood Roundtable. The hour-long roundtable was released in conjunction with the August 7 print issue dedicated to trans representation and discrimination within Hollywood. During the discussion, Smith said: "We are artists and we want to create things and we want to have choice and our visibility should not cost us that choice."

In addition to public speaking, he continues to advocate through his art and to support trans narratives in television and film by participating in projects such as Sam Feder's documentary, Disclosure: Trans Lives on Screen released on June 19, 2020, by Netflix.

In June 2020, in honor of the 50th anniversary of the first LGBTQ Pride parade, Queerty named him among the fifty heroes "leading the nation toward equality, acceptance, and dignity for all people".

In July 2021, Smith joined the Human Rights Campaign's Board of Directors, the nation's largest LGBT-interest activist organization, to continue to advocate for social and legislative equality and protections for LGBTQ+ people.

== Filmography ==
Television & Film roles
Year	Title	Role	Notes
2015	Law & Order: Special Victims Unit	ConElectric Worker #2	Credited as Brian Michael, episode "Forgiving Rollins"
2015	Girls	Cop 1	Credited as Brian Michael
2016	The Detour	Firefighter	Credited as Brian Michael
2016	Person of Interest	Patrolman	Episode: "Reassortment", credited as Brian Michael
2016–2018	Blue Bloods	Officer Buckley, Hoffman's partner	4 episodes
2017	Chicago P.D.	Roland Garrett	Credited as Brian Michael, episode "Snitch"
2017–2022	Queen Sugar	Toine Wilkins	Recurring, credited as Brian Michael
2018	Homeland	EMT Nate	Credited as Brian Michael, episode "Like Bad at Things"
2018	Seven Seconds	Choir member	Credited as Brian Michael
2019	The L Word: Generation Q	Pierce Williams	Recurring
2020	Disclosure: Trans Lives on Screen	Himself	Documentary film
2021	.After	Jeremy Washington	7 episodes, credited as Brian Michael
2020–2025	9-1-1: Lone Star	Paul Strickland	Series regular
2025	King of Drag	Himself	1 episode, guest judge
