= NAACP Image Award for Outstanding Supporting Actress in a Drama Series =

American television award

This page lists the winners and nominees for the NAACP Image Award for Outstanding Supporting Actress in a Drama Series. The award was first given during the 1996 ceremony. Since its inception, Loretta Devine holds the record for the most wins with five.

== Winners and nominees ==
Winners are listed first and highlighted in bold.

=== 1990s ===
Year	Actress	Series	Ref.
1996
1996	**Fatima Faloye**	**New York Undercover**	
1996	Jasmine Guy	Melrose Place	
1996	C. C. H. Pounder	ER	
1996	Gloria Reuben	ER	
1996	Vanessa Estelle Williams	Murder One	
1997	—N/a		
1998
1998	**Lynn Whitfield**	**Touched by an Angel**	
1998	Lisa Nicole Carson	ER	
1998	C. C. H. Pounder	ER	
1998	Gloria Reuben	ER	
1998	Ja'net Dubois	Touched by an Angel	
1999
1999	**Ruby Dee**	**Promised Land**	
1999	Lisa Nicole Carson	Ally McBeal	
1999	Toni Lewis	Homicide: Life on the Street	
1999	Gloria Reuben	ER	

=== 2000s ===
Year	Actress	Series	Ref.
2000
2000	**Rosa Parks**	**Touched by an Angel**	
2000	LisaGay Hamilton	The Practice	
2000	Gloria Reuben	ER	
2000	Lucy Liu	Ally McBeal	
2000	Lisa Nicole Carson	Ally McBeal	
2001
2001	**Loretta Devine**	**Boston Public**	
2001	Beah Richards	The Practice	
2001	Michael Michele	ER	
2001	Irma P. Hall	Soul Food	
2001	Marla Gibbs	Touched by an Angel	
2002
2002	**Debbi Morgan**	**Soul Food**	
2002	Khandi Alexander	Law & Order: Special Victims Unit	
2002	Vanessa Bell Calloway	Boston Public	
2002	Rashida Jones	Boston Public	
2002	C. C. H. Pounder	Law & Order: Special Victims Unit	
2003
2003	**Loretta Devine**	**Boston Public**	
2003	Anna Deavere Smith	The West Wing	
2003	Kimberly Elise	Soul Food	
2003	Pam Grier	Law & Order: Special Victims Unit	
2003	Rita Moreno	Oz	
2004
2004	**Loretta Devine**	**Boston Public**	
2004	Vanessa Bell Calloway	The District	
2004	Anna Deavere Smith	The West Wing	
2004	Pam Grier	Law & Order: Special Victims Unit	
2004	Terri J. Vaughn	Soul Food	
2005
2005	**Khandi Alexander**	**CSI: Miami**	
2005	Diahann Carroll	Soul Food	
2005	Pam Grier	The L Word	
2005	Jasmine Guy	Dead Like Me	
2005	Sonja Sohn	The Wire	
2006
2006	**S. Epatha Merkerson**	**Law & Order**	
2006	Pam Grier	The L Word	
2006	Aisha Tyler	24	
2006	Kerry Washington	Boston Legal	
2006	Chandra Wilson	Grey's Anatomy	
2007
2007	**Chandra Wilson**	**Grey's Anatomy**	
2007	Khandi Alexander	CSI: Miami	
2007	Marianne Jean-Baptiste	Without a Trace	
2007	Sanaa Lathan	Nip/Tuck	
2007	S. Epatha Merkerson	Law & Order	
2008
2008	**Chandra Wilson**	**Grey's Anatomy**	
2008	Pam Grier	The L Word	
2008	Marianne Jean-Baptiste	Without a Trace	
2008	Audra McDonald	Private Practice	
2008	S. Epatha Merkerson	Law & Order	
2009
2009	**Angela Bassett**	**ER**	
2009	Audra McDonald	Private Practice	
2009	S. Epatha Merkerson	Law & Order	
2009	Sonja Sohn	The Wire	
2009	Alfre Woodard	My Own Worst Enemy	

=== 2010s ===
Year	Actress	Series	Ref.
2010
2010	**S. Epatha Merkerson**	**Law & Order**	
2010	Audra McDonald	Private Practice	
2010	Anika Noni Rose	The Ladies No. 1 Detective Agency	
2010	Jurnee Smollett	Friday Night Lights	
2010	Gabrielle Union	FlashForward	
2011
2011	**S. Epatha Merkerson**	**Law & Order**	
2011	Vanessa Bell Calloway	HawthoRNe	
2011	Sandra Oh	Grey's Anatomy	
2011	Sara Ramirez	Grey's Anatomy	
2011	Alfre Woodard	Memphis Beat	
2012
2012	**Archie Panjabi**	**The Good Wife**	
2012	Diahann Carroll	White Collar	
2012	Loretta Devine	Grey's Anatomy	
2012	Anika Noni Rose	Law & Order: Special Victims Unit	
2012	Alfre Woodard	Memphis Beat	
2013
2013	**Loretta Devine**	**Grey's Anatomy**	
2013	Joy Bryant	Parenthood	
2013	Lucy Liu	Southland	
2013	Archie Panjabi	The Good Wife	
2013	Rutina Wesley	True Blood	
2014
2014	**Taraji P. Henson**	**Person of Interest**	
2014	Debbie Allen	Grey's Anatomy	
2014	Diahann Carroll	White Collar	
2014	Archie Panjabi	The Good Wife	
2014	Vanessa Williams	666 Park Avenue	
2015
2015	**Khandi Alexander**	**Scandal**	
2015	Aja Naomi King	How to Get Away With Murder	
2015	Jada Pinkett Smith	Gotham	
2015	Chandra Wilson	Grey's Anatomy	
2015	Alfre Woodard	State of Affairs	
2016
2016	**Regina King**	**American Crime**	
2016	Grace Gealey	Empire	
2016	Danai Gurira	The Walking Dead	
2016	Naturi Naughton	Power	
2016	Cicely Tyson	How to Get Away with Murder	
2017
2017	**Naturi Naughton**	**Power**	
2017	C. C. H. Pounder	NCIS: New Orleans	
2017	Cicely Tyson	How to Get Away with Murder	
2017	Amirah Vann	Underground	
2017	Lynn Whitfield	Greenleaf	
2018
2018	**Naturi Naughton**	**Power**	
2018	Lynn Whitfield	Greenleaf	
2018	Samira Wiley	The Handmaid's Tale	
2018	Susan Kelechi Watson	This Is Us	
2018	Tina Lifford	Queen Sugar	

=== 2020s ===
Year	Actress	Series	Ref
2020
2020	**Lynn Whitfield**	**Greenleaf**	
2020	Tina Lifford	Queen Sugar	
2020	CCH Pounder	NCIS: New Orleans	
2020	Lyric Ross	This Is Us	
2020	Susan Kelechi Watson	This Is Us	
2021
2021	**Mary J. Blige**	**Power Book II: Ghost**	
2021	Adjoa Andoh	Bridgerton	
2021	Aunjanue Ellis	Lovecraft Country	
2021	Susan Kelechi Watson	This Is Us	
2021	Lynn Whitfield	Greenleaf	
2022
2022	**Mary J. Blige**	**Power Book II: Ghost**	
2022	Bianca Lawson	Queen Sugar	
2022	Susan Kelechi Watson	This Is Us	
2022	Chandra Wilson	Grey's Anatomy	
2022	Alfre Woodard	SEE	

== Multiple wins and nominations ==
=== Wins ===
5 wins

- Loretta Devine

3 wins

- S. Epatha Merkerson

2 wins

- Khandi Alexander
- Mary J. Blige
- Chandra Wilson
- Naturi Naughton

=== Nominations ===
6 nominations

- S. Epatha Merkerson

5 nominations

- Loretta Devine
- Pam Grier
- Lynn Whitfield
- Chandra Wilson
- Alfre Woodard

4 nominations

- Khandi Alexander
- C. C. H. Pounder
- Gloria Reuben
- Susan Kelechi Watson

3 nominations

- Vanessa Bell Calloway
- Diahann Carroll
- Lisa Nicole Carson
- Audra McDonald
- Archie Panjabi
- Naturi Naughton

2 nominations

- Khandi Alexander
- Mary J. Blige
- Anna Deavere Smith
- Jasmine Guy
- Marianne Jean-Baptiste
- Tina Lifford
- Lucy Liu
- Anika Noni Rose
- Sonja Sohn
- Cicely Tyson
