= Found (TV series) =

2023 American procedural drama television series

- Genre: Procedural drama; Crime drama; Mystery; Thriller
- Created by: Nkechi Okoro Carroll
- Showrunners: Nkechi Okoro Carroll; Sonay Hoffman
- Starring: Shanola Hampton; Kelli Williams; Brett Dalton; Gabrielle Walsh; Arlen Escarpeta; Karan Oberoi; Mark-Paul Gosselaar
- Composer: Sherri Chung
- Country of origin: United States
- Original language: English
- No. of seasons: 2
- No. of episodes: 35

Production
- Executive producers: Lindsay Dunn; Sarah Schechter; Greg Berlanti; Nkechi Okoro Carroll; Leigh Redman; Sonay Hoffman; DeMane Davis; David Madden
- Producers: Jon Wallace; Carl Ogawa; Jennifer Lence; Shanola Hampton; Zoe Marshall
- Running time: 42 minutes
- Production companies: Berlanti Productions; Rock My Soul Productions; Universal Television; Warner Bros. Television

Original release
- Network: NBC
- Release: October 3, 2023 – May 15, 2025

Found is an American procedural drama television series created by Nkechi Okoro Carroll that premiered on NBC on October 3, 2023, and concluded on May 15, 2025. The series focuses on public relations specialist and crisis manager Gabi Mosely and her team of associates who work to find missing people who have been ignored or forgotten by law enforcement and the mainstream media. It stars Shanola Hampton, who also serves as a producer. The series is produced by Berlanti Productions and Rock My Soul Productions in association with Warner Bros. Television and Universal Television.

In November 2023, the series was renewed for a second season which premiered on October 3, 2024. In May 2025, the series was canceled after two seasons.

Found has received nominations at the Astra TV Awards, Critics' Choice Television Awards, GLAAD Media Awards and NAACP Image Awards.

== Premise ==
Gabrielle "Gabi" Mosely, a public relations specialist and crisis manager, works alongside her team of associates to find missing people who have been overlooked by the system. Her team of experts consists of those who have either been kidnapped themselves or have a loved one that has been kidnapped. A kidnapping victim herself as a teenage girl, Gabi later secretly kidnaps the man who abducted her, Hugh "Sir" Evans, as revenge and keeps him locked up in her basement. Gabi uses Sir's knowledge as a kidnapper and criminal to help her solve cases.

== Cast ==
=== Main ===
- Shanola Hampton as Gabrielle "Gabi" Mosely, a former kidnapping victim who manages a crisis management firm named Mosely & Associates (M&A). The firm specializes in finding missing people that have been ignored or forgotten by law enforcement and the mainstream media. Twenty years after her initial kidnapping, Gabi abducts her kidnapper, Hugh "Sir" Evans, as revenge and holds him captive in her basement in order to get into the minds of kidnappers and understand their patterns. Gabi is also a public relations expert.
  - A'zaria Carter portrays young Gabi in flashbacks.
- Kelli Williams as Margaret Reed, an associate investigator at Mosely and Associates (M&A) with excellent observational and deductive reasoning skills that she has obtained while searching for her missing son Jamie, who disappeared from a local bus station 13 years ago. Every night after work, she returns to the bus station in hopes of finding Jamie or any information regarding his disappearance. Margaret's obsession with finding Jamie has led to a strained relationship with her two daughters Taylor and Rachel.
- Brett Dalton as Detective Mark Trent, a DC detective and Gabi's police liaison.
- Gabrielle Walsh as Lacey Quinn (formerly Bella Parker), a law school student who works at M&A as an intern. She was also kidnapped by Sir as a child and held in captivity with Gabi, where the two formed a close bond. After Gabi and Bella's escape from Sir, Bella changes her name to Lacey.
- Arlen Escarpeta as Zeke Wallace, a tech expert whose own past experience of being abducted by his uncle as a child has given him a debilitating case of agoraphobia. He provides Gabi with surveillance and hacking services and helps fund M&A with money from his trust fund.
- Karan Oberoi as Dhan Rana, a military veteran who was MIA and held captive for three years. He now acts as the association's security expert and enforcer when needed. He lives with his husband Ethan, who is a mental health professional.
- Mark-Paul Gosselaar as Hugh "Sir" Evans, a former high school English teacher and serial kidnapper who kidnapped Gabi and held her captive for one year and eight days. After Gabi's escape, Sir disappears and evades police and punishment for 20 years. Sir is eventually found and abducted by Gabi, who locks him in her basement and uses him to help solve some of her missing persons cases (though he would escape the basement at the end of the first season).

=== Recurring ===
- Lee Osorio as Ethan Rana, Dhan's husband
- Anisa Nyell Johnson as Detective Shaker, a DCPD detective and Trent's occasional partner.
- Dionne Gipson as Gina Parker (season 2), Lacey's mother
- Michael Cassidy as Christian Evans (season 2), Sir's brother, a grief counselor
- Danielle Savre as Heather Tollin (season 2), a mysterious and ambitious attorney who will become intimately involved in the lives of Gabi Mosely's team at M&A She is eventually revealed to be Sir's younger half-sister Lena, who aims to free her brother and destroy Gabi.
- Parker Queenan as Jamie Reed (season 2), Margaret's son who was kidnapped 13 years before the series. He reunites with her as an adult, and works to piece together the truth behind his abduction.
- Suehyla El-Attar Young as Carrie (season 2), a deranged woman who kidnapped Jamie as a child to replace her own son (who had been removed from her custody by CPS), then posed as a friend to Margaret in order to learn personal details about him and keep tabs on her search efforts.

== Episodes ==
=== Series overview ===
Season	Episodes	Originally released	
Season	Episodes	First released	Last released
1	13	October 3, 2023	January 16, 2024
2	22	October 3, 2024	May 15, 2025

=== Season 1 (2023–24) ===
No. overall	No. in season	Title	Directed by	Written by	Original release date	Prod. code	U.S. viewers (millions)	Rating/share (18-49)
1	1	"Pilot"	DeMane Davis	Nkechi Okoro Carroll	October 3, 2023	T74.10005	3.76	0.40/5
2	2	"Missing While Sinning"	DeMane Davis	Nkechi Okoro Carroll	October 10, 2023	T74.10102	3.29	0.33/4
3	3	"Missing While Widowed"	Nikhil Paniz	Cameron Johnson	October 17, 2023	T74.10103	3.28	0.35/4
4	4	"Missing While a Pawn"	Eif Rivera	Zoe Marshall	October 24, 2023	T74.10104	3.22	0.34/4
5	5	"Missing While Undocumented"	Jessika Borsiczky	Michael G. Peterson	October 31, 2023	T74.10105	2.82	0.27/3
6	6	"Missing While Addicted"	Nikhil Paniz	Jennifer A. King	November 7, 2023	T74.10106	2.80	0.25/3
7	7	"Missing While Indigenous"	Christine Swanson	Nikita DeMare	November 14, 2023	T74.10107	3.32	0.37/5
8	8	"Missing While Homeless"	Chad Lowe	Sonay Hoffman	November 21, 2023	T74.10108	3.04	0.30/4
9	9	"Missing While Scamming"	Charissa Sanjarernsuithikul	Cameron Johnson	November 28, 2023	T74.10109	3.27	0.32/4
10	10	"Missing While Indoctrinated"	Keesha Sharp	Zoe Marshall	December 5, 2023	T74.10110	2.96	0.29/4
11	11	"Missing While Interracial"	Michael Schultz	Michael G. Peterson	December 12, 2023	T74.10111	3.42	0.31/4
12	12	"Missing While Eccentric"	David McWhirter	Sonay Hoffman	January 9, 2024	T74.10112	2.42	0.26/3
13	13	"Missing While Forgotten"	Nikhil Paniz	Nkechi Okoro Carroll	January 16, 2024	T74.10113	2.30	0.26/3

=== Season 2 (2024–25) ===
No. overall	No. in season	Title	Directed by	Written by	Original release date	Prod. code	U.S. viewers (millions)	Rating/share (18-49)
14	1	"Missing While Bait"	Nikhil Paniz	Nkechi Okoro Carroll	October 3, 2024	T74.10201	2.51	0.22/3
15	2	"Missing While Difficult"	Crystle Roberson Dorsey	Jennifer A. King	October 10, 2024	T74.10202	2.40	0.23/3
16	3	"Missing While Lonely"	Michael Schultz	Cameron Johnson	October 17, 2024	T74.10203	2.01	0.18/2
17	4	"Missing While Perfect"	Kevin Berlandi	Sonay Hoffman	October 24, 2024	T74.10204	2.12	0.26/3
18	5	"Missing While Presumed Dead"	Elizabeth Allen Rosenbaum	Niceole R. Levy	October 31, 2024	T74.10205	2.25	0.20/3
19	6	"Missing While Gabi Mosely"	Keesha Sharp	Michael G. Peterson	November 7, 2024	T74.10206	1.93	0.21/2
20	7	"Missing While Hated"	Sudz Sutherland	Charli Engelhorn	November 14, 2024	T74.10207	1.97	0.20/2
21	8	"Missing While Haunted"	Kristin Windell	Nikita DeMare	November 21, 2024	T74.10208	2.27	0.22/2
22	9	"Missing While Targeted"	Charissa Sanjarernsuithikul	David Feige	January 16, 2025	T74.10209	2.52	0.29/4
23	10	"Missing While Outed"	Rob Hardy	Troy Kelly	January 23, 2025	T74.10210	2.71	0.24/4
24	11	"Missing While Misunderstood"	David McWhirter	Nkechi Okoro Carroll	January 30, 2025	T74.10211	2.17	0.21/3
25	12	"Missing While Misidentified"	Nikhil Paniz	Sonay Hoffman	February 13, 2025	T74.10212	2.19	0.18/3
26	13	"Missing While Grieving"	Kelli Williams	Jennifer A. King	February 20, 2025	T74.10213	2.29	0.25/3
27	14	"Missing While Matched"	Anthony Hardwick	Niceole R. Levy	February 27, 2025	T74.10214	2.12	0.22/4
28	15	"Missing While Seeking Asylum"	Michael Schultz	Michael G. Peterson	March 13, 2025	T74.10215	2.16	0.18/3
29	16	"Missing While Witnessed"	Keesha Sharp	Nikita DeMare	March 20, 2025	T74.10216	2.40	0.22/3
30	17	"Missing While Manipulated"	Mark-Paul Gosselaar	Charli Engelhorn	April 3, 2025	T74.10217	1.94	0.19/3
31	18	"Missing While Heather"	David McWhirter	David Feige	April 10, 2025	T74.10218	2.10	0.16/3
32	19	"Missing While a Casualty"	Jes Macallan	Troy Kelly	April 14, 2025	T74.10219	2.24	0.19/3
33	20	"Missing While Independent"	Nikhil Paniz	Sonay Hoffman	May 1, 2025	T74.10220	2.07	0.22/3
34	21	"Missing While a Family"	DeMane Davis	Michael G. Peterson & Jeremy Powell	May 8, 2025	T74.10221	2.20	0.23/3
35	22	"Missing While Dying"	Nikhil Paniz	Nkechi Okoro Carroll & Brianna Adams	May 15, 2025	T74.10222	2.21	0.21/3

== Production ==
=== Development ===
On August 23, 2019, it was announced that ABC had given a pilot commitment on Found, a drama from Warner Bros. Television and Berlanti Productions. In January 2022, it was announced that NBC had given a pilot order with the production company Rock My Soul Productions. Later in April 2022, it was announced that DeMane Davis would direct the pilot. On July 20, 2022, it was announced that NBC officially ordered the series. Greg Berlanti serves as an executive producer. On November 29, 2023, NBC renewed the series for a second season that will have 22 episodes. On May 9, 2025, NBC canceled the series after two seasons.

=== Casting ===
On March 2, 2022, it was announced that Shanola Hampton would be starring in the pilot in the role of Gabi Mosely. On April 29, 2022, it was announced Mark-Paul Gosselaar had joined the cast as Sir. On May 18, 2022, Kelli Williams joined the cast. On July 20, 2022, alongside the series order, it was announced that Arlen Escarpeta, Brett Dalton, Gabrielle Walsh and Karan Oberoi were all cast. On March 29, 2024, Dionne Gipson was cast in a recurring role for the second season. On May 15, 2024, Michael Cassidy joined the cast in a recurring capacity for the second season. On June 14, 2024, Danielle Savre was cast in a recurring role for the second season.

=== Filming ===
After the show was ordered to series, the rest of the first season began shooting in October 2022 and wrapped in March 2023. The first season of the series was filmed in Atlanta, Georgia, and consisted of 13 episodes. Filming for the second season began in early March 2024.

=== Music ===
On September 13, 2023, it was announced that Sherri Chung would compose the show's score.

== Release ==
The series premiered on NBC on October 3, 2023. It was originally set to premiere as a midseason replacement on February 19, 2023, but was delayed to fall 2023 by then NBCUniversal chairperson Susan Rosner Rovner. The series is available on the streaming service Peacock the day after it airs on NBC. The series airs on Citytv in Canada, the same day as it is simulcast in the United States. The pilot episode of Found then premiered on October 7, 2023, on USA Network. The second season premiered on October 3, 2024 on NBC. Internationally, the series is available to stream on Max.

Prior to its October debut, the series was first screened on June 17, 2023, at the American Black Film Festival. The pilot episode had its world premiere on September 23, 2023, at the Boston Film Festival.

== Reception ==
=== Ratings ===
As of October 11, 2023, the series premiere of Found was watched by 10.5 million viewers across all platforms and earned a 1.9 rating in the adults 18–49 key demographic. Within six days of release, Found became NBC's most successful series launch on Peacock. By November 2023, the series premiere was watched by over 20 million viewers with subsequent episodes of the first season averaging 7.4 million viewers after seven days of viewing across all platforms. In Live+7 Day Nielsen ratings, which exclude streaming numbers, the first season of Found averaged 4.99 million viewers and a 0.55 rating in the adults 18–49 key demographic.

During Found's second season, episodes averaged 6.2 million viewers and a 1.1 rating in the adults 18–49 key demographic after 35 days of viewing across all platforms.

=== Critical response ===
The review aggregator website Rotten Tomatoes reported a 70% approval rating with an average rating of 7/10, based on 10 critic reviews. The website's critical consensus reads, "Anchored by a very watchable Shanola Hampton, Found is an uneasy marriage of procedural and serialized storytelling that's slick enough to get lost in." Metacritic, which uses a weighted average, assigned a score of 49 out of 100 based on 6 critics, indicating "mixed or average reviews".

=== Accolades ===
At the 35th GLAAD Media Awards, Found was nominated for Outstanding New TV Series. At the 55th NAACP Image Awards, Found was nominated for Outstanding Drama Series and Nkechi Okoro Carroll was nominated for Outstanding Writing in a Dramatic Series.

Accolades received by Found
Award	Year	Category	Nominee(s)	Result	Ref.
Astra TV Awards	2024	Best Guest Actor in a Drama Series	Mark-Paul Gosselaar	Nominated	
Astra TV Awards	2024	Best Writing in a Broadcast Network or Cable Drama Series	Sonay Hoffman (for "Missing While Homeless")	Nominated	
Critics' Choice Television Awards	2025	Best Actress in a Drama Series	Shanola Hampton	Nominated	
Critics' Choice Television Awards	2025	Best Supporting Actor in a Drama Series	Mark-Paul Gosselaar	Nominated	
GLAAD Media Awards	2024	Outstanding New TV Series	Found	Nominated	
Gracie Awards	2024	Actress in a Leading Role – Drama	Shanola Hampton	Won	
NAACP Image Awards	2024	Outstanding Drama Series	Found	Nominated	
NAACP Image Awards	2024	Outstanding Writing in a Drama Series	Nkechi Okoro Carroll	Nominated	
NAACP Image Awards	2025	Outstanding Actress in a Drama Series	Shanola Hampton	Nominated	
NAACP Image Awards	2025	Outstanding Drama Series	Found	Nominated	
NAMIC Vision Awards	2024	Drama	Found	Won	
Saturn Awards	2025	Best Action / Thriller Television Series	Found	Nominated	
Women's Image Network Awards	2024	Drama Series	Found (for "Pilot")	Nominated	
Women's Image Network Awards	2024	Film / Show Producers	Nkechi Okoro Carroll (for "Pilot")	Nominated	
