= Undercovers (TV series) =

American action spy television series

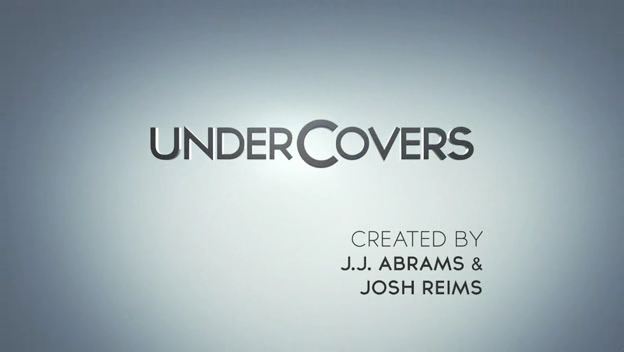
- Genre: Action; Drama
- Created by: J. J. Abrams; Josh Reims
- Starring: Gugu Mbatha-Raw; Boris Kodjoe; Ben Schwartz; Mekia Cox; Carter MacIntyre; Gerald McRaney
- Composers: Michael Giacchino; Chris Tilton; Andrea Datzman
- Country of origin: United States
- Original language: English
- No. of seasons: 1
- No. of episodes: 13 (2 unaired in the U.S.)

Production
- Executive producers: J. J. Abrams; Bryan Burk; Josh Reims
- Running time: 42 minutes
- Production companies: Warner Bros. Television; Bonanza Productions; Bad Robot; Good Butter Productions

Original release
- Network: NBC
- Release: September 22 – December 29, 2010

Undercovers is an American action spy television series created by J. J. Abrams and Josh Reims that aired on NBC from September 22 to December 29, 2010. They were executive producers of the pilot along with Abrams' frequent collaborator Bryan Burk.

Because of low ratings, the show was canceled on November 10, 2010, after only 10 episodes. Two episodes were unaired in the United States, but aired in Australia on January 2 and 9, 2012.

== Premise ==
Five years after leaving the CIA to open a catering company, Steven and Samantha Bloom are recruited back into the agency by Carlton Shaw. They take on special missions the average agent cannot handle. Having made a pact to never discuss their pasts with each other, the Blooms find surprising new things about each other in the course of each mission. They are aided by Leo Nash, a top agent who was once Samantha's boyfriend, and geeky computer expert Bill Hoyt, who worships Steven. Lizzy is Samantha's sister, a recovering alcoholic who helps run the catering business and is unaware of what the Blooms are really up to. The Blooms are unaware that Shaw has a secret agenda for reactivating them.

== Cast ==
- Gugu Mbatha-Raw as Samantha Bloom
- Boris Kodjoe as Steven Bloom
- Ben Schwartz as Bill Hoyt
- Mekia Cox as Lizzy Gilliam
- Carter MacIntyre as Leo Nash
- Gerald McRaney as Carlton Shaw

== Production ==
On May 3, 2010, Undercovers was officially ordered to series by NBC for a fall premiere, Wednesdays at 8/7c. Undercovers premiered on Wednesday, September 22, making it the second spy series produced by Alias executive producer Abrams.

Abrams directed the Undercovers pilot; it was the first time he had directed a pilot since 2004's Lost premiere and the first episode of television he has directed since a 2007 episode of The Office. Abrams said of the show, "This show does have ongoing stories as well but they are much more personal based and character based. But I'm trying to do a show that has a more fun energy and a little more [comedy]" And on his decision to direct the pilot, Abrams explained that "I just enjoyed the idea of it. I enjoy the script. I enjoyed the chemistry of these two people and it became clear as we were working on it, rather than be sitting on the set every day with someone else directing it, being annoying, I'd rather just take the burden on myself."

The show has been described as a "stand-alone adventure every week" and a "modernized Hart to Hart", although Abrams announced just before its cancellation that the show would be starting a serialized storyline concerning the true reasons for the Blooms' reactivation.

On November 10, 2010, after weeks of poor viewership and ratings, NBC canceled the series. The show's final three episodes aired in December 2010. Two episodes remain unaired, but NBC has no plans to broadcast them in the immediate future. Warner Home Video has not yet announced if the complete series will be released on DVD and/or Blu-ray. As of December 2020, all 13 episodes are currently available to watch free with ads on the streaming service Tubi.

In May 2011, all 13 episodes of the first season were premiered in the UK on Virgin Media as an On Demand program by WarnerTV.

In an interview, Abrams talked about the failure of the show:

"I've got to say, I feel like it was unfortunate. Of course, I completely blame myself for the entire thing. The conceit of the show was to do a much more frivolous, fun show, but ultimately, I think it was just too frivolous and too simple, and we didn't go deep enough. We were really desperately trying to stay away from mythology and complexity and intensity and too much serious, dark storytelling and, ultimately, that's not necessarily what I do best. I think audiences felt that it was a little bit lacking. I see that and completely take responsibility for its failing".

Many members of Undercovers' writing staff went on to become successful showrunners of other shows, including Karin Gist (Star and Mixed-ish), Anthony Sparks (Queen Sugar), Elwood Reid (The Bridge), and Phil Klemmer (Legends of Tomorrow).

== Episodes ==
| No. | Title | Directed by | Written by | Original release date | Prod. code | U.S. viewers (millions) |
|---|---|---|---|---|---|---|
| 1 | "Pilot" | J. J. Abrams | J. J. Abrams & Josh Reims | September 22, 2010 | 296768 | 8.57 |
Married and retired CIA agents Steven and Samantha Bloom are reinstated when a close friend of theirs goes missing.
| 2 | "Instructions" | Stephen Williams | J. J. Abrams & Josh Reims | September 29, 2010 | 2J5452 | 7.24 |
Carlton asks the Blooms to find Dayita Nasir, a doctor that has recently been kidnapped.
| 3 | "Devices" | Tucker Gates | J. J. Abrams & Josh Reims | October 6, 2010 | 2J5453 | 6.38 |
The Blooms go to Berlin to retrieve a code-breaking device.
| 4 | "Jailbreak" | Anthony Hemingway | Phil Klemmer | October 13, 2010 | 2J5455 | 5.93 |
The Blooms travel to Ireland and then England in their endeavor to find a very important CIA hard drive, which has gone missing.
| 5 | "Not Without My Daughter" | Dan Attias | Elwood Reid | October 20, 2010 | 2J5454 | 5.90 |
The Blooms are assigned with finding and instigating the defection of a North Korean physicist, who has invented a device capable of changing an object's matter.
| 6 | "Xerxes" | Stephen Williams | Michael Foley | October 27, 2010 | 2J5456 | 5.45 |
The Blooms are shipped off to Tuscany, with the task of capturing Xerxes, along with a painting in which he has concealed a formula for a biological weapon.
| 7 | "Assassin" | Brad Anderson | Karin Gist | November 3, 2010 | 2J5457 | 5.91 |
The Blooms and Leo head out to Peru to thwart an assassination plot against president-elect Alberto Loya. Meanwhile, Lizzy caters a party for one of Samantha's college friends.
| 8 | "Crashed" | Rosemary Rodriguez | Anthony Sparks | November 10, 2010 | 2J5458 | 5.13 |
When a pilot with a bomb for cargo disappears, the Blooms are challenged with locating the man and the bomb he has with him. Meanwhile, Shaw worries about the Blooms and Lizzie takes control with a client.
| 9 | "A Night to Forget" | Frederick E. O. Toye | Alex Katsnelson | December 1, 2010 | 2J5459 | 4.82 |
The Blooms travel to Mexico to help Leo discover why he can't remember the previous night, which ended with a dead woman in his hotel room.
| 10 | "Funny Money" | Jonas Pate | Tracy Bellomo | December 22, 2010 | 2J5460 | 4.21 |
When $100 bill engraving plates are stolen from the Secret Service, the Blooms have to consult an expert, Steven's brother. The thief is betrayed by his brother, who assists the CIA. Meanwhile, Lizzy declines a manager position at the catering business and decides to go on tour with her new boyfriend.
| 11 | "The Key to It All" | Tucker Gates | Phil Klemmer | December 29, 2010 | 2J5461 | 4.46 |
The Blooms go on vacation, fully paid by the CIA, but they are called for an emergency in Tel Aviv. After an agent is killed in a hostage situation, Samantha is forced to open her deceased professor's locker. Throughout the mission, the Blooms become increasingly suspicious of Shaw's intentions for reactivating them.
| 12 | "Dark Cover" | Jeff Thomas | Elwood Reid | January 2, 2012 (Australia) | 2J5462 | N/A |
After a chance meeting with a former criminal accomplice, Steven resumes his former bad guy cover in an attempt to foil a plot to release a deadly smallpox virus.
| 13 | "The Reason" | Stephen Williams | Michael Foley | January 9, 2012 (Australia) | 2J5463 | N/A |
Steven and Samantha uncover the startling real reason they were brought back into the CIA - to lure out and capture Samantha's mentor (Joseph), who revealed to be alive after he faked his death in the car explosion, when they find themselves fighting for their lives on a mission to Dubai.

== Reception ==
The series holds a 39% approval rating on review aggregator Rotten Tomatoes, based on 33 critic reviews. The website's critics consensus reads, "Visually sharp but narratively undercooked, Undercovers is occasionally fun but lacks the dramatic tension needed to pull off its blend of action and comedy." On Metacritic, which uses a weighted average, the series holds a score of 63/100 based on 27 critics, indicating "generally favorable" reviews.
