= Mike (miniseries) =

2022 American miniseries

- Promotional release poster
- Genre: Biographical drama; Sports drama
- Created by: Steven Rogers
- Starring: Trevante Rhodes; Russell Hornsby
- Composer: Peter Nashel
- Country of origin: United States
- Original language: English
- No. of seasons: 1
- No. of episodes: 8

Production
- Executive producers: Karin Gist; Claire Brown; Craig Gillespie; Steven Rogers; Bryan Unkeless; Scott Morgan; Tom Ackerley; Margot Robbie; Josey McNamara; Darin Friedman; Brett Hedbolm; Anthony Hemingway; Anthony Sparks; Samantha Corbin-Miller; Trevante Rhodes
- Producers: Jason Roberts; Thane Watkins
- Running time: 32 minutes
- Production companies: Anthony Hemingway Productions; The Gist of It; LuckyChap Entertainment; Clubhouse Pictures; Entertainment 360; 20th Television

Original release
- Network: Hulu
- Release: August 25 – September 15, 2022

Mike is an American television miniseries created by Steven Rogers. The series is an unauthorized look at the life of boxer Mike Tyson, with Trevante Rhodes as the title role, and co-stars Russell Hornsby. Rogers reunites with numerous collaborators from the film I, Tonya (2017), including director Craig Gillespie, and executive producers Tom Ackerley, Margot Robbie, and Bryan Unkeless. It premiered on Hulu on August 25, 2022. The series received mixed reviews from critics, and was criticized by Tyson for being made without his involvement nor compensation.

== Cast ==
=== Main ===
- Trevante Rhodes as Mike Tyson
- Russell Hornsby as Don King

=== Recurring ===
- Harvey Keitel as Cus D'Amato
- Laura Harrier as Robin Givens
- Grace Zabriskie as Camille D'Amato
- Oluniké Adeliyi as Lorna Mae, the mother of Mike Tyson
- TJ Atoms as Barkim, a friend
- Li Eubanks as Desiree Washington

== Episodes ==
Eight episodes have been announced.

No.	Title	Directed by	Written by	Original release date
1	"Thief"	Craig Gillespie	Steven Rogers	August 25, 2022
2	"Monster"	Craig Gillespie	Steven Rogers	August 25, 2022
3	"Lover"	Craig Gillespie	Keisha Zollar	September 1, 2022
4	"Meal Ticket"	Craig Gillespie	Darnell Brown	September 1, 2022
5	"Desiree"	Tiffany Johnson	Karin Gist & Samantha Corbin-Miller	September 8, 2022
6	"Jailbird"	Tiffany Johnson	Samantha Corbin-Miller	September 8, 2022
7	"Cannibal"	Director X	Mando Alvarado	September 15, 2022
8	"Phoenix"	Director X	Anthony Sparks	September 15, 2022

== Release ==
Mike premiered on Hulu in the United States on August 25, 2022. Internationally, the series was released on Disney+.

== Reception ==
=== Critical reception ===
The review aggregator website Rotten Tomatoes reported a 43% approval rating based on 35 critic reviews, with an average rating of 6.30/10. The website's critics consensus reads, "This unauthorized biopic of The Baddest Man on the Planet is undeniably ambitious as it weighs the legendary boxer's many contradictions, but it ultimately punches itself out with uneven execution." Metacritic, which uses a weighted average, assigned a score of 54 out of 100 based on 22 critic reviews, indicating "mixed or average reviews".

==== Reaction from Mike Tyson ====
Mike Tyson publicly criticized Hulu over the production of Mike, claiming Hulu created the project without his permission or compensation. On social media, he accused Hulu of "stealing" his life story, comparing them to "slave masters," and expressed frustration that UFC President Dana White was offered millions to promote the series while he received nothing. Tyson condemned Hulu's decision to announce the series during Black History Month, calling it a prime example of corporate greed and cultural misappropriation. The show's showrunner, Karen Gist, addressed the project's unauthorized nature, stating it aimed to challenge public perceptions of Tyson.

=== Accolades ===
The series was one of 200 television series that received the ReFrame Stamp for the years 2022 to 2023. The stamp is awarded by the gender equity coalition ReFrame and industry database IMDbPro for film and television projects that are proven to have gender-balanced hiring, with stamps being awarded to projects that hire female-identifying people, especially women of color, in four out of eight key roles for their production.

Year	Award	Category	Nominee(s)	Result	Ref.
2023	Canadian Society of Cinematographers Awards	Best Cinematography in TV Series - Half Hour Scripted	Brendan Uegama	Nominated	
2023	NAACP Image Awards	Outstanding Actor in a Television Movie, Limited Series or Dramatic Special	Trevante Rhodes	Nominated	
2023	NAACP Image Awards	Outstanding Supporting Actor in a Television Movie, Limited Series or Dramatic Special	Russell Hornsby	Nominated	
2024	Black Reel TV Awards	Outstanding Supporting Performance in a TV Movie/Limited Series	Russell Hornsby	Nominated	
