= Nicholas L. Ashe =

American actor

- Born: April 21, 1995 (age 31); New York City, New York, U.S.
- Occupation: Actor
- Years active: 2012–Present

Nicholas L. Ashe (born April 21, 1995) is an American actor. He is known for starring as Micah West in the drama series Queen Sugar.

== Early life ==
In 2012, Ashe made his acting breakthrough on the television series Are We There Yet?

== Career ==
Around 2012, Ashe appeared on the final season of Are We There Yet? Afterwards, he appeared in Philly Lawyer and the comedy Songbyrd. In 2016, he made his feature film debut starring in the movie Custody with Viola Davis, which got him selected to play the role of Micah West in Queen Sugar. In 2017, he directed and wrote his short film Last Looks.

== Personal life ==
Ashe is queer and was in a relationship with the actor Justice Smith in 2020. In April 2021, Smith told an interviewer that they were no longer together, but they had reunited by later that year, shooting a Calvin Klein campaign video together in mid-2022.

== Filmography ==
=== Film ===
Year	Title	Role	Refs
2012	Philly Lawyer	unknown	
2016	Custody	Elliot Schulman	
2017	Last Looks	Directed / Wrote	
2018	Bricked	Gavin Matthews	
2022	The Spirit God Gave Us	Malcolm	

=== Television ===
Year	Title	Role	Refs
2012	Are We There Yet?	Quentin	
2014	Songbyrd	Young Artist	
2016–2022	Queen Sugar	Micah West	
2017–2022	The Talk	Guest	
2022	AfroPop: The Ultimate Cultural Exchange	Host	

== Theatrical performances ==
Year	Title	Role	Refs
2004	The Lion King	Young Simba	
2013–2019	Choir Boy	Junior Davis	
2015–2022	Kill Floor	B	
2022	The Inheritance	Adam/Leo	

== Awards and nominations ==
Year	Awards	Category	Recipient	Outcome
2019	Black Reel Awards	Outstanding Supporting Actor, Drama Series	Queen Sugar	Winner
