= Anthony Sparks =

American television showrunner, writer-producer, and playwright

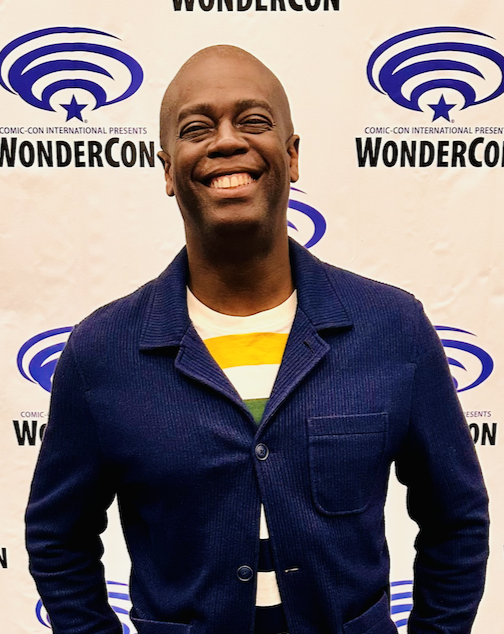
Sparks at the 2023 WonderCon

Anthony Sparks is an American television showrunner, writer-producer, and playwright. He is also an essay writer who focuses on media, performance, and African American politics and culture. He has a Ph.D. in American studies & ethnicity from USC and began his career as an actor in classical acting and was also a lead performer in New York in the show Stomp and in the Emmy-winning HBO film Stomp Out Loud.

Sparks is also an educator in film, television, African American studies, and American studies. He has taught screenwriting and cultural studies at USC, Occidental College, and California State University, Fullerton.

== Education ==
Originally from the South Side of Chicago, Sparks attended the Whitney Young Academic Center and Whitney Young Magnet High School. He graduated cum laude and with several honors (including the Jack Nicholson Award for Outstanding Undergraduate in the School of Dramatic Arts) from the University of Southern California where he studied theatre, film, cultural studies, and anthropology. He also earned his master's degree at USC, and completed a Ph.D. degree from USC in American Studies and Ethnicity. He was also a Fellow at the USC Center for American Studies for several years.

Sparks is an alumnus of the Warner Bros. Television Writing Workshop, The ABC-Disney Television Writing Fellowship, and the 2017 WGA Showrunners Training Program.

== Career ==
=== Acting ===
Sparks began his career as an actor, working in regional theaters and Off-Broadway (i.e. Old Globe Theatre, Crossroads Theater, New York's The Public Theater), and appeared for five years as the comedic lead in New York and the Broadway tour of the theatre show, STOMP. He also appeared in the Emmy-winning HBO film, Stomp Out Loud.

=== Writing and producing ===
Among his plays, Ghetto Punch has appeared in several venues across the country and was featured in American Theatre magazine.

His television writing credits include the NBC J.J. Abrams series Undercovers, the Freeform cop & family drama series, Lincoln Heights, and the CBS cop drama The District. He was also a writer and producer on the NBC drama, The Blacklist. He is the longtime showrunner and executive producer of the television drama Queen Sugar. More recently, he signed a first look deal with Blumhouse Television, where Sparks is developing several projects.

In addition to recently developing and selling several drama series with studios and networks such as Disney+, Lionsgate, Legendary Television, and Netflix, among others, Sparks has also written for and executive produced the Hulu drama Mike and the Peacock series Bel-Air.

In May 2025, Sparks was announced as the creator, showrunner, and executive producer on the 7th Heaven reboot in development at CBS Studios.

== Awards and recognition ==
Anthony Sparks received a 2022 Humanitas Prize nomination in the television drama teleplay category for writing the "May 27, 2020" episode of Queen Sugar. Sparks wrote the episode in response to the murder of George Floyd in May 2020. The teleplay shows the Bordelon characters grappling with the reality of violence against African Americans. As showrunner and executive producer of Queen Sugar, Sparks also received the 2022 NAACP Image Award for Outstanding Drama (alongside fellow producers Oprah Winfrey & Ava DuVernay) for his and his team's work on the 5th and 6th seasons of Queen Sugar.

In 2020, Sparks received the Television Academy Honors Award for his work as the showrunner, executive producer, and head writer on the 4th season of Queen Sugar.

In addition to his 2022 Image Award win, Sparks has been nominated for an additional four individual category NAACP Image Awards over the course of his writing career. In 2018 he was nominated for Outstanding Writing in Television Drama for the Queen Sugar (OWN) second-season episode "What Do I Care for Morning". This was his second consecutive nomination in this category and his third overall Image Award nomination for Outstanding Television Drama Writing. He was also nominated in 2020, 2019, 2018, 2017 as part of the Queen Sugar producing team for Outstanding Television Drama. In addition to his nominations as a television writer/producer for two 2017 NAACP Image Awards, Sparks also received a third 2017 nomination for Outstanding Literature/Instructional Book for writing & co-editing an academic book, Running the Long Race in Gifted Education.

Sparks also received individual 2008 and 2009 Sentinel Health Awards from the Norman Lear Center for his work as a television writer, as well as a 2008 NAACP Image Award nomination for Outstanding Dramatic Writing in a Television Series and a 2010 NAACP Image Award as a producer for Outstanding Dramatic Television Series.

== Volunteer and advocacy work ==
Anthony Sparks is a member of several civic and entertainment industry boards. He serves on the Board of Advisors for Hollywood, Health & Society at the USC Annenberg Norman Lear Center. He also serves on the Board of Managers at the Collins & Katz Family YMCA, as well as on the Board of Councilors at the USC School of Dramatic Arts.

In March 2024, the USC School of Dramatic Arts named and opened The Sparks Center for Community and Culture to acknowledge and honor the committed and collective work that USC SDA Associate Dean Anita Dashiell-Sparks and Anthony Sparks have deeply engaged and demonstrated throughout their life and careers in arts, entertainment, and education.
