= NAACP Image Award for Outstanding Writing in a Dramatic Series =

American television award

This article lists the winners and nominees for the NAACP Image Award for Outstanding Writing in a Drama Series. The award was first given during the 2007 ceremony and since its conception, Shonda Rhimes holds the record for the most wins with five and is currently the only writer to win in this category more than once.

== Winners and nominees ==
Winners are listed first and highlighted in bold.

=== 2000s ===
Year	Writer	Series	Episode	Ref
2007
2007	**Shonda Rhimes**	**Grey's Anatomy**	**"It's the End of the World"**	
2007	Steven Maeda	Day Break	"What if He Lets Her Go"	
2007	Aaron Rahsaan Thomas	Friday Night Lights	"Full Hearts"	
2007	Naren Shankar	CSI: Crime Scene Investigation	"Killer"	
2007	Janine Sherman Barrois	ER	"Darfur"	
2008
2008	**Shonda Rhimes and Krista Vernoff**	**Grey's Anatomy**	**"A Change is Gonna Come"**	
2008	Natalie Chaidez	Heroes	"The Fix"	
2008	Kathleen McGhee-Anderson and Anthony Sparks	Lincoln Heights	"The Vision"	
2008	Shonda Rhimes	Private	"In Which We Meet Addison, a Nice Girl From Somewhere Else"	
2008	Janine Sherman Barrois	ER	"Breach of Trust"	
2009
2009	**Shonda Rhimes**	**Grey's Anatomy**	**"Freedom" (Parts I and II)**	
2009	Liz Friedman and Sara Hess	House	"Lucky Thirteen"	
2009	Kathleen McGhee-Anderson	Lincoln Heights	"Glass House"	
2009	Aaron Rahsaan Thomas	Friday Night Lights	"Leave No One Behind"	
2009	Janine Sherman Barrois	ER	"Parental Guidance"	

=== 2010s ===
Year	Writer	Series	Episode	Ref
2010
2010	**Shonda Rhimes**	**Grey's Anatomy**	**"What a Difference a Day Makes"**	
2010	Zoanne Clack	Grey's Anatomy	"Stand By Me"	
2010	Sara Hess	House	"The Greater Good"	
2010	Kathleen McGhee-Anderson	Lincoln Heights	"Home Again"	
2010	Alexander Woo	True Blood	"Beyond Here Lies Nothin'"	
2011
2011	**Shonda Rhimes**	**Private Practice**	**"Did You Hear What Happened to Charlotte King?"**	
2011	Leyani Diaz and Vanessa Rojas	The Event	"Loyalty"	
2011	Judy McCreary	Law & Order: Special Victims Unit	"Disabled"	
2011	Janine Sherman Barrois	Criminal Minds	"Remembrance of Things Past"	
2011	Alexander Woo	True Blood	"It Hurts Me Too"	
2012
2012	**Lolis Eric Elie**	**Treme**	**"Santa Claus, Do You Ever Get the Blues?"**	
2012	Zoanne Clack	Grey's Anatomy	"I Will Survive"	
2012	Cheo Hodari Coker	Southland	"Punching Water"	
2012	Janine Sherman Barrois	Criminal Minds	"The Bittersweet Science"	
2012	Pam Veasey	Ringer	"Oh Gawd, There's Two of Them?"	
2013
2013	**Cheo Hodari Coker**	**Southland**	**"God's Work"**	
2013	Zoanne Clack	Grey's Anatomy	"This Magic Moment"	
2013	Shonda Rhimes	Grey's Anatomy	"Flight"	
2013	Shonda Rhimes	Scandal	"Sweet Baby"	
2013	Janine Sherman Barrois	Criminal Minds	"The Pact"	
2014
2014	**Janine Sherman Barrois**	**Criminal Minds**	**"Strange Fruit"**	
2014	Karin Gist	Revenge	"Mercy"	
2014	Sara Hess	Orange Is the New Black	"Blood Donut"	
2014	Damian Kindler and Chitra Elizabeth Sampath	Sleepy Hollow	"Sanctuary"	
2014	Aaron Rahsaan Thomas	Southland	"Babel"	
2015
2015	**Erika Green Swafford**	**How to Get Away with Murder**	**"Let's Get to Scooping"**	
2015	Mara Brock Akil	Being Mary Jane	"Uber Love"	
2015	Zoanne Clack	Grey's Anatomy	"You Be Illin'"	
2015	Warren Leight and Julie Martin	Law & Order: Special Victims Unit	"American Disgrace"	
2015	Zahir McGhee	Scandal	"Mama Said Knock You Out"	
2016
2016	**Mara Brock Akil, Jameal Turner and Keli Goff**	**Being Mary Jane**	**"Sparrow"**	
2016	Lee Daniels	Empire	"Pilot"	
2016	Erika Green Swafford and Doug Stockstill	How to Get Away with Murder	"Mama's Here Now"	
2016	LaToya Morgan	Turn: Washington's Spies	"False Flag"	
2016	John Ridley	American Crime	"Episode 1"	
2017
2017	**Ava DuVernay**	**Queen Sugar**	**"First Things First"**	
2017	Joe Robert Cole	The People v. O. J. Simpson: American Crime Story	"The Race Card"	
2017	Akela Cooper	Luke Cage	"Manifest"	
2017	LaToya Morgan	Turn: Washington's Spies	"Benediction"	
2017	Anthony Sparks	Queen Sugar	"By Any Chance"	
2018
2018	**Gina Prince-Bythewood**	**Shots Fired**	"**Hour One: Pilot"**	
2018	Anthony Sparks	Queen Sugar	"What Do I Care For Morning"	
2018	Ava DuVernay	Queen Sugar	"Dream Variations"	
2018	Erica L. Anderson	Greenleaf	"The Bear"	
2018	Vera Herbert	This Is Us	"Still Here"	
2019
2019	**Kay Oyegun**	**This Is Us**	**"This Big, Amazing, Beautiful Life"**	
2019	Janine Sherman Barrois	Claws	"Cracker Casserole"	
2019	Lena Waithe	The Chi	"Pilot"	
2019	Patrick Joseph Charles	Black Lightning	"Sins of the Father: The Book of Redemption"	
2019	Lena Waithe & Dime Davis	The Chi	"The Whistle"	

=== 2020s ===
Year	Writer	Series	Episode	Ref
2020
2020	**Nichelle Tramble Spellman**	**Truth Be Told**	**"Monster"**	
2020	Nkechi Okoro Carroll	All American	"Hussle & Motivate"	
2020	Pat Charles	Black Lightning	"The Book of Secrets: Chapter One: Prodigal Son"	
2020	Damon Lindelof & Cord Jefferson	Watchmen	"This Extraordinary Being"	
2020	Ava DuVernay & Michael Starrbury	When They See Us	"Part Four"	
2021
2021	**Attica Locke**	**Little Fires Everywhere**	**"The Spider Web"**	
2021	Erika L. Johnson & Mark Richard	The Good Lord Bird	"A Wicked Plot"	
2021	Jessica Lamour	Little Voice	"Love Hurts"	
2021	Katori Hall	P-Valley	"Perpetratin"	
2021	Tanya Barfield	Mrs. America	"Shirley"	
2022
2022	**Davita Scarlett**	**The Good Fight**	**"And the Firm Had Two Partners"**	
2022	Nkechi Okoro Carroll	All American	"Homecoming"	
2022	Malcolm Spellman	The Falcon and the Winter Soldier	"New World Order"	
2022	Aurin Squire	Evil	"C Is for Cop"	
2022	Steven Canals, Janet Mock, Our Lady J, Brad Falchuk, Ryan Murphy	Pose	"Series Finale"	

== Multiple wins and nominations ==
=== Wins ===
5 wins

- Shonda Rhimes

=== Nominations ===
8 nominations

- Janine Sherman Barrois

7 nominations

- Shonda Rhimes

4 nominations

- Zoanne Clack

3 nominations

- Ava DuVernay
- Sara Hess
- Kathleen McGhee-Anderson
- Aaron Rahsaan Thomas
- Anthony Sparks

2 nominations

- Mara Brock Akil
- Nkechi Okoro Carroll
- Patrick Joseph Charles
- Erika Green Swafford
- Cheo Hodari Coker
- LaToya Morgan
- Pam Veasey
- Lena Waithe
- Alexander Woo
