= Steven Rogers (screenwriter) =

American screenwriter

Steven Rogers is an American screenwriter. He is best known for writing and producing the 2017 sports biopic I, Tonya, and for writing the romantic comedies Kate & Leopold and Hope Floats. He created the 2022 miniseries Mike about the life of boxer Mike Tyson.

== Background and education ==
Rogers was born in Seattle, Washington. He is a graduate of Sanford Meisner’s Neighborhood Playhouse, in New York City.

== Career ==
Rogers has written the screenplays for a number of films, including Hope Floats (1998), Stepmom (1998), Kate & Leopold (2001), P.S. I Love You (2007), and Love the Coopers (2015).

In 2017, he wrote and produced a biographical dark comedy about Tonya Harding titled I, Tonya. It stars Margot Robbie, Sebastian Stan, and Allison Janney and was directed by Craig Gillespie. For his script, Rogers earned nominations for the BAFTA Award for Best Original Screenplay and Writers Guild of America Award for Best Original Screenplay.
