= Kofi Siriboe =

American actor and model (born 1994)

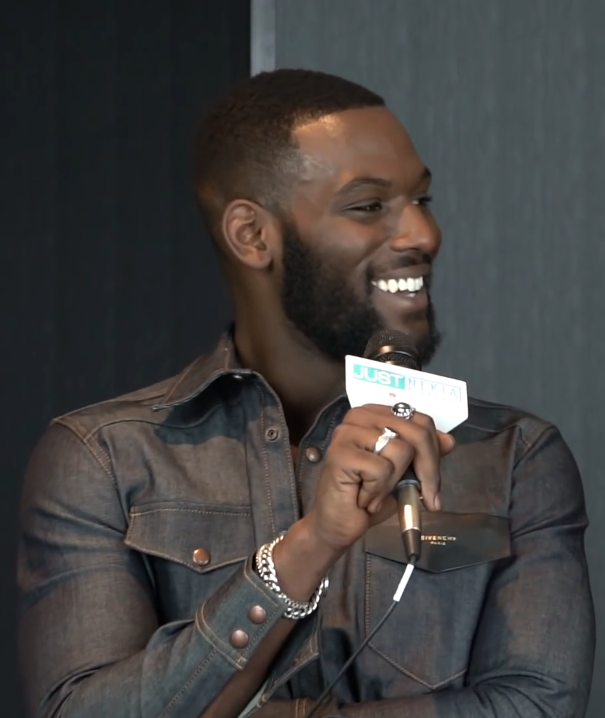
- Siriboe in 2016
- Born: Nana-Kofi Siriboe; March 2, 1994 (age 32); Los Angeles, California, U.S.
- Occupations: Actor, model
- Years active: 2003–present
- Relatives: Kwesi Boakye (brother)

Nana-Kofi Siriboe (born March 2, 1994) is an American actor and model. He is best known for his role as Ralph Angel Bordelon on the television series Queen Sugar (2016–2022). He has also appeared in films such as The Longshots (2008) and Girls Trip (2017).

== Life and career ==
Born Nana-Kofi Siriboe in Los Angeles, California to Ghanaian parents, Koshie Mills and Kwame Siriboe. He is the middle child and has two brothers, actors Kwame Boateng and Kwesi Boakye. As a model, Siriboe signed with Wilhelmina Models and Vision Los Angeles. He made his professional acting debut in the film The Longshots (2008). He later appeared in the films Prom (2011), Whiplash (2014), Straight Outta Compton (2015), and Kicks (2016). On television, he had a recurring role on the comedy-drama series Awkward from 2014 to 2015.

Since 2016, Siriboe has starred on the drama series Queen Sugar, for which he gained attention and three consecutive NAACP Image Award nominations. He was subsequently cast in the hit film Girls Trip (2017).

== Filmography ==
=== Film ===
Year	Title	Role	Notes
2003	Strange & Charmed	Benjamin	Short film
2008	The Longshots	Javy Hall	
2009	40	Teenage Godwill	
2011	Prom	Max	
2014	Whiplash	Greg	
2015	Straight Outta Compton	Block Dude	
2015	Knotts	Michael	Short film
2016	Kicks	Flaco	
2017	Girls Trip	Malik	
2018	Jump	Ziggy	Short film
2020	Really Love	Isaiah	
2024	Meet Me Next Christmas	James	

=== Television ===
Year	Title	Role	Notes
2007	Entourage	Teenager (uncredited)	Episode: "Dog Day Afternoon"
2009	Lincoln Heights	JJ	Episode: "Bully for You"
2012	CSI: Crime Scene Investigation	James Newman	Episode: "Fallen Angels"
2014–15	Awkward	Tyler Miller	Recurring role, 11 episodes
2016	Snowfall	Kevin Hamilton	Episode: "Pilot"
2016–2022	Queen Sugar	Ralph Angel Bordelon	Main role, 76 episodes
2021	Insecure	Crenshawn	Episode: "Growth, Okay?!"
2025	Harlem	Seth	Recurring role
2025	BMF	Sheik Mooney Bey	Episode: "Bad Religion"

=== Music videos ===
Year	Title	Performer	Ref.
2021	"Streets"	Doja Cat	

== Awards and nominations ==
Year	Awards	Category	Nominated work	Result	Ref.
2017	NAACP Image Awards	Outstanding Actor in a Drama Series	Queen Sugar	Nominated	
2017	Black Reel Awards for Television	Outstanding Actor, Drama Series	Queen Sugar	Nominated	
2018	NAACP Image Awards	Outstanding Actor in a Drama Series	Queen Sugar	Nominated	
2018	Black Reel Awards for Television	Outstanding Actor, Drama Series	Queen Sugar	Nominated	
2019	Black Reel Awards	Outstanding Short Film	Jump	Nominated	
2019	Black Reel Awards	Outstanding Short Film	WTFIMH: What the Fuck is Mental Health	Nominated	
2019	Black Reel Awards for Television	Outstanding Actor, Drama Series	Queen Sugar	Nominated	
2019	NAACP Image Awards	Outstanding Actor, Drama Series	Queen Sugar	Nominated	
2020	Black Reel Awards for Television	Outstanding Actor, Drama Series	Queen Sugar	Nominated	
2020	NAACP Image Awards	Outstanding Actor, Drama Series	Queen Sugar	Nominated	
2022	NAACP Image Awards	Outstanding Actor, Drama Series	Queen Sugar	Nominated	
