= Queen Sugar =

2016 American drama television series by Ava DuVernay

- Genre: Drama
- Created by: Ava DuVernay
- Based on: Queen Sugar by Natalie Baszile
- Starring: Rutina Wesley; Dawn-Lyen Gardner; Kofi Siriboe; Nicholas L. Ashe; Omar Dorsey; Dondre Whitfield; Timon Kyle Durrett; Greg Vaughan; Ethan Hutchison; Marycarmen Lopez; Tina Lifford; Bianca Lawson; Henry G. Sanders; Walter Perez; Tammy Townsend
- Theme music composer: Meshell Ndegeocello
- Country of origin: United States
- Original language: English
- No. of seasons: 7
- No. of episodes: 89

Production
- Executive producers: Ava DuVernay; Anthony Sparks; Melissa Carter; Oprah Winfrey
- Running time: 37–65 minutes
- Production companies: Warner Horizon Television; Harpo Films; Forward Movement; Array Filmworks (Season 4)

Original release
- Network: Oprah Winfrey Network
- Release: September 6, 2016 – November 29, 2022

Queen Sugar is an American drama television series created and executive produced by Ava DuVernay, with Oprah Winfrey serving as an executive producer. DuVernay also directed the first two episodes. The series is based on the 2014 novel of the same name by American writer Natalie Baszile. Queen Sugar centers on the lives of three siblings in rural Louisiana (Rutina Wesley, Dawn-Lyen Gardner, and Kofi Siriboe) who must deal with the aftermath of their father's sudden death and decide the fate of his 800-acre sugarcane farm. The main themes in the series often accompany episodes centered on racial profiling, the long reach of chattel slavery in American history and the inequities in the criminal justice system, and other issues related to African Americans.

The show holds a 93% approval rating on review aggregator Rotten Tomatoes and has won two NAACP Image Awards and 12 total nominations. Critics have praised the racially progressive show for storylines that tackle universal issues such as culture, class, and gender, while highlighting elements that address specific concerns of African-American society as expressed by the show's predominantly black cast.

Queen Sugar airs on Oprah Winfrey Network (OWN) and premiered on September 6, 2016. In January 2021, ahead of the fifth season premiere, the series was renewed for a sixth season, which premiered on September 7, 2021. Ahead of the sixth season finale, it was announced that the series was renewed for a 13-episode seventh and final season, which premiered on September 6, 2022.

== Plot ==
The series follows the lives of three siblings in rural Louisiana: Nova Bordelon (Rutina Wesley), a formidable journalist and activist from New Orleans; Charley Bordelon (Dawn-Lyen Gardner), a working wife and mother in Los Angeles; and their brother, Ralph Angel Bordelon (Kofi Siriboe), a single parent struggling with unemployment and raising his son alone. Their father has recently died and unexpectedly bequeathed an 800-acre sugarcane farm in equal proportion to each of his three children in Louisiana. Recently divorced, Charley, whose husband is caught up in a scandalous affair, takes her teenage son Micah and moves to the heart of rural Louisiana to operate the farm.

== Cast and characters ==
=== Main cast ===
- Rutina Wesley as Nova Bordelon, the eldest Bordelon child. She is a journalist, activist and healer in New Orleans.
- Dawn-Lyen Gardner as Charlotte "Charley" Bordelon West, the second Bordelon child. She was conceived when their father Ernest moved west and married a white woman. She is the biracial half sibling to Nova and Ralph Angel, sports manager, mother of Micah and ex-wife of Davis West (seasons 1–6).
- Kofi Siriboe as Ralph Angel Bordelon, the youngest Bordelon sibling. He is looking to better himself after recently being released from prison. Tied strongly to his family land.
- Nicholas L. Ashe as Micah West, Charley's and Davis' teenage son.
- Omar Dorsey as Hollingsworth "Hollywood" Desonier, a much younger oil rig worker, husband to Violet, and friend of the Bordelon family.
- Dondre Whitfield as Remy Newell, an irrigation specialist who was a friend and confidante to Ernest. He soon tries to help Ernest's grown children and soon becomes Charley's love interest (seasons 1–3; guest seasons 4 and 7).
- Timon Kyle Durrett as Davis West, a charismatic star basketball player, ex-husband of Charley, and father of Micah. His involvement in a sex scandal resulted in the end of their marriage, though they eventually reconcile and remarry (seasons 1–2; recurring seasons 3–6).
- Greg Vaughan as Calvin Gaston, a married police officer and Nova Bordelon's longtime secret lover (season 1; guest season 2; recurring season 4–5, and 7)
- Ethan Hutchison as Blue Bordelon, Ralph Angel's and Darla's nine-year-old son. (seasons 1–5; guest season 6; recurring season 7)
- Marycarmen Lopez as Reyna Velez, Blue's elementary school teacher and Ralph Angel’s love interest (season 1)
- Tina Lifford as Violet Bordelon, the younger sister of Ernest Bordelon. She acts as the matriarch of the family and lives with her husband, Hollywood.
- Bianca Lawson as Darla Bordelon (née Sutton), Ralph Angel's wife and Blue and Tru's mother, seeking to reconnect with them both as she is in recovery from a drug addiction. (seasons 2–7; recurring season 1)
- Henry G. Sanders as Prosper Denton, a lifelong friend to Ernest and fellow farmer (seasons 3–7; recurring seasons 1–2).
- Walter Perez as Romero Rodriguez, a doctor and love interest to Charley (season 4; recurring season 3)
- Tammy Townsend as Billie, Prosper's estranged daughter (seasons 6–7)

=== Recurring ===
- Glynn Turman as Ernest Bordelon, the late patriarch of the Bordelon family and older brother of Violet (season 1)
- True O'Brien as Stella, Micah's girlfriend in Los Angeles (season 1)
- Reagan Gomez-Preston as Chantal Williams, Nova's friend and love interest
- Issac White as Devonte "Too Sweet" Bonclair, a teen who after being falsely imprisoned becomes the main focus of Nova's current crusade on how the parish DA has been railroading African-Americans (season 1; guest, season 3)
- Tanyell Waivers as Keke Raymond, a teenage friend of the family who becomes Micah's girlfriend and then a good friend (seasons 1–5, 7).
- Deja Dee as Sierra, Nova's college roommate
- Sharon Lawrence as Lorna Prescott, Charley's mother
- Michael Michele as Darlene, Darla's mother
- Roger Guenveur Smith as Quincy, Darla's father
- Alimi Ballard as Dr. Robert Dubois, an activist who is briefly Nova's love interest in the second season
- Lea Coco as Jacob Boudreaux, a member of the Landry family who takes a special interest in Charley
- Danielle Lyn as Lizy, Nova's fellow journalist and friend (season 2–3)
- David Jensen as Samuel Landry, the owner of the most popular mill, the Landry mills, in the parish, who Charley and Ralph-Angel go up against
- Brian Michael Smith as Toine Wilkins, Ralph Angel's childhood friend. He is transgender and influences Ralph's acceptance of his son Blue's differences (guest seasons 2–4, 7)
- Nikko Austen Smith as Asha Green, the old soul. One of Micha's activist high school friends. A brilliant, passionate teenager wanting to make a difference (seasons 3–4)
- Vivien Ngô as Trinh Phan, a young woman who returns to help her parents with their seafood plant who becomes Ralph Angel's love interest (season 3)
- Tony Aidan Vo as Khanh Phan, the younger brother to Trinh and son of Mrs. Phan (season 3)
- Elyse Dinh McCrillis as Mrs. Phan, a Vietnamese American refugee and the mother to Khanh and Trinh; also Ralph Angel's boss at the seafood plant (season 3)
- Erica Tazel as Deesha Brown-Sonnier, a public defender and Ralph Angel's love interest (season 4)
- Paula Jai Parker as Celine (season 6)
- Marquis Rodriguez as Isaiah (season 6)
- McKinley Freeman as Dominic (season 6)
- Lamman Rucker as Vince (season 7), Billie's estranged husband

=== Guest roles ===
- David Alan Grier as Jimmy Dale, Violet's abusive ex-husband (season 4)
- Cree Summer as Octavia Laurent (season 4)
- Bryan Terrell Clark as Darla's love interest who is also in recovery (season 4)
- Amirah Vann as Parker Campbell, corporate lobbyist and bi-racial daughter of Sam Landry (seasons 4-7).
- LaTonya Holmes as Realtor in "Pleasure Is Black" (season 4 episode 1, 2019).

== Episodes ==
=== Series overview ===
Season	Episodes	Originally released	
Season	Episodes	First released	Last released
1	13	September 6, 2016	November 30, 2016
2	16	June 20, 2017	November 15, 2017
3	13	May 29, 2018	August 22, 2018
4	13	June 12, 2019	September 11, 2019
Special		February 9, 2021	
5	10	February 16, 2021	April 20, 2021
6	10	September 7, 2021	November 16, 2021
7	13	September 6, 2022	November 29, 2022

=== Season 1 (2016) ===
No. overall	No. in season	Title	Directed by	Written by	Original release date	U.S. viewers (millions)
1	1	"First Things First"	Ava DuVernay	Ava DuVernay	September 6, 2016	2.69
In St Josephine Parish, Louisiana, Ernest Bordelon, patriarch of the Bordelon family, owns a large sugar cane farm. He is one of the few black farmers that owns his own land. He has 3 adult children Nova the oldest a newspaper reporter in New Orleans, that provides marijuana for local dealers and medicinally to the elderly She is also involved in an affair with a married white police officer. Charlotte (Charley) lives in Los Angeles and is married to a famous basketball player, Davis West, and has a teenage son Micah. Ralph Angel the youngest, has a toddler son of his own, Blue. Ralph Angel has recently been released from prison and is currently on parole. Ralph Angel drops off Blue with his aunt Violet and her partner, Hollywood. In LA, Charley is having lunch with other basketball wives when news breaks of a sex scandal involving most members of the team but not Davis. At school, Blue is upset his classmates will not attend his birthday. Upon hearing this, his teacher told the class she will be attending the party. At Blue’s birthday party, Ernest has a stroke and has to be hospitalized. During Davis’s game, a video is released showing him being involved in the sex scandal, and Charley confronts him on the court mid-game. At the hospital Blue’s mother, a recovering addict, shows up asking for visitation as she has started to turn her life around. The family has not been able to contact Charley and tell her of her father’s condition, when they finally do she arrives too late as he has already passed away.
2	2	"Evergreen"	Ava DuVernay	Tina Mabry	September 7, 2016	2.14
3	3	"Thy Will Be Done"	Neema Barnette	Jason Wilborn	September 14, 2016	2.00
4	4	"The Darker Sooner"	So Yong Kim	Kay Oyegun	September 21, 2016	1.52
5	5	"By Any Chance"	Victoria Mahoney	Anthony Sparks	September 28, 2016	1.59
6	6	"As Promised"	Tanya Hamilton	Melissa Carter	October 5, 2016	1.44
7	7	"In No Uncertain Terms"	Neema Barnette	Denise Harkavy	October 12, 2016	1.68
8	8	"Where With All"	Kat Candler	Tina Mabry	October 26, 2016	1.71
9	9	"Next to Nothing"	Kat Candler	Jason Wilborn	November 2, 2016	1.69
10	10	"So Far"	Salli Richardson-Whitfield	Anthony Sparks	November 9, 2016	1.50
11	11	"All Good"	Salli Richardson-Whitfield	Kay Oyegun	November 16, 2016	1.64
12	12	"Far Too Long"	Tina Mabry	Melissa Carter & Ali Gordon-Goldstein	November 23, 2016	1.50
13	13	"Give Us This Day"	Tina Mabry	Ava DuVernay	November 30, 2016	1.91

=== Season 2 (2017) ===
No. overall	No. in season	Title	Directed by	Written by	Original release date	U.S. viewers (millions)
14	1	"After the Winter"	Kat Candler	Monica Macer	June 20, 2017	2.31
15	2	"To Usward"	Cheryl Dunye	Jason Wilborn	June 21, 2017	1.69
16	3	"What Do I Care for Morning"	Aurora Guerrero	Anthony Sparks	June 28, 2017	1.55
17	4	"My Soul's High Song"	Maryam Keshavarz	Dana Greenblatt	July 5, 2017	1.46
18	5	"Caroling Dusk"	Amanda Marsalis	Davita Scarlett	July 12, 2017	1.52
19	6	"Line of Our Elders"	DeMane Davis	Mimi Won Techentin	July 19, 2017	1.56
20	7	"I Know My Soul"	Kat Candler	Maria Elena Rodriguez	July 26, 2017	1.57
21	8	"Freedom's Plow"	Amanda Marsalis	Anthony Sparks	August 2, 2017	1.59
22	9	"Yet Do I Marvel"	Julie Dash	Jason Wilborn	October 3, 2017	1.74
23	10	"Drums at Dusk"	Julie Dash	Valerie Chu	October 4, 2017	1.20
24	11	"Fruit of the Flower"	Cheryl Dunye	Dana Greenblatt	October 11, 2017	1.31
25	12	"Live in the All Along"	Garrett Bradley	Mimi Won Techentin	October 18, 2017	1.14
26	13	"Heritage"	Liesl Tommy	Monica Macer & Davita Scarlett	October 25, 2017	1.34
27	14	"On These I Stand"	Christina Voros	Jason Wilborn & Anthony Sparks	November 1, 2017	1.28
28	15	"Copper Sun"	DeMane Davis	Monica Macer & Dana Greenblatt	November 8, 2017	1.22
29	16	"Dream Variations"	Kat Candler	Ava DuVernay	November 15, 2017	1.33
Note: This episode is 90 minutes.

=== Season 3 (2018) ===
No. overall	No. in season	Title	Directed by	Written by	Original release date	U.S. viewers (millions)
30	1	"A Rock, a River, a Tree"	DeMane Davis	Kat Candler	May 29, 2018	1.48
31	2	"Of Their Sojourn Here"	Patricia Cardoso	Anthony Sparks	May 30, 2018	1.04
32	3	"Your Distant Destiny"	Lauren Wolkstein	Erika L. Johnson	June 6, 2018	0.92
33	4	"No Haven in My Shadow"	Maria Govan	Mike Flynn	June 13, 2018	1.13
34	5	"A Little Lower Than Angels"	Shaz Bennett	Chloé Hung	June 20, 2018	1.14
35	6	"Delicate and Strangely Made"	Christina Choe	Channing Godfrey Peoples	June 27, 2018	1.17
36	7	"Study War No More"	DeMane Davis	Anthony Sparks	July 11, 2018	1.20
37	8	"Come, Clad in Peace"	DeMane Davis	Erika L. Johnson	July 18, 2018	1.01
38	9	"The Tree and Stone Were One"	Nijla Mumin	Anthony Sparks	July 25, 2018	1.05
39	10	"Here Beside the River"	Ayoka Chenzira	Chloé Hung	August 1, 2018	1.02
40	11	"Your Passages Have Been Paid"	Rachel Raimist	Channing Godfrey Peoples	August 8, 2018	1.05
41	12	"The Horizon Leans Forward"	Kat Candler	Mike Flynn	August 15, 2018	1.05
42	13	"From on the Pulse of Morning"	Kat Candler	Anthony Sparks	August 22, 2018	1.01
Note: This episode is 90 minutes.

=== Season 4 (2019) ===
No. overall	No. in season	Title	Directed by	Written by	Original release date	U.S. viewers (millions)
43	1	"Pleasure Is Black"	Cheryl Dunye	Anthony Sparks	June 12, 2019	1.02
44	2	"I No Longer Imagine"	Carmen Marrón	Chloé Hung	June 19, 2019	0.97
45	3	"Where My Body Stops or Begins"	Lacey Duke	Mike Flynn	June 26, 2019	1.08
46	4	"Skin Transparent"	Numa Perrier	Valerie Woods	July 3, 2019	1.03
47	5	"Face Speckled"	Heidi Saman	Lisa Morales	July 10, 2019	1.18
48	6	"By the Spit"	Bola Ogun	Felicia Pride	July 24, 2019	0.95
49	7	"Of Several Centuries"	Tchaiko Omawale	Anthony Sparks	July 31, 2019	0.95
50	8	"All the Borders"	Deborah Kampmeier	Chloé Hung & Valerie Woods	August 7, 2019	1.07
51	9	"Stare at the Same Fires"	C. Fitz	Lisa Morales	August 14, 2019	1.15
52	10	"Oh Mamere"	Cheryl Dunye	Chloé Hung & Felicia Pride	August 21, 2019	1.02
53	11	"I'm Sorry"	Stacey Muhammad	Mike Flynn & Valerie Woods	August 28, 2019	1.02
54	12	"Here"	Pratibha Parmar	Anthony Sparks & Alison McKenzie	September 4, 2019	1.05
55	13	"I Am"	Ayoka Chenzira	Anthony Sparks	September 11, 2019	1.10

=== Special (2021) ===
No. overall	No. in season	Title	Directed by	Written by	Original release date	U.S. viewers (millions)
56	-	"Never Let Go"	Unknown	Unknown	February 9, 2021	0.32

=== Season 5 (2021) ===
No. overall	No. in season	Title	Directed by	Written by	Original release date	U.S. viewers (millions)
57	1	"Late-February 2020"	Lauren Wolkstein	Anthony Sparks	February 16, 2021	0.75
58	2	"Mid-March 2020"	Lisa France	Lisa Morales	February 23, 2021	0.64
59	3	"Late-April 2020"	Lauren Wolkstein	Norman Vance, Jr.	March 2, 2021	0.68
60	4	"Early-May 2020"	Cierra Glaude	Ava DuVernay & Anthony Sparks	March 9, 2021	0.62
61	5	"May 19, 2020"	Lauren Wolkstein	Norman Vance, Jr. & Ava DuVernay	March 16, 2021	0.56
62	6	"May 27, 2020"	Cierra Glaude	Anthony Sparks	March 23, 2021	0.63
63	7	"June 1, 2020"	Lisa France	Norman Vance Jr. & Ava DuVernay	March 30, 2021	0.60
64	8	"June 3, 2020"	Cierra Glaude	Anthony Sparks & Autumn Joy Jimerson	April 6, 2021	0.59
65	9	"In Summer Time to Simply Be"	Lauren Wolkstein	Ava DuVernay & Anthony Sparks	April 13, 2021	0.69
66	10	"Onward"	Lauren Wolkstein	Ava DuVernay & Anthony Sparks	April 20, 2021	0.66

=== Season 6 (2021) ===
No. overall	No. in season	Title	Directed by	Written by	Original release date	U.S. viewers (millions)
67	1	"If You Could Enter Their Dreaming"	Carmen Marron	Anthony Sparks	September 7, 2021	0.66
68	2	"And Dream with Them Deeply"	Cierra Glaude	Alison McKenzie	September 14, 2021	0.56
69	3	"You Would Come Back Different"	Marie Jamora	Shaz Bennett	September 21, 2021	0.58
70	4	"To a Different Day"	Stephanie Turner	Sara Finney-Johnson	September 28, 2021	0.56
71	5	"Moving So Easily Through That Common Depth"	Shari L. Carpenter	Wayne Conley	October 5, 2021	0.63
72	6	"Or Maybe Just Stay There"	Bertha Bay-Sa Pan	Michelle Denise Jackson	October 12, 2021	0.66
73	7	"They Would Bloom and Welcome You"	Keisha Rae Witherspoon	Alison McKenzie & Alex G. Berger	October 26, 2021	0.70
74	8	"All Those Brothers and Sisters"	Lisa France	Sara Finney-Johnson & Yves Beneche	November 2, 2021	0.68
75	9	"Tossing in the Meadows"	Shaz Bennett	Wayne Conley & Autumn Joy Jimerson & Ava DuVernay	November 9, 2021	0.69
76	10	"And You Would Be One of Them"	Shaz Bennett	Anthony Sparks	November 16, 2021	0.65

=== Season 7 (2022) ===
No. overall	No. in season	Title	Directed by	Written by	Original release date	U.S. viewers (millions)
77	1	"And When Great Souls Die"	Kat Candler	Shaz Bennett	September 6, 2022	0.44
78	2	"After a Period, Peace Blooms"	Kat Candler	Sara Finney-Johnson	September 13, 2022	0.43
79	3	"Slowly and Always Irregularly"	Stacey Muhammad	Francesca Butler	September 20, 2022	0.43
80	4	"Spaces Fill"	Stacey Muhammad	Charles Ray Hamilton	September 27, 2022	0.51
81	5	"With a Kind Of"	Shaz Bennett	Eddie Serrano	October 4, 2022	0.41
82	6	"Soothing Electric Vibration"	Shaz Bennett	Karen Corneille	October 11, 2022	0.50
83	7	"Our Senses Restored"	Patricia Cardoso	Alan Morgan and Ava DuVernay	October 18, 2022	0.45
84	8	"Never to Be the Same"	Patricia Cardoso	Josslyn Luckett and Ava DuVernay	October 25, 2022	0.47
85	9	"Whisper to Us"	Aurora Guerrero	Sara Finney-Johnson & Charles Ray Hamilton	November 1, 2022	0.49
86	10	"They Existed"	Aurora Guerrero	Francesca Butler & Josslyn Luckett and Shaz Bennett	November 8, 2022	0.49
87	11	"We Can Be"	DeMane Davis	Karen Corneille & Ava DuVernay	November 15, 2022	0.48
88	12	"Be and Be Better"	DeMane Davis	Eddie Serrano & Alan Morgan	November 22, 2022	0.37
89	13	"For They Existed"	Ava DuVernay	Ava DuVernay	November 29, 2022	0.51

== Production ==
=== Development ===
On February 2, 2015, it was announced that Oprah Winfrey Network had ordered a straight-to-series TV drama based on Queen Sugar, the 2014 novel by Natalie Baszile. Ava DuVernay and Oprah Winfrey, who worked on the 2014 film Selma, co-created the series, with DuVernay was set to write and direct the initial episodes.

The first season began filming in February 2016 and contained 13 episodes. DuVernay announced on January 27, 2016, that the series would feature an all-women directorial team. On February 15, 2016, Melissa Carter served as showrunner alongside Ava DuVernay. Neema Barnette joined the series as director and producer. Award-winning director Tina Mabry is a producer and will also direct two episodes, and Anthony Sparks, an award-winning TV writer and professor, began as a co-executive producer for the series in its first season and is the show’s longtime head writer, Executive Producer, and Showrunner. It was later announced that singer-songwriter Meshell Ndegeocello would provide the score for the series. Queen Sugar is said to be the first television series in which female directors direct every episode of the series.

=== Casting ===
On January 13, 2016, Rutina Wesley was announced to play the role of Nova Bordelon. Further casting was announced January 27, 2016. Dawn-Lyen Gardner, Kofi Siriboe, and Omar Dorsey, who co-starred in Selma, were all announced in leading roles. On February 1, 2016, it was announced that Emmy Award-winner Glynn Turman will guest-star as Ernest Bordelon, the patriarch of the family who dies in the first episode. On February 16, 2016, it was announced that Tina Lifford, Dondre Whitfield, Timon Kyle Durrett and Nicholas L. Ashe were cast as series regulars. On February 23, 2016, Bianca Lawson and Greg Vaughan joined the cast as regulars, while Henry G. Sanders joined in a recurring role. Oprah Winfrey Network said that Winfrey, who earlier was announced as a recurring character, would not have an onscreen role. On March 11, 2016, it was announced that Marycarmen Lopez also was cast as regular. On April 6, 2021, Tammy Townsend joined the cast as a new series regular while Paula Jai Parker, Marquis Rodriguez, and McKinley Freeman joined cast in recurring roles for the sixth season.

After her absence from the season seven trailer started to get noticed on social media, Dawn-Lyen Gardner explained that she didn't participate on the final season of the show, so the few moments in which the audience sees or listens to the character were done by mixing archive footage from previous seasons.

=== Release ===
On August 1, 2016, the series was renewed for a second season ahead of the series' television premiere, which aired in a two-night premiere on June 20 and 21, 2017. The second season premiered on OWN in a two episode special on June 20 and 21, 2017.

The show was renewed for a third season on July 26, 2017. The third season premiered in a two-night special on May 29 and 30, 2018.

On August 8, 2018, the series was renewed for a fourth season. Following the renewal, co-executive producer Anthony Sparks was revealed to be the new showrunner, replacing Kat Candler. The fourth season premiered on June 12, 2019.

On September 12, 2019, OWN renewed the series for a fifth season which premiered on February 16, 2021. On January 14, 2021, ahead of the fifth season premiere, OWN renewed the series for a sixth season, which premiered on September 7, 2021. In November 2021, shortly before the sixth season finale, the series was renewed for a seventh and final season. The seventh season premiered on September 6, 2022.

== Reception ==
Critical response of Queen Sugar (season 1)
Season	Rotten Tomatoes	Metacritic
1	93% (41 reviews)	75 (25 reviews)
2	100% (10 reviews)	—N/a
3	100% (7 reviews)	—N/a

The review aggregator website Rotten Tomatoes reported a 93% approval rating for the first season, with an average rating of 7.4/10 based on 41 reviews. The website's critical consensus reads, "With an authenticity of culture and place and strong performances throughout, Queen Sugar rises above melodrama in this alluring, unhurried and powerful portrait of a fractious black American family." Metacritic, which uses a weighted average, assigned a score of 75 out of 100 based on 25 critics for the season, indicating what the website considers to be "generally favorable reviews". A 100% approval rating for the second season was reported by Rotten Tomatoes, with an average rating of 8.03/10 based on 7 reviews.

== Accolades ==
Year	Association	Category	Recipient(s)	Result	Ref.
2016	AAFCA TV Awards	Best Drama	Queen Sugar	Won	
2016	AAFCA TV Awards	Best TV Shows	Queen Sugar	Won	
2017	AAFCA TV Awards	Best Drama	Queen Sugar	Won	
2017	AAFCA TV Awards	Best TV Shows	Queen Sugar	Won	
2017	Black Reel Awards	Outstanding Drama Series	Queen Sugar	Nominated	
2017	Black Reel Awards	Outstanding Actor, Drama Series	Kofi Siriboe	Nominated	
2017	Black Reel Awards	Outstanding Actress, Drama Series	Rutina Wesley	Won	
2017	Black Reel Awards	Outstanding Actress, Drama Series	Dawn-Lyen Gardner	Nominated	
2017	Black Reel Awards	Outstanding Directing, Drama Series	Ava DuVernay (for "First Things First")	Nominated	
2017	Black Reel Awards	Outstanding Writing, Drama Series	Ava DuVernay (for "First Things First")	Nominated	
2017	Hollywood Music in Media Awards	Original Score – TV Show/Limited Series	Meshell Ndegeocello	Nominated	
2017	NAACP Image Awards	Outstanding Drama Series	Queen Sugar	Won	
2017	NAACP Image Awards	Outstanding Actor in a Drama Series	Kofi Siriboe	Nominated	
2017	NAACP Image Awards	Outstanding Actress in a Drama Series	Rutina Wesley	Nominated	
2017	NAACP Image Awards	Outstanding Writing in a Dramatic Series	Ava DuVernay (for "First Things First")	Won	
2017	NAACP Image Awards	Outstanding Writing in a Dramatic Series	Anthony Sparks (for "By Any Chance")	Nominated	
2017	People's Choice Awards	Favorite Cable TV Drama	Queen Sugar	Nominated	
2018	AAFCA TV Awards	Best Drama	Queen Sugar	Won	
2018	Black Reel Awards	Outstanding Drama Series	Queen Sugar	Nominated	
2018	Black Reel Awards	Outstanding Actor, Drama Series	Kofi Siriboe	Nominated	
2018	Black Reel Awards	Outstanding Actress, Drama Series	Rutina Wesley	Won	
2018	Black Reel Awards	Outstanding Actress, Drama Series	Dawn-Lyen Gardner	Nominated	
2018	Black Reel Awards	Outstanding Supporting Actor, Drama Series	Omar J. Dorsey	Won	
2018	Black Reel Awards	Outstanding Supporting Actor, Drama Series	Dondré T. Whitfield	Nominated	
2018	Black Reel Awards	Outstanding Supporting Actress, Drama Series	Bianca Lawson	Nominated	
2018	Black Reel Awards	Outstanding Guest Actor, Drama Series	Alimi Ballard	Nominated	
2018	Black Reel Awards	Outstanding Guest Actor, Drama Series	Roger Guenveur Smith	Nominated	
2018	Black Reel Awards	Outstanding Guest Actress, Drama Series	Michael Michele	Nominated	
2018	Black Reel Awards	Outstanding Directing, Drama Series	Cheryl Dunye (for "Fruit of the Flower")	Nominated	
2018	Black Reel Awards	Outstanding Writing, Drama Series	Monica Macer, Davita Scarlett (for "Heritage")	Nominated	
2018	Black Reel Awards	Outstanding Writing, Drama Series	Ava DuVernay (for "Dream Variations")	Nominated	
2018	Black Reel Awards	Outstanding Music	Liza Richardson	Nominated	
2018	NAACP Image Awards	Outstanding Drama Series	Queen Sugar	Nominated	
2018	NAACP Image Awards	Outstanding Actor in a Drama Series	Kofi Siriboe	Nominated	
2018	NAACP Image Awards	Outstanding Actor in a Drama Series	Rutina Wesley	Nominated	
2018	NAACP Image Awards	Outstanding Supporting Actor in a Drama Series	Dondre Whitfield	Nominated	
2018	NAACP Image Awards	Outstanding Supporting Actress in a Drama Series	Tina Lifford	Nominated	
2018	NAACP Image Awards	Outstanding Performance by a Youth	Ethan Hutchison	Nominated	
2018	NAACP Image Awards	Outstanding Writing in a Dramatic Series	Ava DuVernay (for "Dream Variations")	Nominated	
2018	NAACP Image Awards	Outstanding Writing in a Dramatic Series	Anthony Sparks (for "What Do I Care For Morning)"	Nominated	
2019	Black Reel Awards	Outstanding Actor, Drama Series	Kofi Siriboe	Nominated	
2019	Black Reel Awards	Outstanding Actress, Drama Series	Rutina Wesley	Won	
2019	Black Reel Awards	Outstanding Actress, Drama Series	Dawn-Lyen Gardner	Nominated	
2019	Black Reel Awards	Outstanding Supporting Actor, Drama Series	Nicholas L. Ashe	Nominated	
2019	Black Reel Awards	Outstanding Supporting Actress, Drama Series	Tina Lifford	Nominated	
2019	Black Reel Awards	Outstanding Directing, Drama Series	DeMane Davis (for "A Rock, A River, A Tree")	Nominated	
2019	NAACP Image Awards	Outstanding Drama Series	Queen Sugar	Nominated	
2019	NAACP Image Awards	Outstanding Actor in a Drama Series	Kofi Siriboe	Nominated	
2019	NAACP Image Awards	Outstanding Actress in a Drama Series	Rutina Wesley	Nominated	
2020	Black Reel Awards	Outstanding Actor, Drama Series	Kofi Siriboe	Nominated	
2020	Black Reel Awards	Outstanding Actress, Drama Series	Rutina Wesley	Nominated	
2020	Black Reel Awards	Outstanding Guest Actor, Drama Series	David Alan Grier	Nominated	
2020	Black Reel Awards	Outstanding Guest Actress, Drama Series	Cree Summer	Nominated	
2020	Black Reel Awards	Outstanding Directing, Drama Series	Ayoka Chenzira (for "I Am")	Nominated	
2020	Black Reel Awards	Outstanding Writing, Drama Series	Mike Flynn (for "Where My Body Stops or Begins")	Nominated	
2020	NAACP Image Awards	Outstanding Drama Series	Queen Sugar	Nominated	
2020	NAACP Image Awards	Outstanding Actor in a Drama Series	Kofi Siriboe	Nominated	
2020	NAACP Image Awards	Outstanding Actress in a Drama Series	Rutina Wesley	Nominated	
2020	NAACP Image Awards	Outstanding Supporting Actress in a Drama Series	Tina Lifford	Nominated	
2020	NAACP Image Awards	Outstanding Guest Actor or Actress in a Television Series	David Alan Grier	Nominated	
2021	AAFCA TV Awards	Best Drama	Queen Sugar	Won	
2021	AAFCA TV Awards	Impact Award	Queen Sugar	Won	
2021	AAFCA TV Awards	Best Writing	Anthony Sparks	Won	
2021	Black Reel Awards	Outstanding Drama Series	Queen Sugar	Nominated	
2021	Black Reel Awards	Outstanding Actress, Drama Series	Dawn-Lyen Gardner	Nominated	
2022	NAACP Image Awards	Outstanding Drama Series	Queen Sugar	Won	
2022	NAACP Image Awards	Outstanding Actor in a Drama Series	Kofi Siriboe	Nominated	
2022	NAACP Image Awards	Outstanding Actress in a Drama Series	Dawn-Lyen Gardner	Nominated	
2022	NAACP Image Awards	Outstanding Actress in a Drama Series	Rutina Wesley	Nominated	
2022	NAACP Image Awards	Outstanding Supporting Actress in a Drama Series	Bianca Lawson	Nominated	
2023	NAACP Image Awards	Outstanding Drama Series	Queen Sugar	Nominated	
2023	NAACP Image Awards	Outstanding Actor in a Drama Series	Kofi Siriboe	Nominated	
2023	NAACP Image Awards	Outstanding Actress in a Drama Series	Rutina Wesley	Nominated	
2023	NAACP Image Awards	Outstanding Supporting Actress in a Drama Series	Bianca Lawson	Nominated	
2023	NAACP Image Awards	Outstanding Supporting Actress in a Drama Series	Tina Lifford	Nominated	
2023	NAACP Image Awards	Outstanding Guest Actor or Actress in a Television Series	Glynn Turman	Won	

== Novel ==
UCLA graduate Natalie Baszile started writing Queen Sugar, the novel, in the early 1990s, but the text was only completed ten years later. She first presented the manuscript to publishers in 2009 but without any success. After revising the book for another two years, she resubmitted the text, with one agent agreeing to represent her.

Baszile took part in a women writer's retreat in Hedgebrook. A friend of hers who was also at the retreat, the novelist Sarah Manyika, suggested that she read part of Queen Sugar to fellow residents. Leigh Haber, O, The Oprah Magazine's book editor was attending and loved the novel and passed it to people at Oprah's Harpo Productions. A few months after that, Harpo called to say they wanted to option the book for a project.

The book was published by Penguin in 2014 as Baszile's debut novel and, a few months later, OWN negotiated the deal to turn the book into a television series.
