= NAACP Image Award for Outstanding Drama Series =

American media award

This article lists the winners and nominees for the NAACP Image Award for Outstanding Drama Series. Originally entitled Outstanding Drama Series, Mini-Series or Television Movie, the award was first given in 1991, before being retitled to its current name in 1995. Grey's Anatomy currently holds the record for most wins in this category with five.

== Winners and nominees ==
Winners are listed first and highlighted in bold.

=== 1990s ===
Year	Series	Ref
1991
1991	**The Women of Brewster Place**	
1992
1992	**In the Heat of the Night**	
1993
1993	**In the Heat of the Night**	
1994
1994	**I'll Fly Away**	
1994	In the Heat of the Night	
1994	L.A. Law	
1994	Law & Order	
1994	TriBeCa	
1995
1995	**I'll Fly Away**	
1996
1996	**New York Undercover**	
1996	Chicago Hope	
1996	ER	
1996	Homicide: Life on the Street	
1996	Under One Roof	
1997
1997	**New York Undercover**	
1997	ER	
1997	Homicide: Life on the Street	
1997	NYPD Blue	
1997	Touched by an Angel	
1998
1998	**Touched by an Angel**	
1998	413 Hope St.	
1998	Chicago Hope	
1998	ER	
1998	New York Undercover	
1999
1999	**Touched by an Angel**	
1999	Ally McBeal	
1999	ER	
1999	Homicide: Life on the Street	
1999	Law & Order	

=== 2000s ===
Year	Series	Ref
2000
2000	**Touched by an Angel**	
2000	Ally McBeal	
2000	ER	
2000	Oz	
2000	The Practice	
2001
2001	**City of Angels**	
2001	Any Day Now	
2001	Gideon's Crossing	
2001	The Practice	
2001	Soul Food	
2002
2002	**Soul Food**	
2002	Any Day Now	
2002	Boston Public	
2002	ER	
2002	The Practice	
2003
2003	**Soul Food**	
2003	24	
2003	Boston Public	
2003	Six Feet Under	
2003	The Wire	
2004
2004	**Soul Food**	
2004	24	
2004	Boston Public	
2004	CSI: Miami	
2004	The Wire	
2005
2005	**Law & Order**	
2005	ER	
2005	Kevin Hill	
2005	Soul Food	
2005	The Wire	
2006
2006	**Grey's Anatomy**	
2006	Commander in Chief	
2006	CSI: Miami	
2006	House	
2006	Lost	
2007
2007	**Grey's Anatomy**	
2007	24	
2007	Heroes	
2007	The Unit	
2007	The Wire	
2008
2008	**Grey's Anatomy**	
2008	House	
2008	K-Ville	
2008	Lincoln Heights	
2008	The Unit	
2009
2009	**Grey's Anatomy**	
2009	House	
2009	Lincoln Heights	
2009	The Unit	
2009	The Wire	

=== 2010s ===
Year	Series	Ref
2010
2010	**Lincoln Heights**	
2010	Cold Case	
2010	Grey's Anatomy	
2010	Hawthorne	
2010	The No. 1 Ladies' Detective Agency	
2011
2011	**Grey's Anatomy**	
2011	Hawthorne	
2011	Detroit 1-8-7	
2011	Treme	
2011	Law & Order: Special Victims Unit	
2012
2012	**Law & Order: Special Victims Unit**	
2012	Boardwalk Empire	
2012	Grey's Anatomy	
2012	The Good Wife	
2012	Treme	
2013
2013	**Scandal**	
2013	Boardwalk Empire	
2013	Grey's Anatomy	
2013	Treme	
2013	True Blood	
2014
2014	**Scandal**	
2014	Boardwalk Empire	
2014	Grey's Anatomy	
2014	The Good Wife	
2014	Treme	
2015
2015	**How to Get Away with Murder**	
2015	Being Mary Jane	
2015	Grey's Anatomy	
2015	House of Cards	
2015	Scandal	
2016
2016	**Empire**	
2016	Being Mary Jane	
2016	How to Get Away with Murder	
2016	Power	
2016	Scandal	
2017
2017	**Queen Sugar**	
2017	Empire	
2017	Power	
2017	This Is Us	
2017	Underground	
2018
2018	**Power**	
2018	Greenleaf	
2018	Queen Sugar	
2018	This Is Us	
2018	Underground	
2019
2019	**Power**	
2019	The Chi	
2019	How to Get Away with Murder	
2019	Queen Sugar	
2019	This Is Us	

=== 2020s ===
Year	Series	Network	Ref
2020
2020	**Greenleaf**	OWN	
2020	Godfather of Harlem	Epix	
2020	Queen Sugar	OWN	
2020	The Chi	Showtime	
2020	Watchmen	HBO	
2021
2021	**Power Book II: Ghost**	Starz	
2021	All Rise	CBS	
2021	Bridgerton	Netflix	
2021	Lovecraft Country	HBO	
2021	This Is Us	NBC	
2022
2022	**P-Valley**	Starz	
2022	Bel-Air	Peacock	
2022	Bridgerton	Netflix	
2022	Euphoria	HBO	
2022	Queen Sugar	OWN	
2023
2023	**Queen Sugar**	OWN	
2023	9-1-1	FOX	
2023	All American	The CW	
2023	Godfather of Harlem	MGM+	
2023	Pose	FX	
2024
2024	**Queen Charlotte: A Bridgerton Story**	Netflix	
2024	Bel-Air	Peacock	
2024	Black Cake	Hulu	
2024	Found	NBC	
2024	Snowfall	FX	
2025
2025	**Cross**	Amazon Prime Video	
2025	9-1-1	ABC	
2025	Bel-Air	Peacock	
2025	Found	NBC	
2025	Reasonable Doubt	Hulu	
2026
2026	**Reasonable Doubt**	Hulu	
2026	Bel-Air	Peacock	
2026	Beyond the Gates	CBS	
2026	Forever	Netflix	
2026	Paradise	Hulu	

== Multiple wins and nominations ==
=== Wins ===
5 wins

- Grey's Anatomy

3 wins

- Soul Food
- Touched by an Angel

2 wins

- I'll Fly Away
- In the Heat of the Night
- New York Undercover
- Queen Sugar
- Scandal
- Power

=== Nominations ===
10 nominations

- Grey's Anatomy

7 nominations

- ER

5 nominations

- Queen Sugar
- Soul Food
- The Wire

4 nominations

- Bel-Air
- This Is Us
- Touched by an Angel
- Treme

3 nominations

- 24
- Boardwalk Empire
- Boston Public
- Homicide: Life on the Street
- House
- Lincoln Heights
- New York Undercover
- The Practice
- Scandal
- The Unit

2 nominations

- 9-1-1
- The Chi
- Found
- Greenleaf
- Godfather of Harlem
- Power
- Reasonable Doubt
- Underground
