= Dawn-Lyen Gardner =

American actress

- Born: Los Angeles, California, U.S
- Occupation: Actress
- Years active: 1994–present

Dawn-Lyen Gardner is an American actress. She is best known for her role as Charley Bordelon West in the Oprah Winfrey Network drama series Queen Sugar.

== Early life ==
Gardner was born in Los Angeles, California. She is of mixed heritage, with an African-American father and a Chinese mother.

After graduating from Los Angeles County High School for the Arts in 1999, Gardner later moved to New York City and attended Juilliard School with actress Rutina Wesley, with whom she would later work with in the TV show Queen Sugar.

== Career ==
Gardner began acting on television at an early age, appearing in a recurring role on Viper and guest starring on ER. While attending Juilliard, she began acting on stage, appearing in such productions like For Colored Girls, The School of Night, and The Seagull. She also appeared in a number of regional productions. She had a number of guest-starring roles on television shows including Crossing Jordan, Bones, Heroes, and Castle. Gardner also worked as a voice actress, playing Steela Gerrera in the Star Wars: The Clone Wars.

In 2016, Gardner was cast as a lead character alongside Rutina Wesley in the Oprah Winfrey Network drama series Queen Sugar, created and produced by Ava DuVernay and Oprah Winfrey. Gardner left the series after six seasons and made a cameo appearance in the final season in 2022. For her performance, Gardner received four Black Reel Awards nominations and an NAACP Image Award for Outstanding Actress in a Drama Series nomination.

== Filmography ==
Year	Title	Role	Notes
1993	The Sinbad Show	Donna	Episode: "Breaking the Pattern"
1994	Viper	Ronnie Wilkes	Recurring role, 4 episodes
1994	ER	Sandy Rochon	Episode: "Into That Good Night"
2004	Invisible Scream	Andi	Short film
2004	Married to the Kellys	Shannon	Episode: "The Other Sister"
2004	Crossing Jordan	Leever	Episode: "After Dark"
2005	Summerland	Tess	Episode: "Where There's a Will There's a Wave"
2006	Art School Confidential	Coed	
2007	Bones	Court Reporter	Episode: "The Man in the Mansion"
2007	Cane	Melissa	Episode: "The Exile"
2009–2010	Heroes	Elizabeth	Episodes: "Chapter Nine 'Brother's Keeper'" and "Chapter Thirteen 'Let It Bleed'"
2011	Castle	Simone Jenkins	Episode: "Cops & Robbers"
2012	Prototype 2	Collette Heller (voice)	Video game
2012	Star Wars: The Clone Wars	Steela Gerrera (voice)	4 episodes
2015	The Mysteries of Laura	Samantha Williams	Episode: "The Mystery of the Watery Grave"
2016	Unforgettable	Erica Campbell	Episode: "Breathing Space"
2016–2021, 2022	Queen Sugar	Charley Bordelon West	Series regular, 78 episodes Nominated — Black Reel Award for Outstanding Actress, Drama Series (2017–2019, 2021); Nomination — NAACP Image Award for Outstanding Actress in a Drama Series (2022)
2016	Luke Cage	Megan McLaren	Recurring role, 4 episodes
2017	The Dunning Man	Alice	
2018	Conan Exiles	Jamila the Pirate Queen	
2018	God Friended Me	Katie	Episodes: "Pilot" and "The Good Samaritan"
2025	Star Wars: Tales of the Underworld	Arin (voice)	Episode: "A Good Turn"
