= Queen Sugar (novel) =

2014 American novel by Natalie Baszile

- Cover of book Queen Sugar by Natalie Baszile
- Author: Natalie Baszile
- Language: English
- Genre: Fiction
- Publisher: Pamela Dorman Books
- Publication date: February 6, 2014
- Publication place: United States
- Media type: Print (paperback)
- Pages: 384 pp (first edition)
- ISBN: 0670026131 (first edition)
- Preceded by: None

Queen Sugar is the debut novel of American writer Natalie Baszile, published by Penguin in 2014. Set in contemporary Louisiana, it tells the story of Charley Bordelon, a young African-American widow from Los Angeles who moves to a rural town to manage a sugarcane farm she had unexpectedly inherited there from her father.

== Plot ==
Charley Bordelon is a young mother in Los Angeles, recently widowed after her husband was killed for fighting back during a robbery hold-up. After the death of her father, she learns that rather than inheriting his local rental properties, she has inherited a sugarcane farm in St. Josephine, Louisiana, where he was born and raised. Against her mother's wishes, Charley moves to St. Josephine, taking her 15-year-old daughter, Micah, with her and moving in with her paternal grandmother, Miss Honey. Shortly after arriving, Charley learns that her property manager has been neglecting the farm and is about to quit to work an oil rig. She is hard pressed to find another property manager so late in the season but Prosper Denton, a retired farmer recommended by Miss Honey, reluctantly agrees to come out of retirement to help her.

Charley's estranged older half-brother, Ralph Angel, a former drug addict and the child of their father's relationship with his high school sweetheart in St. Josephine, returns to town with his son, Blue. Angel is deeply embittered that his father left him nothing, and he also resents Charley for having been raised by a man who essentially abandoned him.

Charley struggles to keep the farm going, quickly realizing that it takes more money than was earmarked for maintenance. She believes that wealthy white farmers in the area, such as Jacques Landry and Samuel T. Baron, are conspiring against her and ready to take over the land if she fails. She learns from Miss Honey that her father once worked as a cane cutter on the farm she now owns. In the days of segregation and Jim Crow, he was beaten by an overseer for drinking from a water pail first instead of giving way to the white workers. She renews her determination to keep the farm running, as a way of continuing her father's struggle. She and Denton hire a retired white farmer, Alison Delcambre, to help manage the farm. They recover from a hurricane that flattens the crops.

Charley refuses to hire Angel. He finds low-paying menial labor in the rural community and slides back to drug abuse.

Charley meets a white farmer, Remy Newell, a divorcé who seems attracted to her. Their courtship is short lived after Remy makes insensitive racial comments. But after some encouragement from her aunt Violet, Charley decides to give Remy another chance. He asks his goddaughter, elected as Queen Sugar for the annual festival, to invite Charley's daughter, Micah, to be an honorary member of her court and ride on the parade float with her, and the young girl is thrilled.

Miss Honey forces Charley to give Angel a job. He is resentful of the menial assignment and later tells Charley she should be ashamed of dating a white man. Charley fires him. To get revenge Angel steals the money Miss Honey keeps in her house and a statue Charley's father had given her, The Cane Cutter. She had planned to sell it at auction to raise money to complete the cane harvest.

On Micah's birthday, Charley discovers that The Cane Cutter is gone, and believes that she faces financial ruin. The rest of the family immediately thinks that Angel stole the statue but Miss Honey denies it; nonetheless, she refuses to let anyone call the police. A few days later Angel returns and confesses that he stole the piece. During an altercation with his cousin John, a correctional officer, Angel shoots and wounds him. He is soon caught by police who, seeing his gun, fatally shoot him.

Charley is devastated by the loss of the artwork and the death of her brother. Preparing to meet with Landry and Baron to accept their offer for her farm, she happens to tell Hollywood, a former friend of Angel, her predicament. He offers to give her the $50,000 she needs to complete harvesting. He has saved a small fortune through mowing lawns for $5 an hour.

Charley completes the harvest and prepares for the following season. She and Remy continue their relationship, and she starts the process of adopting her nephew Blue. She learns that Angel never sold The Cane Cutter, and kept it in his trunk. After the statue is returned to Charley, she promises it to Blue when he grows up.

== Reception ==
Queen Sugar received mostly positive reviews. Critics praised its characters, conflict, use of its setting, and prose style, while some criticized its pacing. The novel was named one of the San Francisco Chronicle's best books of 2014.

== Adaptation ==
In 2014, the Oprah television network OWN negotiated a deal for the rights to adapt the book as a television series. It was created, directed, and executive produced by Ava DuVernay. Oprah Winfrey served as an executive producer.

The series airs on Oprah Winfrey Network and premiered on September 6, 2016. It has spanned six seasons with a seventh and final one premiering in 2022.

== Biography ==
Baszile attended local schools. She initially studied finance and economics in college, as her father wanted her to go into his family business. She felt she most came alive in her English classes. She started working with her father in his business after college, but also continued her writing.

Baszile eventually changed fields and graduated from UCLA with an M.A. in Afro-American Studies and a MFA in Writing from Warren Wilson College. She started writing what became Queen Sugar inn the 1990s, exploring an African-American-themed tale of endurance and hope in the American South. She worked on the text for ten years. She sent her manuscript to publishers in 2009 but without any success. After revising the book for two years, she resubmitted the text, and one agent agreed to represent her.

Baszile attended a women writer's retreat in Hedgebrook. Her friend and novelist Sarah Manyika, who also attended, suggested that Baszile read part of a chapter from Queen Sugar to the group. Attendee Leigh Haber, book editor for O, The Oprah Magazine, loved the novel and passed it to people at Harpo for their review. A few months after that, Harpo called Baszile to say they wanted to option the book for a project.
