= Rutina Wesley =

American actress

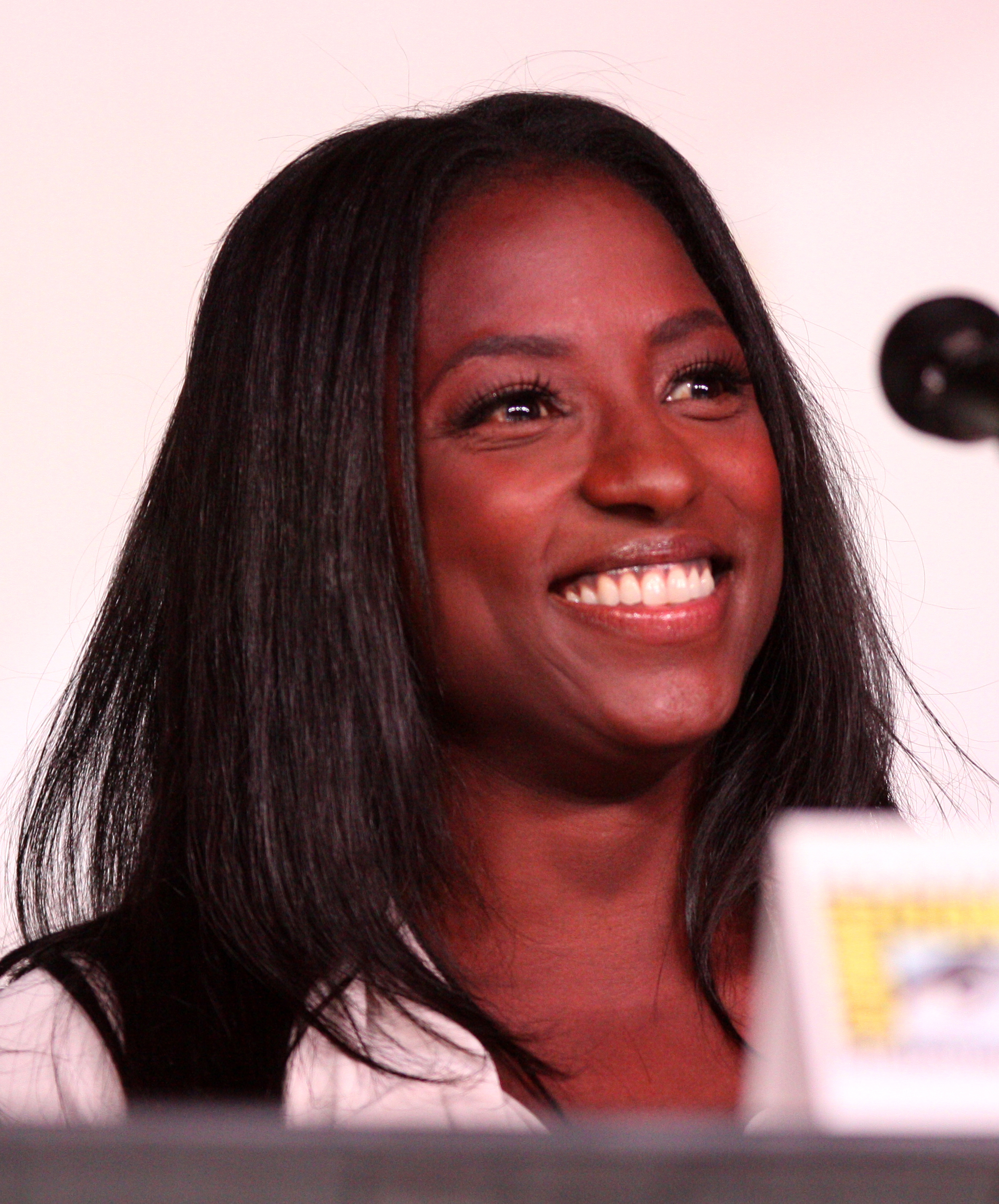
- Rutina Wesley at the 2012 San Diego Comic-Con
- Born: December 21, 1978 (age 47); Las Vegas, Nevada, U.S.
- Education: University of Evansville (BFA); Juilliard School (GrDip)
- Occupation: Actress
- Years active: 2005–present
- Spouse: Jacob Fishel (m. 2005; sep. 2013)

Rutina Wesley (born December 21, 1978) is an American actress. She is best known for her roles as Tara Thornton in the HBO fantasy drama series True Blood, Nova Bordelon on the OWN drama series Queen Sugar, and Maria Miller in the HBO post-apocalyptic drama series The Last of Us.

== Early life and education ==
Wesley was born and raised in Las Vegas, Nevada. Her father, Ivery Wheeler, is a professional tap dancer, and her mother, Cassandra Wesley, was a showgirl. She attended high school at the Las Vegas Academy of International Studies, Performing and Visual Arts. She studied dance at Simba Studios and the West Las Vegas Arts Center.

While at the Las Vegas Academy, Wesley missed some auditions for college training programs. She finally decided to attend the University of Evansville in Indiana.

After Wesley earned her Bachelor of Fine Arts in Theatre Performance in 2001, her grandmother suggested that she do a nursing course to have a practical fallback job, but Wesley insisted on pursuing her artistic education. She enrolled at the Juilliard School in 2001 and graduated in May 2005 (Group 34). Her studies included a summer spent at the Royal Academy of Dramatic Art in London.

She was presented with an honorary Doctor of Arts degree by Dean College in 2023 for her work as an actress and contribution to pop culture.

== Career ==
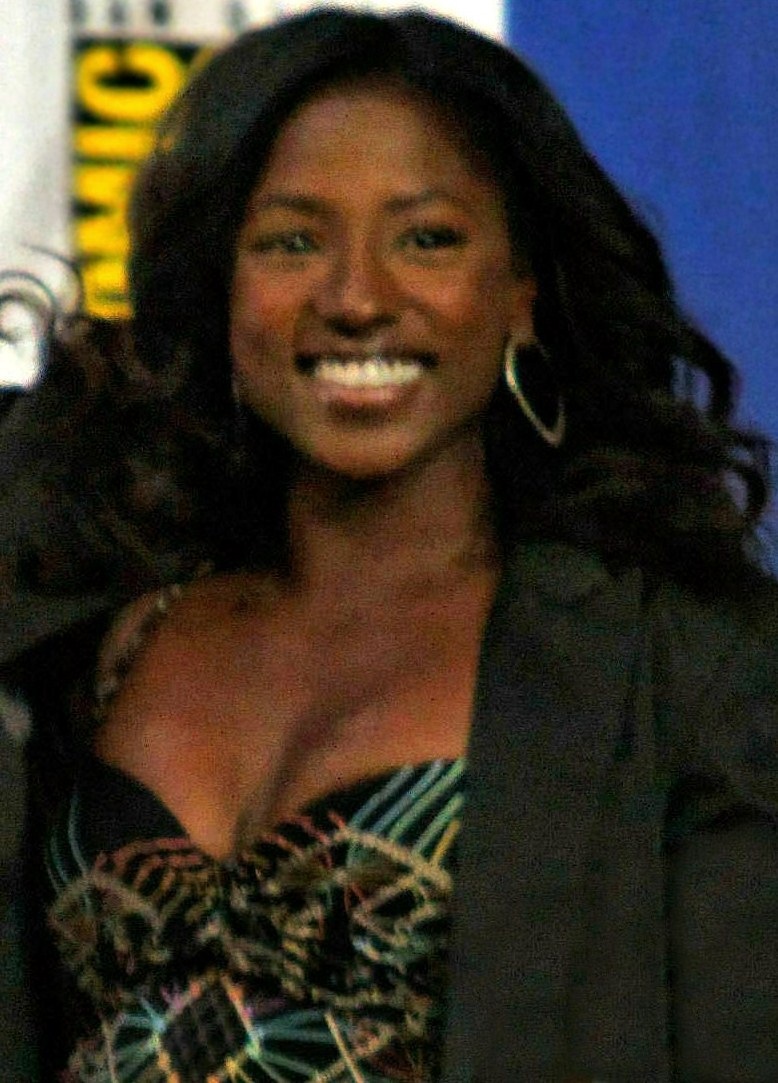
Rutina Wesley appearing on a panel for True Blood at San Diego Comic-Con in July 2009.

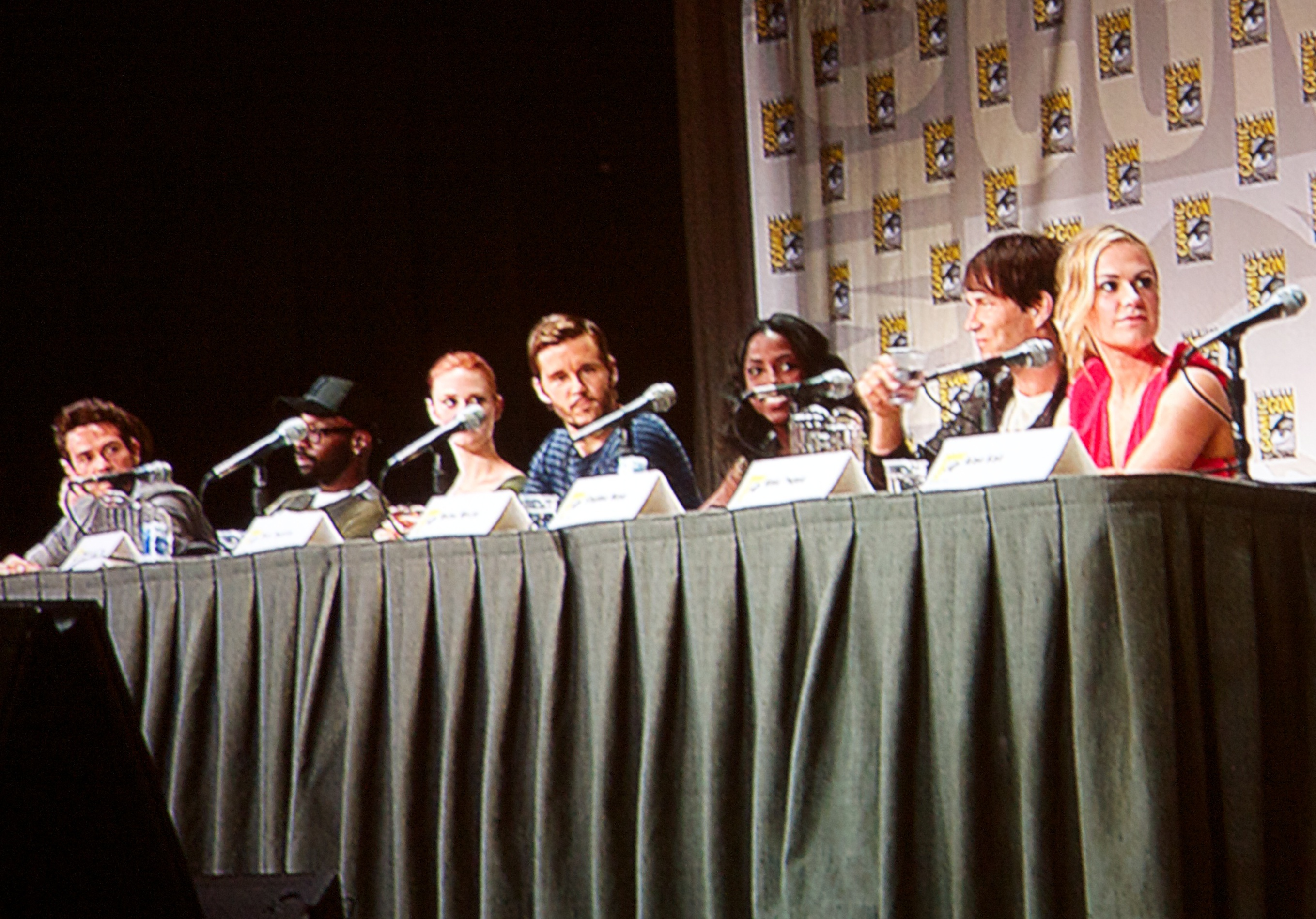
Rutina Wesley at San Diego Comic-Con with Ryan Kwanten, Deborah Ann Woll, Anna Paquin, Stephen Moyer, and Nelsan Ellis from the TV series True Blood in 2011.

In December 2006, Wesley was featured in David Hare's Broadway play The Vertical Hour. In 2007, Wesley also appeared in The Public Theater production of In Darfur by playwright Winter Miller, co-starring Heather Raffo and Aaron Lohr, among others.

Wesley had a minor role in the 2005 film Hitch, which was edited out in the final cut. In 2007, she made her on-screen debut as the main character in the film How She Move, from British director Ian Iqbal Rashid. The character Raya Green, who enters a step-dancing competition to secure funds for her education, was inspired by Tony Manero, portrayed by John Travolta in Saturday Night Fever. Prior to the shooting of the film, Wesley underwent a five-week dance rehearsal period. Portraying a woman of Jamaican descent, she also took dialect coaching for the role.

Wesley auditioned for the role Tara Thornton in the HBO series True Blood in 2007 and secured the part after creator Alan Ball chose her because "[she] was the first person who showed [Tara's] vulnerable side".

In January 2015, it was announced that Wesley had been cast in a recurring role on the NBC drama series Hannibal. She portrayed Reba McClane, "a blind woman who enters into a relationship with Francis Dolarhyde (Richard Armitage), and helps soothe his murderous urges—at least at first." Wesley appeared as Liza Warner in the fourth season of Arrow.

In 2016, Wesley was cast as the lead character Nova Bordelon in the Oprah Winfrey Network drama series Queen Sugar, produced by Ava DuVernay and Oprah Winfrey.

In 2023, Wesley portrayed Maria Miller in the HBO series The Last of Us.

== Personal life ==
Wesley divides her time between Astoria, Queens, and Los Angeles, California. In 2005, she married her former Juilliard classmate Jacob Fishel, an actor. After separating in July, Wesley filed for divorce on August 16, 2013, citing irreconcilable differences.

In November 2017, Wesley announced her partnership to Shonda, a chef from New Orleans. They later broke up in 2019.

== Filmography ==
=== Film ===
| Year | Movies | Roles | Notes |
|---|---|---|---|
| 2007 | How She Move | Raya Green | |
| 2012 | California Winter | Marcy Sanchez | |
| 2013 | The Championship Rounds | Tina | Short |
| 2014 | 13 Sins | Shelby | |
| 2014 | Last Weekend | Nora Finley-Perkins | |
| 2015 | The Perfect Guy | Alicia | |
| 2015 | Broad Squad | Joanne | TV movie |
| 2017 | Last Looks | Sister | Short |
| 2019 | Live and Let Die | Solitaire (voice) | Video |
| 2019 | Stucco | Officer | Short |
| 2021 | Outsiders | Ramila | |

=== Television ===
| Year | TV show | Role | Notes |
|---|---|---|---|
| 2008 | Numb3rs | Sarah/Jenny Calandro | Episode: "Magic Show" |
| 2008–14 | True Blood | Tara Thornton | Main Cast |
| 2009–12 | The Cleveland Show | Yvette (voice) | Guest Cast: Season 1 & 3 |
| 2010 | True Blood: Webisodes | Tara Thornton | Episode: "Sookie, Tara & Lafayette" |
| 2010–11 | Generator Rex | Providence Cadet Kenwyn Jones (voice) | Guest Cast: Season 1–2 |
| 2011 | Bandwagon: The Series | Auditioner | Episode: "It's Your One Shot" |
| 2012 | True Blood: Jessica's Blog | Tara Thornton | Episode: "Big Vampire Sisters" |
| 2015 | Hannibal | Reba McClane | Recurring Cast: Season 3 |
| 2015–17 | Arrow | Liza Warner/Lady Cop | Guest Cast: Season 4–5 |
| 2016–22 | Queen Sugar | Nova Bordelon | Main Cast |
| 2019 | The Walking Dead | Jocelyn | Episode: "Scars" |
| 2022 | DMZ | Athena | Episode: "Home" |
| 2023–25 | The Last of Us | Maria Miller | Guest: Season 1, Recurring Cast: Season 2 |
| 2024 | Monster High | Venus McFlytrap (voice) | Recurring Cast: Season 2 |

== Awards and nominations ==
| Year | Award | Category | Nominated work | Result |
|---|---|---|---|---|
| 2009 | 5th Scream Awards | Best Supporting Actress | True Blood | Nominated |
| 2009 | 14th Satellite Awards | Best Cast – Television Series | True Blood | Won |
| 2010 | 16th Screen Actors Guild Awards | Outstanding Performance by an Ensemble in a Drama Series | True Blood | Nominated |
| 2013 | 44th NAACP Image Awards | Outstanding Supporting Actress in a Drama Series | True Blood | Nominated |
| 2017 | 48th NAACP Image Awards | Outstanding Actress in a Drama Series | Queen Sugar | Nominated |
| 2017 | 17th Black Reel Awards | Outstanding Actress in a Drama Series | Queen Sugar | Won |
| 2018 | 49th NAACP Image Awards | Outstanding Actress in a Drama Series | Queen Sugar | Nominated |
| 2018 | 18th Black Reel Awards | Outstanding Actress in a Drama Series | Queen Sugar | Won |
| 2019 | 50th NAACP Image Awards | Outstanding Actress in a Drama Series | Queen Sugar | Nominated |
| 2019 | 19th Black Reel Awards | Outstanding Actress in a Drama Series | Queen Sugar | Won |
| 2020 | 51st NAACP Image Awards | Outstanding Actress in a Drama Series | Queen Sugar | Nominated |
| 2020 | 20th Black Reel Awards | Outstanding Actress in a Drama Series | Queen Sugar | Nominated |
| 2022 | 53rd NAACP Image Awards | Outstanding Actress in a Drama Series | Queen Sugar | Nominated |

== See also ==
- LGBT culture in New York City
- List of LGBT people from New York City
- NYC Pride March
