= Muhammad Ali in media and popular culture =

Overview of the American boxer in media and popular culture

This article covers the boxer Muhammad Ali's appearances in media and popular culture.

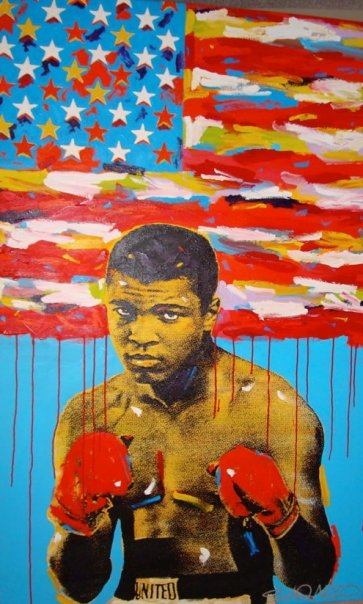
Pop art painting of Muhammad Ali by John Stango

== Literature ==
=== Books ===
- The Cassius Clay Story, by George Sulivan (1964)
- Black is Best: The Riddle of MUHAMMAD ALI, by Jack Olsen (1967)
- Muhammad Ali, who once was Cassius Clay, by John Cottrell (1968)
- Sting Like a Bee: The Muhammad Ali Story, by José Torres (1971)
- Loser and Still Champion: Muhammad Ali, by Budd Schulberg (1972)
- The Fight, by Norman Mailer (1975)
- The Greatest: My Own Story, by Muhammad Ali, with Richard Durham (1975)
- Free to Be Muhammad Ali, by Robert Lipsyte (1979)
- "The Muhammad Ali Cookbook" with Lana Shabazz (1980)
- Muhammad Ali, the People's Champ, by Elliott J. Gorn (1988)
- Muhammad Ali: Heavyweight Champion (Black Americans of Achievement), by Jack Rummel (1989)
- Muhammad Ali: The Fight for Respect, by Thomas Conklin (1992)
- Clay V. United States: Muhammad Ali Objects to War (Landmark Supreme Court Cases), by Suzanne Freedman (1997)
- The Tao of Muhammad Ali, by Davis Miller (1997)
- I'm A Little Special: A Muhammad Ali Reader, by Gerald Early (1998)
- King of the World, by David Remnick (1999)
- More Than a Champion: The Style of Muhammad Ali, by Jan Philipp Reemtsma (1999)
- Learning About Strength of Character from the Life of Muhammad Ali (Character Building Book), by Michele Ingber Drohan (1999)
- Muhammad Ali (Journey to Freedom), by Clay Latimer (2000)
- Redemption Song: Muhammad Ali and the Spirit of the Sixties, by Mike Marqusee (2000)
- The Greatest, by Walter Dean Myers (2001)
- Muhammad Ali: Through the Eyes of the World, by Mark Collings (2001)
- Ghosts of Manila, by Mark Kram (2002)
- Lucky Man: A Memoir, by Michael J. Fox (2002)
- Muhammad Ali: Trickster Celebrity in the Culture of Irony, by Charles Lemert (2003)
- The Soul of a Butterfly: Reflections on Life's Journey, by Muhammad Ali and Hana Ali (2004)
- The Untold Legacy Of Muhammad Ali, by Thomas Hauser (2005)
- Clay V. United States And How Muhammad Ali Fought the Draft: Debating Supreme Court Decisions, by Thomas Streissguth (2006)
- What's My Name, Fool? Sports and Resistance in the United States, by Dave Zirin (2005)
- The psychodynamics of white racism: An historical exploration of white racial pathology as elicited by prizefighters Jack Johnson and Muhammad Ali : (Dissertation), by Michal Louise Beale (2006)
- I'm a Bad Man: African American Vernacular Culture and the Making of Muhammad Ali, by Shawn Williams (2007)
- The Greatest: My Own Story, by Muhammad Ali with Richard Durham, edited by Toni Morrison (2015)
- Blood Brothers: The Fatal Friendship Between Muhammad Ali and Malcolm X, by Randy Roberts and Johnny Smith (2016)
- Ali: A life, by Jonathan Eig (2017)

=== Magazine articles ===
- Playboy – Interview: Cassius Clay, by Hugh M. Hefner (October 1964)
- Life Magazine – Cover: Cassius Clay (Muhammad Ali), by Editor Henry Luce (March 6, 1964)
- Esquire – "The Passion of Muhammad Ali", by George Lois (April 1968)
- Life Magazine – Cover: Muhammad Ali, by Editor Henry Luce (October 23, 1970)
- Life Magazine – Cover: Muhammad Ali and Joe Frazier, by Editor Henry Luce (March 5, 1971)
- Life Magazine – Cover: Ali vs Frazier by Frank Sinatra, by Editor Henry Luce (March 19, 1971)
- Time Magazine – "The Greatest is Gone Muhammad Ali * Much Ado About Haldeman", (February 27, 1978)
- ESPN Sports Century – "Muhammad Ali: "The Greatest" by Joyce Carol Oates (1999)
- Time Magazine – "100 Heroes & Icons: Muhammad Ali", by George Plimpton (June 14, 1999)
- "UN Messengers of Peace reflect on their work. (Muhammad Ali, Jane Goodall, and Anna Cataldi)" An article from UN Chronicle (2005)
- "The fight of his life: boxing Great Muhammad Ali battles Parkinson's disease" An article from: Science World, by Mona Chiang (2006)

=== Poetry and quotations ===
- Muhammad Ali, In Fighter's Heaven, by Victor Bockris (2000)
- I Am The Greatest Quotes Muhammad Ali, by Karl Evanzz (2002)
- Perfect in Their Art: Poems on Boxing from Homer to Ali, by Bud Schulberg, Robert Hedin, and Michael George Waters (2003)
- The Soul of a Butterfly: Reflections on Life's Journey, by Muhammad Ali with Hana Yasmeen Ali (2004)

=== Illustrated books ===
- Ali Rap: Muhammad Ali the First Heavyweight Champion of Rap, by George Lois (2006)
- The Rough Guide to Muhammad Ali, by Ann Oliver (2004)

=== Comics ===
- Superman vs. Muhammad Ali, by Dennis O'Neil and Neal Adams, (DC Comics, 1978)
- Asterix and the Big Fight – The protagonist, a Gallo-Roman chieftain, is named Cassius Ceramix in the English version of the comic. Chief Vitalstatistix's strategy of wearing down his opponent and his victory dance are based on Ali's.
- The fifth Clayface's name is a parody of Ali's, named Cassius "Clay" Payne.

=== Books for children ===
- More Than a Hero: Muhammad Ali's Life Lessons Presented Through His Daughter's Eyes, by Hana Ali (2000)
- Float Like a Butterfly, by Ntozake Shange (author), Edel Rodriguez (illustrator) (2002)
- I Shook Up the World: The Incredible Life of Muhammad Ali, by Maryum "May May" Ali (2004)
- Muhammad Ali: Legends in Sports, by Matt Christopher and Glenn Stout (2005)
- I'll Hold Your Hand So You Won't Fall: A Child's Guide To Parkinson's Disease, by Rasheda Ali (2005)

== Music ==
=== Featuring Ali himself ===
- In 1976, Ali released the album Ali and His Gang vs. Mr. Tooth Decay, which told a story meant to educate children about dental hygiene The album was narrated by Howard Cosell, with guest appearances by Frank Sinatra and Richie Havens. A sequel Ali and His Gang vs. Fat Cat the Dope King was planned, but apparently never released.
- Ali himself released a 45 rpm version of the song "Stand by Me" (written by Ben E. King, Jerry Leiber and Mike Stoller), a track which also featured on his 1963 Columbia album I am the Greatest (released under the name Cassius Clay).
- In December 1969, Ali appeared on Broadway in the musical Buck White. The show ran for just seven performances; but Ali and the cast performed the number "We Came in Chains" on The Ed Sullivan Show.
- Ali influenced several elements of hip hop music, as a "rhyming trickster" in the 1960s with "funky delivery, the boasts, the comical trash talk, the endless quotables". According to Rolling Stone, his "freestyle skills" and his "rhymes, flow, and braggadocio" would "one day become typical of old school MCs" like Run–D.M.C. and LL Cool J, the latter citing Ali as an influence.

=== Songs ===
- In 1971, New York singer Vernon Harrell released a record about him called "Muhammed Ali" (sic) (Brunswick Records #55448) as Verne Harrell. This misspelling of Ali's name was printed on the labels of the 45s.
- In 1975, a song about Ali titled "Black Superman (Muhammad Ali)" was recorded by British reggae group Johnny Wakelin & the Kinshasa Band.
- In 1981, Dutch guitarist Harry Sacksioni composed and played a song called "Ali's Shuffle".
- The Freakwater song "Louisville Lip" on their 1998 album Springtime is a tribute to Muhammad Ali framed around the story Ali told in his 1975 autobiography about tossing his gold medal into the Ohio River after being refused service in a nearby diner.
- In his early 20s, singer-songwriter and piano impresario Ben Folds wrote the song "Boxing", a fictional monologue by Muhammad Ali to Howard Cosell pondering the end of his fighting career. The song was inspired by Folds' father's love of the sport. The song was eventually recorded and appeared on Ben Folds Five's eponymous album (1995). It has also appeared in a live version on the album Naked Baby Photos (1998), a solo version by Folds on iTunes Originals - Ben Folds (2005), and in a symphonic version with the West Australian Symphony Orchestra on the DVD Ben Folds and WASO Live in Perth (2005). The song has been covered by a number of artists, including Bette Midler on her album Bathhouse Betty (1998).
- The R. Kelly song "World's Greatest" is a tribute to Ali, and it is featured on the soundtrack to the 2001 motion picture Ali. In 2002, the song peaked at number 34 on Billboard's Hot 100 US singles chart and at number 4 on the UK singles chart. The song's video features archived footage of Ali as well as an homage to the firefighters, law enforcement officers and emergency medical workers regarded among the greatest heroes of the rescue operations necessitated by the events of 9/11.
- The British dance band Faithless recorded a song titled "Muhammad Ali" which was released as a single on September 23, 2001. The single reached number 29 on the UK singles chart. The song was included on their 2001 album Outrospective.
- In 2012, The Game released a song titled "Ali Bomaye". The song features 2 Chainz and Rick Ross.
- In 2013, internet comedic series Epic Rap Battles of History launched a rap video featuring Ali and Michael Jordan.
- In 2015, Australian band William Street Strikers used Ali's Attica Prison Poem lyrics on their song "No Surrender", from their album Nothing's Going On. The song was aired on the show Living in the Land of Oz after the death of Ali and became a staple of community radio after its release.
- In 2016, American soul group, KING, released a song titled "The Greatest", which was inspired by Muhammad Ali's unwavering confidence and grace. The song was included on the group's debut album "We Are King".
- In 2016, British rock band Coldplay used a sample of Ali's 1977 speech in Newcastle upon Tyne on the single version of their song "Everglow". The speech is also played whenever the band performs the song on their A Head Full of Dreams Tour.
- The Louisville Orchestra premiered a multimedia dramatic work about Ali by the orchestra's Music Director, Teddy Abrams, in November 2017 at the Kentucky Center for the Arts. The work presented Ali's own poems, speeches, and writings set as rap and spoken-word recitations, plus an original narration and numerous vocal settings of poems from many historical eras. Performers included Rhiannon Giddens, Jubilant Sykes, and Louisville rapper Jecorey "1200" Arthur, along with many other actors, speakers, and dancers from the Louisville community.
- The band Fever 333 references Ali in one of their songs, titled "Burn It."
- In 2026, K-pop artist Monsta X's Joohoney released a song "Sting", featuring Ali, which samples a 1974 audio clip of him and his memorable phrase "Float like a butterfly, sting like a bee."

=== Artists ===
- American singer Cautious Clay took his stage name from Ali's birth name.
- Japanese jazz band ALI is named after Ali.

== Visual arts ==
=== Film and television ===
==== Documentaries ====
- a.k.a. Cassius Clay is a 1970 documentary that covered Ali's triumphs and setbacks up to that moment in time.
- One Punch Too Many is a BBC TV documentary released in 1998.
- When We Were Kings is a 1996 Academy Award-winning documentary film about the "Rumble in the Jungle", Ali's 1974 fight against George Foreman in Kinshasa, Zaire (now the Democratic Republic of the Congo).
- ESPN produced specials in honor of Ali's 65th birthday. The shows include Ali Rap, Ali's Dozen and Ali 65. They premiered on December 9, 2006, at 9 pm EST on ESPN.
- Facing Ali is a 2009 documentary on the topic of all the fighters that Ali faced during his career. Each one is interviewed at length. The film made the shortlist for the 82nd Academy Awards in the category of Best Documentary Feature, but did not make the final list.
- Ali's fight with Larry Holmes was the subject of one of ESPN's 30 for 30 documentary series; "Muhammad and Larry" by Albert Maysles first aired on ESPN on October 27, 2009.
- Muhammad Ali: Made in Miami is a 2008 WLRN documentary that charts Cassius Clay's transformation from young boxing hopeful to a cultural icon. The film traces Ali's rapid rise through the heavyweight ranks, his friendship with Malcolm X, his historic clash with champion Sonny Liston, and his subsequent refusal to fight in Vietnam.
- The documentary When Ali Came to Ireland (2012) tells the story of Ali's first visit to Ireland to fight against Alvin Lewis in July 1972.
- The Trials of Muhammad Ali (2013)
- I Am Ali (2014)
- City of Ali is a 2021 documentary that details how Ali's death brought together the people of his hometown, Louisville, Kentucky.

==== Biographies ====
Numerous individuals have portrayed Ali in film biographies, including Ali himself in the 1977 film The Greatest. Others include:

- Future Amazing Race winner Chip McAllister, in the 1977 film The Greatest (portraying a young adult Cassius Clay)
- Darius McCrary, in the 1997 HBO TV movie Don King: Only in America
- Terrence Howard and Jamie "Showtime" Stafford, in the 2000 ABC TV movie King of the World
- David Ramsey and Aaron Meeks, in the 2000 Fox TV movie Ali: An American Hero
- Will Smith and Maestro Harrell, in the 2001 film Ali
- Jerrod Paige, in the 2007 film American Gangster
- Pooch Hall, in the 2016 film The Bleeder
- Deric Augustine, in Godfather of Harlem
- Eli Goree, in the 2020 film One Night in Miami... (based on the 2013 stage play, in which he was portrayed by Sope Dirisu)
- Sullivan Jones, in the 2023 film Big George Foreman: The Miraculous Story of the Once and Future Heavyweight Champion of the World
- Dexter Darden in the 2024 miniseries Fight Night: The Million Dollar Heist
- Jaalen Best, in the 2026 Amazon Prime Video miniseries The Greatest

==== Filmography ====
- Ali has appeared as himself in numerous scripted films and television series, including the films Requiem for a Heavyweight (1962), Body and Soul (1981), and Doin' Time (1985); and the television series Vega$ (1979), Diff'rent Strokes (1979), and Touched by an Angel (1999). He also provided the voice for the titular character in the 1977 NBC animated series I Am the Greatest: The Adventures of Muhammad Ali.
  - The Last Punch (2015)
- Ali portrayed a former slave in Reconstruction-era Virginia who is elected to the United States Senate in the 1979 NBC TV movie Freedom Road, which was based upon the 1944 novel by Howard Fast.
- Ali appeared on the WGBH series Say Brother, where he spoke about his reasons for not serving in the Vietnam War.
- In Young Justice, the high school cheer squad in Happy Harbor is named the Bumblebees and uses Ali's "Floats like a butterfly Stings like a bee" line as a cheer.
- The China, IL episode "Displays of Manhood" includes Ali as a character.

In addition, Ali influenced the character of Apollo Creed (Carl Weathers) in the Rocky franchise. At the 49th Academy Awards, where the original Rocky film won Best Picture, Ali, at the time in his second reign as the real-life world heavyweight champion, was a surprise presenter alongside Sylvester Stallone for Best Supporting Actress. Ali told Stallone, "I'm the real Apollo Creed!" They had a lighthearted confrontation onstage to show the film did not offend Ali before presenting the award, which Beatrice Straight won while only appearing in Network for five minutes and two seconds – the record for the shortest amount of screentime to win the award.

=== Television advertisements ===
In 1971, Ali appeared in a television commercial for Vitalis alongside fellow boxer Joe Frazier, and he appeared in a 1997 Super Bowl TV commercial for Pizza Hut with his real-life trainer Angelo Dundee.

In 1978, Ali appeared in a public service announcement for the New York City Department of Health exhorting parents to immunize their children. The PSA ended with the tagline "No shots, no school! It's the law!"

In 1980, Ali appeared in a television ad for d-CON Roach Proof: after hitting a heavy bag (a training device suspended from above that simulates the bulk of an opponent for punching), he turns to the camera in his boxing gear, raises and shakes a fist, and exclaims to the audience, "I don' want you livin' wit' roaches!"

Ali appeared in one of the posters for the "Think Different" campaign by Apple Computer in 1997.

=== Photography ===
- Muhammad Ali: The Birth of a Legend, Miami, 1961–1964, by Flip Schulke (1999).
- GOAT—Greatest of All Time. Published by Taschen (2004), the limited edition was autographed by Muhammad Ali and Jeff Koons.
- Muhammad Ali, by Dave Anderson and Magnum Photographers (2006).
- Greatest of All Time – A Tribute to Muhammad Ali (2010), published by Taschen.

=== Manga and anime ===
- New Grappler Baki — In Search of Our Strongest Hero, a Japanese manga and anime series, portrays Muhammad Ali and a fictional son, Muhammad Ali, Jr.

=== Video games ===
Ali has appeared in numerous video boxing games, some of which feature him as the title character. Examples include Foes of Ali, Muhammad Ali Heavyweight Boxing and the Knockout Kings series and its follow-up, the Fight Night series. Ali appears and is playable in WWE 2K24 as part of the celebration of 40 years of WrestleMania. Ali is also available as downloadable content in EA Sports's UFC 5.

=== Trading cards ===
Ali has many trading cards from sources around the globe but the 1965 Collezioni Lampo I Grandi Campioni Cassius Clay is widely considered his most valuable rookie card, regarded as the "grandaddy" of Muhammad Ali trading cards.

== Other ==
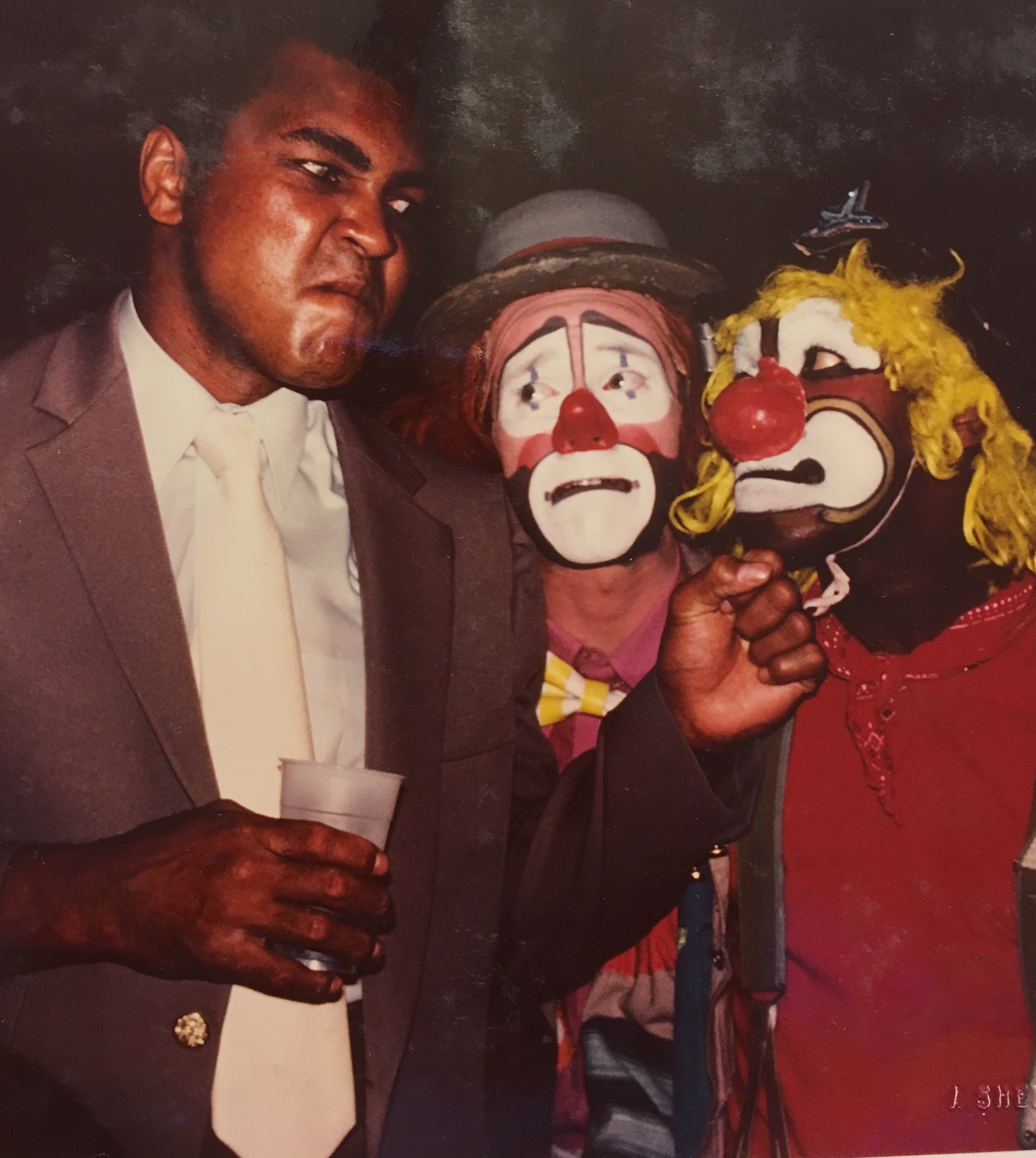
Ali with clowns Charlie Frye and Skeeter Reece in 1980

=== Dance ===
After Ali knocked-out German boxer Karl Mildenberger in 1966, there was a dance craze in Europe called "The Muhammad Ali Dance" which mimmicked Ali's footwork and punching stance to a swinging up-tempo beat. "The Muhammad Ali Dance" appeared in various teen dance television shows across Europe in 1966.

=== Institutions ===
Muhammad Ali Parkinson Center at the Barrow Neurological Institute in Phoenix, Arizona, is regarded as one of the largest and most comprehensive Parkinson’s treatment facilities in the country.

=== Martial arts ===
Martial artist and actor Bruce Lee was influenced by Ali, whose footwork he studied and incorporated into his own style while developing Jeet Kune Do in the 1960s. In turn, taekwondo fighter Jhoon Goo Rhee later taught Lee's AccuPunch, a non-telegraphed punch, to Ali while coaching him; Ali used the technique to knockout Richard Dunn in 1975.

Muhammad Ali vs. Antonio Inoki, a 1976 match in Tokyo between Ali and Japanese professional wrestler Antonio Inoki (now Muhammad Hussain Inoki) in 1976, was the first high-profile bout between a professional boxer and professional wrestler. The fight played an important role in the history of mixed martial arts (MMA). In Japan, the match inspired Inoki's students Masakatsu Funaki and Minoru Suzuki to found Pancrase in 1993, which in turn inspired the foundation of Pride Fighting Championships in 1997. Pride was acquired by its rival Ultimate Fighting Championship (UFC) in 2007.

=== Theater ===
- In Billy Elliot the Musical when Billy's boxing coach sets up a match between Billy and Michael, he points to each in turn saying, "You are Muhammad Ali and you are Cassius Clay".
- Will Power's Fetch Clay, Make Man is based on the friendship between actor Stepin Fetchit and Cassius Clay, later Muhammad Ali. The play explores how each handled life in the public eye as black men in their respective eras: Hollywood in the 20s, where a black actor's career depended on playing caricatures, and the mid-60s, after the assassination of Malcolm X.
- An officially authorized musical Ali, based on Ali's life is being directed and written by Clint Dyer, deputy artistic director of London's National Theatre, and scored by Louisville Orchestra's music director and conductor Teddy Abrams. Rapper and record producer Q-Tip has joined the production as music director and co-lyricist, along with Rich + Tone Talauega as choreographers. (Note: Attributed to multiple references:)

== Discography ==
- I Am the Greatest (1963)
- The Adventures of Ali and His Gang vs. Mr. Tooth Decay (1976)
