= The Greatest (2026 TV series) =

American biographical television series

- Genre: Biographical; Sports drama
- Created by: Ben Watkins
- Starring: Jaalen Best; Omari Hardwick; Dana Gourrier; Kai Parham; Giovanni Ribisi; Amin Joseph
- Composer: Stanley A. Smith
- Countries of origin: United States; Canada; Australia
- Original language: English
- No. of episodes: 8

Production
- Executive producers: Ben Watkins; Josh Wakely; Michael B. Jordan; Elizabeth Raposo; Lonnie Ali; Michele Anthony; Boyd Muir; Corey Salter; Marc Rosen; Matthew Gross; David Blackman; Shawn Carter; Craig Siebels; Aiyana White; Jeff Augustin; Katie Wech; Owen Shiflett
- Producer: Chris Agoston
- Cinematography: Stuart Campbell; Jeremy Benning
- Editors: Steven Lang; Roslyn Kalloo; James Kilton; Joel Varickanickal; Nicholas Wong
- Running time: 38–61 minutes
- Production companies: Amazon MGM Studios; Outlier Society; Unlimited Range productions; Authentic Studios; Roc Nation; Reunion Pacific Entertainment; PolyGram Entertainment; Grace: A Storytelling Company

Original release
- Network: Amazon Prime Video
- Release: November 4, 2026

The Greatest is a television biographical sports drama limited series about Muhammad Ali from Amazon MGM Studios for Amazon Prime Video. The series is created by Ben Watkins, and produced in collaboration with Ali's estate, with executive producers including his widow Lonnie Ali, as well as Josh Wakely and Michael B. Jordan. Jaalen Best stars as Ali. It premiered on November 4, 2026.

== Premise ==
The series delves into the personal and professional life of the legendary boxer Muhammad Ali.

== Cast ==
=== Main ===
- Jaalen Best as Cassius Clay, later Muhammad Ali
- Omari Hardwick as Ali's father, Cassius "Cash" Clay Sr.
- Dana Gourrier as Ali's mother, Odessa "Bird" Clay
- Kai Parham as Ali's brother, Rudy, later Rahaman Ali
- Giovanni Ribisi as Clay's boxing trainer, Angelo Dundee
- Amin Joseph as Sonny Liston

=== Recurring ===
- Michael Ealy as Malcolm X
- Erica Tazel as Sonny's wife, Geraldine Liston
- Reno Wilson as Drew Bundini Brown
- Aleks Paunovic as William Faversham Jr.
- Dave Davis as Marvin Geller
- Kelly AuCoin as Joe Martin
- Joel Keller as Chris Dundee

=== Guest ===
- Rico E. Anderson as Willie Reddish
- Chris Jericho as Gorgeous George
- Adrian Alvarado as Dr. Ferdie Pacheco
- Brandon McKnight as Floyd Patterson
- Jonathan Potts as William Reynolds
- Kaya Coleman as Honey
- Aimé Donna Kelly as Alberta Jones
- Chrystle Anjelee as Wilma Rudolph
- Brandon Victor Dixon as Captain Sam
- Mark Camacho as Cus D'Amato
- Nicoye Banks as Dick Sadler
- Dean Redman as Archie Moore
- Tom Ukah as Tobe Liston
- Mauro Castillo as Luis Sarria
- Hill Harper as Elijah Muhammad
- Jerod Haynes as Herbert Muhammad
- Tyrone Benskin as Pastor Whidden
- Cesili Williams as Betty Shabazz
- Tahmoh Penikett as Henry Cooper
- John Bourgeois as Bill MacDonald

== Episodes ==
No.	Title	Directed by	Written by	Original release date
1	"Fool's Gold"	Ben Watkins	Ben Watkins	November 4, 2026
2	"Promised Land"	Ben Watkins	Aiyana White	November 4, 2026
3	"The New Negro"	Stacey Muhammad	Jeff Augustin	November 4, 2026
4	"Artist at Work"	Stacey Muhammad	Blaize Ali-Watkins	November 4, 2026
5	"X²"	Emmanuel Osei-Kuffour Jr.	Ben Watkins & Maria Warith-Wade	November 4, 2026
6	"Eight Count"	Emmanuel Osei-Kuffour Jr.	Chris Erric Maddox	November 4, 2026
7	"Louder Than Words"	Craig Siebels	Aiyana White	November 4, 2026
8	"My Name Is..."	A.V. Rockwell	Ben Watkins & Jeff Augustin	November 4, 2026

== Production ==
=== Development ===
The series received a series order from Amazon Prime Video in July 2024 with the series produced in collaboration with Muhammad Ali's estate. The rights to his life story were originally acquired by executive producer Josh Wakely, who brought the project to Amazon. It is produced by Amazon MGM Studios.

Ben Watkins is executive producer and showrunner on the series, with Watkins executive producing via Blue Monday, as well as directing of the first two episodes. Michael B. Jordan will executive produce for Outlier Society, with Outlier's president Elizabeth Raposo also serving as executive producer. Lonnie Ali, the widow of Muhammad Ali, and Authentic Brands Group's Corey Salter, Marc Rosen and Matthew Gross are also executive producers on the series, as are Michele Anthony and Boyd Muir. It is also produced by Authentic Studios, Roc Nation, PolyGram Entertainment, a Universal Music Group partner, and Grace: A Storytelling Company.

=== Casting ===
Jaalen Best leads the cast as Cassius Clay/Muhammad Ali. Omari Hardwick and Dana Gourrier were cast as his parents in February 2025. In the same month, Amin Joseph was cast as Sonny Liston in a main role. In April, Kai Parham was cast Ali's brother and boxer Rudy as a series regular, while Michael Ealy was cast as Malcolm X in a recurring role. In May, Giovanni Ribisi, Erica Tazel, Reno Wilson, and Aleks Paunovic joined the series in recurring roles. In October 2026, Chris Jericho was announced as a cast member of the series.

=== Filming ===
Filming took place in Cobourg, Ontario in April 2025, and at the Hamilton-Oshawa Port Authority, an Art Deco style building in Hamilton's North End, in July 2025.

Additional filming locations included Toronto and elsewhere in Hamilton.

== Release ==
All eight episodes premiered on November 4, 2026.

== Reception ==
On the review aggregator website Rotten Tomatoes, the series holds an approval rating of 83%, based on 18 critic reviews, with an average rating of 7.0/10. Metacritic, which uses a weighted average, assigned a score of 74 out of 100, based on 13 critics, indicating "generally favorable" reviews.

Writer and film critic Richard Roeper of RogerEbert.com gave The Greatest a rating of three out of four stars. He praised Jaalen Best's portrayal of Muhammad Ali, the ensemble cast, and the series' historical accuracy, pacing, and fight choreography, while noting occasional heavy-handed social commentary and minor historical inaccuracies. He described the series as a finely crafted portrayal of Ali's early career and social awakening. Andrew Lawrence of The Guardian gave the film three out of five stars, describing it as a straightforward but overly familiar retelling of Ali's early life and career, and calling the series a "missed opportunity" for not exploring the story from his brother Rudy's perspective.
