= Games People Play =

Games People Play may refer to:

- Games People Play (book), a 1964 psychology book by Eric Berne

== Music ==
- "Games People Play" (The Alan Parsons Project song), 1980
- "Games People Play" (Joe South song), 1968; covered by Inner Circle, 1994
- "Games People Play" (The Spinners song), also known as "They Just Can't Stop It (The Games People Play)", 1975
- Games People Play (album), a 1993 album by Pink Cream 69
- The Games People Play (album), a 2012 album by Paul Lamb
- Games People Play, an album by The PeeChees

== Television ==
- Games People Play (1980 TV series), a 1980–1981 American sports show that was broadcast on NBC
- Games People Play (2019 TV series), a 2019 American drama series that airs on BET

=== Episodes ===
- "Games People Play" (90210)
- "The Games People Play" (The Apprentice)
- "Games People Play" (Crash Zone)
- "The Games People Play" (Doctors)
- "Games People Play" (Eureka)
- "Games People Play" (G.P.)
- "The Games People Play" (Holby City)
- "Games People Play" (Las Vegas)
- "Games People Play" (Life Is Wild)
- "Games People Play" (Modern Family)
- "Games People Play" (Party of Five)
- "Games People Play" (Perfect Strangers)
- "Games People Play!" (The Raccoons)
- "Games People Play" (Sex and the City)
- "Games People Play" (Soul Food)
- "Games People Play" (Tripper's Day)
- "Games People Play" (Tyler Perry's House of Payne)
- "Games People Play" (Webster)
- "Games People Play", an episode of Keep It in the Family
