= Ali: An American Hero =

- Genre: Biography; Drama; Sport
- Written by: Jamal Joseph
- Directed by: Leon Ichaso
- Starring: David Ramsey; Clarence Williams III; Joe Morton; Vondie Curtis-Hall; Martin Ferrero; Antonio Fargas; Khalil Kain; Earl Boen; Aaron Meeks
- Music by: Harald Kloser; Thomas Wanker
- Country of origin: United States
- Original language: English

Production
- Executive producer: Thomas Carter
- Producers: Richard M. Rothstein; Ian Sander
- Production location: Los Angeles
- Cinematography: Claudio Chea
- Editor: Michael Schweitzer
- Running time: 120 minutes
- Production companies: Fox Television Studios; Thomas Carter Company

Original release
- Network: Fox
- Release: August 31, 2000

Ali: An American Hero is an American television film which aired on August 31, 2000, on Fox. It chronicles portions of the career of heavyweight boxer Muhammad Ali, who is portrayed by David Ramsey.

== Plot summary ==
Cassius Clay (David Ramsey), winner of the gold medal for boxing in the light heavyweight division at the 1960 Summer Olympics, rises in the professional ranks and defeats heavyweight boxing champion Sonny Liston in a stunning upset to capture the title in 1964. Controversy surrounds his decision to join the Nation of Islam, his name change from Cassius Clay to Muhammad Ali, his friendship with Malcolm X (Joe Morton), and his conscientious objection to the draft during the Vietnam War. Stripped of his title, he eventually recaptures it in 1974 in the so-called "Rumble in the Jungle"—an epic bout against George Foreman in Zaire.

== Cast and chaarcters ==
- David Ramsey as Cassius Clay / Muhammad Ali
  - Aaron Meeks as Young Cassius Clay
- Clarence Williams III as Cassius Clay, Sr.
- Vondie Curtis-Hall as Drew Bundini Brown
- Joe Morton as Malcolm X
- Martin Ferrero as Angelo Dundee
- Amani Gethers as Ernie Terrell
- Antonio Fargas as Elijah Muhammad
- Khalil Kain as Rudy Clay / Rahaman Ali
- Earl Boen as Howard Cosell
- Joe Lala as Ferdie Pacheco
- Marc Coddette as Sonny Liston

== DVD ==
Ali: An American Hero was released on DVD on January 27, 2004.

== See also ==
- King of the World - another 2000 biopic about Ali, airing on ABC.
