= Buck White =

Buck White is the name of:

- Buck White (American football) (1900–1993), player for Chicago Bulls (AFL)
- Buck White (golfer) (1911–1982), American golfer
- Buck White (musical), a 1969 Broadway musical with music by Oscar Brown, see Muhammad Ali in media and popular culture#Music
- Buck White (1930–2025), member of country singing group The Whites with daughters Sharon and Cheryl
