= Ali (2001 film) =

2001 film by Michael Mann

- Theatrical release poster
- Directed by: Michael Mann
- Screenplay by: Michael Mann; Eric Roth; Stephen J. Rivele; Christopher Wilkinson
- Story by: Gregory Allen Howard
- Produced by: Jon Peters; Michael Mann; James Lassiter; Paul Ardaji; A. Kitman Ho
- Starring: Will Smith; Jamie Foxx; Jon Voight; Mario Van Peebles; Ron Silver; Jeffrey Wright; Mykelti Williamson
- Cinematography: Emmanuel Lubezki
- Edited by: William Goldenberg; Lynzee Klingman; Stephen E. Rivkin; Stuart Waks
- Music by: Pieter Bourke; Lisa Gerrard
- Production companies: Columbia Pictures; Peters Entertainment; Forward Pass; Overbrook Films
- Distributed by: Sony Pictures Releasing (United States and Canada); Initial Entertainment Group (International)
- Release dates: December 11, 2001 (Premiere); December 25, 2001 (United States)
- Running time: 159 minutes
- Country: United States
- Language: English
- Budget: $107–118 million
- Box office: $87.7 million

Ali is a 2001 American epic biographical sports drama film co-written, produced and directed by Michael Mann. The film focuses on ten years in the life of the boxer Muhammad Ali, played by Will Smith, beginning with his capture of the heavyweight title from Sonny Liston in 1964 and ending with his reclaiming the title from George Foreman in The Rumble in the Jungle fight of 1974.

The project began in 1992 when producer Paul Ardaji visited Ali on his 50th birthday and persuaded him to allow a new authorized biographical film to be made about his life. Ali had previously starred as himself in the 1977 film The Greatest, which was based on his autobiography of the same name and which covers a similar period of his life. Nearing the end of his option period, Ardaji signed a contract with Sony Pictures, joining forces with producer Jon Peters as producing partner. In February 2000, it was announced that Mann had taken over as a director, following his Academy Award nomination for The Insider. Filming began in Los Angeles on January 11, 2001, on a $105 million budget, shooting took place in New York City, Chicago, Miami, and Mozambique.

Ali was produced by Columbia Pictures, Peters Entertainment, Forward Pass and Overbrook Films and released by Sony Pictures Releasing in the United States and Canada and Initial Entertainment Group internationally on December 25, 2001. The film received positive reviews from critics but was a box-office failure, grossing $87.7 million against a production budget of between $107–118 million. Will Smith and Jon Voight received Academy Award nominations for Best Actor and Best Supporting Actor, respectively.

== Plot ==
Before his championship debut against the heavyweight champion Sonny Liston, Cassius Clay Jr. taunts Liston then dominates the early rounds of the match. Between rounds, Liston asks his corner to apply a substance to his gloves. Liston then takes the advantage in Round 5, as Clay complains of burning eyes and blurred vision to trainer Angelo Dundee. Clay recovers in Round 6 and begins to dominate the fight. Liston quits before round seven, losing the heavyweight championship to Clay, who admonishes the crowd to "Eat your words!"

Clay spends time with Malcolm X and is invited to the home of Nation of Islam leader Elijah Muhammad, where he is given the name Muhammad Ali, much to the disapproval of his father, Cassius Sr. Ali meets Sonji Roi, an ex-Playboy Bunny. He eventually loses his virginity to her. Although she is not Muslim and does not abide sex segregation. Ali goes to Africa and meets up with Malcolm X, but later refuses to speak to him, honoring the wishes of Elijah. He is distraught over the assassination of Malcolm X.

Upon returning to America, Ali fights Liston a second time and knocks him out in the first round. He and Sonji divorce after she objects to various obligations Muslim women have.

Ali then refuses conscription for the Vietnam War and is stripped of his boxing license, passport, and title, and sentenced to five years in prison. After marrying 17-year-old Belinda Boyd and a three-year hiatus from boxing, his conviction is overturned in Clay v. United States, and in his comeback fight, he goes against Jerry Quarry and wins by technical knockout in three rounds. Ali attempts to regain the heavyweight championship against Joe Frazier. In the "Fight of the Century", Frazier generally has the upper hand against Ali and wins by decision, the first loss of Ali's career. Frazier later loses the championship to George Foreman.

Foreman and Ali go to Kinshasa, Zaire, for the Rumble in the Jungle fight. There, Ali meets Veronica Porché and has an affair with her. After reading rumors of his infidelity in newspapers, his wife Belinda travels to Zaire to confront him. Ali says he is unsure whether he loves Veronica, but is focused solely on his upcoming title shot.

For a good portion of the fight against Foreman, Ali leans back against the ropes (Rope-a-dope) allowing Foreman to tire himself out. He then knocks out the exhausted Foreman, regaining the Heavyweight Championship.

== Cast ==
- Will Smith as Cassius Clay Jr. / Muhammad Ali
- Jamie Foxx as Drew Bundini Brown – Ali's assistant trainer
- Jon Voight as Howard Cosell – A journalist
- Mario Van Peebles as Malcolm X – Ali's friend, and a civil rights leader
- Ron Silver as Angelo Dundee – Ali's trainer
- Jeffrey Wright as Howard Bingham – Ali's photographer
- Mykelti Williamson as Don King – A promoter who arranged Ali's fight against Foreman
- Jada Pinkett Smith as Sonji Roi – Ali's first wife and ex-Playboy bunny
- Nona Gaye as Belinda Boyd / Khalilah Ali – A woman who interviewed Ali as a child
- Michael Michele as Veronica Porché – A woman who worked with Don King
- Joe Morton as Chauncey Eskridge – Ali's lawyer
- Paul Rodriguez as Dr. Ferdie Pacheco – Ali's doctor
- Bruce McGill as Bradley – A government agent
- Barry Shabaka Henley as Herbert Muhammad – Ali's manager, and the son of Elijah Muhammad
- Giancarlo Esposito as Cassius Clay Sr. – Ali's father
- Laurence Mason as Luis Sarria
- LeVar Burton as the civil rights leader Martin Luther King Jr.
- Albert Hall as Elijah Muhammad – Leader of the Nation of Islam; Hall previously portrayed Brother Baines, a composite character in the Spike Lee biopic Malcolm X
- David Cubitt as Robert Lipsyte – A journalist
- Michael Bentt as Sonny Liston – The boxing champion at the beginning of the movie
- Robert Sale as Jerry Quarry – One of Ali's opponents
- James Toney as Joe Frazier – One of Ali's opponents
- Charles Shufford as George Foreman – One of Ali's opponents
- David Haines as Rudy Clay / Rahaman Ali – Ali's brother
- Leon Robinson as Brother Joe
- Ted Levine as Joe Smiley – A government agent
- Malick Bowens as Joseph Mobutu – The President of Zaire
- Victoria Dillard as Betty Shabazz – Malcolm X's wife
- David Elliott as Sam Cooke – A musician
- Brad Greenquist as Marlin Thomas
- Graham Clarke as a Reporter in Zaire

== Production ==
The project began in 1992 when producer Paul Ardaji visited Ali on his 50th birthday and persuaded him to authorize the making of the film. Nearing the end of his option period, Ardaji signed a contract with Sony Pictures, joining forces with producer Jon Peters as producing partner. Producer Jon Peters started developing the film in 1994. Gregory Allen Howard wrote the initial draft of the script, which had the working title Power and Grace. Howard's draft focused on Ali's life from 12 to 40 years old, and his relationship with his father. Howard was replaced by writers Stephen J. Rivele and Chris Wilkinson, and by 1998 the biopic was set up at Columbia Pictures, with Will Smith attached to star and the possibility of Ron Howard directing. During the filming of Wild Wild West, Smith presented director Barry Sonnenfeld with the script. Columbia was hoping for filming to start towards the end of 1998, but it was pushed back, and Sonnenfeld exited in November 1999. It was speculated that Columbia was hesitant to move forward with Sonnenfeld following the disappointing box office performance of Wild Wild West. In February 2000, it was announced that Michael Mann had taken over as director, following his Academy Award nomination for The Insider. Prior to Mann's involvement, Spike Lee had been in negotiations to direct the film, feeling that only a black man could do justice to Ali's story. Smith, however, preferred Mann, who turned down the opportunity to direct early versions of The Aviator, Shooter and Savages to commit to Ali, and brought Eric Roth on to co-write the script. After years of being attached to the Ali biopic, Smith officially signed on in May 2000 with a $20 million salary.

Filming began in Los Angeles on January 11, 2001, on a $105 million budget. Shooting also took place in New York City, Chicago, Miami and Mozambique.

One of the selling points of the film is the realism of the fight scenes. Smith worked alongside boxing promoter Guy Sharpe from SharpeShooter Entertainment, and his lead fighter Ross Kent, to get the majority of his boxing tips for the film. All of the boxers in the film are former or current world heavyweight championship–caliber boxers. It was quickly decided that 'Hollywood fighting'—passing the fist (or foot) between the camera and the face to create the illusion of a hit—would not be used in favor of actual boxing. The only limitation placed upon the fighters was for Charles Shufford (who plays George Foreman). He was permitted to hit Smith as hard as he could, so long as he did not actually knock the actor out.

Smith had to gain weight to look the part of Muhammad Ali.

== Release ==
Ali received its world premiere as the Royal Film Performance on December 11, 2001 at the Empire, Leicester Square in London, attended by Charles, Prince of Wales. It opened in the United States on December 25, 2001.

== Reception ==
=== Box office ===
Ali grossed a total of $14.7 million in 2,446 theaters during its opening weekend. The film went on to gross a total of $87.7 million worldwide.

Due to its high production and marketing costs, the film ended up losing Columbia Pictures as much as $100 million. The film's failure was partly due to its competition with The Lord of the Rings: The Fellowship of the Ring.

=== Critical response ===
On review aggregator website Rotten Tomatoes, Ali holds an approval rating of 69% based on 154 reviews, with an average rating of 6.30/10. The site's critics consensus: "Though perhaps no film could fully do justice to the fascinating life and personality of Muhammad Ali, Mann's direction and Smith's performance combine to pack a solid punch." On Metacritic, the film has a weighted average score of 65 out of 100, based on 39 critics, indicating "generally favorable" reviews. Audiences polled by CinemaScore gave the film an average grade of "B+" on an A+ to F scale.

Roger Ebert derided the film with two stars in his review for the Chicago Sun-Times, and mentioned, "it lacks much of the flash, fire and humor of Muhammad Ali and is shot more in the tone of a eulogy than a celebration". In Variety magazine, Todd McCarthy wrote, "The director's visual and aural dapplings are strikingly effective at their best, but over the long haul don't represent a satisfactory alternative to in-depth dramatic scenes; one longs, for example, for even one sequence in which Ali and Dundee discuss boxing strategy or assess an opponent", but he did have praise for the performances: "The cast is outstanding, from Smith, who carries the picture with consummate skill, and Voight, who is unrecognizable under all the makeup but nails Cosell's distinctive vocal cadences". USA Today gave the film two and half stars out of four and stated that, "for many Ali fans, the movie may be good enough, but some perspective is in order. The documentaries a.k.a. Cassius Clay and the Oscar-winning When We Were Kings cover a lot of the same ground and are consistently more engaging".

In The New York Times, Elvis Mitchell proclaimed Ali to be a "breakthrough" film for Mann, adding that it was his "first movie with feeling" and that "his overwhelming love of its subject will turn audiences into exuberant, thrilled fight crowds". J. Hoberman, in his review for the Village Voice, felt that the "first half percolates wonderfully—and the first half hour is even better than that. Mann opens with a thrilling montage that, spinning in and out of a nightclub performance by Sam Cooke, contextualizes the hero in his times", and concluded that, "Ali's astonishing personality is skillfully evoked but, in the end, remains a mystery".

When Ali died on June 3, 2016, Smith was chosen to be one of Ali's pallbearers for the memorial service in Louisville.

== Accolades ==
Award	Category	Recipient	Result	Ref.
Academy Awards	Best Actor	Will Smith	Nominated	
Academy Awards	Best Supporting Actor	Jon Voight	Nominated	
BET Awards	Best Actor	Will Smith	Won	
BET Awards	Best Actress	Jada Pinkett Smith	Nominated	
Black Reel Awards	Best Film		Nominated	
Black Reel Awards	Best Actor	Will Smith	Nominated	
Black Reel Awards	Best Supporting Actor	Jamie Foxx	Won	
Black Reel Awards	Best Supporting Actress	Nona Gaye	Won	
Black Reel Awards	Best Screenplay (Original or Adapted)	Gregory Allen Howard	Won	
Black Reel Awards	Best Song	"The World's Greatest" – R. Kelly	Nominated	
Black Reel Awards	Best Soundtrack		Won	
Black Reel Awards	Best Film Poster		Nominated	
Chicago Film Critics Association Awards	Best Supporting Actor	Jon Voight	Won	
Critics' Choice Awards	Best Picture		Nominated	
Critics' Choice Awards	Best Actor	Will Smith	Nominated	
Critics' Choice Awards	Best Supporting Actor	Jon Voight	Nominated	
Dallas–Fort Worth Film Critics Association Awards	Best Actor	Will Smith	Nominated	
Dallas–Fort Worth Film Critics Association Awards	Best Supporting Actor	Jon Voight	Nominated	
ESPY Awards	Best Sports Movie		Nominated	
Golden Globe Awards	Best Actor in a Motion Picture – Drama	Will Smith	Nominated	
Golden Globe Awards	Best Supporting Actor – Motion Picture	Jon Voight	Nominated	
Golden Globe Awards	Best Original Score	Pieter Bourke and Lisa Gerrard	Nominated	
Golden Reel Awards	Best Sound Editing – Music – Feature Film (Domestic and Foreign)	Kenneth Karman, Lisa Jaime, Vicki Hiatt, Stephanie Lowry, and Christine H. Luethje	Nominated	
Golden Schmoes Awards	Most Overrated Movie of the Year		Nominated	
Golden Trailer Awards	Best Drama		Nominated	
Jupiter Awards	Best International Actor	Will Smith	Won	
Make-Up Artists and Hair Stylists Guild Awards	Best Period Makeup – Feature	Judy Murdock	Nominated	
Make-Up Artists and Hair Stylists Guild Awards	Best Special Make-Up Effects – Feature	Mark Garbarino and Nick Marra	Nominated	
MTV Movie Awards	Best Male Performance	Will Smith	Won	
NAACP Image Awards	Outstanding Motion Picture		Won	
NAACP Image Awards	Outstanding Actor in a Motion Picture	Will Smith	Won	
NAACP Image Awards	Outstanding Supporting Actor in a Motion Picture	Jamie Foxx	Won	
NAACP Image Awards	Outstanding Supporting Actor in a Motion Picture	Mario Van Peebles	Nominated	
NAACP Image Awards	Outstanding Supporting Actress in a Motion Picture	Jada Pinkett Smith	Nominated	
Prism Awards	Theatrical Feature Film		Won	

== Alternate versions ==
Ali was released theatrically in 2001 at a length of 157 minutes; this version was released on DVD in 2002. Mann then re-edited the film, creating a new Director's Cut that ran 165 minutes and was released on DVD in 2004; approximately 4 minutes of theatrical footage was removed, while 14 minutes of previously unseen footage was inserted. The Director's Cut also featured an audio commentary by Mann.

In 2016 Mann created a third cut, significantly re-editing the film in the wake of Ali's death. He deleted one fight and added scenes and footage focusing on the political side of Ali's life. This version runs 152 minutes and was released in 2017 on Blu-Ray as the Commemorative Edition.

== See also ==
- List of boxing films
