= Freedom Road =

1979 American TV historical mini-series

- Genre: Historical mini-series
- Based on: Freedom Road by Howard Fast
- Directed by: Jan Kadar
- Starring: Muhammad Ali; Kris Kristofferson

Production
- Executive producer: Zev Braun
- Producers: Leland Nolan; Chet Walker
- Cinematography: Charles Correll

Original release
- Network: NBC
- Release: October 29 – October 30, 1979

Freedom Road is a 1979 American TV historical drama mini-series starring boxer Muhammad Ali and Kris Kristofferson, based on the 1944 novel by Howard Fast and directed by Jan Kadar. Running for four hours, it was first broadcast on NBC on October 29 and 30, 1979.

== Plot ==
Ali plays ex-slave Gideon Jackson, a former Union soldier who returns to his home in South Carolina following the American Civil War and ultimately becomes a U.S. senator. The film and Fast's novel are based on a true story, but they take a number of liberties. (Jackson was also the inspiration for the villain in D. W. Griffith's racist propaganda film The Birth of a Nation.)

Initially representing black ex-slaves at the state's constitutional convention, Jackson is elected to the state legislature and eventually to the U.S. Senate despite opposition from white landowners, law enforcement, and the Ku Klux Klan. Kristofferson plays sharecropper Abner Lait, who helps Jackson unite former slaves and white tenant farmers.

== Production ==
The cast includes Barbara O. Jones (as Jackson's wife), Ron O'Neal, Edward Herrmann, John McLiam (as Ulysses S. Grant), Sonny Jim Gaines, Joel Fluellen, Grace Zabriskie and Alfre Woodard. It is narrated by Ossie Davis.

It was the final film of director Jan Kadar, who died in June 1979. It had a $7 million budget and was filmed around Natchez, Mississippi because of the historic property in the area.

== Critical reaction ==
The St Petersburg Times found that Ali was not entirely convincing but showed potential, and that his quiet performance failed to convey Jackson's charisma. The Encyclopedia of Television Film Directors calls it "intermittently compelling".

== See also ==
- Muhammad Ali in media and popular culture
