= Paul Ardaji =

American film producer

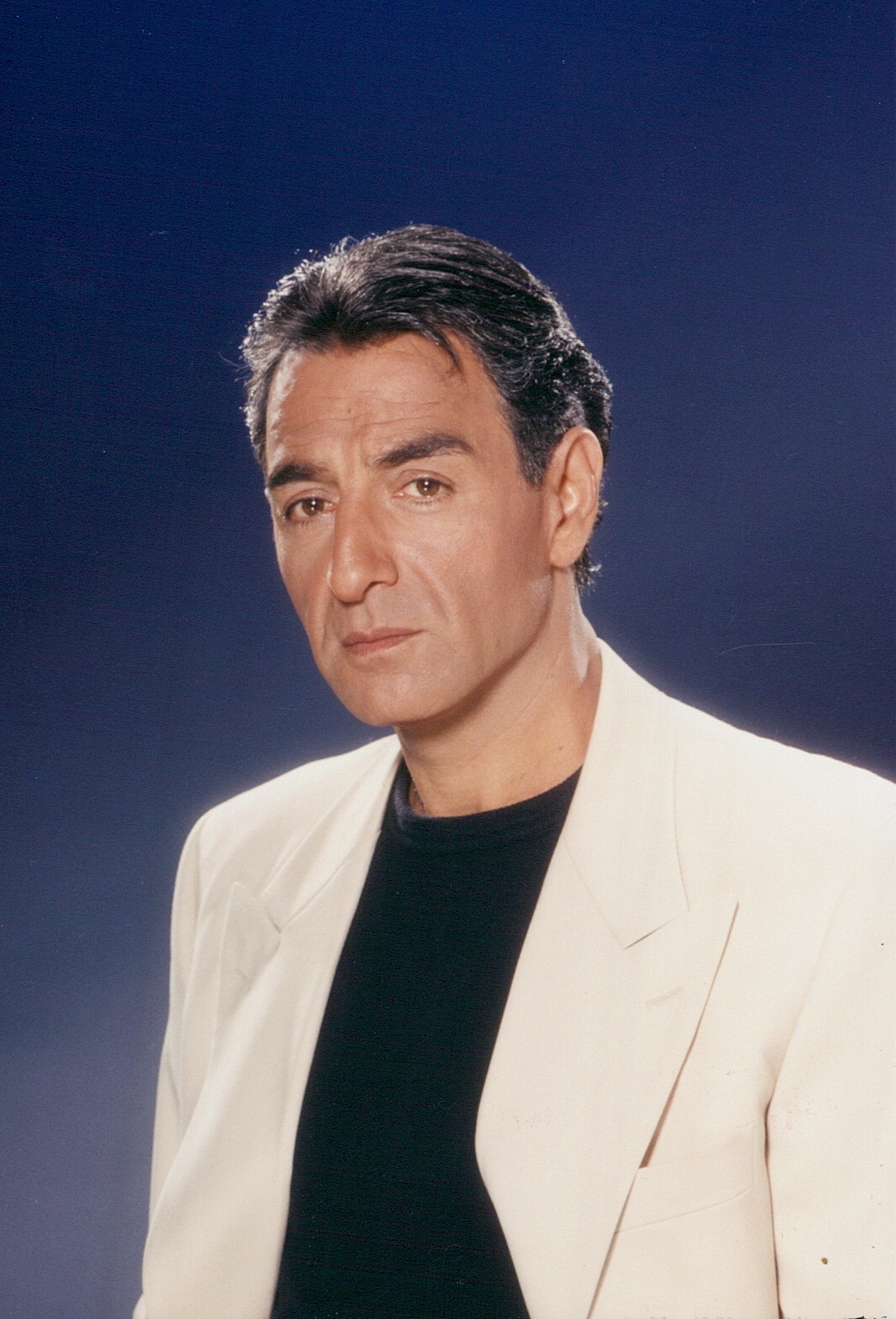
- Born: Paul W. Ardaji; Jerusalem
- Occupation(s): film producer, restaurateur

Paul W. Ardaji is an American film producer, former international advertising and marketing executive, and restaurateur. Ardaji is particularly known for his role as producer during the early stages of production for the 2001 American film Ali, a biographical dramatization of the life of boxer Muhammad Ali.

== Early career ==
Ardaji founded the Middle East Advertising and Marketing Company (Meamco), a New York-based marketing agency focusing on Arab markets.

In 1979, Ardaji signed boxer Muhammad Ali as a spokesperson for Toyota in Saudi Arabia and the Persian Gulf region. The famous boxer's voice was broadcast from radios across the Persian Gulf region, boosting Toyota vehicle sales in the region by 18%. For decades, Ardaji maintained a close friendship with Ali and eventually came to realize Ali's film potential. This crucial initial connection later allowed Ardaji to be able to obtain the rights to Ali's life story for the film Ali in 1992.

In 1984, Ardaji became the president of Horizon/Meamco after Meamco's merger with Horizon. During the mid-1980s, it was the third largest marketing agency serving the Middle East, and filled in a highly crucial gap for connecting Western products to consumers in Arab cultures.

== Film industry ==
In 1992, Ardaji founded Roundhill Pictures Corporation and obtained the film rights to Muhammad Ali's life story. In 1992, Ardaji had visited Ali on his 50th birthday and persuaded him to allow a film to be made about his life.

Signing on with Sony Pictures, Ardaji then partnered with producer Jon Peters, who started developing the film in 1994. In addition to Ardaji and Peters, other film producers of Ali were Michael Mann, James Lassiter, and A. Kitman Ho. All five producers were given equal credit as for their roles in the film's production. In 2000, Michael Mann became director of the Ali film, which was finally released in 2001 and featured Will Smith as the main star.

== Later career ==
Later, Ardaji went into the restaurant business and founded Terra Ristorante Italiano with Boston-based chef Ken Oringer in Greenwich, Connecticut, which was featured in the New York Times. Continuing their close friendship from the 1970s, Muhammad Ali continued to visit Ardaji during Ardaji's later days as a restaurateur.

In 2005, Ardaji launched Asian fusion cuisine chain Paulimotos Asian Bistro with Japanese chef Masaharu Morimoto of Iron Chef, with locations throughout the U.S. East Coast.
