= List of Soul Food episodes =

Soul Food is an American television drama series that aired on Showtime from June 28, 2000 to May 26, 2004.

== Series overview ==
Season	Episodes	Originally released	
Season	Episodes	First released	Last released
1	20	June 28, 2000	January 24, 2001
2	20	June 27, 2001	February 13, 2002
3	10	June 26, 2002	August 28, 2002
4	10	April 9, 2003	June 11, 2003
5	14	February 24, 2004	May 26, 2004

== Episodes ==
=== Season 1 (2000–01) ===
As the series premieres, six months have passed since the events of the 1997 motion picture upon which the series is based. The major principal cast members are Rockmond Dunbar (Kenny), Darrin Dewitt Henson (Lem), Aaron Meeks (Ahmad), Nicole Ari Parker (Teri), Malinda Williams (Bird) and Vanessa A. Williams (Maxine). Recurring cast members include Boris Kodjoe (Damon) and Irma P. Hall (reprising her film role as Big Mama). The opening theme song -- "The Way Love Goes"—is composed by Kenneth "Babyface" Edmonds and Al Green, and performed by Green himself.

No. overall	No. in season	Title	Directed by	Written by	Original release date	Prod. code
1	1	"The More Things Change"	Eriq La Salle	Felicia D. Henderson	June 28, 2000	0101
The Joseph family celebrates the birth of Bird and Lem’s son Jeremiah. Now divorced from Miles (Isaiah Washington), Teri goes on a date with Damon Carter, a well-educated delivery man in his twenties. Water damage to Big Mama’s house forces Bird, Lem, Jeremiah and Uncle Pete to move in with Teri (Boyz II Men's "A Song for Mama" -- which was used as the theme song for the 1997 motion picture—is heard briefly at the beginning of the opening scene).
2	2	"The More Things Stay the Same"	Oz Scott	Felicia D. Henderson	July 5, 2000	0102
The Joseph sisters file a lawsuit against their late father’s business partner (Richard Roundtree) over ownership of the local grocery store that the two men owned. Ahmad has problems adjusting to his new private school. Tensions and mixed feelings linger between Teri and Miles. Unemployed and desperate for money, Lem begins working as a courier for his drug-dealing cousin Franco (Richard Chevolleau).
3	3	"Heart of the Matter"	Kevin Hooks	Patricia Green	July 12, 2000	0103
Teri is forced to confront her feelings about Miles when he prepares to leave Chicago with his band (Case, Montell Jordan, R.L., Jazz (from Dru Hill), and Musiq Soulchild). The sisters ask Hardy Lester’s ex-wife (Gloria Foster) to testify against him. Lem narrowly avoids arrest, thanks to the intervention of his cousin Jack (Gary Dourdan), a police detective.
4	4	"What Women Want"	Oz Scott	Charles D. Holland	July 19, 2000	0104
The grocery store lawsuit goes to trial. Jack finds work for Lem, but it turns out to be a stolen credit card scam. Bird returns to work at the salon.
5	5	"The Watermelon Theory"	Jeff Woolnough	Salim Akil	July 26, 2000	0105
Teri defends a corporate racist, to the chagrin of her family and her colleague Josefina (Eva LaRue). Jack involves Lem in more felonious activity. Bird, Lem, Jeremiah and Uncle Pete move back into Big Mama’s house. Ahmad accidentally walks in while Kenny is masturbating.
6	6	"Claiming"	Tim Hunter	Kevin Arkadie & Troy Beyer	August 2, 2000	0106
Maxine befriends one of the only other African-American parents from Ahmad’s school. Teri meets Damon’s father and stepmother. With Lem out of work again, he decides to help Kenny at Chadway Towing; the two become embroiled in a dangerous conflict with a rival towing company.
7	7	"Truth Be Told"	Kevin Hooks	Felicia D. Henderson	August 9, 2000	0107
Damon finally meets the rest of the Joseph family. Hardy Lester tries to avoid the court order awarding 50% ownership of the grocery store to the sisters. Teri & Damon are mugged by a man who was Teri's class mate in highschool.
8	8	"Bad Luck"	Helaine Head	Charles D. Holland	August 16, 2000	0108
Maxine and Teri clash over the preparations for Ahmad’s 12th birthday party. Arrested while trying to purchase a bootleg video game for Ahmad, Kenny is persecuted by the interrogating police detective (Bokeem Woodbine) and jailed with a mentally unstable prisoner (Lamont Bentley).
9	9	"Anything You Can Do"	Unknown	Unknown	August 23, 2000	0109
Maxine mortgages her one-third ownership in Big Mama’s house to invest in an IPO; Lem uses some of his ill-gotten gain to invest as well. Ahmad befriends Callie (Tamara Hope), a female student at his school. Teri and Damon decide to try being friends instead of lovers.
10	10	"Samurai Secrets"	Unknown	Unknown	August 30, 2000	0110
Jack becomes a huge problem for Lem. Maxine realizes that Kenny and Teri attended a concert together in high school after their break-up . . . but she remains unaware of a deeper secret. Damon begins tutoring Ahmad in French.
11	11	"Man Trouble"	Unknown	Unknown	September 6, 2000	0111
Maxine gets the wrong idea when she finds a seemingly used condom in Ahmad’s pocket. Teri’s friendship with her colleague Brian (Yannick Bisson) becomes complicated after she catches him having sex with a junior attorney at the firm. Jack disappears . . . with people on both sides of the law hunting him down.
12	12	"The Language of Life"	Unknown	Unknown	September 13, 2000	0112
Bird discovers that Lem has been lying about his employment status. Damon is offered a job as a German language interpreter; he and Teri redefine their relationship once again. A marital crisis draws in the entire Joseph family.
13	13	"Ordinary Pain"	Unknown	Unknown	December 6, 2000	0113
Teri, Maxine and Bird are shocked to discover that they have a half-sister (Tyra Banks), and that she wants to bury her recently deceased mother alongside their father. Ahmad’s fascination with a comic book superheroine interferes with his studies for the PSAT.
14	14	"Nice Work If You Can Get It"	Unknown	Unknown	December 13, 2000	0114
After Hardy Lester has a heart attack, Lem agrees to manage the grocery store on his behalf. Separated from Lem, Bird goes out on a date with the brother (Chris Spencer) of one of the clients from her salon. When Damon’s younger brother (Cirroc Lofton) is thrown out of Harvard Law School, their father (James Avery) is furious . . . and Damon is caught in the middle.
15	15	"Little Girl Blue"	Unknown	Unknown	December 20, 2000	0115
Teri catches the eye of one of Greene Norris’ most important clients (Dennis Haysbert), just as the firm decides whether she should become a partner. When Kenny learns that one of the male stylists at Bird’s salon is gay, he decides that the man (Michael Ealy) should no longer associate with Ahmad. A street entrepreneur tries to force Lem to sell his cookies at the grocery store. Damon’s ex-girlfriend Christine (Anais Granofsky) shows up at his doorstep.
16	16	"This Crazy Life"	Unknown	Unknown	December 27, 2000	0116
One of Bird’s customers holds her husband hostage at the salon . . . along with Bird and Lem. After disobeying Maxine, Ahmad runs away to avoid the consequences.
17	17	"Sometimes You Win, Sometimes You Lose"	Unknown	Unknown	January 3, 2001	0117
Having been passed over for partnership, Teri is determined to prevail in the airline lawsuit. Kenny finds himself attracted to his new assistant Lila (Nicki Micheaux). Bird and Lem take steps toward reconciliation.
18	18	"Everything is Unfolding Perfectly"	Unknown	Unknown	January 10, 2001	0118
After a girl from the neighborhood is struck by a speeding car, Maxine begins a crusade to have speed bumps installed on the block, much to the annoyance of her local alderman (Kimberly Scott). Ahmad tries to make amends with the girl (Nicole Hardy), who holds a grudge against him for a past wrong. One of Teri’s clients, a psychiatrist, convinces her to begin confronting some of her issues.
19	19	"A Clear and Present Stranger"	Unknown	Unknown	January 17, 2001	0119
When Kenny’s father (Obba Babatundé) visits before relocating to Florida, years of childhood resentment come to the surface. Lem tries to help an old friend who was recently released from prison. Damon inadvertently reignites Teri’s interest in the piano, for which she has little talent.
20	20	"Take Me to the Water"	Unknown	Unknown	January 24, 2001	0120
When Ahmad attends baptism class at church, friction develops between him and the pastor (Charlie Robinson). Teri meets with the senior partners about her status at the firm. A happy occasion for the Joseph family suddenly turns tragic.

=== Season 2 (2001–02) ===
At the start of Season 2, a new version of the opening theme song is introduced, performed by Al Green and Sy Smith. This version is used for the remainder of the series. Boris Kodjoe becomes a regular cast member. A new opening credit sequence includes childhood pictures of the cast members (a device also used in the 1997 motion picture).

No. overall	No. in season	Title	Directed by	Written by	Original release date	Prod. code
21	1	"The Aftermath"	Felicia D. Henderson	Felicia D. Henderson	June 27, 2001	0201
Over a week after the car accident, Bird and Kenny remain hospitalized. Maxine starts running the towing business in Kenny’s absence, while Teri helps take care of her nephews and nieces. Lem can barely contain his anger at Damon, whom he blames for the accident.
22	2	"Welcome Home"	Ken Girotti	Charles D. Holland	July 4, 2001	0202
Having resigned from Greene Norris, Teri helps take care of Kenny, who is extremely frustrated during his recuperation at home. Damon’s guilt over the accident begins to interfere with his relationship with Teri. Ahmad shares a kiss with his girlfriend Keisha . . . and later does the same with his friend Callie. Lem admits to Bird that he has felt less attracted to her since the accident.
23	3	"Who Do You Know?"	Janet Davidson	Salim Akil	July 11, 2001	0203
Bird and Maxine are furious when they catch Lem and Kenny at a strip club. After Josefina gets engaged, Teri pressures her into asking her fiancé to sign a prenuptial agreement. Soon thereafter, Teri’s first husband Russell (Michael Jai White) -- a professional football player—pays her a visit, allowing the pair to address unresolved issues. Ahmad’s history report partner takes advantage of him.
24	4	"God Bless the Child"	Ken Girotti	Seanne Kemp Kovach	July 18, 2001	0204
Lem’s mother Lynette (Debbi Morgan) shows up, leading to more twists and turns in their complicated mother-son relationship. A frustrated Kenny continues to snap at Maxine, which infuriates Ahmad. Teri starts to have panic attacks. Ahmad tries to make up with Keisha.
25	5	"Sex and Money"	Dianah Wynter	Kathleen McGhee-Anderson	July 25, 2001	0205
Teri is offered a partnership at Moore & Freeman, a predominantly African-American law firm; she also provides legal assistance to an older woman (Mary Alice) from her church. With help from his friend Reggie (Kevin Rashaan Grant), Ahmad begins selling bootleg pornographic movies to his fellow students at Lakeside Prep. Damon decides to pursue a career in sports management . . . and then makes an extremely bad decision in his personal life. Bird and Lem begin to argue over the household finances.
26	6	"Come Back for the Comeback"	Jeff Woolnough	Charles D. Holland	August 1, 2001	0206
The Joseph sisters’ cousin Faith (Lisa Branch), who once had a one-night stand with Teri’s second husband Miles, is brought up on federal criminal charges. Teri is pressured into representing her opposite Bob Wayne (Christopher B. Duncan), a ruthless prosecutor. Kenny returns to work, but Maxine is not ready to return to life as a homemaker. Damon’s brother Anthony introduces him to his first prospective client—a top college basketball player. Teri’s secretary Gloria (Kathryn Winslow), who is White, crosses paths with a racist African-American employee at the new firm.
27	7	"Games People Play"	Jeffrey W. Byrd	Michael Ajakwe Jr.	August 8, 2001	0207
Teri begins dating a famous law school classmate (Djimon Hounsou), and soon finds herself facing him in a nasty courtroom battle. Lem and Bird become alarmed when Kenny’s reliance upon painkillers approaches a dangerous level. Lila admits to Kenny that she is in love with him.
28	8	"Life Lessons"	Oz Scott	Eric Haywood	August 15, 2001	0208
Ahmad deliberately flunks a pair of math quizzes in order to spend time with a tutor: a gorgeous 10th grade student. Teri is eager to defend a former Moore & Freeman client (Kenneth "Babyface" Edmonds) in a sexual harassment suit when she learns that his accuser is being represented by her old law firm, Greene Norris. Damon’s father offers to invest in his new sports management company, but Damon turns him down in order to maintain autonomy.
29	9	"The Root"	Stephen Surjik	Clayvon C. Harris	August 22, 2001	0209
Lem is thrilled when the grocery store makes a huge quarterly profit, but soon feels disrespected when Teri and Maxine dismiss his plans to reinvest the money in the business. One of the stylists (Curtis McClarin) at Bird’s salon begins poaching his co-workers’ clients. Teri has two more panic attacks; Ahmad and Brian are each present for one of them. Kenny and Damon have their first conversation since the car accident.
30	10	"Never Can Say Goodbye"	Oz Scott	Charles D. Holland & Seanne Kemp Kovach	August 29, 2001	0210
Maxine and Kenny accuse Ahmad’s basketball coach (William Allen Young) of promoting basketball over academics, and of doing so because Ahmad is African-American. The basketball coach has heartfelt conversation while a notable guest on the show, Kid #5 with backpack (Jonathan Krehling) gets ready to take his networking certification exam. But they regret making the complaint after the coach, Lakeside Prep’s only African-American teacher, is fired. The aftermath of Teri and Damon’s break-up continues, as Teri confronts Christine and Brian confronts Damon. Hardy Lester’s schemes finally catch up with him, as the court awards full ownership of J&H Groceries to the Joseph sisters.
31	11	"I'm Afraid of Americans"	Jeffrey W. Byrd	Salim Akil	September 5, 2001	0211
One of the Chadways’ neighbors is brutalized by the police, which leads to a full-scale riot on Chicago’s South Side. Lem encounters his old partner in crime Philky (Treach), and tries to mentor Avery (Jascha Washington), a preteen drug dealer who looted the grocery store. Kenny has huge problems with the media’s depiction of African-American men . . . and of his own family (Cameo appearances by Kweisi Mfume, Willie T. Barrow, Johnnie Cochran, John Oakley, Larry Elder, Aaron McGruder, Michael Eric Dyson and Michael Pfleger as themselves).
32	12	"Running as Fast as I Can"	Monty DeGraff	Kathleen McGhee-Anderson & Sean Ryerson	September 12, 2001	0212
Maxine runs for political office in an effort to unseat Teresa Davis, the alderman with whom she clashed a year earlier. Davis attacks Maxine’s decision to send Ahmad to Lakeside Prep using school vouchers. Teri’s decision to act as Maxine’s campaign manager creates problems for her at Moore & Freeman. This was the first episode aired following the attack of September 11.
33	13	"Fly Away Home"	Oz Scott	Rick Hawkins	September 19, 2001	0213
Bird accepts a position as personal hair stylist for R&B singer Deborah Cox (who appears as herself). But her decision to join Cox on a six-month tour threatens to ruin her marriage. After being missing for six months, Lem’s cousin Jack finally reappears. Teri forces the entire Joseph family to sever ties with Damon, but she is forced to see him on a regular basis when Moore & Freeman provides him with office space for his new company.
34	14	"If You Don’t Know Me By Now. . ."	Ken Girotti	Eric Haywood	September 26, 2001	0214
An arsonist burns J&H Groceries to the ground, and Lem is wrongfully arrested for the crime. Bob Wayne joins Moore & Freeman as a new partner, and agrees to defend Lem along with Teri. Ahmad and another boy get into a fight over Keisha. Chadway Towing’s application for a contract with the state of Illinois consumes most of Kenny’s time. Startling revelations about Jack come to light.
35	15	"From Dreams to Nightmares"	Michael McMurray	Charles D. Holland	January 9, 2002	0215
With the family unable to pay his bail, Lem sits in jail . . . and Kenny refuses to let Ahmad communicate with him. Meanwhile, Ahmad has terrible nightmares about the whole situation. Lem receives invaluable assistance from a surprising source. Damon gets his first client: a hockey player (John-Patrick Mavric) who constantly cheats on his pregnant wife (Guest appearance by Drake, who is credited as Aubrey Graham).
36	16	"A Taste of Justice"	Salim Akil	Kathleen McGhee-Anderson	January 16, 2002	0216
With the charges against him dismissed, Lem teams up with Philky to find the real arsonist. When Kenny’s oldest daughter Kelly (Taylor Love) gets into a confrontation with a boy on her soccer team, Kenny and the boy’s father end up trading punches. Lem is stunned to discover that Avery is still alive. Teri’s aggressive approach continues to ruffle feathers at Moore & Freeman.
37	17	"Help"	Sean Ryerson	Charles D. Holland & Salim Akil	January 23, 2002	0217
With pressure continuing to mount at work, Teri’s panic attacks escalate, prompting Bird and Damon to urge her to seek professional help. Kenny acquires a loan that allows him to obtain a towing contract with the city of Chicago . . . and to hire Lem at Chadway Towing. Lem and Bird’s use of erotic massage oil has some very unwanted consequences.
38	18	"Lovers and Other Strangers"	Salim Akil	Eric Haywood	January 30, 2002	0218
Lynette seeks Lem’s help when things go sour with her latest live-in boyfriend (Clark Johnson). Maxine catches her father-in-law in a compromising position with Lila. Teri begins searching for a therapist. Bird finds herself uncomfortable with the way Lynette displays affection for Lem.
39	19	"In Transition"	Clark Johnson	Charles D. Holland & Kathleen McGhee-Anderson	February 6, 2002	0219
Teri finally finds a therapist who can help her deal with her panic attacks, but her career at Moore & Freeman is in complete free fall. Ahmad has had enough of Keisha’s ups and downs, and Damon has had enough Kevin Tucker. Several of Kenny’s employees start demanding more money. Reggie gets his cousin, a stripper, to dance for Ahmad.
40	20	"This Must Be Love"	Felicia D. Henderson	Story by : Felicia D. Henderson & Wendy Coulas; Teleplay by : Felicia D. Henderson & Seanne Kemp Kovach	February 13, 2002	0220
The Chadways’ 13th wedding anniversary is ruined when Maxine finds a letter delivered in the mail that Lila wrote to Kenny. Convinced that Kenny is cheating on her, Maxine drives to Milwaukee to confront Lila . . . with all three of her children in town. Damon’s thoughtless treatment of Christine has tragic consequences, and the guilt he feels is almost unbearable. One of Bird’s clients makes a pass at her, mistakenly believing that Bird is bisexual.

=== Season 3 (2002) ===
At the start of Season 3, a new opening credit sequence is introduced, depicting the seven major cast members interacting with each other backstage on the Soul Food set.

No. overall	No. in season	Title	Directed by	Written by	Original release date	Prod. code
41	1	"Tonight at Noon"	Robert Townsend	Salim Akil	June 26, 2002	0301
Burke Willis Bingham & Lockhart, a huge New York-based law firm, acquires Greene Norris as its Chicago office. Senior partner Katherine Burke (Faye Dunaway) makes Teri the managing partner of the Chicago office, effectively positioning Teri as the superior of the very same attorneys who refused make her a partner a year earlier. A month after Christine’s suicide, a guilt-ridden Damon believes that he is being haunted by her ghost. Maxine and Kenny remain separated, and things between them are not improving. Teri’s new position also makes her head of the firm’s labor law department, leaving Brian on the verge of resigning.
42	2	"Ultimate Power"	Jeff Byrd	Kathleen McGhee-Anderson	July 3, 2002	0302
After a burglar breaks into the Chadway house, Maxine decides to buy a gun . . . which does not sit well with Kenny at all. Lem admits to Bird that he has a gun in their home. Teri has some challenging decisions to make when a major client (Rip Torn) wants her to handle all of his business. Damon finally makes peace with Christine’s death. One of Ahmad’s teachers refuses to let him use the restroom during class, which sparks a protest among the student body.
43	3	"Past Imperfect"	Salim Akil	Felicia D. Henderson & Seanne Kemp Kovach	July 10, 2002	0303
Bird encounters her high school algebra teacher Michael King (Kent Faulcon), with whom she had a sexual relationship as a teenager. The workers at Chadway Towing gossip about what may or may not have happened between Kenny and Lila. Ahmad needs a tuxedo to attend his friend Mike’s (Bradley Reid) 13th birthday party. Teri and Damon’s relationship gets more complicated.
44	4	"Out with the Old . . ."	Salim Akil	Kenya Barris	July 17, 2002	0304
When one of Lem’s friends (Charles Malik Whitfield) asks him for help in setting up a legitimate business, Lem solicits assistance from Baron Marks (Michael Warren), a hustler turned entrepreneur who was once involved with his mother Lynette. Bird prepares for a hair styling competition, with Ahmad filming everything for a school assignment. Kevin Tucker and Maxine work together on a cooking television show, but she is outraged when she catches him cheating on his wife. Teri grows tired of Brian’s attitude, until he hints at his true feelings for her.
45	5	"Empty Spaces"	Sean Ryerson	Eric Haywood	July 24, 2002	0305
With their relationship improving, Maxine and Kenny go out on a date. Teri and Damon find it increasingly difficult to determine if they are friends, lovers or both. Lem takes a lucrative business proposal to one of Kenny’s competitors . . . the same proposal that Kenny rejected weeks earlier. Maxine gets a part-time job working at a shelter for battered women and their children.
46	6	"Stranger Than Fiction"	David Warry-Smith	Kathleen McGhee-Anderson & Wendy Coulas	July 31, 2002	0306
Kenny returns home, and Ahmad feels pushed aside now that he is no longer “man of the house”. Bob Wayne wonders if Teri and one of her corporate clients are purposely smearing his reputation. Bird does a makeover segment on Chicago Update, and befriends Eva Holly (Terri J. Vaughn), one of the show’s producers. Kenny, Lem and Damon enjoy a night out together.
47	7	"Child Safety"	Salim Akil	Story by : Thad Mumford & Felicia D. Henderson; Teleplay by : Felicia D. Henderson & Thad Mumford	August 7, 2002	0307
Ahmad witnesses a drug-related murder, and Lem puts him into hiding for his own safety. Kenny finds it difficult to trust Lem, who takes extraordinary steps to protect Ahmad. When Kevin Tucker’s womanizing continues, he winds up with something he never wanted.
48	8	"Let's Do It Again"	Ken Girotti	Ralph Greene	August 14, 2002	0308
Maxine and Kenny attend couples therapy, and soon decide to renew their wedding vows. Bird lets prejudice get the best of her when a White family moves next door to the Van Adamses. Teri and Damon are in synch romantically, but realize that they are a true odd couple as housemates.
49	9	"Big Dreams in Small Spaces"	David Warry-Smith	Wendy Coulas	August 21, 2002	0309
Teri and Maxine object to Bird and Lem’s remodeling plans for Big Mama’s house, prompting the Van Adamses to decide that the time has come to move out. Ahmad and Reggie plan to try out for the football league in order to impress girls. The Joseph sisters are flooded with memories of their final years with their parents. Ahmad becomes frustrated with the way that Teri acts like a second mother instead of an aunt.
50	10	"Emotional Collateral"	Bethany Rooney	Salim Akil	August 28, 2002	0310
Maxine risks her job at the Transition House to help Estella (Kimberly Elise), a new client. Damon joins CGR Sports Management, and meets problem client Benny Jones (Terrence Howard). Kenny, Lem and Ahmad prepare Sunday dinner. Damon proposes to Teri.

=== Season 4 (2003) ===
No. overall	No. in season	Title	Directed by	Written by	Original release date	Prod. code
51	1	"All Together Alone"	Felicia D. Henderson	Eric Haywood	April 9, 2003	0401
Michael King stalks Bird and tries to rape her; the sisters fear that Lem will kill the man if he finds out. Damon develops a drinking problem, but is far from admitting it to himself. Maxine and Kenny are mortified when Ahmad catches them having sex . . . in the kitchen.
52	2	"Life 101"	Anais Granofsky	Seanne Kemp Kovach	April 16, 2003	0402
Soon after Lem’s 27th birthday, Bird finds out that she is pregnant. But Lem is furious when she decides to have an abortion. Teri is offered an adjunct faculty position at Northwestern University School of Law. Ahmad starts dating Keisha again. Teri’s panic attacks return.
53	3	"The New Math"	Salim Akil	Felicia D. Henderson & Salim Akil	April 23, 2003	0403
When Kelly receives extremely low standardized test scores, Maxine and Kenny blame the school. Benny Jones becomes Damon’s client from hell, assaulting ESPN sportscaster Stuart Scott (who appears as himself) and accidentally shooting his baby’s mother. Teri tries to help a young woman who had to drop out of law school at Northwestern. With Kenny’s help, Lem converts the attic of Big Mama’s house into a home gym.
54	4	"Truth’s Consequences"	Sean Ryerson	Kevin Lance Collins	April 30, 2003	0404
The Joseph sisters’ Aunt Ruthie (Diahann Carroll) visits from Hattiesburg, Mississippi, clashing with the entire family except Teri. Damon’s alcoholism worsens. Reggie’s new girlfriend Lauren cheats on him . . .with Ahmad.
55	5	"Shades of Grey"	Darnell Martin	Kenya Barris	May 7, 2003	0405
Bird offers her support when Eva breaks up with her girlfriend. Maxine convinces Kenny to hire Lionel Willock (Troy Winbush), a man with Asperger syndrome. As punishment for their cavalier attitudes about tolerance, Ahmad and his friend Jamie are forced to complete reports on the rites of passage ceremonies from each other’s culture. Teri serves on a jury, and annoys all of her fellow jurors with her superior attitude.
56	6	"My Brother's Keeper"	Kevin Arkadie	Kathleen McGhee-Anderson	May 14, 2003	0406
Ahmad and Callie start an underground newspaper at Lakeside Prep after a student drops what resembles a suicide note into the school newspaper's suggestion box. Lionel receives an inheritance from his former employer. The Chadways and Van Adamses try to convince Damon not to give Teri his grandmother’s engagement ring, which they think is ugly.
57	7	"Attracting Opposites"	Michael McMurray	Eric Haywood & Wendy Coulas	May 21, 2003	0407
After Bird shares a kiss with Eva, her sisters wonder if she is gay. Baron’s son Cameron (Usher) arrives in town and starts undermining Lem. Ahmad begins to have erotic dreams.
58	8	"Sacrifice Fly"	Dianne Houston	Salim Akil & Kenya Barris	May 28, 2003	0408
Kenny and Damon permit Tobias (Chris Collins), a teenage baseball pitcher, to practice with a professional player . . . and blame themselves when the boy is permanently disabled after a line drive strikes him in the head. Bird and Lem realize that Teri has one of their homemade sex tapes. Tobias' uncle (Idris Elba) is furious with Kenny, his high school football teammate. (Stuart Scott appears as himself.)
59	9	"Nobody’s Child"	Sean Ryerson	Kathleen McGhee-Anderson & Seanne Kemp Kovach	June 4, 2003	0409
Estella abandons her son Mandel (Tyson Fennell), and leaves him with Maxine. Cameron’s scheming catches up with him, and he is forced to ask Lem for help. Damon hides the fact that he resigned from CGR. Lauren and several other girls become very curious about one of Ahmad’s body parts.
60	10	"Falling from Grace"	Felicia D. Henderson	Felicia D. Henderson	June 11, 2003	0410
Damon’s secrets are exposed. Tobias returns home from the hospital. Estella returns and demands custody of Mandel, but has to fight the boy's new foster parents: Teri and Damon. One of the Joseph sisters is unable to stop her man from leaving her.

=== Season 5 (2004) ===
The opening credit sequence from the past two seasons is retained, though with all traces of Boris Kodjoe removed due to his departure from the main cast at the previous season's end. Kodjoe does return as a guest star in the final two episodes though.

No. overall	No. in season	Title	Directed by	Written by	Original release date
61	1	"Pagan Poetry"	Unknown	Unknown	February 24, 2004
Ahmad faces the realities of being a Black man in America when he is questioned by the police for purse snatching, and several people from Lakeside Prep assume the worst about him. FBI Agent Willie White (Jim Brown) blackmails Lem into becoming an informant against Baron, who has become like a father to Lem. Two months after Damon left her, Teri has become uncharacteristically promiscuous.
62	2	"Two to Tango"	Unknown	Unknown	March 3, 2004
Maxine asks a nationally renowned educator (Vernee Watson-Johnson) to help Kelly with her learning disability. Teri reacts in all the wrong ways when she meets a courier who reminds her of Damon. Bird sparks a firestorm of controversy when she insults a Black community activist on the air . . . and refuses to apologize. One of the disagreements between the sisters lingers longer than it should.
63	3	"The Son Also Rises"	Unknown	Unknown	March 10, 2004
Kenny’s brother Kelvin (Hill Harper) arrives, with news that their mother has leukemia and needs a bone marrow transplant. Agent White continues to pressure Lem by getting the IRS to audit Bird’s salon. Ahmad joins a two-day exchange program so he can attend a public high school on the South Side, but is surprised when Callie fits in there better than he does. Lem resigns from Chadway Towing.
64	4	"We Plan"	Unknown	Unknown	March 17, 2004
Teri tries to help a Muslim-American businesswoman (Mishu Vellani) who has been harassed by the U.S. government since the September 11 terrorist attacks. Malik Todd (Terrell Tilford), the new director of the Sojourner Truth House, promotes Maxine to head of fundraising . . . a full-time position. Damon’s mother arrives in Chicago and demands the return of her mother’s engagement ring, which Damon gave to Teri.
65	5	"Decisions and Choices"	Unknown	Unknown	March 24, 2004
Strapped for cash, Kenny allows an old friend (Marc Gomes) to use Chadway Towing as a movie set, but is shocked when he learns that the films are pornographic. Maxine, a dark-skinned Black woman, is upset when Ahmad appears to prefer White girls and light-skinned Black girls. After years as Teri’s closest platonic friend, Brian professes his love for her.
66	6	"A Rock Hard Place"	Unknown	Unknown	March 31, 2004
Bird learns about the FBI investigation of Baron, and Lem’s relationship with Baron comes to a sad conclusion. Teri and Brian secretly begin dating. Malik makes a pass at Maxine. Teri enrolls in a tango class, and is partnered with Charles Miller (Vondie Curtis-Hall).
67	7	"Survival Techniques"	Unknown	Unknown	April 7, 2004
With Baron dead, one of his associates tries to extort money from Lem . . . by kidnapping Bird. Teri and Charles slowly begin to become friends. Lem is forced to accept help from Agent White. Ahmad becomes frustrated with the lack of African-American culture at Lakeside Prep.
68	8	"Angelitos Negros"	Unknown	Unknown	April 14, 2004
Kelvin reveals that he is HIV-positive, and Kenny and Maxine mishandle the situation. After the kidnapping, Bird pushes Lem away . . . and ends up sleeping with Malik. Teri goes on a weekend trip with Charles to his cabin on the lake.
69	9	"Successful Failure"	Unknown	Unknown	April 21, 2004
A disagreement about their mother’s gravestone leads to the biggest argument that the Joseph sisters have ever had. Teri and Charles lose the tango competition, but gain something much better. Lem decides to open a grocery store of his own. Maxine discovers that she is pregnant. The expansion of Alliance Towing continues to create financial problems for the Chadways. (Immediately following the initial broadcast of this episode, Showtime airs "Dense", a short film directed and co-written by Vanessa A. Williams.)
70	10	"Love Me or Leave Me"	Unknown	Unknown	April 28, 2004
Lem learns the truth about Bird and Malik. Kenny and Al (Tony Sciara) start doing repo work, and soon discover how dangerous it can be. Unable to talk to Lem or her sisters, Bird begins to fall apart. Teri’s job starts to interfere with her relationship with Charles. Lem starts to grow closer to Nyla (Mari Morrow). (Immediately following the initial broadcast of this episode, Showtime airs "Violation", a short film directed by Darrin Dewitt Henson.)
71	11	"Take It to the Limit"	Unknown	Unknown	May 5, 2004
Lem tells Kenny about Bird’s affair with Malik, setting in motion a chain of events that costs Maxine her job. Teri finds herself unable to accept Charles’ unique relationship with his ex-wife (Bahni Turpin). Lem reaches the point of no return with Nyla. (Immediately following the initial broadcast of this episode, Showtime airs "The Great Commission", a short film directed by Rockmond Dunbar.)
72	12	"In the Garden"	Unknown	Unknown	May 12, 2004
Aunt Ruthie (Diahann Carroll) returns to inform the sisters that Uncle Pete has died, and to repair the rift between her nieces. Teri and Maxine finally learn about Bird’s abduction, and try to place the blame on Lem. Ahmad meets his girlfriend’s mother, who was recently released from prison.
73	13	"Fear Eats the Soul"	Unknown	Unknown	May 19, 2004
Now clean and sober, Damon returns to make amends with Teri, and to inform her that he has gained temporary custody of Mandel. Lem is hospitalized and undergoes an emergency appendectomy. Kenny finally accepts a buyout offer from Alliance Towing. Teri accepts an offer to head her law firm’s Atlanta office . . . as a name partner.
74	14	"Don't Think This Hasn't Been Fabulous"	Salim Akil	Kathleen McGhee-Anderson	May 26, 2004
After initially rejecting Damon’s marriage proposal, Teri changes her mind and the two finally become husband and wife. Lem is devastated when his store is vandalized, but the support of the family changes everything. Maxine solidifies her long-term career plans, and Teri leaves Burke Willis for good. Kelly returns home from boarding school. Ahmad has a final conversation with the spirit of Big Mama (In an homage to the 1997 motion picture, Ahmad speculates that he might one day write a screenplay about his family's experiences).
