= Odessa Grady Clay =

Muhammad Ali's mother (1917–1994)

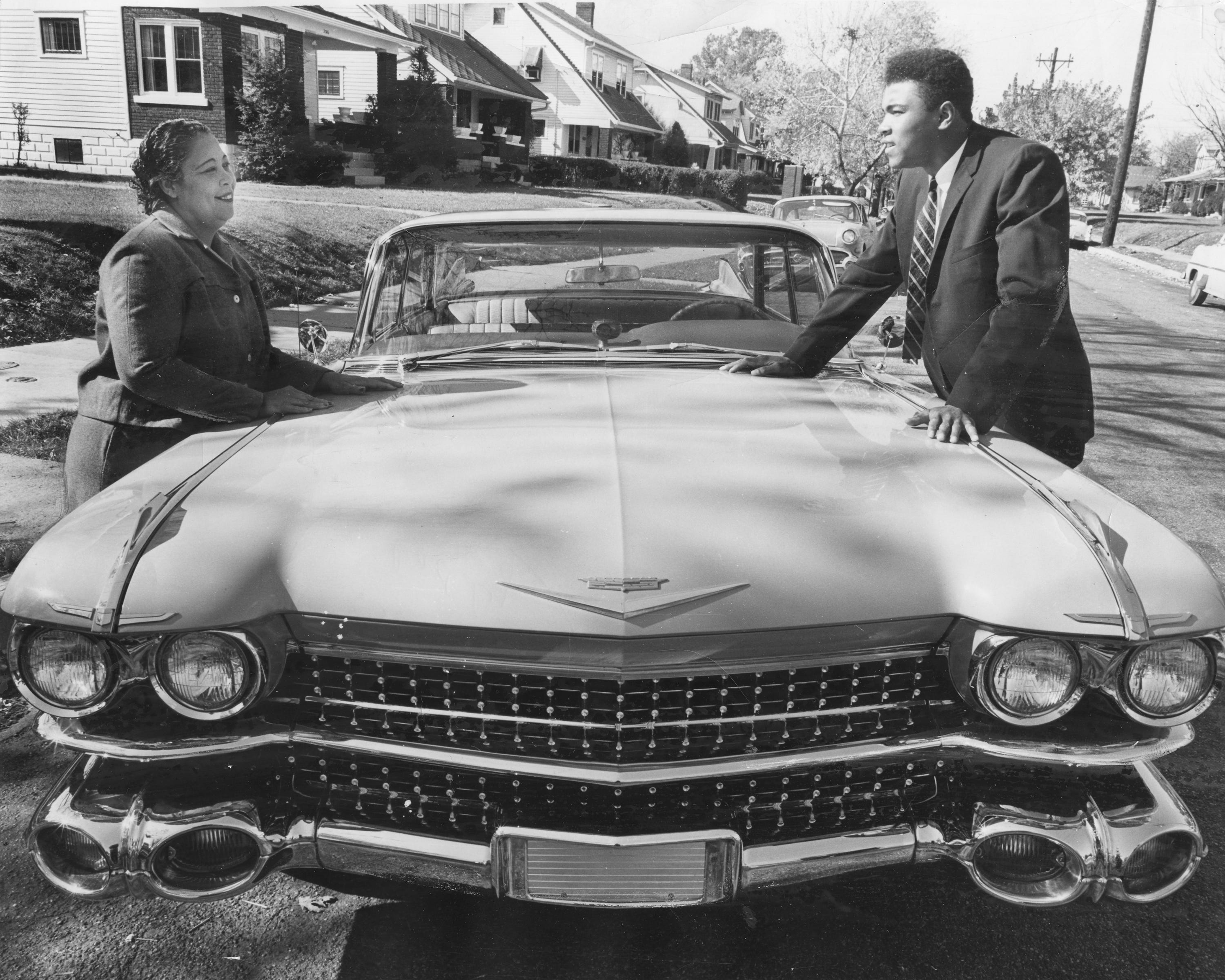
- Clay (left) and her son Muhammad Ali with a Cadillac he bought for his parents in 1960
- Born: Odessa Lee O'Grady; February 12, 1917; Hopkins County, Kentucky, U.S.
- Died: August 20, 1994 (aged 77); Louisville, Kentucky, U.S.
- Occupation: Housewife
- Spouse: Cassius Marcellus Clay, Sr. (m. 1934; died 1990)
- Children: Muhammad; Rahaman

Odessa Lee Clay (née O'Grady; February 12, 1917 – August 20, 1994) was the mother of three-time world heavyweight champion Muhammad Ali and Rahman Ali, and the paternal grandmother of Laila Ali. She married Cassius Marcellus Clay Sr. in the 1930s and worked for some time as a household domestic to help support her young children. She supported and inspired her son throughout his boxing career and was a ring-side regular at his bouts.

== Early life ==
She was born in Hopkins County, Kentucky, one of six children of John Lewis O'Grady and Birdie B. Morehead. Her paternal grandfather was an Irishman named Abe O'Grady, who emigrated to the United States from Ennis, County Clare, soon after the Civil War and married Susan "Susie" Walker, the daughter of freed slaves Lewis and Amanda J. "Mandy" Walker of Todd County, Kentucky. Her maternal grandfather, Tom Morehead, was the son of a white man whose surname was Morehead and a slave woman named Dinah. Morehead served in the 122nd United States Colored Troops during the war.

Clay's parents separated when she was young, and her mother worked as a maid, taking care of the household chores and the young children of a white family. Clay was raised partly by her aunt. When she became an adolescent, she dropped out of school and also found work as a domestic. Then, when she was sixteen years old, she met twenty-year-old Cassius, whom everyone referred to as "Cash". They soon married and settled into their own house in Louisville, Kentucky. The Clays' marriage was troubled. Ali told boxing promoters, "She's afraid of him."

== Influence on Muhammad Ali ==
Through her strong Christian belief, Clay had a great influence on the life and spiritual upbringing of both of her sons. Muhammad Ali later said, "My mother is a Baptist, and when I was growing up, she taught me all she knew about God. Every Sunday, she dressed me up, took me and my brother to church, and taught us the way she thought was right. She taught us to love people and treat everybody with kindness. She taught us it was wrong to be prejudiced or hate. I've changed my religion and some of my beliefs since then, but her God is still God; I just call him by a different name. And my mother, I'll tell you what I've told people for a long time. She's a sweet, fat, wonderful woman, who loves to cook, eat, make clothes, and be with family. She doesn't drink, smoke, meddle in other people's business, or bother anyone, and there's no one who's been better to me my whole life."

Clay supported and inspired her son throughout his boxing career. At small gyms early in her son's career and later at international arenas when he became world-famous, Clay traveled with her son and was a ring-side regular at his bouts. Muhammad Ali was much closer to his mother, whom he lovingly called "Bird", "because she's as sweet and pretty as a bird", than to his father. After discovering boxing, it was his mother with whom he shared his dreams of greatness.

== Final years ==
Clay's husband died in 1990. Odessa Clay died of heart failure on August 20, 1994, aged 77, at Hurstbourne Health Center, a nursing home in the Louisville, Kentucky, area. She had been disabled by a stroke since February 1994.

Odessa Clay appeared as herself in the film documentaries Muhammad Ali: The Whole Story (1996) and When We Were Kings (1996). In the 1977 film The Greatest, Odessa Clay was portrayed by Dorothy Meyer, and in the 2001 film Ali she was portrayed by Candy Ann Brown. She was also portrayed by Dana Gourrier in 2026 sports television series The Greatest.
