= Off Their Plate =

COVID-19 nonprofit in Boston, 2020–2023

Off Their Plate (OTP) was a nonprofit founded in March 2020 in Boston, Massachusetts run entirely by volunteers. Their goal was to provide economic relief to restaurants as well as deliver meals to frontline healthcare workers during the COVID‑19 pandemic.

== History ==
Harvard Medical School student, Natalia Guo, founded OTP after her surgical rotation was suspended in March 2020.

Working with Boston chefs Tracy Chang and Ken Oringer, OTP raised about $80,000 in its first ten days and delivered roughly 1,000 meals to local hospitals.

Within a month, they were up and running in nine U.S. cities and had raised $2.9 million, providing an estimated 289,000 meals and 90,000 paid hours for restaurant staff.

By June 2021 OTP had distributed more than 763,000 meals in 473 communities nationwide.

The organization officially sunset operations in May 2023.

== Model ==
Off Their Plate operated a "double-impact" model, which gave 100 percent of donations to their restaurant partners. Each participating restaurant was required to allocate at least half of the funds toward employee wages, with the remainder covering the cost of preparing meals. The organization described a $100 donation equivalent to ten meals for frontline workers and three hours of paid labor for restaurant staff.

== Recognition ==
- In 2021, founder Natalie Guo was named a national honoree in the L'Oréal Women of Worth program for her work with Off Their Plate.
- That same year she received the Eagle Rare Life Award, which carried a $50,000 grant to support OTP's operations.

== See also ==
- World Central Kitchen
