= Renee Valente =

American film producer

Renée Valente Smidt (July 15, 1927 – February 20, 2016) was an American film and television producer, as well as casting executive. Valente produced more than 70 films and television movies, including A Storm in Summer, which earned her a Daytime Emmy Award in 2001. She also received an Emmy nomination 1979 as the producer of the Blind Ambition, a television miniseries which starred Martin Sheen and Rip Torn.

Valente became the first female President of the Producers Guild of America (PGA) during the 1980s. She also served as the female Vice President of Screen Gems & Columbia Pictures Television, the first woman to hold that position.

Valente, who was from New York, began her career as a part-time secretary for producer David Susskind at his production company, Talent Associates. She was eventually promoted to Talent's head of production. Valente departed Talent Associates to become a producer at NASA, where she produced a series of specials for the space agency. She then joined Screen Gem as the executive of talent and casting. Her credits as a television casting executive during the 1970s and 1980s included Circle of Fear, The Partridge Family and Police Woman.

In 1985, the Casting Society of America (CSA) honored Valente at the first annual Artios Awards. She also received a Women in Film Crystal + Lucy Award from Women in Film in 1987.

Renee Valente died at her home in Studio City, California, on February 20, 2016, at the age of 88. Her husband, art director Burr Smidt, died in 2000 after 40 years together. Valente and Smidt had originally met on the set of the 1961 television film, The Power and the Glory, which starred Laurence Olivier, Julie Harris and George C. Scott.
