= Jamie Bissonnette =

American chef

Jamie Bissonnette is an American restaurateur and chef. He and Ken Oringer were joint owners of a number of restaurants under “JK Food Group” Greater Boston area. He is a recipient of the 2014 Best Chef Northeast for the James Beard Foundation Awards, a prestigious culinary award. He was nominated for the award in 2012 and 2013.

== Early life ==
Before he found success as a chef, he was described as a CTHC, "Connecticut punk-rock kid, straight-edge and vegetarian." After culinary school he travelled and staged and at one point "his boss threatened to fire him if he didn't start eating animals."

== Career ==
He earned a Culinary Arts degree from The Art Institute of Fort Lauderdale at age 19. He travelled and staged, landing in Hartford, before settling in Boston. He has worked in Peking Tom's, Pigalle, Andy Husband's Tremont 647, and Eastern Standard. In 2007, Oringer hired him to "head up the kitchen" at KO Prime. His work was noticed and "the Improper Bostonian named Bissonnette “Rising Star Chef” and KO Prime “Best New Restaurant.”" In 2014 his first book, The New Charcuterie Cookbook: Exceptional Cured Meats to Make and Serve at Home, was published by Page Street Publishing.

== Awards and honors ==
- 2014 Best Chef Northeast for the James Beard Foundation Awards, considered to be the Oscars of the culinary world; nominated in 2012 and 2013.
- Food & Wine People's Best New Chef award, He was the first to win that award.
- He won $10,000 on The Food Network show Chopped
