= Soul Food (TV series) =

American drama television series (2000–2004)

- Genre: Family drama
- Based on: Soul Food by George Tillman Jr.
- Developed by: Felicia D. Henderson
- Starring: Rockmond Dunbar; Darrin Dewitt Henson; Boris Kodjoe; Aaron Meeks; Nicole Ari Parker; Malinda Williams; Vanessa Estelle Williams
- Narrated by: Aaron Meeks
- Theme music composer: Kenneth "Babyface" Edmonds; Al Green
- Opening theme: "The Way Love Goes", performed by: Al Green (season 1); Al Green and Sy Smith (seasons 2–5)
- Country of origin: United States
- Original language: English
- No. of seasons: 5
- No. of episodes: 74 (list of episodes)

Production
- Production companies: Water Walk Productions (seasons 3–5); Edmonds Entertainment; State Street Pictures; Fox Television Studios (seasons 1–2); 20th Century Fox Television (seasons 3–5); Showtime Networks; Paramount Network Television

Original release
- Network: Showtime
- Release: June 28, 2000 – May 26, 2004

Related
- Soul Food (1997 film)

Soul Food is an American drama television series that aired on Showtime from June 28, 2000, to May 26, 2004. Developed for television by Felicia D. Henderson, the series was an adaptation of George Tillman Jr.'s 1997 film of the same name, which was based on his childhood experiences growing up in Chicago.

== Premise ==
Soul Food follows the triumphs, struggles, and rivalries of the Josephs, a tight-knit African-American family living in Chicago, Illinois. The series picks up six months after the events in the 1997 film, starting with the birth of Bird and Lem's son Jeremiah, as the family tries to hold together after the death of the Joseph sisters' mother Josephine (Irma P. Hall, reprising her role in flashback sequences), usually referred to as Mama, Mother Joe, or Big Mama.

== Cast ==
- Rockmond Dunbar as Kenny Chadway, replacing Jeffrey D. Sams from the original film
- Darrin Dewitt Henson as Lem Van Adams, replacing Mekhi Phifer from the original film
- Aaron Meeks as Ahmad Chadway, replacing Brandon Hammond from the original film
- Nicole Ari Parker as Teri Joseph, replacing Vanessa Williams from the original film
- Malinda Williams as Tracy "Bird" Joseph Van Adams, replacing Nia Long from the original film
- Vanessa Estelle Williams as Maxine Joseph Chadway, replacing Vivica A. Fox from the original film
- Boris Kodjoe as Damon Carter (recurring season 1; regular seasons 2–4; guest season 5)

== Episodes ==
Season	Episodes	Originally released	
Season	Episodes	First released	Last released
1	20	June 28, 2000	January 24, 2001
2	20	June 27, 2001	February 13, 2002
3	10	June 26, 2002	August 28, 2002
4	10	April 9, 2003	June 11, 2003
5	14	February 24, 2004	May 26, 2004

== Response ==
Soul Food was one of the first long-running and successful dramatic series on television to feature a predominantly African-American cast. Short-lived series such as Under One Roof and City of Angels featured predominantly black casts but never gained recognition due to lack of ratings and viewership. The show dealt in topics of politics, homosexuality, racial discrimination, and certain forms of abuse (drug, domestic, and sexual). Because it aired on Showtime, there was use of mild profanity and partial nudity. Several episodes even served as launching pads for upcoming new music artists. Many known performers such as Gerald Levert, Montell Jordan, India Arie, Sunshine Anderson and Common have made guest appearances as well.

== Popularity ==
The show received five NAACP Image Awards nominations for Outstanding Drama Series and won three consecutive times in 2002, 2003, and 2004. Also, a three-book series was launched in 2002.

The Soul Food cast was interviewed by comedian Mo'Nique about fan reaction to the series. The cast considered that fans of the show would approach them at different places, including the airport, and would talk to them about storylines that they enjoyed or disliked. Nicole Ari Parker commented on studio executives telling the cast and crew that they were not marketable overseas; yet, after the show ended, the series garnered a fanbase in France.

== Syndication ==
In 2003, BET acquired the rights to air reruns of the series (in the United States). The episodes have been edited to allow for commercials, and to meet FCC content standards for basic cable networks. BET aired syndicated reruns of Soul Food for a long time, until it shifted the series to its sister network, BET J (now known as BET Her). On March 15, 2010, the principal cast members (except for Rockmond Dunbar), appeared together on the BET late-night talk show The Mo'Nique Show. TV One began airing reruns of the series in January 2012. Syndication rights are currently held by Aspire, which began airing reruns of the series in January 2016.

== Home releases ==
On June 24, 2003, Paramount Home Entertainment (under the Showtime Entertainment label) released the first season of Soul Food: The Series on DVD, just two weeks after the series wrapped its fourth season.

After a long delay, the remaining four seasons were released in 2007 and 2008 by Paramount Home Entertainment (through CBS Home Entertainment, because of CBS Corporation acquiring pre-2006 Viacom, including Showtime Networks).

While season one (billed as "the complete first season") runs in its uncut, complete form, the remaining other seasons did not, primarily due to music licensing issues, and some episodes being edited from their original versions, primarily due to expensive costing issues while trying to go back to their original, unedited versions.

International rights to the series are held by The Walt Disney Company via 20th Television, and 20th Century Home Entertainment has yet to release DVD sets in other territories.

DVD name	Ep #	Release date
Season 1	20	June 24, 2003
Season 2	20	August 7, 2007
Season 3^	20	February 5, 2008
Fourth & Final Season	14	July 8, 2008
Complete Series	74	July 8, 2008

^ The 20-episode DVD release of "Season 3" actually contains the 10 episodes in Season 3 and the 10 episodes in Season 4.

== Awards and nominations ==
Status	Year	Award	For
Winner	2001	NAACP Image Award	Outstanding Youth Actor/Actress - Aaron Meeks
Winner	2002	NAACP Image Award	Outstanding Drama Series
Winner	2002	NAACP Image Award	Outstanding Supporting Actress in a Drama Series - Debbi Morgan
Winner	2002	NAACP Image Award	Outstanding Youth Actor/Actress - Aaron Meeks
Winner	2003	NAACP Image Award	Outstanding Drama Series
Winner	2003	NAACP Image Award	Outstanding Actress in a Drama Series - Vanessa A. Williams
Winner	2004	NAACP Image Award	Outstanding Drama Series
Nominee	2001	Emmy Award	Outstanding Main Title Theme Music - Kenneth "Babyface" Edmonds and Al Green
Nominee	2001	NAACP Image Award	Outstanding Drama Series
Nominee	2001	NAACP Image Award	Outstanding Actress in a Drama Series - Nicole Ari Parker
Nominee	2001	NAACP Image Award	Outstanding Actress in a Drama Series - Vanessa A. Williams
Nominee	2001	NAACP Image Award	Outstanding Supporting Actress in a Drama Series - Irma P. Hall
Nominee	2002	NAACP Image Award	Outstanding Actress in a Drama Series - Nicole Ari Parker
Nominee	2002	NAACP Image Award	Outstanding Supporting Actor in a Drama Series - Kenneth "Babyface" Edmonds
Nominee	2002	NAACP Image Award	Outstanding Supporting Actor in a Drama Series - Boris Kodjoe
Nominee	2003	NAACP Image Award	Outstanding Actress in a Drama Series - Nicole Ari Parker
Nominee	2003	NAACP Image Award	Outstanding Actress in a Drama Series - Malinda Williams
Nominee	2003	NAACP Image Award	Outstanding Supporting Actor in a Drama Series - Boris Kodjoe
Nominee	2003	NAACP Image Award	Outstanding Supporting Actor in a Drama Series - Aaron Meeks
Nominee	2003	NAACP Image Award	Outstanding Supporting Actress in a Drama Series - Kimberly Elise
Nominee	2003	Young Artist Award	Best Performance in a TV Series (Comedy or Drama) - Supporting Young Actor - Aaron Meeks
Nominee	2004	NAACP Image Award	Outstanding Actress in a Drama Series - Nicole Ari Parker
Nominee	2004	NAACP Image Award	Outstanding Actress in a Drama Series - Malinda Williams
Nominee	2004	NAACP Image Award	Outstanding Actress in a Drama Series - Vanessa A. Williams
Nominee	2004	NAACP Image Award	Outstanding Supporting Actor in a Drama Series - Darrin Dewitt Henson
Nominee	2004	NAACP Image Award	Outstanding Supporting Actor in a Drama Series - Boris Kodjoe
Nominee	2004	NAACP Image Award	Outstanding Supporting Actress in a Drama Series - Terri J. Vaughn
Nominee	2004	Young Artist Award	Best Performance in a TV Series (Comedy or Drama) - Supporting Young Actor - Aaron Meeks
Nominee	2005	NAACP Image Award	Outstanding Drama Series
Nominee	2005	NAACP Image Award	Outstanding Actress in a Drama Series - Nicole Ari Parker
Nominee	2005	NAACP Image Award	Outstanding Actress in a Drama Series - Malinda Williams
Nominee	2005	NAACP Image Award	Outstanding Actress in a Drama Series - Vanessa A. Williams
Nominee	2005	NAACP Image Award	Outstanding Supporting Actor in a Drama Series - Darrin Dewitt Henson
Nominee	2005	NAACP Image Award	Outstanding Supporting Actress in a Drama Series - Diahann Carroll
