= Jaalen Best =

American actor

- Best in 2026
- Education: East Carolina University
- Occupation: Actor
- Years active: 2022-present

Jaalen Best (born June 1, 1998) is an American actor. He has the lead role of Cassius Clay in biographical television series The Greatest (2026).

== Early life ==
From Clinton, North Carolina, Best initially wanted to be a professional basketball player. He attended East Carolina University, where he took acting classes in his junior year in 2019. He went on to portray Chief Powhatan in a stage production of Pocahontas in his hometown. After graduating, he moved to Los Angeles to pursue an acting career.

== Career ==
He portrayed Ryan Craig on the CW’s All American: Homecoming. He also appeared in episodes of Magnum P.I. and American Horror Stories.

In 2024, he was cast to play Cassius Clay in The Greatest, an upcoming biopic of Muhammad Ali from Amazon Prime Video, with the series depicting from 1960 when Clay won the Olympic gold medal and ending in 1964 when became the world heavyweight champion for the first time. Filming took place in Canada from 2025, with broadcast scheduled for 2026. Best described the portrayal as “one of the most humbling, terrifying, exhilarating, inspiring all at once, all together situations for me". Speaking about the casting of Best, Ali's wife Lonnie Ali who was involved in the production said that Best had "to have the courage and the conviction, the heart. He's got to have the looks. All of it. Muhammad was pretty...[he] had to have 'the package' as they say. Because [Ali] did".

== Filmography ==
Key
†	Denotes works that have not yet been released

Year	Title	Role	Notes
2022	American Horror Stories	Hot Guy	1 episode
2023	All American: Homecoming	Ryan Craig	3 episodes
2023	Magnum P.I.	Teammate number 1	1 episode
2026	The Greatest†	Cassius Clay	Lead role
