= Boyd Muir =

American music industry executive

- Occupation(s): Executive Vice President, Chief Financial Officer, President of Operations
- Years active: 1984 – present
- Organization: Universal Music Group

Boyd Muir is Executive Vice President, Chief Financial Officer and President of Operations for Universal Music Group.

== Career ==
Muir's music industry career began in the entertainment media division of Ernst & Young in London, where he served from 1984 until 1991. He then served as the head of internal audit at EMI from 1991 to 1994, and was closely involved with the company's acquisition of Virgin Music and Chrysalis Records.

In 2010, Lucian Grainge named Muir the CFO of Universal Music Group. As CFO, Muir oversees global finance operations, including asset management, information technology, accounting and supply chain. Muir also led a number of acquisitions for the company, including Sanctuary Group, V2 Music Group, Ingrooves Music Group, as well as Universal Music Group's 2013 acquisition of EMI.

=== Other UMG ventures ===
In addition to his roles as CFO and executive vice president, Muir is also the chair of the Universal Music's compliance committee, which oversees the head of global compliance. He is also the Member of Executive Management Board at UMG.

== Industry honors and achievements ==
Muir has been recognized every year since his appointment as CFO on the Billboard Power 100. He is credited with revising UMG's digital structure, developing a playlist strategy, and bringing in new talent to head the company's film, television, and theater department. Muir also made the list in 2014 at #37.
