= Ken Oringer =

American chef

Ken Oringer (born 1965 in Paramus, New Jersey) is a Boston-based chef who is a business partner of Jamie Bissonnette.

== Education ==
Oringer studied restaurant management at Bryant College in Rhode Island (class of 1987) followed by a degree from the Culinary Institute of America in Hyde Park, New York. His classmates voted him Most Likely to Succeed

== Career ==
His first job after graduation was at River Café in New York, followed by a pastry chef position at Al Forno in Providence, Rhode Island and as sous chef under Jean-Georges Vongerichten at the Marquis de Lafayette in Boston. Next, he briefly operated Terra Ristorante Italiano, founded by restaurateur Paul Ardaji in Greenwich, Connecticut, which won three stars from The NY Times.

In 1992, Oringer moved to San Francisco and became chef de cuisine at Silks in the Mandarin Oriental Hotel. Conde' Nast Traveler magazine listed Silks as "one of the top 20 restaurants in America." Raves followed in Gourmet.

In 1995, Oringer returned to Boston, and won praise for his work at Tosca in suburban Hingham. Within a year, the restaurant was dubbed "Best on the South Shore," and Oringer was profiled on CNN. In 1997, he opened Clio in Boston's Eliot Hotel. Clio has been a Gourmet magazine Top Table. Oringer has also appeared on several Food Network shows, as guest, cook and winning contestant. Clio was closed in 2015.

Other restaurants include the Japanese-fusion restaurant, Uni - which was expanded, taking over the space formerly occupied by Clio, tapas restaurant Toro, Mexican taqueria La Verdad, and the enoteca Coppa, organic restaurant Earth at Hidden Pond opened in Kennebunkport, in 2011, and a second Toro outpost in New York.

In 2016, Oringer and his partner Jamie Bissonnette opened up a "global tapas" restaurant, called Little Donkey, in Cambridge, Massachusetts.

== Awards and honors ==
After nominations in 1998 and 1999, he won The James Beard Foundation's Best Chef — Northeast Award in 2001.

In 2002, he was one of People Magazine's Hottest Bachelors.

== Personal life ==
Married to wife Celine, he has two children.
