= Cassius Marcellus Clay Sr. =

American painter, father of Muhammad Ali

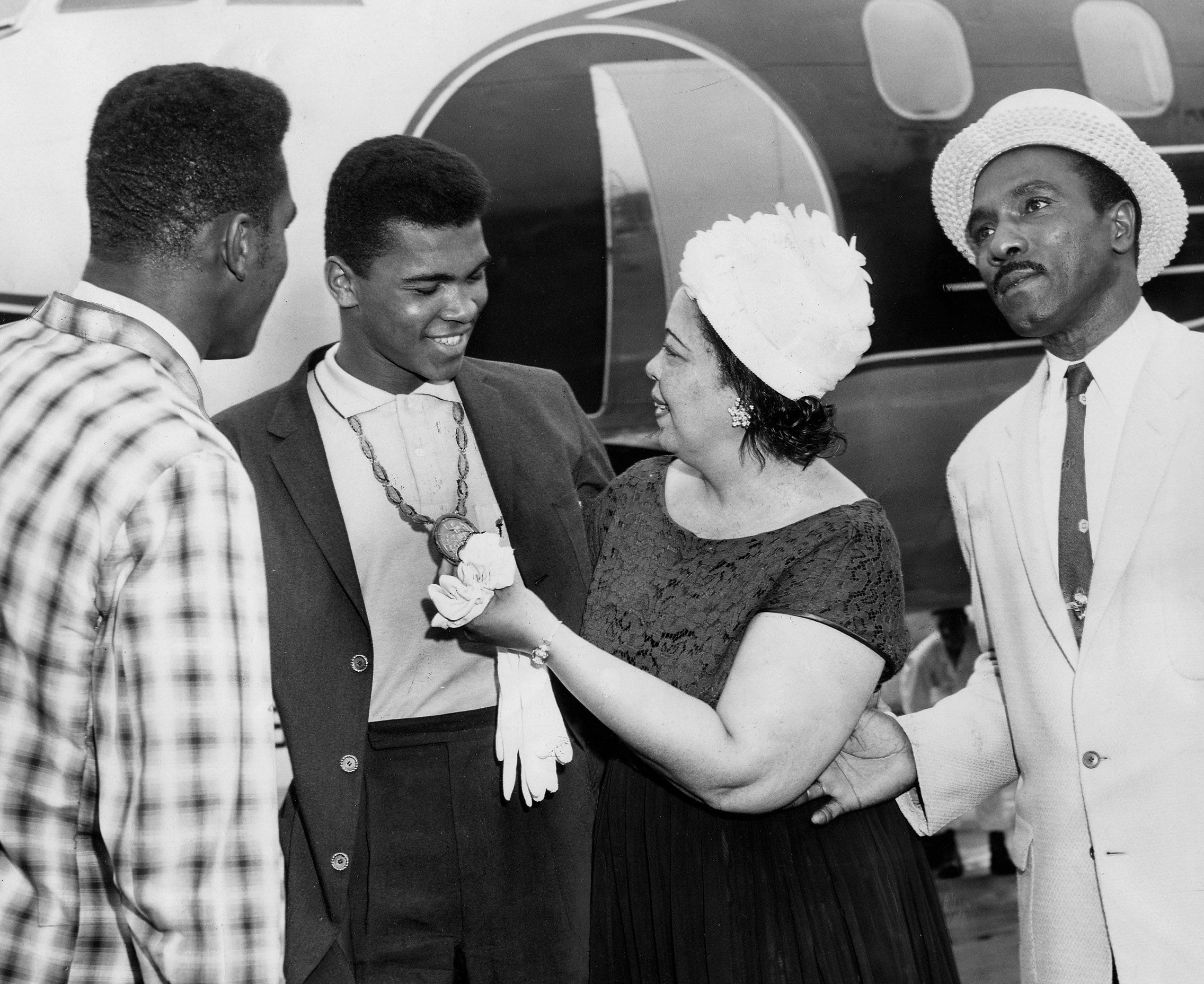
- Clay (right) with his wife and sons in 1960
- Born: Cassius Marcellus Clay; November 11, 1912; Jefferson County, Kentucky, U.S.
- Died: February 8, 1990 (aged 77); Louisville, Kentucky, U.S.
- Occupations: Painter, musician
- Spouse: Odessa Grady (m. 1934)
- Children: Muhammad; Rahaman

Cassius Marcellus "Cash" Clay Sr. (November 11, 1912 – February 8, 1990) was an American painter and musician. He was the father of three-time World Heavyweight Champion Muhammad Ali and Rahaman Ali, and the paternal grandfather of Laila Ali. He married Odessa Lee O'Grady in 1934 and worked as a painter. He was described as "a handsome, mercurial, noisy, combative failed dreamer" and a "hard-drinking, skirt-chasing dandy of a daddy". His son Muhammad Ali described him as "the fanciest dancer in Louisville".

== Life and career ==
Clay was born in Jefferson County, Kentucky, to Herman H. Clay (March 1876 – February 1, 1954) and Edith E. Greathouse (December 1889 – December 30, 1972). He was named in honor of the 19th-century Kentucky-born Republican politician and staunch abolitionist Cassius Marcellus Clay. He had a sister and four brothers, including Nathaniel Clay. Clay's paternal grandparents were John Clay and Sallie Anne Clay. His sister Eva said that Sallie was a native of Madagascar. According to DNA research, Muhammad Ali's paternal grandmother was Archer Alexander's (1816–1880) great-granddaughter.

Clay painted billboards and signs. He also played the piano, took piano lessons and wrote music. Around 1933, he married Odessa Lee O'Grady. He was a heavy drinker, which led to legal entanglements for reckless driving, disorderly conduct, and assault and battery. When asked in 1970 why he had not become a Muslim as his son had done, he said: "my religion is my talent, that which supports me."

Clay died at the age of 77 on February 8, 1990, after suffering a heart attack while leaving a department store in Kentucky.

== Legacy ==
Clay was portrayed by Arthur Adams in the 1977 film The Greatest, Giancarlo Esposito in the 2001 Oscar-nominated film Ali, and Omari Hardwick in the Prime Video television series The Greatest.
