= Felicia D. Henderson =

American screenwriter

- Born: April 18, 1961 (age 64)
- Education: UCLA (B.A., MFA); University of Georgia (MBA)
- Occupations: Film and television producer, director, and writer
- Years active: 1994–present

Felicia D. Henderson (born April 18, 1961) is an American television producer, screenwriter, comic books writer and a director of music videos and television episodes. She has worked on Moesha, Sister, Sister, Soul Food, and Fringe, also played in a movie with Whitney Houston.

== Personal life ==
Henderson was born on April 18, 1961. She grew up in Pasadena, California, where she currently resides. She is one of eight siblings, including a brother who works as a reality show editor. Henderson currently resides in Pasadena, California. She has always had a love for writing and describes herself as a "researchaholic." After graduating from the University of California, Los Angeles with a Bachelor of Arts degree in Psycho-Biology, she spent five years in business, and later attended the University of Georgia where she obtained an MBA in corporate finance and non-profit management.

She also holds an MFA from UCLA (2004) and is a PhD Candidate in Media Studies, also at UCLA.

She is also a Diamond Life member of Delta Sigma Theta sorority, the Writers Guild of America, the Directors Guild of America, and the Television Academy of Arts and Sciences.

== Career ==
After working as a creative associate at NBC, Henderson realized she wanted to become a writer, and soon became an apprentice on the sitcom Family Matters, and on The Fresh Prince of Bel-Air two years later. She co-produced Moesha and Sister, Sister, and developed the TV series Soul Food for television. It became the longest running drama in television history to star a black cast, and earned several NAACP Image Awards.

She and three of her friends, Mara Brock Akil, Gina Prince-Bythewood, and Sara Finney-Johnson endowed the Four Sisters Scholarship in Screenwriting, Directing, and Animation to support students interested in projects depicting the African American experience. She is currently a PhD candidate in the school's Cinema and Media Studies program.

Henderson worked as a co-executive producer for the teen drama series Gossip Girl. She also served as a co-executive producer on the first season of the science-fiction television series Fringe, before leaving to begin as a writer on the DC Comics series Teen Titans, Static Shock, as well as other projects.

Her television drama credits include "Marvel's The Punisher" and "The Quad."

== Filmography ==
- Family Matters, writer and story editor (1994–1996)
- The Fresh Prince of Bel-Air, writer (1995)
- Moesha, writer and co-producer (1996–1997)
- Sister, Sister, writer, co-executive producer, and supervising producer (1997–1998)
- Movie Stars, writer and consulting producer (2000)
- Soul Food, creator, writer, director and executive producer (2000–2003)
- Everybody Hates Chris, writer and consulting producer (2006)
- Gossip Girl, writer and co-executive producer (2007–2008)
- Fringe, writer and co-executive producer (2008–2009)
- Reed Between the Lines, writer and executive producer (2012–2013)
- The Quad, co-creator, executive producer (2016–2018)
- Marvel's The Punisher, writer and co-executive producer (2017–2018)
- First Kill, showrunner, executive producer (2022)

== Sources ==
- "Felicia D. Henderson". UCLA School of Theater, Film, and Television. Archived from the original on 31 March 2017.
