= Marc Rosen =

American film producer

- Born: May 12, 1976 (age 50); St. Louis, Missouri, US
- Education: The Bishop's School; Princeton University
- Occupations: Film and television producer
- Years active: 1998–present

Marc Rosen (born May 12, 1976) is an American film and television producer. He has been an executive and producer in film and television at major studios/networks as well as independent companies for 20 years. With the recent 2-hour finale of the Wachowski's SENSE8 on Netflix, Rosen has produced or executive produced over 50 hours of film and high-end ($3–$8mn/episode) Scripted Series including THRESHOLD with David Goyer and David Heyman, SENSE8, one of streaming's first original series, with the Wachowskis, and THE AFTER with Chris Carter as one of Amazon's first pilots and series orders.

== Early life ==
Before beginning his film career in 1998, Rosen worked on the staff of Senator Dianne Feinstein. In 1994, he graduated from The Bishop's School in La Jolla, California. In 1998, he graduated with honors from Princeton University with a B.A. in English literature and drama, with a minor in French. He continues to be an annual guest lecturer at Princeton University, with his "Hollywood 101" series of talks.

== Career ==
From 2012 to 2015, Rosen was the co-founder and CEO of Georgeville Television with Reliance Entertainment – the proprietors of DreamWorks. During GVTV's run, Rosen set up several projects, including Limitless, The After, From Dusk til Dawn, and Zorro.

Prior to GVTV, he had exclusive producing deals in film and television – with Paramount Film and CBS TV respectively – through his Rosenobst Productions, with Lynda Obst from 2007 to 2009. During that time, Rosen set up 20 series though the CBS deal.

Leading up to those deals, from 2001 to 2007, Rosen was a senior executive and founded and ran the Warner Brothers offices of Heyday Films/David Heyman. During his tenure, he set up feature films with Christopher Nolan, David Goyer, and founded the company's television division – Heyday Television, based at Warner Brothers – on the heels of his series Threshold for CBS.

Rosen has been under exclusive production deals with Warner Brothers (Time Warner), CBS (Viacom), Paramount (Viacom), and 20th Century Fox (Newscorp). He has been represented by Creative Artists Agency and William Morris Endeavor.

Rosen is managed by Anonymous Content as an executive producer, creator, and writer.
