= A. Kitman Ho =

American film producer

- Born: Alexander Kitman Ho; 1950 (age 75–76); Hong Kong
- Occupation: film producer

Alexander Kitman Ho (Chinese: 何傑民; Jyutping: ho4 git6 man4; born 1950), known as A. Kitman Ho, is an American film producer.

He was born in Hong Kong, and emigrated with his family to the United States when he was 5 years old. He grew up in New York City's Chinatown neighborhood. After graduating from Goddard College in Vermont with a master's degree in Cinema. He continued his studies at New York University's Tisch School of the Arts.

Ho has produced many of Oliver Stone's films, such as Platoon, Wall Street, Talk Radio, Born on the Fourth of July, The Doors, JFK, and Heaven & Earth.

== Filmography ==
He was a producer in all films unless otherwise noted.

=== Film ===
Year	Film	Credit
1981	The Loveless	
1984	Too Scared to Scream	Associate producer
1986	Platoon	Co-producer
1987	Wall Street	Co-producer
1988	Talk Radio	
1989	Born on the Fourth of July	
1991	The Doors	
1991	JFK	
1993	Heaven & Earth	
1994	On Deadly Ground	
1996	The Ghost and the Darkness	
1999	Brokedown Palace	Executive producer
2000	The Weight of Water	
2001	Ali	
2004	Hotel Rwanda	
2007	Reservation Road	

Production manager

Year	Film	Role
1979	Heartland	Production manager
1980	One-Trick Pony	Unit manager
1981	Reds	Production manager: New York / Washington
1982	My Favorite Year	Unit production manager: New York
1983	The Hunger	Production manager: New York unit
1986	Off Beat	Production manager
1999	Brokedown Palace	Unit production manager
2004	Hotel Rwanda	Unit production manager

Second unit director

- Hotel Rwanda (2004)
- Reservation Road (2007)

Location management

- The Warriors (1979)
- The First Deadly Sin (1980)

Thanks

- Thirteen Conversations About One Thing (2001)

=== Television ===
Production manager

Year	Title	Role	Notes
1983	Chiefs	Production manager	
1985	Out of the Darkness	Production manager	Television film
