= Khalilah Ali =

Former wife of boxer Muhammad Ali

Khalilah Camacho-Ali
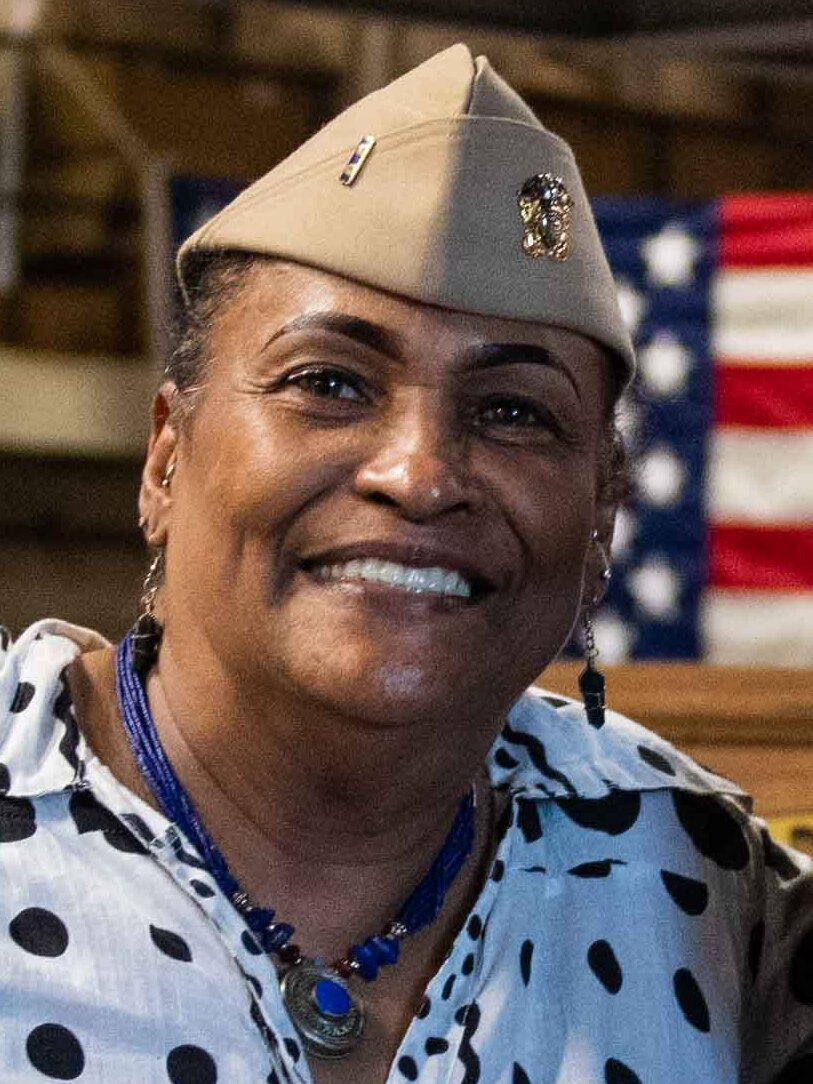
- Ali, 2024.
- Born: Belinda Tolona Boyd; March 17, 1950 (age 76); Chicago, Illinois, U.S.
- Occupations: Humanitarian; author; actress
- Spouses: Muhammad Ali (m. 1967; div. 1976) Rene Gonzalez Camacho (m. 1989; div. 1993)
- Children: 7 (1 stillborn)

Khalilah Camacho-Ali (born Belinda Tolona Boyd; March 17, 1950) is an American humanitarian, author and actress. She is best known for being the second wife of boxer Muhammad Ali. They were married from 1967 until 1976.

== Personal life ==
=== Early life and background ===
Belinda Tolona Boyd was born on March 17, 1950, and raised in Chicago within the Nation of Islam (NOI) community. Her father, Brother Raymond Boyd (Sada), served as a prominent lieutenant under Elijah Muhammad, and her mother, Sister Inez Boyd (Aminah), worked within the temple as a security officer and companion to Sister Clara Muhammad, the NOI First Lady. Due to her parents' roles, Boyd grew up with close ties to NOI leadership, adhering to NOI teachings on lifestyle, including abstaining from social activities before marriage.

Although women in the Nation of Islam were often expected to remain silent, Boyd was part of a group of prominent women who navigated both social expectations and religious teachings within the organization. Scholars note that women like Boyd played nuanced roles by guiding their husbands and contributing to community success while negotiating with traditional expectations.

=== Marriage to Muhammad Ali ===
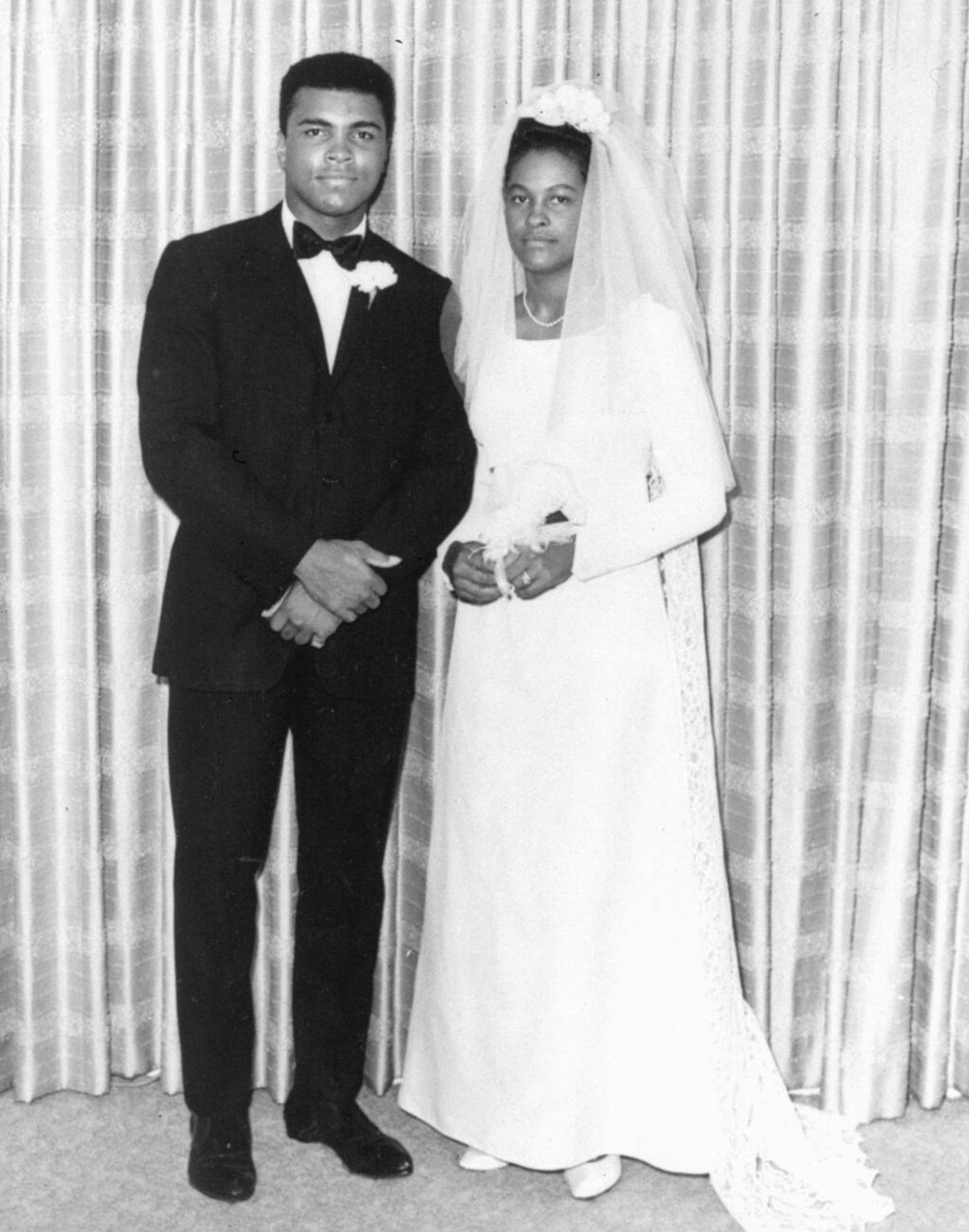
Ali and Boyd after their wedding at her family's Chicago home, August 1967.

At the age of 17, Boyd married Muhammad Ali on August 18, 1967, in a marriage she claims was arranged by her Muslim parents. In an interview with NBC 6, Boyd recounted meeting Ali when she was 10 years old at her hometown mosque. Boyd stated Ali signed an autograph for her while humorously remarking on his future fame, “He said, ‘listen here little girl. This is my name. Imma be famous. You need to keep that 'cause it's gone be worth a lot of money,’” Boyd said. After marrying, Boyd adopted the name Khalilah Ali, though friends and family continued to call her Belinda. During Ali's draft evasion case in 1967, which led to the temporary revocation of his boxing title, Khalilah supported him emotionally and financially.

Boyd and Ali's marriage faced difficulties, notably due to Ali's infidelities. In 1974, Ali began an affair with Veronica Porché after the Rumble in the Jungle, leading to a confrontation between Khalilah and Porché in Manila during the Thrilla in Manila fight. In January 1977, Khalilah filed for divorce, citing differences in morals and respect within the family. She later remarked, "I left him because he wasn't what he said he was, because of his lack of morals and disrespect to the family. I don’t think he deserves the name Muhammad Ali, and I’m going to call him Cassius Clay from now on."

=== Children and family ===
Boyd and Ali had five children: Maryum "May May" (b. 1968), Muhammad Ali Jr. (born & died 1969), twins Jamillah and Rasheda (b. 1970), and Muhammad Ali Jr. (b. 1972). During their marriage, Ali also fathered other children through extramarital relationships, including Miya (b. 1972) and Khaliah (b. 1974). Rasheda later married Robert Walsh, with whom she has two sons: Biaggio Ali Walsh (b. 1998) and Nico Ali Walsh (b. 2000), both of whom have maintained a public presence. Khalilah also had two more children with her fourth husband, Rene Gonzalez Camacho: Aminah Rene (b. 1989) and Khalilah II (b. 1991).

=== Subsequent marriages ===
Following her divorce from Ali, Khalilah remarried in the 1980s and experienced two additional divorces.

== Political views ==
In 2024, Khalilah Ali publicly endorsed Donald Trump in that year's presidential election. She expressed her decision, stating, "I'm voting for Trump, I don’t care what nobody believes, I don’t care what nobody says, I don’t care what you think, whatever. I’ve studied what Trump wants to do. I’ve studied what Trump wants to make change. I saw what Trump has tried to do. And people who just want to be a hater, they don’t get information. I wear my Trump hat every day. I don’t care about what you think. Half my family are Democrats. Do I care? No. But we still family."

== Career ==
She studied karate, and by 1977, earned a third degree black belt. Khalilah studied under Jim Kelly and Steve Saunders. She eventually earned her ninth degree black belt.

She appeared on the cover of Ebony Magazine seven times. She appeared in the Jane Fonda film The China Syndrome.
