= Aaron Meeks =

American actor (born 1986)

- Born: Aaron Joseph Weeks; April 26, 1986 (age 39); Watts, Los Angeles, California, United States
- Occupation: Actor
- Years active: 1999−2007

Aaron Joseph Meeks (born April 26, 1986) is an American former actor. He is best known for his role as Ahmad Chadway on the Showtime family drama series Soul Food (2000−04). During his career, Meeks was awarded two NAACP Image Awards and received three Young Artist Award nominations.

== Career ==
Meeks started acting in childhood as a member of the Cornerstone Theater Company troupe. His brother, Andrew, was also a child actor. Aaron made his screen debut in 1999 on the medical drama Diagnosis: Murder, playing an abused young boy. In 2000, Meeks appeared as Herman D. Washington in the Showtime movie A Storm in Summer, starring opposite Peter Falk. Their characters form an unlikely friendship. One reviewer found Meeks' performance "impressive." He earned a Young Artist Award nomination in 2001 for his work in this film. Meeks portrayed a young Cassius Clay in Ali: An American Hero (2000) and acted in the Gregory Hines television film Bojangles (2001).

Meeks portrayed the role of Ahmad Chadway, a teenager who attends prep school, on drama series Soul Food. He also narrated the series as Ahmad. Meeks played the role from 2000 to 2004. For playing Ahmad, he won two consecutive NAACP Image Awards for Outstanding Youth Actor in 2001 and 2002. In 2003, he received an NAACP Image Award nomination in the category of Outstanding Supporting Actor in a Drama Series. Additionally, Meeks was given two Young Artist Award nominations in 2003 and 2004 for his performance on Soul Food.

Following his work on Soul Food, he appeared in the television film Redemption: The Stan Tookie Williams Story (2004) and had a guest role on crime drama Crossing Jordan (2007). Meeks has not acted since 2007.

== Filmography ==
=== Film ===
Year	Film	Role	Notes
2000	A Storm in Summer	Herman D. Washington	TV film
2000	Ali: An American Hero	Young Cassius Clay	TV film
2001	Bojangles	William (Young Percy)	TV film
2004	Redemption: The Stan Tookie Williams Story	Banger #1	TV film
2007	Foster Babies	Willie Jr.	Direct-to-Video
2007	Frankie D	Tyrone	

=== Television ===
Year	Series	Role	Notes
1999	Diagnosis: Murder	Dion	3 episodes
2000	The Pretender	Kevin	Episode: "School Daze"
2000−2004	Soul Food	Ahmad Chadway	Series regular, 74 episodes
2007	Crossing Jordan	Young Man	Episode: "33 Bullets"

== Awards and nominations ==
Year	Award	Category	Work	Result
2001	NAACP Image Awards	Outstanding Youth Actor/Actress	Soul Food	Won
2001	Young Artist Awards	Best Performance in a TV Movie (Drama): Leading Young Actor	A Storm in Summer	Nominated
2002	NAACP Image Awards	Outstanding Youth Actor/Actress	Soul Food	Won
2003	Young Artist Awards	Best Performance in a TV Series (Comedy or Drama) - Supporting Young Actor	Soul Food	Nominated
2003	NAACP Image Awards	Outstanding Supporting Actor in a Drama Series	Soul Food	Nominated
2004	Young Artist Awards	Best Performance in a TV Series (Comedy or Drama) - Supporting Young Actor	Soul Food	Nominated
