= Luis Sarria =

Luis Sarria (1911–1991) was a Cuban-American boxer who went on to become a trainer, masseur, and cutman. He was born on October 29, 1911, in Cumanayagua, Cuba, and died on November 19, 1991. He was posthumously inducted into the Florida Boxing Hall of Fame in 2013.

== Career ==
Sarria was a member of Muhammad Ali's entourage for almost the entire duration of Ali's career. Prior to working with Ali, Sarria had worked with several prominent boxers including Luis Manuel Rodríguez, Florentino Fernández, Angel Robinson Garcia, and almost all boxers trained by Angelo Dundee up till then.

Ferdie Pacheco called Sarria "the dean of masseurs", and a "guru of fitness." According to Pacheco, Ali had handed over his body, and consequently his health and career, to Sarria. In an interview with Sports Illustrated, Angelo Dundee expressed his appreciation for Sarria's professional competence which, according to Dundee, resulted in enhancing Ali's physical fitness and "added years to Ali's boxing life." According to Gary Smith, it was widely believed that Sarria's fingers were able to dissolve fat on Ali's body.

Commenting on the times when he was a part of Ali's entourage, Sarria had observed:

The Ali years were unbelievable. I worked with him for all but two of his title fights. I was there from beginning to end. Ali treated me well. He gave me a down payment for my house and paid me a good salary, but many people around him were leeches. Angelo and the sparring partners earned their money but there were many in the camp that earned high salaries and did absolutely nothing…Few cared for him as a human being.
