= Rahaman Ali =

American boxer (1943–2025)

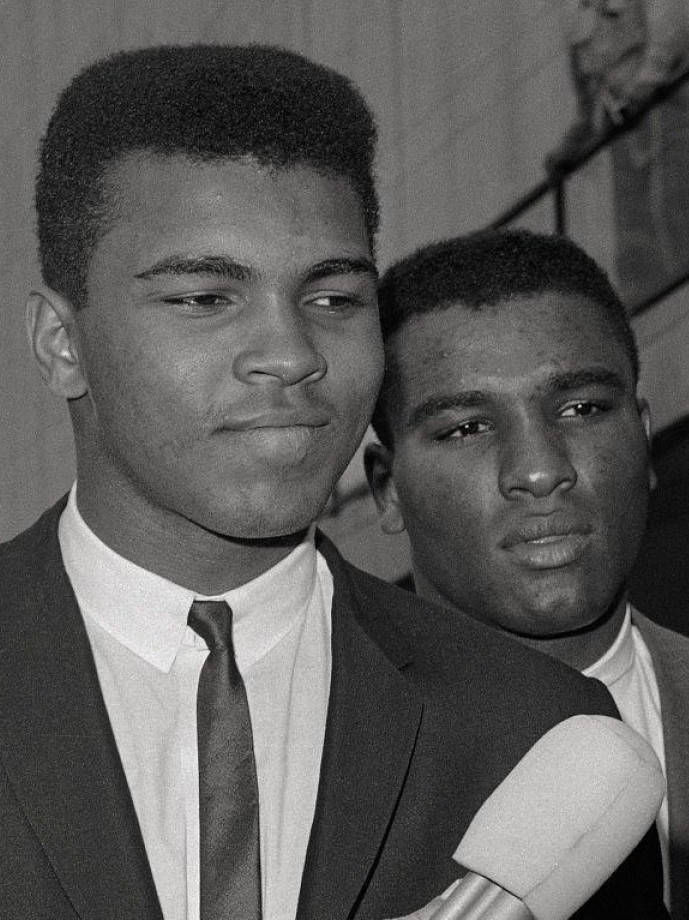
- Rahaman Ali (right) next to his brother Muhammad Ali in 1964

Personal information
- Nationality: American
- Born: Rudolph Arnett Clay; July 18, 1943 Louisville, Kentucky, U.S.
- Died: August 1, 2025 (aged 82) Louisville, Kentucky, U.S.
- Resting place: Cave Hill Cemetery, Louisville Kentucky
- Height: 6 ft 4 in (193 cm)
- Weight: Heavyweight
- Parents: Cassius Marcellus Clay Sr. (father); Odessa Grady Clay (mother)
- Relative: Muhammad Ali (brother)

Boxing career
- Stance: Orthodox

Boxing record
- Total fights: 18
- Wins: 14
- Win by KO: 7
- Losses: 3
- Draws: 1
- No contests: 0

Rahaman Ali (Note: alternately spelled Rahman in some media, but Ali spells his name as Rahaman in his autobiography as well as his biography of his brother Muhammad; various other sources spell it either way) (born Rudolph Arnett Clay; July 18, 1943 – August 1, 2025) was an American heavyweight boxer. He was the younger brother of Muhammad Ali.

== Biography ==
Rahaman Ali was born Rudolph Arnett Clay to Cassius Marcellus Clay Sr. and Odessa Grady Clay in Louisville, Kentucky on July 18, 1943. He was soon renamed Rudolph Valentino Clay, after his father's favorite actor Rudolph Valentino. He was 18 months younger than his brother Cassius Jr., who would become Muhammad Ali. Muhammad started boxing in a Louisville amateur boxing league. While Muhammad went to the 1960 Olympics, Rahaman was not selected and remained amateur until February 25, 1964, the night his brother won his first world heavyweight title over Sonny Liston.

His professional career would last from 1964 to 1972. As a professional boxer, Rahaman Ali won 14 bouts, lost 3, and had one draw. In his career, he knocked out seven opponents and was himself knocked out once. He retired from professional boxing after back-to-back losses, the second of which saw him being knocked out by future Superman film series actor Jack O'Halloran in what would also be his only stoppage defeat.

After his career ended, Rahaman would travel and also train with Muhammad. He would later appear as himself in his brother's 1977 biopic The Greatest.

In 2014, Ali released his autobiography, That's Muhammad Ali's Brother! My Life on the Undercard, which was co-authored by H. Ron Brashear and the foreword written by Gene Kilroy, the longtime business manager of Muhammad Ali. In 2019, Rahaman released his second book titled My Brother, Muhammad Ali - The Definitive Biography. It was co-authored by Fiaz Rafiq, with the foreword written by NFL legend Jim Brown. In 2021, he appeared in the documentary Blood Brothers: Malcolm X & Muhammad Ali. The same year, he appeared in three episodes of his brother's documentary miniseries Muhammad Ali.

Rahaman Ali died on August 1, 2025, two weeks after his 82nd birthday. Ali's funeral was held on August 16, 2025, and involved a funeral procession where he made a stop at his childhood home before he had a Janazah funeral service, which is given for people of Muslim faith, at the Cave Hill Cemetery in Louisville, Kentucky. Ali is buried at the Cave Hill Cemetery.

== Professional boxing record ==
14 wins (7 knockouts, 7 decisions), 3 losses (1 knockout, 2 decisions), 1 draw
Result	Record	Opponent	Type	Round	Date	Location
Loss	14–3–1	Jack O'Halloran	KO	8	1972-09-13	San Diego, California
Loss	14–2–1	Roy Wallace	PTS	10	1972-05-08	Niles, Ohio
Draw	14–1–1	Jasper Evans	PTS	10	1972-01-22	Denver, Colorado
Win	14–1	Joe Byrd	TKO	4	1971-12-16	Kalamazoo, Michigan
Win	13–1	Harold Carter	TKO	3	1971-10-27	O'Hare Port Hotel, Chicago, Illinois
Win	12–1	Larry Beilfuss	TKO	2	1971-09-13	Milwaukee Auditorium, Milwaukee, Wisconsin
Win	11–1	Carl Baker	MD	10	1971-04-30	Port of Spain
Win	10–1	Peter Robinson	TKO	2	1971-04-23	Port of Spain
Win	9–1	Stamford Harris	PTS	10	1971-04-16	Port of Spain
Win	8–1	Clement Greenidge	PTS	10	1971-04-09	Port of Spain
Loss	7–1	Danny McAlinden	PTS	6	1971-03-08	Madison Square Garden, New York City
Win	7–0	Howard Darlington	PTS	4	1970-12-07	Madison Square Garden, New York City
Win	6–0	Hurricane Grant	KO	3	1970-10-26	Atlanta City Auditorium, Atlanta, Georgia
Win	5–0	Tommy Howard	UD	10	1970-08-11	Miami Beach Auditorium, Miami Beach, Florida
Win	4–0	Fairchild Hope	TKO	2	1966-02-11	Nassau
Win	3–0	Buster Reed	KO	2	1965-05-25	St. Dominic's Hall, Lewiston, Maine
Win	2–0	Levi Forte	UD	10	1965-04-28	Miami Beach Auditorium, Miami Beach, Florida
Win	1–0	Chip Johnson	PTS	4	1964-02-25	Miami Beach Auditorium, Miami Beach, Florida

== Exhibition boxing record ==
1 fight	0 wins	0 losses
Non-scored	1	

No.	Result	Record	Opponent	Type	Round, time	Date	Location	Notes
1	—N/a	0–0 (1)	Muhammad Ali	—N/a	2	Jul 1, 1972	Los Angeles, California, U.S.	Non-scored bout
