= Forest Whitaker filmography =

List of films

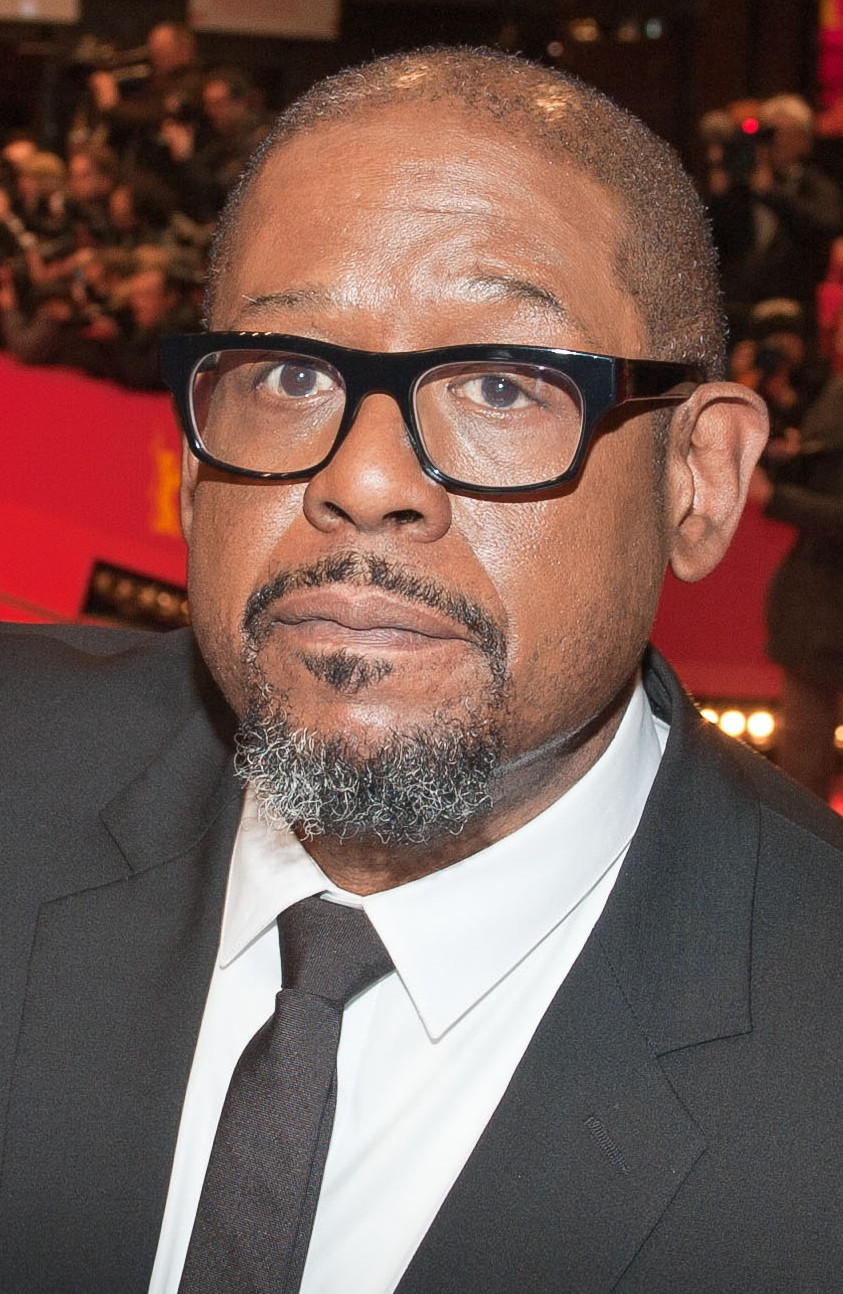
Forest Whitaker in 2014

Forest Whitaker is an American actor, filmmaker, and activist.

Whitaker started his career in early roles in films such as Fast Times at Ridgemont High (1982), Vision Quest (1985), The Color of Money (1986), Platoon (1986), Good Morning, Vietnam (1987) before his leading role in Clint Eastwood's Bird (1988). Whitaker continued acting in films such as The Crying Game (1992), Blown Away (1994), Prêt-à-Porter (1994), Mr. Holland's Opus (1995), Ghost Dog: The Way of the Samurai (1999), and Panic Room (2002) He won the Academy Award for Best Actor for his role in The Last King of Scotland (2006). He has since acted in The Great Debaters (2007), Vantage Point (2008), Lee Daniels' The Butler (2013), Arrival (2016), Rogue One: A Star Wars Story (2016), The Forgiven (2017), and Black Panther (2018).

Whitaker made his television debut in the CBS sitcom Making the Grade (1982). He has since had roles as Curtis Ames in the NBC medical drama ER (2006–2007), Lt. Jon Kavanaugh in FX crime drama The Shield (2006–2007), and Sam Cooper in the CBS police drama Criminal Minds: Suspect Behavior (2011). Whitaker's recent roles include Eddie Barker in the Fox musical drama series Empire (2017–2018) and Bumpy Johnson in the Epix crime drama Godfather of Harlem (2019–present). He made his Broadway debut in the revival of Eugene O'Neill's play Hughie (2016).

== Film ==
=== Actor ===
Year	Title	Role	Notes	Ref.
1982	Tag: The Assassination Game	Gowdy's Bodyguard		
1982	Fast Times at Ridgemont High	Charles Jefferson		
1985	Vision Quest	Jean-Pierre "Balldozer" Baldosier		
1986	The Color of Money	Amos		
1986	Platoon	Harold "Big Harold"		
1987	Stakeout	Detective Jack Pismo		
1987	Good Morning, Vietnam	Private Edward Garlick		
1988	Bloodsport	CID Agent Rawlins		
1988	Bird	Charlie "Bird" Parker, Jr.		
1989	Johnny Handsome	Dr. Steven Fisher		
1990	Downtown	Dennis Curren		
1991	Diary of a Hitman	Dekker		
1991	A Rage in Harlem	Jackson	Also co-producer	
1992	Article 99	Dr. Sid Handleman		
1992	The Crying Game	Jody		
1992	Consenting Adults	David Duttonville		
1993	Bank Robber	Officer Battle		
1993	Body Snatchers	Major Matthew Collins		
1994	Blown Away	Officer Anthony Franklin		
1994	Prêt-à-Porter	Cy Bianco		
1994	Jason's Lyric	"Maddog"		
1995	Species	Dan Smithson		
1995	Smoke	Cyrus Cole		
1995	Mr. Holland's Opus	Adult Bobby Tidd	Uncredited	
1996	Phenomenon	Nate Pope		
1998	Body Count	Crane		
1999	Ghost Dog: The Way of the Samurai	"Ghost Dog"		
1999	Light It Up	Officer Dante Jackson		
2000	Battlefield Earth	Ker		
2000	Four Dogs Playing Poker	Mr. Ellington		
2001	The Fourth Angel	FBI Agent Jules Bernard		
2001	Jew Balloons	Jeremiah Shultze	Short film	
2001	The Hire: The Follow	The Employer	Short film; uncredited	
2001	Green Dragon	Addie	Also executive producer	
2002	Panic Room	Burnham		
2002	Phone Booth	Captain Ed Ramey		
2004	Jiminy Glick in Lalawood	Himself		
2004	First Daughter	Narrator	Also director and executive producer	
2005	A Little Trip to Heaven	Abe Holt		
2005	American Gun	Carter	Also executive producer	
2005	Mary	Ted Younger		
2006	Even Money	Clyde Snow		
2006	The Marsh	Geoffrey Hunt		
2006	Everyone's Hero	Lonnie Brewster	Voice role	
2006	The Last King of Scotland	Idi Amin		
2007	The Air I Breathe	Happiness		
2007	Ripple Effect	Philip	Also executive producer	
2007	The Great Debaters	James L. Farmer, Sr.		
2008	Vantage Point	Howard Lewis		
2008	Street Kings	Captain Jack Wander		
2008	Dragon Hunters	Lian Chu	Voice role; English-language version	
2008	Winged Creatures	Charlie Archenault		
2009	Powder Blue	Charlie	Also producer	
2009	Where the Wild Things Are	Ira	Voice role	
2009	Hurricane Season	Al Collins	Direct-to-video	
2010	Repo Men	Jake Freivald		
2010	Lullaby for Pi	George		
2010	My Own Love Song	Joey		
2010	The Experiment	Barris	Direct-to-video	
2010	Our Family Wedding	Bradford Boyd		
2011	Catch .44	Ronny	Direct-to-video	
2012	Freelancers	Dennis LaRue	Direct-to-video	
2012	A Dark Truth	Francisco Francis		
2012	Ernest & Celestine	Ernest	Voice role; English-language version	
2013	The Last Stand	FBI Agent John Bannister		
2013	Repentance	Angel Sanchez	Also producer	
2013	Zulu	Ali Sokhela		
2013	Pawn	Will	Direct-to-video	
2013	Lee Daniels' The Butler	Cecil Gaines		
2013	Black Nativity	Reverend Cornell		
2013	Out of the Furnace	Chief Wesley Barnes		
2014	Two Men in Town	William Garnett		
2014	Taken 3	Inspector Frank Dotzler		
2015	Dope	Narrator	Also producer	
2015	Southpaw	Titus "Tick" Wills		
2016	Arrival	Colonel Weber		
2016	Rogue One: A Star Wars Story	Saw Gerrera		
2017	The Forgiven	Archbishop Desmond Tutu		
2018	Sorry to Bother You	First Equisapien / Demarius	Also producer	
2018	Burden	Reverend David Kennedy		
2018	Black Panther	Zuri		
2018	How It Ends	Tom		
2018	City of Lies	Jack Jackson		
2019	Finding Steve McQueen	Howard Lambert		
2020	Jingle Jangle: A Christmas Journey	Jeronicus Jangle		
2021	Respect	C. L. Franklin		
2023	Big George Foreman	Doc Broadus		
2025	The King of Kings	Peter	Voice role	
2025	Havoc	Lawrence Beaumont		
2026	Up Against It	TBA		

=== Filmmaker ===
Year	Title	Director	Producer
1995	Waiting to Exhale	Yes	No
1998	Hope Floats	Yes	No
2003	Chasing Papi	No	Yes
2004	First Daughter	Yes	Executive
2009	Powder Blue	No	Yes
2013	Fruitvale Station	No	Yes
2013	Repentance	No	Yes
2015	Dope	No	Yes
2016	Songs My Brothers Taught Me	No	Yes
2017	Roxanne Roxanne	No	Yes
2018	Sorry to Bother You	No	Yes
2021	Passing	No	Yes
2023	To Live and Die and Live	No	Yes
2025	Lucky Lu	No	Executive

== Television ==
Year	Title	Role	Notes
1982	Making the Grade	Unknown role	Episode: "Marriage David Style"
1983	Cagney & Lacey	Night Manager	Episode: "The Grandest Jewel Thief of Them All"
1984	Trapper John, M.D.	Lewis Jordan	Episode: "School Nurse"
1984	Hill Street Blues	Floyd Green	Episode: "Blues for Mr. Green"
1985	Diff'rent Strokes	Herman	Episode: "Bully for Arnold"
1985	The Grand Baby	Unknown role	Television film
1985	The Fall Guy	Friend	Episode: "Spring Break"
1985	North and South	Cuffey	Miniseries
1986	Amazing Stories	Jerry	Episode: "Gather Ye Acorns"
1986	North and South, Book II	Cuffey	Miniseries
1987	Hands of a Stranger	Sergeant Delaney	Television film
1990	Criminal Justice	Jessie Williams	Television film
1993	Lush Life	Buddy Chester	Television film
1993	Strapped	—N/a	Television film; director
1993	Last Light	Fred Whitmore	Television film
1994	The Enemy Within	Colonel MacKenzie "Mac" Casey	Television film
1996	Rebound: The Legend of Earl "The Goat" Manigault	Mr. Rucker	Television film
1999	Witness Protection	US Marshal Steve Beck	Television film
2001	Feast of All Saints	Daguerreotypist Picard	Television film; also executive producer
2002	Door to Door	—N/a	Television film; co-executive producer
2002–2003	The Twilight Zone	Host / Narrator	44 episodes; also consulting producer
2003	Deacons for Defense	Marcus Clay	Television film
2006–2007	ER	Curtis Ames	6 episodes
2006–2007	The Shield	Lieutenant Jon Kavanaugh	13 episodes (seasons 5 and 6)
2007–2009	American Dad!	The Turlingtons	Voice role; 3 episodes
2010	Criminal Minds	Sam Cooper	Episode: "The Fight"
2010	Brick City	—N/a	11 episodes; executive producer
2011	Criminal Minds: Suspect Behavior	Sam Cooper	Lead role; 13 episodes
2012	Serving Life	Narrator	Documentary; also executive producer
2013	Africa	Narrator	Documentary series
2016	Roots	Henry (Fiddler)	3 episodes
2017	Star Wars Rebels	Saw Gerrera	Voice; 4 episodes
2017–2018	Empire	Eddie Barker	11 episodes
2019–present	Godfather of Harlem	Bumpy Johnson	40 episodes; also executive producer
2022	Young Rock	Himself	3 episodes
2022–2025	Andor	Saw Gerrera	5 episodes
2023	Extrapolations	August Bolo	Episode: "2068: The Going-Away Party"
2024	The Emperor of Ocean Park	Judge Oliver Garland	10 episodes
TBA	Gossamer	TBA	Voice role

== Theatre ==
Year	Title	Playwright	Role	Venue
2016	Hughie	Eugene O'Neill	Erie Smith	Booth Theatre, Broadway debut

== Video games ==
Year	Title	Voice role	Notes	Ref.
2019	Star Wars Jedi: Fallen Order	Saw Gerrera	Voice, likeness, and motion capture	
2023	Asgard's Wrath 2	Djehuty	Voice	

== Music videos ==
Year	Artist	Title	Notes	Ref.
1995	Whitney Houston	"Exhale (Shoop Shoop)"	Director	
2001	Jagged Edge	"Goodbye"	Director	
2009	Jamie Foxx ft. T-Pain	"Blame It"		
2019	Bring Me the Horizon	"In the Dark"		
