= List of awards and nominations received by Forest Whitaker =

Forest Whitaker awards and nominations
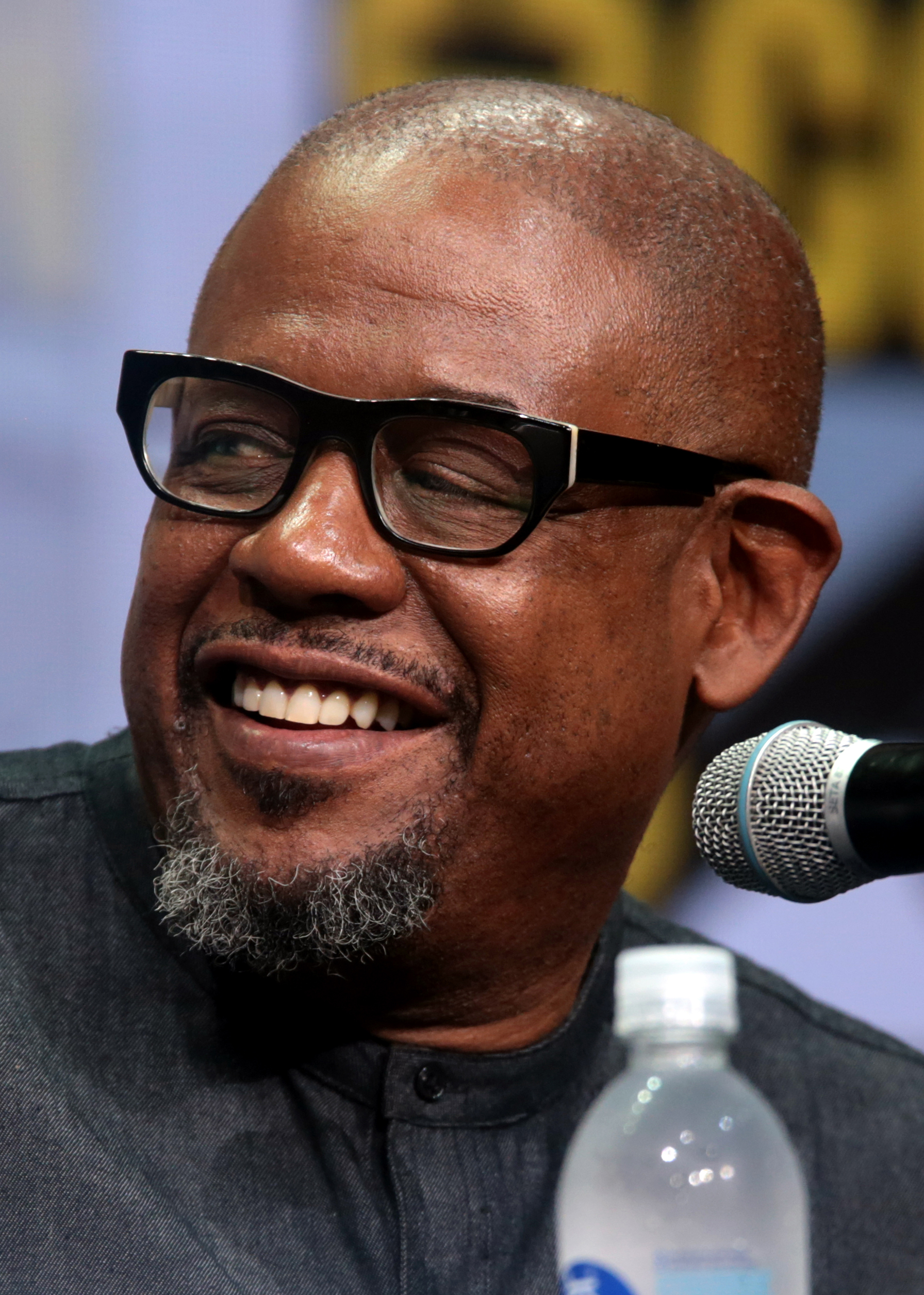
- Whitaker at the 2017 San Diego Comic-Con
Awards and nominations
Award	Wins	Nominations
Academy Awards	1	1
BAFTA Film Awards	1	1
Cannes Film Festival	1	1
Critics' Choice Awards	2	4
Golden Globe Awards	1	2
Emmy Awards	1	5
Satellite Awards	1	3
Screen Actors Guild Awards	2	6

Totals (Note: Certain award groups do not simply award one winner. They acknowledge several different recipients, have runners-up, and have third place. Since this is a specific recognition and is different from losing an award, runner-up mentions are considered wins in this award tally. For simplification and to avoid errors, each award in this list has been presumed to have had a prior nomination.)
- Wins: 59
- Nominations: 68

This is a list of awards and nominations received by American actor, filmmaker, and activist Forest Whitaker.

Over his career Whitaker has earned an Academy Award, BAFTA Award, Emmy Award, Golden Globe Award, a Cannes Film Festival Awards, and two Screen Actors Guild Awards. He won the Academy Award for Best Actor, BAFTA Award for Best Actor, Golden Globe Award for Best Actor - Motion Picture Drama, and Screen Actors Guild Award for Outstanding Performance by a Male Actor in a Leading Role for his portrayal of Ugandan dictator Idi Amin in The Last King of Scotland (2006). In 2022 he won the Honorary Palme d'Or.

== Major associations ==
=== Academy Awards ===
Year	Category	Nominated work	Result	Ref.
2007	Best Actor	The Last King of Scotland	Won	

=== BAFTA Awards ===
Year	Category	Nominated work	Result	Ref.
British Academy Film Awards
2006	Best Actor in a Leading Role	The Last King of Scotland	Won	

=== Cannes Film Festival ===
Year	Category	Nominated work	Result	Ref.
1988	Best Actor	Bird	Won	
2022	Honorary Palme d'Or		Won	

=== Critics' Choice Awards ===
Year	Category	Nominated work	Result	Ref.
Critics' Choice Movie Awards
2007	Best Actor	The Last King of Scotland	Won	
2014	Joel Siegel Award		Won	
2019	Best Acting Ensemble	Black Panther	Nominated	
Critics' Choice Television Award
2016	Best Supporting Actor in a Movie/Miniseries	Roots	Nominated	

=== Emmy Awards ===
Year	Category	Nominated work	Result	Ref.
Primetime Emmy Awards
2003	Outstanding Television Movie	Door to Door	Won	
2007	Outstanding Guest Actor in a Drama Series	ER	Nominated	
2010	Exceptional Merit in Nonfiction Filmmaking	Brick City	Nominated	
2025	Outstanding Guest Actor in a Drama Series	Andor (for "I Have Friends Everywhere")	Nominated	
News & Documentary Emmy Awards
2012	Outstanding Informational Programming – Long Form	Brick City	Nominated	

=== Golden Globes Awards ===
Year	Category	Nominated work	Result	Ref.
1988	Best Actor – Motion Picture Drama	Bird	Nominated	
2006	Best Actor – Motion Picture Drama	The Last King of Scotland	Won	

=== Independent Spirit Awards ===
Year	Category	Nominated work	Result	Ref.
2006	Best Male Lead Actor	American Gun	Nominated	
2014	Best First Feature	Fruitvale Station (as a producer)	Won	
2016	Best First Feature	Songs My Brother Taught Me (as a producer)	Nominated	
2019	Best First Feature	Sorry to Bother You (as a producer)	Won	

=== Screen Actors Guild Awards ===
Year	Category	Nominated work	Result	Ref.
1994	Outstanding Actor in a Miniseries or TV Movie	The Enemy Within	Nominated	
2003	Outstanding Actor in a Miniseries or TV Movie	Deacons for Defense and Justice	Nominated	
2006	Outstanding Actor in a Leading Role	The Last King of Scotland	Won	
2013	Outstanding Actor in a Leading Role	The Butler	Nominated	
2013	Outstanding Cast in a Motion Picture	The Butler	Nominated	
2018	Outstanding Cast in a Motion Picture	Black Panther	Won	

== Miscellaneous awards ==
=== AARP Movies for Grownups Awards ===
The AARP Movies for Grownups Awards are given annually by the AARP to encourage the film industry to make more movies by and about people over the age of 50.

Year	Work	Category	Result	Ref.
2013	The Butler	Best Actor	Nominated	
2013	The Butler	Best Grownup Love Story	Nominated	

=== Audie Awards ===
Year	Work	Category	Result	Ref.
2008	The Bible Experience (Old Testament)	Audiobook of the Year	Nominated	
2008	The Bible Experience (Old Testament)	Inspirational/Spiritual	Won	
2008	The Bible Experience (Old Testament)	Multi-Voiced Performance	Won	
2010	Nelson Mandela's Favorite African Folktales	Audiobook of the Year	Won	
2010	Nelson Mandela's Favorite African Folktales	Multi-Voiced Performance	Won	
2014	Nelson Mandela by Kadir Nelson	Children's Title for Ages Up to Eight	Nominated	

=== BET Awards ===
Year	Work	Category	Result	Ref.
2007	The Last King of Scotland	Best Actor	Won	
2014	The Butler	Best Actor	Nominated	
2020	Godfather of Harlem	Best Actor	Nominated	

=== Black Reel Awards ===
Year	Work	Category	Result	Ref.
2003	Panic Room	Outstanding Supporting Actor, Motion Picture	Nominated	
2004	Phone Booth	Outstanding Supporting Actor, Motion Picture	Nominated	
2004	Deacons for Defense	Outstanding Actor, TV Movie or Limited Series	Won	
2007	The Last King of Scotland	Outstanding Actor, Motion Picture	Won	
2010	Where the Wild Things Are	Outstanding Voice Performance	Won	
2014	Fruitvale Station (as a producer)	Outstanding Film	Nominated	
2014	The Butler	Outstanding Actor, Motion Picture	Nominated	
2016	Southpaw	Outstanding Supporting Actor, Motion Picture	Nominated	
2020	Godfather of Harlem (as a producer)	Outstanding Drama Series	Nominated	
2020	Godfather of Harlem (as a producer)	Outstanding Actor, Drama Series	Nominated	
2021	"Make It Work" (from Jingle Jangle: A Christmas Journey)	Outstanding Original Song	Nominated	
2022	Passing (as a producer)	Outstanding Film	Nominated	

=== British Independent Film Awards ===
The British Independent Film Awards (BIFA) is an organisation that celebrates, supports and promotes British independent cinema and filmmaking talent in United Kingdom, Australia and New Zealand.

Year	Work	Category	Result	Ref.
2006	The Last King of Scotland	Best Actor	Nominated	

=== Gotham Awards ===
The Gotham Awards is an awards show presented annually by the Gotham Film & Media Institute to honor independent films in cinematic achievement.

Year	Work	Category	Result	Ref.
2013	Fruitvale Station (as a producer)	Audience Award	Nominated	
2013	Himself	Gotham Tributes Honor	Won	
2018	Sorry to Bother You (as a producer)	Audience Award	Nominated	
2021	Passing (as a producer)	Best Feature	Nominated	

=== Guild of Music Supervisors Awards ===
Year	Work	Category	Result	Ref.
2021	"Make It Work" (from Jingle Jangle: A Christmas Journey)	Best Song Written and/or Recorded for a Film	Nominated	

=== NAACP Image Awards ===
The NAACP Image Awards NAACP Image Awards is an annual awards ceremony presented by the U.S.-based National Association for the Advancement of Colored People to honor outstanding performances in film, television, theatre, music, and literature.

Year	Work	Category	Result	Ref.
1995	The Crying Game	Outstanding Supporting Actor in a Motion Picture	Nominated	
1997	Phenomenon	Outstanding Supporting Actor in a Motion Picture	Nominated	
2004	Phone Booth	Outstanding Supporting Actor in a Motion Picture	Nominated	
2004	The Crying Game	Outstanding Actor in a TV Movie, Mini-Series or Dramatic Special	Nominated	
2007	The Last King of Scotland	Outstanding Actor in a Motion Picture	Won	
2008	The Great Debaters	Outstanding Supporting Actor in a Motion Picture	Nominated	
2014	The Butler	Outstanding Actor in a Motion Picture	Won	
2014	Himself	Chairman's Award	Won	
2016	Southpaw	Outstanding Actor in a Motion Picture	Nominated	
2019	Godfather of Harlem (as a producer)	Outstanding Drama Series	Nominated	
2020	Godfather of Harlem	Outstanding Actor in a Drama Series	Nominated	
2021	Jingle Jangle: A Christmas Journey	Outstanding Actor in a Motion Picture	Nominated	
2022	Godfather of Harlem	Outstanding Actor in a Drama Series	Nominated	

=== National Board of Review Awards ===
The National Board of Review Awards is an annual awards ceremony presented by the U.S.-based National Board of Review of Motion Pictures to honor outstanding performances in film.

Year	Work	Category	Result	Ref.
1994	Pret a Porter	Best Acting by an Ensemble	Won	
2006	The Last King of Scotland	Best Actor	Won	

=== Satellite Awards ===
The Satellite Awards are annual awards given by the International Press Academy that are commonly noted in entertainment industry journals and blogs.

Year	Work	Category	Result	Ref.
2006	The Last King of Scotland	Best Actor – Motion Picture	Won	
2006	The Shield	Best Supporting Actor – Miniseries or TV Film	Nominated	
2013	The Butler	Best Actor – Motion Picture	Nominated	

== Critics awards ==
Association	Year	Category	Work	Result	Ref.
American Black Film Festival	1999	Best Director	Hope Floats	Nominated	
American Black Film Festival	2014	Best Ensemble Cast	The Butler	Nominated	
American Black Film Festival	2014	Best Ensemble Cast	The Butler	Nominated	
American Black Film Festival	2014	Movie of the Year	Fruitvale Station (as a producer)	Nominated	
American Black Film Festival	2014	Artist of the Year	Himself	Nominated	
AAFCA Awards	2006	Best Actor	The Last King of Scotland	Won	
AAFCA Awards	2013	Best Actor	The Butler	Won	
Austin Film Critics Association	2019	Best Ensemble	Black Panther	Nominated	
Blockbuster Entertainment Award	1997	Favorite Supporting Actor – Drama	Phenomenon	Won	
Boston Society of Film Critics	2006	Best Actor	The Last King of Scotland	Nominated	
Capri Hollywood International Film Festival	2006	Capri Legend Award	Himself	Won	
Chicago Film Critics Association	2006	Best Actor	The Last King of Scotland	Won	
Christopher Award	2006	Television & Cable Award	Door to Door	Won	
Dallas–Fort Worth Film Critics Association	2006	Best Actor	The Last King of Scotland	Won	
Deauville American Film Festival	1993	Best Director	Strapped	Nominated	
Florida Film Critics Circle	2006	Best Actor	The Last King of Scotland	Won	
Georgia Film Critics Association	2019	Best Ensemble	Black Panther	Nominated	
Hollywood Film Awards	2006	Actor of the Year	The Last King of Scotland	Won	
London Film Critics' Circle	2006	Actor of the Year	The Last King of Scotland	Won	
Los Angeles Film Critics Association	2006	Best Actor	The Last King of Scotland	Won	
National Society of Film Critics	2006	Best Actor	The Last King of Scotland	Won	
New York Film Critics Circle	2006	Best Actor	The Last King of Scotland	Won	
New York Film Critics Online	2006	Best Actor	The Last King of Scotland	Won	
Online Film Critics Society	2006	Best Actor	The Last King of Scotland	Won	
Santa Barbara International Film Festival	2007	American Riviera Award	The Last King of Scotland	Won	
Santa Barbara International Film Festival	2014	Excellence in Film Award	Himself	Won	
Seattle Film Critics Society	2018	Best Ensemble	Black Panther	Nominated	
St. Louis Film Critics Association	2006	Best Actor	The Last King of Scotland	Won	
Toronto Film Critics Association	2006	Best Actor	The Last King of Scotland	Nominated	
Vancouver Film Critics Circle	2006	Best Actor	The Last King of Scotland	Won	
Washington DC Area Film Critics Association	2006	Best Actor	The Last King of Scotland	Won	
Washington DC Area Film Critics Association	2018	Best Ensemble	Black Panther	Nominated	
