= NAACP Image Award for Outstanding Supporting Actor in a Drama Series =

American television award

This article lists the winners and nominees for the NAACP Image Award for Outstanding Supporting Actor in a Drama Series. The award was first given during the 1996 ceremony and since its conception, Joe Morton holds the record for the most wins with four.

== Winners and nominees ==
Winners are listed first and highlighted in bold.

=== 1990s ===
Year	Actor	Series	Ref
1996
1996	**Ice-T**	**New York Undercover**	
1996	Ossie Davis	The Client	
1996	Bill Nunn	New York Undercover	
1996	Richard Pryor	Chicago Hope	
1996	Malcolm-Jamal Warner	Touched by an Angel	
1997	—N/a		
1998
1998	**Louis Gossett Jr.**	**Touched by an Angel**	
1998	Michael Beach	ER	
1998	Rocky Carroll	Chicago Hope	
1998	James McDaniel	N.Y.P.D. Blue	
1998	Clarence Williams III	Millennium	
1999
1999	**Ossie Davis**	**Promised Land**	
1999	Charles S. Dutton	Oz	
1999	Giancarlo Esposito	Homicide: Life on the Street	
1999	Clark Johnson	Homicide: Life on the Street	
1999	James McDaniel	N.Y.P.D. Blue	

=== 2000s ===
Year	Actor	Series	Ref
2000
2000	**Clarence Gilyard Jr.**	**Walker, Texas Ranger**	
2000	Dorian Harewood	The Hoop Life	
2000	Richard T. Jones	Judging Amy	
2000	Jesse L. Martin	Ally McBeal	
2000	James McDaniel	N.Y.P.D. Blue	
2001
2001	**Ossie Davis**	**City of Angels**	
2001	Adewale Akinnuoye-Agbaje	Oz	
2001	Hill Harper	City of Angels	
2001	Dulé Hill	The West Wing	
2001	Bokeem Woodbine	City of Angels	
2002
2002	**Ice-T**	**Law & Order: Special Victims Unit**	
2002	Babyface	Soul Food	
2002	Charles S. Dutton	The Sopranos	
2002	Dulé Hill	The West Wing	
2002	Boris Kodjoe	Soul Food	
2003
2003	**Gary Dourdan**	**CSI: Crime Scene Investigation**	
2003	Charles S. Dutton	Without a Trace	
2003	Boris Kodjoe	Soul Food	
2003	Aaron Meeks	Soul Food	
2003	Mekhi Phifer	ER	
2004
2004	**Mekhi Phifer**	**ER**	
2004	Darrin Henson	Soul Food	
2004	Dulé Hill	The West Wing	
2004	Ice-T	Law & Order: Special Victims Unit	
2004	Boris Kodjoe	Soul Food	
2005
2005	**Mekhi Phifer**	**ER**	
2005	Idris Elba	The Wire	
2005	Omar Epps	House	
2005	Darrin Henson	Soul Food	
2005	Dulé Hill	The West Wing	
2006
2006	**Gary Dourdan**	**CSI: Crime Scene Investigation**	
2006	Dennis Haysbert	24	
2006	Harry Lennix	Commander in Chief	
2006	Mekhi Phifer	ER	
2006	James Pickens Jr.	Grey's Anatomy	
2007
2007	**Omar Epps**	**House**	
2007	Gary Dourdan	CSI: Crime Scene Investigation	
2007	James Pickens Jr.	Grey's Anatomy	
2007	Wendell Pierce	The Wire	
2007	Glynn Turman	The Wire	
2008
2008	**Omar Epps**	**House**	
2008	Taye Diggs	Private Practice	
2008	Mekhi Phifer	ER	
2008	James Pickens Jr.	Grey's Anatomy	
2008	Blair Underwood	Dirty Sexy Money	
2009
2009	**Taye Diggs**	**Private Practice**	
2009	Laurence Fishburne	CSI: Crime Scene Investigation	
2009	James Pickens Jr.	Grey's Anatomy	
2009	Blair Underwood	Dirty Sexy Money	
2009	Michael K. Williams	The Wire	

=== 2010s ===
Year	Actor	Series	Ref
2010
2010	**Delroy Lindo**	**Law & Order: Special Victims Unit**	
2010	Rocky Carroll	NCIS	
2010	Mekhi Phifer	Lie to Me	
2010	James Pickens Jr.	Grey's Anatomy	
2010	Corey Reynolds	The Closer	
2011
2011	**Terrence Howard**	**Law & Order: Los Angeles**	
2011	André Braugher	Men of a Certain Age	
2011	Nelsan Ellis	True Blood	
2011	Giancarlo Esposito	Breaking Bad	
2011	James Pickens Jr.	Grey's Anatomy	
2012
2012	**James Pickens Jr.**	**Grey's Anatomy**	
2012	Nelsan Ellis	True Blood	
2012	Omar Epps	House	
2012	Ice-T	Law & Order: Special Victims Unit	
2012	Corey Reynolds	The Closer	
2013
2013	**Omar Epps**	**House**	
2013	Rocky Carroll	NCIS	
2013	Rockmond Dunbar	Sons of Anarchy	
2013	Dev Patel	The Newsroom	
2013	Clarke Peters	Treme	
2014
2014	**Joe Morton**	**Scandal**	
2014	Guillermo Díaz	Scandal	
2014	Columbus Short	Scandal	
2014	Michael K. Williams	Boardwalk Empire	
2014	Jeffrey Wright	Boardwalk Empire	
2015
2015	**Joe Morton**	**Scandal**	
2015	Guillermo Díaz	Scandal	
2015	Alfred Enoch	How to Get Away with Murder	
2015	Courtney B. Vance	Masters of Sex	
2015	Jeffrey Wright	Boardwalk Empire	
2016
2016	**Joe Morton**	**Scandal**	
2016	Guillermo Díaz	Scandal	
2016	Alfred Enoch	How to Get Away with Murder	
2016	Bryshere Y. Gray	Empire	
2016	Jussie Smollett	Empire	
2017
2017	**Jussie Smollett**	**Empire**	
2017	Trai Byers	Empire	
2017	Alfred Enoch	How to Get Away with Murder	
2017	Joe Morton	Scandal	
2017	Jesse Williams	Grey's Anatomy	
2018
2018	**Joe Morton**	**Scandal**	
2018	Trai Byers	Empire	
2018	Bryshere Gray	Empire	
2018	Jussie Smollett	Empire	
2018	Dondre Whitfield	Queen Sugar	
2019
2019	**Jesse Williams**	**Grey's Anatomy**	
2019	Romany Malco	A Million Little Things	
2019	Joe Morton	Scandal	
2019	Wendell Pierce	Tom Clancy's Jack Ryan	
2019	Jussie Smollett	Empire	

=== 2020s ===
Year	Actress	Series	Ref
2020
2020	**Harold Perrineau**	**Claws**	
2020	Giancarlo Esposito	Godfather of Harlem	
2020	Delroy Lindo	The Good Fight	
2020	Wendell Pierce	Tom Clancy's Jack Ryan	
2020	Nigél Thatch	Godfather of Harlem	
2021
2021	**Cliff "Method Man" Smith**	**Power Book II: Ghost**	
2021	Delroy Lindo	The Good Fight	
2021	J. Alphonse Nicholson	P-Valley	
2021	Michael K. Williams	Lovecraft Country	
2021	Jeffrey Wright	Westworld	
2022
2022	**Cliff "Method Man" Smith**	**Power Book II: Ghost**	
2022	Giancarlo Esposito	Godfather of Harlem	
2022	Daniel Ezra	All American	
2022	Alex Hibbert	The Chi	
2022	Joe Morton	Our Kind of People	

== Multiple wins and nominations ==
=== Wins ===
4 wins

- Joe Morton

3 wins

- Omar Epps

2 wins

- Ossie Davis
- Gary Dourdan
- Ice-T
- Mekhi Phifer
- Cliff "Method Man" Smith

=== Nominations ===
7 nominations

- Joe Morton
- James Pickens Jr.

6 nominations

- Mekhi Phifer

5 nominations

- Omar Epps

4 nominations

- Dulé Hill
- Ice-T
- Giancarlo Esposito
- Jussie Smollett

3 nominations

- Rocky Carroll
- Ossie Davis
- Guillermo Díaz
- Gary Dourdan
- Charles S. Dutton
- Alfred Enoch
- Boris Kodjoe
- Delroy Lindo
- James McDaniel
- Wendell Pierce
- Michael K. Williams
- Jeffrey Wright

2 nominations

- Trai Byers
- Taye Diggs
- Nelsan Ellis
- Bryshere Y. Gray
- Darrin Henson
- Corey Reynolds
- Cliff "Method Man" Smith
- Blair Underwood
- Jesse Williams
