= By Whatever Means Necessary: The Times of Godfather of Harlem =

Harlem documentary Series

- Genre: Docuseries
- Directed by: Keith McQuirter
- Composer: Roger Suen
- Country of origin: United States
- Original language: English
- No. of episodes: 4

Production
- Executive producers: Nina Yang Bongiovi; Jill Kurkhart; Keith McQuirter; Swizz Beatz; Forest Whitaker; Michael Wright
- Producer: Cyndee Readdean
- Cinematography: Derek Wiesehahn
- Production companies: Decoder Media; Significant Productions

Original release
- Network: Epix
- Release: November 8 – November 29, 2020

Related
- Godfather of Harlem

By Whatever Means Necessary: The Times of Godfather of Harlem is an American four-part television documentary series that premiered on Epix on November 8, 2020, and concluded on November 29, 2020. It serves as a companion series to the crime drama television series Godfather of Harlem.

== Overview ==
Set between 1960 and 1969, the series examines a decade of profound cultural transformation in Harlem. It highlights the role of Black musicians and activists who used their art to confront racial injustice. Through genres such as soul, R&B, jazz, Latin, and early forms of rap, the series shows how music both reflected and shaped the civil rights movement, amplifying messages of resistance that echoed globally.

The series includes archival footage and interviews with cast members from Godfather of Harlem, including Forest Whitaker, Giancarlo Esposito, and Ilfenesh Hadera, as well as artists and activists such as Gladys Knight, Herbie Hancock, Nile Rodgers, A$AP Ferg, Reverend Al Sharpton, Martha Reeves, and former U.S. Representative Charles Rangel.

== Episodes ==
Episode	Title	Original air date
1	Mecca	November 8, 2020
2	Freedom Songs	November 15, 2020
3	Crossroads	November 22, 2020
4	Power	November 29, 2020

== Production ==
Epix announced the series in July 2020. It was produced by Decoder Media and Significant Productions. The series premiered on November 8, 2020, on Epix.

== Reception ==
The series won the NAACP Image Award for Outstanding Directing in a Documentary (Television or Motion Picture) in 2021. Public television program MetroFocus profiled the series in November 2020, and discussed Harlem's cultural and political landscape in the 1960s and how the music of the era became a form of resistance.
