= Markuann Smith =

American actor (born 1977)

- Born: November 19, 1977 (age 48); New York City
- Occupations: Actor, producer, and director

Markuann Smith (born November 19, 1977, in New York City) is an American actor, producer, and director. He is the Executive Producer of Epix series drama Godfather of Harlem.

== Career ==
Markuann was born in NYC and raised in Harlem. He graduated from Morgan State University minored in theater. He is an American actor, producer, and director who is the Executive Producer of Epix series drama Godfather of Harlem. Markuann's brother, Father M.C., at the outset of the New Jack Swing era, signed a deal with Uptown MCA Records, a Hip Hop and R&B labels of the early 1990s.

He began his career working in production at Black Entertainment Television (BET) after college. He also worked in reality television as the presenter of VH1's Let's Talk About Pep, which featured Pep of Salt N' Pepa, the girl hip-hop trio of the 1990s.

Markuann Smith has appeared on The Dave Chappelle Show, Juice, Poetic Justice, Code Blue, and A Good Day to Die. Also, he plays the Junie Byrd character in Godfather of Harlem.
