= Paul Eckstein =

American actor and television writer (1963–2023)

- Born: 1963; New York City, New York, U.S.
- Died: June 6, 2023 (aged 59); Jamaica
- Notable work: Godfather of Harlem
- Spouse: Hala Khouri

Paul Eckstein (1963 – June 6, 2023) was an American actor and television writer and producer, known for his work on Godfather of Harlem, Narcos, and Law & Order: Criminal Intent. Eckstein was a founding member of Naked Angels.

Eckstein was born in Brooklyn, New York, in 1963, and died on June 6, 2023, at the age of 59. He had been in Jamaica at the time, where he was leading a screenwriting workshop.
