= Sacrifice (2014 film) =

- Directed by: Michael Cohn
- Written by: Michael Cohn
- Produced by: Jeanine Rohn; Joseph Sememse
- Starring: Dermot Mulroney; Melora Walters; Austin Abrams
- Cinematography: Steven Parker
- Edited by: Heather Born; Brian Ufberg
- Music by: Roger Suen
- Production company: JuntoBox Films
- Distributed by: Paladin
- Release date: October 2014 (Woodstock)
- Running time: 105 minutes
- Country: United States
- Language: English

Sacrifice is a 2014 American thriller drama film written and directed by Michael Cohn and starring Dermot Mulroney, Melora Walters and Austin Abrams.

== Premise ==
Four teenagers from a small Texas town come face-to-face with their own consciences after a tragic accident.

== Cast ==
- Luke Kleintank as Hank
- Austin Abrams as Tim
- Lewis Tan as Ben Kittman
- Brandon Mychal Smith as Kaz
- James McDaniel as Traeger
- Melora Walters as Enid
- Dermot Mulroney as Justin

== Production ==
Filming occurred in The Woodlands, Texas and wrapped in May 2013.

== Release ==
The film premiered at the Woodstock Film Festival in October 2014.

== Reception ==
Ella Taylor of Variety gave the film a positive review and wrote, "Strong performances elevate this intermittently absorbing family melodrama from writer-director Michael Cohn."
