= JuntoBox Films =

Defunct American film production company

- Type: Private
- Industry: Film
- Founded: 2012
- Founder: Philippe Caland
- Key people: Forest Whitaker (co-chair)

JuntoBox Films was a Santa Monica-based independent film production company that focused on micro-budget films. It featured a social media platform where creators could share ideas and collaborate to make their ideas into films, and where members could vote which screenplays would be financed by JuntoBox. JuntoBox Films has been inactive since 2014/2015.

== History ==
Philippe Caland founded JuntoBox in 2012 and officially launched it at that year's South by Southwest. The partnership with Indiegogo, a crowdfunding website, started upon its foundation. Actor Forest Whitaker was announced as co-chair in March 2012. The company's name was taken from Junto, a mutual improvement club started by Benjamin Franklin in 1727.

== Structure ==
JuntoBox allowed actors, directors, producers, and writers to share ideas via a social media platform so they were able to collaborate with those without an agent or previous professional experience. Site users then voted on which films they thought JuntoBox should support, both as a financer and as a mentor. Those chosen still go through a vetting process, including traditional auditions for the chosen actors. The first films green-lighted by JuntoBox were Passenger, Sacrifice (2014), Anthem, and Sharon 1.2.3. (originally Sharon is Caring).

In 2013, JuntoBox partnered with the Slamdance Film Festival to increase the winnings of the festival's annual screenplay competition. Along with the usual $10,000 prize money, JuntoBox committed at least $50,000 towards production of the winning screenplay.

In 2014, JuntoBox Films launched a three-month long workshop series called the Feature Film Incubator that sought to bring screenplays into the development phase. This included "one-one-one meetings with industry professionals-including story analysts, casting directors and line producers." Those selected to participate in the program "receive[d] budgeting and distribution consulting" and other financial and mentorship resources. At least one of the films created during the Incubator was expected to be funded following the pitch session that marked the end of the program.

== Films ==
In total, JuntoBox has sponsored the following films:

- Passenger - written/directed by Tony McGrath, produced by Alex Malt
- Sacrifice (2014) - written/directed by Michael Cohn, produced by Jeanine Rohn and Joseph Sememse
- American Anthem - originally Anthem; written by John Carr
- Sharon 1.2.3. (2018) - originally Sharon is Caring - written by Wesley Mills, directed by Mark Brown
- Repentance (2013) - written by Shintaro Shimosawa and Philippe Caland, directed by Philippe Caland
- The Driver - written by George Richards, directed by Alex Ardenti, produced by Philippe Caland
- Operator (2016) - co-written/directed by Logan Kibens
- Die Like a Man (expected 2022) - written/directed by Eric Nazarian, produced by Javier Chapa
- God Loves Stu - written/directed by Aldo Velasco, produced by David Allen Cress
- Letters from the President - written by Tony Tambi, directed by Michael D. Olmos
- The Locksmith - written by Blair Kroeber, produced by Ted Kroeber
- Mullet - written/directed by Rafael Del Toro
- White Mice - co-written/directed by Simon Arthur, produced by Katie Holly and Claire Mundell
- The Sweet Life (2016) - originally Good Humor; written by Jared Rappaport, directed by Rob Spera, produced by Bonnie Curtis and Julie Lynn
