= Hughie =

1958 play by Eugene O'Neill

- Poster for 1975 Broadway production starring Ben Gazzara
- Written by: Eugene O'Neill
- Characters: Erie Smith; Charlie Hughes
- Original language: English
- Setting: Between 4 and 5 a.m. in the lobby of a small hotel on a West Side street in Midtown Manhattan. The summer of 1928.

Premiere
- Date premiered: 1958
- Place premiered: Royal Dramatic Theatre; Stockholm, Sweden

Hughie is a short two-character play by Eugene O'Neill set in the lobby of a small hotel on a West Side street in Midtown Manhattan, New York, during the summer of 1928. The play is essentially a long monologue delivered by a small-time hustler named Erie Smith to the hotel's new night clerk Charlie Hughes, lamenting how Smith's luck has gone bad since the death of Hughie, Hughes' predecessor. O'Neill wrote Hughie in 1942, although it did not receive its world premiere until 1958, when it was staged in Sweden at the Royal Dramatic Theatre with Bengt Eklund as Erie Smith. It was first staged in English at the Theatre Royal, Bath, in 1963 with Burgess Meredith as Erie.

The play was first presented on Broadway in 1964 starring Jason Robards as Erie and directed by José Quintero. Robards received a Tony Award nomination for his performance, and revived the production in 1975 in Berkeley, California, with Jack Dodson as Charlie Hughes. Robards and Dodson returned to perform it at the Hyde Park Festival Theatre in 1981 and with the Trinity Repertory Company in Providence, Rhode Island, in 1991, also televising their performances in 1984 for PBS.

Hughie has been produced on Broadway three times since the 1964 Robards/Quintero production. In 1975 it was paired in repertory with David Scott Milton's play Duet, this time with Ben Gazzara as Erie (who also won a Tony Award nomination for the role), and in 1996 by the Circle in the Square Theatre in a production directed by and starring Al Pacino. The designers for that production were David Gallo (sets), Donald Holder (lights), Candice Donnelly (costumes) and John Gromada (sound). Goodman Theatre in Chicago put on the play in January and February 2010, with Brian Dennehy in the starring role. The production was variously well-reviewed, with emphasis on Dennehy's strong performance. Later in 2010, Long Wharf Theatre in New Haven, Connecticut, brought the show to its stage with Brian Dennehy as Erie once again. The play was revived in 2013 at the Shakespeare Theatre Company in Washington, D.C., with Richard Schiff as Erie. It returned for a fourth time to Broadway with Forest Whitaker as Erie Smith in February 2016. The 2016 revival was directed by Michael Grandage with Darren Bagert as a lead producer. The production had a shortened run of 55 performances and closed on March 27, 2016.

Hughie has been televised at least five times in addition to the 1984 Robards/Dodson version: in 1959 (for Swedish television), 1960 (Norwegian television), 1963 (Dutch television), in 1970 (Italian Television) and 1983 (French television).
