= Nigél Thatch =

American actor (born 1976)

- Born: August 8, 1976 (age 49); East St. Louis, Illinois, US
- Occupation: Actor

Nigél Thatch (born August 8, 1976) is an American actor. He played Malcolm X in the first two seasons of the Epix television series Godfather of Harlem and was nominated for a best supporting actor award at the 51st NAACP Image Awards for the role. He also portrayed Malcolm X in the 2014 film Selma.

== Early life ==
Thatch was born in East St. Louis, Illinois in 1976.

== Career ==
In the 1990s he was on the television series The Parent 'Hood. Thatch appeared as "Leon", an egotistical money hungry athlete, in a series of Budweiser commercials. He played baseball for the Schaumburg Flyers.

In 2017 he was part of the CW series Valor. He was also in American Dreams (2002).

From 2019 to 2021, he played the role of Malcolm X in Godfather of Harlem, for which he was nominated as for best supporting actor at the 51st NAACP Image Awards.

== Filmography ==
- The Players Club (1998)
- 100 Kilos (2001)
- Selma (2014)

== Television ==
- Godfather of Harlem (2019–2021)
- Valor (2017–2018)
- American Dreams (2002)
- The Parent 'Hood (1990s)
- Sister, Sister (TV series) – "Mixed Doubles" (1990)
- Moesha "Isn't She Lovely?" (1999)
- Girlfriends – "The Importance of Being Frank" (2000)
- Half & Half – "The Big Type Cast Episode" (2004)
- One on One – "Fatal Attractions" (2002)
