= Nina Yang Bongiovi =

American film producer

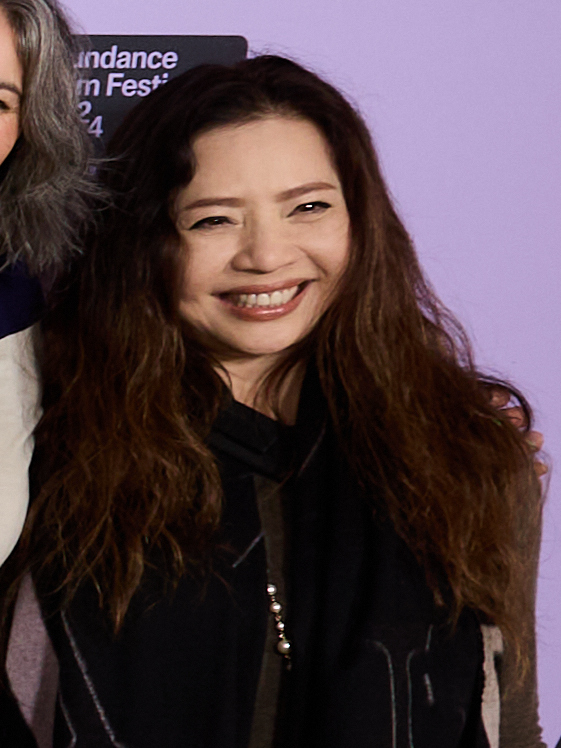
- Bongiovi in 2024
- Education: University of Southern California
- Occupations: Film producer, academic administrator
- Years active: 2000–present
- Spouse: Anthony Bongiovi (m. 2012)

Nina Yang Bongiovi is an American film producer and academic administrator. She is the co-founder of Significant Productions with Forest Whitaker and the Associate Chair of the Peter Stark Producing Program at the USC School of Cinematic Arts. Her notable producing credits include Fruitvale Station (2013), Dope (2015), Songs My Brothers Taught Me (2015), Roxanne Roxanne (2017), Sorry to Bother You (2018), and Passing (2021).

== Life and career ==
Bongiovi was born in Taiwan, and moved to the United States when she was five years old, with her siblings and mother. She received her graduate degree in Entertainment Management at the University of Southern California.

She spent the first decade of her career working in the United States and Hong Kong film industries. During this time, she was involved in productions including China Strike Force (2000, Hong Kong), Mail Order Wife (2004, U.S.), Confessions of an Action Star (2005, U.S.), and The Children of Huang Shi (2008, China). In 2010, Bongiovi met actor Forest Whitaker and they partnered to form Significant Productions, a production company that produces multi-cultural feature films, documentaries, and television series.

Bongiovi and Whitaker produced the 2013 American film Fruitvale Station, written and directed by Ryan Coogler and based on the story of the shooting of Oscar Grant in 2009. Bongiovi became involved with the project after film professor at USC, Jed Dannenbaum, contacted her to introduce her to Coogler, then a student of Dannenbaum. Fruitvale Station met with critical acclaim, winning the 2013 Sundance Film Festival Grand Jury Prize and Audience Award as well as the 2013 Cannes Film Festival L'Avenir Award. For their work on the film, Bongiovi and Whitaker won the Producers Guild of America Stanley Kramer Award, which is given for films that highlight social issues.

In 2014, Bongiovi and Whitaker produced Repentance, also starring Whitaker, followed by the 2015 films Dope and Songs My Brothers Taught Me. Both Dope and Songs My Brothers Taught Me were selected to play at the 2015 Sundance Film Festival and the 2015 Cannes Film Festival.

Bongiovi and Whitaker produced Sorry to Bother You (2018), a satire film directed by Boots Riley.

In 2019, Bongiovi produced the television series Godfather of Harlem, starring Whitaker.

In 2021, Bongiovi was named Associate Chair of the Peter Stark Producing Program at the USC School of Cinematic Arts.

== Personal life ==
She married Anthony Bongiovi, the younger brother of musician Jon Bon Jovi, in 2012.
