= Forest Whitaker =

American actor (born 1961)

- Whitaker at TIFF in 2026
- Born: Forest Steven Whitaker III; July 15, 1961 (age 65); Longview, Texas, U.S.
- Education: California State Polytechnic University, Pomona; University of Southern California (BFA); New York University; Drama Studio London
- Occupations: Actor; filmmaker; activist
- Years active: 1981–present
- Works: Full list
- Spouse: Keisha Nash (m. 1996; div. 2021)
- Children: 3
- Awards: Full list

Forest Steven Whitaker III (born July 15, 1961) is an American actor, filmmaker, and activist. His accolades include an Academy Award, a Golden Globe Award, a British Academy Film Award, two Screen Actors Guild Awards, the Cannes Film Festival Award for Best Actor and the Honorary Palme d'Or.

After making his film debut in Fast Times at Ridgemont High (1982), Whitaker went on to earn a reputation for intensive character study work for films, such as Platoon (1986), Good Morning, Vietnam (1987), Bird (1988), The Crying Game (1992), Phenomenon (1996), Ghost Dog: The Way of the Samurai (1999), Battlefield Earth (2000), The Great Debaters (2007), The Butler (2013), Arrival (2016), and Respect (2021). He has also appeared in The Color of Money (1986), Panic Room (2002), Where the Wild Things Are (2009), and Black Panther (2018) as Zuri. Whitaker starred in the Star Wars franchise as Saw Gerrera, appearing in the film Rogue One (2016) and would later reprise the role in the television series Star Wars: Rebels (2017) and Andor (2022–2025), as well as the video game Star Wars Jedi: Fallen Order (2019).

Whitaker won the Academy Award for Best Actor for his portrayal of Ugandan dictator Idi Amin in the historical drama The Last King of Scotland (2006). Whitaker made his directorial debut with the television film Strapped (1993) and directed the films Waiting to Exhale (1995), Hope Floats (1998), and First Daughter (2004). On television, he portrayed Lieutenant Jon Kavanaugh on the fifth and sixth seasons of The Shield (2006–2007) and since 2019, he has starred as Bumpy Johnson in the Epix crime drama series Godfather of Harlem.

He made his Broadway debut in the revival of Eugene O'Neill's Hughie (2016). Apart from his acting career, Whitaker is also known for his humanitarian work and activism. In 2011, he was inducted as a UNESCO Goodwill Ambassador, later receiving a promotion to Special Envoy for Peace and Reconciliation, and is the CEO of Whitaker Peace and Development Initiative (WPDI), a non-profit outreach program.

== Early life and education ==
Forest Steven Whitaker was born on July 15, 1961, in Longview, Texas, the son of Laura Francis (née Smith), a special education teacher, and Forest E. Whitaker Jr., an insurance salesman. When Whitaker was in elementary school, his family moved to Carson, California, a suburb of Los Angeles. He has two younger brothers and an older sister. His first role as an actor was the lead in Dylan Thomas's play Under Milk Wood.

Whitaker attended Palisades High School, where he played on the football team and sang in the choir, graduating in 1979. He entered California State Polytechnic University, Pomona on a football scholarship, but a back injury made him change his major to music (singing). He toured England with the Cal Poly Chamber Singers in 1980. While still at Cal Poly, he briefly changed his major to drama. He later transferred to the Thornton School of Music at the University of Southern California (USC) to study opera as a tenor and was subsequently accepted into the university's Drama Conservatory. He graduated from USC with a Bachelor of Fine Arts degree in Acting in 1982. He then took a course at Drama Studio London at its now defunct California branch. He was pursuing a degree in "The Core of Conflict: Studies in Peace and Reconciliation" at New York University's Gallatin School of Individualized Study in 2004.

== Career ==
=== 1982–1987: Rise to prominence ===
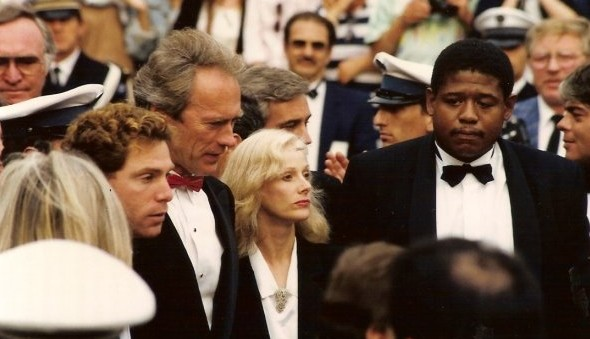
Michael Zelniker, Clint Eastwood, Sondra Locke and Forest Whitaker promoting the film Bird at the 1988 Cannes Film Festival

Whitaker has a long history of working with well-regarded film directors and actors. In his first onscreen performance of note, he had a supporting role playing a high school football player in the 1982 film version of Amy Heckerling's coming-of-age teen-retrospective Fast Times at Ridgemont High. In 1986, he appeared in Martin Scorsese's The Color of Money and Oliver Stone's Vietnam War drama film Platoon. The following year, he co-starred in the comedy Good Morning, Vietnam alongside Robin Williams. He also appeared in the 1985 movie Vision Quest, which guest starred Madonna.

After completing several films in the early 1980s, Whitaker gained additional roles in multiple television shows. On the series Diff'rent Strokes, he played a bully in the 1985 episode "Bully for Arnold". That same year, Whitaker also played the part of a comic book salesman in the Amazing Stories episode "Gather Ye Acorns". He appeared in the first and second parts of North and South in 1985 and 1986. Throughout the 1990s, Whitaker mainly had roles in made-for-cable films which aired on HBO, including Criminal Justice, The Enemy Within, and Witness Protection.

=== 1988–2006: Breakthrough and acclaim ===
In 1988, Whitaker appeared in the film Bloodsport and had his first lead role starring as jazz alto saxophonist Charlie "Bird" Parker in Clint Eastwood's Bird. To prepare himself for the part, Whitaker took saxophone lessons and sequestered himself in a loft with only a bed, couch, and an alto saxophone, having also conducted extensive research and talked to numerous people who knew Parker. His performance, which has been called "transcendent", earned him the Best Actor award at the 1988 Cannes Film Festival and a Golden Globe nomination.

Whitaker continued to work with a number of well-known directors throughout the 1990s. He starred in the 1990 film Downtown, directed by Richard Benjamin, and was cast in the pivotal role of Jody, a captive British soldier in director Neil Jordan's 1992 film The Crying Game, for which he used an English accent. Todd McCarthy of Variety described Whitaker's performance as "big-hearted", "hugely emotional", and "simply terrific". He was a member of the cast that won the first ever National Board of Review Award for Best Acting by an Ensemble for Robert Altman's film, Prêt-à-Porter, in 1994. Whitaker also played an abusive, alcoholic father in the star studded film, Jason's Lyric in 1994 alongside Jada Pinkett Smith and Allen Payne. In 1995, he gave a "characteristically emotional performance" in Wayne Wang and Paul Auster's Smoke, and appeared in the science-fiction film Species. In 1996, he played the role of a good-natured man in Phenomenon, alongside John Travolta and Robert Duvall, which earned him a Blockbuster Entertainment Award for Favorite Supporting Actor – Drama, and was also nominated for NAACP Image Award for Outstanding Supporting Actor in a Motion Picture.

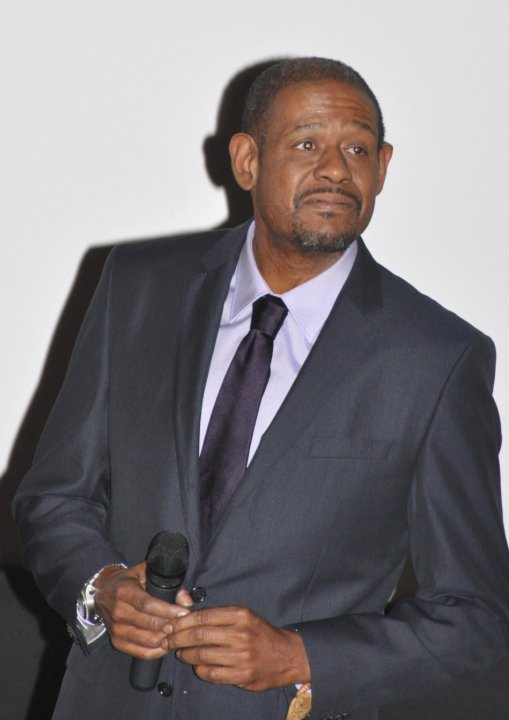
Whitaker presenting the film My Own Love Song in Paris, 2010

Whitaker branched out into producing and directing in the 1990s. He co-produced and co-starred in A Rage in Harlem in 1991. He made his directorial debut with a grim film about inner-city gun violence, Strapped, for HBO in 1993 – and won the International Critics' Award at the Toronto International Film Festival. In 1995, he directed his first theatrical feature, Waiting to Exhale, which was based on the Terry McMillan novel of the same name. Roger Ebert observed that the tone of the film resembled Whitaker's own acting style: "measured, serene, confident". Whitaker also directed co-star Whitney Houston's music video of the movie's theme song, "Exhale (Shoop Shoop)". Whitaker continued his directing career with the 1998 romantic comedy, Hope Floats, starring Sandra Bullock and Harry Connick Jr., which he also executive produced. He directed Katie Holmes in the romantic comedy First Daughter in 2004, while also an executive producer on the film; he had previously co-starred with Holmes in Phone Booth in 2002. He gained experience as the executive producer of several made-for-television movies, most notably the 2002 Emmy-award-winning Door to Door, starring William H. Macy.

Whitaker played a serene, pigeon-raising, bushido-following, mob hit man in Ghost Dog: The Way of the Samurai, a 1999 film written and directed by Jim Jarmusch. Many consider this to have been a "definitive role" for Whitaker. In a manner similar to his preparation for Bird, he again immersed himself in his character's world—he studied Eastern philosophy and meditated for long hours "to hone his inner spiritual hitman". Jarmusch has told interviewers that he developed the title character with Whitaker in mind; The New York Times review of the film observed that "[I]t's hard to think of another actor who could play a cold-blooded killer with such warmth and humanity." From 2002 to 2003, Whitaker was the host and narrator of 44 new episodes of the Rod Serling classic The Twilight Zone, which lasted one season on UPN. After working in several film roles, he returned to television in 2006 when he joined the cast of FX's police serial The Shield, as Lieutenant Jon Kavanaugh, who was determined to prove that the lead character, Vic Mackey (Michael Chiklis), is a dirty cop. As opposed to his previous character work, Whitaker stated that he merely had to draw on his childhood years growing up in South Central Los Angeles for the role. He received rave reviews for his performance—Variety called it a "crackling-good guest stint"—and he reprised the role in the show's 2007 season.

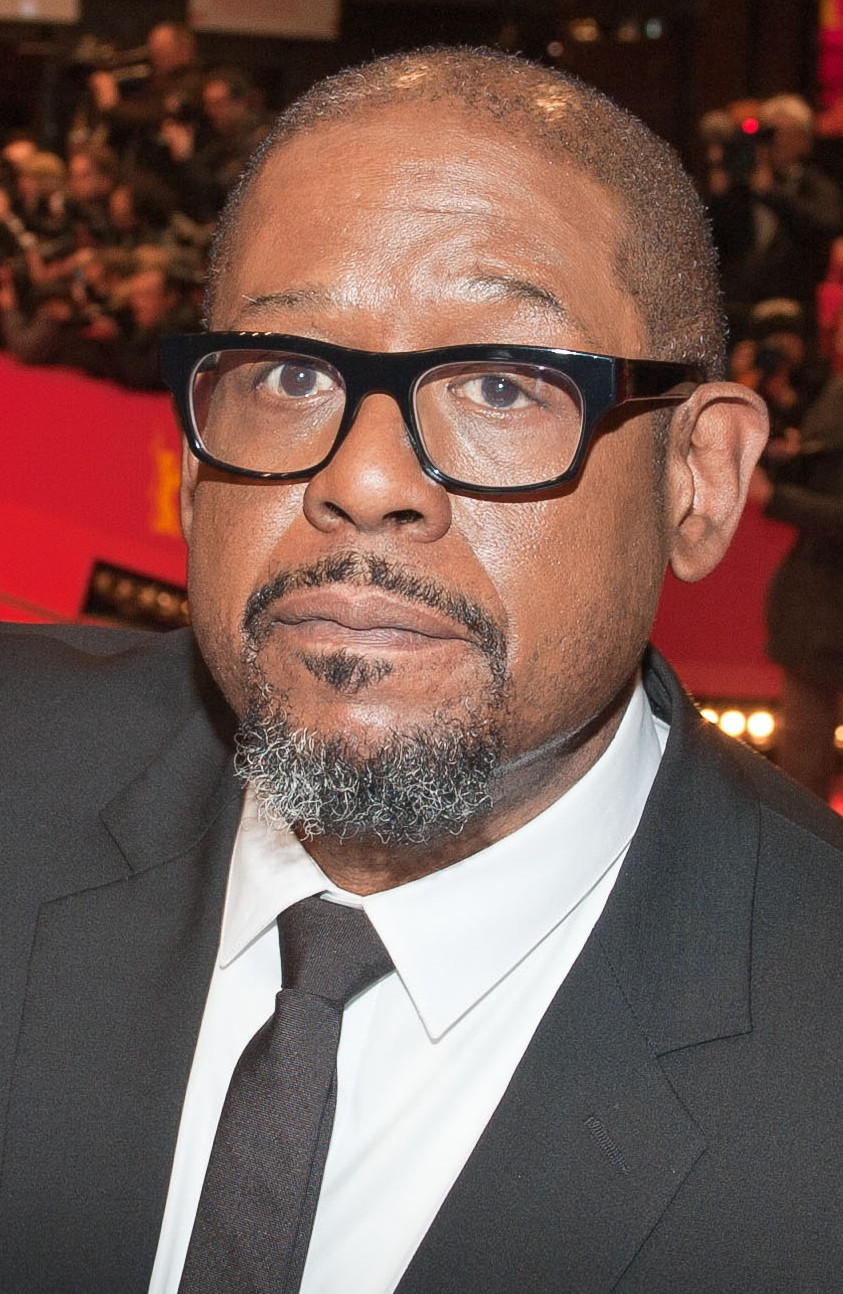
Whitaker at the premiere of Two Men in Town (2014)

Whitaker next appeared in what has been called one of the worst films ever made, the 2000 production of Battlefield Earth, based on the novel of the same name by L. Ron Hubbard. The film was widely criticized as a notorious commercial and critical disaster. However, Whitaker's performance was lauded by the film's director, Roger Christian, who commented that, "Everybody's going to be very surprised" by Whitaker, who "found this huge voice and laugh." Battlefield Earth won seven Razzie Awards. Whitaker later expressed his regret for participating in the film.

In 2001, Whitaker played FBI agent Jules Bernard in the British/Canadian film The Fourth Angel. In that same year Whitaker had a small, uncredited role in the Wong Kar-wai-directed The Follow, one of five short films produced by BMW that year to promote its cars. He co-starred in Joel Schumacher's 2002 thriller Phone Booth with Kiefer Sutherland and Colin Farrell. That year, he also co-starred with Jodie Foster in Panic Room. His performance as the film's "bad guy" was described as "a subtle chemistry of aggression and empathy". In the fall of 2006, Whitaker started a multi-episode story arc on ER as Curtis Ames, a man who comes into the ER with a cough, but quickly faces the long-term consequences of a paralyzing stroke; he sues, then takes out his anger on Dr. Luka Kovač, who he blames for the strokes. Whitaker received a Primetime Emmy Award nomination for his performance in the series. Also in 2006, Whitaker appeared in T.I.'s music video "Live in the Sky" alongside Jamie Foxx.

Whitaker's 2006 portrayal of Idi Amin in the film The Last King of Scotland earned him positive reviews by critics as well as multiple awards and honors. To portray the dictator, Whitaker gained 50 pounds, learned to play the accordion, and immersed himself in research. He read books about Amin, watched news and documentary footage featuring Amin, and spent time in Uganda meeting with Amin's friends, relatives, generals, and victims; he also learned Swahili and mastered Amin's East African accent. His performance earned him the Academy Award for Best Actor, making him the fourth black actor in history to do so, joining the ranks of Sidney Poitier, Denzel Washington, and Jamie Foxx. In his acceptance speech, Whitaker said: "When I first started acting, it was because of my desire to connect to everyone, to that thing inside each of us, that light that I believe exists in all of us. Because acting for me is about believing in that connection; and it's a connection so strong, it's a connection so deep that we feel it and through our combined belief we can create a new reality." For that same role, he was also recognized with the British Academy Film Award, Golden Globe Award, National Board of Review Award, Screen Actors Guild Award, and accolades from the Broadcast Film Critics Association, London Film Critics' Circle Award, Los Angeles Film Critics Association, National Society of Film Critics, and New York Film Critics Circle among others. It is the only performance to have swept these awards.

=== 2007–2018: Established actor ===
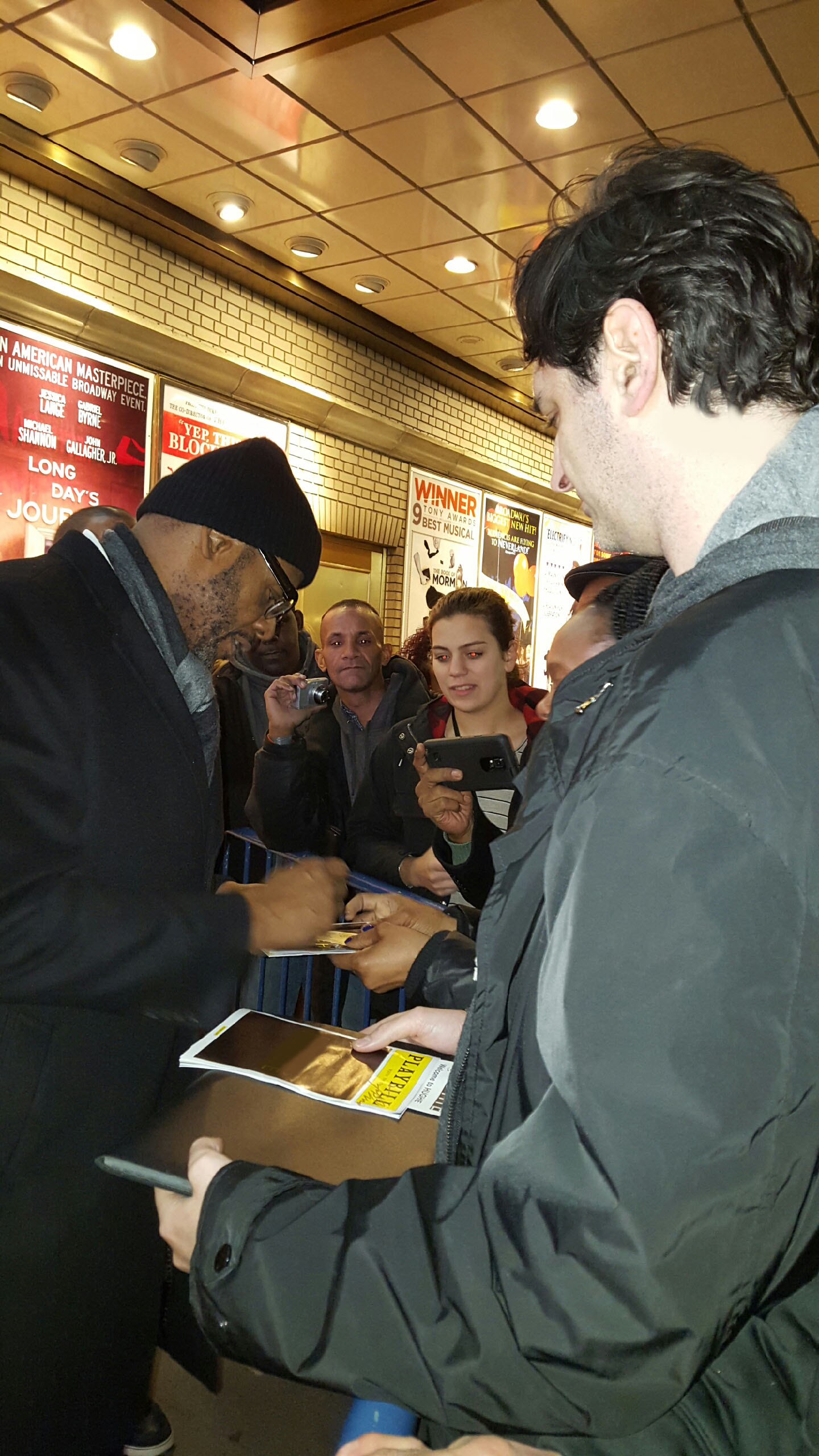
Whitaker signing playbills after making his Broadway debut in Hughie (2016)

In 2007, Whitaker played Dr. James Farmer Sr. in The Great Debaters, for which he received an Image Award nomination for Outstanding Supporting Actor. In 2008, Whitaker appeared in three films, first as a business man known only as Happiness, who likes butterflies, in the film The Air I Breathe. He also portrayed a rogue police captain in Street Kings, and a heroic tourist in Vantage Point. Whitaker was cast in the Criminal Minds spin-off Criminal Minds: Suspect Behavior, that was subsequently cancelled by CBS on May 17, 2011. Under Frank Cooper, he was the creator and producer of DEWmocracy.com, an interactive video game, short film, and website that allowed people to select a new flavor of Mountain Dew. This campaign turned into the most successful launch of a soft drink in Mountain Dew's history. Whitaker appears in the Jamie Foxx featuring T-Pain 2008 music video "Blame It".

In 2013, after a small career slump where he starred in a few straight-to-video films, Whitaker has enjoyed a career resurgence, having played the lead role in Lee Daniels' The Butler, which has become one of his greatest critical and commercial successes to date. Whitaker won the NAACP Image Award for Outstanding Actor in a Motion Picture for that film as well as nominations for the Screen Actors Guild Award for Outstanding Performance by a Male Actor in a Leading Role. Whitaker also starred in the film Black Nativity and co-starred in 2013's The Last Stand, playing an FBI agent chasing an escaped drug cartel leader.

In 2016, Whitaker played Saw Gerrera in the film Rogue One: A Star Wars Story, and reprised this role for the Star Wars Rebels animated series. That same year he made his Broadway debut in a revival of Eugene O'Neill's play Hughie at the Booth Theatre, directed by Michael Grandage. David Rooney of The Hollywood Reporter wrote of Whitaker's performance, "With his sleepy eyes, soulful voice and fluttering hands, Whitaker is a superb actor who can wear sorrow like a baggy overcoat".

Whitaker portrayed Colonel Weber in the science fiction drama film Arrival (2016) and portrayed Archbishop Desmond Tutu in 2017's The Forgiven. In 2017 and 2018, Whitaker had an eleven-episode arc on Empire, which saw him reunited with Lee Daniels after their work together on The Butler. For his portrayal of Zuri in the Ryan Coogler directed Marvel Cinematic Universe action adventure film Black Panther (2018), Whitaker shared in winning the Screen Actors Guild Award for Outstanding Performance by a Cast in a Motion Picture.

=== 2019–present ===
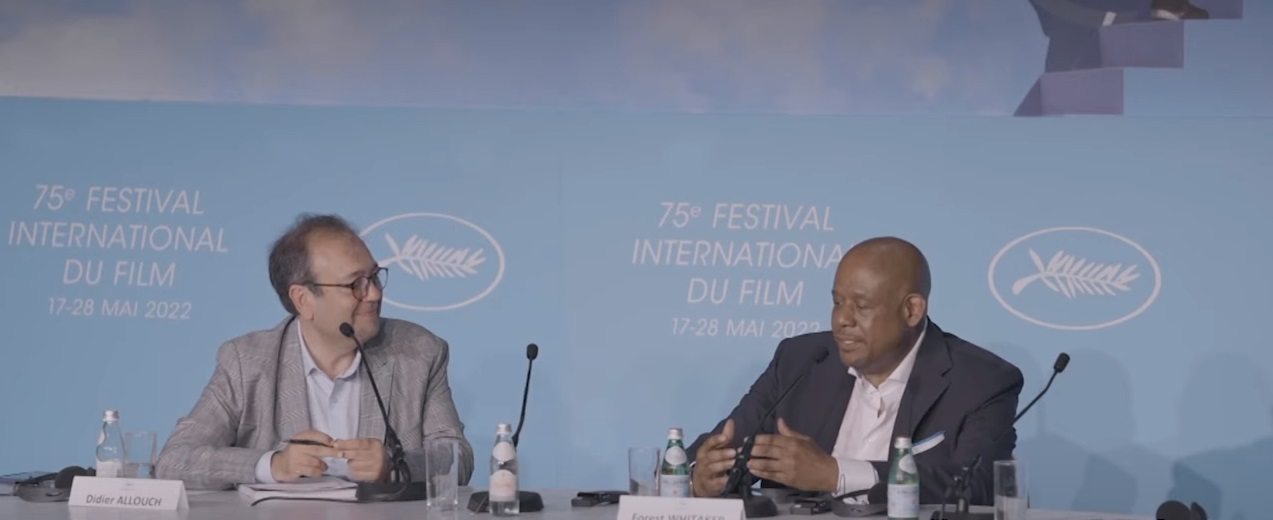
Didier Allouch and Whitaker at the Cannes Film Festival in 2022

Whitaker reprised his Rogue One role of Saw Gerrera in the 2019 video game Star Wars: Jedi Fallen Order, as well as in the Disney+ series Andor which aired in 2022 (Season 1) and 2025 (Season 2). Since 2019, Whitaker has been starring as Bumpy Johnson in Godfather of Harlem, a series on EPIX which explores the intersection between the criminal underworld and civil rights movement in the 1960s. In 2020, Whitaker starred as Jeronicus Jangle in the Netflix Christmas musical Jingle Jangle: A Christmas Journey. He appeared as Reverend C. L. Franklin, the father of Aretha Franklin (played by Jennifer Hudson) in the film Respect, and alongside Tom Hardy in Havoc. In 2023, Whitaker portrayed boxing trainer Doc Broadus in Big George Foreman., and appeared in an episode of Extrapolations, an Apple TV anthology series that focuses on climate change. In 2024, he appeared in the MGM+ series adaptation of Stephen L. Carter's novel The Emperor of Ocean Park. He was originally set to appear in Francis Ford Coppola's project Megalopolis but turned down the offer and his role was given to Laurence Fishburne.

== Production companies ==
=== Spirit Dance Entertainment ===
He produced numerous projects through his production company, Spirit Dance Entertainment, which he shut down in 2005 to concentrate on his acting career.

=== Significant Productions ===
Whitaker's current company, Significant Productions, is devoted to creating opportunities for underrepresented narratives and storytellers by championing films and television shows starring people of color, alongside diversified representation behind the camera. Whitaker and his partner Nina Yang Bongiovi produced Ryan Coogler's directorial debut Fruitvale Station, which won the Grand Jury Prize and the Audience Award for U.S. dramatic film at the 2013 Sundance Film Festival, and won Prize of the Future at Cannes. They also launched the career of Chloé Zhao, with Songs My Brothers Taught Me (2015). Other producing highlights have included Repentance (2013), Dope (2015), Roxanne Roxanne (2017) and Sorry to Bother You (2018). In 2021, the company's latest film, Passing, debuted on Netflix.

Significant Productions also produced a documentary that was shot in the hospice at Angola prison in Louisiana, Serving Life (2011), which was produced for Oprah Winfrey as the first commission for OWN and Oprah's Doc Club. They produced A Kid from Coney Island, a documentary about basketball star Stephon Marbury. In 2020, Significant produced By Whatever Means Necessary: The Times of Godfather of Harlem.

=== JuntoBox Films ===
Whitaker has played an active role as co-chair of JuntoBox Films since his initial involvement as co-chair with the collaborative film studio starting in March 2012. JuntoBox was developed as a social-media platform for filmmakers and fans to share ideas to create films and then collaborate to make them. Since Whitaker joined as co-chair, five projects have been greenlit for production.

== Music producer ==
Whitaker worked closely with Babyface as the executive producer to the soundtrack for Waiting to Exhale, which Whitaker directed. The album received a total of eleven Grammy nominations in 1997, including Album of the Year and Song of the Year for "Exhale (Shoop Shoop)". Three songs were nominated for Best Female R&B Vocal Performance. It won the Grammy for Best R&B Song for "Exhale (Shoop Shoop)", written by Babyface. Whitaker was executive soundtrack producer on the soundtrack for Hope Floats, which he directed. Best known for Garth Brooks' rendition of "To Make You Feel My Love", the album went double-platinum and was Grammy-nominated. Whitaker also was executive music producer and co-wrote eight songs for the soundtrack to First Daughter, which he directed. He also appears in the music video "In the Dark" by Bring Me the Horizon, released on October 21, 2019.

== Activism ==
=== Charity work ===
Over the past decade, Whitaker has spent much of his time dedicated to humanitarian work. These pursuits were partially motivated by a core lesson his mother taught him: "You don't have to believe what I believe, but you have to believe in something," which Whitaker has discussed giving structure to much of his life.

He founded the Whitaker Peace & Development Initiative (WPDI), a non-governmental organization, in 2012. WPDI implements peace-building programs in conflict affected communities throughout the world, which are focused on training youths in conflict resolution and developing businesses in areas of conflict. WPDI's programs are currently operating throughout Africa, Mexico, and the United States.

Whitaker was inducted as a UNESCO Goodwill Ambassador for Peace and Reconciliation, in a ceremony at UNESCO headquarters on June 21, 2011. As Goodwill Ambassador, Whitaker worked with UNESCO to support and develop initiatives that empower youths and keep them from entering or remaining in cycles of violence. At the induction ceremony, U.S. Ambassador to UNESCO David Killion described Whitaker as a "perfect choice as a Goodwill Ambassador... he has exemplified compassion in every area of his life, with humility and grace. He does this because it's the right thing to do." Following his increased work in conflict-impacted regions, Whitaker was then promoted to a UNESCO Special Envoy for Peace and Reconciliation, and was a member of President Obama's Committee on the Arts and the Humanities. He previously served on President Obama's Urban Policy Committee and started collaborating with the Office of the Special Representative of the UN Secretary-General for Children and Armed Conflict as an Advocate for Children Affected by War, a topic on which he was invited to speak before the UN Security Council in September 2014. Whitaker worked with elementary schools through the Turnaround Arts organization. Additionally, he is on the steering committee for the UN's work with the Reintegration of Child Soldiers after having been an Advocate for Children Affected by War, and is an Advocate for the United Nations Sustainable Development Goals.

He is also a supporter and public advocate for Hope North, a boarding school and vocational training center in northern Uganda for escaped child soldiers, orphans, and other young victims of the country's civil war.

Above all, Whitaker believes that ordinary people can and must come together to change the world. In his own words, "Even a seemingly small action can cause ripples that make an enormous impact."

=== Politics ===
In politics, Whitaker supported and spoke on behalf of Senator Barack Obama in his 2008 presidential campaign. On April 6, 2009, he was given a chieftaincy title in Imo State, Nigeria. Whitaker, who was named a chief among the Igbo community of Nkwerre, was given the title Nwannedinamba of Nkwerre, which means A Brother in a Foreign Land.

Whitaker co-founded the International Institute for Peace (IIP) at Rutgers University in Newark, New Jersey, where he is also a senior research scholar. Launched during the international Newark Peace Education Summit, IIP's mission is to develop programs and strategic partnerships to address issues such as increasing citizen security through community-building; the role of women and spiritual and religious leaders in peacebuilding; the impact of climate change; and the reduction of poverty. IIP operates under the auspices of UNESCO.

== Personal life ==
In 1996, Whitaker married actress Keisha Nash (1972–2023), whom he met on the set of Blown Away. As a couple, they had two daughters together (their daughter True Whitaker now works as an actress), along with his son and her daughter from previous relationships. In December 2018, Whitaker filed for divorce from Nash, citing irreconcilable differences.

Whitaker studies yoga, has a black belt in kenpō and is a vegetarian. He also trains in eskrima, originally under Dan Inosanto and currently with Joe Jackson. In 2021, it was announced that he had joined NBA Africa as a minority owner and strategic investor.

Whitaker's left eye ptosis has been called "intriguing" by the critic Susan Wloszczyna, with the writer Stephanie Zacharek maintaining that it gives him "a sleepy, contemplative look". Whitaker has explained that the condition is hereditary and that he has considered having surgery to correct it, not for cosmetic reasons but because it affects his vision.

His ancestry has been traced to Nkwerre in Imo State of Nigeria, where he was made an honorary titled chief on April 5, 2009.

== Acting credits and accolades ==
In addition to the numerous awards Whitaker won for his performance in The Last King of Scotland, he has also received several other honors. In 2005, the Deauville (France) Festival of American Film paid tribute to him. In September 2006, the 10th Annual Hollywood Film Festival presented him with its "Hollywood Actor of the Year Award", calling him "one of Hollywood's most accomplished actors". Whitaker received the Capri Legend Award in 2006, from the Capri Hollywood International Film Festival. He was honored at the Santa Barbara International Film Festival 2007, where he received the American Riviera Award. On April 16, 2007, Whitaker was the recipient of the 2,335th star on the Hollywood Walk of Fame for his contributions to the motion pictures industry at 6801 Hollywood Boulevard.

In 2004, Whitaker received an Honorary Doctorate from the North Carolina School of the Arts. In 2007, he received the Cinema for Peace Award for his ongoing advocacy for child soldiers and his work with inner-city youths. Whitaker then received the honorary degree of Doctor of Humane Letters from Xavier University of Louisiana in 2009 at the 82nd Commencement Ceremony. In 2009, he also received an Honorary Degree from Manhattanville College, where he delivered the commencement address. In 2012, in recognition of his contributions to the values embodied by the UN, he received the United Nations Correspondents Association's Advocate of the Year Award. In 2013, Whitaker received the Chevalier de l'ordre des Arts et des Lettres from France's Minister of Culture, in recognition of his work serving those affected by conflicts and violence. That year, he was also named a Martin Luther King, Jr. Fellow by Boston University. Whitaker was the keynote speaker at Miami University's commencement in 2014. He received the honorary degree of Doctor of Humane Letters from California State University, Dominguez Hills on May 16, 2015. In 2016, Whitaker received the Humanitarian Award from the World Childhood Foundation.

In 2017, Whitaker earned the Crystal Award at the World Economic Forum in Davos. That year, he also received the 4GameChanger Of The Year Award. He received the honorary degree of Doctor of Fine Arts from University of Southern California on May 11, 2018, at the 135th Commencement Ceremony. He received the Medal of Peace from the University of San Diego's Kroc School of Peace Studies in 2018, and received an Honorary Fellowship from SOAS University of London that same year. In 2019, he was also among the recipients of the 2019 Kennedy Center Award for the Human Spirit. In 2021, USC awarded him the Robert Redford Award for Engaged Artists. That year, he was also promoted to Commander of France's Order of Arts and Letters. In 2021, Whitaker also received an honorary German Sustainability Award. In 2022, he was awarded the International Peace Honors prize for his philanthropy and humanitarian service, as well as the SDG Vanguard Award by the UN Foundation, for his innovative championing of sustainability and resilience across a wide array of countries. He also received the Honorary Palme d'Or from the Cannes Film Festival.
