= Repentance (2013 film) =

- Theatrical release poster
- Directed by: Philippe Caland
- Screenplay by: Philippe Caland; Shintaro Shimosawa; Yusuf Hassan
- Produced by: Philippe Caland; Nina Yang Bongiovi; Forest Whitaker
- Starring: Forest Whitaker; Anthony Mackie; Mike Epps; Nicole Ari Parker; Sanaa Lathan
- Cinematography: Denis Maloney
- Edited by: Rick Shaine; Lee Haugen
- Music by: Mark Kilian
- Production companies: Codeblack Films; JuntoBox Films
- Distributed by: Lionsgate
- Release dates: January 20, 2013 (Slamdance Film Festival); February 28, 2014 (U.S.)
- Running time: 95 minutes
- Country: United States
- Language: English
- Box office: $1,189,612

Repentance is a 2013 American psychological horror film written and directed by Philippe Caland, co-written by Shintaro Shimosawa and Yusuf Hassan and starring Forest Whitaker, Anthony Mackie, Mike Epps, Nicole Ari Parker and Sanaa Lathan. Repentance is the first major film production of CodeBlack Films since CodeBlack's merger with Lions Gate Entertainment in May 2012. The film had its limited release in US theaters on February 28, 2014.

== Plot summary ==
Years after a drunken car crash that almost took his life, Tommy Carter (Mackie) has reinvented himself as a therapist/spiritual advisor who advocates a synthesis of world religions and positivity. He has parlayed this vocation into a successful book release that one day draws the attention of Angel Sanchez (Whitaker), a profoundly troubled man fixated on the "untimely" death of his mother. When Carter takes on Sanchez as a personal client in an effort to raise funds for his indebted brother Ben (Epps), things quickly take a turn for the worse. Angel needs much more than a simple life coach. Plagued by visions of his dead mother, a seance is held by Carter in order for Angel to say goodbye to his mother at which point he suffers a mild breakdown. Subsequently, Carter informs Angel that he can no longer treat him. Angel then incapacitates and captures Carter torturing him over the course of days- to confess his sins so to speak. After capturing Carter's wife and brother it is revealed that it was the brothers who accidentally ran over Angel's mother the night of their accident. Ben then threw her, still alive and crying out for help over a bridge to her death. Upon this revelation Angel untapes Carter, leaving him his gun and walks out. As he walks away from his home with his daughter he sees his smiling mother looking down on him and a gunshot rings out, as Carter narrates that both brothers souls are tainted from what happened with them and Angel's mother that night.

== Cast ==
- Forest Whitaker as Angel Sanchez
- Anthony Mackie as Tommy Carter
- Mike Epps as Ben Carter
- Nicole Ari Parker as Sophie Sanchez
- Sanaa Lathan as Maggie Carter
- Peter Weller as Meyer
- Adella Gautier as Marina Sanchez, Angel's Mother

== Release ==
Repentance opened on February 28, 2014, in limited release. The film's opening weekend gross was $501,290 in 152 North American theaters (a per theater average of $3,298). The film remained in theaters in limited release for 4 weeks, earning $1,189,612 in its entire run. Repentance was available on Digital HD and Video on Demand on June 10, 2014, and was released on Blu-ray and DVD on June 24, 2014.

== Reception ==
Repentance was poorly received by critics. On the review aggregator website Rotten Tomatoes, 33% of six critics' reviews are positive, with an average rating of 3.2/10.
