= 51st NAACP Image Awards =

American entertainment awards for 2019 works

- Date: February 22, 2020
- Site: Pasadena Civic Auditorium, Pasadena, California
- Official website: NAACPImageAwards.net

Television coverage
- Network: BET; BET Her; CMT; Comedy Central; Logo; MTV; MTV2; Pop; Smithsonian Channel; TV Land; VH1 (simulcast)

The 51st NAACP Image Awards, presented by the NAACP, honored outstanding representations and achievements of people of color in motion pictures, television, music, and literature during the 2019 calendar year. The ceremony took place on February 22, 2020, at the Pasadena Civic Auditorium and was broadcast for the first time on BET - as well as simulcast on several of its sister ViacomCBS (now Paramount) networks, moving to the former after broadcasts on TV One in past years.

During the ceremony, Caribbean billionaire/singer Rihanna was awarded with the President's Award for "her fundraising efforts with various charities, disaster relief and education abroad—efforts", and John Lewis was awarded with the Chairman's Award "in recognition of his lifelong dedication of protecting human rights and securing civil liberties".

All nominees are listed below, and the winners are listed in bold.

== Special awards ==
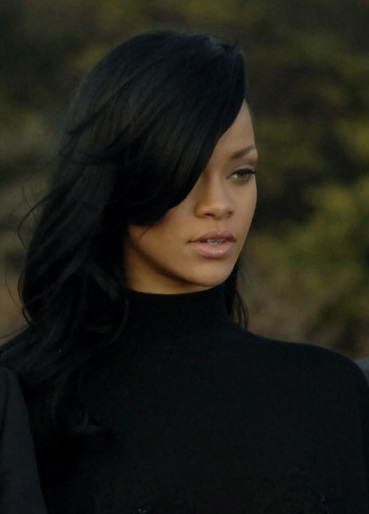
Rihanna was honored with the President's Award

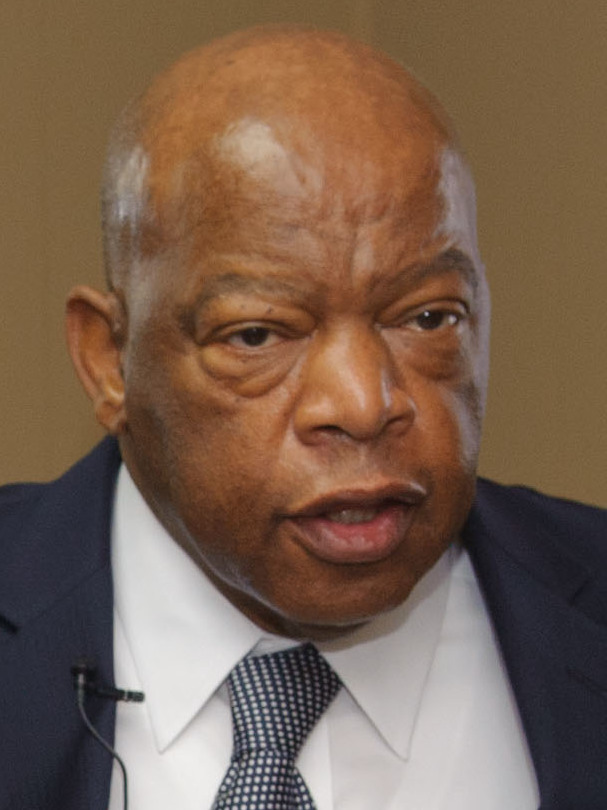
John Lewis was honored with the Chairman's Award

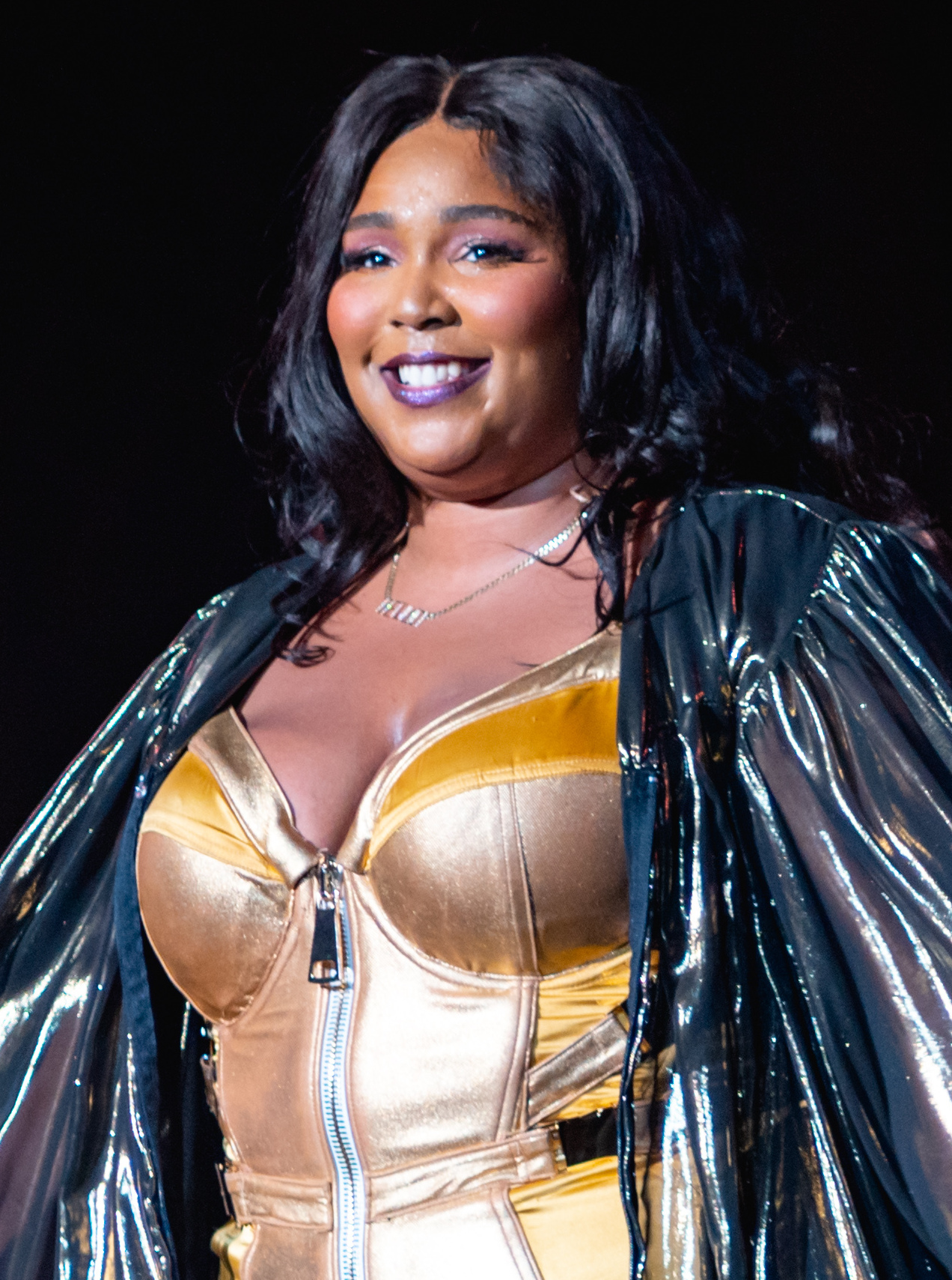
Lizzo was honored with the Entertainer of the Year Award

President's Award
- **Rihanna**
Chairman's Award
- **John Lewis**
Key of Life Award
- **Brig Gen Charles E. McGee**
Entertainer of the Year
- **Lizzo**
- Angela Bassett
- Billy Porter
- Regina King
- Tyler Perry
Activist of the Year
- **Teresa Haley**

== Motion Picture ==
**Outstanding Motion Picture**: **Just Mercy**; Dolemite Is My Name; Harriet; Queen & Slim; Us	**Outstanding Directing in a Motion Picture**: **Chiwetel Ejiofor – The Boy Who Harnessed the Wind**; Mati Diop – Atlantics; Reginald Hudlin – The Black Godfather; Kasi Lemmons – Harriet; Jordan Peele – Us
**Outstanding Directing in a Motion Picture (Television)**: **Rashid Johnson – Native Son**; Codie Elaine Oliver – Black Love; Janice Cooke – I Am Somebody's Child: The Regina Louise Story; Kenny Leon – American Son; Russ Parr – The Bobby Debarge Story	**Outstanding Writing in a Motion Picture (Television)**: **Suzan-Lori Parks – Native Son**; Cas Sigers-Beedles – Twas the Chaos Before Christmas; Melissa Bustamante – A Christmas Winter Song; Patrik-Ian Polk – Being Mary Jane; Yvette Nicole Brown – Always a Bridesmaid
**Outstanding Actor in a Motion Picture**: **Michael B. Jordan – Just Mercy**; Chadwick Boseman – 21 Bridges; Winston Duke – Us; Daniel Kaluuya – Queen & Slim; Eddie Murphy – Dolemite Is My Name	**Outstanding Actress in a Motion Picture**: **Lupita Nyong'o – Us**; Cynthia Erivo – Harriet; Naomie Harris – Black and Blue; Jodie Turner-Smith – Queen & Slim; Alfre Woodard – Clemency
**Outstanding Supporting Actor in a Motion Picture**: **Jamie Foxx – Just Mercy**; Sterling K. Brown – Waves; Tituss Burgess – Dolemite Is My Name; Leslie Odom Jr. – Harriet; Wesley Snipes – Dolemite Is My Name	**Outstanding Supporting Actress in a Motion Picture**: **Marsai Martin – Little**; Jennifer Lopez – Hustlers; Janelle Monáe – Harriet; Da'Vine Joy Randolph – Dolemite Is My Name; Octavia Spencer – Luce
**Outstanding Writing in a Motion Picture**: **Jordan Peele – Us**; Doug Atchison – Brian Banks; Chinonye Chukwu – Clemency; Destin Daniel Cretton – Just Mercy; Kasi Lemmons – Harriet	**Outstanding Independent Motion Picture**: **Dolemite Is My Name**; Clemency; Luce; Queen & Slim; The Boy Who Harnessed the Wind
**Outstanding Breakthrough Role in a Motion Picture**: **Marsai Martin – Little**; Cynthia Erivo – Harriet; Shahadi Wright Joseph – Us; Rob Morgan – Just Mercy; Jodie Turner-Smith – Queen & Slim	**Outstanding Ensemble Cast in a Motion Picture**: **Just Mercy**; Dolemite Is My Name; Harriet; Queen & Slim; Us

== Television ==
Best Series
Outstanding Drama Series	Outstanding Comedy Series
**Greenleaf**; Godfather of Harlem; Queen Sugar; The Chi; Watchmen	**Black-ish**; Ballers; Dear White People; Grown-ish; The Neighborhood
Outstanding Television Movie, Limited-Series or Dramatic Special	Outstanding Children’s Program
**When They See Us**; American Son; Being Mary Jane; Native Son; True Detective	**Family Reunion**; Doc McStuffins; Kevin Hart's Guide to Black History; Marvel's Avengers: Black Panther's Quest; Motown Magic
Best Acting in a Drama Series
Outstanding Actor in a Drama Series	Outstanding Actress in a Drama Series
**Omari Hardwick – Power**; Sterling K. Brown – This Is Us; Billy Porter – Pose; Kofi Siriboe – Queen Sugar; Forest Whitaker – Godfather of Harlem	**Angela Bassett – 9-1-1**; Viola Davis – How to Get Away with Murder; Regina King – Watchmen; Simone Missick – All Rise; Rutina Wesley – Queen Sugar
Outstanding Supporting Actor in a Drama Series	Outstanding Supporting Actress in a Drama Series
**Harold Perrineau – Claws**; Giancarlo Esposito – Godfather of Harlem; Delroy Lindo – The Good Fight; Wendell Pierce – Tom Clancy's Jack Ryan; Nigél Thatch – Godfather of Harlem	**Lynn Whitfield – Greenleaf**; Tina Lifford – Queen Sugar; CCH Pounder – NCIS: New Orleans; Lyric Ross – This Is Us; Susan Kelechi Watson – This Is us
Best Acting in a Comedy Series
Outstanding Actor in a Comedy Series	Outstanding Actress in a Comedy Series
**Anthony Anderson – Black-ish**; Cedric the Entertainer – The Neighborhood; Don Cheadle – Black Monday; Dwayne Johnson – Ballers; Tracy Morgan – The Last O.G.	**Tracee Ellis Ross – Black-ish**; Logan Browning – Dear White People; Tiffany Haddish – The Last O.G.; Jill Scott – First Wives Club; Yara Shahidi – Grown-ish
Outstanding Supporting Actor in a Comedy Series	Outstanding Supporting Actress in a Comedy Series
**Deon Cole – Black-ish**; Andre Braugher – Brooklyn Nine-Nine; Tituss Burgess – Unbreakable Kimmy Schmidt; Terry Crews – Brooklyn Nine-Nine; Laurence Fishburne – Black-ish	**Marsai Martin – Black-ish**; Tichina Arnold – The Neighborhood; Halle Bailey – Grown-ish; Loretta Devine – Family Reunion; Regina Hall – Black Monday
Best Acting in a Movie/Limited Series
Outstanding Actor in a Television Movie, Limited-Series or Dramatic Special	Outstanding Actress in a Television Movie, Limited-Series or Dramatic Special
**Jharrel Jerome – When They See Us**; Mahershala Ali – True Detective; Idris Elba – Luther; Caleel Harris – When They See Us; Ethan Henry Herisse – When They See Us	**Niecy Nash – When They See Us**; Aunjanue Ellis – When They See Us; Octavia Spencer – Truth Be Told; Gabrielle Union – Being Mary Jane; Kerry Washington – American Son
Outstanding Performance by a Youth (Series, Special, Television Movie or Limited Series)
**Marsai Martin – Black-ish**; Miles Brown – Black-ish; Lonnie Chavis – This Is Us; Caleel Harris – When They See Us; Lyric Ross – This Is Us
Best Acting Overall
Outstanding Guest Actor or Actress in a Television Series
**Kelly Rowland – American Soul**; David Alan Grier – Queen Sugar; Sanaa Lathan – The Affair; MAJOR. – Star; Blair Underwood – Dear White People
Reality & Variety
Outstanding Talk Series	Outstanding Reality Program, Reality Competition Series or Game Show
**Red Table Talk**; The Daily Show with Trevor Noah; The Real; The Shop: Uninteruppted; The Tamron Hall Show	**Rhythm + Flow**; Iyanla: Fix My Life; Lip Sync Battle; Sunday Best; The Voice
Outstanding News / Information – (Series or Special)	Outstanding Host in a Talk or News / Information (Series or Special)
**Unsung**; Pushout: The Criminalization of Black Girls in Schools; Surviving R. Kelly; The Breakfast Club; The Story of God with Morgan Freeman	**Jada Pinkett Smith – Red Table Talk**; Whoopi Goldberg, Joy Behar, Sunny Hostin, Meghan McCain, Abby Huntsman, and Ana Navarro – The View; Lester Holt – NBC Nightly News with Lester Holt; Trevor Noah – The Daily Show with Trevor Noah; Angela Rye – Young Gifted and Broke: A BET Town Hall
Outstanding Variety (Series or Special)	Outstanding Host in a Reality, Game Show or Variety (Series or Special)
**Homecoming: A Film by Beyoncé**; Black Girls Rock! 2019; Dave Chappelle: Sticks & Stones; Saturday Night Live; Wanda Sykes: Not Normal	**Steve Harvey – Celebrity Family Feud**; Wayne Brady – Let's Make a Deal; Regina Hall – 2019 BET Awards; LL Cool J – Lip Sync Battle; Iyanla Vanzant – Iyanla: Fix My Life

== Recording ==
=== Outstanding New Artist ===
- **Lil Nas X**
  - Ari Lennox
  - Lucky Daye
  - Mahalia
  - Mykal Kilgore

=== Outstanding Male Artist ===
- **Bruno Mars**
  - Khalid
  - Lil Nas X
  - MAJOR.
  - PJ Morton

=== Outstanding Female Artist ===
- **Beyoncé**
  - Fantasia
  - H.E.R.
  - India.Arie
  - Lizzo

=== Outstanding Duo, Group or Collaboration ===
- **Blue Ivy, Saint Jhn, Beyoncé & Wizkid – "Brown Skin Girl"**
  - Chris Brown feat. Drake – "No Guidance"
  - PJ Morton feat. JoJo – "Say So"
  - Ari Lennox & J. Cole – "Shea Butter Baby"
  - Alicia Keys & Miguel – "Show Me Love"

=== Outstanding Jazz Album ===
- **Jazzmeia Horn – Love & Liberation"**
  - David Sánchez – Carib
  - Najee – Center of the Heart
  - Nathan Mitchell – SoulMate
  - Vanessa Rubin – The Dream Is You: Vanessa Rubin Sings Tadd Dameron

=== Outstanding Gospel/Christian Song – Traditional or Contemporary ===
- **Kirk Franklin – Love Theory"**
  - John P. Kee feat. Zacardi Cortez – I Made It Out
  - BeBe Winans feat. Korean Soul – Laughter
  - Donnie McClurkin – Not Yet
  - The Clark Sisters – Victory

=== Outstanding Music Video ===
- **Lizzo – "Juice**"
  - H.E.R. – "Hard Place"
  - Chris Brown feat. Drake – "No Guidance"
  - India Arie – "Steady Love"
  - Khalid – "Talk"

=== Outstanding Song, Traditional ===
- **Beyoncé – "Spirit"**
  - Fantasia – "Enough"
  - Lizzo – "Jerome"
  - Cynthia Erivo – "Stand Up"
  - India Arie – "Steady Love"

=== Outstanding Song, Contemporary ===
- **Beyoncé – "Before I Let Go"**
  - H.E.R. – "Hard Place"
  - Lizzo – "Juice"
  - Normani – "Motivation"
  - Khalid – "Talk"

=== Outstanding Album ===
- **Beyoncé – Homecoming: The Live Album**
  - Lizzo – Cuz I Love You
  - H.E.R. – I Used to Know Her
  - Fantasia – Sketchbook
  - India Arie – Worthy

=== Outstanding Soundtrack/Compilation ===
- **Beyoncé & Various artists – The Lion King: The Gift**
  - Terence Blanchard – Harriet (Original Motion Picture Soundtrack)
  - Various artists – Queen & Slim: The Soundtrack
  - Various artists – The Lion King: Original Motion Picture Soundtrack
  - Michael Abels – Us (Original Motion Picture Soundtrack)
