= Godfather of Harlem =

American television series

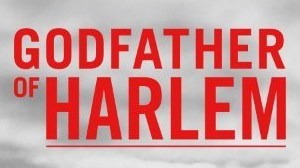
- Genre: Crime drama
- Created by: Chris Brancato; Paul Eckstein
- Starring: Forest Whitaker; Nigél Thatch; Ilfenesh Hadera; Lucy Fry; Kelvin Harrison Jr.; Rafi Gavron; Antoinette Crowe-Legacy; Giancarlo Esposito; Vincent D'Onofrio; Erik LaRay Harvey; Demi Singleton; Jason Alan Carvell; Michael Raymond-James
- Theme music composer: Mark Isham
- Opening theme: "Just In Case" by Swizz Beatz
- Country of origin: United States
- Original language: English
- No. of seasons: 4
- No. of episodes: 40

Production
- Executive producers: Chris Brancato; Paul Eckstein; Forest Whitaker; James Acheson; John Ridley; Markuann Smith; Michael Panes; Nina Yang Bongiovi
- Production location: New York City
- Camera setup: Single-camera
- Running time: 47–60 minutes
- Production companies: Chris Brancato Inc.; Significant Productions; 20th Television (Note: Credited as ABC Signature Studios for season 1 and ABC Signature for seasons 2 and 3)

Original release
- Network: Epix
- Release: September 29, 2019 – August 29, 2021
- Network: MGM+
- Release: January 15, 2023 – present

Godfather of Harlem is an American crime drama television series that premiered on September 29, 2019, on Epix. The series is created by Chris Brancato and Paul Eckstein, and stars Forest Whitaker as 1960s New York City gangster Bumpy Johnson. Whitaker is also executive producer alongside Nina Yang Bongiovi, James Acheson, John Ridley and Markuann Smith. Chris Brancato acts as showrunner. On February 12, 2020, the series was renewed for a second season, which premiered on April 18, 2021. On January 13, 2022, the series was renewed for a third season, which premiered on January 15, 2023, on the rebranded MGM+. On November 29, 2023, the series was renewed for a fourth season, which premiered on April 13, 2025. In July 2026, the series was renewed for a final two-hour episode that will serve as the series finale.

The television documentary series By Whatever Means Necessary: The Times of Godfather of Harlem premiered on November 8, 2020.

== Premise ==
Godfather of Harlem tells the fictionalized story of infamous crime boss Bumpy Johnson, "who in the early 1960s returned from ten years in prison to find the neighborhood he once ruled in shambles. With the streets controlled by the Italian mob, Bumpy must take on the Genovese crime family to regain control. During the battle, he forms an alliance with Muslim minister Malcolm X, catching Malcolm's political rise in the cross-hairs of social upheaval and a mob war that threatens to tear the city apart."

== Cast and characters ==
=== Main ===
- Forest Whitaker as Ellsworth Raymond "Bumpy" Johnson, a Harlem-based mob boss and the titular "Godfather of Harlem"
- Nigél Thatch (seasons 1–2) and Jason Alan Carvell (season 3; guest season 4) as Malcolm X, a Muslim minister in the Nation of Islam and civil rights activist
- Ilfenesh Hadera as Mayme Hatcher Johnson, Bumpy's wife
- Lucy Fry as Stella Gigante, Vincent's rebellious daughter
- Kelvin Harrison Jr. as Teddy Greene (season 1), an aspiring musician and Stella's boyfriend
- Rafi Gavron as Ernie Nunzi (seasons 1–2), a violent associate of Vincent's and a high-ranking member of the Genovese crime family, one of the Five Families
- Antoinette Crowe-Legacy as Elise Johnson, Bumpy's heroin-addicted daughter-turned Muslim
- Giancarlo Esposito as Adam Clayton Powell Jr. (season 1; recurring seasons 2–3), a politician who represents Harlem in Congress
- Vincent D'Onofrio as Vincent "Chin" Gigante (seasons 1–2; guest seasons 3–4), the mob boss of the Genovese crime family and Bumpy's main rival
- Erik LaRay Harvey as Del Chance (seasons 2–4; recurring season 1), one of Bumpy's most trusted enforcers
- Demi Singleton as Margaret Johnson (season 2; recurring seasons 1, 4; guest season 3), Bumpy's granddaughter
- Michael Raymond-James as Joseph Colombo (season 4; recurring season 3), the mob boss of the Colombo crime family, one of the Five Families

=== Recurring ===
- Paul Sorvino as Frank Costello (seasons 1–2)
- Luis Guzmán as Alejandro "El Guapo" Villabuena (season 1)
- Elvis Nolasco as Nat Pettigrew
- Roslyn Ruff as Delia Greene (seasons 1–2, 4; guest season 3)
- Rony Clanton as Cecil Bradley (seasons 1–2; guest season 4)
- Markuann Smith as Junie Byrd
- Dominic Fumusa as Father Louis Gigante (seasons 1–3)
- Tramell Tillman as Bobby Robinson (season 1)
- Afi Bijou as Sister Marny (seasons 1–2; guest season 3)
- Korey Jackson as Roy Livingston Wingate (seasons 1–3)
- Chazz Palminteri as Joseph Bonanno (seasons 1–2; guest season 4)
- Kevin Corrigan as Venero Frank "Bennie Eggs" Mangano (season 1; guest season 2)
- Joanne Kelly as Amy Vanderbilt (season 1; guest season 2)
- Patricia R. Floyd as Esther James (season 1; guest season 2)
- Clifton Davis as Honorable Elijah Muhammad (seasons 1–2)
- Kathrine Narducci as Olympia Gigante (seasons 1–3; guest season 4)
- Peter Francis James as Archie Gaines (seasons 2–3; guest season 1)
- Leopold Manswell as Captain Henry (season 2; guest season 1)
- Method Man as Sam Christian (season 2)
- Ronald Guttman as Jean Jehan (season 2)
- Isaach de Bankolé as Jean Cesar / Monsieur 98 (season 2; guest season 3)
- Grace Porter as Betty Shabazz (seasons 2–3; guest season 4)
- Gino Cafarelli as Fat Gino (season 2)
- Justin Bartha as Robert Morgenthau (season 2; guest season 3)
- Maurice Jones as Captain Omar Jones (seasons 2–4)
- Bo Dietl as Tommy Lucchese (seasons 3–4; guest seasons 1–2)
- Richard Topol as Jonah Fineman (season 3; guest seasons 2, 4)
- Louis Vanaria as Lombardi (season 3; guest season 2)
- Arthur J. Nascarella as Carlo Gambino (seasons 3–4)
- Richard D'Alessandro as Gaspar DiGregorio (season 3; guest season 4)
- Yul Vazquez as José Battle (season 3)
- Hudson Oz as Jonathan Pike (season 3; guest season 4)
- Joel Marsh Garland as William "Wild Bill" Harvey (season 3)
- Whoopi Goldberg as Miss Willa (season 4; guest seasons 2–3)
- Erik Palladino as Pino Greco (season 4)
- Dean Imperial as Vinnie (season 4)
- Rome Flynn as Frank Lucas (season 4)
- Liv Symone as Monique (season 4)
- Willie C. Carpenter as Marshall Grant (season 4)
- Susannah Schulman Rogers as Alice Bradshaw (season 4)
- Michael Benjamin Washington as James Baldwin (season 4)
- Devin Kessler as Afeni Shakur (season 4)
- Kyle Vincent Terry as Sadiq (season 4)
- Siddiq Saunderson as Maurice (season 4)
- Elijah Wright as Jerome Greene (season 4)

=== Guest ===
- Louis Cancelmi as Richie Zambrano (season 1)
- Jazmine Sullivan as Mary Wells (season 1)
- Nick Chinlund as Gary D'Alessandro (seasons 1, 3)
- John Hopkins as Detective Ryan Clark (season 1)
- Billy Wirth as Detective Kramer (season 1)
- Aloe Blacc as Lionel (season 1)
- Geoffrey Blake as Kenneth O'Donnell (season 1)
- Patrick Murney as Sergeant Christopher Hollis (season 1)
- Deric Augustine as Cassius Marcellus Clay / Muhammad Ali (seasons 1–2, 4)
- Kim Brockington as Lillian Gaines (seasons 1, 3)
- Sean Allan Krill as Lester Wolff (season 1)
- Steve Vinovich as Senator John McClellan (seasons 1–2)
- Richard Petrocelli as Joseph Valachi (season 1)
- Brian Hutchison as George Lincoln Rockwell (season 1)
- Sonja Sohn as Nell (season 1)
- Samm Henshaw as Sam Cooke (season 1)
- Ivo Nandi as The Zip (season 1)
- Annabella Sciorra as Fay Bonanno (season 2)
- James Madio as Angelo Dundee (season 2)
- Michael Rispoli as Joseph Magliocco (season 2)
- Marc C. Donovan as Mike Wallace (season 2)
- Ralph Brown as President Lyndon B. Johnson (seasons 2–3)
- True Whitaker as Sister Sandra (seasons 2–4)
- Evander Duck Jr. as Brother Clinkscale (seasons 2–4)
- Michael Early as Brother Dayton (seasons 2–4)
- A$AP Ferg as Reggie (season 2)
- Frank Wood as Dr. Omar Azzam (season 3)
- Al Vicente as Juan Madera (season 3)
- Arturo Del Puerto as Che Guevara (season 3)
- Derrick Williams as Captain Reggie Fields (season 3)
- Katya Martín as Marina (season 3)
- Bowman Wright as Alex Haley (season 3)
- J.D. Mollison as Andrew Young (season 3)
- Neil Dawson as Cyril deGrasse Tyson (seasons 3–4)
- Ian Lithgow as Fred Straub (season 4)
- James Joseph O'Neil as Sergeant Dolan (season 4)
- Brian Scolaro as Mickey Campanella (season 4)
- Sedly Bloomfield as Moses (season 4)
- Fat Joe as Slim Lou (season 4)
- Steven Boyer as Truman Capote (season 4)
- Conor Ryan as Roy Halston Frowick (season 4)
- Tony DeSare as Frank Sinatra (season 4)

== Episodes ==
Season	Episodes	Originally released		
Season	Episodes	First released	Last released	Network
1	10	September 29, 2019	December 1, 2019	Epix
2	10	April 18, 2021	August 29, 2021	Epix
3	10	January 15, 2023	March 26, 2023	MGM+
4	10	April 13, 2025	June 22, 2025	MGM+

=== Season 1 (2019) ===
No. overall	No. in season	Title	Directed by	Written by	Original release date
1	1	"By Whatever Means Necessary"	John Ridley	Chris Brancato & Paul Eckstein	September 29, 2019
2	2	"The Nitty Gritty"	Joe Chappelle	Chris Brancato	October 6, 2019
3	3	"Our Day Will Come"	Joe Chappelle	Paul Eckstein	October 13, 2019
4	4	"I Am the Greatest"	Guillermo Navarro	Chris Brancato	October 20, 2019
5	5	"It's All in the Game"	Guillermo Navarro	Lawrence Andries	October 27, 2019
6	6	"Il Canto de Malavita"	Tanya Hamilton	Chris Brancato	November 3, 2019
7	7	"Masters of War"	Tanya Hamilton	Zach Calig	November 10, 2019
8	8	"How I Got Over"	Ernest R. Dickerson	Resheida Brady & Mosie Verneau	November 17, 2019
9	9	"Rent Strike Blues"	Ernest R. Dickerson	Chris Brancato & Michael Panes	November 24, 2019
10	10	"Chickens Come Home to Roost"	Joe Chappelle	Chris Brancato	December 1, 2019

=== Season 2 (2021) ===
No. overall	No. in season	Title	Directed by	Written by	Original release date
11	1	"The French Connection"	Joe Chappelle	Chris Brancato	April 18, 2021
12	2	"Sting Like a Bee"	Guillermo Navarro	Chris Brancato & Michael Panes	April 25, 2021
13	3	"The Fruit Stand Riot"	Guillermo Navarro	Chris Brancato & Paul Eckstein	May 2, 2021
14	4	"The Geechee"	Joe Chappelle	Heather Mitchell, Chris Brancato & Michael Panes	May 9, 2021
15	5	"It's a Small World After All"	Guillermo Navarro	Matthew Newman	May 16, 2021
16	6	"The Ballot or the Bullet"	Marisol Adler	Chris Brancato & Michael Panes	May 23, 2021
17	7	"Man of the Year"	Guillermo Navarro	Heather Mitchell, Chris Brancato & Michael Panes	August 8, 2021
18	8	"Ten Harlems"	Joe Chappelle	Resheida Brady & Zach Calig	August 15, 2021
19	9	"Bonanno Split"	Carl Seaton	Chris Brancato & Moise Verneau	August 22, 2021
20	10	"The Hate That Hate Produced"	Joe Chappelle	Chris Brancato & Michael Panes	August 29, 2021

=== Season 3 (2023) ===
No. overall	No. in season	Title	Directed by	Written by	Original release date
21	1	"The Negro in White America"	Joe Chappelle	Chris Brancato & Michael Panes	January 15, 2023
22	2	"Alzado"	Louis Patrick Emmanuels	Chris Brancato & Michael Panes	January 22, 2023
23	3	"Mecca"	Carl Seaton	Chris Brancato & Paul Eckstein	January 29, 2023
24	4	"Captain Fields"	Guillermo Navarro	Moises Verneau & Dean Imperial	February 5, 2023
25	5	"Angel of Death"	Lily Mariye	Chris Brancato & Michael Panes	February 19, 2023
26	6	"Spooks"	Guillermo Navarro	Dean Imperial & Angelica Cheri	February 26, 2023
27	7	"All Roads Lead to Malcolm"	Joe Chappelle	Chris Brancato & Michael Panes	March 5, 2023
28	8	"Homeland or Death"	Guillermo Navarro	Michael Panes & Dean Imperial	March 12, 2023
29	9	"We Are All Kings"	Rob Greenlea	Chris Brancato & Michael Panes	March 19, 2023
30	10	"Our Black Shining Prince"	Joe Chappelle	Chris Brancato & Michael Panes	March 26, 2023

=== Season 4 (2025) ===
No. overall	No. in season	Title	Directed by	Written by	Original release date
31	1	"New Harlem"	Guillermo Navarro	Stephen Schiff	April 13, 2025
32	2	"Country Boy"	Guillermo Navarro	Benjamin Cavell	April 20, 2025
33	3	"The Straw Man"	Lily Mariye	Tanya Barfield	April 27, 2025
34	4	"Union Blues"	Lily Mariye	Salvatore Stabile	May 4, 2025
35	5	"Concrete Jungle"	Rob J. Greenlea	Benjamin Cavell	May 11, 2025
36	6	"The Visit"	Rob J. Greenlea	Michael Panes	May 18, 2025
37	7	"The Pawn Goes First"	Carl Seaton	Tanya Barfield	June 1, 2025
38	8	"If We Must Die"	Carl Seaton	Stephen Schiff and Chris Brancato & Michael Panes	June 8, 2025
39	9	"Black and White"	Marisol Adler	Kyle Hamilton & Angelica Cheri	June 15, 2025
40	10	"Unity Day"	Marisol Adler	Chris Brancato & Michael Panes	June 22, 2025

== Production ==
=== Development ===
In October 2017, a prequel television series to the 2007 film American Gangster was confirmed to be in development, with Forest Whitaker attached to star as Ellsworth "Bumpy" Johnson. On April 25, 2018, it was announced that Epix had given the production a series order for a first season consisting of ten episodes. The series was written by Chris Brancato and Paul Eckstein who executive produces alongside Whitaker, Nina Yang Bongiovi, James Acheson, and Markuann Smith, with Brancato acting as the showrunner. Production companies involved with the series include ABC Signature Studios and Significant Productions.

On June 19, 2018, it was reported that John Ridley would direct the first episode of the series. The first season premiered on September 29, 2019.

On February 12, 2020, the series was renewed for a second season, which premiered on April 18, 2021.

On January 13, 2022, the series was renewed for a third season, which premiered on January 15, 2023.

On November 29, 2023, the series was renewed for a fourth season, which premiered on April 13, 2025.

On July 1, 2026, the series was renewed for a final two-hour episode that will serve as the series finale.

=== Casting ===
Alongside the initial series announcement, it was confirmed that Forest Whitaker would star in the series as Bumpy Johnson. In September 2018, it was announced that Vincent D'Onofrio, Ilfenesh Hadera, Antoinette Crowe-Legacy, Nigél Thatch, Kelvin Harrison Jr., Lucy Fry and Paul Sorvino had been cast in starring roles. In October 2018, it was reported that Giancarlo Esposito and Rafi Gavron had joined the cast in a series regular capacity. On January 8, 2019, it was announced that Kathrine Narducci had been cast in a recurring role.

In March 2021, Justin Bartha, Annabella Sciorra, Ronald Guttman, Isaach de Bankolé, Method Man, Michael Rispoli and Grace Porter were announced to have joined the cast for the second season. In May, Whoopi Goldberg was announced to appear in a guest role.

On July 25, 2022, Paul Sorvino died shortly before the third season began production.

In August 2024, Rome Flynn was announced to have joined the cast for the fourth season. In September, Michael Benjamin Washington and Elijah Wright were announced to have joined the cast.

=== Filming ===
Principal photography for the series reportedly began in September 2018 in New York City.

== Reception ==
=== Critical response ===
For the first season, the review aggregator website Rotten Tomatoes reported a 92% approval rating with an average rating of 7.50/10, based on 25 reviews. The website's critical consensus reads: "As sharply dressed as it is smartly written, Godfather of Harlem walks familiar blocks to its own beat and makes a strong first impression." Metacritic, which uses a weighted average, assigned the season a score of 72 out of 100, based on 10 critics, indicating "generally favorable reviews". Cheryl Kahla of The South African said: "The Godfather of Harlem is an excellent example of what modern television is capable of today. Whitaker's character Bumpy is a drug kingpin but also just a man trying to make sense of the world and connect with his family".

=== Accolades ===
Year	Award	Category	Nominee	Result	Ref.
2019	NAACP Image Awards	Outstanding Drama Series	Godfather of Harlem	Nominated	
2020	Black Reel Awards for Television	Outstanding Drama Series	Godfather of Harlem	Nominated	
2020	Black Reel Awards for Television	Outstanding Actor, Drama Series	Forest Whitaker	Nominated	
2020	Black Reel Awards for Television	Outstanding Supporting Actor, Drama Series	Giancarlo Esposito	Won	
2020	Black Reel Awards for Television	Outstanding Directing, Drama Series	John Ridley	Nominated	
2020	NAACP Image Awards	Outstanding Drama Series	Godfather of Harlem	Nominated	
2020	NAACP Image Awards	Outstanding Actor in a Drama Series	Forest Whitaker	Nominated	
2020	NAACP Image Awards	Outstanding Supporting Actor in a Drama Series	Giancarlo Esposito	Nominated	
2020	NAACP Image Awards	Outstanding Supporting Actor in a Drama Series	Nigel Thatch	Nominated	
2020	Primetime Emmy Awards	Outstanding Main Title Design	Mason Nicoll, Peter Pak, Giovana Pham and Cisco Torres	Won	
2022	NAACP Image Awards	Outstanding Drama Series	Godfather of Harlem	Nominated	
2022	NAACP Image Awards	Outstanding Actor in a Drama Series	Forest Whitaker	Nominated	
2022	NAACP Image Awards	Outstanding Supporting Actor in a Drama Series	Giancarlo Esposito	Nominated	
2022	NAACP Image Awards	Outstanding Directing in a Drama Series	Carl Seaton (for "The Bonanno Split")	Nominated	
2024	Writers Guild of America Awards	Episodic Drama	Chris Brancato & Michael Panes (for "Our Black Shining Prince")	Nominated	

== Docuseries ==
A documentary series titled By Whatever Means Necessary: The Times of Godfather of Harlem premiered on November 8, 2020, and concluded on November 29, 2020. Directed by Keith McQuirter, the miniseries examines the history of Harlem during the 1960s as depicted during the first season of Godfather of Harlem. McQuirter won the 2021 NAACP Image Award for Outstanding Directing in a Documentary (Television or Motion Picture) for his work on the series.
