= David Kundtz =

American self-help author

- Education: Georgetown University; St. Mary's Seminary; Graduate Theological Union (S.Th.D.)
- Occupations: Self-help author; psychotherapist
- Known for: Stopping (1998)
- Website: davidkundtz.com

David Kundtz is an American self-help author, and former Catholic priest and psychotherapist based in Kensington, California and Vancouver, British Columbia. He has written books on stillness, mindfulness, and emotional well-being. He is best known for his 1998 book Stopping: How to Be Still When You Have to Keep Going, which proposes "doing nothing intentionally" as an antidote to modern busyness.

== Early life and education ==
Kundtz grew up in Chagrin Falls, Ohio. He attended Georgetown University, then St. Mary's Seminary in Baltimore, Maryland, where he completed his seminary studies. He earned a doctorate in pastoral psychology (S.Th.D.) from the Graduate Theological Union in Berkeley, California.

== Early career ==
Kundtz was ordained to the Catholic priesthood in 1963 and served for 19 years, with postings in Idaho and Cali, Colombia. After leaving the priesthood, he went through an unplanned period of inactivity that he later credited as the origin of his thinking about busyness and stillness. He then worked as a counselor and psychotherapist in Berkeley, California.

== Writing ==
Kundtz wrote about stress and modern life, appearing in such publications as Redbook and the Wall Street Journal.

His first book, Stopping: How to Be Still When You Have to Keep Going, was published by Conari Press in 1998 with a foreword by Richard Carlson. The book proposes a practice of deliberate pauses he calls "stillpoints," "stopovers," and "grinding halts," scaled to the length of rest required. Booklist described it as "a good, commonsense adviser on a pervasive problem". It was published in seven languages, (Note: It was published in its original English, as well as Chinese, German, Korean, Japanese, Portuguese, and Spanish.) and, in 2021, Mango Publishing reissued the book as The Art of Stopping.

His other books include Nothing's Wrong: A Man's Guide to Managing His Feelings (2004), noted by Library Journal for public library collections and as a resource for counselors working with men; and Ministry Among God's Queer Folk: LGBTQ Pastoral Care (2007), co-authored with Bernard Schlager, which the Rainbow Round Table of the American Library Association recommended for seminary and theological school library collections, and the Journal of Lutheran Ethics reviewed it for readers new to LGBTQ pastoral care.

=== Books ===
- Stopping: How to Be Still When You Have to Keep Going (foreword by Richard Carlson, Conari Press, 1998) ISBN 978-1-57324-109-0
- Everyday Serenity: Meditations for People Who Do Too Much (foreword by Steven Harrison, Conari Press, 1999) ISBN 978-1-57324-162-5
- Quiet Mind: One-Minute Mindfulness (Conari Press, 2003) ISBN 978-1-68481-079-6
- Nothing's Wrong: A Man's Guide to Managing His Feelings (Conari Press, 2004) ISBN 978-1-57324-915-7
- Moments in Between: The Art of the Quiet Mind (Conari Press, 2006) ISBN 978-1-57324-276-9
- Ministry Among God's Queer Folk: LGBTQ Pastoral Care (with Bernard Schlager; Pilgrim Press, 2007) ISBN 978-0-8298-1706-5
- Awakened Mind: One-Minute Wake Up Calls (Conari Press, 2009) ISBN 978-1-57324-360-5
- Coming To: A Biomythography (Mill City Press, 2013) ISBN 978-1-935204-87-9
- Being Present: A Book of Daily Reflections (Conari Press, 2015) ISBN 978-1-57324-644-6

== Personal life ==
Kundtz has described himself as queer.
