= Flirting with Forty =

2008 film

- Promotional poster
- Based on: Flirting with Forty by Jane Porter
- Screenplay by: Julia Dahl
- Directed by: Mikael Salomon
- Starring: Heather Locklear; Robert Buckley; Vanessa Williams; Cameron Bancroft; Sam Duke; Anne Hawthorne; Chelah Horsdal; Stefanie von Pfetten
- Composer: Jeff Beal
- Country of origin: United States
- Original language: English

Production
- Producer: Lynn Raynor
- Cinematography: Jon Joffin
- Editor: Scott Vickrey
- Running time: 87 minutes
- Production companies: Peace Out Productions; Von Zerneck-Sertner Films; Nomadic Pictures; Sony Pictures Television

Original release
- Network: Lifetime
- Release: December 6, 2008

Flirting with Forty is a 2008 American romantic comedy-drama television film directed by Mikael Salomon from a screenplay by Julia Dahl, based on the novel with the same name by Jane Porter. Starring Heather Locklear and Robert Buckley, the film premiered on Lifetime on December 6, 2008.

The film focuses on Jackie (Locklear), a divorced mother who travels to Hawaii for her 40th birthday and meets a young surf instructor named Kyle (Buckley). The two flirt, Kyle teaches Jackie how to surf, and a relationship soon develops between the two.

== Plot ==
Jackie Laurens is almost 40 years old, recently divorced, and the mother of two children (Will and Jessica). While her children stay with her ex, Jackie takes a solo vacation to Hawaii, where she meets 27-year-old surf instructor Kyle Hamilton. After a one-night stand, Jackie becomes increasingly infatuated with her much younger lover and travels to see him whenever she can. However, her friends disapprove of her new relationship, and Jackie eventually has to return home when Jessica has an accident. However, the two lovers are eventually reunited.

== Cast ==
- Heather Locklear as Jackie Laurens
- Robert Buckley as Kyle Hamilton, Jackie's new Hawaiian boyfriend
- Vanessa Williams as Kristine, Jackie's best friend
- Cameron Bancroft as Daniel Laurens, Jackie's former husband
- Sam Duke as Will Laurens, Jackie and Daniel's son
- Jamie Bloch as Jessica Laurens, Jackie and Daniel's daughter
- Christy Greene as Melinda, Daniel's girlfriend
- Anne Hawthorne as Clare, Jackie's client
- Chelah Horsdal as Annie, Jackie's friend
- Stefanie von Pfetten as Nicole, Jackie's friend
- Ted Whittall as Dr. Sonnet
- James Bright as Tommy
- Thomas Meharey as Andrew

== Production ==
In February 2008, Lifetime announced via press release that Heather Locklear had been tapped to lead the upcoming film Flirting with Forty.

Flirting with Forty was filmed in Alberta and Hawaii. Honolulu Film Office commissioner Walea Constantinau credited the film with attracting tourists to the Royal Hawaiian Hotel. In an interview with PIX 11, Robert Buckley discussed becoming acquainted with Heather Locklear while filming intimate scenes and learning to get comfortable with taking off his shirt for the role.

== Release and reception ==
Lifetime claimed in a press release that the film attracted four million viewers during its December 6, 2008 television premiere.

Brian Lowry, in a review for Variety, compared the film to How Stella Got Her Groove Back and noted that, while unoriginal, the film sufficed as a "low-calorie snack" for romance fans. He also credited Vanessa Williams with delivering the film's best line. Neil Genzlinger, writing for The New York Times, gently mocked the film's dialogue and the superficially "holiday-themed" nature of the film, as well as the likelihood of experiencing such a romance in real life, but praised Heather Locklear's "age-defying" appearance and Robert Buckley's performance.

For her performance as Kristine, Vanessa Williams was nominated at the 40th NAACP Image Awards for Outstanding Actress in a Television Movie or Mini-Series. The award was won that year by Phylicia Rashad for her role in A Raisin in the Sun.
