= Heather Locklear =

American actress (born 1961)

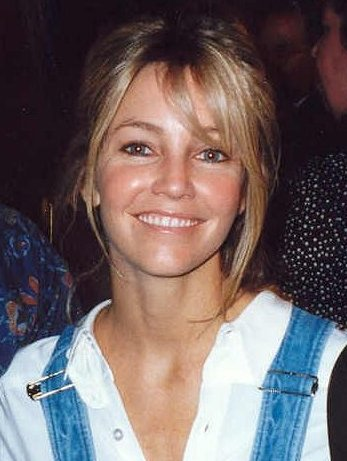
- Locklear in 1993
- Born: Heather Deen Locklear; September 25, 1961 (age 65); Los Angeles, California, U.S.
- Occupation: Actress
- Years active: 1980–present
- Known for: Dynasty; T. J. Hooker; Melrose Place; Spin City
- Spouses: Tommy Lee (m. 1986; div. 1993); Richie Sambora (m. 1994; div. 2007)
- Partner: Lorenzo Lamas (2026–present)
- Children: 1

Heather Deen Locklear (born September 25, 1961) is an American actress known for her role as Amanda Woodward on Melrose Place (1993–1999), for which she received four consecutive Golden Globe nominations for Best Actress – Television Series Drama. She is also known for her role as Sammy Jo Carrington on Dynasty from 1981 to 1989, her first major television role, which began a longtime collaboration with producer Aaron Spelling.

Other notable television roles include Officer Stacy Sheridan on T. J. Hooker (1982–1986) and Caitlin Moore on Spin City (1999–2002), for which she earned two more Golden Globe nominations, this time for Best Actress – Television Series Musical or Comedy. She had a recurring role on the TV Land sitcom Hot in Cleveland and a main role on the TNT drama-comedy television series Franklin & Bash in 2013. Her film roles include the science-fiction thriller Firestarter (1984), the action comedy Money Talks (1997), the live-action/animated comedy Looney Tunes: Back in Action (2003) and the romantic comedy The Perfect Man (2005).

== Early life ==
Heather Deen Locklear was born on September 25, 1961, in Los Angeles, California, the daughter of Diane née Tinsley (b. 1933), a production executive, and William "Bill" Robert Locklear (1929–2024), an administrator at the University of California, Los Angeles (UCLA) and former colonel in the United States Marine Corps. She has Lumbee ancestry. She has three older siblings: Laurie, Mark and Colleen.

== Career ==
=== 1980–1982: Beginnings ===
While at UCLA, she began modeling and working in commercials for the school store. She made her earliest screen appearances in the early 1980s with small roles in episodes of CHiPs, 240-Robert and Eight Is Enough. Locklear auditioned for Three's Company in 1980—producers were looking for someone to replace Suzanne Somers—but she did not get the role. Later, she was screen tested with then-unknown Tom Cruise for the lead roles on The Powers of Matthew Star, a 1982 NBC short-lived TV series.

=== 1982–1992: Breakthrough with Dynasty and T.J. Hooker ===
In 1982, Locklear began a long term association with television producer Aaron Spelling. First, she was cast in a recurring role as Sammy Jo Dean on Spelling's Dynasty. The following year, while still appearing on Dynasty, Locklear took on a starring role as Officer Stacy Sheridan on the police drama T.J. Hooker. She would shuffle between both series until 1986, when T.J. Hooker was cancelled; after that, Locklear became a full-time member of the cast of Dynasty and would stay with the series until its conclusion in 1989.

At a fan convention in Florida in 2024, Locklear described how the process of moving her from series to series worked: "I'd be in my police uniform, padded bra, all that s***, and then I'd have to be all glammed up, and they’d drive me to the Dynasty set, and so it kind of went back and forth...I just had two jobs!"

Following Dynasty's success, Locklear appeared in her first starring film as Drew Barrymore's mother in Firestarter (1984).

Locklear had a leading role in the 1989 film The Return of Swamp Thing, for which she won the satirical Razzie Award for Worst Actress. She also starred in the short-lived sitcom Going Places created for the TGIF block. It was her "first time filming in front of a live audience", she said in an interview with Barry Roskin Blake on Inside Entertainment in 1990.

=== 1993–1999: Melrose Place (1992) and worldwide recognition ===
In 1993, Heather Locklear began playing another of her best-known roles, Amanda Woodward, on Aaron Spelling's drama series Melrose Place created by Darren Star. Spelling originally signed Locklear for a limited four-episode run to boost interest, the first of which aired on January 27, 1993. Locklear is credited to boost ratings at the end of the first season and became a full-time cast member, though she continued to be billed as Special Guest Star in the opening credits from season two until its cancellation in 1999.

"It wasn't until Heather Locklear came on that she unlocked something, maybe because she brought this Dynasty cred. She literally could not say “hello” without an agenda", said Darren Star to Vulture. Years earlier, he talked to The Hollywood Reporter: "[I] meet with Heather and at the time, Amanda was a fairly innocuous part with a four-episode arc. Once we started writing for her and saw how she was able to take an innocuous line and give it devious subtext, that inspired so much in terms of where the show could go". Locklear remembered: "I just said, 'I wanna be a businesswoman. I don't wanna be Sammy Jo from Dynasty. I don't wanna, like, be a quirky girl".

According to The New York Times, "playing Amanda, Ms. Locklear has also taken a career that was sliding dangerously toward movies-of-the-week and given it new momentum". Locklear earned four Golden Globe Awards nominations for Best Actress in a Television Series – Drama from 1994 to 1997.

Locklear was the guest host on Saturday Night Live on May 14, 1994. Two of her best-known skits included her as an elderly Jewish woman on Coffee Talk with Mike Myers and her acting as Amanda Woodward in a Wayne's World skit with Myers, Chris Farley, Adam Sandler, Rob Schneider and Phil Hartman, wherein Wayne has a dream that he is a character on Melrose Place.

Locklear also made a cameo in Wayne's World 2 in 1993. In 1996, she appeared as the main guest on Muppets Tonight, performing in a spoof of Melrose Place titled "Muppet Heights". She was also the subject of a Lifetime Intimate Portrait special in 1997, and of an E! True Hollywood Story special in 2004.

Locklear was featured on the cover of Rolling Stone magazine on May 19, 1994, as Melrose Place reached the height of its popularity. She was named one of People Magazine's 50 Most Beautiful People twice, first in 1994, and again in 2001.

In 1996, Locklear starred in NBC movie Shattered Mind directed by Stephen Gyllenhaal in which she plays a woman with multiple personalities. The actress receive compliments from critics but no praise. According to Variety, "Locklear interps the roles with vigor and theatrical flair, if not plausibility" but "doesn't make the character convincing". Entertainment Weekly added: "Locklear is, if at times uneven, always admirable". At the time, Locklear said her work in this made-for-television film was important in her career: "I don't think I thought of myself as an actress probably until I've just done this movie. But I did know there was a lot more I could do, given the opportunity... With this last movie, I think I can say I'm an actress."

The following year, she appeared in the action-comedy Money Talks with her future Spin City co-star Charlie Sheen. It was her first major supporting role in a movie after cameos in Wayne's World 2 and The First Wives Club but it was "insipid", according to The New York Times.

The cancellation of Melrose Place in 1999 marks the end of Locklear and Aaron Spelling prolific collaboration. Throughout her career, the actress has appeared in eight television productions made by the TV titan: Dynasty, T. J. Hooker, Matt Houston, Fantasy Island, The Love Boat, Hotel, Melrose Place, and the television film Rich Men, Single Women. Spelling "called her his lucky penny", Melrose Place producer Chip Hayes said. In 2016, Heather Locklear paid tribute to Spelling during the 58th Annual Primetime Emmy Awards in Los Angeles.

=== 1999–2005: From drama to comedy ===
After Melrose Place ended in 1999, Locklear was cast in the fourth season of ABC sitcom Spin City, initially opposite Michael J. Fox and later Charlie Sheen. Fox and show staff approached her to play a woman who would manage the mayor's (Barry Bostwick) senatorial campaign. Locklear moved to New York for filming and Spin City rated top in its new time slot among 18-to-49-year-olds. DreamWorks boss Jeffrey Katzenberg credits "Sheen's instant chemistry with costar Heather Locklear for keeping the series spinning forward." The year after Sheen joined the show, production was relocated to Los Angeles where it remained until the end of the show. Locklear earned two Golden Globe Awards nominations for Best Actress in a Television Series – Comedy before the series ended in 2002.

Spin City marked a new beginning in Locklear's career with several comedies for television and theatrical movies. In 2002, Locklear had a brief recurring role in the sitcom Scrubs, another hit show created by Bill Lawrence years after Spin City. She also had a guest spot in the last season of David E. Kelley's legal comedy drama Ally McBeal. She played the love-interest of John C. McGinley and Peter MacNicol, respectively.

In 2003, she starred in a pilot for her own comedy series, Once Around the Park, but this was unsuccessful. The same year, Locklear appeared in the film Uptown Girls, a romantic comedy starring Brittany Murphy. In 2004, Locklear made a guest appearance on the sitcom Two and a Half Men, which starred her former Spin City co-star Charlie Sheen. In 2005, Locklear appeared in the film The Perfect Man with Hilary Duff. The same year, she had a brief recurring role on the drama series Boston Legal, which starred her former T. J. Hooker co-star William Shatner. Locklear reunited with executive producer David E. Kelley who cast her in a 2002 episode of Ally McBeal. "Her humor, sex appeal and mischief make her perfectly suited for Boston Legal", said the creator of the show in a press release. Locklear was also featured in a Biography Channel special.

In 2004, Locklear returned to drama in primetime opposite Blair Underwood and starred in the short-lived television drama series LAX set in the airport of the same name. She portrayed an ambitious airport executive overseeing the Los Angeles hub. She was also executive producer on the series, but it was cancelled after 10 aired episodes. "LAX debuted to an audience of 13 million. But then things went south — quickly: The series lost 5 million viewers in its second week and went into a free fall until November, when NBC axed the drama from its schedule", according to Entertainment Weekly.

=== Since 2006: Lifetime movies and guest roles ===
In 2006, Locklear starred in another television pilot, Women of a Certain Age, but this was unsuccessful.

In 2007, Locklear made another pilot for ABC, See Jayne Run, about a business woman who juggles a career with single motherhood, but this was also unsuccessful. She guest-starred on the series Hannah Montana and in the sitcom Rules of Engagement, and was placed 25th on TV Guide and Entertainment Weekly's "100 Greatest TV Icons" list.

Also in 2007, Locklear starred in her first Lifetime movie, Angels Fall, about a beautiful chef who moves to a small town in Wyoming after her Boston restaurant is shut down because of a fatal shooting. At the time, it was one of the top-ten most-watched telecasts in the history of the network. Then, in 2008, Locklear played in the romantic comedy-drama television film for Lifetime Flirting with Forty. It was the fourth most-watched original movie on basic cable that year with 4 million viewers.

In 2009, Locklear joined the cast of The CW's updated version of Melrose Place. Beginning on November 17, 2009, she reprised her role as Amanda Woodward and appeared in eight episodes. Ten years after the end of the original Melrose Place, Amanda Woodward is now a partner in a public relations firm, and is both mentor and tormentor to a young underling, Ella, played by Katie Cassidy. Despite Locklear's appearances (along with various other original series regulars), the new show was not a ratings success and was cancelled after one season. In 2011, Locklear starred in the television movie He Loves Me on the Lifetime Channel.

In 2012, Locklear began appearing in a recurring role on the TV Land comedy series Hot in Cleveland. In 2013, she became a regular on the comedy-drama Franklin & Bash. In 2014, Locklear featured in a public service announcement titled "We Are, Sarah Jones", in memory of camera assistant Sarah Jones who was killed in an accident on the set of Midnight Rider on February 20, 2014.

In 2016, Locklear appeared in the television movie The Game of Love, which aired on UP on May 15, 2016. Later in 2016, it was revealed that Locklear would be guest-starring in a recurring role in Tyler Perry's drama Too Close to Home on TLC.

In 2021, Locklear portrayed Kristine Carlson in the Lifetime television film Don't Sweat the Small Stuff: The Kristine Carlson Story, which follows the changes in Carlson's life after her husband Dr. Richard Carlson suddenly died in 2006.

In 2024, Locklear starred in the Lifetime film Mormon Mom Gone Wrong: The Ruby Franke Story as part of its "Ripped from the Headlines" feature films where she portrayed Jodi Hildebrandt.

== Other ventures ==
=== Business and endorsements ===
From 1997 to the middle of the 2000s, Locklear appeared in commercials for L'Oréal hair and cosmetic products. In 1999, she was one of the ambassadresses of the group at The Cannes International Film Festival in France.

In 2006, Heather Locklear appeared in the music video for country singer Toby Keith's single "Crash Here Tonight" that same year. When Keith died in 2024, she posts on Instagram: "Love and Respect. I got the wonderful gift of working on Crash Here Tonight video".

In 2020, Locklear joined Scrubs actors Zach Braff and Donald Faison in their podcast "Fake Doctors, Real Friends with Zach and Donald" (she had a two-episodes guest spot in their sitcom). On the pod, Locklear told of a "gross" moment filming The First Wives Club. She recalled her costar James Naughton touching her breast for a scene. Naughton's rep said the moment was written in the script. Later, Locklear clarified: "To be clear, I was never upset with James, just surprised".

In September 2024, Locklear made her first public appearance in nearly three years at 90s Con held in Daytona Beach, Florida.

In 2025, Locklear appeared with her former costars Daphne Zuniga, Laura Leighton, and Courtney Thorne-Smith on an episode of their Still the Place podcast. Earlier, she joined TV personality and personal friend Jillian Barberie as a guest on Armie Hammer’s podcast, The Armie HammerTime Podcast. Later, Locklear featured in Mike Cormier's podcast Mike Cormier on Air alongside author and close friend Kristine Carlson.

== Personal life ==
=== Relationships ===
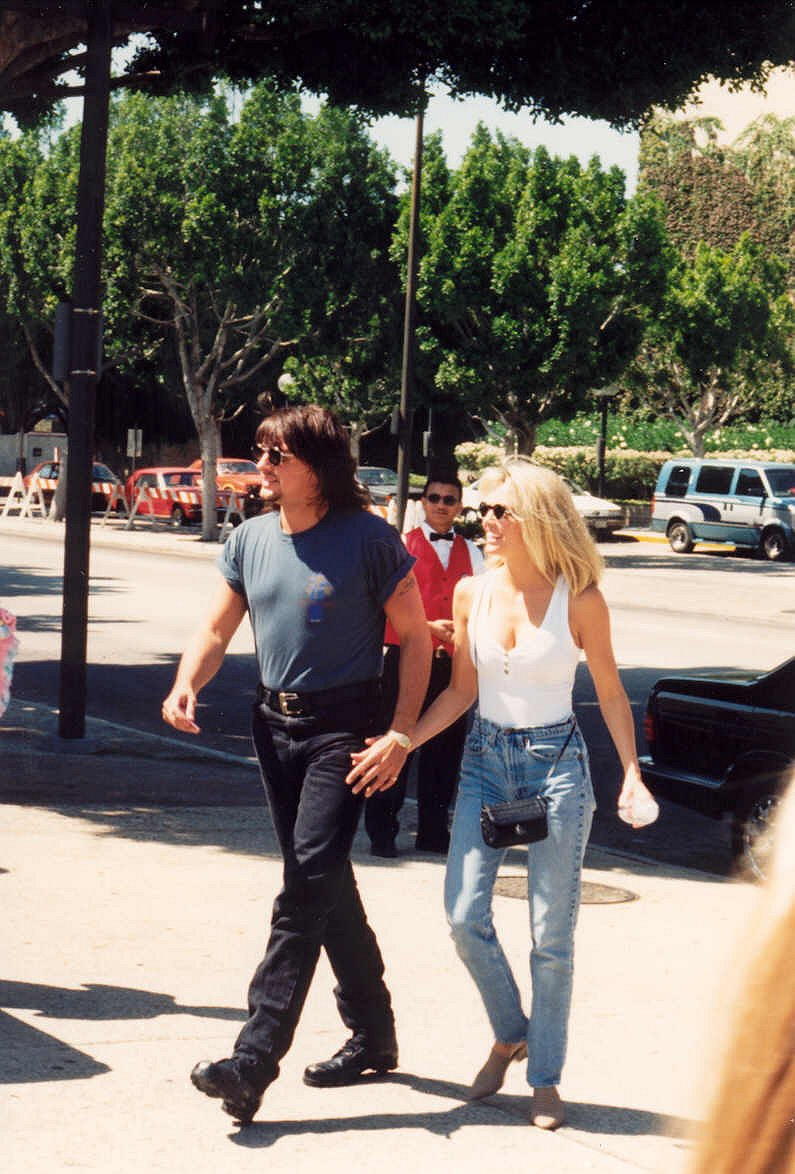
Locklear with Richie Sambora in 1994

Locklear was married to Mötley Crüe drummer Tommy Lee from May 10, 1986, to 1993. Locklear filed for divorce due to Lee's infidelity. After their divorce, she married Bon Jovi guitarist Richie Sambora, on December 17, 1994, in Paris. Their daughter Ava Elizabeth, was born on October 4, 1997. Locklear filed for divorce from Sambora in February 2006. The following month Sambora filed for joint custody of their daughter and enforcement of a prenuptial agreement. Their divorce was finalized in April 2007. In the same month, Locklear began a relationship with fellow Melrose Place alumnus Jack Wagner. In August 2011, Locklear and Wagner announced they were engaged. The couple had called off their engagement by that November.

In April 2020, Locklear became engaged to former motocross racer Chris Heisser, whom she first dated in high school. In May 2025, it was reported that the two had separated.

In April 2026, it was confirmed by a friend that Locklear was dating Lorenzo Lamas.

== Health and legal troubles ==
In March 2008, a 911 call was made by someone who claimed to be Locklear's doctor, who said that Locklear was trying to kill herself. Emergency responders were dispatched to Locklear's home. Her publicist later said that Locklear had never requested any medical assistance, and the Ventura County Sheriff's Department later stated that no further action was taken once they arrived at Locklear's Westlake Village home, as she appeared to be fine. They did, however, state that they believed the call was genuine.

On June 24, 2008, Locklear checked into a medical facility in Arizona for psychological ailments including anxiety and depression, and requested an in-depth evaluation of her medication to receive proper diagnosis and treatment. Her agent confirmed Locklear was suffering from anxiety and depression. On July 23, 2008, Locklear returned home after four weeks of treatment at the facility.

In September 2008, Locklear was pulled over by a California Highway Patrol officer and arrested on suspicion of driving under the influence, just outside Santa Barbara after she was seen driving erratically. Police had been tipped off about Locklear's driving by Jill Ishkanian, a former reporter and editor at Us Weekly magazine, who saw Locklear outside a market in Montecito, California. Ishkanian photographed the incident and then sold the photos to the celebrity-news website TMZ.com for $27,500 (equivalent to $41,122 in 2025), although she claims it was a chance meeting and denies having followed or set up Locklear to obtain photographs. Locklear was formally charged on November 17, 2008, with one misdemeanor count of driving under the influence. A blood test detected no alcohol nor illegal narcotics, but Santa Barbara County Deputy District Attorney Lee Carter stated authorities believe the prescription medications Locklear consumed for her anxiety and depression "could have impaired her ability to safely drive a motor vehicle." On January 2, 2009, Locklear pleaded no contest to reckless driving, and in return the district attorney dismissed the DUI charges. Locklear was sentenced to three years of informal probation, a DMV driver safety class and a $700 fine.

On January 12, 2012, Locklear's sister called 911 when she believed Locklear was in danger after reportedly taking prescription drugs and alcohol. Emergency personnel responded, and Locklear was taken to Los Robles Hospital in Thousand Oaks, California, but was reported to be out of danger the following day.

In February 2018, Locklear was arrested for domestic violence and battery against a police officer. She was charged with one felony count of domestic violence and three misdemeanor counts of battery on a police officer. As deputies arrived at her Thousand Oaks home, she allegedly kicked three of the arresting deputy sheriffs and told them she would shoot at them if they ever came into her home again. According to audio of the 911 call, Locklear's brother called the police after coming to her home, where he found Locklear and her boyfriend arguing. Locklear was released on a $20,000 bond just before 6 a.m. the next day. Locklear's boyfriend, former American Motorcycle Association motocross racer Chris Heisser, was arrested on a driving under the influence charge in Thousand Oaks, hours after Locklear had been taken into custody. After obtaining a warrant, police searched her home for a weapon on March 12 but found none.

On June 24, 2018, Locklear was arrested again, this time for two misdemeanor counts of battery. On June 25, 2018, after being released on bail for charges of battery, Locklear was hospitalized in a suspected case of overdose. In August 2019, she pleaded no contest to charges stemming from that arrest and was sentenced to 30 days in a residential mental health facility.

In April 2020, Locklear wrote on Instagram that she had been sober for one year. She has received treatment for addiction 20 times.

== Awards and nominations ==
Year	Association	Category	Nominated work	Result
1983	Bravo Otto Awards	Best Female TV Star	Dynasty	Won
1984	Bravo Otto Awards	Best Female TV Star	Dynasty	Nominated
1986	Soap Opera Digest Awards	Outstanding Actress/Actor in a Comic Relief Role on a Prime Time Serial	Dynasty	Nominated
1989	Bravo Otto Awards	Best Female TV Star	Dynasty	Won
1989	Golden Raspberry Awards	Worst Actress	The Return of Swamp Thing	Won
1990	Bravo Otto Awards	Best Female TV Star	Dynasty	Nominated
1990	Soap Opera Digest Awards	Outstanding Supporting Actress: Prime Time	Dynasty	Nominated
1991	Bravo Otto Awards	Best Female TV Star	Dynasty	Nominated
1994	Golden Globe Awards	Best Performance by an Actress in a Television Series - Drama	Melrose Place	Nominated
1994	First Americans in the Arts	Best Actress in a Television Series	Melrose Place	Won
1995	Golden Globe Awards	Best Performance by an Actress in a Television Series - Drama	Melrose Place	Nominated
1996	Golden Globe Awards	Best Performance by an Actress in a Television Series - Drama	Melrose Place	Nominated
1997	Golden Globe Awards	Best Performance by an Actress in a Television Series - Drama	Melrose Place	Nominated
2000	Golden Globe Awards	Best Performance by an Actress in a Television Series – Musical or Comedy	Spin City	Nominated
2002	Golden Globe Awards	Best Performance by an Actress in a Television Series – Musical or Comedy	Spin City	Nominated
2004	TV Land Awards	Favorite Teen Dream – Female	Melrose Place	Won (5th place)

== Filmography ==
=== Television ===
Year	Title	Role	Notes
1980	CHiPs	Teenager	Episode: "Satan's Angels"
1981	240-Robert	Jean	Episode: "Hostages"
1981	Eight is Enough	Ingrid	Episode: "Yet Another Seven Days in February"
1981	Twirl	Cherie Sanders	Television film
1981–1989	Dynasty	Sammy Jo Carrington	127 episodes (recurring S2–5; main S6–9)
1982	The Fall Guy	June Edwards	Episode: "Scavenger Hunt"
1982	Fantasy Island	Lorraine Wentworth	Episode: "Thank God, I'm a Country Girl"
1982	Matt Houston	Cindy McNichol	Episode: "Stop the Presses"
1982–1986	T. J. Hooker	Officer Stacy Sheridan	84 episodes (main S2–5)
1983	Tales of the Unexpected	Pat Ward	Episode: "Youth from Vienna"
1983	Hotel	Miranda Harding	Episode: "Choices"
1983	The Love Boat	Patti Samuels	Episode: "Youth Takes a Holiday/Don't Leave Home Without It/Prisoner of Love"
1983	The Fall Guy	Paige Connally	Episode: "Just a Small Circle of Friends"
1984	City Killer	Andrea McKnight	Television film
1988	Rock 'n' Roll Mom	Darcy X	Television film
1990	Jury Duty: The Comedy	Rita Burwald	Television film
1990	Rich Men, Single Women	Tori	Television film
1990–1991	Going Places	Alexandra "Alex" Burton	19 episodes (main)
1991	Dynasty: The Reunion	Sammy Jo Carrington	Miniseries
1991	Her Wicked Ways	Melody Shepherd	Television film
1992	Batman: The Animated Series	Lisa Clark (voice)	Episode: "Prophecy of Doom"
1992	Body Language	Betsy	Television film
1992	Highway Heartbreaker	Alex	Television film
1992	Illusions	Jan Sanderson	Television film
1993–1999	Melrose Place	Amanda Woodward	199 episodes (recurring S1; main S2–7)
1993	Fade to Black	Victoria	Television film
1995	Texas Justice	Priscilla Davis	Miniseries
1996	Shattered Mind	Suzy / Bonnie / Ginger / Victoria / D.J.	Television film
1997	Muppets Tonight	Herself	Guest star
1999	VH1 Vogue Fashion Awards	Herself / Hostess	TV special
1999–2002	Spin City	Caitlin Moore	71 episodes (main S4–6)
2000	King of the Hill	Peggy Donovan (voice)	Episode: "Old Glory"
2002	Ally McBeal	Nicole Naples	"Tom Dooley"
2002	Scrubs	Julie Keaton	Episode: "My First Step"; "My Fruit Cups"
2003	Once Around the Park	Alex Wingfield	Pilot
2004	Two and a Half Men	Laura Lang	Episode: "No Sniffing, No Wowing"
2004–2005	LAX	Harley Random	13 episodes (main)
2005	Boston Legal	Kelly Nolan	Episodes: "The Black Widow"; "Schadenfreude"
2006	Women of a Certain Age	Barb	Pilot
2007	Angels Fall	Reese Gilmore	Television film
2007	Hannah Montana	Heather Truscott	Episode: "Lilly's Mom Has Got It Goin' On"
2007	Rules of Engagement	Barbara	Episodes: "Audrey's Sister"; "Engagement Party"
2007	See Jayne Run	Jayne Doherty	Pilot
2008	Flirting with Forty	Jackie Laurens	Television film
2009–2010	Melrose Place	Amanda Woodward	8 episodes
2011	He Loves Me	Laura	Television film
2012–2013	Hot in Cleveland	Chloe	3 episodes
2013	Franklin & Bash	Rachel King	10 episodes (main S3)
2016	The Game of Love	Frankie	Television film
2016–2017	Too Close to Home	The First Lady	8 episodes (recurring S1-2)
2017	Fresh Off the Boat	Sarah	Episode: "The Gloves Are Off"
2021	Don't Sweat The Small Stuff: The Kristine Carlson Story	Kristine Carlson	Television film
2024	Mormon Mom Gone Wrong: The Ruby Franke Story	Jodi Hildebrandt	Television film

=== Film ===
Year	Title	Role
1984	Firestarter	Victoria 'Vicky' Tomlinson McGee
1989	The Return of Swamp Thing	Abigail "Abby" Arcane
1991	The Big Slice	Rita
1993	Wayne's World 2	Herself (cameo)
1996	The First Wives Club	Sharon Griffin (cameo)
1997	Double Tap	Agent Katherine Hanson
1997	Money Talks	Grace Cipriani
2003	Looney Tunes: Back in Action	Dusty Tails
2003	Uptown Girls	Roma Schleine
2005	The Perfect Man	Jean Hamilton
2006	Game of Life	Irene
2009	Flying By	Pamela
2013	Scary Movie 5	Barbara

=== Producer ===
Year	Title	Role	Notes
1998–1999	Melrose Place	Co–producer	28 episodes
2004–05	LAX	Producer	12 episodes

== See also ==
- List of notable Lumbee
