= Jane Porter =

Jane Porter may refer to:

- Jane Porter (English novelist) (1775 or 1776–1850), English historical novelist, dramatist, and literary figure
- Jane Porter (American novelist), American romance novelist
- Jane Porter (Tarzan), fictional character in Edgar Rice Burroughs's Tarzan novels and their adaptations
