= JLE =

JLE may refer to:

- Jewish Learning Exchange, a program run by Yeshiva Ohr Somayach, Jerusalem
- Journal of Lutheran Ethics, an online journal of Lutheran social theology
- Jubilee Line Extension, an extension to a line of the London Underground
- Justice League Elite, a DC Comics superhero team published 2004–2005
- Justice League Europe, a DC Comics superhero team published 1989–1994
