= High Incident =

- Genre: Police drama
- Starring: Matthew Beck; David Keith; Dylan Bruno; Matt Craven; Wendy Davis; Cole Hauser; Aunjanue Ellis; Blair Underwood; Lisa Vidal
- Theme music composer: Hans Zimmer
- Composers: Jeff Rona (season 1); John Powell; Christopher Tyng
- Country of origin: United States
- Original language: English
- No. of seasons: 2
- No. of episodes: 32

Production
- Executive producers: Eric Bogosian; Michael Pavone; Ann Donahue; Steven Spielberg; Dave Alan Johnson
- Producers: Jack Clements; W. K. Scott Meyer; Ralph Winter
- Running time: 44 minutes
- Production companies: Johnson/Pavone Productions (season 1); Nothing But Net, Inc. (season 1); Donwell Productions (season 2); DreamWorks Television

Original release
- Network: ABC
- Release: March 4, 1996 – May 8, 1997

High Incident is a police drama television series produced by DreamWorks Television for the ABC network. The show was created by Steven Spielberg, Michael Pavone, Eric Bogosian, and Dave Alan Johnson. It aired from March 4, 1996, to May 8, 1997, running a total of 32 episodes.

== Premise ==
The show focused on the everyday stories of a group of El Camino Police Department (ECPD) officers investigating and solving crimes.

== Cast ==
Main cast

- Matthew Beck as Officer Terry Hagar
- Dylan Bruno as Officer Andy Lightner (season 1)
- Matt Craven as Officer Lenny Gayer
- Wendy Davis as Lynette White
- Aunjanue Ellis as Officer Leslie Joyner
- Cole Hauser as Officer Randy Willitz
- David Keith as Senior Lead Officer Jim Marsh
- Catherine Kellner as Officer Gayle Van Camp (season 1)
- Julio Oscar Mechoso as Officer Richie Fernandez (season 1)
- Louis Mustillo as Officer Russell Topps
- Lindsay Frost as Sergeant Helen Sullivan (season 2)
- Blair Underwood as Senior Lead Officer Michael Rhoades (season 2)
- Lisa Vidal as Officer Jessica Helgado (season 2)

== Production ==
High Incident was filmed in the San Fernando Valley neighborhood of Chatsworth, Los Angeles, which doubles for the fictional El Camino. The executive producers of the series are Michael Pavone, Dave Alan Johnson, and Eric Bogosian, with Charles Haid as the co-executive producer-director. DreamWorks co-founder Steven Spielberg receives story credit, with Haid noting that "Steven Spielberg is on the set almost every day." High Incident was one of six shows predating the launch of DreamWorks' more successful film division DreamWorks Pictures, which started releasing movies in September 1997 with The Peacemaker. The theme for High Incident was composed by Hans Zimmer, who also did the background score for The Peacemaker.

The series was renewed for a second season, but was moved to the Thursday at 8:00 p.m. timeslot opposite Friends on NBC, with Blair Underwood, Lisa Vidal, and Lindsay Frost joining the cast. Although it received good reviews and fair ratings, it was canceled after the end of its second season in May 1997, due to its lower ratings against NBC's Friends and The Single Guy, and CBS's Diagnosis: Murder on Thursday evenings.

== Broadcasts and rights ==
Internationally, the show aired in Australia on both the free-to-air Nine Network and the pay channel Fox8, while in the United Kingdom it aired on pay channel Sky One. In February 2006, Viacom (now known as Paramount Skydance) purchased the rights to High Incident and all other television shows and live-action movies DreamWorks produced since their inception. The show has since been distributed by Paramount Television.

== Reception ==
Todd Everett of Variety describes some of the series' characters as being a "tired stereotype", but praises director/co-exec producer Charles Haid for getting "a lot out of his fine cast, and several of the action scenes show above-average energy."

== Episodes ==
=== Series overview ===
Season	Episodes	Originally aired (U.S. dates)	
Season	Episodes	First aired	Last aired
1	10	March 4, 1996	September 12, 1996
2	22	September 17, 1996	May 8, 1997

==== Broadcast history ====
- Mondays 9:00 p.m. (March 4, 1996 – April 15, 1996)
- Thursdays 8:00 p.m. (August 15, 1996 – May 8, 1997)
- Tuesday 10:00 p.m. (Special "preview" premiere time for second-season premiere on September 17, 1996)

=== Season 1 (1996) ===
No. overall	No. in season	Title	Directed by	Written by	Original release date
1	1	"Pilot"	Charles Haid	Story by : Steven Spielberg & Eric Bogosian & Michael Pavone & Dave Alan Johnson; Teleplay by : Eric Bogosian & Michael Pavone & Dave Alan Johnson	March 4, 1996
The pilot episode introduces the men and women of the (fictional) El Camino Police Department (ECPD). A traffic stop leads to tragedy; and a rookie cop Randy Willitz learns the ropes from a veteran. Also: patrol cars respond to a call about a bully terrorizing a condo complex.
2	2	"Till Death Do Us Part"	Charles Haid	Michael Pavone & Dave Alan Johnson	March 11, 1996
ECPD is called in when the bride's family is ready to kill the groom. Gayle's father Tony (R. Lee Ermey), a retired USMC Major, spends the day riding with Gayle and Richie. A man lands in hot water when his dog is hit by a car. Lenny is introduced to his new partner Officer Leslie Joyner.
3	3	"Coroner's Day Off"	Michael Watkins	William M. Finkelstein	March 18, 1996
Marsh, who's been slapped with a sexual-harassment charge by Bonner (Lucinda Jenney), recommends her for undercover-hooker detail; and Willitz spends an uneasy day corpse-sitting a suicide.
4	4	"Women and Children First"	Randall Zisk	Fred Ellis & Monte Williams	April 1, 1996
Officers Van Camp and Fernandez brave downed power lines to reach a father and son trapped in an overturned vehicle.
5	5	"Sometimes a Vague Notion"	Tony Bill	Tracey Stern	April 8, 1996
Terry believes that a missing boy (Jordan Blake Warkol) is trapped in a pipe at a construction site---and he'll move heaven and earth to prove he's right.
6	6	"Father Knows Best"	Charles Haid	Michael Pavone & Dave Alan Johnson	April 15, 1996
Marsh takes some drastic measures to ensure that his rebellious daughter (Mena Suvari) remains on the straight and narrow. Meanwhile, Van Camp finds herself on the business end of a stun gun. Guest star: Mena Suvari as Jill Marsh.
7	7	"Follow the Leader"	Dan Lerner	Fred Ellis & Monte Williams	August 15, 1996
Lenny is back on patrol. Willitz finds himself in a hostage-situation standoff with a man (Cotter Smith) who shot his wife.
8	8	"52-Car Pick Up"	Jake Paltrow	Tracey Stern	August 29, 1996
Officers Topps and Hagar find themselves in a multivehicle pileup on a fogbound freeway. Guest stars: Patrick Malone as Neal, Titus Welliver as Sergeant Crispo, Ricky Aiello as Al, Kelsey Berglund as Anna.
9	9	"Truth or Consequences"	Davis Guggenheim	William M. Finkelstein	September 5, 1996
Officers Van Camp and Fernandez respond to a call at a house where a father shot his son after mistaking him for a burglar.
10	10	"The Lady or the Tiger"	Charles Haid	Story by : Michael Pavone & Dave Alan Johnson; Teleplay by : Fred Ellis & Monte Williams	September 12, 1996
Andy and Russell are called to the West Valley Zoo where several animals have somehow escaped. The most troubling escapee is a 600 pound Bengal tiger. Gayle and Richie respond to a burglar alarm at a home, and find a suspicious man who claims he's taking care of the plants and swallowing something and arrests him. Later, they recover two diamond rings which have worked their way through his system.

=== Season 2 (1996–97) ===
No. overall	No. in season	Title	Directed by	Written by	Original release date
11	1	"Hello/Goodbye"	Charles Haid	Ann Donahue	September 17, 1996
When Officer Gayle Van Camp is badly wounded in the line of duty, the El Camino police force begins a desperate search for the perpetrator. New cast members are introduced including, Blair Underwood as Officer Mike Rhoades, Lisa Vidal as Officer Jessica Helgado, and Lindsay Frost as Sergeant Helen Sullivan. Beth (Lesley Boone) experiences a series of false labor pains causing her husband Terry to panic. When she is finally ready to deliver, Terry is not around and it is a nervous Russell who must take over. Gayle dies as Beth gives birth to a healthy 7 pound, 6 ounce baby boy. Note: Special "advance" Tuesday preview premiere.
12	2	"Nobody Walks in El Camino"	Charles Haid	Fred Ellis & Monte Williams	September 19, 1996
Jim Marsh finds his car has been vandalized by Julia's murderer, her husband, who insanely blames Jim for breaking up his marriage and forcing him to kill his wife. Terry has become a new father and must deal with Russell's paternal feelings as well as his own. Jessica and Mike feel their talents are being wasted when they are assigned to bus patrol. A nasty mob attacks the bus, changing their minds. Note: Aired in regular season 2 Thursday timeslot.
13	3	"Welcome to America"	Les Landau	Art Monterastelli	September 26, 1996
Jim Marsh and Randy Willitz pursue a truck full of illegal immigrants until it crashes. A bystander videotapes the incident, as Marsh uses force to contain and arrest the driver. The driver accuses Jim of using excessive force. A passenger of the truck later dies of wounds the driver inflicted on him. Mike and Jessica respond to a two-car collision. Mike is harassed by the gathering crowd for not protecting "his own," after he cites a black man for reckless driving. A member of the Algerian women's Olympic track team steals a diamond bracelet from a jewelry store because she wants to be put in jail in America so she won't have to return home where she fears persecution.
14	4	"Who'll Stop the Bombs?"	Tony Bill	Kevin Arkadie	October 3, 1996
A serial bomber is loose in El Camino, and in a brazen moves plants a bomb in the drinks machine inside the police station. Called to a possible explosion, Russell finds drugs hidden in a truckload of manure. When the bomber is identified, Marsh helps the man understand that while his wife has taken the children away, the kids still need a father.
15	5	"The Godfather"	Michael Katleman	Kim Newton	October 10, 1996
Mike Rhoades arrests a 15-year-old juvenile and takes him under his wing. Later the teen is beaten-up by his step-father. He finds his step-fathers gun and threatens to shoot the man. The kid is coaxed into dropping the gun by Rhodes and the abuser is arrested. When Len's son, Joel is missing, the El Camino police force come together for the search and Sue (Elizabeth Harmon-Haid) blames Len's affair with Lynette for their distraught son's disappearance. Len goes undercover and gets the convicted child molester who took his son, to lead him to where the attacker took him. Joel is scared but unharmed. Meanwhile, Russell is concerned about his baptism duties as the christening date for Terry's son approaches. Leslie finally tells her peers about her long lost daughter.
16	6	"Masquerade"	Ralph Winter	W.K. Scott Meyer	October 17, 1996
Halloween is a cop's nightmare. Halloween day begins with a station wagon crashing into a prison bus, allowing four convicts to escape. Halloween night is even more tense. Lenny Gayer is crushed when his wife decides that she doesn't want him to spend Halloween with her and the kids. Randy Willitz must face the fact that his father is an alcoholic after he's arrested for DUI. Leslie is torn between Trick-or-Treating with her daughter Anita, and being a good cop. Russell spends his day trying to scare Sergeant Sullivan.
17	7	"Shake, Rattle & Roll"	Dan Lerner	Tracey Stern	October 31, 1996
El Camino is shaken by a 6.2 earthquake. Officers Jessica Helgado and Mike Rhoades are called to a collapsed tunnel, where they attempt to save the life of a young woman in labor. The woman is trapped inside an ambulance and bleeding. Mike breaks one of the ambulances small windows, and Jessie squeezes through. The woman later bleeds to death, but Jessie must continue to deliver the baby. The boy baby is born healthy. Just when Terry and his family think they made it through the earthquake unharmed, they learn their home has been destroyed. Guest stars: Kelly Schmidt as unknown, Catherine Dent as unknown, Lesley Boone as Beth Hagar, Mena Suvari as Jill Marsh.
18	8	"Change Partners"	Charles Haid	Art Monterastelli	November 7, 1996
A gang pulls off well-planned armored-car robberies; and a hospital worker (Adam Scott) is caught stealing cadavers and selling them to a man (Terry Kiser) who supplies third-world medical schools.
19	9	"Bullet the Blue Sky"	D.J. Caruso	Kevin Arkadie & Kim Newton	November 21, 1996
A sniper is targeting ECPD officers, killing an officer from a neighbouring division. In this climate, everyday work becomes more difficult, and while the investigation does not deliver the sniper, it's not a complete loss. Guest stars: Hinton Battle as Brian, Bill Stevenson as Ted, Elise Neal as Arial, Tobin Bell as Birsic, Joel de la Fuente as Detective Aquino.
20	10	"Warrant Peace"	Tony Bill	Story by : Tracey Stern; Teleplay by : Fred Ellis & Monte Williams	December 5, 1996
With the sniper still on the loose, the mayor orders ECPD execute warrants on a long list of fine defaulters. Meanwhile, Rhoades is fighting to keep Derek's own gang from killing him.
21	11	"Christmas Blues"	Michael Katleman	Art Monterastelli & W.K. Scott Meyer	December 12, 1996
On Christmas Eve, Russell enlists the aid of his homeless brother (Robert David Hall) and his street pals to find a missing baby who was abandoned in a church by the distraught mother.
22	12	"My Brother's Keeper"	Charles Haid	Tracey Stern	January 9, 1997
Gayle Van Camp's killer (Michael Chieffo) escapes and returns to El Camino, where he kidnaps Willitz's brother to try to force a showdown with the cop.
23	13	"No Money Down"	D.J. Caruso	Ann Donahue & Art Monterastelli	January 16, 1997
Lenny becomes upset while visiting the home he previously shared with his wife and kids and learns that it was sold. Another two officers, Mike and Jessie, respond to a 911 call and find a man driving a truck into his own newly rebuilt home. The major storyline in this episode involves a bank-robbery. While attempting to stop the robbery, another officer named Terry is taken hostage, along with seven other people. The robbers are a married couple named Bobby (Morgan Stevens) and Rita Miller (Jo Anderson). They have a young son and the bank recently had repossessed their house because they missed mortgage payments. Terry and the police force outside of the building work to resolve the situation and prevent anyone from getting hurt. The El Camino Police force and the SWAT team work together to prevent anyone from getting hurt. Guest stars: Morgan Stevens as Bobby Miller, Jo Anderson as Rita Miller, Ken Jenkins as Burt, Xander Berkeley as SWAT Team Captain Hackworth, Michael Stoyanov as Chapman, Enrique Castillo as unknown, Kitty Swink as unknown, Stan Cahill as unknown, Mariangela Pino as unknown.
24	14	"Knock Knock"	Whitney Ransick	Story by : Fred Ellis & Monte Williams; Teleplay by : Kevin Arkadie	January 30, 1997
The ECPD acquires a police dog trained to carry a surveillance camera into dangerous territory. Soon after, El Camino is hit with a wave of home invasions. Guest stars: Thomas F. Duffy as Billy, George Gerdes as unknown, Laura Johnson as Daphne Grainger, Paul Kent as Steven Carlisle, Rob Stewart as Keeler, Todd Kimsey as Montford: Jennifer Rhodes as Gloria.
25	15	"Black & Blue"	D.J. Caruso	Ann Donahue & Kim Newton	February 6, 1997
Mike Rhoades is falsely arrested because he was black man driving a sportscar in a poor neighborhood. Later, Marsh, Rhoades, and several other El Camino police officers go to the same bad neighborhood to restore order. Marsh meets a large 40-year-old black woman. The deputy Sheriff is brought up on corruption charges. Guest stars: Esther Scott as Teresa, Bradley Whitford as Engler, Xander Skye as Marky, Dee Freeman as Danetta, Anthony Anderson as Sonny.
26	16	"Hot Wire"	Dan Lerner	Art Monterastelli & Tracey Stern	February 13, 1997
A ring of gun-toting car thieves specializing in luxury autos hits El Camino; and a paroled sex offender (David Packer) moves back into town. Guest stars: David Packer as unknown, Michael Fairman as unknown, Evelyn Iocolano as Cinnamon, Vanessa Marcil as Kerry Andrews.
27	17	"Excessive Force"	Jake Paltrow	Kevin Arkadie & W.K. Scott Meyer	February 27, 1997
A suspect who resisted arrest dies while en route to the booking, so Internal Affairs investigates Helgado for excessive force. Also, patrons of a gay bar are being victimized by local toughs. Guest stars: Michael McCraine as Tonya, Dan Bucatinsky as Bootz Brotman, Dana Gladstone as unknown, James Logan as Jet, Rob Stewart as Keeler, Gary Anthony Sturgis as unknown.
28	18	"Show Me the Money"	Whitney Ransick	Art Monterastelli & Tracey Stern	March 13, 1997
Officers are suspected of removing $50,000 from the property room; and agents put the moves on a high-school basketball star (Marcus Mitchell). Guest stars: Bronson Pinchot as Matt Shukat.
29	19	"Remote Control"	D.J. Caruso	Bonnie Mark	April 3, 1997
While checking on offenders who are being electronically monitored under house arrest, Rhoades is reunited with a former friend from his street-gang days. Meanwhile, Marsh gets too close to a witness (Vanessa Marcil) in protective custody. Guest stars: Vanessa Marcil as Kerry Andrews.
30	20	"Camino High"	Stephen Cragg	Wendy Battles & R.J. Berenstein	April 24, 1997
Rich, white high-school kids, friends of Marsh's daughter, are suspected of pushing heroin; and a local (Marc Grapey) thinks his neighbor (Melora Walters) is a witch and that she's cast a spell on him. Guest stars: Timothy Olyphant as Officer Brett Farraday. (Note: Olyphant appears in the final three episodes of the series; it appears that if High Incident had continued, Olyphant would have become a regular.)
31	21	"Starting Over"	Allen Coulter	Genia Shipman	May 1, 1997
On his first day on patrol, a rookie cop blows two opportunities to apprehend a serial rapist; and Gayer tries to help an ex-hooker (Michael McCraine) start over. Guest stars: Timothy Olyphant as Officer Brett Farraday.
32	22	"Shootout"	Art Monterastelli	Ann Donahue	May 8, 1997
A botched bank job turns deadly when civilians and outgunned ECPD officers are trapped in the line of fire by robbers armed with military-assault weapons. Officer Lenny Gayer is shot a mile from the scene by a stray bullet, causing paralysis from the waist down. Also: Officer Mike Rhoades is shot in the thigh and shoulder. He suffers head trauma when he falls to the ground. Guest stars: Derk Cheetwood as Officer Smith, Michael McCraine as Tanya, Timothy Olyphant as Officer Brett Farraday, Julie Inouye as Lisa, Jamie A. Keyser as Soccer Mom, Scott Lincoln as Zobek, Walter Addison as Mayor. Notes: The events of this episode are based North Hollywood bank robbery shootout on February 28, 1997.; A dedication preceding the closing credits marks this episode as a memorial to the more than 1,200 U.S. police officers killed in the line of duty in the preceding ten years.
