= Montrose Hagins =

American actress (1917–2012)

- Born: Annie Montrose Hagins; June 12, 1917; Charlotte, North Carolina, U.S.
- Died: October 24, 2012 (aged 95); Rancho Palos Verdes, California, U.S.
- Resting place: Green Hills Memorial Park
- Occupation(s): Television actress, educator
- Years active: 1986–2003

Montrose Hagins (June 12, 1917 – October 24, 2012) was an American television actress and former schoolteacher. Hagins either starred or had been a guest on many popular television shows such as: Seinfeld, Roc, 227, The Golden Girls, Sister, Sister, The Hughleys, The Jamie Foxx Show, What's Happening Now, The Sinbad Show, Touched by an Angel, and The Famous Jett Jackson. She also became the replacement for Rosetta LeNoire as Leola Henderson-Forbes in the final season on Amen. Her television credits also include more guest spots on shows such as: E/R, Hangin' with Mr. Cooper, Hunter, Malcolm & Eddie, and Moesha. She also had a recurring role in Homefront, a series set in post-World War II Ohio.

Hagins, who was one of five siblings, was the daughter of an Episcopal minister. Prior to becoming an actress, Hagins, who was a longtime friend of fellow veteran African-American character actresses Rosetta LeNoire (of ABC-TV's Family Matters) and Esther Rolle (better known to TV sitcom viewers as Florida Evans of CBS-TV's Good Times TV series fame), was a 4th grade teacher at Williams Elementary School and a member of St. Augustine's Episcopal Church in Gary, Indiana. She also was a board member for St. Jude's Children's Research Hospital. She also was a staunch liberal Democrat and African American Rights Activist.

She retired from acting in 2005, and then spending the last years of her life living in an antique farmhouse in Pennsylvania. Hagins reportedly owned four homes which consisted of a summer and fall house in Lancaster, Pennsylvania, as well as two homes in Rancho Palos Verdes, California and a home in her hometown of Charlotte, North Carolina. She is buried at Green Hills Memorial Park in Rancho Palos Verdes, California.

== Filmography ==
Year	Title	Role	Notes
1986	Critters	Organist	
1988	Critters 2: The Main Course	Farm Woman	
1988	Coming to America	Grandma Jenks	
1989	Say Anything...	Bess	
1992	Ruby Cairo	Fergus Groupie	
1995	Return to Two Moon Junction	Ruth	
1996	Shiloh	Mrs. McCallister	
1997	The Relic	Chanting Woman	
2003	Bringing Down the House	Charlene's Neighbor	(final film role)
