= Vanessa Estelle Williams =

American actress (born 1963)

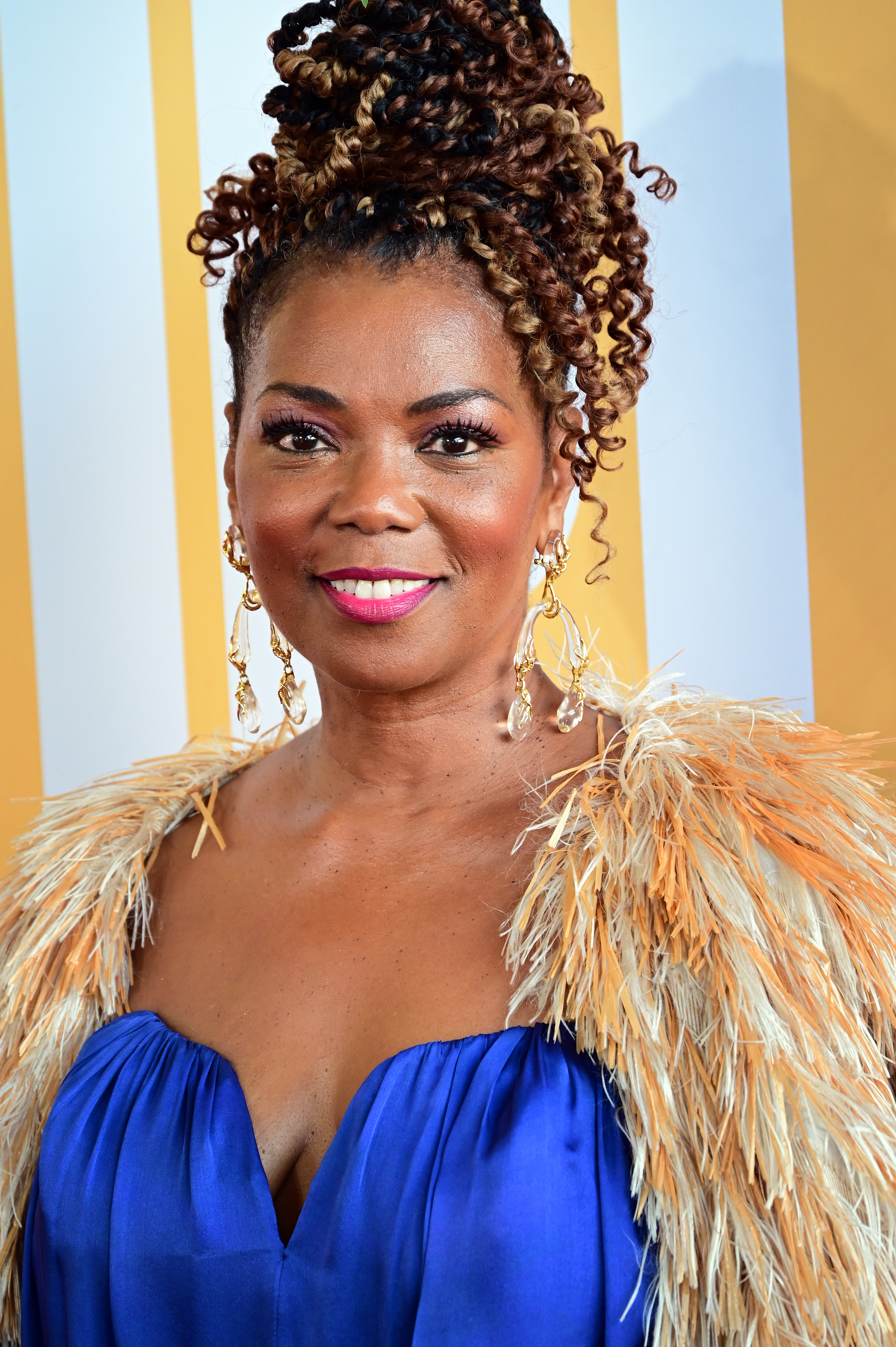
- Williams in 2026
- Born: May 12, 1963 (age 63); Brooklyn, New York, U.S.
- Education: Marymount Manhattan College
- Occupation: Actress
- Years active: 1988–present
- Spouse: Andre Wiseman (m. 1992; sep. 2018)
- Children: 2

Vanessa Estelle Williams (born May 12, 1963) is an American actress and producer. She is best known for her roles as Maxine Joseph–Chadway in the Showtime drama series, Soul Food (2000–2004), for which she received NAACP Image Award for Outstanding Actress in a Drama Series and as Nino Brown's feisty gun moll, Keisha in the 1991 crime drama film, New Jack City. Williams is also known for her role as Anne-Marie McCoy in the first and fourth of the Candyman films, and as Rhonda Blair in the first season of the Fox prime time soap opera Melrose Place (1992–93).

== Early life and education ==
Williams was born on May 12, 1963, and raised in Brooklyn, New York. Williams has three brothers and 1 sister. Her mother, Verdell, died when she was 10 years old leaving Williams to be raised by her grandmother. Her father died in 2016. She has traced her ancestry back to Georgia and Virginia. After high school she went on to get a bachelor's degree in theater and business management from Marymount Manhattan College. A 2011 analysis of her mitochondrial DNA revealed that her maternal ancestry traced to the Tikar people and Bamileke people of Cameroon.

== Career ==
Williams went into acting in films and television. Her acting ran into name conflict with singer/actress and 1984 Miss America Vanessa Williams (also born 1963). Screen Actors Guild rules prohibit duplicate stage names. Vanessa Estelle had registered the name "Vanessa Williams" first, so as a compromise, the former Miss America was occasionally credited as "Vanessa L. Williams" in acting credits. To compound the confusion, both actresses starred in versions of the drama Soul Food (Vanessa L. Williams in the film version, and Vanessa E. Williams in its TV series adaptation). The Screen Actors Guild eventually took the issue to arbitration and decided both actresses could use the professional name "Vanessa Williams".

=== Television ===
Williams began her acting career in 1989, appearing in episodes of The Cosby Show and Law & Order. In 1992, she was cast as Rhonda Blair, the first and only black regular character, in the Fox prime time soap opera, Melrose Place. She was written off after only one season for lack of direction. "I think they didn't make the effort to equip themselves [to write for a black character], either by hiring a black writer or asking me things," said Williams later.

She later had guest starring roles on NYPD Blue and Living Single, before she was cast as a series regular in the ABC legal drama, Murder One (1995–1996) created by Steven Bochco. She received her first nomination for an NAACP Image Award for Outstanding Supporting Actress in a Drama Series for her performance on the show. In 1996, Williams had a recurring role as Dr. Grace Carr in the CBS medical drama series, Chicago Hope, for which she received an NAACP Image Award for Outstanding Actress in a Drama Series nomination.

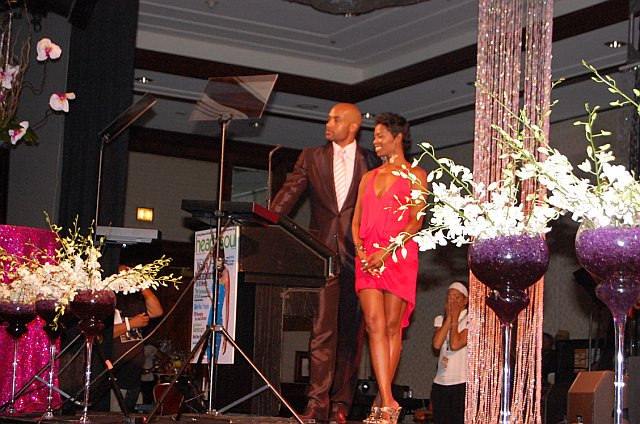
Williams with Boris Kodjoe in 2011

In 2000, Williams was cast as Maxine Chadway in the Showtime drama series Soul Food, a continuation of the successful 1997 film of the same name. Two other leads were played by Nicole Ari Parker and Malinda Williams. In the 1997 film, Vanessa L. Williams played the leading role of Teri Joseph, and Vivica A. Fox played Maxine. For her performance, Williams won an NAACP Image Award for Outstanding Actress in a Drama Series in 2003, and received three additional nominations. The series aired to 2004 and went on to be the longest running drama with a predominantly black cast in the history of American prime-time television.

After Soul Food, Williams had guest starring roles on Cold Case, Knight Rider and Lincoln Heights. In 2015, she was cast in a recurring role of Iris West's mother in The CW drama series, The Flash. In October 2016, it was announced she was cast in the role of Valerie Grant on the NBC soap opera, Days of Our Lives. In 2020, she was cast in a recurring role as Pippa Pascal in the second season The L Word: Generation Q, a role which she reprised for season three.

=== Film ===
In film, Williams is best known for playing Keisha in the 1991 crime thriller New Jack City opposite Wesley Snipes and Ice T. She is also known for playing Anne-Marie McCoy in the 1992 horror film Candyman opposite Tony Todd and Virginia Madsen. The following years she had small parts in Drop Squad (1994), Mother (1996), Punks (2000), Like Mike (2002), and Imagine That (2009) alongside Soul Food co-star Nicole Ari Parker. Williams has also starred in a number of made for television movies, including Emmy Award-nominated performance in Our America (2002). She also had roles in several smaller productions in recent years. In 2021, she returned to her role of Anne-Marie McCoy in the fourth film in the Candyman film series.

== Personal life ==
Williams married Andre Wiseman in November 1992 when the couple eloped. The couple have two sons together: Omar Tafari (March 5, 1997) and Haile Zion Ali (born 2003). In April 2018, Williams filed for divorce from Wiseman for the second time.

== Filmography ==
=== Film ===
Year	Title	Role	Notes
1991	New Jack City	Keisha	
1992	Candyman	Anne-Marie McCoy	
1994	Drop Squad	Mali	
1996	Mother	Donna	
1997	Breakdown	-	Short
1997	A Woman of Color	Thandi Kota	TV movie
1999	Incognito	Wilhelmina Hunter	TV movie
2000	Punks	Jennifer	
2000	Playing with Fire	Riana Roberts	TV movie
2002	Our America	Sandra Williams	TV movie
2002	Like Mike	Pharmacist	
2002	Baby of the Family	Gloria	
2003	Black Listed	J.W.	Video
2003	Allergic to Nuts	Jennie	Short
2005	Gift for the Living	Voiceover	Short
2007	Ice Spiders	Dr. April Sommers	TV movie
2007	Drawing Angel	Thulani	Short
2008	Hummingbird	Donya	Short
2008	Flirting with Forty	Kristine	TV movie
2009	Imagine That	Lori Strother	
2009	Contradictions of the Heart	Lea	Video
2010	5150	TJ	Short
2011	A Mother's Love	Rochelle Richardson	
2012	Sugar Mommas	Lynn	TV movie
2012	Raising Izzie	Tonya Freeman	TV movie
2012	Something Like a Butterfly	Vonda	Short
2013	The Get Away	Lisa	Short
2013	And Then...	Baybee	Short
2014	Men, Money & Gold Diggers	Sandra Winslow	TV movie
2014	The Last Piece	Phone Voice (voice)	Short
2014	Crossed the Line	Juice	
2016	The Secret She Kept	Beverly	TV movie
2016	Diva Diaries	Alex	
2018	Thriller	Mrs. Walker	
2019	One Fine Christmas	Susan	TV movie
2019	I Left My Girlfriend for Regina Jones	Rebecca	
2021	Candyman	Anne-Marie McCoy	
2022	Singleholic	Jackie Chisholm	
2022	Mid-Century	Beverly Gordon	
2022	Remember Me: The Mahalia Jackson Story	Lucille	
2023	Angie's Cure	Carla	
2023	Cruel Encounters	Corynne	TV movie
2023	Black Girl Erupted	Cassandra Cole	

=== Television ===
Year	Title	Role	Notes
1989	Dream Street	Tori	Episode: "Pilot"
1989–1991	The Cosby Show	Jade/Cheryl	Recurring Cast: Season 5 & 7
1990	Law & Order	Vera	Episode: "Happily Ever After"
1992–1993	Melrose Place	Rhonda Blair	Main Cast: Season 1
1995	NYPD Blue	Kira	Episode: "Don We Now Our Gay Apparel"
1995	Living Single	Hellura	Episode: "Another Saturday Night"
1995–1996	Murder One	Lila	Main Cast: Season 1
1996	Buddies	Janice Rollins	Episode: "Marry Me... Sort Of"
1996	Malcolm & Eddie	Stephanie	Episode: "Big Brother Is Watching"
1996	Chicago Hope	Dr. Grace Carr	Recurring Cast: Season 3
1997	Jungle Cubs	Trech (voice)	Episode: "The Ape That Would Be King"
1997	Between Brothers	Rebecca	Episode: "The Interview"
1998	The Pretender	Denise Clements	Episode: "Collateral Damage"
1998	The Steve Harvey Show	Nina	Episode: "Rent"
1999	Total Recall 2070	Violet Whims	Episode: "Self-Inflicted"
2000–2004	Soul Food	Maxine Chadway	Main Cast
2001	Heavy Gear: The Animated Series	Sonja Briggs (voice)	Recurring Cast: Season 1
2003	E! True Hollywood Story	Herself	Episode: "Melrose Place"
2007	Cold Case	Crystal Stacy	Episode: "Shuffle, Ball Change"
2008–2009	Lincoln Heights	Naomi Bradshaw	Guest Cast: Season 3–4
2009	Knight Rider	Ambassador Olara Kumali	Episode: "Don't Stop the Knight" & "Day Turns Into Knight"
2009	Everybody Hates Chris	Tallulah Lafitte	Episode: "Everybody Hates Bomb Threats"
2015–2020	The Bay	Mayor Cleo Harris	Recurring Cast: Season 4, Guest: Season 6
2015–2023	The Flash	Francine West	Recurring Cast: Season 2, Guest: Season 3 & 9
2016–2022	Days of Our Lives	Valerie Grant	Regular Cast
2017	Unsung Hollywood	Herself	Episode: "Ice-T"
2017	Major Crimes	Zora Sax	Episode: "Intersection"
2017–2018	Famous in Love	Ida Turner	Recurring Cast
2018	40 and Single	Bertha Brown	Main Cast
2018	A Luv Tale: The Series	Candice	Main Cast
2020	Two Degrees	Vanessa	Episode: "Bonus Adults"
2021	American Horror Stories	Eleanor Berger	Episode : "Ba'al"
2021–2022	9-1-1	Claudette Collins	Recurring Cast: Season 5
2021–2023	The L Word: Generation Q	Pippa Pascal	Recurring Cast: Season 2, Guest: Season 3

== Awards and nominations ==
Year	Awards	Category	Recipient	Outcome
1993	Fangoria	Fangoria Chainsaw Award for Best Supporting Actress	Candyman	Nominated
1996	NAACP Image Awards	NAACP Image Award for Outstanding Supporting Actress in a Drama Series	Murder One	Nominated
1997	NAACP Image Awards	NAACP Image Award for Outstanding Actress in a Drama Series	Chicago Hope	Nominated
2001	NAACP Image Awards	NAACP Image Award for Outstanding Actress in a Drama Series	Soul Food	Nominated
2003	Daytime Emmy Award	Daytime Emmy Award for Outstanding Performer in a Children's Special	Our America	Nominated
2003	Black Reel Awards	Black Reel Award for Best Supporting Actress: Television Movie/Cable	Our America	Nominated
2003	NAACP Image Awards	NAACP Image Award for Outstanding Actress in a Drama Series	Soul Food	Won
2004	NAACP Image Awards	NAACP Image Award for Outstanding Actress in a Drama Series	Soul Food	Nominated
2005	NAACP Image Awards	NAACP Image Award for Outstanding Actress in a Drama Series	Soul Food	Nominated
2009	NAACP Image Awards	NAACP Image Award for Outstanding Actress in a Television Movie, Mini-Series or Dramatic Special	Flirting with Forty	Nominated
2013	Black Reel Awards	Black Reel Award for Best Actress: T.V. Movie/Cable	Raising Izzie	Nominated
