= NAACP Image Award for Outstanding Actress in a Drama Series =

American television award

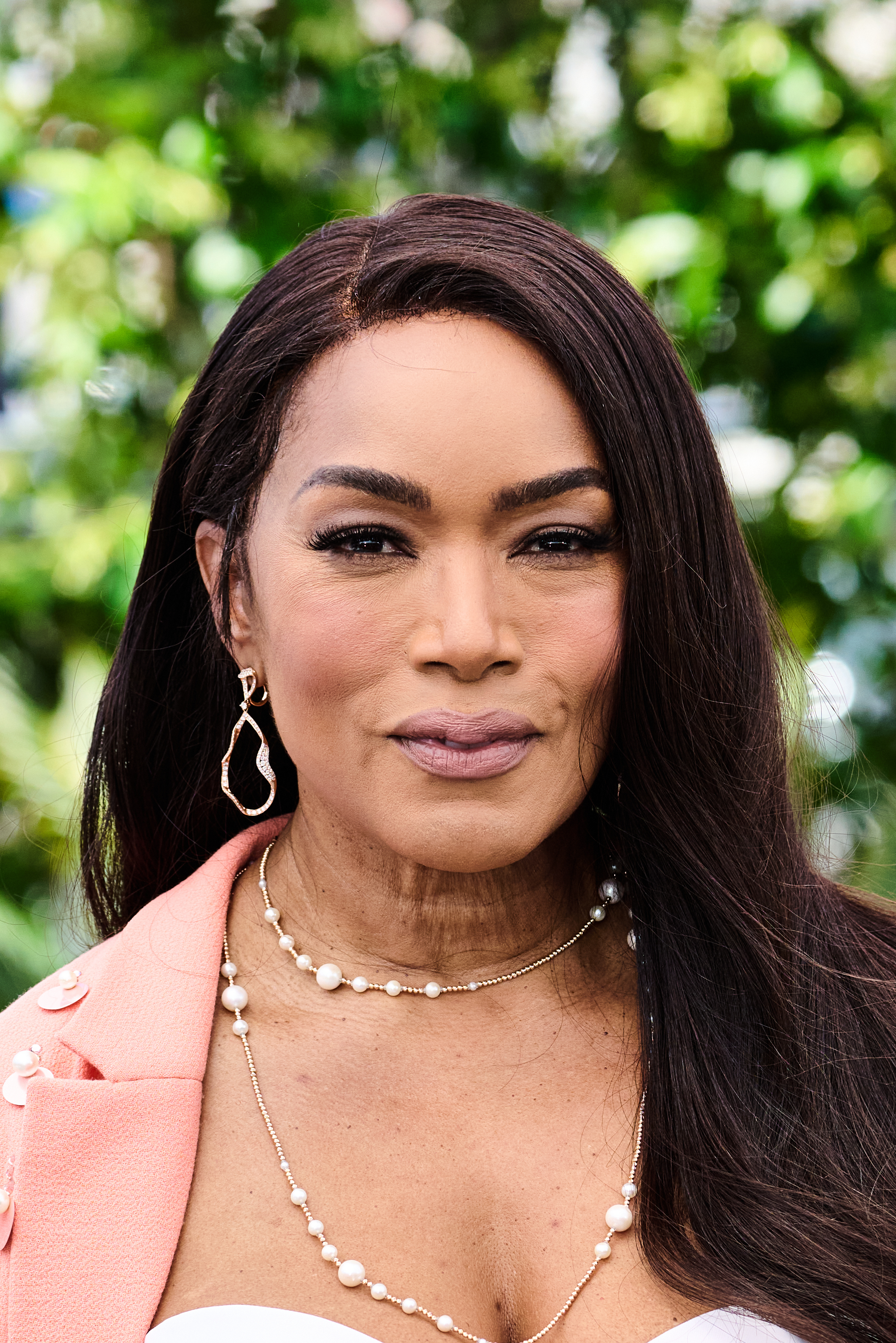
- The 2026 recipient: Angela Bassett
- Awarded for: Outstanding Actress in a Drama Series
- Country: United States
- Presented by: NAACP
- First award: 1970
- Currently held by: Angela Bassett; 9-1-1 (2026)

Highlights
- Most awards: Della Reese (7)
- Most nominations: Angela Bassett; Viola Davis; Della Reese; (7 each)
- Website: naacpimageawards.net

This article lists the winners and nominees for the NAACP Image Award for Outstanding Actress in a Drama Series. Not to be confused with the Award for Outstanding Actress in a Television Movie, Mini-Series or Dramatic Special. Currently, Della Reese holds the record for most wins in the category with seven.

== Winners and nominees ==
Winners are listed first and highlighted in bold.

=== 1970s ===
Year	Actress	Series	Ref
1970
1970	**Judy Pace**	**The Young Lawyers**	
1971
1971	**Elena Verdugo**	**Marcus Welby, M.D.**	
1972 – 79	—N/a		

=== 1980s ===
Year	Actress	Series	Ref
1980
1980	**Joan Pringle**	**The White Shadow**	
1981	—N/a		
1982
1982	**Cicely Tyson**	**The Marva Collins Story**	
1983
1983	**Madge Sinclair**	**Trapper John, M.D.**	
1984 – 87	—N/a		
1988
1988	**Cicely Tyson**	**Samaritan: The Mitch Snyder Story**	
1989
1989	**Alfre Woodard**	**Unnatural Causes**	
1989	Anne-Marie Johnson	In the Heat of the Night	
1989	Beah Richards	Frank's Place	
1989	Holly Robinson	21 Jump Street	
1989	Lynn Whitfield	Heartbeat	

=== 1990s ===
Year	Actress	Series	Ref
1990
1990	**Alfre Woodard**	**Mandela**	
1991	—N/a		
1992
1992	**Alfre Woodard**	**A Mother's Courage: The Mary Thomas Story**	
1993
1993	**Lynn Whitfield**	**The Josephine Baker Story**	
1994
1994	**Regina Taylor**	**I'll Fly Away**	
1994	Della Reese	Picket Fences	
1994	Denise Nicholas	In the Heat of the Night	
1994	Hattie Winston	Homefront	
1994	Victoria Dillard	TriBeCa	
1995	—N/a		
1996
1996	**Della Reese**	**Touched by an Angel**	
1996	Vanessa Bell Calloway	Under One Roof	
1996	Victoria Rowell	Diagnosis: Murder	
1996	Cree Summer	Sweet Justice	
1996	Cicely Tyson	Sweet Justice	
1997
1997	**Della Reese**	**Touched by an Angel**	
1997	S. Epatha Merkerson	Law & Order	
1997	Gloria Reuben	ER	
1997	Lauren Velez	New York Undercover	
1997	Vanessa Estelle Williams	Chicago Hope	
1998
1998	**Della Reese**	**Touched by an Angel**	
1998	Vanessa Bell Calloway	Orleans	
1998	Shari Headley	413 Hope St.	
1998	S. Epatha Merkerson	Law & Order	
1998	Lauren Velez	New York Undercover	
1999
1999	**Della Reese**	**Touched by an Angel**	
1999	Victoria Rowell	Diagnosis: Murder	
1999	Rita Moreno	Oz	
1999	Lorraine Toussaint	Any Day Now	
1999	S. Epatha Merkerson	Law & Order	

=== 2000s ===
Year	Actress	Series	Ref
2000
2000	**Della Reese**	**Touched by an Angel**	
2000	Michael Michele	Homicide: Life on the Street	
2000	Rita Moreno	Oz	
2000	Victoria Rowell	Diagnosis: Murder	
2000	Lorraine Toussaint	Any Day Now	
2001
2001	**Della Reese**	**Touched by an Angel**	
2001	Lorraine Toussaint	Any Day Now	
2001	Nicole Ari Parker	Soul Food	
2001	S. Epatha Merkerson	Law & Order	
2001	Vanessa Estelle Williams	Soul Food	
2002
2002	**Della Reese**	**Touched by an Angel**	
2002	Nicole Ari Parker	Soul Food	
2002	Loretta Devine	Boston Public	
2002	Tangi Miller	Felicity	
2002	Lorraine Toussaint	Any Day Now	
2003
2003	**Vanessa Estelle Williams**	**Soul Food**	
2003	Nicole Ari Parker	Soul Food	
2003	C. C. H. Pounder	The Shield	
2003	Lorraine Toussaint	Any Day Now	
2003	Malinda Williams	Soul Food	
2004
2004	**Nia Long**	**Third Watch**	
2004	Nicole Ari Parker	Soul Food	
2004	C. C. H. Pounder	The Shield	
2004	Malinda Williams	Soul Food	
2004	Vanessa Estelle Williams	Soul Food	
2005
2005	**Nia Long**	**Third Watch**	
2005	Nicole Ari Parker	Soul Food	
2005	Vivica A. Fox	1-800-Missing	
2005	Malinda Williams	Soul Food	
2005	Vanessa Estelle Williams	Soul Food	
2006
2006	**Vivica A. Fox**	**1-800-Missing**	
2006	Khandi Alexander	CSI: Miami	
2006	Kimberly Elise	Close to Home	
2006	Marianne Jean-Baptiste	Without a Trace	
2006	C. C. H. Pounder	The Shield	
2007
2007	**Kimberly Elise**	**Close to Home**	
2007	Jennifer Beals	The L Word	
2007	C. C. H. Pounder	The Shield	
2007	Roselyn Sanchez	Without a Trace	
2007	Regina Taylor	The Unit	
2008
2008	**Regina Taylor**	**The Unit**	
2008	Jennifer Beals	The L Word	
2008	Wendy Davis	Army Wives	
2008	Nicki Micheaux	Lincoln Heights	
2008	C. C. H. Pounder	The Shield	
2009
2009	**Chandra Wilson**	**Grey's Anatomy**	
2009	Wendy Davis	Army Wives	
2009	Loretta Devine	Eli Stone	
2009	Nicki Micheaux	Lincoln Heights	
2009	C. C. H. Pounder	The Shield	

=== 2010s ===
Year	Actress	Series	Ref
2010
2010	**Jada Pinkett Smith**	**HawthoRNe**	
2010	Regina King	Southland	
2010	Sandra Oh	Grey's Anatomy	
2010	Jill Scott	The No. 1 Ladies' Detective Agency	
2010	Chandra Wilson	Grey's Anatomy	
2011
2011	**Regina King**	**Southland**	
2011	Wendy Davis	Army Wives	
2011	Gugu Mbatha-Raw	Undercovers	
2011	Jada Pinkett Smith	HawthoRNe	
2011	Chandra Wilson	Grey's Anatomy	
2012
2012	**Regina King**	**Southland**	
2012	Khandi Alexander	Treme	
2012	Taraji P. Henson	Person of Interest	
2012	Sandra Oh	Grey's Anatomy	
2012	Chandra Wilson	Grey's Anatomy	
2013
2013	**Kerry Washington**	**Scandal**	
2013	Khandi Alexander	Treme	
2013	Regina King	Southland	
2013	Sandra Oh	Grey's Anatomy	
2013	Chandra Wilson	Grey's Anatomy	
2014
2014	**Kerry Washington**	**Scandal**	
2014	Khandi Alexander	Treme	
2014	Nicole Beharie	Sleepy Hollow	
2014	Regina King	Southland	
2014	Chandra Wilson	Grey's Anatomy	
2015
2015	**Viola Davis**	**How to Get Away with Murder**	
2015	Nicole Beharie	Sleepy Hollow	
2015	Octavia Spencer	Red Band Society	
2015	Gabrielle Union	Being Mary Jane	
2015	Kerry Washington	Scandal	
2016
2016	**Taraji P. Henson**	**Empire**	
2016	Nicole Beharie	Sleepy Hollow	
2016	Viola Davis	How to Get Away with Murder	
2016	Gabrielle Union	Being Mary Jane	
2016	Kerry Washington	Scandal	
2017
2017	**Taraji P. Henson**	**Empire**	
2017	Viola Davis	How to Get Away with Murder	
2017	Jurnee Smollett-Bell	Underground	
2017	Kerry Washington	Scandal	
2017	Rutina Wesley	Queen Sugar	
2018
2018	**Taraji P. Henson**	**Empire**	
2018	Jurnee Smollett-Bell	Underground	
2018	Kerry Washington	Scandal	
2018	Rutina Wesley	Queen Sugar	
2018	Viola Davis	How to Get Away with Murder	
2019
2019	**Taraji P. Henson**	**Empire**	
2019	Alfre Woodard	Luke Cage	
2019	Naturi Naughton	Power	
2019	Viola Davis	How to Get Away with Murder	
2019	Rutina Wesley	Queen Sugar	

=== 2020s ===
Year	Actress	Series	Ref
2020
2020	**Angela Bassett**	**9-1-1**	
2020	Viola Davis	How to Get Away with Murder	
2020	Regina King	Watchmen	
2020	Simone Missick	All Rise	
2020	Rutina Wesley	Queen Sugar	
2021
2021	**Viola Davis**	**How to Get Away with Murder**	
2021	Angela Bassett	9-1-1	
2021	Simone Missick	All Rise	
2021	Jurnee Smollett	Lovecraft Country	
2021	Brandee Evans	P-Valley	
2022
2022	**Angela Bassett**	**9-1-1**	
2022	Dawn-Lyen Gardner	Queen Sugar	
2022	Octavia Spencer	Truth Be Told	
2022	Queen Latifah	The Equalizer (2021 TV series)	
2022	Rutina Wesley	Queen Sugar	
2023
2023	**Angela Bassett**	**9-1-1**	
2023	Brandee Evans	P-Valley	
2023	Queen Latifah	The Equalizer (2021 TV series)	
2023	Rutina Wesley	Queen Sugar	
2023	Zendaya	Euphoria	
2024
2024	**India Amarteifio**	**Queen Charlotte: A Bridgerton Story**	
2024	Angela Bassett	9-1-1	
2024	Octavia Spencer	Truth Be Told	
2024	Queen Latifah	The Equalizer	
2024	Zoe Saldaña	Special Ops: Lioness	
2025
2025	**Queen Latifah**	**The Equalizer**	
2025	Angela Bassett	9-1-1	
2025	Emayatzy Corinealdi	Reasonable Doubt	
2025	Shanola Hampton	Found	
2025	Zoe Saldaña	Lioness	
2026
2026	**Angela Bassett**	**9-1-1**	
2026	Emayatzy Corinealdi	Reasonable Doubt	
2026	Lovie Simone	Forever	
2026	Patina Miller	Power Book III: Raising Kanan	
2026	Queen Latifah	The Equalizer	

== Multiple wins and nominations ==
=== Wins ===
7 wins

- Della Reese

4 wins

- Taraji P. Henson

3 wins

- Angela Bassett
- Alfre Woodard

2 wins

- Viola Davis
- Regina King
- Nia Long
- Regina Taylor
- Cicely Tyson
- Kerry Washington
- Lynn Whitfield

=== Nominations ===
7 nominations

- Angela Bassett
- Viola Davis
- Della Reese

6 nominations

- Regina King
- C. C. H. Pounder
- Chandra Wilson
- Kerry Washington

5 nominations

- Taraji P. Henson
- Queen Latifah
- Nicole Ari Parker
- Lorraine Toussaint
- Vanessa A. Williams
- Rutina Wesley

4 nominations

- Khandi Alexander
- S. Epatha Merkerson

3 nominations

- Nicole Beharie
- Wendy Davis
- Sandra Oh
- Victoria Rowell
- Jurnee Smollett
- Regina Taylor
- Malinda Williams
- Cicely Tyson
- Alfre Woodard
- Angela Bassett

2 nominations

- Jennifer Beals
- Vanessa Bell Calloway
- Emayatzy Corinealdi
- Loretta Devine
- Kimberly Elise
- Vivica A. Fox
- Nia Long
- Simone Missick
- Nicki Micheaux
- Rita Moreno
- Zoe Saldaña
- Jada Pinkett Smith
- Octavia Spencer
- Gabrielle Union
- Lynn Whitfield
- Lauren Velez
