= Jane Porter (American novelist) =

American author of contemporary romance and women's fiction (*1960)

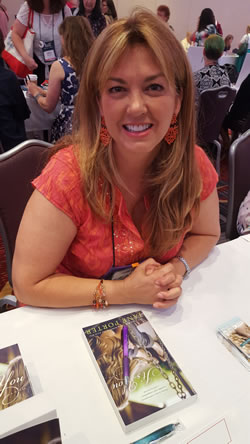
- Jane Porter at Romance Writers of America Conference, New York, NY, July 2015
- Education: BA University of California, Los Angeles; MA University of San Francisco
- Occupation: Novelist
- Writing career
- Pen name: Jane Porter
- Period: 2000–present
- Genre: Romance
- Notable works: Take Me, Cowboy
- Notable awards: RITA award – Best Romance Novella; 2014 Take Me, Cowboy
- Website: janeporter.com

Jane Porter is an American author of contemporary romance and women's fiction. She is a New York Times and USA Today bestselling author of over forty-five titles, with over 12 million books in print, in 20 languages and in 25 countries. Her novel Flirting with Forty was made into the Lifetime movie of the same name starring Heather Locklear. In 2014, she received the Romance Writers of America RITA Award for Best Romance Novella for Take Me, Cowboy.

== Biography ==
Porter was born in Visalia, California. She earned a bachelor's degree from UCLA in American Studies, as well as Masters in Writing from the University of San Francisco.

She has worked in sales and marketing, as well as a director of a non-profit foundation and teacher of Jr. high and High school English. She sold her first novel, The Italian Groom, to Harlequin in 2000.

In 2005, Porter branched into women's fiction with the publication of The Frog Prince.

Porter founded Tule publishing in 2013.

She resides in San Clemente, California with her husband and three sons.

== Bibliography ==
=== Bellevue Wives ===
1. Odd Mom Out. Grand Central. September 2007 [2007]. ISBN 9781615566662.
2. Mrs. Perfect. Grand Central. May 2008 [2008]. ISBN 9781615566679.
3. Porter, Jane (July 2009) [2009]. Easy on the Eyes. Grand Central. ISBN 9780446509404.

=== A Brennan Sisters Novel ===
1. The Good Woman. Berkley. September 2012 [2012]. ISBN 9780425253007.
2. The Good Daughter. Berkley. February 2013 [2013]. ISBN 9780425253427.
3. The Good Wife. Berkley. September 2013 [2013]. ISBN 9780425253670.

=== The Desert Kings ===
1. The Sheikh's Chosen Queen. Harlequin. April 2008 [2008]. ISBN 9780373127177.
2. King Of The Desert, Captive Bride. Harlequin. May 2008 [2008]. ISBN 9780373127252.
3. Duty, Desire and the Desert King. Harlequin. December 2009 [2009]. ISBN 9780373128808.

=== The Disgraced Copelands ===
1. The Fallen Greek Bride. Harlequin. February 2013 [2013]. ISBN 9780373131297.
2. His Defiant Desert Queen. Harlequin. February 2015 [2015]. ISBN 9780373133253.

=== The Galvan Brides ===
1. In Dante's Debt. Harlequin. January 2003 [2003]. ISBN 9780373122981.
2. Lazaro's Revenge. Harlequin. February 2003 [2003]. ISBN 9780373123049.
3. The Latin Lover's Secret Child. Harlequin. November 2003 [2003]. ISBN 9780373123582.
4. The Spaniard's Passion. Harlequin. December 2003 [2003]. ISBN 9780373123636.

=== Princess Brides ===
1. The Sultan's Bought Bride. Harlequin. September 2004 [2004]. ISBN 9780373124183.
2. The Greek's Royal Mistress. Harlequin. October 2004 [2004]. ISBN 9780373124244.
3. The Italian's Virgin Princess. Harlequin. November 2004 [2004]. ISBN 9780373124305.

=== A Royal Scandal ===
1. Not Fit for a King?. Harlequin. May 2012 [2012]. ISBN 9780373130757.
2. His Majesty's Mistake. Harlequin. June 2012 [2012]. ISBN 9780373130818.

=== Taming of the Sheenans ===
1. Christmas at Copper Mountain. Tule Publishing Group. November 2013 [2013].
2. Tycoon's Kiss. Tule Publishing Group. April 2014 [2014].
3. The Kidnapped Christmas Bride. Tule Publishing Group. November 2014 [2014]. ISBN 9781942240259.

=== Stand alone works ===
- The Italian Groom. Harlequin. March 2001 [2001]. ISBN 9780373121687.
- Christos's Promise. Harlequin. October 2001 [2001]. ISBN 9780373122103.
- The Secret. Harlequin. 2002. ISBN 9780373612673.
- The Sheikh's Wife. Harlequin. May 2002 [2002]. ISBN 9780373122523.
- Marco's Pride. Harlequin. February 2004 [2004]. ISBN 9780373123759.
- The Sheikh's Virgin. Harlequin. 2005. ISBN 9780373124732.
- The Frog Prince. Grand Central. May 2005 [2005]. ISBN 9780446694490.
- The Secretary's Seduction. Harlequin. August 2005 [2005]. ISBN 9780373820139.
- Taken By the Highest Bidder. Harlequin. December 2005 [2005]. ISBN 9780373125081.
- The Sicilian's Defiant Mistress. Harlequin. February 2006 [2006]. ISBN 9780373125203.
- The Sheikh's Disobedient Bride. Harlequin. June 2006 [2006]. ISBN 9780373125425.
- Flirting With Forty. Grand Central. July 2006 [2006]. ISBN 9781615591985.
- Hollywood Husband, Contract Wife. Harlequin. October 2006 [2006]. ISBN 9780373125746.
- At the Greek Boss's Bidding. Harlequin. April 2007 [2007]. ISBN 9780373126231.
- Porter, Jane (August 2010) [2010]. She's Gone Country. Grand Central. ISBN 9780446509411.
- A Dark Sicilian Secret. Harlequin. January 2011 [2011]. ISBN 9780373130078.
- Be Mine, Cowboy. Harlequin. February 2013 [2013]. ISBN 9780373754427. (in My Cowboy Valentine)
- Take Me, Cowboy. Tule Publishing Group. October 2013 [2013]. ISBN 9781940296012.
- It's You. Berkley. June 2015 [2015]. ISBN 9780425277157.

=== Anthologies and short stories ===
- The Italian's Blackmailed Bride. Harlequin. December 2006 [2006]. ISBN 9780373837380. in One Christmas Night
- One Christmas Night in Venice. December 2011 [2011]. in Mistletoe Wishes
- Mistaken for a Mistress. Harlequin. May 2007 [2007]. ISBN 9781426801532.

=== Non-fiction ===
- Writing The Bestseller: Romantic And Commercial Fiction. Tule Publishing Group. January 2014 [2014]. with Rebecca Lyles

== Awards and reception ==
- 2006 - Romance Reviews Today for Best Contemporary Novel for Flirting with Forty
- 2013 - Golden Leaf Award for Best Novel with Romantic Elements for The Good Daughter
- 2014 - Romance Writers of America RITA Award for Best Romance Novella for Take Me, Cowboy

Porter has garnered a starred review from Library Journal for Flirting with Forty, and several top picks from RT Book Reviews.
