= Return to Two Moon Junction =

- Video release poster
- Directed by: Farhad Mann
- Written by: Dyanne Asimow
- Based on: Characters by Zalman King; MacGregor Douglas
- Produced by: Zalman King
- Starring: Melinda Clarke; John Clayton Schafer; Louise Fletcher
- Cinematography: Frank Byers
- Edited by: Dianne Ryder-Rennolds
- Music by: Joseph Conlan
- Production company: DDM Film Corporation
- Distributed by: Trimark Pictures
- Release date: May 11, 1994
- Running time: 96 minutes
- Country: United States
- Language: English

Return to Two Moon Junction is a 1994 romantic drama film which serves as a sequel to the 1988 film Two Moon Junction. The plot concerns Savannah Delongpre, a New York fashion model who returns to her Georgia home town where she has an affair with local sculptor Jake Gilbert. The film was directed by Farhad Mann, and stars Melinda Clarke, Wendy Davis, and Louise Fletcher.

The movie had a wide cinema release in Russia in summer of 1994.

== Plot ==
Savannah Delongpre is a wealthy runway fashion model living in New York City who returns to her small town in Georgia in order to get away from her stressful and demanding spotlight life and to visit her wealthy grandmother, Belle. While staying with Belle, Savannah views some homemade 8mm films about her childhood past which include her recently deceased mother.

While visiting her childhood home, which includes a swamp property called Two Moon Junction owned by the Delongpre family, Savannah has a run-in with Jake Gilbert, a rugged but good-natured drifter living in a small house on the property. Jake is an artist who comes from a poor family that has had a decades-long feud with the Delongpre family. Unwilling to return to New York right away, Savannah eventually begins a sordid affair with Jake despite their backgrounds. Savannah tries to persuade Jake to come to New York City with her so he can open his own art gallery to display and sell his scrap-metal sculptures. However, the prideful Jake repeatedly refuses because he makes sculptures out of principle rather than for money.

Belle soon learns about Savannah's tryst with Jake and tries, any way she can, to break them up. After failing to bribe Jake to end his tryst with Savannah, Belle tracks down and contacts Savannah's possessive ex-boyfriend Robert Lee. Robert arrives in town and colludes with Belle to break up the relationship by purchasing the Two Moon Junction property and evicting Jake.

Although Savannah manages to prevent the sale from the property, Jake decides that being with Savannah is not for the best and he moves out of the property without saying goodbye. Belle then has a talk with the heartbroken Savannah in which she tells Belle that she really did love Jake.

As Savannah prepares to board a train to return to New York, Belle arrives in her car with Jake who runs and joins Savannah on the train. Belle had previously told Jake the truth about trying to keep them apart. Savannah returns to New York with Jake, who decides to give "big city" life a chance. Belle happily watches them leave town for good.

== Cast ==
- Melinda Clarke as Savannah Delongpre
- John Clayton Schafer as Jake Gilbert
- Louise Fletcher as Belle Delongpre
- Wendy Davis as Roni
- Yorgo Constantine as Robert Lee
- Molly Shannon as Traci
- Montrose Hagins as Ruth
- Bill Hollis as Henry Walker
- Richard Keats as Burt
- James T. Callahan as Mr. Bowman
- David Dunard as Taxi Driver
- Matt Frewer as Cleo/Leo
