= Joseph Bailey (author) =

American psychologist, consultant and public speaker

Joseph Bailey is an American psychologist, consultant and public speaker. He is noted largely for his 1990 book about addiction and treatment, The Serenity Principle and is the author of three other books on mental well-being: Slowing down to the Speed of Life (with best-selling author Richard Carlson), The Speed Trap: Avoiding the Frenzy of the Fast Lane, Slowing Down to the Speed of Love and Fearproof Your Life. Joe Bailey has been a psychotherapist for thirty-five years, and is a consultant to many corporations and healthcare, mental health and chemical dependency organizations. He is a seminar leader and trainer of professionals. His practice of research and teaching an integration of psychological and spiritual health embraces many of his writing partner Richard Carlson's (Don't Sweat the Small Stuff) techniques in addressing a person's innate health, as well as those of Sydney Banks and refined by George Pransky and Roger C. Mills, known as "Health Realization."

Joe Bailey toured nationally to promote Slowing Down to the Speed of Life, The Speed Trap and Slowing Down to the Speed of Love. He has appeared on or been quoted in USA Today, The Chicago Tribune, The St. Paul Pioneer Press, Newsweek, Family Circle, Shape, Reader's Digest, Entrepreneur of the Year Magazine, Bay Area Parent, and The Oregonian. His television and radio interviews include CNBC Nightly News with Brian Williams, NBC Morning Show, New York City, Fox TV Morning Show, Boston, WCCO CBS special on Slowing Down to the Speed of Life, KMSP TV, KARE TV, WCCC radio KBEM Minneapolis, KMHL -MPLS. KNUS-Denver, KBYR-Anchorage, WNYU-New York City, KURV-Texas, WMAQ-Chicago, KUIK0-Portland, OR. KPPT-Newport, OR. Talk America Network, WWRC-Washington D.C., Air America, and numerous other radio talk shows. Bailey is a fly-fishing advocate and runs seminars with his partner George Patterson called "Fly Fishing for the Mind".

== Bibliography ==
Bailey's works are listed in top-level bullet points; some reviews of them are listed in second-level bullet points.

- J. Bailey, Fearproof Your Life: How to Thrive in a World Addicted to Fear, Conari Press 2007. ISBN 1-57324-307-8, ISBN 978-1-57324-307-0
- J. Bailey, Slowing Down to the Speed of Love, McGraw-Hill, 2004. ISBN 0-07-143873-4, ISBN 978-0-07-143873-5
- J. Bailey, The Speed Trap: How to Avoid the Frenzy of the Fast Lane HarperOne 1999. ISBN 0-06-251589-6, ISBN 978-0-06-251589-6
- R. Carlson and J. Bailey, Slowing Down to the Speed of Life, HarperSanFrancisco 1998. ISBN 0-06-251454-7, ISBN 978-0-06-251454-7
  - Veninga, Robert (August 1998). "Is It Possible to Slow Down to the Speed of Life?". Minnesota Medicine. 81. Minneapolis, MN: Minnesota Medical Association: 47. ISSN 0026-556X. Internet Archive minnesotamedicin00minn_4.
- J. Bailey, The Serenity Principle: Finding Inner Peace in Recovery, HarperSanFrancisco, 1990. ISBN 0-06-250039-2, ISBN 978-0-06-250039-7

== Articles ==
- USA Today—Time Stackers, The Ultimate Juggling Act” September 1997
- Family Circle: “Stress Busting—Secrets from the Experts” September 15, 1998
- Newsweek, April 28, 1997: “Drowning in Data” Feeling Overwhelmed by Gadgets?
- Lansing Journal: “Slow Down, do more.” 1/15/98
- Natural Health Magazine: “Inspirations: Deep Listening” Nov/Dec 2003
- Namaste Magazine: “Is the Grass Really Greener on the Other Side of the Fence?” August/July 2001
- Minneapolis Star Tribune December 21, 1997: “Just Saying Yes to Simplicity”
- University of Minnesota, Pictures of Health Winter 2003 “Stop Look and Listen to your hearts: Recharging the Inner Lives of Healers”
- USA Today July 9, 1999, “Not going the Distance, Forget the frenzy. Some vacations are best savored in your own back yard”
