= Wendy Davis (actress) =

American actress

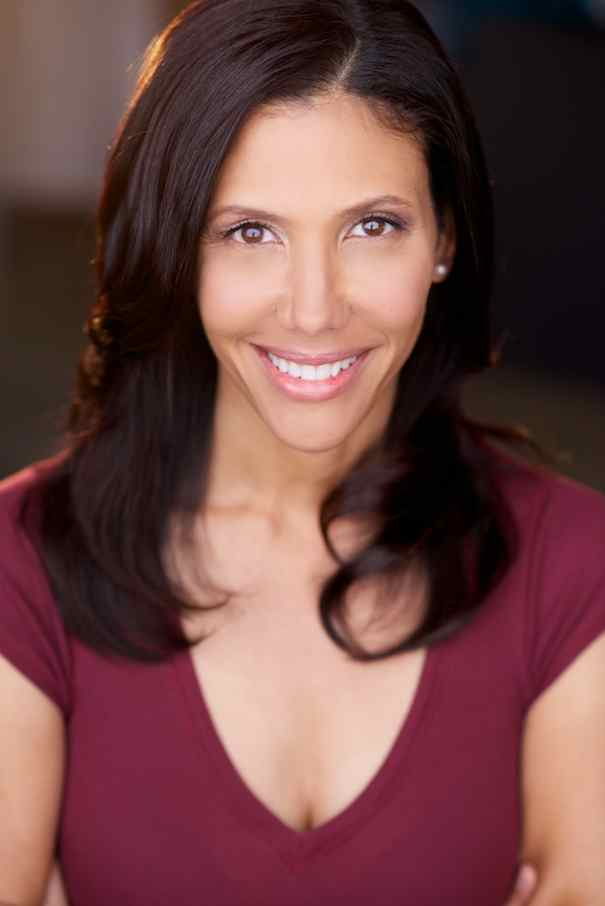
- Davis in 2013
- Education: Howard University
- Occupation: Actress
- Years active: 1980–present
- Spouse: Jacobi Wynne (divorced)
- Children: 1

Wendy Davis is an American actress. She is best known for her role as Colonel Joan Burton in the Lifetime television drama series Army Wives (2007–2013), for which she received three NAACP Image Award for Outstanding Actress in a Drama Series nominations.

== Early life ==
Davis grew up in Joppatowne, Maryland. She attended Joppatowne High School and graduated with a degree in Theater from Howard University.

== Career ==
Davis began her career appearing in television sitcoms. She was semi-regular on the 1991 sitcom The New WKRP in Cincinnati as receptionist Ronnie Lee, and guest starred on Martin, The Sinbad Show , and Coach. From 1996 to 1997, Davis starred as Lynette White in the ABC police drama High Incident created by Steven Spielberg. The series ran two seasons. In the following years, she appeared on television and in independent films, including Return to Two Moon Junction (1995), as well as guest-starring on episodes of Any Day Now, Angel, Cold Case, and Grey's Anatomy.

In 2007, Davis was cast as Colonel Joan Burton in the Lifetime television drama series Army Wives opposite Kim Delaney, Catherine Bell, Sally Pressman and Brigid Brannagh. Davis has also received three NAACP Image Award nominations for her role under the category of "Outstanding Actress in a Drama Series" in 2008, 2009, and 2011. She starred in show from 2007 to 2013, leaving after the season 7 finale. Lifetime later canceled the series after seven seasons.

From 2012 to 2013, Davis had a recurring role as Kimberly Mitchell in the second season of ABC drama series Scandal created by Shonda Rhimes. She later guest starred on Castle, Criminal Minds, NCIS, and Major Crimes. In 2018, she was cast in a series regular role in the Oprah Winfrey Network comedy-drama series Love Is created and produced by Mara Brock Akil and Salim Akil. The series was canceled after one season due to allegations of domestic violence and lifting the idea for the series from an ex-lover against Salim Akil.

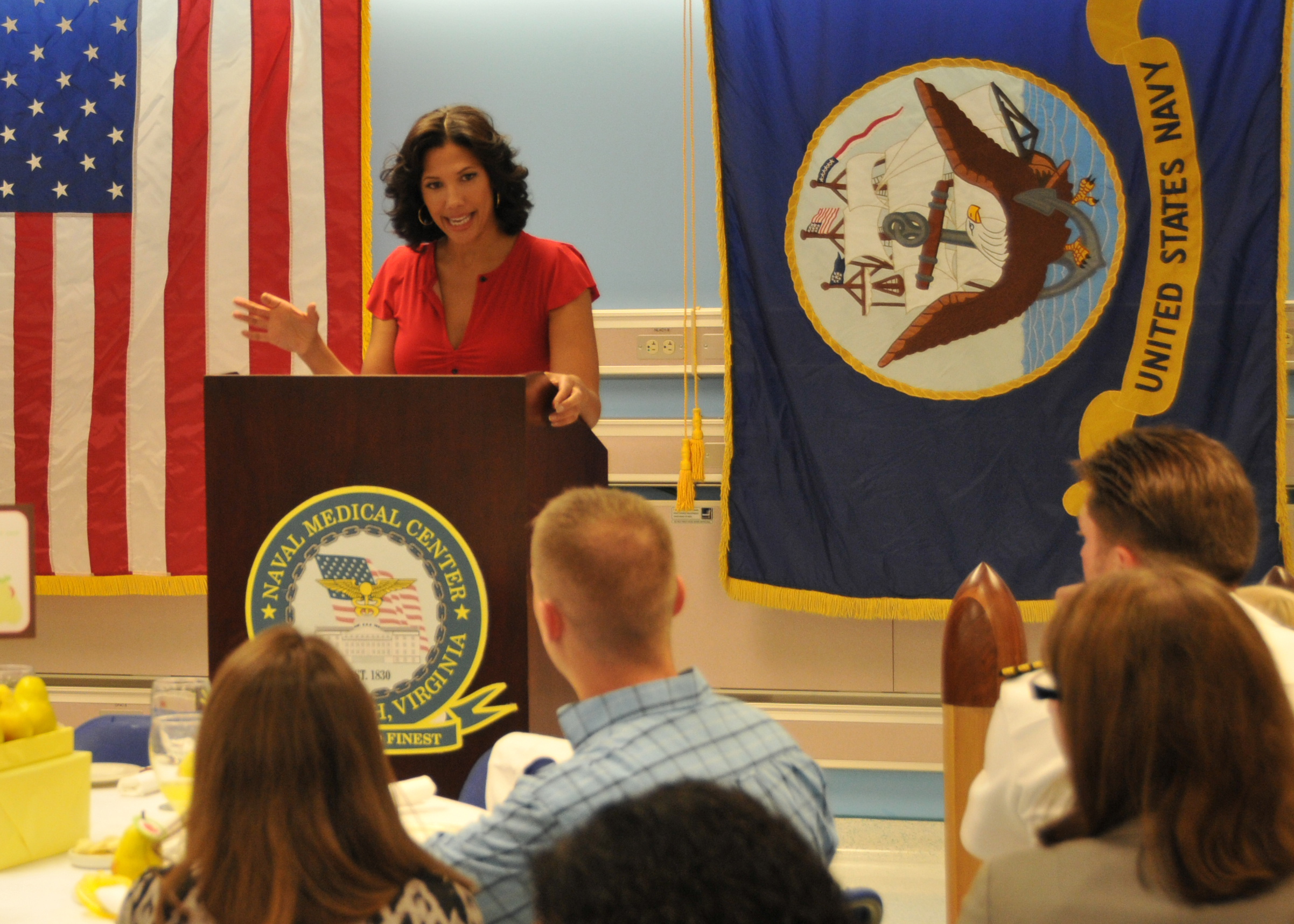
Davis serves as guest speaker during a baby shower at the 2009 Naval Medical Center Portsmouth hosted by the medical facility for mothers of the Neonatal Intensive Care Unit

== Personal life ==
Davis has a daughter with ex-husband Jacobi Wynne. She and her daughter live in Los Angeles CA. In a series of 9 short videos available through the "Understood" website and through YouTube, she discusses growing up with ADHD, how it helped her as an actress, and how she responded to her daughter getting the same diagnosis. The videos are to help parents of children with ADHD, adults with ADHD, and the rest of the population.

== Filmography ==
=== Film ===
Year	Title	Role	Notes
1980	Powder Heads	Reborn #1	
1989	Running Out of Time	Tracy Michelle Gibson	TV movie
1995	Return to Two Moon Junction	Roni	
1996	Brittle Glory	Reporter	
1999	Rendezvous	Jade	TV movie
2001	Fight Girls	Sexy Red	
2001	Taking Back Our Town	Janice Dickerson	TV movie
2002	Trapped: Buried Alive	Monique	TV movie
2002	Mother Ghost	Stacy	
2009	Kid Edition	Cynthia	TV movie
2014	Just a Dream	Sherry	Short
2016	I Know Where Lizzie Is	Melissa Portman	TV movie
2018	Mr. Malevolent	Lucy	
2018	Encounter	Agent Tevis	

=== Television ===
Year	Title	Role	Notes
1991	The New WKRP in Cincinnati	Ronnie Lee	Recurring cast: season 1
1993	Martin	Bobbi	Episode: "Baby, It's You"
1993	The Sinbad Show	Sandy	Episode: "Petty Larceny"
1993	South of Sunset	–	Episode: "Newspaper Boy"
1994	Coach	Julie	Episode: "Like Father, Like Daughter"
1996	EZ Streets	Joan Priestly	Episode: "Pilot"
1996–97	High Incident	Lynette White	Main cast
1997	Between Brothers	Cynthia	Episode: "Family Affair"
1998	Profiler	Mrs. Driscoll	Episode: "Dying to Live"
1998	Smart Guy	Hillary Jordan	Episode: "Beating Is Fundamental"
2000	Any Day Now	Cheryl	Episode: "Lighten Up, Rene"
2001	Cursed	Alice Fullmer	Episode: "...And Then He Got a Rash"
2001	The District	Saundra Dayton	Episode: "The Project"
2002	Angel	Aubrey Jenkins	Episode: "Loyalty"
2005	Cold Case	Julia Owens	Episode: "Ravaged"
2005	Grey's Anatomy	Holly Adams	Episode: "Who's Zoomin' Who?"
2006	Commander in Chief	Karen Patton	Episode: "Unfinished Business"
2007–13	Army Wives	Joan Burton	Main cast
2012–13	Scandal	Kimberly Mitchell	Recurring cast: season 2
2014	Castle	Lt. Delia Burton	Episode: "Under Fire"
2014	Criminal Minds	Dr. Kathleen Benedict	Episode: "Mr. & Mrs. Anderson"
2016	NCIS	Kensington Bloom	Episode: "Sister City: Part 1"
2016	Major Crimes	Sharon's Doctor	Episode: "Off the Wagon"
2017	Sweet/Vicious	–	Episode: "Pure Heroine" & "An Innocent Man"
2018	Designated Survivor	Commander Watkins	Episode: "The Final Frontier"
2018	Love Is	Nuri (2017)	Main cast
2020	Star Trek: Picard	Dr. Kabath	Episode: "Maps and Legends"
2020	Bull	Samara Walton	Episode: "Child of Mine"
2022–23	Bel-Air	Joan	3 episodes

== Awards and nominations ==
- Drama-Logue Award – Talking With
- 2008, Image Awards – Outstanding Actress in a Drama Series Army Wives (Nominated)
- 2009, Image Awards – Outstanding Actress in a Drama Series Army Wives (Nominated)
- 2011, Image Awards – Outstanding Actress in a Drama Series Army Wives (Nominated)
- 2008, Prism Awards – Performance in a Drama Series Multi-Episode Storyline Army Wives (Nominated)
