= James Bright =

American philologist

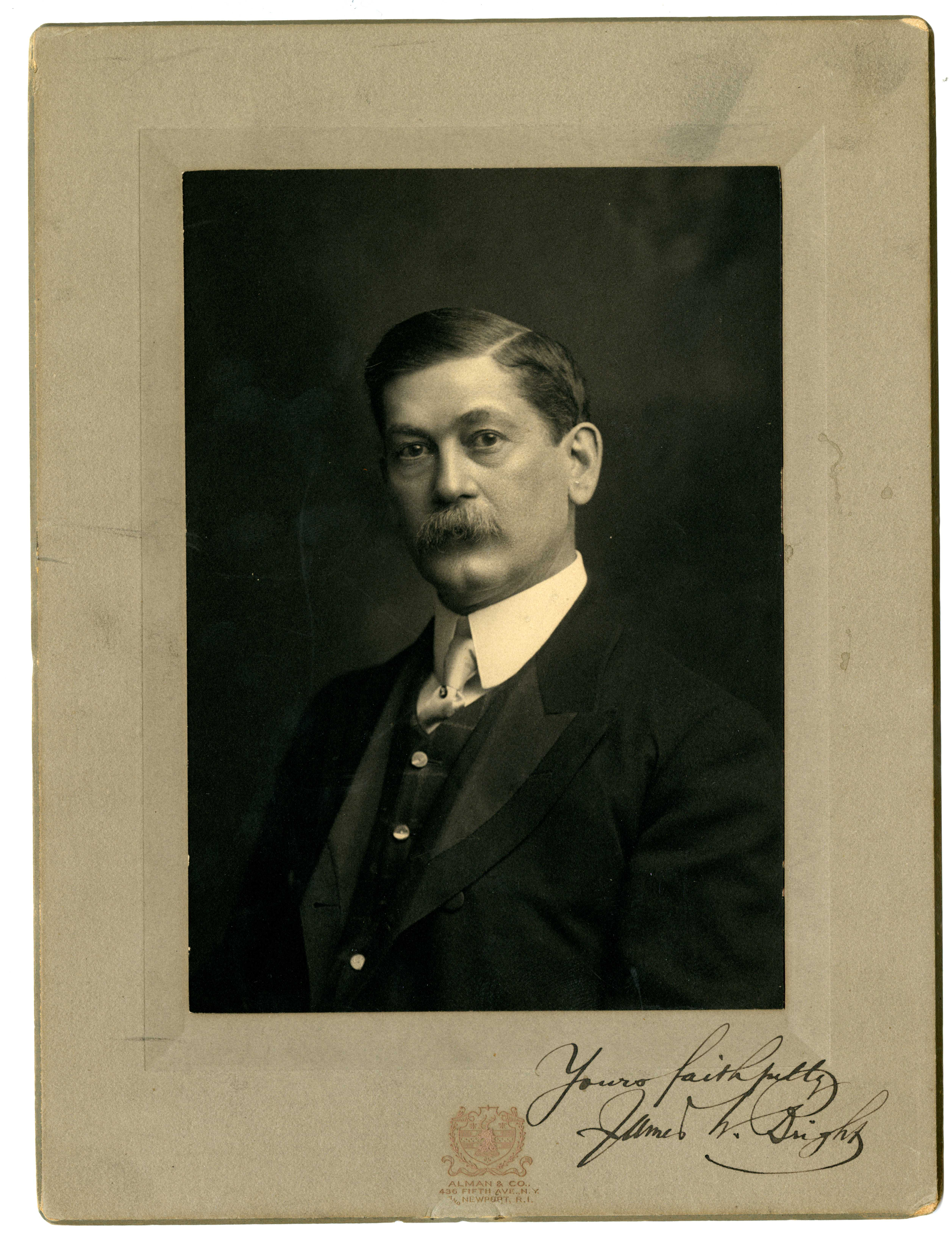
- Born: 1852
- Died: 1926
- Occupations: Philologist, Germanist, anglicist

James Wilson Bright (1852–1926) was an American philologist active in the late nineteenth and early twentieth century. He was a Professor of English Philology at Johns Hopkins University, and specialized in early Germanic languages and Old and Middle English specifically.

== Biography ==
Bright completed his undergraduate education at Lafayette College in Easton, Pennsylvania. During the 1861-1862 school year, a competition was initiated at the school to find the member of the senior class "deemed to be the most proficient in English Philology as demonstrated by a written discussion of the language of some English classic." This competition was called the Fowler Prize, named after famed scholar William Chauncey Fowler who was a friend of the school and created the prize and its $30 reward. In 1876, during the time Bright attended Lafayette, the subject of the prize was the study of American poet William Cullen Bryant. Bright competed in, and won the Fowler Prize this year, and during commencement was awarded the prize by Bryant himself at the graduation ceremony.

Bright was the first person to receive a PhD in English from Johns Hopkins, in 1882. After teaching briefly at Cornell, he returned to Johns Hopkins in 1885, where he oversaw the development of the English program.

Bright became the first occupant of the Caroline Donovan Chair of English, which was established in 1905. He held the chair until his retirement in 1925. His successor as Chairman (though not as Donovan Professor) was John Calvin French.

Bright was an elected member of the American Philosophical Society.

Among Bright's publications was an Anglo-Saxon Reader, whose similarity to the reader published by the more well-known British philologist Henry Sweet prompted Sweet to remark that Bright's work "bears a striking resemblance to an earlier version of my Reader."

=== The James Wilson Bright Collection at Goucher College ===
Bright's 4,000 volume teaching collection of Anglo-Saxon, Middle English, and Early Modern English texts was bought by Goucher College in Baltimore, MD shortly before his death in 1926. The collection records the development of English as a university discipline. Today, it supports research in Early Modern and Modern literature, religion, political science, law, linguistics, and communications.
