= Kristine Carlson =

American author living in California

- Born: Kristine Anderson; July 5, 1963 (age 63); Portland, Oregon, U.S.
- Education: Pepperdine University
- Occupation: Author
- Spouse: Richard Carlson (m. 1981; died 2006)
- Website: dontsweat.com

Kristine Carlson (born July 5, 1963) is an American author. She co-wrote several titles in the Don't Sweat the Small Stuff series with her husband, the self-help author Richard Carlson, and wrote Don't Sweat the Small Stuff in Love and Don't Sweat the Small Stuff for Women. She has served on the board of directors and the Global Leadership Council of Challenge Day.

== Early life and education ==
Carlson was born Kristine Anderson in Portland, Oregon, and is a graduate of Pepperdine University. She lives in California.

== Career ==
Richard Carlson died of a pulmonary embolism on December 13, 2006, at the age of 45. After his death, Carlson published An Hour to Live, an Hour to Love: The True Story of the Best Gift Ever Given in December 2007. The book is built around a letter her husband had written her on their eighteenth wedding anniversary, in which he answered the question of whom he would call if he had one hour left to live; the second half of the book contains her reply. It appeared on The New York Times hardcover nonfiction bestseller list in 2008.

She later wrote Heart Broken Open, a memoir about her grief following her husband's death.

Carlson appeared on The Oprah Winfrey Show on December 5, 2007. She has also appeared on other national television programmes, including Today and The View, and on local news and talk shows.

== Awards ==
In 2010, Carlson received the Kennedy Laureate Award from John F. Kennedy University.

== Bibliography ==
- Don't Sweat the Small Stuff in Love (with Richard Carlson)
- Don't Sweat the Small Stuff for Women
- An Hour to Live, an Hour to Love: The True Story of the Best Gift Ever Given (with Richard Carlson, 2007)
- Heart Broken Open
