= Richard Carlson (author) =

American author, psychotherapist, and motivational speaker (1961–2006)

- Born: May 16, 1961; Piedmont, California, U.S.
- Died: December 13, 2006 (aged 45); San Francisco, California, U.S.
- Occupations: Author, psychotherapist and motivational speaker
- Writing career
- Genre: Self-help
- Website: dontsweat.com

Richard Carlson (May 16, 1961 – December 13, 2006) was an American author, psychotherapist, and motivational speaker. His book, Don't Sweat the Small Stuff... and it's all Small Stuff (1997), was USA Today's bestselling book for two consecutive years. and spent over 101 weeks on the New York Times Best Seller list. It was published in 135 countries and translated into thirty languages. Carlson went on to write 20 books.

== Early life ==
Carlson was born and raised in Piedmont, California in East San Francisco Bay Area. He played tennis and was the top-ranked junior in Northern California in 1979. He received his bachelor's degree from Pepperdine University in Malibu, California, where he met and married Kristine Anderson (Kris Carlson) in 1981.

== Career ==
Carlson started his career as a psychotherapist and ran a stress management centre. He published his first book in 1985, but became famous with his 10th book, Don't Sweat the Small Stuff...and it's all Small Stuff. While Richard Carlson did not coin the term "Don't Sweat the Small Stuff," he was awarded a trademark for bringing it into American pop culture. The book was number one on the New York Times list for over 100 weeks. The Don't Sweat series is based on his earlier work presented in "You Can Be Happy, No Matter What: Five Principles to Keep Life in Perspective." People magazine named Richard Carlson as one of that publication's "Most Intriguing People in the World." He was popular on the talk-show circuit. Meanwhile, he also appeared in a Don't Sweat the Small Stuff... and It's All Small Stuff TV special, and soon took up writing full-time.

His following books include Slowing Down to the Speed of Life (co-authored with Joe Bailey, 1997), one co-authored by his wife, Don't Sweat the Small Stuff in Love (2000), and What About the Big Stuff (2002). Don't Worry, Make Money (1997) received a starred review from Publishers Weekly.

== Personal life ==
Carlson was married to Kristine Carlson; they had two daughters, Jasmine and Kenna. His parents, Barbara and Don Carlson of Orinda, California, founded the ARK Foundation, a charitable organization dedicated to promoting world peace. He also had two sisters, Kathleen Carlson Mowris of Olympic Valley, California and Anna Carlson of La Selva Beach, California.

Carlson died on December 13, 2006, from a pulmonary embolism during a flight from San Francisco to New York City, while on a promotional tour for Don't Get Scrooged (2006). He was 45.

== Works ==
- You Can Feel Good Again: Common-Sense Therapy for Releasing Depression and Changing Your Life. Published by Penguin Group, 1994. ISBN 978-0-452-27242-2.
- Handbook for the Soul (with Benjamin Shield). Published by Little, Brown, 1995.
- Shortcut Through Therapy: Ten Principles of Growth-Oriented, Contented Living. Published by Plume, 1995. ISBN 978-0-452-27383-2.
- Don't Sweat the Small Stuff—and It's All Small Stuff: Simple Ways to Keep the Little Things from Taking Over Your Life. Published by Hyperion, 1997. ISBN 978-0-7868-8185-7.
- You Can Be Happy No Matter What: Five Principles Your Therapist Never Told You, contributor Dr. Wayne Dyer. Published by New World Library, 1997. ISBN 978-1-57731-064-8.
- Don't Worry, Make Money. Published by Hyperion, 1997. ISBN 978-0-7868-6321-1.
- Slowing Down to the Speed of Life: How to Create a More Peaceful, Simpler Life from the Inside Out (with Joseph Bailey). Published by HarperCollins, 1998. ISBN 978-0-06-251454-7.
- Don't Sweat the Small Stuff with Your Family: Simple Ways to Keep Daily Responsibilities and Household Chaos from Taking Over Your Life. Published by Hyperion, 1998. ISBN 978-0-7868-8337-0.
- A Don't Sweat the Small Stuff Treasury: A Special Selection for Teachers. Published by Hyperion, 1999. ISBN 978-0-7868-6576-5.
- Don't Sweat the Small Stuff at Work: Simple Ways to Minimize Stress and Conflict While Bringing Out the Best in Yourself and Others. Published by Hyperion, 1999. ISBN 978-0-7868-8336-3.
- Don't Sweat the Small Stuff for Teens: Simple Ways to Keep Your Cool in Stressful Times. Published by Tandem Library, 2000. ISBN 978-0-613-31135-9.
- Don't Sweat the Small Stuff in Love: Simple Ways to Nurture and Strengthen Your Relationships While Avoiding the Habits That Break Down Your Loving Connection (with Kristine Carlson). Published by Hyperion, 2000. ISBN 978-0-7868-8420-9.
- The Don't Sweat Guide for Parents: Reduce Stress and Enjoy Your Kids More. Published by Hyperion, 2001. ISBN 978-0-7868-8718-7.
- Don't Sweat the Small Stuff for Men: Simple Ways to Minimize Stress in a Competitive World. Published by Hyperion, 2001. ISBN 978-0-7868-8636-4.
- Don't Sweat the Small Stuff for Women: Simple and Practical Ways to Do What Matters Most and Find Time for You (with Kristine Carlson). Published by Hyperion, 2001. ISBN 978-0-7868-8602-9.
- The Don't Sweat Guide for Moms: Being More Relaxed and Peaceful So Your Kids Are, Too (with Kristine Carlson). Published by Hyperion, 2002. ISBN 978-0-7868-8727-9.
- The Don't Sweat Guide for Graduates: Facing New Challenges with Confidence. Published by Hyperion, 2002. ISBN 978-0-7868-8725-5.
- What About the Big Stuff?: Finding Strength and Moving Forward When the Stakes Are High. Published by Hyperion, 2003. ISBN 978-0-7868-8880-1.
- The Don't Sweat Guide for Teachers: Cutting Through the Clutter So That Every Day Counts. Published by Hyperion, 2003. ISBN 978-0-7868-9053-8.
- The Don't Sweat Guide for Dads: Stopping Stress from Getting in the Way of What Really Matters. Published by Hyperion, 2003. ISBN 978-0-7868-8724-8.
- Stop Thinking, Start Living. Published by Harper Element, 2003. ISBN 978-0-7225-3547-9.
- The Don't Sweat Guide to Your Job Search: Finding a Career You Really Love (with the editors of Don't Sweat Press). Published by Hyperion, 2004. ISBN 978-1-4013-0760-8.
- Easier Than You Think: The Small Changes That Add Up to a World of Difference. Published by Harper, 2005. ISBN 978-0-06-075888-2.
- Don't Get Scrooged: How to Thrive in a World Full of Obnoxious, Incompetent, Arrogant, and Downright Mean-Spirited People. Published by HarperCollins, 2006. ISBN 978-0-06-075892-9.
- You Can Be Happy No Matter What: Five Principles for Keeping Life in Perspective, contributor Dr. Wayne Dyer. Published by New World Library, 2006. ISBN 978-1-57731-568-1.
- An Hour to Live, an Hour to Love: The True Story of the Best Gift Ever Given (with Kristine Carlson). Published by Hyperion, 2007. ISBN 978-1-4013-2257-1.
- Focus on the Good Stuff: The Power of Appreciation (with Mike Robbins). Published by Wiley, 2007. ISBN 978-0-7879-8879-1.

=== Forewords ===
- Nerburn, Kent (1994). Letters to My Son: A Father's Wisdom on Manhood, Women, Life and Love. San Rafael, California: New World Library. ISBN 978-1-880032-49-7.
- Kundtz, David (1998). Stopping: How to Be Still When You Have to Keep Going. Conari Press. ISBN 978-1-57324-109-0.
- Breitman, Patti; Hatch, Connie (2000). How to Say No Without Feeling Guilty: And Say Yes to More Time, and What Matters Most to You. New York: Broadway Books. ISBN 978-0-7679-0379-0.
- Fettke, Rich (2002). Extreme Success: The 7-Part Program That Shows You How to Succeed Without Struggle. New York: Simon & Schuster. ISBN 978-0-7432-2314-0.
- Bailey, Joseph V. (2003). Slowing Down to the Speed of Love: How to Create a Deeper, More Fulfilling Relationship in a Hurried World. New York: McGraw-Hill. ISBN 978-0-07-143873-5.
- Welshons, John E. (2007). When Prayers Aren't Answered: Opening the Heart and Quieting the Mind in Challenging Times. Novato, California: New World Library. ISBN 978-1-57731-587-2.
- Bailey, Joseph (2007). Fearproof Your Life: How to Thrive in a World Addicted to Fear. San Francisco: Red Wheel/Weiser. ISBN 978-1-57324-307-0.
