= Journal of Lutheran Ethics =

- Discipline: Lutheran Ethics, Christian Ethics
- Language: English
- Edited by: Jennifer Hockenbery, Ph.D.

Publication details
- History: 2001-present
- Publisher: Office of the Presiding Bishop, Evangelical Lutheran Church in America (ELCA) (United States)
- Frequency: bimonthly
- Open access: yes

Standard abbreviations
- ISO 4: J. Lutheran Ethics

Links
- Journal homepage

The Journal of Lutheran Ethics (JLE) is a bimonthly, open access ecclesial academic journal that covers ethical issues from Christian perspectives with special attention to the confessional tradition of the Evangelical Lutheran Church in America (ELCA). It is published by the Theological Discernment Team in the ELCA's Office of the Presiding Bishop. The current editor-in-chief is Jennifer Hockenbery.

== History ==
The Journal of Lutheran Ethics was established in September 2001 and was published monthly. In 2011 it moved to a bimonthly rhythm. Each issue features book reviews and, since 2019, special features for use in the congregation.

Past editors of the Journal of Lutheran Ethics include Carmelo Santos, James Kenneth Echols, Victor Thasia, and Kaari Reinertson.

Past topics discussed in the Journal of Lutheran Ethics include economic inequality, immigration, abortion, gun control, technology, natural law, genetics and stem cell research, foreign policy, ecumenism, just war, climate change and ecojustice, addiction, end-of-life issues, and Israel-Palestine.
