= List of awards and nominations received by Denzel Washington =

Denzel Washington awards and nominations
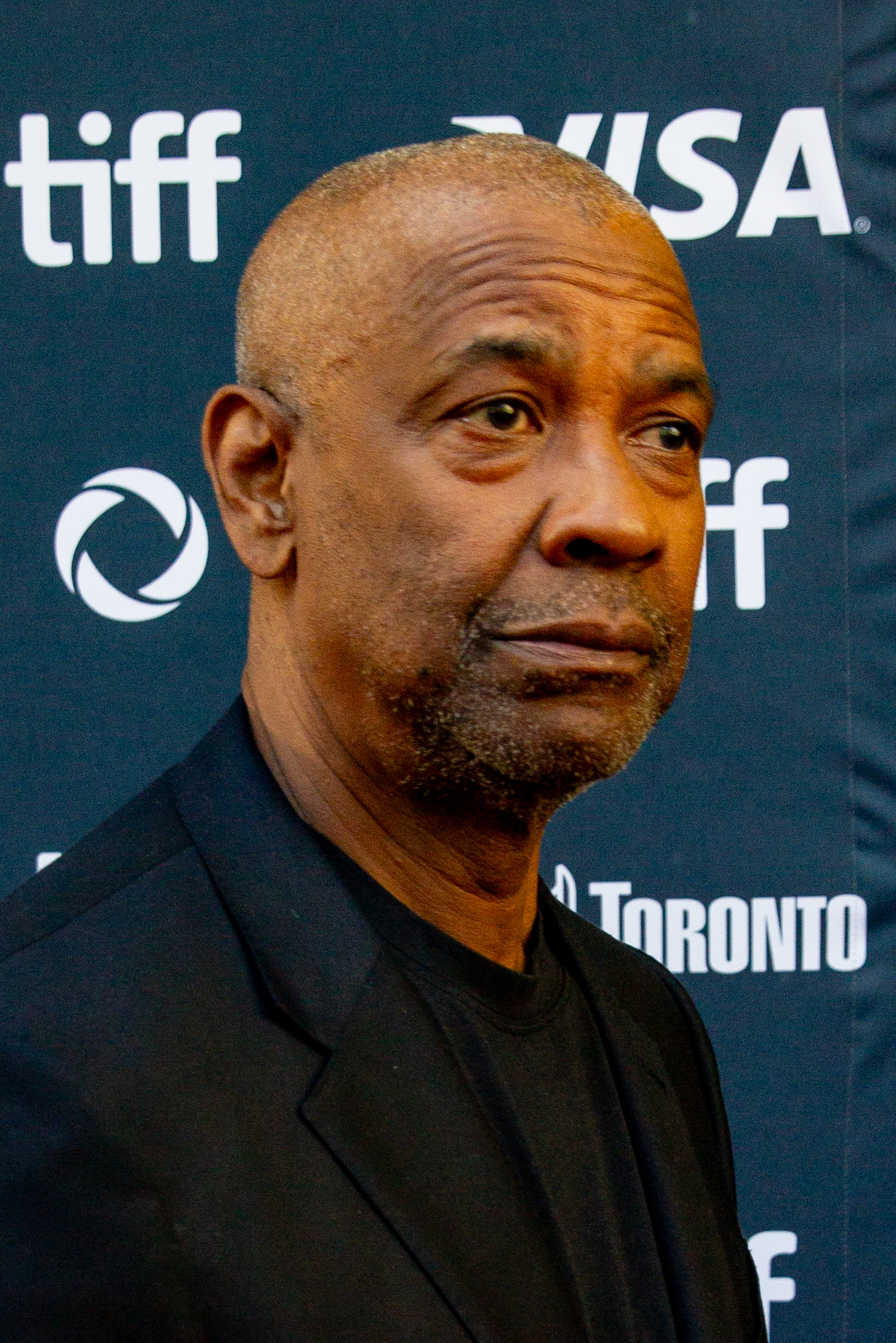
- Washington at TIFF in 2024
Awards and nominations
Award	Wins	Nominations
Academy Awards	2	10
Actor Awards	1	8
Emmy Awards	0	2
Golden Globes	2	11
Grammy Awards	0	1
Tony Awards	1	2

Totals (Note: Certain award groups do not simply award one winner. They acknowledge several different recipients, have runners-up, and have third place. Since this is a specific recognition and is different from losing an award, runner-up mentions are considered wins in this award tally. For simplification and to avoid errors, each award in this list has been presumed to have had a prior nomination.)
- Wins: 65
- Nominations: 33

Denzel Washington is an American actor, producer, and director who has received numerous accolades including two Academy Awards, an Actor Award, two Golden Globe Awards, and a Tony Award as well as nominations for a Grammy Award, and two Primetime Emmy Awards. He has been honored with the BAFTA Los Angeles Britannia Award in 2007, the Golden Globe Cecil B. DeMille Award in 2016, and the AFI Life Achievement Award in 2019. He was supposed to be awarded the Presidential Medal of Freedom by Joe Biden in 2022, but he didn't receive it until 2025.

Washington has received ten Academy Award nominations winning once for Best Supporting Actor for his portrayal of a Union soldier in the Edward Zwick Civil War film Glory (1989), and Best Actor for playing a corrupt cop in Antoine Fuqua's crime thriller Training Day (2001). He was Oscar-nominated for playing Steve Biko in the historical epic Cry Freedom (1987), the title role in the biographical drama Malcolm X (1992), Rubin Carter in the sports drama The Hurricane (1999), an Airline pilot fighting substance abuse in Flight (2012), a working class family man in the period drama Fences (2015), a Los Angeles lawyer in the legal drama Roman J. Israel, Esq. (2017), and Macbeth in the thriller The Tragedy of Macbeth (2021). Washington was also nominated for the Academy Award for Best Picture as a producer for Fences.

Washington is one of nine actors who have been nominated for an acting Academy Award in five different decades (1980s, '90s. 2000s, '10s and '20s), joining Laurence Olivier, Katharine Hepburn, Paul Newman, Jack Nicholson, Michael Caine, Meryl Streep, Frances McDormand and Robert De Niro. He has received nine Golden Globe Award nominations winning twice for his performances in Glory (1989) and The Hurricane (1999). He has also received seven Screen Actors Guild Award nominations winning for Outstanding Actor in a Leading Role for his performance in the film adaptation of Fences (2015). He has been nominated for 11 Golden Globe Awards winning thrice including for the Cecil B. DeMille Award.

For his work on stage he received the Tony Award for Best Actor in a Play for his role as a disillusioned working class father in the Broadway revival of the August Wilson play Fences (2010). He was Tony-nominated for playing the lead in the revival of the Eugene O'Neill play The Iceman Cometh (2018). He was Primetime Emmy Award-nominated for his work with documentary series on the baseball player Hank Aaron and photographer Gordon Parks. He was nominated for the Grammy Award for Best Spoken Word Album for Children for the folk tale, John Henry in 1996.

== Major associations ==
=== Academy Awards ===
Year	Category	Nominated work	Result	Ref.
1988	Best Supporting Actor	Cry Freedom	Nominated	
1990	Best Supporting Actor	Glory	Won	
1993	Best Actor	Malcolm X	Nominated	
2000	Best Actor	The Hurricane	Nominated	
2002	Best Actor	Training Day	Won	
2013	Best Actor	Flight	Nominated	
2017	Best Actor	Fences	Nominated	
2017	Best Picture	Fences	Nominated	
2018	Best Actor	Roman J. Israel, Esq.	Nominated	
2022	Best Actor	The Tragedy of Macbeth	Nominated	

=== Actor Awards ===
Year	Category	Nominated work	Result	Ref.
2000	Outstanding Male Actor in a Leading Role	The Hurricane	Nominated	
2002	Outstanding Male Actor in a Leading Role	Training Day	Nominated	
2008	Outstanding Cast in a Motion Picture (Note: Shared with the cast)	American Gangster	Nominated	
2013	Outstanding Male Actor in a Leading Role	Flight	Nominated	
2017	Outstanding Male Actor in a Leading Role	Fences	Won	
2017	Outstanding Cast in a Motion Picture	Fences	Nominated	
2018	Outstanding Male Actor in a Leading Role	Roman J. Israel, Esq.	Nominated	
2022	Outstanding Male Actor in a Leading Role	The Tragedy of Macbeth	Nominated	

=== Critics' Choice Awards ===
Critics' Choice Movie Awards
Year	Category	Nominated work	Result	Ref.
2003	Freedom Award	Antwone Fisher	Won	
2013	Best Actor	Flight	Nominated	
2016	Best Director	Fences	Nominated	
2016	Best Actor	Fences	Nominated	
2016	Best Acting Ensemble	Fences	Nominated	
2022	Best Actor	The Tragedy of Macbeth	Nominated	
2025	Best Supporting Actor	Gladiator II	Nominated	

=== Primetime Emmy Awards ===
Primetime Emmy Awards
Year	Category	Nominated work	Result	Ref.
1995	Outstanding Informational Series or Special	Hank Aaron: Chasing the Dream	Nominated	
2001	Outstanding Documentary or Nonfiction Special	Half Past Autumn: The Life and Works of Gordon Parks	Nominated	

=== Golden Globe Awards ===
Year	Category	Nominated work	Result	Ref.
1988	Best Actor in a Motion Picture – Drama	Cry Freedom	Nominated	
1990	Best Supporting Actor – Motion Picture	Glory	Won	
1993	Best Actor in a Motion Picture – Drama	Malcolm X	Nominated	
2000	Best Actor in a Motion Picture – Drama	The Hurricane	Won	
2002	Best Actor in a Motion Picture – Drama	Training Day	Nominated	
2008	Best Actor in a Motion Picture – Drama	American Gangster	Nominated	
2013	Best Actor in a Motion Picture – Drama	Flight	Nominated	
2016	Cecil B. DeMille Award		Won	
2017	Best Actor in a Motion Picture – Drama	Fences	Nominated	
2018	Best Actor in a Motion Picture – Drama	Roman J. Israel, Esq.	Nominated	
2022	Best Actor in a Motion Picture – Drama	The Tragedy of Macbeth	Nominated	
2025	Best Supporting Actor – Motion Picture	Gladiator II	Nominated	

=== Grammy Awards ===
Year	Category	Nominated work	Result	Ref.
1996	Best Spoken Word Album for Children	John Henry	Nominated	

=== Tony Awards ===
Year	Category	Nominated work	Result	Ref.
2010	Best Leading Actor in a Play	Fences	Won	
2018	Best Leading Actor in a Play	The Iceman Cometh	Nominated	

== Critics awards ==
Organizations	Year	Category	Work	Result	Ref.
African-American Film Critics Association	2012	Best Actor	Flight	Won	
African-American Film Critics Association	2016	Best Actor	Fences	Won	
Alliance of Women Film Journalists	2016	Best Actor	Fences	Nominated	
Alliance of Women Film Journalists	2021	Best Actor	The Tragedy of Macbeth	Nominated	
Alliance of Women Film Journalists	2025	Best Supporting Actor	Gladiator II	Nominated	
Austin Film Critics Association	2021	Best Actor	The Tragedy of Macbeth	Nominated	
Black Film Critics Circle	2016	Best Actor	Fences	Won	
Boston Society of Film Critics	1992	Best Actor	Malcolm X	Won	
Boston Society of Film Critics	2001	Best Actor	Training Day	Won	
Central Ohio Film Critics Association	2016	Best Actor	Fences	Won	
Chicago Film Critics Association	1989	Best Supporting Actor	Glory	Nominated	
Chicago Film Critics Association	1992	Best Actor	Malcolm X	Won	
Chicago Film Critics Association	1995	Best Actor	Devil in a Blue Dress	Nominated	
Chicago Film Critics Association	1996	Best Actor	Courage Under Fire	Nominated	
Chicago Film Critics Association	1999	Best Actor	The Hurricane	Nominated	
Chicago Film Critics Association	2001	Best Actor	Training Day	Nominated	
Chicago Film Critics Association	2012	Best Actor	Flight	Nominated	
Chicago Film Critics Association	2016	Best Actor	Fences	Nominated	
Dallas-Fort Worth Film Critics Association	1992	Best Actor	Malcolm X	Won	
Dallas-Fort Worth Film Critics Association	2001	Best Actor	Training Day	Nominated	
Dallas-Fort Worth Film Critics Association	2012	Best Actor	Flight	Nominated	
Dallas-Fort Worth Film Critics Association	2016	Best Actor	Fences	Nominated	
Dallas-Fort Worth Film Critics Association	2021	Best Actor	The Tragedy of Macbeth	Nominated	
Houston Film Critics Society	2012	Best Actor	Flight	Nominated	
Houston Film Critics Society	2016	Best Actor	Fences	Nominated	
Houston Film Critics Society	2021	Best Actor	The Tragedy of Macbeth	Nominated	
Kansas City Film Critics Circle	1989	Best Supporting Actor	Glory	Won	
Kansas City Film Critics Circle	1992	Best Actor	Malcolm X	Won	
Kansas City Film Critics Circle	2001	Best Actor	Training Day	Won	
Los Angeles Film Critics Association	2001	Best Actor	Training Day	Won	
National Society of Film Critics	1989	Best Supporting Actor	Glory	Nominated	
National Society of Film Critics	2016	Best Actor	Flight	Nominated	
New York Film Critics Circle	1989	Best Supporting Actor	Glory	Nominated	
New York Film Critics Circle	1992	Best Actor	Malcolm X	Won	
New York Film Critics Circle	2001	Best Actor	Training Day	Nominated	
Online Film Critics Society	2001	Best Actor	Training Day	Nominated	
Online Film Critics Society	2012	Best Actor	Flight	Nominated	
Online Film Critics Society	2016	Best Actor	Fences	Nominated	
Phoenix Film Critics Society	2002	Best Director	Antwone Fisher	Nominated	
San Francisco Film Critics Circle	2016	Best Actor	Fences	Won	
San Francisco Film Critics Circle	2021	Best Actor	The Tragedy of Macbeth	Nominated	
Southeastern Film Critics Association	1992	Best Actor	Malcolm X	Won	
Southeastern Film Critics Association	1996	Best Actor	Courage Under Fire	Won	
St. Louis Gateway Film Critics Association	2012	Best Actor	Flight	Nominated	
St. Louis Gateway Film Critics Association	2021	Best Actor	The Tragedy of Macbeth	Nominated	
Toronto Film Critics Association	2021	Best Actor	The Tragedy of Macbeth	Won	
Vancouver Film Critics Circle	2016	Best Actor	Flight	Nominated	
Vancouver Film Critics Circle	2021	Best Actor	The Tragedy of Macbeth	Nominated	
Washington D.C. Area Film Critics Association	2002	Best Director	Antwone Fisher	Won	
Washington D.C. Area Film Critics Association	2012	Best Actor	Flight	Nominated	
Washington D.C. Area Film Critics Association	2016	Best Actor	Fences	Nominated	
Washington D.C. Area Film Critics Association	2021	Best Actor	The Tragedy of Macbeth	Nominated	

== Miscellaneous awards ==
Organizations	Year	Category	Work	Result	Ref.
AACTA International Awards	2012	Best Actor	Flight	Nominated	
AACTA International Awards	2016	Best Actor	Fences	Nominated	
AACTA International Awards	2022	Best Actor	The Tragedy of Macbeth	Nominated	
AACTA International Awards	2025	Best Supporting Actor	Gladiator II	Nominated	
AARP Annual Movies for Grownups Awards	2012	Best Actor	Flight	Won	
AARP Annual Movies for Grownups Awards	2016	Best Actor	Fences	Won	
AARP Annual Movies for Grownups Awards	2021	Best Actor	The Tragedy of Macbeth	Nominated	
AARP Annual Movies for Grownups Awards	2025	Best Supporting Actor	Gladiator II	Nominated	
American Film Institute	2002	Actor of the Year – Male – Movies	Training Day	Won	
Berlin International Film Festival	1993	Silver Bear for Best Actor	Malcolm X	Won	
Berlin International Film Festival	2000	Silver Bear for Best Actor	The Hurricane	Won	
Black Reel Awards	2000	Outstanding Actor	The Hurricane	Won	
Black Reel Awards	2001	Outstanding Actor	Remember the Titans	Won	
Black Reel Awards	2002	Outstanding Actor	Training Day	Won	
Black Reel Awards	2003	Outstanding Actor	John Q	Nominated	
Black Reel Awards	2003	Outstanding Director	Antwone Fisher	Won	
Black Reel Awards	2003	Outstanding Supporting Actor	Antwone Fisher	Nominated	
Black Reel Awards	2004	Outstanding Actor	Out of Time	Nominated	
Black Reel Awards	2007	Outstanding Actor	Inside Man	Nominated	
Black Reel Awards	2013	Outstanding Actor	Flight	Won	
Black Reel Awards	2015	Outstanding Actor	The Equalizer	Nominated	
Black Reel Awards	2017	Outstanding Director	Fences	Nominated	
Black Reel Awards	2017	Outstanding Actor	Fences	Won	
Black Reel Awards	2017	Outstanding Actor	The Magnificent Seven	Nominated	
Black Reel Awards	2018	Outstanding Actor	Roman J. Israel, Esq.	Nominated	
Black Reel Awards	2022	Outstanding Actor	The Tragedy of Macbeth	Nominated	
Black Reel Awards	2025	Outstanding Supporting Performance	Gladiator II	Nominated	
Black Reel Awards	2026	Outstanding Lead Performance	Highest 2 Lowest	Pending	
Jupiter Award	2005	Best International Actor	The Manchurian Candidate	Nominated	
Jupiter Award	2016	Best International Actor	The Magnificent Seven	Won	
MTV Movie & TV Awards	1993	Best Performance – Male	Malcolm X	Won	
MTV Movie & TV Awards	1994	Most Desirable Male	The Pelican Brief	Nominated	
MTV Movie & TV Awards	1994	Best On-Screen Duo (Note: Shared with Tom Hanks)	Philadelphia	Nominated	
MTV Movie & TV Awards	1996	Best Performance – Male	Crimson Tide	Nominated	
MTV Movie & TV Awards	2002	Best Villain	Training Day	Won	
MTV Movie & TV Awards	2008	Best Performance – Male	American Gangster	Nominated	
MTV Movie & TV Awards	2008	Best Villain	American Gangster	Nominated	
MTV Movie & TV Awards	2013	Best WTF Moment	Flight	Nominated	
NAACP Image Awards	1987	Outstanding Supporting Actor in a Motion Picture	Power	Won	
NAACP Image Awards	1988	Outstanding Actor in a Motion Picture	Cry Freedom	Won	
NAACP Image Awards	1990	Outstanding Supporting Actor in a Motion Picture	Glory	Won	
NAACP Image Awards	1993	Outstanding Actor in a Motion Picture	Mississippi Masala	Won	
NAACP Image Awards	1993	Outstanding Actor in a Motion Picture	Malcolm X	Won	
NAACP Image Awards	1996	Outstanding Actor in a Motion Picture	Crimson Tide	Won	
NAACP Image Awards	1997	Outstanding Actor in a Motion Picture	Courage Under Fire	Won	
NAACP Image Awards	1997	Entertainer of the Year	—N/a	Won	
NAACP Image Awards	1999	Outstanding Actor in a Motion Picture	He Got Game	Nominated	
NAACP Image Awards	2000	Outstanding Actor in a Motion Picture	The Hurricane	Won	
NAACP Image Awards	2001	Outstanding Actor in a Motion Picture	Remember the Titans	Won	
NAACP Image Awards	2002	Outstanding Actor in a Motion Picture	Training Day	Won	
NAACP Image Awards	2003	Outstanding Actor in a Motion Picture	John Q.	Won	
NAACP Image Awards	2003	Outstanding Supporting Actor in a Motion Picture	Antwone Fisher	Won	
NAACP Image Awards	2004	Outstanding Actor in a Motion Picture	Out of Time	Nominated	
NAACP Image Awards	2005	Outstanding Actor in a Motion Picture	Man on Fire	Nominated	
NAACP Image Awards	2007	Outstanding Actor in a Motion Picture	Inside Man	Nominated	
NAACP Image Awards	2008	Outstanding Actor in a Motion Picture	The Great Debaters	Won	
NAACP Image Awards	2008	Outstanding Directing in a Motion Picture	The Great Debaters	Nominated	
NAACP Image Awards	2011	Outstanding Actor in a Motion Picture	The Book of Eli	Won	
NAACP Image Awards	2013	Outstanding Actor in a Motion Picture	Flight	Won	
NAACP Image Awards	2015	Outstanding Actor in a Motion Picture	The Equalizer	Nominated	
NAACP Image Awards	2017	Outstanding Actor in a Motion Picture	Fences	Won	
NAACP Image Awards	2018	Outstanding Actor in a Motion Picture	Roman J. Israel, Esq.	Nominated	
NAACP Image Awards	2022	Outstanding Actor in a Motion Picture	The Tragedy of Macbeth	Nominated	
NAACP Image Awards	2022	Outstanding Directing in a Motion Picture	A Journal for Jordan	Nominated	
NAACP Image Awards	2024	Outstanding Actor in a Motion Picture	The Equalizer 3	Nominated	
NAACP Image Awards	2025	Outstanding Supporting Actor in a Motion Picture	Gladiator II	Won	
Satellite Awards	2000	Best Actor – Motion Picture Drama	The Hurricane	Nominated	
Satellite Awards	2001	Best Actor – Motion Picture Drama	Remember the Titans	Nominated	
Satellite Awards	2002	Best Actor – Motion Picture Drama	Training Day	Nominated	
Satellite Awards	2003	Best Director	Antwone Fisher	Nominated	
Satellite Awards	2007	Best Actor – Motion Picture Drama	American Gangster	Nominated	
Satellite Awards	2012	Best Actor – Motion Picture	Flight	Nominated	
Satellite Awards	2017	Best Actor – Motion Picture	Fences	Nominated	
Satellite Awards	2017	Best Director	Fences	Nominated	
Satellite Awards	2022	Best Actor – Motion Picture Drama	The Tragedy of Macbeth	Nominated	
Satellite Awards	2025	Best Actor in a Supporting Role	Gladiator II	Nominated	
Saturn Award	2010	Best Actor	The Book of Eli	Nominated	

== Honorary awards ==
Organizations	Year	Award	Result	Ref.
American Academy of Achievement	2005	Golden Plate Award	Honored	
BAFTA Los Angeles Britannia Awards	2007	Statue 23	Honored	
San Sebastián International Film Festival	2014	Donostia Award	Honored	
Golden Globe Awards	2016	Cecil B. DeMille Award	Honored	
Santa Barbara International Film Festival	2017	Maltin Modern Master Award	Honored	
American Film Institute	2019	AFI Life Achievement Award	Honored	
Presidential Medal of Freedom	2022	unable to attend		
Presidential Medal of Freedom	2025	Medal	Honored	
Cannes Film Festival	2025	Honorary Palme d'Or	Honored	

== Directed Academy Award performances ==
Under Washington's direction, these actors have received Academy Award nominations (and one win) for their performances in their respective roles.

Year	Performer	Film	Result
Academy Award for Best Actor
2017	Himself	Fences	Nominated
Academy Award for Best Supporting Actress
2017	Viola Davis	Fences	Won

== See also ==
- Denzel Washington on screen and stage
- African-American Tony nominees and winners
- List of African-American actors
- List of black Academy Award winners and nominees
- List of actors with Academy Award nominations
- List of actors with more than one Academy Award nomination in the acting categories
- List of actors with two or more Academy Awards in acting categories
- List of black Golden Globe Award winners and nominees
- List of Golden Globe winners
