= Denzel Washington on screen and stage =

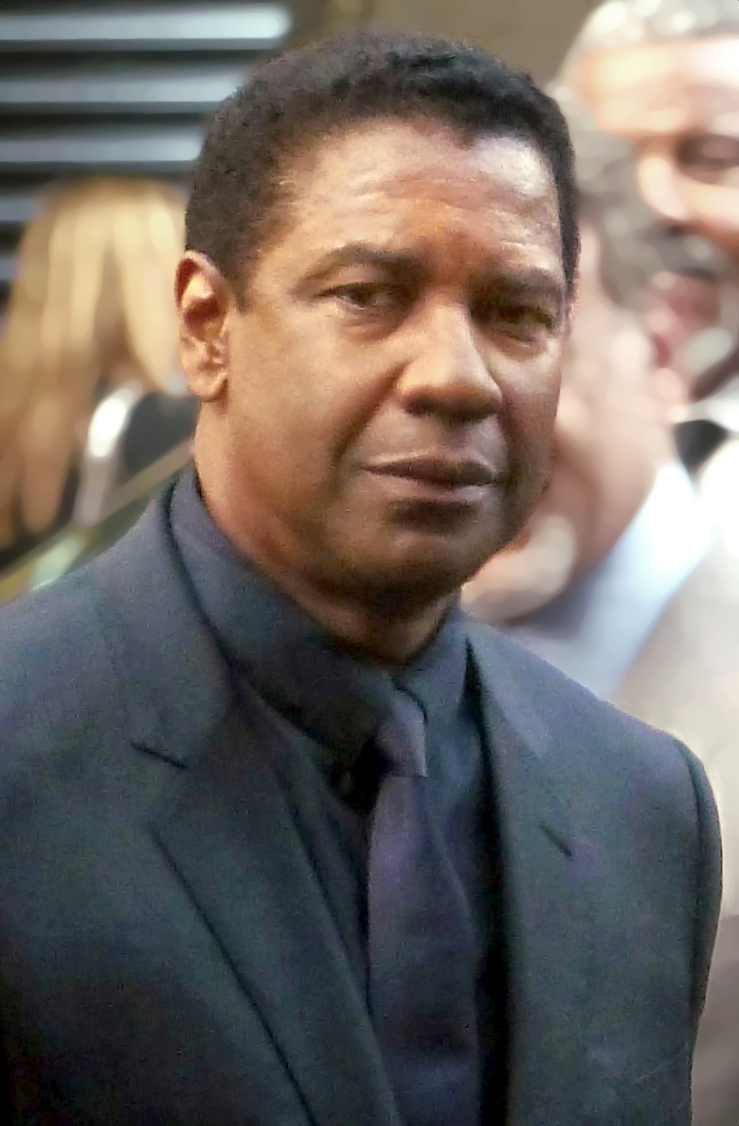
Denzel Washington at the 2016 TIFF

Denzel Washington is an American actor known for his performances on stage and screen as well as for his work as director and producer on the latter. Washington made his feature film debut in Carbon Copy (1981). In 1982, Washington made his first appearance in the medical drama St. Elsewhere as Dr. Philip Chandler. The role proved to be the breakthrough in his career. He starred as Private First Class Melvin Peterson in the drama A Soldier's Story (1984). The film was an adaptation of the Off-Broadway play A Soldier's Play (1981–1983) in which Washington had earlier portrayed the same character.

He has since gained recognition as one of the greatest actors in the 21st century. Washington went on to win two Academy Awards, his first for Best Supporting Actor as a former slave-turned-soldier in Civil War film Glory (1989) and his second for Academy Award for Best Actor for his role as a corrupt cop in the crime thriller Training Day (2001). By virtue of his win, he became the first African American actor to win two competitive Academy Awards, and the first since Sidney Poitier in 1964 to win the leading actor award. His other Oscar-nominated roles were in Cry Freedom (1987), Malcolm X (1992), The Hurricane (1999), Flight (2012), Fences (2016), Roman J. Israel, Esq. (2017), and The Tragedy of Macbeth (2021).

Washington also established himself as a leading man in Hollywood acting in films such as The Mighty Quinn (1989), Spike Lee's Mo' Better Blues (1990), the romantic drama Mississippi Masala (1991), Kenneth Branagh's Much Ado About Nothing (1993), the thriller The Pelican Brief (1993), the AIDS drama Philadelphia (1993), the action thriller Crimson Tide (1995), the war drama Courage Under Fire (1996), the sports drama Remember the Titans (2000), the action thriller Man on Fire (2004), the political thriller The Manchurian Candidate (2004), the crime thrillers Inside Man (2006), and American Gangster (2007). He has starred in the action thriller The Equalizer franchise (2014–2023) and has directed films such as Antwone Fisher (2002), The Great Debaters (2007), and Fences (2016).

He has also asserted himself onstage acting in The Public Theater productions of William Shakespeare's tragedies Coriolanus (1979), and The Tragedy of Richard III (1990). He made his Broadway debut in Checkmates (1988). He went on to win the Tony Award for Best Actor in a Play for playing Troy Maxson in the August Wilson play Fences (2010). His other Broadway roles include Shakespeare's Julius Caesar (2005), Lorraine Hansberry's A Raisin in the Sun (2014), and Eugene O'Neill's The Iceman Cometh (2018), the later of which earned him another Tony Award nomination. Washington returned to Broadway with the title role in the 2025 revival of Shakepeare's Othello.

== Film ==
Year	Title	Role	Notes	Ref(s)
1981	Carbon Copy	Roger Porter		
1984	A Soldier's Story	Private First Class Melvin Peterson		
1986	Power	Arnold Billings		
1987	Cry Freedom	Steve Biko		
1988	For Queen and Country	Reuben James		
1989	The Mighty Quinn	Xavier Quinn		
1989	Glory	Private Silas Trip		
1990	Heart Condition	Napoleon Stone		
1990	Mo' Better Blues	Bleek Gilliam		
1991	Mississippi Masala	Demetrius Williams		
1991	Ricochet	Nick Styles		
1992	Malcolm X	Malcolm X		
1993	Much Ado About Nothing	Don Pedro of Aragon		
1993	The Pelican Brief	Gray Grantham		
1993	Philadelphia	Joe Miller		
1995	Crimson Tide	Lt. Commander Ron Hunter		
1995	Virtuosity	Lt. Parker Barnes		
1995	Devil in a Blue Dress	Easy Rawlins		
1996	Courage Under Fire	Lt. Colonel Nathaniel Sterling		
1996	The Preacher's Wife	Dudley		
1998	Fallen	Detective John Hobbes		
1998	He Got Game	Jake Shuttlesworth		
1998	The Siege	Anthony Hubbard		
1999	The Bone Collector	Lincoln Rhyme		
1999	The Hurricane	Rubin Carter		
2000	Remember the Titans	Herman Boone		
2001	Training Day	Detective Alonzo Harris		
2002	John Q.	John Quincy Archibald		
2002	Antwone Fisher	Dr. Jerome Davenport	Also director and producer	
2003	Out of Time	Matt Lee Whitlock		
2004	Man on Fire	John W. Creasy		
2004	The Manchurian Candidate	Maj. Ben Marco		
2006	Inside Man	Keith Frazier		
2006	Déjà Vu	Doug Carlin		
2007	American Gangster	Frank Lucas		
2007	The Great Debaters	Melvin B. Tolson	Also director	
2009	The Taking of Pelham 123	Walter Garber		
2010	The Book of Eli	Eli	Also producer	
2010	Unstoppable	Frank Barnes		
2012	Safe House	Tobin Frost		
2012	Flight	William "Whip" Whitaker Sr.		
2013	2 Guns	Robert "Bobby" Trench		
2014	The Equalizer	Robert McCall	Also producer	
2016	The Magnificent Seven	Sam Chisolm		
2016	Fences	Troy Maxson	Also director and producer	
2017	Roman J. Israel, Esq.	Roman J. Israel	Also producer	
2018	The Equalizer 2	Robert McCall	Also producer	
2020	Ma Rainey's Black Bottom	—N/a	Producer only	
2021	The Little Things	Deputy Sheriff Joe "Deke" Deacon		
2021	The Tragedy of Macbeth	Lord Macbeth		
2021	A Journal for Jordan	—N/a	Director and producer only	
2023	The Equalizer 3	Robert McCall	Also producer	
2024	The Piano Lesson	—N/a	Producer only	
2024	Gladiator II	Macrinus		
2025	Highest 2 Lowest	David King		
2027	The Take †	Carter	Post-production	

Key
†	Denotes films that have not yet been released

== Television ==
Year(s)	Title	Role(s)	Notes	Ref(s)
1977	Wilma: The Wilma Rudolph Story	Robert Eldridge – age 18	Television film	
1979	Flesh & Blood	Kirk	Television film	
1982–1988	St. Elsewhere	Dr. Philip Chandler	118 episodes	
1984	License to Kill	Martin Sawyer	Television film	
1986	The George McKenna Story	George McKenna	Also known as Hard Lessons; Television film	
1992	Great Performances	Narrator	Episode: "Jammin': Jelly Roll Morton on Broadway"	
1992	Liberators: Fighting on Two Fronts in World War II	Narrator	Documentary	
1995, 1997	Happily Ever After: Fairy Tales for Every Child	King Omar / Humpty Dumpty / Crooked Man	Voice, 2 episodes	
2013	The March	Narrator	Documentary	
2016	Grey's Anatomy	—N/a	Director of episode: "The Sound of Silence"	

== Theatre ==
Year(s)	Production	Role(s)	Theater	Notes	Ref.
1979	Coriolanus	Performer (Note: Washington portrayed various roles including Aediles, a Roman Citizen, a Voscian Citizen, a Roman Soldier and Voscian Soldier)	Joseph Papp Public Theater, Off-Broadway	June 22 − July 22	
1981	When the Chickens Came Home to Roost	Malcolm X	New Federal Theatre, Off-Broadway		
1981–1983	A Soldier's Play	Private First Class Melvin Peterson	Theatre Four, Off-Broadway	Nov. 20, 1981 − Jan. 2, 1983	
1988	Checkmates	Sylvester Williams	46th Street Theatre, Broadway	August 4 − December 31	
1990	The Tragedy of Richard III	Richard III of England	Joseph Papp Public Theater, Off-Broadway	August 3 − September 2	
2005	Julius Caesar	Marcus Brutus	Belasco Theatre, Broadway	April 3 − June 12	
2010	Fences	Troy Maxson	Cort Theatre, Broadway	April 26 − July 11	
2014	A Raisin in the Sun	Walter Lee Younger	Ethel Barrymore Theatre, Broadway	April 3 − June 15	
2018	The Iceman Cometh	Theodore "Hickey" Hickman	Bernard B. Jacobs Theatre, Broadway	April 26 − July 1	
2025	Othello	Othello	Ethel Barrymore Theatre, Broadway	February 24 − June 6	

== See also ==
- List of awards and nominations received by Denzel Washington
- African-American Tony nominees and winners
- List of African-American actors
- List of black Academy Award winners and nominees
- List of actors with Academy Award nominations
- List of actors with more than one Academy Award nomination in the acting categories
- List of actors with two or more Academy Awards in acting categories
- List of black Golden Globe Award winners and nominees
- List of Golden Globe winners
