= Oakland Military Academy =

Coordinates: 41.0293°N 74.2367°W

- United States

Information
- Type: Private, boarding & college preparatory
- Founded: 1935
- Founder: John S. Sarcka
- Status: Closed
- Closed: 1980
- Gender: Male

Oakland Military Academy was founded in Oakland, New Jersey in the 1930s by the Sarcka family. During the 1950s, the military curriculum was discontinued, and the academy was moved to New Windsor, New York. The academic program was discontinued in the early 1970s, although the Oakland School of Horsemanship continued until about 1980, closing after the passing of John Sarcka.

== Notable alumni ==
Alumni include many civic and business leaders.

- Fred Kummer, founder of the Adam's Mark hotel chain
- Denzel Washington
- Charles H. Mallery, Associate Dean, College of Arts & Sciences, University of Miami, Coral Gables, FL
