= NAACP Image Award for Outstanding Actor in a Motion Picture =

American acting award

NAACP Image Award for Best Actor in a Motion Picture
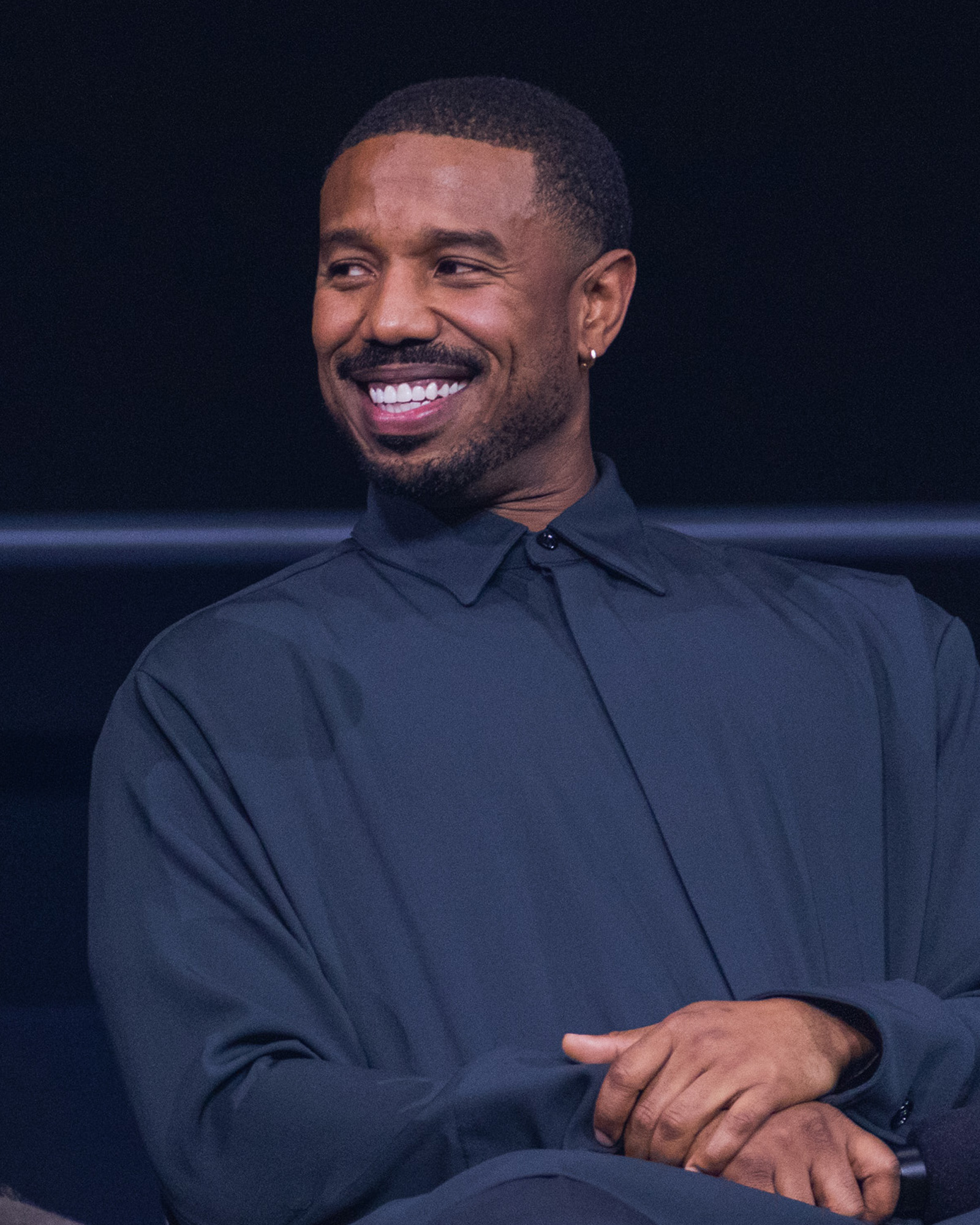
- The 2026 recipient: Michael B. Jordan
- Awarded for: Outstanding Performance by a Male Actor in a Leading Role in a Motion Picture
- Presented by: NAACP
- First award: Raymond St. Jacques for Change of Mind (1969)
- Currently held by: Michael B. Jordan for Sinners (2026)

Highlights
- Most awards: Denzel Washington (13)
- Most nominations: Denzel Washington (24)

This article lists the winners and nominees for the NAACP Image Award for Outstanding Actor in a Motion Picture.

== Winners and nominees ==
For each year in the tables below, the winner is listed first and highlighted in bold.

=== 1960s ===
Year	Actor	Film	Ref
**1969**	**Raymond St. Jacques**	**Change of Mind**	

=== 1970s ===
Year	Actor	Film	Ref
1970	**Jim Brown**	**El Condor**	
1971	**Donald Sutherland**	**Klute**	
1971	Bill Cosby	Man and Boy	
1971	Louis Gossett Jr.	Skin Game	
1971	Moses Gunn	Shaft	
1971	Tom Laughlin	Billy Jack	
1971	Sidney Poitier	The Organization	
1971	Richard Roundtree	Shaft	
1971	Woody Strode	Black Jesus	
1972	**Billy Dee Williams**	**Lady Sings the Blues**	
1973	No award was given	—N/a	
1974	**Bernie Casey**	**Maurie**	
1974	Carl Anderson	Jesus Christ Superstar	
1974	Lawrence Cook	The Spook Who Sat by the Door	
1974	Sidney Poitier	A Warm December	
1974	Bo Svenson	Maurie	
1975	**James Earl Jones**	**Claudine**	
1975	Bill Cosby	Uptown Saturday Night	
1975	Leonard Jackson	Five on the Black Hand Side	
1975	Roger Robinson	Newman's Law	
1975	Jon Voight	Conrack	
1976	**Bill Cosby**	**Let's Do It Again**	
1977	**Billy Dee Williams**	**The Bingo Long Traveling All-Stars & Motor Kings**	
1978	**Paul Winfield**	**A Hero Ain't Nothin' but a Sandwich**	
1979	**Michael Jackson**	**The Wiz**	

=== 1980s ===
Year	Actor	Film	Ref
1980	**LeVar Burton**	**The Hunter**	
1981	**Richard Pryor**	**Bustin' Loose**	
1982	**Louis Gossett Jr.**	**An Officer and a Gentleman**	
1983	**Eddie Murphy**	**Trading Places**	
1984	**Prince**	**Purple Rain**	
1985	**Adolph Caesar**	**A Soldier's Story**	
1986	**Gregory Hines**	**Running Scared**	
1987	**Danny Glover**	**Lethal Weapon**	
1987	Robert Guillaume	Wanted: Dead or Alive	
1987	Dexter Gordon	'Round Midnight	
1987	Robert Townsend	Hollywood Shuffle	
1987	Eddie Murphy	Beverly Hills Cop II	
1988	**Denzel Washington**	**Cry Freedom**	
1988	Gregory Hines	Off Limits	
1988	Eddie Murphy	Coming to America	
1988	Sidney Poitier	Shoot to Kill	
1988	Carl Weathers	Action Jackson	
1989	**Morgan Freeman**	**Lean on Me**	
1989	Spike Lee	Do the Right Thing	
1989	Denzel Washington	The Mighty Quinn	
1989	Gregory Hines	Tap	
1989	Danny Glover	Lethal Weapon 2	

=== 1990s ===
Year	Actor	Film	Ref
1990	**Morgan Freeman**	**Driving Miss Daisy**	
1991	N/A	N/A	
1992	**Wesley Snipes**	**New Jack City**	
1992	Cuba Gooding, Jr.	Boyz n the Hood	
1992	Ice Cube	Boyz n the Hood	
1992	Laurence Fishburne	Boyz n the Hood	
1992	Danny Glover	To Sleep with Anger	
1993	**Denzel Washington**	**Mississippi Masala**	
1993	Eddie Murphy	Boomerang	
1993	Laurence Fishburne	Deep Cover	
1993	Wesley Snipes	White Men Can't Jump	
1993	Danny Glover	Grand Canyon	
1994	**Denzel Washington**	**Malcolm X**	
1994	Laurence Fishburne	What's Love Got to Do with It	
1994	Danny Glover	Bopha!	
1994	Sidney Poitier	Sneakers	
1994	Tupac Shakur	Poetic Justice	
1995	No award was given	—N/a	
1996	**Denzel Washington**	**Crimson Tide**	
1996	Laurence Fishburne	Othello	
1996	Morgan Freeman	Se7en	
1996	Gregory Hines	Waiting to Exhale	
1996	James Earl Jones	Cry, the Beloved Country	
1997	**Denzel Washington**	**Courage Under Fire**	
1997	Ossie Davis	Get on the Bus	
1997	Cuba Gooding, Jr.	Jerry Maguire	
1997	Samuel L. Jackson	The Long Kiss Goodnight	
1997	Eddie Murphy	The Nutty Professor	
1998	**Djimon Hounsou**	**Amistad**	
1998	Laurence Fishburne	Hoodlum	
1998	Samuel L. Jackson	Eve's Bayou	
1998	Ving Rhames	Rosewood	
1998	Larenz Tate	Love Jones	
1999	**Danny Glover**	**Beloved**	
1999	Samuel L. Jackson	The Negotiator	
1999	Will Smith	Enemy of the State	
1999	Chris Tucker	Rush Hour	
1999	Denzel Washington	He Got Game	

=== 2000s ===
Year	Actor	Film	Ref
2000	**Denzel Washington**	**The Hurricane**	
2000	Morris Chestnut	The Best Man	
2000	Taye Diggs	The Best Man	
2000	Michael Clarke Duncan	The Green Mile	
2000	Laurence Fishburne	The Matrix	
2001	**Denzel Washington**	**Remember the Titans**	
2001	Omar Epps	Love & Basketball	
2001	Cuba Gooding Jr.	Men of Honor	
2001	Samuel L. Jackson	Shaft	
2001	Will Smith	The Legend of Bagger Vance	
2002	**Denzel Washington**	**Training Day**	
2002	Morgan Freeman	Along Came a Spider	
2002	Will Smith	Ali	
2002	Chris Tucker	Rush Hour 2	
2002	Tyrese	Baby Boy	
2003	**Denzel Washington**	**John Q**	
2003	Taye Diggs	Brown Sugar	
2003	Morgan Freeman	High Crimes	
2003	Ice Cube	Barbershop	
2003	Samuel L. Jackson	Changing Lanes	
2004	**Cuba Gooding Jr.**	**Radio**	
2004	Laurence Fishburne	The Matrix Revolutions	
2004	Samuel L. Jackson	S.W.A.T.	
2004	Will Smith	Bad Boys II	
2004	Denzel Washington	Out of Time	
2005	**Jamie Foxx**	**Ray**	
2005	Don Cheadle	Hotel Rwanda	
2005	Will Smith	I, Robot	
2005	Mario Van Peebles	Baadasssss!	
2005	Denzel Washington	Man on Fire	
2006	**Samuel L. Jackson**	**Coach Carter**	
2006	Laurence Fishburne	Assault on Precinct 13	
2006	Terrence Howard	Hustle & Flow	
2006	Shemar Moore	Diary of a Mad Black Woman	
2006	Will Smith	Hitch	
2007	**Forest Whitaker**	**The Last King of Scotland**	
2007	Laurence Fishburne	Akeelah and the Bee	
2007	Jamie Foxx	Dreamgirls	
2007	Will Smith	The Pursuit of Happyness	
2007	Denzel Washington	Inside Man	
2008	**Denzel Washington**	**The Great Debaters**	
2008	Don Cheadle	Talk to Me	
2008	Terrence Howard	Pride	
2008	Columbus Short	Stomp the Yard	
2008	Will Smith	I Am Legend	
2009	**Will Smith**	**Seven Pounds**	
2009	Rob Brown	The Express: The Ernie Davis Story	
2009	Don Cheadle	Traitor	
2009	Derek Luke	Miracle at St. Anna	
2009	Jeffrey Wright	Cadillac Records	

=== 2010s ===
Year	Actor	Film	Ref
2010	**Morgan Freeman**	**Invictus**	
2010	Quinton Aaron	The Blind Side	
2010	Idris Elba	Obsessed	
2010	Jamie Foxx	Law Abiding Citizen	
2010	Denzel Washington	The Taking of Pelham 123	
2011	**Denzel Washington**	**The Book of Eli**	
2011	Common	Just Wright	
2011	Morgan Freeman	RED	
2011	Anthony Mackie	Night Catches Us	
2011	Jaden Smith	The Karate Kid	
2012	**Laz Alonso**	**Jumping the Broom**	
2012	Vin Diesel	Fast Five	
2012	Laurence Fishburne	Contagion	
2012	Oliver Litondo	The First Grader	
2012	Eddie Murphy	Tower Heist	
2013	**Denzel Washington**	**Flight**	
2013	Jamie Foxx	Django Unchained	
2013	Morgan Freeman	The Magic of Belle Isle	
2013	Tyler Perry	Alex Cross	
2013	Suraj Sharma	Life of Pi	
2014	**Forest Whitaker**	**Lee Daniels' The Butler**	
2014	Chadwick Boseman	42	
2014	Chiwetel Ejiofor	12 Years a Slave	
2014	Idris Elba	Mandela: Long Walk to Freedom	
2014	Michael B. Jordan	Fruitvale Station	
2015	**David Oyelowo**	**Selma**	
2015	Chadwick Boseman	Get On Up	
2015	Idris Elba	No Good Deed	
2015	Nate Parker	Beyond the Lights	
2015	Denzel Washington	The Equalizer	
2016	**Michael B. Jordan**	**Creed**	
2016	Abraham Attah	Beasts of No Nation	
2016	Michael Ealy	The Perfect Guy	
2016	Chiwetel Ejiofor	Secret in Their Eyes	
2016	Will Smith	Concussion	
2017	**Denzel Washington**	**Fences**	
2017	Don Cheadle	Miles Ahead	
2017	Stephan James	Race	
2017	Nate Parker	The Birth of a Nation	
2017	Will Smith	Collateral Beauty	
2018	**Daniel Kaluuya**	**Get Out**	
2018	Chadwick Boseman	Marshall	
2018	Idris Elba	The Mountain Between Us	
2018	Algee Smith	Detroit	
2018	Denzel Washington	Roman J. Israel, Esq.	
2019	**Chadwick Boseman**	**Black Panther**	
2019	Stephan James	If Beale Street Could Talk	
2019	Michael B. Jordan	Creed II	
2019	Denzel Washington	The Equalizer 2	
2019	John David Washington	BlacKkKlansman	

=== 2020s ===
Year	Actor	Film	Ref
2020	**Michael B. Jordan**	**Just Mercy**	
2020	Chadwick Boseman	21 Bridges	
2020	Winston Duke	Us	
2020	Daniel Kaluuya	Queen & Slim	
2020	Eddie Murphy	Dolemite Is My Name	
2021	**Chadwick Boseman**	**Ma Rainey's Black Bottom**	
2021	Anthony Mackie	The Banker	
2021	Delroy Lindo	Da 5 Bloods	
2021	Forest Whitaker	Jingle Jangle: A Christmas Journey	
2021	Will Smith	Bad Boys for Life	
2022	**Will Smith**	**King Richard**	
2022	Denzel Washington	The Tragedy of Macbeth	
2022	Jonathan Majors	The Harder They Fall	
2022	Lakeith Stanfield	Judas and the Black Messiah	
2022	Mahershala Ali	Swan Song	
2023	**Will Smith**	**Emancipation**	
2023	Joshua Boone	A Jazzman's Blues	
2023	Sterling K. Brown	Honk for Jesus. Save Your Soul.	
2023	Daniel Kaluuya	Nope	
2023	Jonathan Majors	Devotion	
2024	**Colman Domingo**	**Rustin**	
2024	John Boyega	They Cloned Tyrone	
2024	Jamie Foxx	The Burial	
2024	Denzel Washington	The Equalizer 3	
2024	Jeffrey Wright	American Fiction	
2025	**Martin Lawrence**	**Bad Boys: Ride or Die**	
2025	André Holland	Exhibiting Forgiveness	
2025	Colman Domingo	Sing Sing	
2025	John David Washington	The Piano Lesson	
2025	Kingsley Ben-Adir	Bob Marley: One Love	
2026	**Michael B. Jordan**	**Sinners**	
2026	André Holland	Love, Brooklyn	
2026	Denzel Washington	Highest 2 Lowest	
2026	Nnamdi Asomugha	The Knife	
2026	Tyriq Withers	Him	

== Multiple wins and nominations ==
=== Wins ===
13 wins

- Denzel Washington

3 wins

- Morgan Freeman
- Michael B. Jordan
- Will Smith

2 wins

- Chadwick Boseman
- Danny Glover
- Forest Whitaker
- Billy Dee Williams

=== Nominations ===
24 nominations

- Denzel Washington

14 nominations

- Will Smith

10 nominations

- Laurence Fishburne

9 nominations

- Morgan Freeman

7 nominations

- Danny Glover
- Samuel L. Jackson
- Eddie Murphy

6 nominations

- Chadwick Boseman

5 nominations

- Michael B. Jordan

4 nominations

- Don Cheadle
- Idris Elba
- Jamie Foxx
- Cuba Gooding, Jr.
- Gregory Hines
- Sidney Poitier

3 nominations

- Bill Cosby
- Daniel Kaluuya
- Forest Whitaker
- Billy Dee Williams

2 nominations

- Ice Cube
- Taye Diggs
- Chiwetel Ejiofor
- Louis Gossett Jr.
- André Holland
- Terrence Howard
- Stephan James
- James Earl Jones
- Anthony Mackie
- Jonathan Majors
- Nate Parker
- Wesley Snipes
- Chris Tucker
- Colman Domingo
- John David Washington
