= Denzel Washington =

American actor (born 1954)

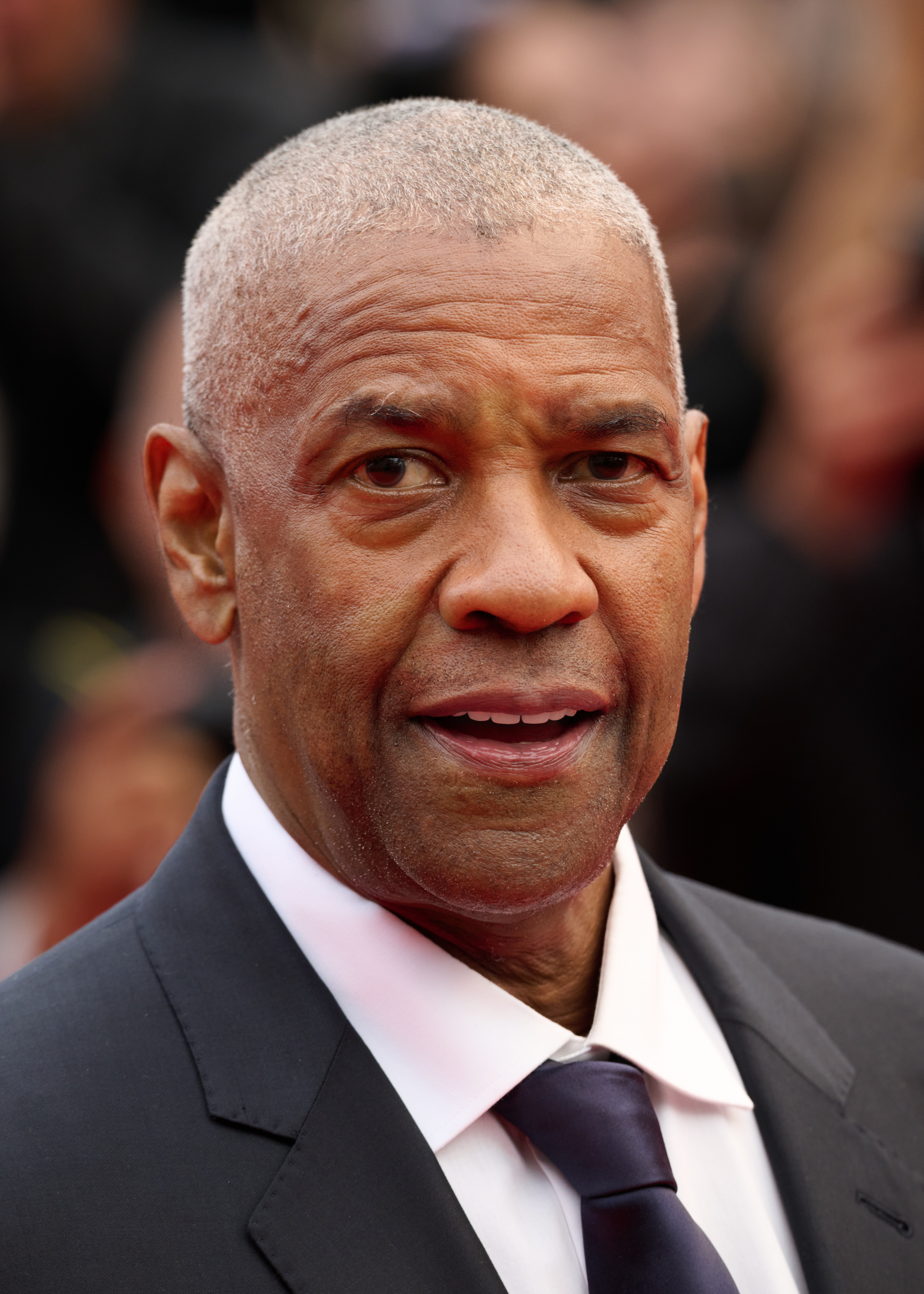
- Washington in 2025
- Born: Denzel Hayes Washington Jr. December 28, 1954 (age 71); Mount Vernon, New York, U.S.
- Education: Fordham University (BA); American Conservatory Theater
- Occupations: Actor; producer
- Years active: 1975–present
- Works: Full list
- Spouse: Pauletta Pearson (m. 1983)
- Children: John David; Katia; Malcolm; Olivia
- Awards: Full list
- Honors: Full list

Denzel Hayes Washington Jr. (born December 28, 1954) is an American actor and film producer. Known for his dramatic roles on stage and screen, he has received numerous accolades including two Academy Awards, an Actor Award, two Golden Globes, two Silver Bears and a Tony Award, as well as nominations for a Grammy Award and two Primetime Emmy Awards. In 2020, The New York Times named Washington the greatest actor of the 21st century. He has also been honored with the Cecil B. DeMille Award (2016), AFI Life Achievement Award (2019) the Honorary Palme d'Or (2025), and the Presidential Medal of Freedom (2025). (Note: Washington was supposed to receive the award in 2022 but had to skip the ceremony after testing positive for COVID-19.) Films in which he has appeared have grossed over $5.1 billion worldwide.

After training at the American Conservatory Theater, Washington began his career in theater, acting in performances off-Broadway. He first came to prominence in the NBC medical drama series St. Elsewhere (1982–1988), and in the war film A Soldier's Story (1984). Washington won Academy Awards for Best Supporting Actor for playing an American Civil War soldier in the war drama Glory (1989), and for Best Actor for playing a corrupt police officer in the crime thriller Training Day (2001). He was nominated for further Academy Awards for his roles in Cry Freedom (1987), Malcolm X (1992), The Hurricane (1999), Flight (2012), Fences (2016), Roman J. Israel, Esq. (2017), and The Tragedy of Macbeth (2021).

Washington has also starred in the films The Pelican Brief, Philadelphia (both 1993); Crimson Tide, Devil in a Blue Dress (both 1995); He Got Game (1998); Remember the Titans (2000); Man on Fire (2004); Déjà Vu, Inside Man (both 2006); American Gangster (2007); Unstoppable, The Book of Eli (both 2010); The Equalizer trilogy (2014–2023), Gladiator II (2024), and Highest 2 Lowest (2025). Washington has also directed the films Antwone Fisher (2002), The Great Debaters (2007), Fences (2016), and A Journal for Jordan (2021).

On stage, Washington appeared in The Public Theater productions of Coriolanus (1979) and The Tragedy of Richard III (1990). He made his Broadway debut in the Ron Milner play Checkmates (1988). He won the Tony Award for Best Actor in a Play for his role as a disillusioned working class father in the Broadway revival of August Wilson's play Fences (2010). He also performed in the Broadway revivals of William Shakespeare's Julius Caesar (2005) and Othello (2025), Lorraine Hansberry's play A Raisin in the Sun (2014), and Eugene O'Neill's play The Iceman Cometh (2018).

== Early life and education ==
Denzel Hayes Washington Jr. was born on December 28, 1954, in Mount Vernon, New York, a suburb of New York City. His mother, Lennis "Lynne" Lowe, was a beauty parlor owner born in Georgia and partly raised in Harlem, New York. (Note: Attributed to multiple references:) His father, Denzel Hayes Washington Sr., a native of Buckingham County, Virginia, was an ordained Pentecostal minister who also worked for the New York City Water Department and a local S. Klein department store. Washington said his name was originally pronounced with the emphasis on the first syllable. However, his mother started placing the emphasis on the second syllable, so that when she called him, he would respond and not his father.

Washington attended Pennington-Grimes Elementary School in Mount Vernon until 1968. When he was 14, his parents divorced and his mother sent him to Oakland Military Academy, a private preparatory school in New Windsor, New York. Washington later said that attending the academy kept him off the streets and out of prison. After the academy, he attended Mainland High School in Daytona Beach, Florida, from 1970 to 1971.

After high school, Washington attended Fordham University, where he played college basketball under coach P. J. Carlesimo. During a period of indecision about which major to study, he took a semester off and subsequently worked as the creative arts director of an overnight summer camp held at Camp Sloane YMCA in Lakeville, Connecticut. After he participated in a staff talent show, one of his colleagues suggested that he try acting. Upon his return to Fordham, Washington began studying acting at the university's Lincoln Center, where he played the leading roles in Eugene O'Neill's The Emperor Jones and Shakespeare's Othello. After graduating from Fordham with a Bachelor of Arts degree in Drama and Journalism in 1977, he enrolled in graduate school at the American Conservatory Theater in San Francisco, California, where he studied for a year before returning to New York to begin a professional acting career.

== Career ==
=== 1976–1989: Early roles and rise to prominence ===
Washington spent the summer of 1976 in St. Mary's City, Maryland, in summer stock theater performing Wings of the Morning, the Maryland State play, which was written for him by incorporating an African-American character/narrator based loosely on the historical figure from early colonial Maryland, Mathias de Sousa.

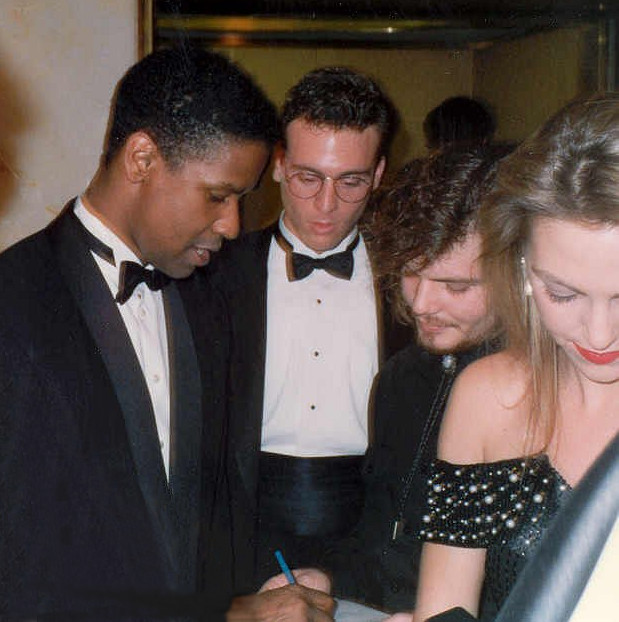
Washington at the 62nd Academy Awards (1990), at which he won Best Supporting Actor for the film Glory

Shortly after graduating from Fordham, Washington made his screen acting debut in the 1977 made-for-television film Wilma, which was a docudrama about sprinter Wilma Rudolph, and made his first Hollywood appearance in the 1981 film Carbon Copy. He shared a 1982 Distinguished Ensemble Performance Obie Award for playing Private First Class Melvin Peterson in the Off-Broadway Negro Ensemble Company production A Soldier's Play which premiered November 20, 1981.

A major career break came when he starred as Dr. Phillip Chandler in NBC's television hospital drama St. Elsewhere, which ran from 1982 to 1988. He was one of only a few African-American actors to appear on the series for its entire six-year run. He also appeared in several television, motion picture and stage roles, such as the films A Soldier's Story (1984), Hard Lessons (1986) and Power (1986). In 1987, he starred as South African anti-apartheid political activist Stephen Biko in Richard Attenborough's Cry Freedom, for which he received his first Academy Award nomination.

In 1989, Washington won the Academy Award for Best Supporting Actor for his portrayal of a defiant and self-possessed ex-slave Civil War soldier in the film Glory. That same year, he appeared in the film The Mighty Quinn; and in For Queen and Country, where he played the conflicted and disillusioned Reuben James, a British soldier who, despite a distinguished military career, returns to a civilian life where racism and inner-city life lead to vigilantism and violence.

=== 1990–1999: Hollywood stardom and acclaim ===
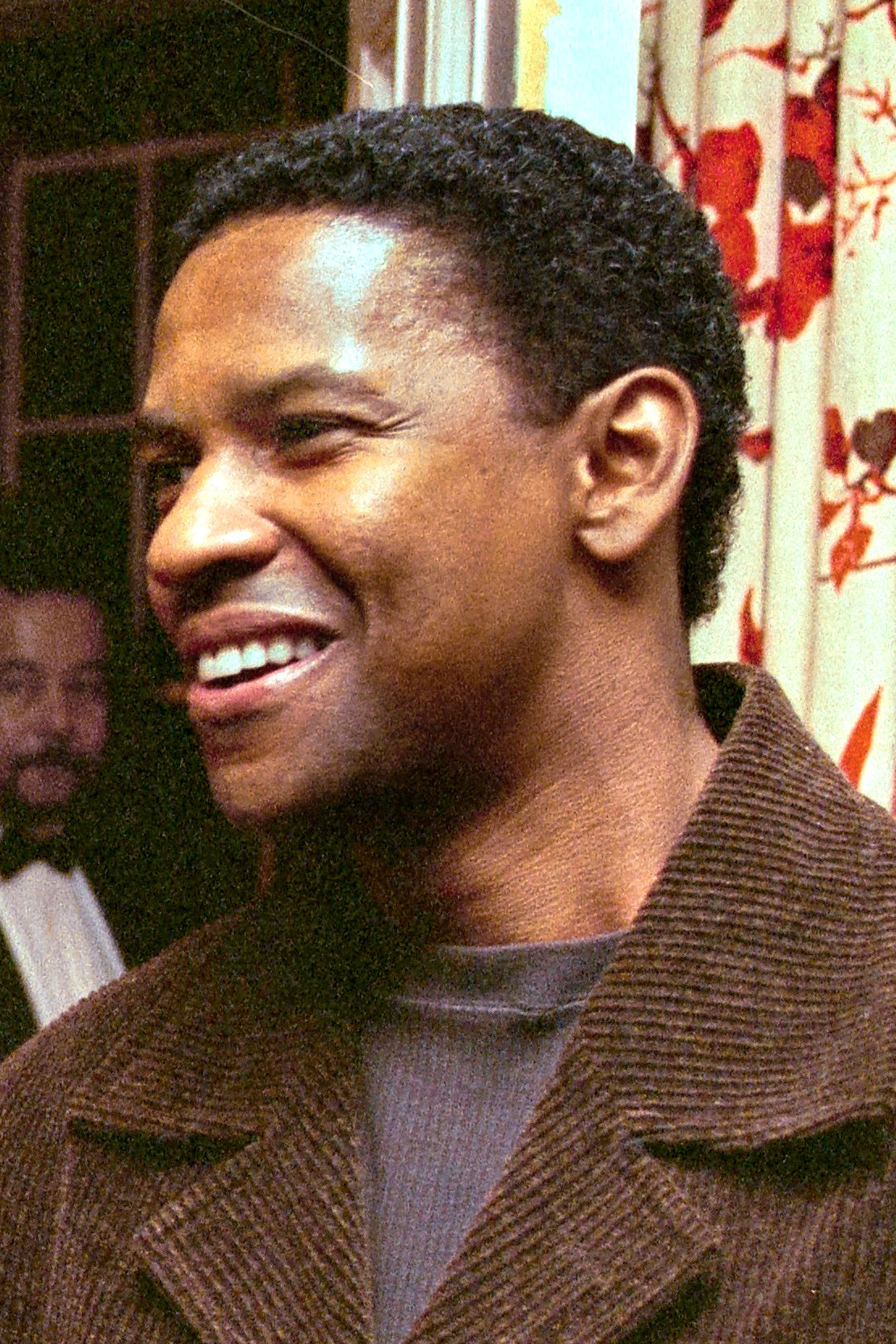
Washington at the White House in 1999

In the summer of 1990, Washington had appeared in the title role of the Public Theater's production of William Shakespeare's Richard III. Mel Gussow of The New York Times praised Washington as "an actor of range and intensity, is expert at projecting a feeling of controlled rage". Also that year, Washington starred as Bleek Gilliam in the Spike Lee film Mo' Better Blues. Charles Murray of Empire praised Washington's performance as a "taut portrayal of the driven musician" and "like all Lee’s film, Mo’ Better Blues is a real ensemble piece, and the standard of the performances is uniformly excellent: but Washington [and] Lee deserve extra plaudits." In 1991, he starred as Demetrius Williams in the Mira Nair directed romantic drama Mississippi Masala opposite Sarita Choudhury. Set primarily in rural Mississippi, the film explores interracial romance between African Americans and Indian Americans. Critic Roger Ebert of The Chicago Sun-Times praised the chemistry of the two leads writing, "Washington is an actor of immense and natural charm, and he makes a good match with Sarita Choudhury".

Washington was reunited with Lee to play one of his most critically acclaimed roles, the title character of the historical epic Malcolm X (1992). The New York Times gave the film its Critic's Pick with Vincent Canby declaring, "In Denzel Washington it also has a fine actor who does for "Malcolm X" what Ben Kingsley did for "Gandhi." Mr. Washington not only looks the part, but he also has the psychological heft, the intelligence and the reserve to give the film the dramatic excitement". His performance as the Black nationalist leader earned him his third Academy Award nomination, the first time in the Lead Actor category. Also that year, he established the production company Mundy Lane Entertainment. The next year, he played the lawyer defending a gay man with AIDS played by Tom Hanks in the Jonathan Demme film Philadelphia (1993). Sight & Sound wrote, "Casting Washington in the lead guaranteed the film the black audience that otherwise might not have had much interest in the problems of a rich white homosexual with Aids. But Aids is rampant in inner cities, where it attacks not just gay men, but IV drug users and women."

During the early and mid-1990s, Washington starred in several successful thrillers, including The Pelican Brief with Julia Roberts in 1993, and Crimson Tide with Gene Hackman in 1995, as well as the Shakespearean comedy Much Ado About Nothing directed by Kenneth Branagh. In 1996, he played a U.S. Army officer who investigates a female chopper commander's worthiness for the Medal of Honor in Courage Under Fire, opposite Meg Ryan. Variety wrote, "All of [the] predicaments are palpably and convincingly registered through Washington’s probing, reserved and sensitively drawn performance in a role that, in another era, might have been played by the likes of a Montgomery Clift or William Holden."

In 1996, he starred alongside Whitney Houston, and Courtney B. Vance in the romantic comedy The Preacher's Wife directed by Penny Marshall. The film is a remake of the 1947 film The Bishop's Wife starring Cary Grant, Loretta Young, and David Niven. In 1998, Washington starred in Spike Lee's film He Got Game. Washington played a father serving a six-year prison term when the prison warden offers him a temporary parole to convince his top-ranked high-school basketball player son (Ray Allen) to sign with the governor's alma mater, Big State. The film was Washington's third collaboration with Lee. The same year he starred in Gregory Hoblit's supernatural horror film Fallen (1998) with John Goodman, James Gandolfini, and Donald Sutherland.

In 1999, Washington acted alongside Angelina Jolie in the crime thriller The Bone Collector. That same year, Washington starred in The Hurricane, a film about boxer Rubin 'Hurricane' Carter, whose conviction for triple murder was overturned after he spent almost 20 years in prison. Although less successful at the box office than The Bone Collector, The Hurricane had a better reception from critics. He received a Silver Bear Award at the Berlin International Film Festival for his role as Carter. Roger Ebert, film critic for The Chicago Sun-Times, wrote of Washington's performance, "This is one of Denzel Washington's great performances, on a par with his work in Malcolm X."

=== 2000–2009: Established actor and action roles ===
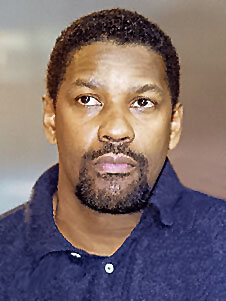
Washington in 2000

Washington won a Golden Globe and received Actor Award and Academy Award nominations for his work in The Hurricane. He was the first Black actor to win the award since Sidney Poitier in 1963. Mick LaSalle of the San Francisco Chronicle declared, "Washington gives a penetrating portrait of life at its most extreme. He takes the viewer into the mind of a man experiencing confinement and physical deprivation. More profoundly, he shows what it's like to deal every day with the torments of wild rage and impotence, despair and hope." In 2000, he portrayed Herman Boone, a high school football coach, in the Disney sports drama film Remember the Titans which grossed over $100 million in the U.S. Andrew O'Hehir of Salon wrote, "Washington is of course the linchpin of Remember the Titans; he's a commanding actor in a commanding role, and as memorable as he was in The Hurricane.

Washington starred as corrupt Los Angeles cop Alonzo Harris in the Antoine Fuqua-directed crime thriller Training Day (2001), acting opposite Ethan Hawke. Roger Ebert wrote, "For Denzel Washington, [it is] a rare villainous role; he doesn't look, sound or move like his usual likable characters...he's like a monster from a horror film, unkillable and implacable." He received Golden Globe and Actor Award nominations and won an Academy Award for Best Actor, becoming the second African-American actor to win the category after Poitier.

In 2002, he starred in the Nick Cassavettes directed healthcare-themed drama John Q. (2002) portraying John Quincy Archibald. Washington acted opposite James Woods, Robert Duvall, and Ray Liotta. The film was a financial success but received mixed reviews with critics praising Washington's performances. BBC film critic Neil Smith wrote, "What credibility there is comes from Washington's intense, humane performance and the supporting players' sterling attempts to rise above the stereotypical roles with which they have been saddled." That same year Washington directed his first film, a well-reviewed drama called Antwone Fisher (2002), in which he also co-starred as a Navy psychiatrist. Stephen Holden of The New York Times praised his direction writing, "Mr. Washington shows a confident grasp of cinematic narrative in a hearty meat-and-potatoes style. But the most remarkable aspect of his behind-the-camera debut is his brilliantly surefooted handling of actors." He also praised his acting adding, "[He] is so sensitively reactive that his performance seems more lived than acted".

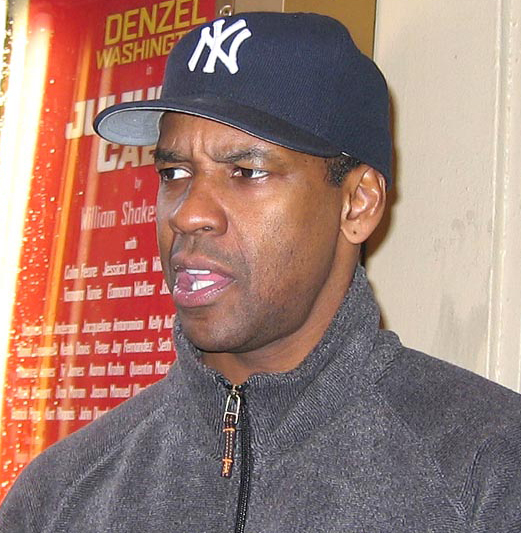
Washington after a performance of Julius Caesar in May 2005

Between 2003 and 2006, Washington appeared in a series of thrillers that performed generally well at the box office, including Carl Franklin's Out of Time opposite Eva Mendez and Tony Scott's Man on Fire alongside Dakota Fanning. In 2004, he acted opposite Meryl Streep in the remake of the 1962 film of the same name, The Manchurian Candidate. In 2006, he starred in Inside Man, a Spike Lee-directed bank heist thriller co-starring Jodie Foster and Clive Owen. Todd McCarthy of Variety wrote, its "flashy cast, clever script and vibrant showcasing of New York City are strong plusses for Spike Lee's most mainstream studio venture". Later that year he starred in the time travel movie Déjà Vu released in November.

In 2005, he was back onstage playing Brutus in the Broadway revival of Julius Caesar. Theatre critic Ben Brantley of The New York Times wrote, "Washington does not embarrass himself, as leading citizens of Hollywood have been known to do on Broadway. But even brilliantined in the glow of his inescapable fame, he can't help getting lost amid the wandering, mismatched crowd and the heavy topical artillery that have been assembled here." Despite mixed reviews, the production's limited run was a consistent sell-out. In 2007, he co-starred with Russell Crowe for the second time (the first was 1995's Virtuosity) in Ridley Scott's crime drama American Gangster, for which he received a Golden Globe nomination. He also directed and starred in the drama The Great Debaters with Forest Whitaker. He next appeared in Tony Scott's 2009 film The Taking of Pelham 123 (a remake of the 1974 thriller of the same name), where he played New York City subway security chief Walter Garber opposite John Travolta's villain.

=== 2010–2019: Return to theater and The Equalizer trilogy ===
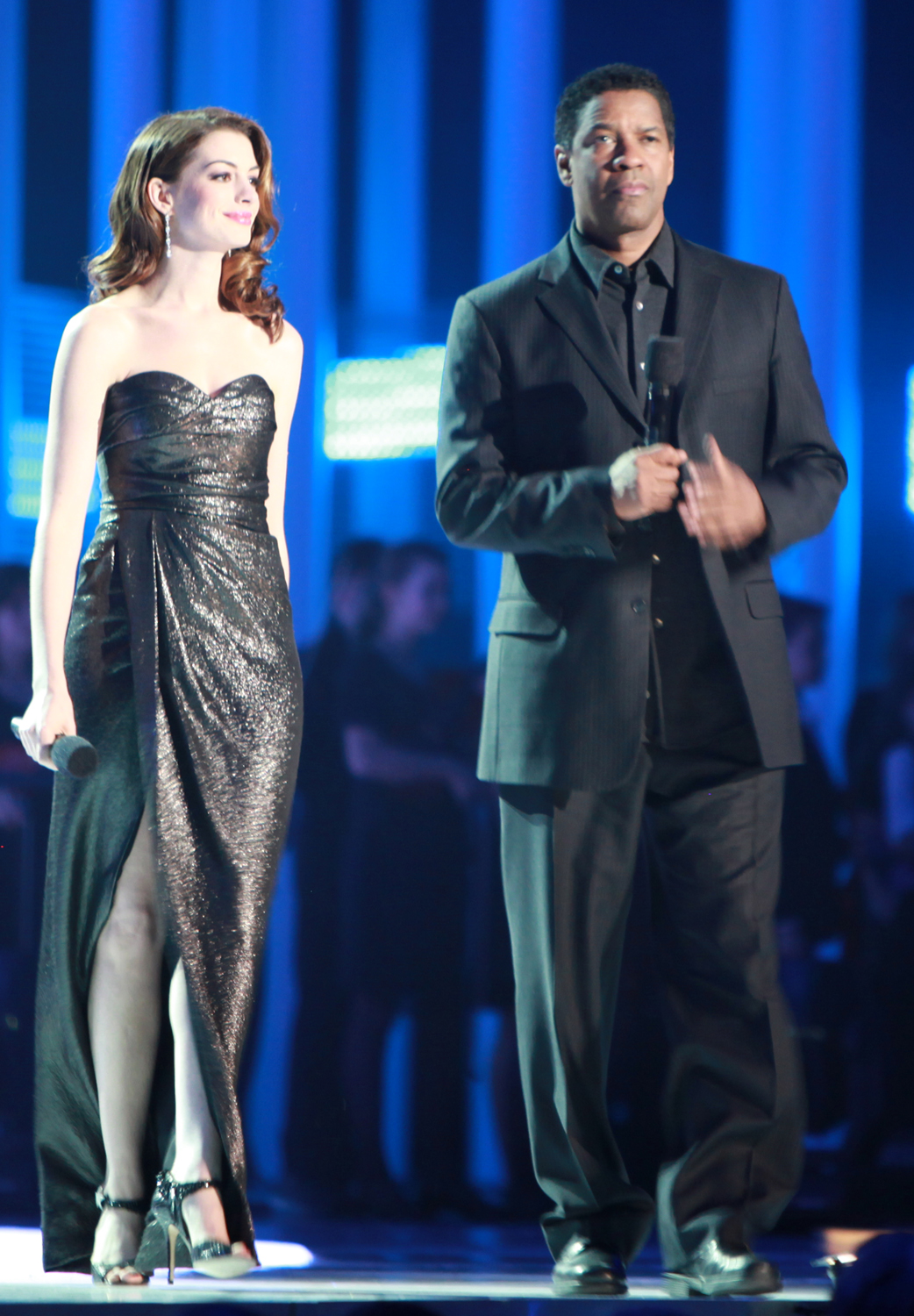
Washington with Anne Hathaway at the Nobel Peace Prize Concert in 2010

Washington returned to Broadway playing Troy Maxson, opposite Viola Davis, in the revival of August Wilson's Fences. Set in 1950s Pittsburgh, Washington plays a former Negro league baseball player working as a garbage collector who struggles to provide for his family and come to terms with the events of his life. Ben Brantley of The New York Times wrote, "Mr. Washington has the fluid naturalness we associate with good screen actors... face and stance alone provide fascinating (and damning) glimpses into Troy’s attitudes toward his son from an earlier relationships". Washington won the Tony Award for Best Actor in a Play for his performance. That same year, Washington starred in The Book of Eli (2010), a post-apocalyptic action-drama set in the near future. Also in 2010, he starred as a veteran railroad engineer in the action film Unstoppable, about an unmanned, half-mile-long runaway freight train carrying dangerous cargo. The film was his fifth and final collaboration with director Tony Scott, following Crimson Tide (1995), Man on Fire (2004), Déjà Vu (2006) and The Taking of Pelham 123 (2009). Washington and Anne Hathaway attended the 2010 Nobel Peace Prize ceremony in Oslo honoring the imprisoned Chinese writer and human rights activist Liu Xiaobo. The following day, they co-hosted the Nobel Peace Prize Concert.

In 2012, Washington starred in Flight, for which he was nominated for the Academy Award for Best Actor for his performance as an alcoholic airline pilot facing investigation for his part in a plane crash. He co-starred with Ryan Reynolds in Safe House, where he prepared for his role by subjecting himself to a torture session that included waterboarding. In 2013, Washington starred in 2 Guns, alongside Mark Wahlberg. From April to June 2014, Washington played the leading role in the Broadway production of Lorraine Hansberry's classic drama A Raisin in the Sun, directed by Kenny Leon. The show received positive reviews and won the Tony Award for Best Revival of a Play. That same year he starred in The Equalizer (2014), an action thriller film directed by Antoine Fuqua and written by Richard Wenk, based on the television series of same name starring Edward Woodward. He reprised his role in his first sequel, The Equalizer 2 (2018) and the third and final sequel, The Equalizer 3 (2023).

In 2016, Washington starred in The Magnificent Seven, a remake of the 1960 western film of the same name, alongside Chris Pratt, Ethan Hawke, Vincent D'Onofrio, Lee Byung-hun, Manuel Garcia-Rulfo, Martin Sensmeier, Haley Bennett, and Peter Sarsgaard. Principal photography began on May 18, 2015, in north Baton Rouge, Louisiana. The film premiered on September 8 at the 2016 Toronto International Film Festival, and was released in the United States in conventional and IMAX theaters on September 23, 2016. In The Magnificent Seven, Washington plays Sam Chisolm ("the Bounty Hunter"), a duly sworn warrant officer from Wichita, Kansas. His character was renamed from Chris Adams (played by Yul Brynner in the original film) to Sam Chisolm. It was Washington's first Western film. He did not watch Westerns growing up, as it was the end of the Western era in the movies. Moreover, he and his siblings were barred from going to the cinema by his father, a minister in a church. They grew up watching Biblical films instead, like King of Kings and The Ten Commandments, although he has said that he watched portions of the shows Rawhide and Bonanza. He did not view the original film in preparation, but has watched Seven Samurai. Fuqua flew to New York City to negotiate with Washington, who accepted the offer.

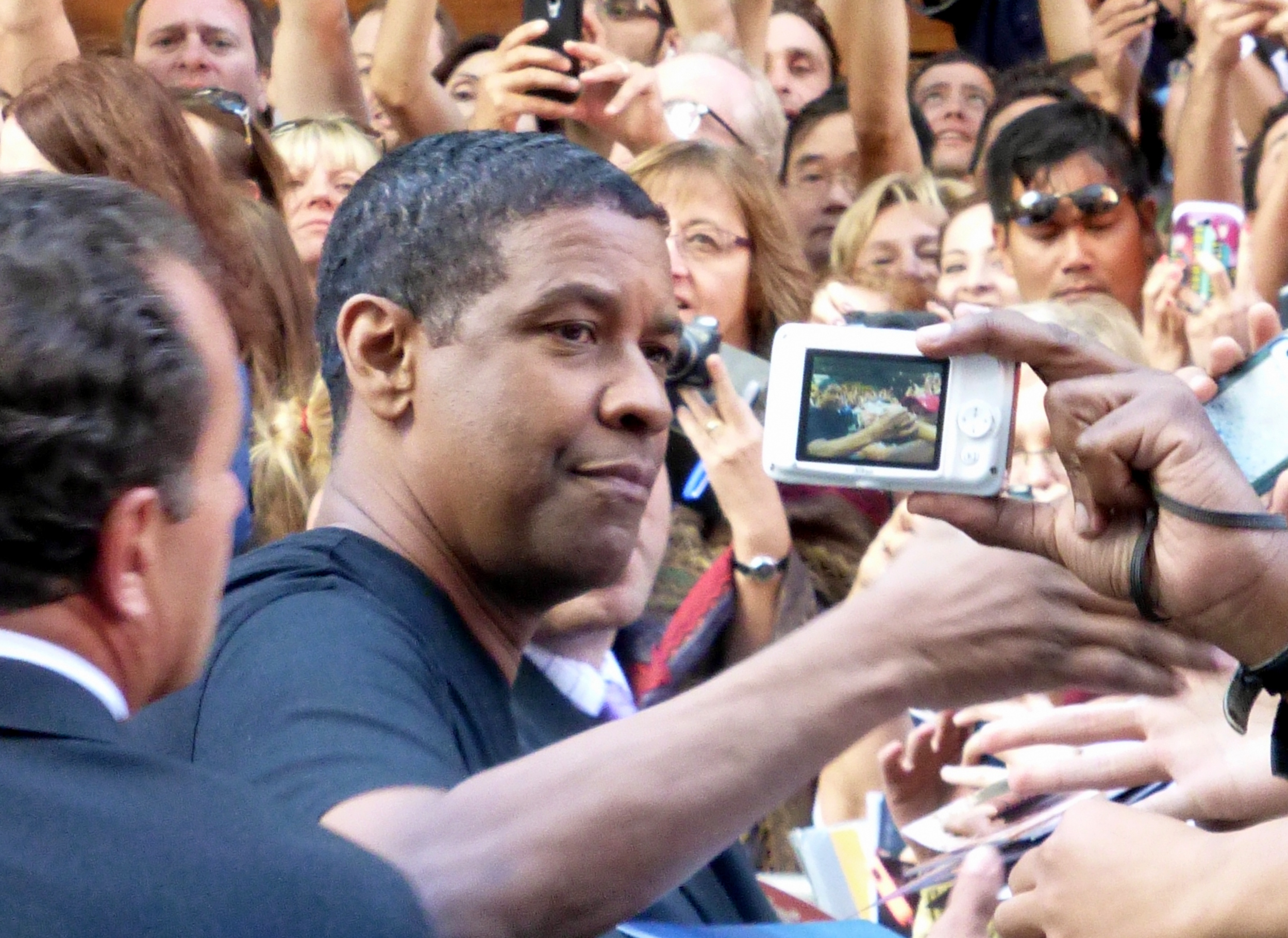
Washington at the premiere of The Equalizer in 2014

In 2016, Washington directed the film Fences, co-starring Viola Davis and Stephen McKinley Henderson and based on August Wilson's play of the same name, with a script by Wilson. He reprised the role of Troy Maxson. The film was released on December 16, 2016, by Paramount Pictures. Owen Gleiberman of Variety wrote, "Washington, as both actor and director, gets the conversation humming with a speed and alacrity that keeps the audience jazzed...Washington tears through it with a joyful ferocity, like a man possessed." For his performance, Washington was nominated for a Golden Globe Award, an Actor Award, and an Academy Award. The film was nominated for three other Oscars, including Best Picture and Best Adapted Screenplay, and won Davis her first Academy Award.

The following year, Washington starred in the legal drama film Roman J. Israel, Esq. (2017). Peter Bradshaw of The Guardian wrote, "[He]'s a star player, styling out his character’s complicated and tricky mix of attributes...However contrived, this character is always fully and comfortably inhabited, and Washington brings off the funny moments". While the film received mixed reviews, his performance was praised by critics and led to nominations for a Golden Globe Award, an Actor Award and an Academy Award (Washington's ninth Oscar nomination overall and his sixth for Best Actor).

Beginning March 22, 2018, Washington starred as Theodore "Hickey" Hickman in a Broadway revival of Eugene O'Neill's The Iceman Cometh. The production, directed by George C. Wolfe, began regular performances April 26 and ran for 14 weeks. Washington received positive reviews with Alexis Soloski of The Guardian writing, "For most of it, Washington is playing Washington, letting his good looks and irrepressible charm do most of the character work, though the play’s most exciting moments are when he lets that charm falter (something he’s also been exploring in his recent film work, too) showing something uglier and more ravaged underneath." He received his second Tony Award nomination.

=== 2020–present ===
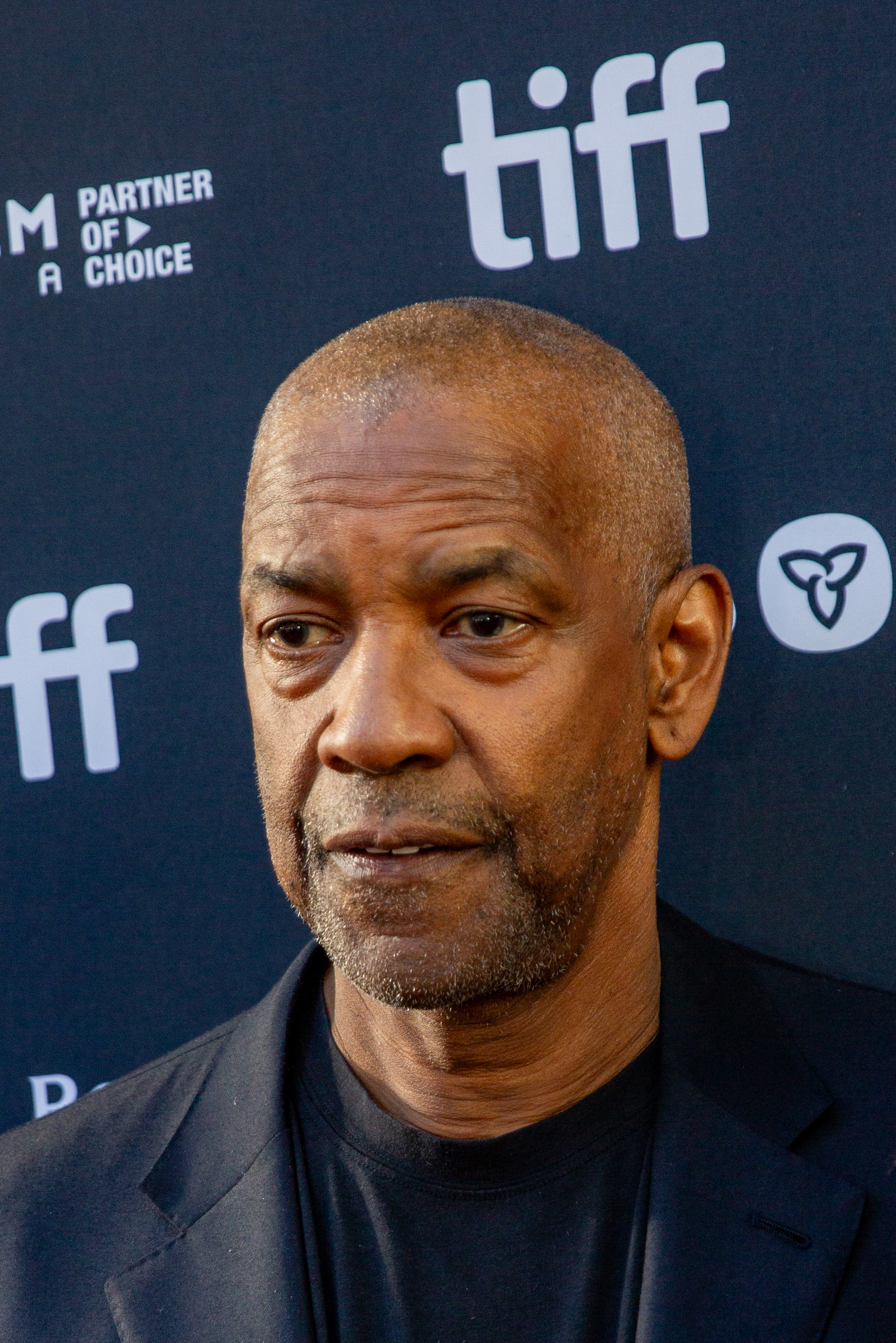
Washington at the 2024 Toronto International Film Festival.

In 2020, he produced the Netflix film adaptation of the August Wilson play Ma Rainey's Black Bottom starring Chadwick Boseman and Viola Davis. The film was directed by George C. Wolfe and received positive reviews. The following year he portrayed Deputy Sheriff Joe "Deke" Deacon in the crime thriller The Little Things opposite Rami Malek and Jared Leto. The film was released during the COVID-19 pandemic and was released in theaters and on HBO Max. Also in 2021, Washington portrayed the titular character in the 2021 film adaptation of the William Shakespeare tragedy Macbeth. He received universal acclaim for his performance and was nominated for several awards, including an Academy Award, an Actor Award, and a Golden Globe Award. That same year, Washington directed the drama A Journal for Jordan, based on the memoir A Journal for Jordan: A Story of Love and Honor by Dana Canedy. It received a wide theatrical release on December 25, 2021 and received mixed reviews from critics.

In 2024, Washington starred in Ridley Scott's epic historical drama Gladiator II alongside Paul Mescal, Pedro Pascal, and Connie Nielsen. The film is a sequel to Scott's Gladiator (2000). Washington's performance was described as scene-stealing and the standout aspect of the film, earning a Golden Globe nomination. In the same year, Washington served as a producer of The Piano Lesson, the Netflix film adaptation of the August Wilson play of the same name directed by his son Malcolm Washington and starring his other son John David Washington.

In 2025, Washington returned to Broadway portraying the title role in a revival of William Shakespeare's play Othello opposite Jake Gyllenhaal as Iago. Kenny Leon helmed over the production, having previously directed Washington in the Broadway revivals of Fences and A Raisin in the Sun. The production and Washington's performance earned mixed reviews from critics. Adrian Horton from The Guardian described the production as "underwhelming" and wrote of his performance, "[He] has moments of sublime melody...the kind of rhapsodic deliveries that feel worth whatever price of admission, but the overall tone of his performance is one of perfunctory hyper-competence." David Rooney of The Hollywood Reporter noted Washington's Hollywood "magnetism" and "swaggering authority" but added, "there’s little evidence of a driving force behind his performance, which is symptomatic of the production overall."

That same year, Washington reunited with Spike Lee on the police procedural drama film Highest 2 Lowest, a remake of the 1963 Akira Kurosawa film High and Low. A joint production between A24 and Apple TV, the film also starred Jeffrey Wright and Ilfenesh Hadera. Washington announced in November, that he would be starring in Black Panther III, set in the Marvel Cinematic Universe. Washington was also cast as Carthaginian general Hannibal in an upcoming Netflix film; the decision was controversial in Tunisia.

== Style and influence ==
Washington has stated that he considers himself a stage actor and not a Hollywood star. He has also cited James Earl Jones as an influence saying, "He is who I wanted to be." He has also stated that Jones is his "hero" and that his college theater career started because of Jones. Washington also cited Sidney Poitier as an acting inspiration saying, "He was a mentor, needless to say, an example, a friend".

Washington has influenced and mentored numerous actors such as Chadwick Boseman, Mahershala Ali, Michael B. Jordan, Jamie Foxx, Will Smith, Jake Gyllenhaal, Austin Butler, and Glen Powell.

== Acting credits and accolades ==
Washington has received numerous accolades including two Academy Awards, a Tony Award, three Golden Globe Awards, an Actor Award and two Silver Bears. He has also received nominations for a Grammy Award and two Primetime Emmy Awards. Washington has also received numerous honorary awards such as the Stanley Kubrick Britannia Award in 2007, the Golden Globe Cecil B. DeMille Award in 2016 and the AFI Life Achievement Award in 2019. He was honored with the Presidential Medal of Freedom in 2025. He is also a 13-time NAACP Image Award winner with four consecutive wins in the Outstanding Actor in a Motion Picture award category from 1993 to 1997 and again from 2000 to 2003.

Over his career he has been recognized by the Academy of Motion Picture Arts and Sciences for the following performances:

| Year | Category | Nominated work | Result | Ref. |
|---|---|---|---|---|
| 1987 | Best Supporting Actor | Cry Freedom | Nominated | |
| 1989 | Best Supporting Actor | Glory | Won | |
| 1992 | Best Actor | Malcolm X | Nominated | |
| 1999 | Best Actor | The Hurricane | Nominated | |
| 2001 | Best Actor | Training Day | Won | |
| 2012 | Best Actor | Flight | Nominated | |
| 2016 | Best Actor | Fences | Nominated | |
| 2017 | Best Actor | Roman J. Israel, Esq. | Nominated | |
| 2021 | Best Actor | The Tragedy of Macbeth | Nominated | |

== Personal life ==
=== Marriage and family ===
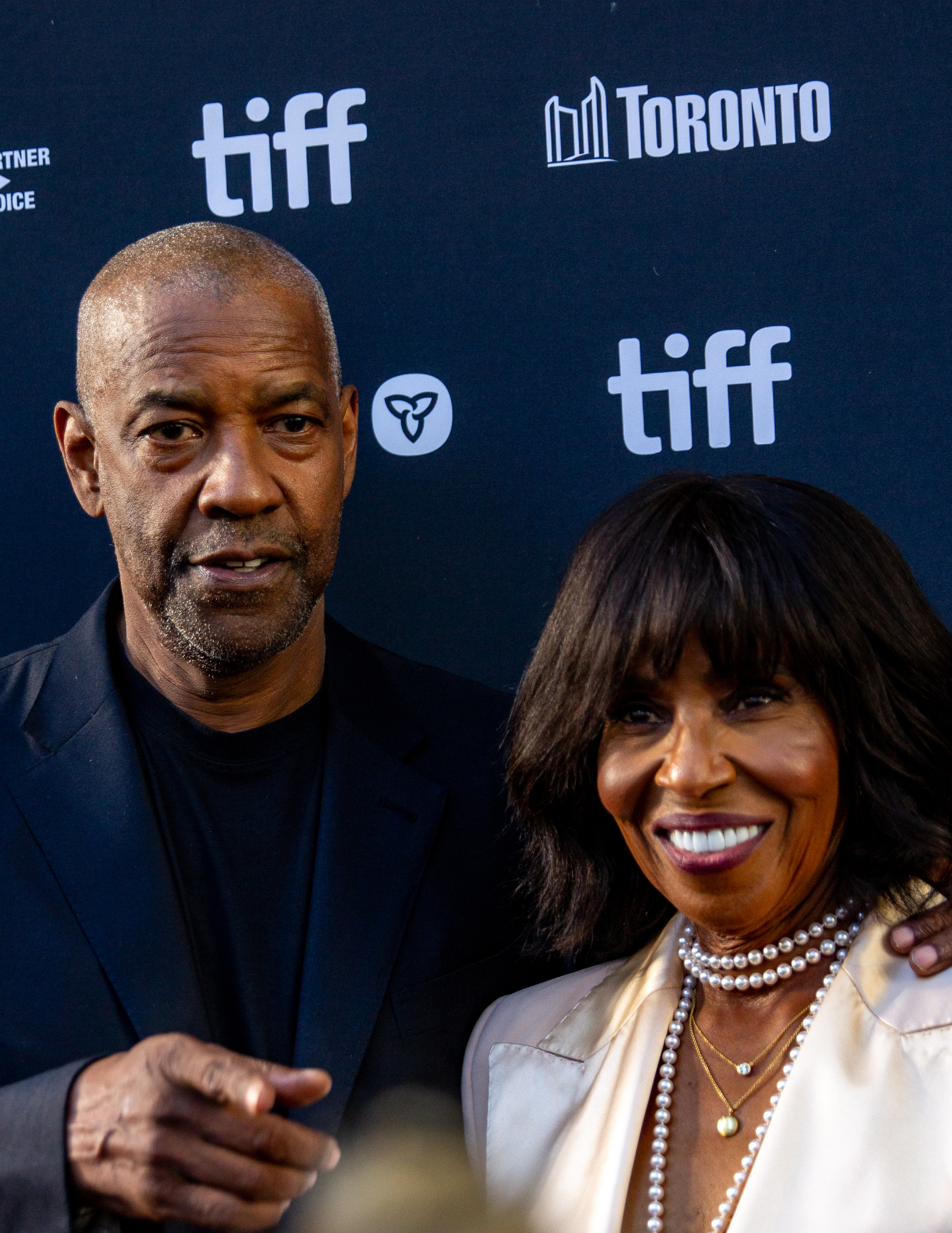
Washington with his wife Pauletta in 2024

On June 25, 1983, Washington married Pauletta Pearson, whom he met on the set of his first screen work, the television film Wilma. They have four children: John David, also an actor and a former football player; Katia, who graduated from Yale University with a Bachelor of Arts in 2010; and twins Olivia and Malcolm. Malcolm graduated from the University of Pennsylvania with a degree in film studies, and Olivia played a role in Lee Daniels's film The Butler. Malcolm made his directorial debut with The Piano Lesson, with Denzel producing and John David starring in it. In 1995, Washington and his wife renewed their wedding vows in South Africa with Desmond Tutu officiating.

=== Religious beliefs ===
Washington is a Holiness Pentecostal Christian and a member of the West Angeles Church of God in Christ, located in Los Angeles. He had long felt a calling to be a pastor. He stated in 1999, "A part of me still says, 'Maybe, Denzel, you're supposed to preach. Maybe you're still compromising.' I've had an opportunity to play great men and, through their words, to preach. I take what talent I've been given seriously, and I want to use it for good." In 1995, he donated US$2.5 million to help build the new West Angeles Church of God in Christ facility in Los Angeles. Washington says he reads the Bible daily. Washington was baptized and received his ministry license from the Kelly Temple Church of God in Christ on December 21, 2024.

=== Activism and service ===
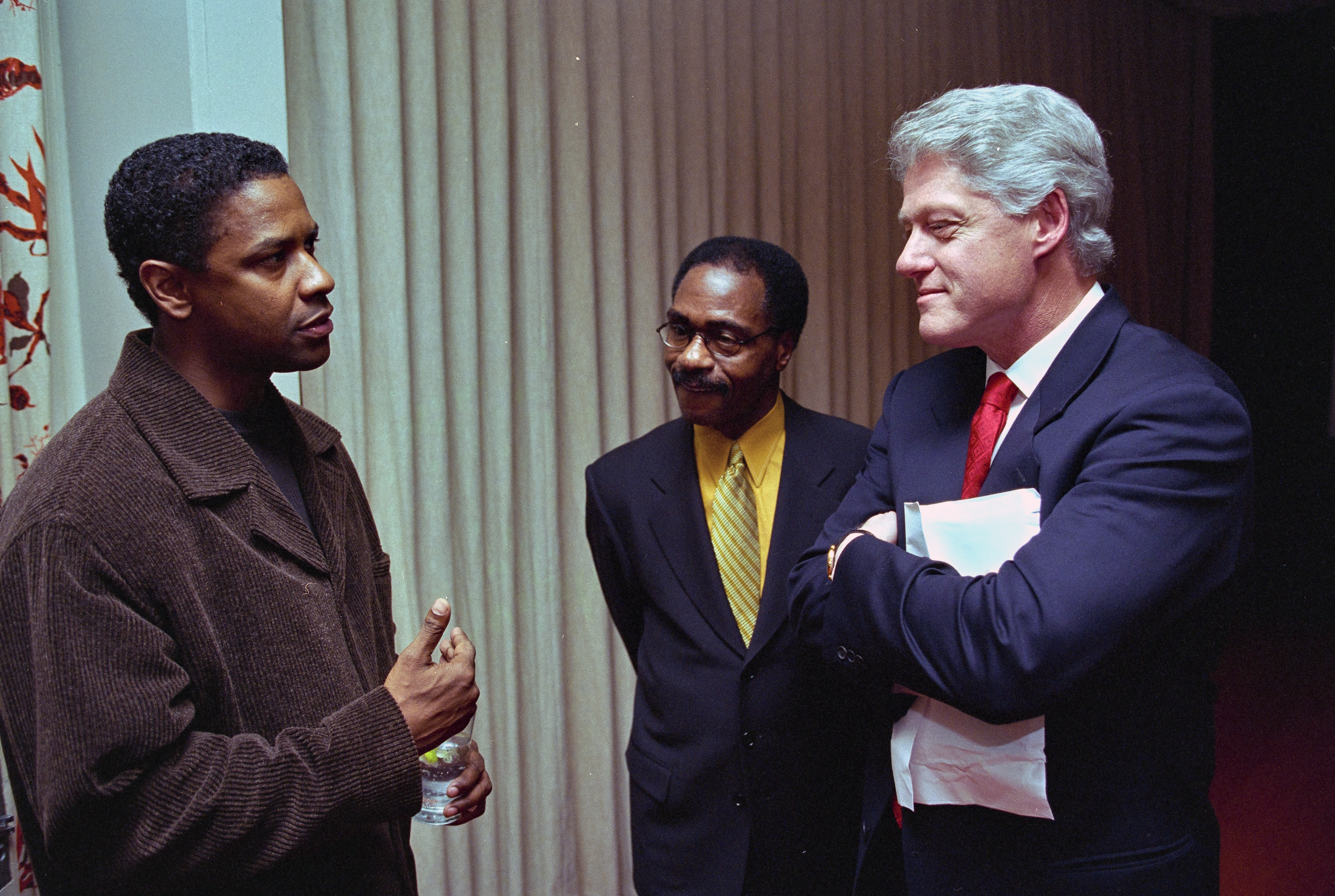
Washington with President Bill Clinton in the White House Family Theater in 1999

Washington has served as the national spokesman for Boys & Girls Clubs of America since 1993, and has appeared in public service announcements and awareness campaigns for the organization. In addition, he has served as a board member for Boys & Girls Clubs of America since 1995. In 2006, for the organization's 100 anniversary, helped put together with Daniel Paisner, a book that underscores the lesson: “If you want to change the world, start by changing the life of a child”. "A hand to guide me" features examples from leaders as they tell their life-changing stories of mentorship, when as youngsters they were guided by a caring adult, which shaped the rest of their life, including over 70 of America's leading personalities in theater, sports, business, and politics such as Presidents Jimmy Carter and Bill Clinton, Whoopi Goldberg, Muhammad Ali, Yogi Berra, Toni Morrison, Cal Ripken Jr. and Colin Powell.

In mid-2004, Washington visited Brooke Army Medical Center (BAMC) at Fort Sam Houston, where he participated in a Purple Heart ceremony, presenting medals to three Army soldiers recovering from wounds they received while stationed in Iraq. He also visited the fort's Fisher House facilities, and after learning that it had exceeded its capacity, made a substantial donation to the Fisher House Foundation; this program focuses on building and providing homes for military personnel and their families free of charge while they receive medical care. Washington's other charitable contributions include US$1 million to Nelson Mandela's Children's Fund in 1995 and US$1 million to Wiley College to resuscitate the college's debate team.

The Revolutionary Armed Forces of Colombia (FARC) named Washington as one of three people (the others being directors Oliver Stone and Michael Moore) with whom they were willing to negotiate for the release of three defense contractors the group had held captive from 2003 to 2008. That effort by FARC was unsuccessful.

On May 18, 1991, Washington was awarded an honorary doctorate from his alma mater, Fordham University, for having "impressively succeeded in exploring the edge of his multifaceted talent". In 2011, he donated US$2 million to Fordham for an endowed chair of the theater department, as well as US$250,000 to establish a theater-specific scholarship at the school.

Denzel Washington Chair recipients include:

- Michael Potts
- Dominique Morisseau
- Tonya Pinkins

He also received an honorary Doctorate of Humanities from Morehouse College on May 20, 2007, and an honorary Doctor of Arts degree from the University of Pennsylvania on May 16, 2011.

On October 11, 2021, the United States Army made Washington the 2021 Honorary Sergeant Major of the Army at the Annual Association of the U.S. Army conference for his work with the Fisher House Foundation (providing free homes for military families while receiving medical care). Sergeant Major of the Army Michael A. Grinston presented Washington with the award and said that Washington represented everything he was looking for in this year's honoree: humility, dedication to soldiers, and respect for the Army. In 2022, Washington was supposed to receive the Presidential Medal of Freedom, but it was delayed. Consequently, he received it in 2025.

== See also ==
- List of black Tony Award winners and nominees
- List of African-American actors
- List of black Academy Award winners and nominees
- List of actors with Academy Award nominations
- List of actors with more than one Academy Award nomination in the acting categories
- List of actors with two or more Academy Awards in acting categories
- List of black Golden Globe Award winners and nominees
- List of Golden Globe winners
