= Training Day =

2001 film directed by Antoine Fuqua

- Theatrical release poster
- Directed by: Antoine Fuqua
- Written by: David Ayer
- Produced by: Bobby Newmyer; Jeffrey Silver
- Starring: Denzel Washington; Ethan Hawke; Scott Glenn; Cliff Curtis; Dr. Dre; Snoop Dogg
- Cinematography: Mauro Fiore
- Edited by: Conrad Buff
- Music by: Mark Mancina
- Production companies: Village Roadshow Pictures; NPV Entertainment; Outlaw Productions
- Distributed by: Warner Bros. Pictures
- Release dates: September 2, 2001 (Venice); October 5, 2001 (United States)
- Running time: 122 minutes
- Country: United States
- Language: English
- Budget: $45 million
- Box office: $104.9 million

Training Day is a 2001 American crime thriller film directed by Antoine Fuqua and written by David Ayer. It stars Denzel Washington as Alonzo Harris and Ethan Hawke as Jake Hoyt, two LAPD narcotics officers followed over a 24-hour period in the gang-ridden neighborhoods of Westlake, Echo Park, and South Central Los Angeles. It also features Scott Glenn, Eva Mendes, Cliff Curtis, Dr. Dre, Snoop Dogg, and Macy Gray in supporting roles.

Training Day premiered at the Venice Film Festival on September 2, 2001, and was released on October 5, 2001, by Warner Bros. Pictures. It received generally positive reviews from critics, who praised Washington and Hawke's performances but were divided on the screenplay. The film grossed $104.9 million against a $45 million budget. The film received numerous accolades and nominations, with Washington's performance earning him the Academy Award for Best Actor and Hawke being nominated for Best Supporting Actor at the 74th Academy Awards.

A television series based on the film, produced by Jerry Bruckheimer, was announced in August 2015 and premiered on February 2, 2017, on CBS. Only Noel Gugliemi, Tom Berenger and Raymond J. Barry reprised their roles. The show was cancelled after one season.

== Plot ==
Jake Hoyt, a young, ambitious LAPD officer, is assigned to work with Detective Alonzo Harris, a highly decorated narcotics officer, for a one-day evaluation to determine if Jake will be invited to join his narcotics squad. Alonzo immediately shows a very dominant and unorthodox approach to police work.

Driving around in Alonzo's Monte Carlo, they begin the day by catching some college students buying marijuana. Alonzo confiscates the marijuana, puts it into a pipe and tells Jake to smoke it. When Jake refuses, Alonzo threatens him at gunpoint stating that such a refusal while on the streets would get him killed. After Alonzo ostensibly ends his evaluation, Jake relents and smokes the pipe, getting high. Alonzo then reveals that the marijuana was laced with PCP.

Alonzo introduces Jake to Roger, a drug dealer. After they leave, Jake notices a pair of drug addicts attempting to rape a girl in an alley. Jake stops the attack and subdues the addicts, while Alonzo watches without helping. Alonzo menaces the addicts, but refuses to arrest them. Jake then finds and keeps the girl's wallet which was left behind.

Later, Alonzo and Jake apprehend a wheelchair-using dealer named Blue, who has crack rocks and a loaded handgun in his possession. Rather than go to jail, Blue informs on his employer Kevin "Sandman" Miller, who is in prison. Using a fake search warrant, Alonzo steals $40,000 from Sandman's home. As they leave, they get into a shootout with local thugs. At lunch, the two visit Alonzo's mistress Sara and her young son.

Next, Jake accompanies Alonzo to a meeting at a restaurant with a trio of corrupt, high-ranking law-enforcement officials. Aware that the Russian mafia is hunting Alonzo, they suggest he skip town. Alonzo insists he has control of the situation and trades the $40,000 for an arrest warrant on Roger.

Alonzo assembles his squad of narcotics officers including Jake, and they return to Roger's house with the warrant to search for his stash. They find over $4 million in cash. Alonzo leads the team in pocketing some of the money, explaining they will only turn in $3 million. Jake refuses to take his share of the money, worrying Alonzo and the other officers. Alonzo executes Roger after Jake refuses to kill him, staging the scene with his men to make Jake appear to be the shooter. Jeff, another corrupt officer, offers to take some shots to reveal it as a shootout, but one of the bullets penetrates his bulletproof vest. Jake subsequently gets into a standoff with the corrupt officers as he refuses to corroborate their story. Alonzo then reveals he has orchestrated the day's events to have leverage over Jake and threatens him with the police department's post-incident blood test, which will detect the PCP Jake smoked and end his career. Alonzo promises to protect Jake from the drug test if he stands down. Jake reluctantly complies.

Later that evening, Alonzo drives Jake to the home of a Sureño gangster named Smiley for an errand. As he waits for Alonzo, Jake reluctantly plays poker with Smiley and his fellow gang members, Sniper and Moreno. Smiley then explains Alonzo's situation: Alonzo got into a fight with a high-level Russian mobster in Las Vegas and killed him. Alonzo must pay $1 million dollars as compensation before midnight, or be killed himself. Additionally, Smiley reveals that Alonzo has abandoned Jake and paid Smiley to kill him. Jake attempts to flee but is beaten and dragged to the bathroom to be executed. Moreno searches Jake for money and finds the wallet of the girl Jake saved from the attempted rape earlier, who is revealed to be Smiley's cousin. After calling her and confirming that Jake saved her, Smiley spares Jake's life and releases him.

Jake returns to Sara's apartment to confront Alonzo. A gunfight and chase ensue, and Alonzo is eventually subdued on the street while the entire neighborhood gathers to watch. Alonzo offers money to whoever kills Jake, but the neighborhood residents, tired of Alonzo's tyranny, refuse to help. Jake takes the stolen money to submit as evidence against Alonzo, and the neighborhood gang allows him to leave safely.

Desperate, Alonzo then attempts to flee to Los Angeles International Airport, but is ambushed and gunned down by a Russian hit squad. Jake returns home, with radio news coverage reporting Alonzo's death in voiceover, echoing the false narrative Alonzo had used to threaten Jake during their earlier standoff at Roger's house.

== Cast ==
- Denzel Washington as Detective Alonzo Harris (LAPD)
- Ethan Hawke as Officer Jake Hoyt (LAPD)
- Scott Glenn as Roger
- Tom Berenger as Stan Gursky (LA County DA's Office)
- Harris Yulin as Detective Doug Rosselli (LAPD)
- Raymond J. Barry as Captain Lou Jacobs (LAPD)
- Cliff Curtis as Smiley
- Jason Lopez as Merit
- Dr. Dre as Paul (LAPD)
- Snoop Dogg as Blue
- Macy Gray as Sandman's wife
- Charlotte Ayanna as Lisa
- Eva Mendes as Sara
- Nick Chinlund as Tim (LAPD)
- Jaime P. Gomez as Mark (LAPD)
- Raymond Cruz as Sniper
- Noel Gugliemi as Moreno
- Kyjel N. Jolly as Alonzo's son
- Peter Greene as Jeff (LAPD) (uncredited)
- Samantha Esteban as Letty
- Cle Shaheed Sloan as Bone
- Terry Crews as a gang member (uncredited)

== Production ==
=== Development ===
Although corruption in the LAPD's C.R.A.S.H. unit was yet to be exposed when Training Day was written, Antoine Fuqua has stated that the emergence of the Rampart Scandal in the late 1990s catalyzed the completion of the film. Denzel Washington also grew a beard in order to emulate the appearance of Rafael Pérez, an LAPD narcotics officer involved in multiple scandals. Fuqua wanted Washington's character to be seductive and part of a machine, and not just a random rogue cop. In Washington's own words: "I think in some ways he's done his job too well. He's learned how to manipulate, how to push the line further and further, and, in the process, he's become more hard-core than some of the guys he's chasing."

Fuqua also saw Ethan Hawke's character as generally honorable but so driven by ambition that he was willing to compromise his principles, particularly when following the charming and persuasive example of Washington's character. He has said that he fought with studio executives who wanted to cut the Three Wise Men scene, thinking it slowed the film. He insisted that the scene was pivotal in establishing that at least some of Alonzo's illegal actions were sanctioned by his superiors who regarded unethical behavior as a necessary evil.

Fuqua wanted Training Day to look as authentic as possible, and he shot on location in some of the most infamous neighborhoods of Los Angeles. He even obtained permission to shoot in the Imperial Courts housing project, the first time L.A. street gangs had allowed a film crew to be brought into that neighborhood. The crew also filmed in Hoover Block and Baldwin Village. Parts of the film were shot on the dead end street Palmwood Drive, where Black P. Stones gang members were seen on the rooftops. Cle Shaheed Sloan, the gang technical advisor of Training Day, managed to get on screen real-life gang members from Rollin' 60 Crips, PJ Watts Crips, and Black P. Stones. According to Fuqua, the actors and crew ended up receiving a warm welcome from local residents. When he was unable to shoot a scene directly on location, he recreated the locations on sets.

There were also two police officers on hand as technical advisors, Michael Patterson and Paul Lozada (the latter from the San Francisco Police Department). Washington, Hawke and other cast members also met with undercover police officers, local drug dealers, and gang members to help understand their roles better.

=== Casting ===
Davis Guggenheim was originally attached to direct the film, with Matt Damon as Jake Hoyt and Samuel L. Jackson as Alonzo Harris. Once Washington became attached to the project, he requested to have Guggenheim replaced with Fuqua. Eminem was offered the role of Hoyt, but turned it down in order to focus on preparing for 8 Mile (2002). Tobey Maguire, Paul Walker, Freddie Prinze Jr., Ryan Phillippe, and Scott Speedman all auditioned for the role of Hoyt.

=== Music ===
A soundtrack to the film was released on September 11, 2001, by Priority Records. It peaked at 35 on the Billboard 200 and 19 on the Top R&B/Hip-Hop Albums and spawned two hit singles, Nelly's "#1" and Dr. Dre and DJ Quik's "Put It on Me".

The film's score was composed by Mark Mancina, who had previously scored Antoine Fuqua's Bait (2000). Discussing his approach to Training Day, Mancina said, "I did something nobody was doing – an ambient score against a gritty picture." Rather than using what he considered the more predictable choice of a hip-hop-oriented score, Mancina sought a multicultural sound that reflected the diversity of Los Angeles. He recalled, "Instead of doing the predictable hip-hop sound, I did something multi-cultural to reflect Los Angeles, which is full of all sorts of styles of music and people." Mancina also incorporated Asian-influenced instrumentation into the score. According to the composer, Fuqua was initially uncertain about this unconventional approach, but eventually came to appreciate its contribution to the film.

== Release ==
Training Day was originally scheduled for release on September 21, 2001, and had a strong advertising push. However, following the September 11 attacks, the film was pushed back to October 5, 2001, replacing Collateral Damage's original release date.

=== Home media ===
Training Day was released on DVD and VHS on March 19, 2002. A Blu-ray version was released on August 1, 2006. A 4K Blu-ray version was released on February 28, 2023.

On May 1, 2012, a triple feature Blu-ray pack with Training Day, John Q. and The Pelican Brief premiered.

== Reception ==
=== Box office ===
Training Day opened at number one, grossing $22.5 million, ahead of fellow new release Serendipity in second place. Upon opening, it achieved the second-highest October opening weekend, behind Meet the Parents. It repeated in the top spot in its second weekend, above that week's new release of Bandits in second place, and spent its first six weeks in the Top 10 at the box office. It went on to gross $76.6 million in the United States and Canada, and $28.2 million in other territories, for a worldwide total of $104.9 million, against a budget of $45 million.

=== Critical response ===
On the review aggregator website Rotten Tomatoes, 74% of 170 critics' reviews are positive. The website's consensus reads: "The ending may be less than satisfying, but Denzel Washington reminds us why he's such a great actor in this taut and brutal police drama." Metacritic, which uses a weighted average, assigned the film a score of 71 out of 100, based on 36 critics, indicating "generally favorable" reviews. Audiences polled by CinemaScore gave the film an average grade of "B+" on an A+ to F scale.

Chicago Sun-Times film critic Roger Ebert said: "Washington seems to enjoy a performance that's over the top and down the other side". Ebert gave the film three out of four stars, praising both the lead and supporting actors and the film's gritty, kinetic energy. He criticized the plot's implausibility, but praised its execution, stating: "Ayer's screenplay is ingenious in the way it plants clues and pays them off in unexpected ways, so that Training Day makes as much sense as movies like this usually can." Jeffrey Westhoff of Northwest Herald gave the film a two out of four rating, stating that "it aims to be a contemporary L.A. Confidential - but crumples with a simplistic, unbelievable climax."

Writing in The Hollywood Reporter, Michael Rechtshaffen gave the film a positive review, stating: "Denzel Washington ventures into the dark side as a seriously corrupt narcotics cop... and the results are electrifying. So is the picture, thanks to taut, sinewy direction by Antoine Fuqua and a compelling script by David Ayer."

Denzel Washington's performance as Detective Alonzo Harris was highly praised by critics. In The Village Voice, Amy Taubin wrote that the film "offers the unsettling spectacle of Denzel Washington, whose old-fashioned combination of decency and sexiness suggests the African American counterpart to Gregory Peck (in his To Kill a Mockingbird period), as an LAPD cop so evil he makes Harvey Keitel's Bad Lieutenant look like even smaller potatoes than he was meant to be".

=== Accolades ===
Award	Ceremony date	Category	Recipient(s)	Result
Academy Awards	March 24, 2002	Best Actor	Denzel Washington	Won
Academy Awards	March 24, 2002	Best Supporting Actor	Ethan Hawke	Nominated
American Film Institute Awards	January 5, 2002	Actor of the Year – Male – Movies	Denzel Washington	Won
All Def Movie Awards	February 25, 2016	Most Quoted Movie		Nominated
All Def Movie Awards	February 25, 2016	Best Bad Mu#&a Award	Denzel Washington	Won
ALMA Awards	May 18, 2002	Outstanding Supporting Actress in a Motion Picture	Eva Mendes	Nominated
ALMA Awards	May 18, 2002	Excellence in Make-Up in Television and Film	Ken Diaz and Jay Wejebe	Won
ASCAP Film and Television Music Awards		Most Performed Song from a Motion Picture	"#1" – Nelly and Waiel "Wally" Yaghnam	Won
Awards Circuit Community Awards		Best Actor in a Leading Role	Denzel Washington	Runner-up
Awards Circuit Community Awards		Best Actor in a Supporting Role	Ethan Hawke	Nominated
BET Awards	June 25, 2002	Best Actor	Denzel Washington (also for John Q.)	Nominated
Black Reel Awards	April 21, 2002	Best Film		Won
Black Reel Awards	April 21, 2002	Best Director	Antoine Fuqua	Won
Black Reel Awards	April 21, 2002	Best Actor	Denzel Washington	Won
Black Reel Awards	April 21, 2002	Best Film Poster		Won
Black Reel Awards	April 21, 2002	Best Original Soundtrack		Nominated
Black Reel Awards	April 21, 2002	Best Original Song	"#1" – Nelly	Nominated
BMI Film & TV Awards		Film Music Award	Mark Mancina	Won
Boston Society of Film Critics Awards	December 16, 2001	Best Actor	Denzel Washington	Won (Note: Tied with Brian Cox for L.I.E..)
Chicago Film Critics Association Awards	February 25, 2002	Best Actor	Denzel Washington	Nominated
Dallas–Fort Worth Film Critics Association Awards	January 3, 2002	Best Actor	Denzel Washington	Nominated
Festival Nazionale del Doppiaggio Voci nell'Ombra		Best Male Voice (Film Award)	Francesco Pannofino (for dubbing Denzel Washington)	Won
Festival Nazionale del Doppiaggio Voci nell'Ombra		Best Male Voice (Audience Award)	Francesco Pannofino (for dubbing Denzel Washington)	Won
Golden Globe Awards	January 20, 2002	Best Actor in a Motion Picture – Drama	Denzel Washington	Nominated
Golden Schmoes Awards		Best Actor of the Year	Denzel Washington	Nominated
Kansas City Film Critics Circle Awards		Best Actor	Denzel Washington	Won
Las Vegas Film Critics Society Awards		Best Actor	Denzel Washington	Nominated
Los Angeles Film Critics Association Awards	December 15, 2001	Best Actor	Denzel Washington	Won
MTV Movie Awards	June 1, 2002	Best Villain	Denzel Washington	Won
MTV Movie Awards	June 1, 2002	Best Line	"King Kong ain't got nothin' on me!" (Note: In the film, the original line is "King Kong ain't got shit on me!".)	Nominated
MTV Movie Awards	June 1, 2002	Best Cameo	Snoop Dogg	Won
MTV Video Music Awards	August 29, 2002	Best Video from a Film	"#1" – Nelly	Nominated
NAACP Image Awards	March 3, 2002	Outstanding Motion Picture		Nominated
NAACP Image Awards	March 3, 2002	Outstanding Actor in a Motion Picture	Denzel Washington	Won
National Society of Film Critics Awards	January 4, 2002	Best Actor	Denzel Washington	2nd Place
New York Film Critics Circle Awards	January 6, 2002	Best Actor	Denzel Washington	Runner-up
Online Film Critics Society Awards	January 2, 2002	Best Actor	Denzel Washington	Nominated
Satellite Awards	January 19, 2002	Best Actor in a Motion Picture – Drama	Denzel Washington	Nominated
Screen Actors Guild Awards	March 10, 2002	Outstanding Performance by a Male Actor in a Leading Role	Denzel Washington	Nominated
Screen Actors Guild Awards	March 10, 2002	Outstanding Performance by a Male Actor in a Supporting Role	Ethan Hawke	Nominated
Taurus World Stunt Awards	May 2002	Best Work with a Vehicle	Brian Machleit and Robert Powell	Nominated

In June 2003, the American Film Institute named Alonzo Harris the 50th greatest screen villain of all time in its list AFI's 100 Years...100 Heroes & Villains.

In July 2025, it was one of the films voted for the "Readers' Choice" edition of The New York Times' list of "The 100 Best Movies of the 21st Century," finishing at number 250.

== Related projects ==
=== TV series adaptation ===
On August 7, 2015, it was announced that Antoine Fuqua had decided to develop a television series based on the movie, and had teamed with Jerry Bruckheimer to develop the concept. Warner Bros. Television was shopping the show to the American broadcast networks. Will Beall was set to write the series, with Fuqua serving as executive producer, and director of the potential pilot. CBS ordered a pilot on August 14, 2015. In addition to Fuqua, Bruckheimer, Beall, and Jonathan Littman served as executive producers for the series, which is set 15 years after the original film. In May 2016, CBS picked up the series, and by December filming for the first season concluded.

The series, starring Bill Paxton and Justin Cornwell, premiered on February 2, 2017, with a 13-episode run as a mid-season replacement. Paxton died later that month after the airing of the fourth episode. The series ended the season as the lowest rated drama series on CBS that season, and was immediately canceled. Alonzo is mentioned in the series by Deputy Chief Joy Lockhart when briefing Officer Kyle Craig on sending him undercover at LAPD's Special Investigation Section to investigate Detective Frank Roarke. Frank briefly mentions Alonzo at the end of the first season.

=== Prequel ===
In October 2019, it was reported that Warner Bros. was developing a prequel to Training Day. The prequel follows a young Alonzo Harris in late April 1992, two days before the verdict of the Rodney King trial and the associated L.A. riots. The prequel, named Training Day: Day of the Riot, was set to start production in California in February 2022. In March 2025, Fuqua confirmed the project was still in development, that he would not direct it, and that the script was still under revision.

== See also ==
- Denzel Washington on screen and stage
- List of hood films
- Crown Vic (2019 film)
