= Roman J. Israel, Esq. =

2017 film by Dan Gilroy

- Theatrical release poster
- Directed by: Dan Gilroy
- Written by: Dan Gilroy
- Produced by: Todd Black; Jennifer Fox; Denzel Washington
- Starring: Denzel Washington; Colin Farrell
- Cinematography: Robert Elswit
- Edited by: John Gilroy
- Music by: James Newton Howard
- Production companies: Columbia Pictures; Macro Media; Topic Studios; Cross Creek Pictures; Bron Creative; The Culture China/Image Nation Abu Dhabi Content Fund; Escape Artists
- Distributed by: Sony Pictures Releasing
- Release dates: September 10, 2017 (TIFF); November 17, 2017 (United States)
- Running time: 122 minutes
- Country: United States
- Language: English
- Budget: $22 million
- Box office: $13 million

Roman J. Israel, Esq. is a 2017 American legal drama film written and directed by Dan Gilroy. The film stars Denzel Washington and Colin Farrell, and follows the life of a civil-rights advocate and defense lawyer (Washington), who finds himself in a tumultuous series of events that lead to a personal crisis and the necessity for extreme action.

The project was announced on August 25, 2016, as Gilroy's next directorial effort titled Inner City, but was renamed on June 22, 2017. Principal photography began in March 2017, and took place in Los Angeles and Santa Clarita, California.

Roman J. Israel, Esq. premiered at the 2017 Toronto International Film Festival on September 9, 2017, and was theatrically released in the United States by Sony Pictures Releasing on November 17, 2017. The film underperformed at the box office, grossing just $13 million against its $22 million budget, and received mixed reviews from critics, with criticism towards the pacing and the plot, but acclaim towards Washington's performance, for which he was nominated as Best Actor for the Academy Award, Screen Actors Guild Award, and Golden Globe Award.

== Plot ==
Roman J. Israel is a lawyer earning $500 a week at a small law firm in Los Angeles. In his two-partner office, Roman is responsible for preparing briefs, often focusing on the civil rights of clients, while William Jackson, the firm's founder and a well-respected professor, focuses on the courtroom appearances with which Roman struggles. Roman has spent years developing a brief that he believes will bring reform to the unfair use of plea bargaining to induce guilty pleas in the justice system. Though short on social skills, Roman is gifted with a phenomenal memory, as well as strong personal convictions, which he has pursued at the expense of family.

Jackson suffers a fatal heart attack and the firm, saddled with debt, will close. Jackson's former student, George Pierce, handles the unwinding of the firm, and impressed by Roman's legal mind, offers him a job at Pierce's own large firm. Roman initially rejects this offer, believing that Pierce is simply a greedy lawyer. He meets Maya during a job interview at a local activist network. The interview does not go well, but Maya asks him to speak at an upcoming meeting organizing a protest. Struggling to find a job elsewhere, Roman reluctantly takes up Pierce's job offer.

Roman is a poor fit at his new firm, clashing with senior partner Jesse Salinas over a joke Salinas makes about battered women. After attempting to interest Pierce in his brief, Roman is disappointed to be assigned to handle clients. One such client is Derrell Ellerbee, a young man arrested for murder, who tells Roman that he is willing to divulge the whereabouts of the actual shooter, Carter "CJ" Johnson, and will testify against him. When Roman can't find Pierce, he tries to negotiate a plea deal with the district attorney. The prosecutor rejects his offer, and hangs up on Roman after he insults her unsympathetic counteroffer. As a consequence, Ellerbee is also denied the protective custody he begged for in prison and is murdered as a snitch.

After Roman is berated by Pierce for mishandling Ellerbee's case, he is mugged by a homeless man he attempted to help. This results in Roman becoming downcast and cynical, illegally using the information he received from Ellerbee to anonymously collect the $100,000 reward for Johnson's location. Roman indulges in luxuries he had previously eschewed. Pierce apologizes to Roman for the earlier confrontation and for forcing him out of the shadows, accepting that he thrives working behind the scenes as he did at his old firm. At a firm-wide meeting, Pierce presents plans that raise prices for paying clients and establishes a new pro bono effort headed by Roman.

Maya calls Roman to ask him out on a date, where she shares some of her struggles with idealism and thanks Roman for inspiring her. Pierce invites Roman to a luxury box, where he shares more of big plans for the future of the firm. Later Pierce and Roman go to meet a new client arrested for murder. Before the meeting, Pierce resumes the conversation from the game, saying that Jackson's and Roman's dedication to justice has touched him. Pierce sketches out an approach at the firm to reflect that, and offers to work with Roman on his brief.

Roman, still despondent, is unmoved by these developments. They go in to see the client, who turns out to be Johnson, the shooter in the Ellerbee case. Meeting Roman in jail, Johnson accuses him of divulging privileged communications to collect the reward money and resolves to torment Roman with the threat of jail time or death. Roman approaches a mental breakdown as he comes to recognize his own actions as unlawful. He receives mysterious phone calls and hang-ups at work and considers fleeing town. A colleague at the law firm tells Roman he knows Israel illegally collected the Ellerbee/Johnson reward.

Renouncing his transgressions, and having returned the reward money with a note he'd written, apologizing for taking it in the first place, Roman reconciles with Maya and Pierce, and tries to motivate them to pursue justice. He tells Pierce he's turning himself in to the police for his crime. As Roman starts walking to a nearby police station, he is shot and killed by one of Johnson's henchmen. In the aftermath, Maya is seen to be renewed in her activism, while Pierce files Roman's brief, in both their names, continuing their efforts to reform the justice system.

== Cast ==
- Denzel Washington as Roman J. Israel
- Colin Farrell as George Pierce
- Carmen Ejogo as Maya Alston
- Shelley Hennig as Olivia Reed
- Lynda Gravatt as Vernita Wells
- Amanda Warren as Lynn Jackson (niece)
- Hugo Armstrong as Fritz Molinar
- Sam Gilroy as Connor Novick
- Tony Plana as Jesse Salinas
- DeRon Horton as Derrell Ellerbee
- Amari Cheatom as Carter Johnson
- Nazneen Contractor as Assistant D.A. Melina Nassour
- Joseph David-Jones as Marcus Jones
- Henry G. Sanders as Pastor Jack
- Andrew Tinpo Lee as James Lee

== Production ==
=== Development ===
On August 25, 2016, Dan Gilroy's next directorial project was revealed to be Inner City, a legal drama in the vein of The Verdict. Gilroy was then courting Denzel Washington to star. Sony Pictures reportedly was closing a deal to distribute the film, with principal photography scheduled to begin in March 2017. Gilroy's collaborators on Nightcrawler, cinematographer Robert Elswit and editor John Gilroy, worked with him again on the project. On January 31, 2017, a report stated that Colin Farrell was in talks to join the cast. As of February 28, 2017, Ashton Sanders was in talks to join as well, though he was unable to because of scheduling conflicts. In April 2017, Nazneen Contractor and Joseph David-Jones joined the cast. As of April 21, 2017, Inner City had begun filming in Los Angeles. In June 2017, Carmen Ejogo joined the cast as a civil rights worker. On June 22, 2017, the film was renamed Roman J. Israel, Esq.

=== Music ===
James Newton Howard composed the film's music, as he previously worked with Gilroy on Nightcrawler. The score was released by Sony Classical.

==== Track listing ====
| No. | Title | Length |
|---|---|---|
| 1. | "Supreme Court of Absolute Universal Law" | 1:44 |
| 2. | "Just Continuances" | 1:35 |
| 3. | "Roman Walks Home" | 1:49 |
| 4. | "George Pierce Offices" | 2:12 |
| 5. | "Nonprofit Talks" | 3:36 |
| 6. | "The Brief" | 1:47 |
| 7. | "Maple Glazed Donut" | 3:03 |
| 8. | "The Drop" | 2:04 |
| 9. | "The Real Enemy Within" | 2:59 |
| 10. | "Roman's Judgment" | 3:26 |
| 11. | "It's All in the Rearview Mirror" | 2:11 |
| 12. | "To Make the Call" | 3:11 |
| 13. | "Are You Okay Mister?" | 2:51 |
| 14. | "Guard! Guard!" | 2:03 |
| 15. | "Filing the Brief" | 5:37 |
| Total length: | | 40:08 |

== Release ==
The film had its world premiere at the Toronto International Film Festival on September 10, 2017, before its commercial release on November 17, 2017, initially limited, by Sony Pictures Releasing. Following its festival premiere, the film was re-edited to tighten its pacing, with a dozen minutes (including one whole subplot) being shaved off the final runtime, and a key scene regarding Colin Farrell's character being shifted from the third act to earlier in the film.

== Reception ==
=== Box office ===
Roman J. Israel, Esq. grossed $12 million in the United States and Canada, and $1.1 million in other territories, for a worldwide total of $13 million.

In the United States and Canada, Roman J. Israel, Esq. was released alongside Justice League, The Star, and Wonder on November 17, 2017. The film grossed $61,999 from four theaters in its limited opening weekend, for a per-venue average of $15,500. It then expanded to 1,648 theaters the following Wednesday, alongside the openings of Coco and The Man Who Invented Christmas. It went on to gross at $4.5 million over the three-day weekend (and $6.2 million over the five), finishing 9th at the box office. It fell 57% in its second weekend to $1.9 million.

=== Critical response ===
On Rotten Tomatoes, the film has an approval rating of 55% based on 174 reviews. The website's critical consensus reads, "Intriguing yet heavy-handed, Roman J. Israel, Esq. makes the most of — but never quite lives up to — Denzel Washington's magnetic performance in the title role." On Metacritic, which assigns a normalized rating to reviews, the film has a weighted average score 58 out of 100, based 41 critics, indicating "mixed or average reviews". Audiences polled by CinemaScore gave the film an average grade of "B" on an A+ to F scale.

Writing for Rolling Stone, Peter Travers gave the film 3 out of 4 stars, praising Washington and writing, "In no way is his performance a stunt. Washington digs so deep under the skin of this complex character that we almost breathe with him. It's a great, award-caliber performance in a movie that can barely contain it." Richard Roeper of the Chicago Sun-Times gave the film 2 out of 4 stars. He also highlighted Washington, but criticized the narrative, saying, "Roman J. Israel, Esq. has pockets of intrigue, and writer-director Gilroy and Washington have teamed up to create a promising dramatic character. We just never get full delivery on that promise."

In his review for Empire, Simon Braund summarized the political motives in the film viewed as a legal thriller stating, "It illustrates succinctly how at odds with the modern world Roman Israel is. A brilliant legal mind, trapped in the body of a twitchy social misfit, he has all the hallmarks of a true genius-savant — the interpersonal skills of a yeast cell, dress sense of an Open University lecturer circa 1973 and an unshakeable conviction that justice for the poor and dispossessed is a cause worth fighting for. To this deeply unfashionable end, he's spent decades toiling in the shadows at a tiny law firm, making trouble for The Man while compiling a vast, unwieldy brief he hopes will, one day, set the American legal system on its ear." Owen Gleiberman of Variety wrote, "It leaves us with a character you won't soon forget, but you wish that the movie were as haunting as he is."

=== Accolades ===
| Award | Date of ceremony | Category | Recipients | Result | Ref. |
|---|---|---|---|---|---|
| Academy Awards | March 4, 2018 | Best Actor | Denzel Washington | Nominated | |
| Golden Globe Awards | January 7, 2018 | Best Actor in a Motion Picture – Drama | Denzel Washington | Nominated | |
| Screen Actors Guild Awards | January 21, 2018 | Outstanding Performance by a Male Actor in a Leading Role | Denzel Washington | Nominated | |
| NAACP Image Awards | January 15, 2018 | Outstanding Actor in a Motion Picture | Denzel Washington | Nominated | |
| Black Reel Awards | February 23, 2018 | Best Actor | Denzel Washington | Nominated | |
