= Out of Time (2003 film) =

2003 film by Carl Franklin

- Theatrical release poster
- Directed by: Carl Franklin
- Written by: David Collard
- Produced by: Jesse Beaton; Damien Saccani; Neal H. Moritz
- Starring: Denzel Washington; Eva Mendes; Sanaa Lathan; Dean Cain
- Cinematography: Theo van de Sande
- Edited by: Carole Kravetz
- Music by: Graeme Revell
- Production companies: Metro-Goldwyn-Mayer; Original Film; Monarch Pictures
- Distributed by: MGM Distribution Co.
- Release date: October 3, 2003
- Running time: 105 minutes
- Country: United States
- Language: English
- Budget: $50 million
- Box office: $55.5 million

Out of Time is a 2003 American neo-noir crime thriller film directed by Carl Franklin and starring Denzel Washington. The two had previously worked together for the 1995 film Devil in a Blue Dress.

The film was released in the United States on October 3, 2003, and received positive reviews from critics.

== Plot ==
Matt Lee Whitlock is the respected chief of police in the small Florida Keys town of Banyan Key. Recently separated, Matt is currently seeing local resident Ann Merai-Harrison, an old flame from high school whose husband Chris, a former professional quarterback seemingly oblivious to the relationship, abuses her. While taking Ann to the doctor, Matt finds out she has been diagnosed with terminal cancer. Matt is also going through a divorce from his wife, homicide detective Alex, and is friends with medical examiner Chae.

Ann intends to reward Matt's loyalty by making him the sole beneficiary of her $1,000,000 life insurance policy. Matt suggests that she should travel to Switzerland to undergo a newly developed, groundbreaking treatment, but Ann is unable to afford it. Desperate to help, Matt takes $485,000 out of evidence from a drug bust and gives it to Ann so she can make the trip. When the money goes up in flames in a suspicious house fire that kills Ann and Chris, Matt is horrified to find their charred remains. Upon investigation, Matt discovers that the doctor that diagnosed Ann was an imposter, Ann didn't have cancer, and he has been set up.

When DEA agents call the next day to get the evidence money in order to bust a drug kingpin, Matt responds erratically. He finds out the money is now with the imposter and that Alex is about to bust him. He rushes to the hotel and, after a brief struggle, accidentally kills the imposter, takes the money and flees. Although Matt is seen by the police, he is thought to have come to protect Alex.

Later that evening, Alex finds that Matt is Ann's sole beneficiary and also that he has been in a relationship with her. At the same time, Matt receives a distress call from Ann, who is still alive, and unofficially goes to save her. Chris and Matt fight, during which Ann shoots and kills Chris. Ann then reveals that she had planned the recent events for money and fortune, and shoots Matt in the leg.

Just as Ann is about to kill Matt, Alex kills her; Alex traced Matt using a GPS tracker and asks whether he planned to elope with the money, but Matt reveals that he has not brought the money with him. When the irritated DEA agents come to arrest Matt, he says that his man was sent to Miami. Chae appears with the money, explaining that bad information led him to the wrong address. The DEA agents leave with the money and Matt has no charges brought against him.

Later, when Matt is on medical leave, Chae visits him with news that Matt is the recipient of Ann's insurance policy. But Alex says that "as his wife," she knows that Matt has to reject it, meaning that she has decided to drop the divorce and move back in with Matt. Overjoyed, Matt seemingly forgets about the money, though Chae is amusingly adamant that Matt must take it.

== Cast ==
- Denzel Washington as Mathias “Matt” Lee Whitlock
- Eva Mendes as Alex Diaz-Whitlock
- Sanaa Lathan as Ann Merai-Harrison
- Dean Cain as Chris Harrison
- John Billingsley as Chae
- Robert Baker as Tony Dalton
- Alex Carter as Paul Cabot, the imposter doctor
- Antoni Corone as Officer Baste
- Terry Loughlin as Agent Stark
- Nora Dunn as Dr. Donovan
- James Murtaugh as Dr. Frieland
- O. L. Duke as Detective Bronze

== Awards ==
2004 Black Reel Awards

- Won: Best Theatrical Film
- Nominated: Best Actor, Denzel Washington
- Won: Best Actress, Sanaa Lathan
- Nominated: Best Director, Carl Franklin

2004 Image Awards

- Nominated: Outstanding Actor in a Motion Picture, Denzel Washington
- Nominated: Outstanding Supporting Actress in a Motion Picture, Sanaa Lathan

== Reception ==
On Rotten Tomatoes, the film has a score of 65% based on 150 reviews, with an average rating of 6.3 out of 10. The critical consensus states the film is a "fun and stylish thriller if you can get past the contrivances." On Metacritic, it has a score of 63% based on reviews from 35 critics, indicating "generally favorable reviews".

Several reviews praised the film's performances and genre craftsmanship, particularly Denzel Washington’s lead turn and the film’s neo-noir atmosphere. Roger Ebert wrote that the plot “cheerfully piles on the contrivances,” but argued that, for a thriller, the key pleasure is “a sense of style brought to genre material,” also highlighting the Florida setting as an asset. Ed Gonzalez of Slant Magazine described the film as an “easy-breezy” thriller that “works hard to make the audience part of its con,” though he ultimately characterized it as disposable entertainment.

Other critics were more negative about its plausibility. Screen Daily called it "not merely implausible, it is preposterous."

The film received recognition from the Black Reel Awards, winning Best Film, with Sanaa Lathan also winning Best Actress.

== Video game ==
WAP and Java mobile phone games based upon this movie were released in the UK in association with O2 and Momentum Pictures by Kalador Entertainment Inc.

== Home media ==
Out of Time was released on VHS and DVD by MGM Home Entertainment on January 6, 2004, in widescreen-only for DVD & full screen for VHS.

== Remake ==
The film was remade in India as Zeher and released in 2005.
