= Courage Under Fire =

1996 film by Edward Zwick

- Theatrical release poster
- Directed by: Edward Zwick
- Written by: Patrick Sheane Duncan
- Produced by: John Davis; Joseph M. Singer; David T. Friendly
- Starring: Denzel Washington; Meg Ryan; Lou Diamond Phillips; Michael Moriarty; Matt Damon; Seth Gilliam; Bronson Pinchot; Scott Glenn
- Cinematography: Roger Deakins
- Edited by: Steven Rosenblum
- Music by: James Horner
- Production companies: Davis Entertainment; Joseph M. Singer Entertainment; Friendly Films; Fox 2000 Pictures
- Distributed by: 20th Century Fox
- Release date: July 12, 1996
- Running time: 116 minutes
- Language: English
- Budget: $46 million
- Box office: $100.9 million

Courage Under Fire is a 1996 American war drama film directed by Edward Zwick, and starring Denzel Washington and Meg Ryan. It is the second collaboration between Washington and director Zwick.

The film was released by 20th Century Fox in the United States on July 12, 1996, to positive reviews and grossed $100 million worldwide. It was also the first movie to be produced by Fox 2000 Pictures two years after the company was established in 1994.

== Plot ==
Lieutenant Colonel Nathaniel Serling's M-1 Abrams fires on and destroys an American tank during a confusing nighttime battle in the Persian Gulf War, killing his friend Lieutenant Tom Boylar. The United States Army covers up the friendly fire incident, awards Serling a Silver Star, and transfers him to a desk job.

Serling's new duties include determining if Captain Karen Walden should become the first woman to receive the Medal of Honor. As the commander of a Medevac Huey helicopter sent to rescue the crew of a shot-down Black Hawk helicopter, Walden's crew destroyed an enemy T-54 tank with a fuel bladder and flare gun before being shot down. The two downed crews were unable to join forces, and when the survivors were rescued, Walden was reported dead.

Serling notices inconsistencies in the award testimonies of Walden's crew. Specialist Andrew Ilario, the medic, praises Walden strongly. Staff Sergeant John Monfriez claims that Walden was a coward, and that it was he who led the crew in combat and improvised the fuel bladder weapon. Sergeant Steven Altameyer dying of cancer in a hospital, complains about a fire in one of his few coherent comments. Warrant Officer Rady, the co-pilot, was unconscious from injuries throughout the ordeal. The crew of the other helicopter claim report they heard an M16 rifle firing, but Ilario and Monfriez claim it was out of ammo.

The White House and Serling's commander pressure him to finalize the investigation quickly. Feeling guilty about the covered up friendly fire incident, Serling leaks word of an audio recording of radio transmissions during the attack to newspaper reporter Tony Gartner. When Serling grills Monfriez about his inconsistent account, Monfriez forces him out of his car and drives into an oncoming train. Ilario finally tells Serling the truth. Monfriez wanted to abandon the wounded co-pilot and flee the enemy forces trying to capture the downed helicopters. Walden refused and Monfriez threatened her at gunpoint. Walden threatened him with a court-martial for mutiny and ordered that he surrender his weapons. During the stand-off, Walden shot an enemy soldier suddenly appearing behind Monfriez, who assumed Walden was firing at him. Monfriez shot her in the stomach before realizing his mistake.

The enemy attacked in force the next morning, as a rescue party approached. Walden stayed behind and fired an M-16 to cover her crew's withdrawal to the rescue force. Monfriez told the rescuers Walden was dead, and they left without her. Napalm was dropped over the area to destroy the helicopters and enemy forces. Altameyer was too injured to expose Monfriez's lie and Ilario feared court-martial. Serling's final report endorses the award and Walden's young daughter receives the Medal of Honor at a White House ceremony. Serling finally confronts the Boylars about the truth of their son's death and they forgive him. Serling flashes back to standing by Boylar's destroyed tank. A medevac Huey lifts off with his friend's body and he sees Walden is the pilot.

== Cast ==
- Denzel Washington as Lieutenant Colonel Nat Serling
- Meg Ryan as Captain Karen Walden
- Lou Diamond Phillips as Staff Sergeant Monfriez
- Michael Moriarty as Brigadier General Hershberg
- Matt Damon as Specialist Ilario
- Bronson Pinchot as Bruno, a White House aide
- Seth Gilliam as Sergeant Altameyer
- Regina Taylor as Meredith Serling
- Željko Ivanek as Captain Banacek
- Scott Glenn as Gartner, a Washington Post reporter and Vietnam veteran

== Production ==
The Pentagon denied a request for access to military equipment for filming. Philip M. Strub, for the Pentagon, said of the film characters that "there wasn't a good soldier among them". Lacking such access, the filmmakers had to source equipment elsewhere, including having former Australian Army Centurion tanks modified to resemble the M1 Abrams depicted in the production.

== Reception ==
=== Box office ===
- U.S. domestic gross: US$ 59,031,057
- International: $41,829,761
- Worldwide gross: $100,860,818

The film opened #3 at the box office behind Independence Day and Phenomenon.

=== Critical response ===
The film received mostly positive reviews. As of June 15, 2022, the review aggregator website Rotten Tomatoes reported that 86% of critics gave the film a positive review based upon a sample of 56 reviews with an average rating of 7.3/10. The critical consensus states that the film is "an emotional and intriguing tale of a military officer who must review the merits of a slain officer while confronting his own war demons. Effectively depicts the terrors of war as well as its heartbreaking aftermath." At the website Metacritic, which uses a weighted average rating system, the film earned a generally favorable rating of 77/100 based on 19 mainstream critic reviews. Audiences polled by CinemaScore gave the film an average grade of "A" on an A+ to F scale.

The movie was commended by several critics. James Berardinelli of the website ReelViews wrote that the film was, "As profound and intelligent as it is moving, and that makes this memorable motion picture one of 1996's best." Roger Ebert of the Chicago Sun-Times spoke positively of the film saying that while the ending "lays on the emotion a little heavily" the movie had been up until that point "a fascinating emotional and logistical puzzle—almost a courtroom movie, with the desert as the courtroom."

Denzel Washington's acting was specifically lauded, as Peter Travers of Rolling Stone wrote, "In Washington's haunted eyes, in the stunning cinematography of Roger Deakins (Fargo) that plunges into the mad flare of combat, in the plot that deftly turns a whodunit into a meditation on character and in Zwick's persistent questioning of authority, Courage Under Fire honors its subject and its audience." Additionally Peter Stack of the San Francisco Chronicle wrote that "Denzel Washington is riveting."

Matt Damon, on his way to stardom but not there yet, said he lost 40 pounds for his role despite only being scheduled for two days of shooting opposite Washington. When critics and reporters rarely mentioned his appearance in the film, Damon said he contemplated suicide for feeling so overlooked, even though A-List Steven Spielberg would later compliment Damon for his performance and cast him as the titular character in the war epic Saving Private Ryan. After getting medicated, his mental health improved, along with his career recognition and prospects.

In retrospect, Meg Ryan cited Courage Under Fire among her favorite acting experiences, stating, "I love dramatic pieces like Courage Under Fire. That was really fun with all those guys, guns and helicopters."

In 2025, The Hollywood Reporter listed Courage Under Fire as having the best stunts of 1996.

== Historical context ==
The Medal of Honor was awarded to Mary Edwards Walker, an American Civil War physician, but not for valor in combat. Her name was deleted from the Army Medal of Honor Roll in 1917 (along with over 900 other recipients); however, it was restored in 1977.
