= The Piano Lesson (soundtrack) =

The Piano Lesson (Soundtrack from the Netflix Film)

Film score by Alexandre Desplat
- Released: November 15, 2024
- Recorded: 2023–2024
- Genre: Film score
- Length: 55:10
- Label: Netflix Music
- Producer: Alexandre Desplat

Alexandre Desplat chronology
The Most Precious of Cargoes (2024)	The Piano Lesson (2024)	Unstoppable (2024)

The Piano Lesson (Soundtrack from the Netflix Film) is the soundtrack album to the 2024 film The Piano Lesson directed by Malcolm Washington, and featuring an ensemble cast of Samuel L. Jackson, John David Washington, Ray Fisher, Michael Potts, Erykah Badu, Skylar Aleece Smith, Danielle Deadwyler, and Corey Hawkins.

The film score is composed by Alexandre Desplat and was released through Netflix Music on November 15, 2024.

== Development ==
In July 2024, it was announced Alexandre Desplat would compose the original score for The Piano Lesson. According to director Malcolm Washington, the film had "a big Americana, pastoral element" and was curious what Desplat's take on it would be. Desplat, who had a passion for jazz and Afro-American musical traditions, was excited by the opportunity to work on the film.

Taking inspiration from Duke Ellington's orchestral sound in the late-1930s and early-1940s, Desplat envisioned the use of high clarinet, muted trombones and piano would "take the audience back to that era without playing jazz". The score had no drums, as Desplat did not go for a big-band score and instead opted for a more intimate sound; the main theme was described as melancholic and "bluesy".

Initially, Desplat and Washington decided against the use of piano, due to its role in the film's climax, but changed their mind after Desplat played out a bassline on the instrument; the piano is mostly used non-melodically in the score, and Desplat avoided using it for scenes set within the house. The score also complimented monologues punctuating scene transitions and montages. Desplat admired on Washington's talent to expand the supernatural segment of the story which resulted to craft a "spectrum of emotions" for the score.

== Reception ==
David Rooney of The Hollywood Reporter wrote "Alexandre Desplat’s thundering score highlights the stakes of [the] verbal tussles." Robert Daniels of Screen International called it a "squeaking, swirling score". Caleb Hammond of IndieWire wrote "Alexandre Desplat’s score is expectedly lush, if not a little overbearing in spots, often working with the sound design to allude to the film’s supernatural elements ahead of them taking center stage later." Moira MacDonald of The Seattle Times called the score "eclectic" but also "intrusive" due to its repetitiveness. Nick Schager of The Daily Beast wrote "Alexandre Desplat's mournful score is attuned to these individuals' pain and longing". Pete Hammond of Deadline Hollywood wrote, "Alexandre Desplat has also provided a rich and appropriate score that works splendidly", while Tara Bennett of Paste called the score "restrained".

== Track listing ==
No.	Title	Length
1.	"The Piano Lesson"	3:54
2.	"The Truck"	2:54
3.	"Selling Watermelons"	2:28
4.	"Pittsburgh"	1:51
5.	"Berniece Story"	2:30
6.	"The Plantation"	5:30
7.	"Avery's Blessing"	3:25
8.	"Boy Willie"	3:57
9.	"Piano Reverie"	6:16
10.	"The Piano Story"	1:42
11.	"Black and White Keys"	2:00
12.	"Ghost"	2:56
13.	"Help Me"	7:38
14.	"Lymon Flirts"	1:54
15.	"Ancestors"	2:32
16.	"Fight Over Piano"	3:43
Total length:		55:10
