= The Piano Lesson (disambiguation) =

The Piano Lesson is a 1987 play by August Wilson.

The Piano Lesson may also refer to:

- The Piano Lesson (1995 film), a 1995 television film
- The Piano Lesson (2024 film), a 2024 drama film
