= Katia Washington =

American film producer (born 1987)

- Born: November 27, 1987 (age 38); Los Angeles, California, U.S.
- Education: Yale University (BA)
- Occupation: Film producer
- Years active: 2016–present
- Spouse: Colleen Wilson
- Parent(s): Denzel Washington (father); Pauletta Washington (mother)
- Relatives: John David Washington (brother); Olivia Washington (sister); Malcolm Washington (brother)

Katia Washington (born November 27, 1987) is an American film producer. She was an executive producer on the 2024 film The Piano Lesson.

== Personal life ==
Washington was born on November 27, 1986 in Los Angeles to Pauletta (née Pearson) and Denzel Washington; she is the sister of John David Washington, Malcolm Washington and Olivia Washington.

She studied at Yale University from 2006 to 2010, where she earned a bachelor's degree in history.

She is married to ballerina Colleen Wilson.

== Filmography as producer ==
- Fences (2016; associate producer)
- Assassination Nation (2018; co-producer)
- Pieces of a Woman (2020; co-executive producer)
- Malcolm & Marie (2021; co-executive producer)
- Breaking (2021; executive producer)
- Sharp Stick (2022; producer)
- The Piano Lesson (2024; executive producer)
- Highest 2 Lowest (2025; executive producer)
