= 60th Chicago International Film Festival =

2024 edition of film festival

- Official poster.
- Opening film: The Piano Lesson
- Closing film: Here
- Location: Chicago, United States
- Founded: 1964
- Festival date: October 16–27, 2024
- Website: www.chicagofilmfestival.com

Chicago International Film Festival
- 2025 2023

The 60th Chicago International Film Festival took place from October 16 to 27, 2024, in Chicago, United States. Malcolm Washington's directorial debut The Piano Lesson, adapted from August Wilson's 1987 play, served as the "Opening Night Film", while Robert Zemeckis' drama film Here, an adaptation of the graphic novel by Richard McGuire, was selected as the "Closing Night Film".

Festival events took place mainly around AMC NEWCITY 14, though other event venues throughout the city included the Music Box Theatre, the Gene Siskel Film Center, the Chicago History Museum, and the Reva and David Logan Center for the Arts at the University of Chicago.

== Background ==
American director Malcolm Washington received the Breakthrough Award for his debut The Piano Lesson. Additionally, actor John David Washington, who stars in the film, received the Spotlight Award. Robert Zemeckis received the Founder's Legacy Award, which was presented during the Closing Night celebration. American director Marielle Heller received the Visionary Award for her comedy horror film Nightbitch, which was selected as the "Centerpiece Film".

Japanese director Hirokazu Kore-eda received the Career Achievement Award, with a retrospective program presented on October 18, dedicated to honor his filmography. American actor Mike Myers also received the Career Achievement Award, presented on October 19 during a special event titled "An Evening with Mike Myers" hosted by Dave Foley.

== Official Selection ==
The films selected for each section are as follows:

=== Special Presentations ===
English Title	Original Title	Director(s)	Production countrie(s)
Opening Night
The Piano Lesson		Malcolm Washington	United States
Centerpiece
Nightbitch		Marielle Heller	United States
Closing Night
Here		Robert Zemeckis	United States, United Kingdom
Special Presentations
Better Man		Michael Gracey	Australia
Blitz		Steve McQueen	United Kingdom
Conclave		Edward Berger	United States, United Kingdom
Maria		Pablo Larraín	Italy, Germany, United States
A Real Pain		Jesse Eisenberg	United States, Poland
The Room Next Door		Pedro Almodóvar	Spain
September 5		Tim Fehlbaum	Germany

=== International Competition ===
The following films compete for the Gold Hugo of the International Feature Film Competition:

English Title	Original Title	Director(s)	Production countrie(s)
All We Imagine as Light	ഭയായ് നിനച്ചതെല്ലാം	Payal Kapadia	France, India, Netherlands, Luxembourg
The End		Joshua Oppenheimer	Ireland, Germany, Sweden, Denmark, Italy, United Kingdom
Grand Tour		Miguel Gomes	Portugal, Italy, France, Germany, Japan, China
Harvest		Athina Rachel Tsangari	United Kingdom, Germany, Greece, France, United States
On Becoming a Guinea Fowl		Rungano Nyoni	Zambia, United Kingdom, Ireland
The Quiet Son	Jouer avec le feu	Delphine Coulin, Muriel Coulin	France
The Seed of the Sacred Fig	دانه‌ی انجیر معابد / Les Graines du figuier sauvage / Die Saat des heiligen Feigenbaums	Mohammad Rasoulof	Germany, Iran, France
The Sparrow in the Chimney	Der Spatz im Kamin	Ramon Zürcher	Switzerland
Suçuarana		Clarissa Campolina, Sérgio Borges	Brazil
Super Happy Forever		Kohei Igarashi	France, Japan
Transamazonia		Pia Marais	France, Germany, Switzerland, Taiwan, Brazil
Vermiglio		Maura Delpero	Italy, France, Belgium
When the Light Breaks	Ljósbrot	Rúnar Rúnarsson	Iceland, Netherlands, Croatia, France

=== New Directors ===
The following films compete for the Gold Hugo of the New Directors section:

English Title	Original Title	Director(s)	Production countrie(s)
Cabo Negro (Note: Nominated for the Q Hugo Award)		Abdellah Taïa	France, Morocco
Ghost Trail	Les Fantômes	Jonathan Millet	France, Germany, Belgium
Hanami		Denise Fernandes	Switzerland, Portugal, Cape Verde
Happy Holidays	ينعاد عليكو	Scandar Copti	Palestine, Germany, France, Italy, Qatar
Listen to the Voices	Kouté vwa	Maxime Jean-Baptiste	Belgium, France, French Guiana
My Favourite Cake	کیک محبوب من	Maryam Moqadam, Behtash Sanaeeha	Iran, France, Sweden, Germany
Peacock		Bernhard Wenger	Austria, Germany
Rita		Paz Vega	Spain
Toxic	Akiplėša	Saulė Bliuvaitė	Lithuania
Transplant		Jason Park	United States
The Village Next to Paradise		Mo Harawe	Austria, France, Germany, Somalia
Who Do I Belong To	ماء العين / Là d'où l'on vient	Meryam Joobeur	Tunisia, France, Canada

=== International Documentary Competition ===
The following films compete for the Gold Hugo of the International Documentary Competition:

English Title	Original Title	Director(s)	Production countrie(s)
Apocalypse in the Tropics	Apocalipse nos Trópicos	Petra Costa	Brazil, United States, Denmark
Between Goodbyes		Jota Mun	United States
The Brink of Dreams		Nada Riyadh Ayman El Amir	Egypt, France, Denmark, Qatar, Saudi Arabia
Dahomey		Mati Diop	France, Senegal, Benin
Desire Lines (Note: Nominated for the Chicago Award)		Jules Rosskam	United States
Ernest Cole: Lost and Found		Raoul Peck	France
The Last Republican		Steve Pink	United States
Life and Other Problems	Livet og andre problemer	Max Kestner	Denmark, United Kingdom, Sweden
The Light of Truth: Richard Hunt's Monument to Ida B. Wells		Rana Segal	United States
Mistress Dispeller		Elizabeth Lo	China, United States
My Stolen Planet	Sayyareye dozdide shodeye man	Farahnaz Sharifi	Germany, Iran
No Other Land		Basel Adra, Hamdan Ballal, Yuval Abraham, Rachel Szor	Palestine, Norway
Once Upon a Time in Forest	Havumetsän lapset	Virpi Suutari	Finland
Pavements		Alex Ross Perry	United States
A Photographic Memory		Rachel Elizabeth Seed	United States
The Return of the Projectionist	Le Retour du projectionniste	Orkhan Aghazadeh	France, Germany
Save the Children (1973)		Stan Lathan	United States
Separated		Errol Morris	United States, Mexico
Slice of Life: The American Dream. In Former Pizza Huts.		Matthew Salleh	United States
Time Passages		Kyle Henry	United States
Wellness Warrior		Chaz Ebert	United States
Wishing on a Star		Péter Kerekes	Italy, Slovakia, Czech Republic, Austria, Croatia
Zurawski v Texas		Maisie Crow, Abbie Perrault	United States, United Kingdom

=== Spotlight ===
English Title	Original Title	Director(s)	Production countrie(s)
The Art of Joy	L'arte della gioia	Valeria Golino	Italy, United Kingdom
Bird		Andrea Arnold	United Kingdom, France
The Brutalist		Brady Corbet	United Kingdom
By the Stream	수유천	Hong Sang-soo	South Korea
Caught by the Tides	风流一代	Jia Zhangke	China
Emilia Pérez		Jacques Audiard	France
The Girl with the Needle	Pigen med nålen	Magnus von Horn	Denmark, Poland, Sweden
Hard Truths		Mike Leigh	United Kingdom, Spain
I'm Still Here	Ainda Estou Aqui	Walter Salles	Brazil, France
It's Not Me	Cést pas moi	Leos Carax	France
La cocina		Alonso Ruizpalacios	United States, Mexico
Misericordia	Miséricorde	Alain Guiraudie	France
Nickel Boys		RaMell Ross	United States
The Return		Uberto Pasolini	Italy, United Kingdom
Sicilian Letters	Iddu	Fabio Grassadonia, Antonio Piazza	Italy, France
Small Things Like These		Tim Mielants	Ireland, Belgium
Unstoppable		William Goldenberg	United States

=== Snapshots ===
English Title	Original Title	Director(s)	Production countrie(s)
Alberta Number One		Alexander Carson	Canada
Alpha.		Jan-Willem van Ewijk	Netherlands, Slovenia, Switzerland
Armand		Halfdan Ullmann Tøndel	Norway, Netherlands, Germany, Sweden
The Ballad of Suzanne Césaire		Madeleine Hunt-Ehrlich	United States
Bliss	Hemda	Shemi Zarhin	Israel
Color Book		David Fortune	United States
Eephus		Carson Lund	United States, France
Faruk		Aslı Özge	Germany, Turkey, France
Flow	Straume	Gints Zilbalodis	Latvia, France, Belgium
The Kingdom	Le Royaume	Julien Colonna	France
The Knife		Nnamdi Asomugha	United States
Memoir of a Snail		Adam Elliot	Australia
Okie		Kate Cobb	United States
The Other Way Around	Volveréis	Jonás Trueba	Spain, France
Pepe		Nelson Carlo De Los Santos Arias	Dominican Republic, Namibia, Germany, France
Santosh		Sandhya Suri	United Kingdom
The Time It Takes	Il tempo che ci vuole	Francesca Comencini	Italy, France
To a Land Unknown		Mahdi Fleifel	United Kingdom, Palestine, France, Greece, Netherlands, Germany, Qatar, Saudi Arabia
Turning Tables	Klandestin	Angelina Maccarone	Germany
We Were Dangerous		Josephine Stewart-Te Whiu	New Zealand

=== Outlook ===
The following films compete for the Q Hugo Awards, for films with LGBTQ+ themes, some films competing for the award appear in other sections and are already listed in previous tables:

English Title	Original Title	Director(s)	Production countrie(s)
Baby		Marcelo Caetano	Brazil, France, Netherlands
Four Mothers		Darren Thornton	Ireland
My Sunshine	ぼくのお日さま	Hiroshi Okuyama	Japan, France
Thesis on a Domestication	Tesis sobre una domesticación	Javier Van de Couter	Argentina, Mexico
Three Kilometres to the End of the World	Trei kilometri până la capătul lumii	Emanuel Pârvu	Romania
Viet and Nam	Trong lòng đất	Minh Quý Trương	Vietnam

=== Shorts ===
The following short films compete for the Gold Hugo of the Shorts Competition:

English Title	Original Title	Director(s)	Production countrie(s)
Animated Short Films
Alone		Alex Weight	Australia
Artist on the Go!		Nathan William Frost	United States
As the Sun Goes Down		Laurine Bocquet, Ilona Caucal, Inès Fechner, Jahnice Laurent, Sarah Robert, Emma Roussel, Kevin Vandenbeuck	France
Butterfly Kiss		Zohar Dvir	Germany, Israel
Dona Beatriz Ñsîmba Vita		Catapreta	Brazil
Have I Swalowed Your Dreams		Clara Chan	Canada
Hoofs on Skates		Ignas Meilūnas	Lithuania
Mû		Malin Neumann	Germany
On Hold		Delia Hess	Switzerland
Plunge		Ellie Land	United Kingdom
Reunion		Shiqi Xiao	China
She and Her Good Vibration		Olivia Griselda, Sarah Cheok	Singapore
Shellish	Coquille	Justine Aubert, Cassandra Bouton, Grégoire Callies, Maud Chesneau, Anna Danton, Loic Girault, Gatien Peyrude, Justine Raux	France
So Long Memories		Ruihan Zhang, Wenzi Shan, Xingyi Chen	China
Super High: A Period Piece		Bianca Lambert	United States
The Painting	Le tableau	Michèle Lemieux	Canada
This World Is a Soda Can We Are Shaking It		Sera Mun	South Korea
Trigonometry’s Ultimate Method to Putting the Fun Back in Your Own Funeral		April Aquino	United States
Wander to Wonder		Nina Gantz	Netherlands, Belgium, France, United Kingdom
Yuck!	Beurk!	Loïc Espuche	France
Live-Action Short Films
About Time		Donald Conley	United States
Addiction		Tzuhsuan Peng	Taiwan
Alone with You	Lewahdena	Tara Shehata	Egypt
Black Shadow	Negra sombra	María Salafranca	Cuba
Blind Sighted		Mitch Davila Armendano	United States
Body of Christ	Mi primera comunión	Ángel Villahermosa	Spain
Broken Flight		Erika Valenciana, Mitchell Wenkus	United States
Chhaya		Sophiyaa Nayar	United States
Chomp		Suki-Rose, Crickett Arrison	United States
Dadá	Dependências	Luisa Arraes	Brazil
Dark Matter		Leo Berkeley	Australia
Day with a Dick		Kimberly Spohn	United States
Estranged Letter		Assia Boundaoui	United States
Faces		Blake Simon	United States
Fishbowl		Isabel Perry, Adam Yates	United States
Free Lunch		Samuel Laine	United States
Go in Peace	Al nan la paix	Jean Gaspa	France
Grace		Natalie Jasmine Harris	United States
Hazel (Dual)		Kevin Jerome Everson	United States
Hpneymoon		Alkis Papastathopoulos	Greece, France, Cyprus
I Can No Longer See		Raine Yung	United States
I Was There, Part II		Chi Jang Yin	United States, Japan
If the Sun Drowned Into an Ocean of Clouds	Et si le soleil plongeait dans l'océan des nues	Wissam Charaf	France, Lebanon
Kombucha!		Jake Myers	United States
Lana		Laetitia Angba, Julie Redon Lissouba	Canada
Lumen		Stéphanie Bélanger	Canada
Motorcycle Mary		Haley Watson	United States
My Senses Are All I Have to Offer	As minhas sensações são tudo o que tenho para oferecer	Isadora Neves Marques	Portugal
O		Rúnar Rúnarsson	Iceland, Sweden
Passarinho		Natalia García Agraz	Mexico
perfectly a strangeness		Alison McAlpine	Canada, Chile
Resonancia		James Choi	Mexico
Saving Superman		Adam Oppenheim, Samuel-Ali Mirpoorian	United States
She Stays	Ella se queda	Marinthia Gutiérrez	Mexico
Song of Love and Hate		Saurav Ghimire	Nepal, Belgium
Space Coast		Caroline Bates	United States
Space Plug		Marcus Anthony Thomas	United Kingdom
Stero		Tevin Kimathi, Millan Tarus	Kenya
Teen Girl Fantasy		Marisa Hoicka	Canada
Terminally III		Chris Cole	United States
The Damp Season		Olivia Huilin Gao	United States
The Museum		Annette Elliot	United States
To Exist Under Permanent Suspicion		Valentin Noujaïm	France
Too Much Sand		Rosso Pérez Bueno	Sweden
Transylvanie		Rodrigue Huart	France
Trying	Estamos tentando	Guilherme Gomes, Julia Conatti	Brazil
Vox Humana		Don Josephus Raphael Eblahan	Philippines, United States, Singapore
We Are Not Alone		Adebukola Bodunrin	Canada, United States
Where the Mountain Women Sing		Juefang Zhang	Hong Kong, Taiwan, United States
Winter Portrait		Fernando Saldivia Yáñez	United States
You Cant Get What You Want But You Can Get Me		Samira Elagoz, Z Walsh	Netherlands, Finland, Germany, United States

=== After Dark ===
English Title	Original Title	Director(s)	Production countrie(s)
Cloud	クラウド	Kiyoshi Kurosawa	Japan
Fréwaka		Aislinn Clarke	Ireland
Grafted		Sasha Rainbow	New Zealand
Párvulos		Isaac Ezban	Mexico
The Rule of Jenny Pen		James Ashcroft	New Zealand
Vulcanizadora		Joel Potrykus	United States

=== Comedy ===
English Title	Original Title	Director(s)	Production countrie(s)
Long Good Thursday	Mielensäpahoittajan rakkaustarina	Mika Kaurismäki	Finland
The Missile	Ohjus	Miia Tervo	Finland, Estonia
Silent Trilogy	Mykkätrilogia	Juho Kuosmanen	Finland
Two to One	Zwei Zu Eins	Natja Brunckhorst	Germany
Universal Language	Une langue universelle / آواز بوقلمون	Matthew Rankin	Canada

=== Retrospective ===
English Title	Original Title	Director(s)	Production countrie(s)
Compensation (1999)		Zeinabu Irene Davis	United States
The Man Without a Past (2002)	Mies vailla menneisyyttä	Aki Kaurismäki	Finland
The Package (1989)		Andrew Davis	United States
The Spook Who Sat by the Door (1973)		Sam Greenlee	United States
Toni Erdmann (2016)		Maren Ade	Germany
Retrospective: Hirokazu Kore-eda
After Life (1998)	ワンダフルライフ	Hirokazu Kore-eda	Japan
After the Storm (2016)	海よりもまだ深く	Hirokazu Kore-eda	Japan
Broker (2022)	브로커	Hirokazu Kore-eda	South Korea
Like Father, Like Son (2013)	そして父になる	Hirokazu Kore-eda	Japan
Nobody Knows (2004)	誰も知らない	Hirokazu Kore-eda	Japan
Shoplifters (2018)	万引き家族	Hirokazu Kore-eda	Japan

== Official awards ==
The following awards were presented for films shown in International Competition:

- Gold Hugo: Vermiglio by Maura Delpero
- Silver Hugo, Jury Award: All We Imagine as Light by Payal Kapadia
- Silver Hugo, Best Director: Miguel Gomes for Grand Tour
- Silver Hugo, Best Actor: Benjamin Voisin for The Quiet Son
- Silver Hugo, Best Actress: Elín Hall for When the Light Breaks
- Silver Hugo, Best Screenplay: Mohammad Rasoulof for The Seed of the Sacred Fig
- Silver Hugo, Best Editing: Telmo Churro and Pedro Filipe Marques for Grand Tour
- Special Mention: Ensemble Performance for On Becoming a Guinea Fowl
