= Kraft paper =

Type of paper or paperboard

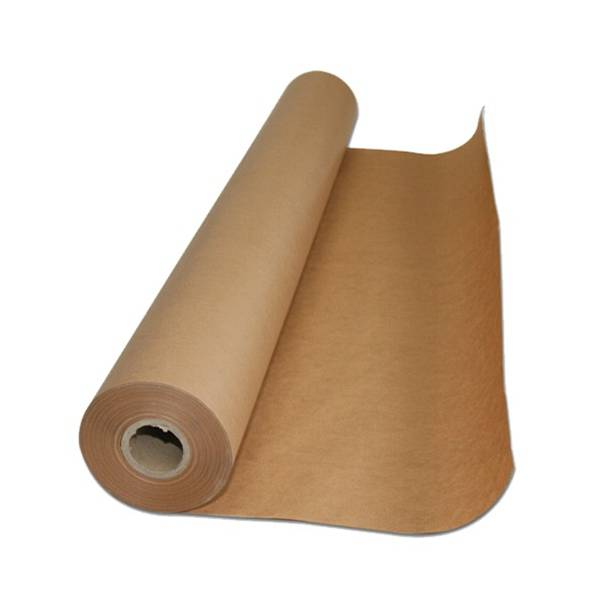
A roll of kraft paper

Kraft paper or kraft, also known as brown paper, is paper or paperboard (cardboard) produced from chemical pulp produced in the kraft process.

Sack kraft paper (or just sack paper) is a porous kraft paper with high elasticity and high tear resistance, designed for packaging products with high demands for strength and durability.

== Description ==
Pulp produced by the kraft process is stronger than that made by other pulping processes; acidic sulfite processes degrade cellulose more, leading to weaker fibers, and mechanical pulping processes leave most of the lignin with the fibers, whereas kraft pulping removes most of the lignin present originally in the wood. Low lignin is important to the resulting strength of the paper, as the hydrophobic nature of lignin interferes with the formation of the hydrogen bonds between cellulose (and hemicellulose) in the fibers.

Kraft pulp is darker than other wood pulps, but it can be bleached to make very white pulp. Fully bleached kraft pulp is used to make high-quality paper where strength, whiteness, and resistance to yellowing are important.

Sack kraft paper is a porous kraft paper with high elasticity and high tear resistance, designed for packaging products with high demands for strength and durability.

== Name ==
Kraft paper, and the kraft process used to produce it, are named from the German word kraft, meaning strength, in reference to its mechanical properties. This shares an origin with the English word craft, leading to linguistic confusion with paper intended for artistic uses and paper craft.

== Manufacture ==
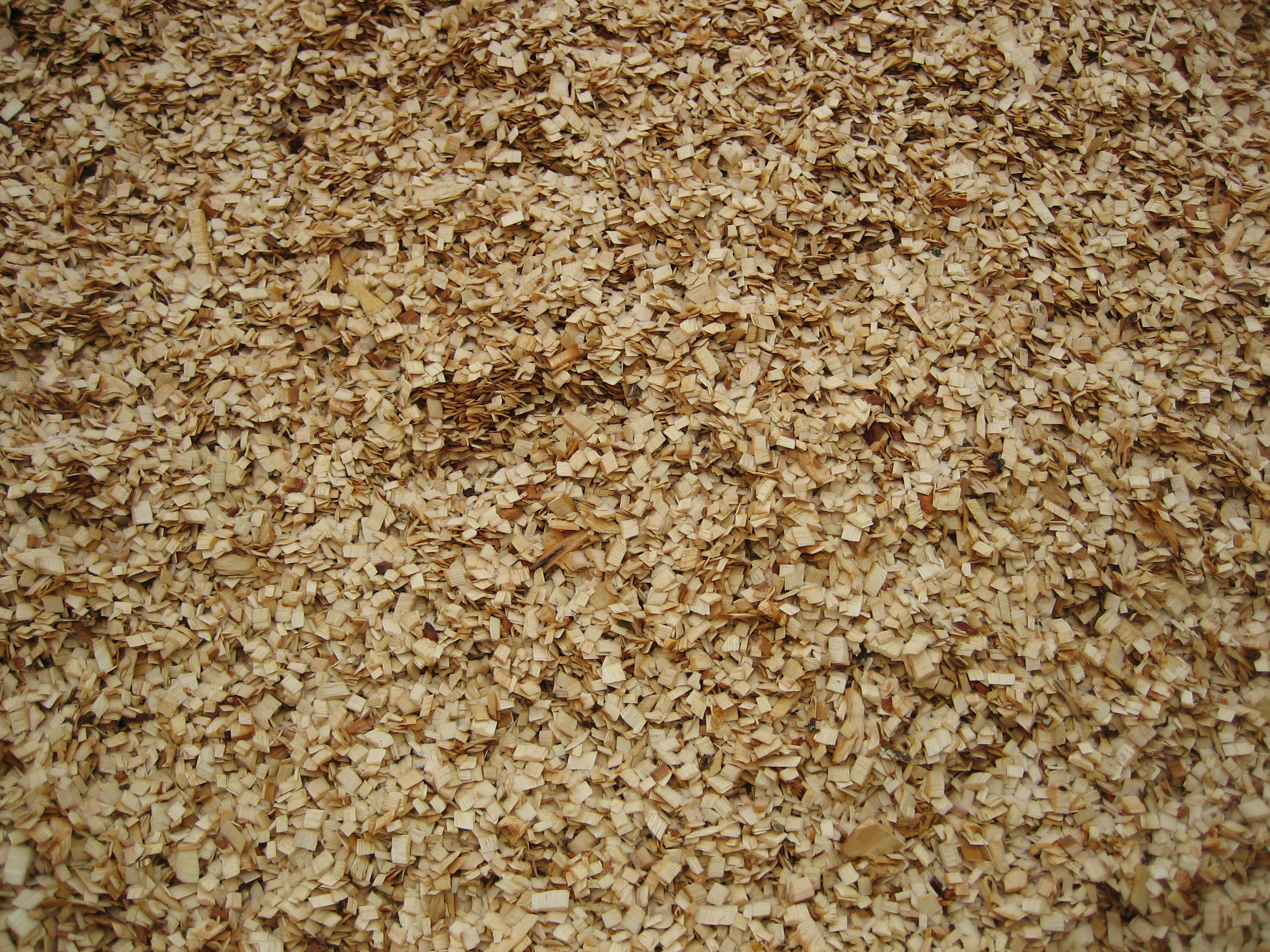
Woodchips used for kraft paper production

Wood pulp for sack paper is made from softwood by the kraft process. The long fibers provide the paper its strength and wet strength chemicals are added to even further improve the strength. Both white and brown grades are made. Sack paper is then produced on a paper machine from the wood pulp. The paper is microcrepped to give porosity and elasticity. Microcrepping is done by drying with loose draws allowing it to shrink. This causes the paper to elongate 4% in the machine direction and 10% in the cross direction without breaking. Machine direction elongation can be further improved by pressing between very elastic cylinders causing more microcrepping. The paper may be coated with polyethylene (PE) to ensure an effective barrier against moisture, grease and bacteria, although recyclability is hindered. Zein coatings are also water resistant but allow better recyclability.

A paper sack can be made of several layers of sack paper depending on the toughness needed.

Kraft paper is produced on paper machines with moderate machine speeds. The raw material is normally softwood pulp from the kraft process.

Maintaining a high effective sulfur ratio or sulfidity is important for the highest possible strength using the kraft process.

The kraft process can use a wider range of fiber sources than most other pulping processes. All types of wood, including very resinous types like southern pine, and non-wood species like bamboo and kenaf can be used in the kraft process.

== Qualities ==
- Normal kraft paper is strong and relatively coarse. It has high tensile strength. The grammage is normally 40–135 g/m^{2}.
- Sack kraft paper, or just sack paper, is a porous kraft paper with high elasticity and high tear resistance, designed for packaging products with high demands for strength and durability.
- Absorbent kraft paper is made with controlled absorbency (i.e., a high degree of porosity). It is made of clean low kappa hardwood kraft and has to have a good uniformity and formation.
- Spinning kraft paper is an especially strong type of kraft paper with relatively low grammage (40 g/m^{2}). This paper requires the best possible machine direction strength and cross machine elongation. This is done by high fiber orientation on the paper machine.
- Hunting cartridge paper is a kraft paper used in shotgun shells. This paper needs a high tensile strength in the machine direction, which is the axial direction of the cartridges. In the cross direction, the cartridge is supported by the gun-pipe, but a sufficient elongation is needed. The body of the cartridge is wound of a kraft paper of 80–120 g/m^{2}, which is further covered by an outer sheet of 60–80 g/m^{2} with color and printing.
- Candy wrapping paper and twisting paper are thin 30–40 g/m^{2} kraft papers and are mostly flexo or offset printed. These papers require a good strength, with highly oriented fibers. Twisting paper is mostly opaque and often supercalendered.

== Applications ==
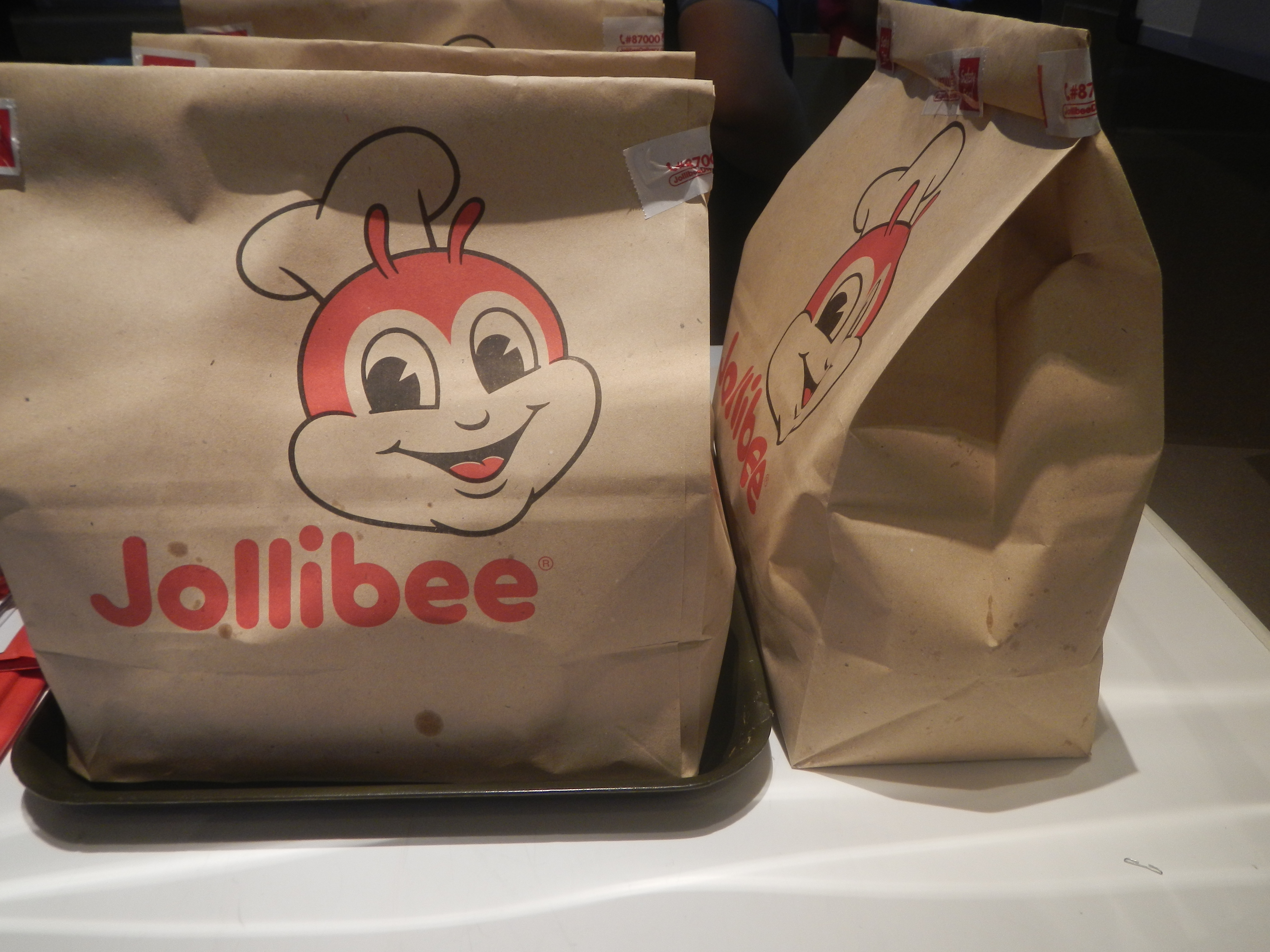
Kraft paper bags

- As a plastic-hazard-free paper in paper sacks for cement, food, chemicals, consumer goods, flour bags etc.
- Electrical insulation in large oil-filled transformers
- Paper grocery bags, multiwall sacks, gift bags, envelopes, ring binders, and other packaging
- An inexpensive material for lining particle boards
- The base paper for sandpaper
- As wrapping for flower bouquets
- In World War II, for fabricating drop tanks
- As a wrapping for the French dish Gigot bitume, which consists of a leg of lamb wrapped in Kraft paper and cooked in hot asphalt

== See also ==
- Butcher paper
- Corrugated fiberboard
- Gift wrapping
- Manila paper
- Paper bag
- Paper sack
- Parchment paper
