= In Reality (film) =

- Poster
- Directed by: Ann Lupo
- Written by: Ann Lupo
- Produced by: Ann Lupo; Holly Meehl
- Starring: Ann Lupo; Miles G. Jackson; Kimiko Glenn
- Cinematography: Nadine Martinez
- Edited by: Ann Lupo; S. Olden; Erin Sullivan
- Music by: James Lavino
- Distributed by: Giant Pictures
- Release dates: July 2018 (Woods Hole Film Festival); March 29, 2019
- Running time: 92 minutes
- Country: United States
- Language: English

In Reality is a 2018 American romance film written and directed by Ann Lupo and starring Lupo, Miles G. Jackson and Kimiko Glenn.

== Cast ==
- Ann Lupo as Ann
- Miles G. Jackson as John
- Kimiko Glenn as Lallie
- Olivia Washington as Adrienne
- Esteban Pedraza as Miguel
- Lauren E. Banks as Rachel
- John Racioppo as Luke
- Robert James Gardner
- Jill Eikenberry as Aunt Doreen

== Release ==
The film was released on March 29, 2019.

== Reception ==
Gary Goldstein of the Los Angeles Times gave the film a positive review and wrote, “…it remains a convincing, relatable look at one woman’s inner workings and the vicissitudes of love and friendship.”

The Hollywood Reporter also gave the film a positive review, calling it “a cohesive picture that, though certainly not for everyone, feels like an honest personal statement.”
