= Benjamin Tatar =

American actor

- Born: January 23, 1930
- Died: November 29, 2012 (aged 82)

Benjamin Tatar (January 23, 1930 – November 29, 2012) was an American film, television, theater, and voice actor who was Jackie Gleason's aide and had lived with Ava Gardner.

== Early life ==
Tatar was born on January 23, 1930, in Pittsburgh, Pennsylvania to a Jewish-American family. His interest in acting and entertainment began as a student at Schenley High School in Pittsburgh; he also began acting at the Pittsburgh Playhouse and the YM and WHA as a high school student. Tatar enlisted in the United States Army during the Korean War. After his discharge from the Army, he enrolled in the University of Pittsburgh where he received a bachelor's degree in drama and English. He also worked part-time at the Original Hot Dog Shop in East Liberty, which was owned by his uncle.

Following college, Tatar won a scholarship in 1955 to attend an acting-affiliate of the American Theatre Wing in New York City. The other scholarship student at that time was James Earl Jones. The prestige of the school and Ben's solid acting talent won him excellent working relationships with influential theatre folk, and his Pittsburgh connections, including director Henry Weinstein, brought him the social company of Marilyn Monroe and Arthur Miller.

== Career ==
Tatar began his television career behind the scenes, first as a cue card holder for such shows as The Kate Smith Show and The Jimmie Rodgers Show. He also read and answered mail sent by fans to those shows and to The Honeymooners, starring Jackie Gleason. Working with Jackie Gleason as his personal assistant provided Ben with a working journey to Paris, traveling aboard the SS United States, to make the movie Gigot, directed by Gene Kelly. His additional film credits included The Thin Red Line, which was filmed in location in Spain and released in 1964; the 1965 film Battle of the Bulge; and The Wind and the Lion in 1975. He was also in Patton, and worked as director of the English versions and as dialogue coach for films of Vicente Aranda, whose work included The Blood-Spattered Bride and The Exquisite Cadaver, during which he got to know actress Capucine and became companion to actress Judy Matheson.Tatar also worked with Telly Savalas.

Tatar worked in Spain throughout the 1960s and 1970s, where he became a language voice dubbing director and voice-over artist for television and film production companies based in the Spain. His fluency in five languages – English, French, German, Italian and Spanish – aided him in the profession.

He did many advertising commercials, including a Fockink commercial for Fockink dry gin.

== Pittsburgh ==
In 1981, Tatar moved back from New York City to his native Pittsburgh to care for his mother. He settled in Pittsburgh's Highland Park neighborhood, where he resided for more than thirty years. Away from the acting hubs in New York and Los Angeles, Tatar turned his professional attention to local theater, as well as film and television productions filmed on-location in the Pittsburgh area.

Tatar's return to Pittsburgh benefited Pittsburgh cultural endeavors: he did much acting and directing and also voice-overs. He was a member of the JCC Theatre Club for many years. His later work included productions at the Pittsburgh Irish and Classical Theatre and for the Jewish Theatre of Pittsburgh. He also appeared in numerous low-budget horror films produced in Pittsburgh.

In 1995, Tatar appeared in the Hallmark Hall of Fame television movie, The Piano Lesson, which was written by playwright, August Wilson, another Pittsburgh native.

== Personal life ==
Tatar authored an unpublished autobiography titled, The Dream Never Dies, in which he wrote of his early career, his work with leading actors on various films, his relationship with Ava Gardner and his voice-over career in Spain. In addition to acting, Tatar created word searches and compiled crossword puzzles for the publishing firm Dell Publishing.

== Death ==
Tatar died from chronic pulmonary disease at UPMC Shadyside in Pittsburgh, Pennsylvania, on November 29, 2012, at the age of 82. Tatar, who never married, was buried at B'nai Israel Cemetery.

== Films ==
1995 The Piano Lesson – as the watermelon man

1993 The Cemetery Club – man

1990 Two Evil Eyes – actor

1975 The Wind and the Lion – sketch artist

1972 Pancho Villa – as Private Bates

1969 Land Raiders – as Loomis

1967 Bang, Bang Kid – as Leech

1966 Battle of the Bulge – actor

1965 Crack in the World – as Indian Ambassador

1964 The Thin Red Line – actor

== Television ==
Piano Lesson (1995) – actor

Bride in Black (1991) – actor
