= Lou Myers (actor) =

American actor (1935–2013)

- Born: Lewis Eddy Myers; September 26, 1935; Chesapeake, West Virginia, U.S.
- Died: February 19, 2013 (aged 77); Charleston, West Virginia, U.S.
- Burial place: Donel C. Kinnard Memorial State Veterans Cemetery, Dunbar, West Virginia
- Education: West Virginia State University (BA); New York University (MFA)
- Occupation: Actor
- Known for: Role as Vernon Gaines on the NBC-TV series A Different World
- Military service
- Allegiance: United States
- Branch: United States Air Force
- Service years: 1951–1953
- Rank: Airman first class
- Conflicts: Korean War
- Children: 1

Lewis Eddy Myers (September 26, 1935 – February 19, 2013), also known professionally as Lou Myers or alternately as Lou Leabengula Myers, was an American actor and pianist.

Myers appeared in many movies, plays, and television programs. He made his Broadway debut in 1975 as Reverend Mosely in the production The First Breeze of Summer, alongside Ethel Ayler, Moses Gunn, Bebe Drake, and Barbara Montgomery. He joined them in recreating their roles for a television adaptation that aired on Great Performances in 1976.

Myers was an original cast member of many August Wilson plays, including Ma Rainey's Black Bottom, Fences, and The Piano Lesson.

He is perhaps best known as the feisty Mr. Vernon Gaines in the sitcom A Different World. Myers was also an accomplished pianist and founder/director of the Tshaka Ensemble Players in Africa.

== Early life ==
Myers was born in Chesapeake, West Virginia, the son of Dorothy Louise Brown Myers and Otis Louis Myers, a coal miner who spoke fluent German. He joined the U.S. Air Force in 1951. He was discharged in 1953 and went on to earn a bachelor's degree in sociology from West Virginia State University and an MFA in theatre from NYU.

== Personal life ==
Myers had a son, named Melvin Myers, and a grandson.

Myers died at the Charleston Area Medical Center in West Virginia after battling pneumonia for several months.

== Awards ==
Myers won an NAACP Image Award for his role as the Stool Pigeon in the August Wilson play King Hedley II. He also won the Off-Broadway AUDELCO Award for his role in the play Fat Tuesday.

In 2005 the Appalachian Education Initiative listed Myers as one of 50 "Outstanding Creative Artists" from the State of West Virginia and featured him in their coffee table book Art & Soul.

== Filmography ==
Year	Film	Role	Other notes
1991	Missing Pieces	Attendant	
1994	Cobb	Willie	
1995	The Piano Lesson	Wining Boy	TV movie
1994	Living Single	Milton "The Baker"	
1995	The Passion of Darkly Noon	Quincy	
1996	Tin Cup	Clint	
1997	Volcano	Pastor Lake	
1998	Mama Flora's Family	Albie	TV mini-series
1998	Goodbye Lover	Police Captain	
1998	Bulworth	Uncle Tyrone	
1998	How Stella Got Her Groove Back	Uncle Ollie	
1999	The Big Confession	Tommy	
1999	The Stand-In	Half-Step Wilson	
2001	The Wedding Planner	Burt Weinberg	
2001	All About You	Toomie	
2002	Friday After Next	Mr. Johnson (Deleted scene only)	
2003	The Fighting Temptations	Homer T.	
2003	Nobody Knows Anything!	Blue Smoke Jones	
2004	Team Player	Coach Lou	
2007	Kings of the Evening	Counter Man	
2010	It's Kind of a Funny Story	Jimmy	
2013	Dreams	Mr. Harlan	(final film role)
