= I'm a Virgo =

2023 American television series

- Genre: Afro-surrealism; Comedy-drama; Science fiction; Surreal comedy
- Created by: Boots Riley
- Directed by: Boots Riley
- Starring: Jharrel Jerome; Olivia Washington; Brett Gray; Kara Young; Allius Barnes; Walton Goggins; Mike Epps; Carmen Ejogo
- Music by: Tune-Yards
- Country of origin: United States
- Original language: English
- No. of episodes: 7

Production
- Executive producers: Boots Riley; Tze Chun; Michael Ellenberg; Jharrel Jerome; Adam Merims; Lindsey Springer
- Editors: Saira Haider; Tom Eagles; Ron Rauch
- Running time: 22–37 minutes
- Production companies: Media Res; Amazon Studios

Original release
- Network: Amazon Prime Video
- Release: June 23, 2023

I'm a Virgo is an American surreal comedy television miniseries created and directed by Boots Riley and starring Jharrel Jerome. The first four episodes premiered at South by Southwest in March 2023, and all seven episodes were released on Amazon Prime Video three months later.

== Synopsis ==
Cootie, a sheltered boy, has grown to be 13 feet tall by the age of 19. He is being raised by his aunt Lafrancine and uncle Martisse in Oakland, California, where he is shielded from the outside world until a group of teenage political activists inadvertently learn of his existence.

== Cast ==
=== Main ===
- Jharrel Jerome as Cootie, a 13-foot-tall sheltered teenager
- Olivia Washington as Flora, a fry cook with the power of super speed
- Brett Gray as Felix, a loyal friend who is obsessed with his car
- Kara Young as Jones, a young activist with the power of "psychic theatre"
- Allius Barnes as Scat, a member of the gang obsessed with the existential cartoon Parking Tickets

=== Special guest stars ===
- Walton Goggins as Jay Whittle / The Hero, a billionaire who acts as a local superhero
- Mike Epps as Martisse, Cootie's uncle and guardian
- Carmen Ejogo as Lafrancine, Cootie's aunt and guardian
- Kendrick Sampson as Edwin Garrison, The Hero's assistant

=== Guest stars ===
- Elijah Wood as Studious Guy
- Joel Edgerton as the voice of a UPS driver in the fictional show Parking Tickets
- Danny Glover as the voice of a weatherman in Parking Tickets
- Juliette Lewis as the voice of Justin, a character in Parking Tickets
- Slavoj Žižek as the voice of the Baby in Parking Tickets
- Omar Miller as Damian Wallace, a man facing execution
- Morgan Fairchild as Cressley Whittle, The Hero's mother

== Episodes ==
| No. | Title | Directed by | Written by | Original release date |
|---|---|---|---|---|
| 1 | "You a Big Muthaf*cka" | Boots Riley | Boots Riley | June 23, 2023 |
| 2 | "The Universe and My Spirit" | Boots Riley | Boots Riley | June 23, 2023 |
| 3 | "Paco Rabanne" | Boots Riley | Tze Chun | June 23, 2023 |
| 4 | "Balance Beam" | Boots Riley | Whitney White | June 23, 2023 |
Jones is at a house party flirting and making out with a comrade. Felix arrives at the party, in tears, and interrupts them. Elsewhere, Cootie and Flora are having their first sexual experience together. Back at the party, Jones announces that Scat is dead and directs the partygoers to go to Krown Hospital's headquarters. At the demonstration, Felix is drinking and starts a fight with Jones. Cootie and Flora arrive, and Cootie expresses shock that Scat was mistreated by hospital staff and "left to die." Jones gives a speech to the crowd describing the "phenomenon" that killed Scat: "the crisis of capitalism." The police begin to tear gas and assault the crowd. Flora uses her speed to deflect the gas canisters. Cootie, seemingly radicalized by Jones' speech and remembering Scat's words, hops over the line of police and demonstrators and begins to spray paint Scat's name on the side of the headquarters. The Hero arrives and surprises Cootie with a knockout punch. He then drags a chained-up Cootie through the streets. The episode closes with his slogan, a favorite of Cootie's, "get your mind right halfwits."
| 5 | "Brillo, If Possible" | Boots Riley | Marcus Gardley | June 23, 2023 |
Bear wakes up after a night of drag racing and is surprised to find himself shrunken. He rides around his neighborhood, the Lower Bottoms, and notices all of his neighbors are now miniature sized as well. The media coverage of Cootie and the demonstration has started. Under house arrest, Cootie tells his aunt there's a difference between The Hero he experienced during the demonstration and who he experiences while reading the comic; he sees the comic version as "ideal." The people from the Lower Bottoms, still shrunken and now losing their jobs, decide they need to take "decisive action" against whoever did this to them. Meanwhile, Cootie and Flora are spending day and night together, watching Parking Tickets and reading. They begin to annoy each other with their idiosyncrasies and habits. When Flora leaves, Cootie continues to watch the news. A general strike has spread from the demonstration. As Cootie watches all the negative media depictions of him, he begins to get angry. In a conversation with his aunt and uncle, he tells them that he's going to be the villain that the media is making him out to be. They tell him that they've been preparing for this moment and reveal that the house is fortified, and that they have built weapons for him.
| 6 | "It Requires Trust on My Part" | Boots Riley | Michael R. Jackson | June 23, 2023 |
| 7 | "A Metaphor for What" | Boots Riley | Boots Riley | June 23, 2023 |

== Production ==
=== Development ===
On June 22, 2020, it was reported that Boots Riley was creating a new series with Michael Ellenberg of Media Res, starring Jharrel Jerome, called I'm a Virgo. Riley started writing in 2019. On December 14, 2020, it was reported that the half-hour series would be a co-production between Media Res and Amazon Studios. Riley and Jerome executive produce alongside Michael Ellenberg and Tze Chun. The cast also includes Mike Epps, Carmen Ejogo, Brett Gray, Allius Barnes, Kara Young and Olivia Washington. On May 23, 2026, during the press tour for I Love Boosters, Riley stated that there were no plans for a second season after having to cut 40% of the script, including a penultimate episode, due to budget issues two weeks before production began.

=== Filming ===
Principal photography took place primarily in New Orleans, Louisiana, with outdoor shooting on location in Oakland, California. The show utilizes practical effects with miniatures and puppets for some shots.

=== Music ===
The soundtrack is provided by Riley's group The Coup, and Tune-Yards provided the score.

== Release ==
The first four episodes premiered at the South by Southwest film festival on March 11, 2023. The seven-part series was released on Prime Video on June 23, 2023.

== Reception ==
The review aggregator website Rotten Tomatoes reports a 96% approval rating with an average rating of 8.10/10, based on 61 critic reviews. The website's critics consensus reads, "Boots Riley's towering imagination looms as large as his supersized hero in I'm a Virgo, an uproarious satire that's given an enormous heart to match by star Jharrel Jerome." Metacritic gave the series a weighted average score of 86 out of 100 based on 26 critic reviews, indicating "universal acclaim".

Ben Travers of Indiewire rated the series a B+, calling it "a visually imaginative parable with a moving message". Chase Hutchinson of Collider rated the series an A and called it "big on ambition yet precisely focused". Erin Brady of /Film wrote that it is "one of the streaming era's most interesting and offbeat projects [...] Riley's unique visual style and the dynamic performances from its eclectic cast make it unlike anything you'll watch this year".

=== Accolades ===
The show was nominated in the category of Outstanding Special (Practical) Effects in a Photoreal or Animated Project at the 22nd Visual Effects Society Awards.
