= The Piano Lesson (1995 film) =

1995 American television film by Lloyd Richards

- VHS cover
- Genre: Drama
- Based on: The Piano Lesson by August Wilson
- Teleplay by: August Wilson
- Directed by: Lloyd Richards
- Starring: Charles S. Dutton; Alfre Woodard; Carl Gordon; Tommy Hollis; Lou Myers; Courtney B. Vance
- Music by: Stephen James Taylor
- Country of origin: United States
- Original language: English

Production
- Executive producers: Richard Welsh; Craig Anderson
- Producer: August Wilson
- Cinematography: Paul Elliott
- Editor: Jim Oliver
- Running time: 95 minutes
- Production companies: Craig Anderson Productions; Hallmark Hall of Fame Productions

Original release
- Network: CBS
- Release: February 5, 1995

The Piano Lesson is a 1995 American drama television film directed by Lloyd Richards and written by August Wilson, based on his 1987 play of the same name. The film stars Charles S. Dutton and Alfre Woodard, and relies on most of its cast from the original Broadway production. The film originally aired on CBS on February 5, 1995, as an episode of Hallmark Hall of Fame.

It received widespread critical acclaim, and won a 1995 Peabody Award. The film earned nine nominations at the 47th Primetime Emmy Awards, with Wilson earning multiple nominations including one for Outstanding Made for Television Movie. Dutton and Woodard also earned nominations for Outstanding Lead Actor in a Miniseries or a Special and Lead Actress in a Miniseries or a Special, with Dutton also receiving a nomination at the 53rd Golden Globe Awards for his performance. Woodard was awarded Outstanding Performance by a Female Actor in a Miniseries or Television Movie at the 2nd Screen Actors Guild Awards.

== Plot ==
In 1936, Boy Willie and his friend Lymon travel from Mississippi to Pittsburgh, where he wishes his sister Berniece will give him the family's heirloom piano so that he can sell it to buy land from Mr. Sutter, a descendant of the family that once owned Willie's own ancestors as slaves. The piano itself had at one time belonged to the wife of the original Sutter, the white former owner of their family. Decades earlier, Berniece and Boy Willie's grandfather had, at the slave master's instructions, carved the black family's African tribal history and American slave history into the piano's surface.

When Boy Willie arrives, his Uncle Doaker tells Willie that Berniece won't part with the piano. Berniece's friend Avery had also tried to get her to sell the piano, but she refused to sell. As selling the piano would be like turning her back on their people and their past, Berniece continues to refuse.

== Cast ==
- Charles S. Dutton as Boy Willie
- Alfre Woodard as Berniece Charles
- Carl Gordon as Doaker
- Tommy Hollis as Avery
- Lou Myers as Wining Boy
- Courtney B. Vance as Lymon
- Zelda Harris as Maretha
- Tim Hartman as Sutter
- Rosalyn Coleman as Grace
- Tommy Lafitte as Ace
- Lynne Innerst as Miss Ophelia
- Harold Surratt as Papa Willie Boy
- Elva Branson as Mama Berniece
- Ben Tatar as Watermelon Man
- Alice Eisner as Watermelon Lady
- Bob Tracey as Nolander

== Production ==
Filming took place in Pittsburgh.

== Recognition ==
DVD Verdict wrote that the "excellent writing leaps off the screen." While noting that most TV films seem geared "towards the lowest common Nielsen family demographic", they write that "something crafted, filled with inordinate drama and rich, dimensional characters just blares across the airwaves, filling up your deepest, hungry cinematic aesthetic," and that this recognition is the case for the Hallmark Hall of Fame adaptation of August Wilson's Pulitzer Prize winning play The Piano Lesson. They noted that Wilson has been long known for "profound, deeply moving portraits of African Americans in the United States," and that he "understands the issues facing minorities better than most modern playwrights do." They called the film a "brilliant analog," and a "fable of magic realism."

TV Guide wrote that the film is "a wrenching but flawed cable adaptation of August Wilson's play," and that while the film was another Wilson "folk tale about the legacy of slavery," that "Sadly, this particular production fails to make any psychological or ectoplasmic ghosts come alive for the audience." They noted this was not because the film did not make the playwright's message clear, the problem was in "its obviousness" in that Wilson belabored his points.

=== Awards and nominations ===
Year	Award	Category	Nominee(s)	Result	Ref.
1995	Peabody Awards		CBS and Craig Anderson Productions, Inc., in association with Hallmark Hall of Fame Productions, Inc.	Won	
1995	Primetime Emmy Awards	Outstanding Made for Television Movie	Richard Welsh, Craig Anderson, August Wilson, Robert Huddleston, and Brent Shields	Nominated	
1995	Primetime Emmy Awards	Outstanding Lead Actor in a Miniseries or a Special	Charles S. Dutton	Nominated	
1995	Primetime Emmy Awards	Outstanding Lead Actress in a Miniseries or a Special	Alfre Woodard	Nominated	
1995	Primetime Emmy Awards	Outstanding Individual Achievement in Directing for a Miniseries or a Special	Lloyd Richards	Nominated	
1995	Primetime Emmy Awards	Outstanding Writing for a Miniseries or a Special	August Wilson	Nominated	
1995	Primetime Emmy Awards	Outstanding Individual Achievement in Art Direction for a Miniseries or a Special	James William Newport, Tim Saternow, and Diana Stoughton	Nominated	
1995	Primetime Emmy Awards	Outstanding Individual Achievement in Costume Design for a Miniseries or a Special	Vicki Sánchez	Nominated	
1995	Primetime Emmy Awards	Outstanding Individual Achievement in Editing for a Miniseries or a Special – Single Camera Production	Jim Oliver	Nominated	
1995	Primetime Emmy Awards	Outstanding Sound Mixing for a Drama Miniseries or a Special	Michael C. Moore, David E. Fluhr, John Asman, and Sam Black	Nominated	
1996	Cinema Audio Society Awards	Outstanding Achievement in Sound Mixing for Television – Movie of the Week, Mini-Series or Specials	Michael C. Moore, David E. Fluhr, John Asman, and Sam Black	Won	
1996	Golden Globe Awards	Best Actor in a Miniseries or Motion Picture Made for Television	Charles S. Dutton	Nominated	
1996	NAACP Image Awards	Outstanding Television Movie or Mini-Series		Nominated	
1996	NAACP Image Awards	Outstanding Actor in a Television Movie or Mini-Series	Charles S. Dutton	Nominated	
1996	NAACP Image Awards	Outstanding Actress in a Television Movie or Mini-Series	Alfre Woodard	Won	
1996	Screen Actors Guild Awards	Outstanding Performance by a Female Actor in a Miniseries or Television Movie	Alfre Woodard	Won	
