= Gigot =

Gigot (English: /dʒiːˈɡoʊ/, French: [ʒiɡo]) is a French surname. Notable people with the surname include:

- Edward Gigot (1847–1928), German-born Canadian merchant and politician
- Francis Gigot (1859–1920), French Roman Catholic priest
- François Gigot de la Peyronie (1678–1747), French surgeon
- Maurice-Joseph-Louis Gigot d'Elbée (1752–1794), French Royalist military leader
- Paul Gigot (born 1955), American political commentator and editor
- Tony Gigot (born 1990), French rugby league player
- Samuel Gigot (born 1993), French football player

== See also ==
- Gigot bitume, a French meat dish
- Gigot (film), American film
