= The Piano Lesson =

1987 play by August Wilson

- Written by: August Wilson
- Characters: Doaker; Berniece; Boy Willie; Lymon; Avery; Wining Boy; Maretha; Grace
- Original language: English
- Series: The Pittsburgh Cycle
- Subject: The various members of an African-American family in the 1930s strive to overcome the past.
- Genre: Drama
- Setting: The living room and kitchen of Doaker Charles's household. Pittsburgh, 1936.

Premiere
- Date premiered: 26 November 1987
- Place premiered: Yale Repertory Theatre; New Haven, Connecticut

The Piano Lesson is a 1987 play by American playwright August Wilson. It is the fourth play in Wilson's The Pittsburgh Cycle. Wilson began writing this play by playing with the various answers regarding the possibility of "acquir[ing] a sense of self-worth by denying one's past". The Piano Lesson received the 1990 Pulitzer Prize for Drama, and earned five nominations at the 44th Tony Awards.

A Romare Bearden painting, The Piano Lesson, inspired Wilson to write a play featuring a strong female character to confront African-American history, paralleling Troy in earlier Fences. However, on finishing his play, Wilson found the ending to stray from the empowered female character as well as from the question regarding self-worth. What The Piano Lesson finally seems to ask is: "What do you do with your legacy, and how do you best put it to use?"

Set in 1936 Pittsburgh during the aftermath of the Great Depression, The Piano Lesson follows the lives of the Charles family in the Doaker Charles household and an heirloom, the family piano, which is decorated with designs carved by an enslaved ancestor. The play focuses on the arguments between a brother and a sister who have different ideas on what to do with the piano. The brother, Boy Willie, is a sharecropper who wants to sell the piano to buy the land (Sutter's land) where his ancestors toiled as slaves. The sister, Berniece, remains emphatic about keeping the piano, which shows the carved faces of their great-grandfather's wife and son during the days of their enslavement.

The play was adapted into a television film of the same name in 1995, which won a Peabody Award and received multiple nominations at the Primetime Emmy Awards. It was later adapted again in 2024 for Netflix. The 2013 Off-Broadway production earned four Lucille Lortel Awards and two Obie Awards, while the 2023 revival of the play earned Tony Award nominations for Best Revival of a Play and Best Featured Actor in a Play for Samuel L. Jackson.

== Plot ==
=== Act 1 ===
Scene 1: Boy Willie and Lymon arrive in Pittsburgh, Pennsylvania, from Mississippi and enter the Charles' household at five in the morning. They have brought a truck of watermelons to sell. Against Doaker's advice, Boy Willie wakes his sister Berniece, and tells her of Sutter's death. Berniece accuses Boy Willie of shoving Sutter down a well, and she asks him to leave. Instead, Boy Willie wakes Berniece's daughter, Maretha, causing Berniece to run back up the stairs where she sees Sutter's ghost. Lymon notices the piano which Willie intends to sell to buy Sutter's land. Doaker insists that Berniece will not sell the piano, because she refused to sell when Avery brought a buyer to the house. Willie insists that he will convince her. Maretha comes downstairs, and Willie asks her to play the piano. She plays the beginning of a few simple tunes, and he answers her song with a boogie-woogie. Berniece enters with Avery, and Willie asks whether she still has the prospective buyer's name, explaining he came to Pittsburgh to sell the piano. Berniece refuses to listen and walks out.

Scene 2: Wining Boy and Doaker talk in the kitchen when Boy Willie and Lymon enter and claim to have located the piano buyer. Willie's uncles warn him that Sutter will cheat him but Boy Willie refuses to listen. The story behind Lymon and Boy Willie's term in Parchman Prison Farm is revealed. Lymon and Willie both gather different perspectives from their experiences. Lymon wants to flee to the North where he will be better treated, while Willie feels that whites only treat blacks badly if the blacks do not try to stop them. They ask Wining Boy to play the piano, but instead he explains that being seen as nothing more than a piano player became a burden. Doaker then tells the story of the piano's history. Generations earlier, Sutter, their family's slave-owner, broke up a family by selling a mother and child to pay for the piano which he bought for his wife as an anniversary present. The wife was happy with the piano but missed having the slaves, so Sutter had that family's husband/father (who was a carpenter and too valuable to sell), carve their likenesses on the piano. He carved likenesses of his entire history on the piano. In 1911, Boy Willie's father stole the piano from the Sutters; in retaliation he was killed. Willie declares that these are stories of the past and that the piano should now be put to good use. Willie and Lymon attempt to move the piano to test its weight. As soon as they try to move it, Sutter's ghost is heard. Berniece tells Willie to stop and informs him that he is selling his soul for money. Willie refutes her, Berniece blames Crawley's death on Willie, and the two engage in a fight. Upstairs, Maretha is confronted by the ghosts, and she screams in terror.

=== Act 2 ===
Scene 1: Doaker and Wining Boy are again together in the house alone. Doaker confesses that he saw Sutter's ghost playing the piano and feels that Berniece should discard the piano so as to prevent spirits from traumatizing the Charles family. Wining Boy disagrees. Lymon and Willie walk into the room after a watermelon sale. Wining Boy sells his suit and shoes to Lymon, promising its swooning effects on women. Both Lymon and Willie leave the house in hot pursuit of women.

Scene 2: Later that day as Berniece is preparing for her bath, Avery enters and proposes that Berniece should open up and let go. He tells her that she cannot continue to live her life with Crawley's memory shut inside her. Berniece changes the topic and asks Avery to bless the house, hoping to destroy the spirit of the Sutter ghost. Avery then brings up the piano and tells Berniece she should learn to not be afraid of her family's spirits and play it again. Berniece breaks down her story of her mother's tears and blood mingled with her father's soul on the piano and refuses to open her wounds for everyone to see.

Scenes 3–5: Boy Willie enters the Charles house with Grace and begins to fool around on the couch. Berniece orders them out and opens the door to see Lymon. Lymon is upset over his inability to woo women and begins to talk about women's virtues to Berniece. The two kiss, breaking Berniece's discomfort over Crawley's death, and Berniece heads back upstairs. The next morning, Lymon and Willie try to move the piano out and are stopped by Uncle Doaker. Willie, frustrated, demands that he will sell the piano no matter what. The day to move the piano draws closer. Excited to sell the piano, Willie quickly partakes on his actions without a care of his sister's words. Berniece appears with Crawley's gun, leading Doaker and Avery to urge them to talk it through first. Sutter's presence as a ghost is suddenly revived. Avery attempts to drive the ghost away with his blessings but is not successful. Suddenly, Berniece knows that she must play the piano again as a plea to her ancestors. Finally, the house is led to a calm aura, and Willie leaves to head back to Mississippi. Before leaving however, he reminds Berniece to keep playing on the piano, or he and Sutter will return.

== Characters ==
Doaker Charles: The owner of the Charles household; the uncle of Berniece and Boy Willie. He lives with his niece Berniece and great-niece Maretha. A tall and thin 47-year-old man, Charles recounts the most detailed parts of his lives with his job on the railroad. Doaker plays the role of the storyteller, giving detailed and long accounts of the piano's history. Due to his old age, his connection to the past is expressed through his stories.

"Ain't nobody said nothing about who's right and who's wrong. I was just telling the man about the piano. I was telling him why we say Berniece ain't gonna sell it."

Doaker is also one of the only characters that truly understand Berniece's desire not to sell the piano so that the legacy of their family may remain. He may maintain a neutral view of whether the piano should be kept or sold, but he does prevent Boy Willie from taking the piano and bolting without Berniece's knowledge.

Boy Willie: Berniece's impulsive 30-year-old brother represents the lack of accepting one's past. A sharecropper and recently delivered out of prison from Mississippi, Boy Willie plans to sell the piano and use the earnings to buy the land where his ancestors had formerly toiled. His use of the legacy comes down to practicality; Willie finds the rich culture of his history engraved on the piano through pictures, blood, and tears to be a simple conversion to money. Rather than looking upon his past and accepting it, Boy Willie finds the constant need to prove himself as equal to the white man.

"If my daddy had seen where he could have traded that piano in for some land of his own, it wouldn't be sitting up here now. He spent his whole life farming on somebody else's land. I ain't gonna do that. See, he couldn't do no better. When he come along he ain't had nothing he could build on. His daddy ain't had nothing to give him. The only thing my daddy had to give me was that piano. And he died over giving me that. I ain't gonna let it sit up there and rot without trying to do something with it."

Unable to understand the importance of keeping one's legacy around one to understand and grow from it, Boy Willie only concerns himself with labels and capital. In the last scene of the book, after Berniece calls to the ancestors, Boy Willie finally understands that there is no escape from living his ancestral legacy and the only way to benefit from it is to learn from it.

Lymon: Lymon is the 29-year-old friend of Boy Willie and is much more secretive and shy in comparison; however, upon becoming more comfortable with the family, his attitude changes to be a sympathizer who doesn't offer many original opinions. He does not speak brashly and attempts to escape the law by staying in the North and starting a new life.

"Yeah, I can see why you say that now. I told Boy Willie he ought to stay up here with me."

One of the few characters in this play not related to the members of the Charles household, Lymon offers help and sporadic advice to the other characters. He listens to Doaker's version of the piano story, sympathizes with Boy Willie's desires to sell the piano, and attempts to understand Berniece's connection to the piano. Lymon is also obsessed with women and plays a large role in allowing Berniece to slowly relieve the mourning of Crawley, her deceased husband.

"I just dream about woman. Can't never seem to find the right one."

His desire to please women and find his soul mate softens Berniece's gaze on crude men and gives him a slight leeway to kiss her.

Berniece: The 35-year-old mother of Maretha, Berniece symbolizes the guardian of her ancestors' past. She remains the only member of the family to adamantly demand the keepsake of the piano heirloom. Her relation with her brother further portrays her mourning of her late husband Crawley. Blaming Boy Willie for Crawley's death, Berniece questions Boy Willie's foolish actions more than others. While Boy Willie represents an opposing figure to their father Boy Charles by wanting to be a property-owning man, Berniece draws similarities to her mother Mama Ola, who never seemed to recover from the mourning of her husband, either.

"Look at this piano. Look at it. Mama Ola polished this piano with her tears for seventeen years. For seventeen years she rubbed on it till her hands bled. Then she rubbed the blood in...mixed it up with the rest of the blood on it. Every day that God breathed life into her body she rubbed and cleaned and polished and prayed over it. 'Play something for me, Berniece. Play something for me, Berniece.' Every day... You always talking about your daddy but you ain't never stopped to look at what his foolishness cost your mamma."

Berniece feels as if the piano should stay in the home rather be sold as it is a family heirloom. The piano is in her residence and was the one who was led to the piano first. She did not feel the need to rearrange her ancestors' past and instead embraced it. To Berniece, the piano represents her father's life, since he died over it, and her mother's toil, since she incessantly asked Berniece to play after his death. Originally playing the role of the messenger between the dead ancestors and the living descendants, Berniece prefers to stop channeling her family's ghosts after her mother's death. Since she does not want to disturb the spirits in the piano, Berniece leaves the piano untouched and does not play it.

"I told you I don't play on that piano...When my mama died I shut the top on that piano and I ain't never opened it since. I was only playing it for her. When my daddy died seem like all her life went into that piano. She used to have me play on it...say when I played it she could hear my daddy talking to her. I used to think them pictures come alive and walked through the house. Sometime late at night I could hear my mama talking to them. I said that wasn't gonna happen to me I don't play that piano 'cause I don't want to wake them spirits. They never be walking around in this house."

To save her daughter from the burdens that Berniece had to endure from playing the piano and helping her mother go through the pain and misery of losing her husband, Berniece refuses to let the spirits of her ancestors come back into her life. However, in the last scene, Berniece finally resumes her role as the middle person between the living and dead. In this last scene, Berniece plays the piano again and fulfills her duty to her family's legacy.

Maretha: The 11-year-old daughter of Berniece, Maretha plays the role of the future generation for the Charles family. Although Berniece teaches her how to play the piano, she does not allow any history of the piano to become apparent to Maretha.

"Maretha...don't know nothing about it...She don't have to carry all of that with her. She got a chance I didn't have. I ain't gonna burden her with that piano."

Maretha's encounters with ghosts are approached without Berniece's liking. Maretha also allows experimentation among the future progeny of the Charles family, leading observations regarding the best way to pass down family history.

Avery Brown: A 38-year-old preacher who has been attempting to court Berniece ever since the death of Crawley, Avery Brown is a man of honest and good intentions. Constantly stressing his Christian view on things and advocating his hopes to build a congregation, Avery is aware that Berniece will never sell her piano heirloom. Also not related to the Charles family, Avery often offers advice to Berniece in an effort to help her let go of the fears of her past and the lingering mourning of her husband.

"You got to put all that behind you, Berniece. That's the same thing like Crawley. Everybody got stones in their passway. You got to step over them or walk around them. You picking them up and carrying them with you. All you got to do is set them down by the side of the road. You ain't got to carry them with you. You can walk over there right now and play that piano...and God will walk over there with you."

Avery's humble personality further emphasizes Berniece's lack of relieving her deceased husband's memory. He tries desperately to help her find her path and supports her through her pain. In the final scene, Avery's blessings on the house help bring Berniece back to her position of communicating between the living and the deceased.

Wining Boy: The comical figure in The Piano Lesson, the Wining Boy is the 56-year-old elder brother of Doaker Charles. He tries to portray the image of a successful musician and gambler, but his music and attire are extremely dated. Instead of wanting to live in the present and the future like his nephew Boy Willie, Wining Boy drowns himself in the sorrows of his past. Whenever he ends up bankrupt, he wanders back into the Charles house to retell the days of the glory and fame.

"I give that piano up. That was the best thing that ever happened to me, getting rid of that piano...Now, the first three or four years of that is fun. You can't get enough whiskey and you can't get enough women and you don't never get tired of playing that piano. But that only last so long. You look up one day and you hate the whiskey, and you hate the women, and you hate the piano. But that's all you got. You can't do nothing else. All you know how do is play the piano. Now, who am I? Am I me? Or am I the piano player?"

His former days of glory emphasize the submergence of his soul in the past. Wining Boy is also the only other character, aside from Berniece, who can speak with the dead. He speaks to the Ghosts of the Yellow Dog and to his deceased wife, Cleotha.

Grace: One of the last figures to be added to the play, Grace shows the desires of both Boy Willie and Lymon. Both men attempt to be with her and play to her good graces. Since she is not a member of the Charles family, the tension she feels in the last scene of Act Two demonstrates how strong the presence of the ancestral ghosts are in the Charles household.

Mentioned characters

- Crawley: Berniece's deceased husband of three years
- Mama Ola: Berniece and Boy Willie's mother
- Boy Charles: Berniece and Boy Willie's father
- Sutter's Ghost: The man who owned the Charles family in the time of slavery
- Cleotha: Wining Boy's deceased wife

== Cast and characters ==
Characters	Yale Repertory Theatre cast 1987	Original Broadway cast 1990	First Broadway revival 2022
Doaker Charles	Carl Gordon	Carl Gordon	Samuel L. Jackson
Boy Willie	Samuel L. Jackson	Charles S. Dutton	John David Washington
Lymon	Rocky Carroll	Rocky Carroll	Ray Fisher
Berniece	Starletta DuPois	S. Epatha Merkerson	Danielle Brooks
Maretha	Cheneé Johnson; Ylonda Powell	Apryl R. Foster	Nadia Daniel; Jurnee Elizabeth Swan
Avery	Tommy Hollis	Tommy Hollis	Trai Byers
Wining Boy	Lou Myers	Lou Myers	Michael Potts
Grace	Sharon Washington	LisaGay Hamilton	April Matthis

== Productions ==
The Piano Lesson debuted as a staged reading at the 1986 National Playwrights Conference held at the Eugene O'Neill Theater Center.

The first production opened on November 26, 1987 at the Yale Repertory Theatre. The cast featured Carl Gordon, Samuel L. Jackson, Rocky Carroll, Starletta DuPois, Chenee Johnson, Ylonda Powell, Tommy Hollis, Lou Myers, and Sharon Washington. The production was directed by Lloyd Richards and featured set design by E. David Cosier, Jr., costume design by Constanza Romero, lighting design by Christopher Akerlind, sound design by J. Scott Servheen, and musical direction by Dwight Andrews.

It then opened at the Huntington Theatre Company in Boston on January 9, 1988. Charles S. Dutton assumed Jackson's role. The Piano Lesson was subsequently performed at the Goodman Theatre in Chicago. S. Epatha Merkerson and LisaGay Hamilton assumed DuPois and Washington's roles, respectively. The production then premiered on Broadway with the same cast at the Walter Kerr Theatre on April 16, 1990.

The Piano Lesson was revived off-Broadway in 2012 in a production directed by Ruben Santiago-Hudson and with a cast including Chuck Cooper and Brandon J. Dirden. David Rooney of The Hollywood Reporter wrote that it may well be "the most perfect staging this play will ever receive."

A Broadway revival of the play, directed by LaTanya Richardson Jackson, began previews on September 19, 2022 at the Ethel Barrymore Theatre, starring Samuel L. Jackson, Danielle Brooks, John David Washington, Ray Fisher, Trai Byers, Michael Potts, and April Matthis. The production opened on October 13, 2022, and was performed through January 29, 2023. The production has been praised for its cast, but received some criticism for its direction. According to Gloria Oladipo of The Guardian, "Wilson's seminal work is tonally misread, flattened into a sitcom about a haunted piano versus a family struggling to forge anew amid their past."

== Awards and nominations ==
=== 1990 Broadway production ===
Year	Award	Category	Nominee	Result
1990	Tony Award	Best Play	August Wilson	Nominated
1990	Tony Award	Best Actor in a Play	Charles S. Dutton	Nominated
1990	Tony Award	Best Featured Actor in a Play	Rocky Carroll	Nominated
1990	Tony Award	Best Featured Actress in a Play	S. Epatha Merkerson	Nominated
1990	Tony Award	Best Direction of a Play	Lloyd Richards	Nominated
1990	Drama Desk Award	Outstanding Play	August Wilson	Won
1990	Drama Desk Award	Outstanding Actor in a Play	Charles S. Dutton	Nominated
1990	Drama Desk Award	Outstanding Actress in a Play	S. Epatha Merkerson	Nominated
1990	Drama Desk Award	Outstanding Featured Actor in a Play	Rocky Carroll	Nominated
1990	Drama Desk Award	Outstanding Director of a Play	Lloyd Richards	Nominated
1990	Pulitzer Prize	Drama	August Wilson	Won
1990	New York Drama Critics' Circle	Best Play	August Wilson	Won

=== 2013 Off-Broadway production ===
On April 3, 2013, the production earned six Lucille Lortel Award nominations, winning in four categories on May 5. On April 23, the Off-Broadway production was recognized with Drama League Award nominations for Outstanding Revival of a Broadway or Off-Broadway Play and with two Distinguished Performance Award nominations, but failed to win any awards. The production received an Outer Critics Circle Award nomination. The play earned three 58th Drama Desk Award nominations. On May 7, the show earned a Theatre World Award for Best Debut Performance to be presented on June 3.

Dirden won a 2013 Obie Award for Performance on May 20, while Santiago-Hudson won one for Direction. On May 8, the production was nominated for a 2013 Off-Broadway Alliance Award for Best Play Revival. It was announced as the winner on May 21.

Year	Award	Category	Nominee	Result
2013	Drama League Award	Outstanding Revival of a Broadway or Off-Broadway Play		Nominated
2013	Drama League Award	Distinguished Performance Award	Brandon J. Dirden	Nominated
2013	Drama League Award	Distinguished Performance Award	Roslyn Ruff	Nominated
2013	Outer Critics Circle Award	Outstanding Revival of a Play (Broadway or Off-Broadway)		Nominated
2013	Drama Desk Award	Outstanding Revival of a Play		Nominated
2013	Drama Desk Award	Outstanding Featured Actor in a Play	Chuck Cooper	Nominated
2013	Drama Desk Award	Outstanding Director of a Play	Ruben Santiago-Hudson	Nominated
2013	Lucille Lortel Award	Outstanding Revival		Won
2013	Lucille Lortel Award	Outstanding Lead Actress	Roslyn Ruff	Won
2013	Lucille Lortel Award	Outstanding Lead Actor	Brandon J. Dirden	Nominated
2013	Lucille Lortel Award	Outstanding Featured Actor	Chuck Cooper	Won
2013	Lucille Lortel Award	Outstanding Director	Ruben Santiago-Hudson	Won
2013	Lucille Lortel Award	Outstanding Lighting Design	Rui Rita	Nominated
2013	Theatre World Award	Best Debut Performance	Brandon J. Dirden	Won
2013	Off Broadway Alliance Awards	Best Play Revival		Won
2013	Obie Award	Performance	Brandon J. Dirden	Won
2013	Obie Award	Direction	Ruben Santiago-Hudson	Won

=== 2022 Broadway production ===
Year	Award	Category	Nominee	Result
2023	Tony Awards	Best Revival of a Play		Nominated
2023	Tony Awards	Best Featured Actor in a Play	Samuel L. Jackson	Nominated
2023	Drama Desk Awards	Outstanding Revival of a Play		Won
2023	Drama Desk Awards	Outstanding Featured Performance in a Play	Danielle Brooks	Nominated
2023	Drama Desk Awards	Outstanding Featured Performance in a Play	Ray Fisher	Nominated
2023	Drama Desk Awards	Outstanding Lighting Design of a Play	Japhy Weideman	Nominated
2023	Drama Desk Awards	Outstanding Wig and Hair	Cookie Jordan	Nominated
2023	Drama League Awards	Distinguished Performance Award	Danielle Brooks	Nominated
2023	Drama League Awards	Distinguished Performance Award	John David Washington	Nominated
2023	Drama League Awards	Outstanding Revival of a Play		Nominated
2023	Outer Critics Circle Awards	Best Featured Performer in a Broadway Play	Danielle Brooks	Nominated
2023	Outer Critics Circle Awards	Best Featured Performer in a Broadway Play	Michael Potts	Nominated
2023	Theatre World Awards		John David Washington	Honoree

== Film adaptations ==
A Hallmark Hall of Fame TV movie titled The Piano Lesson aired on CBS on February 5, 1995, starring Charles S. Dutton, Alfre Woodard, Carl Gordon, Tommy Hollis, Lou Myers, Courtney B. Vance, Zelda Harris, Rosalyn Coleman, Tommy Lafitteá, Lynne Innerst, Harold Surratt, Elva Branson, Tim Hartman, Ben Tatar, and Alice Eisner. Dutton, Gordon, Hollis, and Myers reprised their roles from the original Broadway production. It was also directed by Lloyd Richards.

On September 30, 2020, it was announced that Denzel Washington was planning to produce a new film adaptation for Netflix with Samuel L. Jackson and John David Washington. Filming was expected to begin Summer 2021 in Pittsburgh. In April 2023, it was reported that Malcolm Washington would direct the film, with a cast featuring Samuel L. Jackson, John David Washington, Ray Fisher, Danielle Deadwyler, Michael Potts, and Corey Hawkins. Jackson, Washington, Fisher, and Potts would reprise their roles from the 2022 Broadway revival.

== Bibliography ==
- Bryer, Jackson R., and Mary C. Hartig. Conversations with August Wilson. Jackson: University of Mississippi, 2006.
- Wilson, August. The Piano Lesson. New York: Theatre Communications Group, 2007.
- Wilson, August (1990). The Piano Lesson. New York: Plume. ISBN 0-452-26534-7.
