= Olivia Washington =

American actress

- Born: April 10, 1991 (age 35); Los Angeles, California, U.S.
- Education: New York University Tisch School of the Arts
- Occupation: Actress
- Years active: 2013–present
- Father: Denzel Washington
- Relatives: John David Washington (brother); Katia Washington (sister); Malcolm Washington (twin brother)

Olivia Washington (born April 10, 1991) is an American actress. A daughter of actor Denzel Washington, she is best known for her role as a girl with superspeed in the miniseries I’m a Virgo (2023), for which she was nominated for an Independent Spirit Award.

== Early life and education ==
Washington was born in Los Angeles to actor Denzel Washington and Pauletta Washington (née Pearson). Her twin brother is filmmaker Malcolm Washington and her older siblings are Katia and John David Washington. In 2013, Washington graduated with a bachelor’s degree from the New York University Tisch School of the Arts.

== Career ==
Following small roles in series such as Madoff and Mr. Robot, Washington appeared as Margaret in The Public Theater's 2019 production of Much Ado About Nothing.

Washington appeared in the 2022 drama Breaking. For her performance as burger cook Flora in the Boots Riley television series I'm a Virgo the following year, Washington was nominated for an Independent Spirit Award. In 2024, Washington was cast alongside Fisayo Akinade and Kit Harington in the West End production of Slave Play by Jeremy O. Harris, at the Noël Coward Theatre.

== Acting credits ==
=== Film ===
Year	Title	Role	Notes
2013	The Butler	Olivia	—N/a
2016	The Comedian	May’s Assistant	—N/a
2016	Sorry for Your Loss	Johnna	Short film
2017	Green Brothers		—N/a
2017	The Forever Tree	Tawny Bennett	Short film
2017	An Act of Terror	Virginia Christian	Short film
2018	In Reality	Olivia	—N/a
2019	The Public’s Much Ado About Nothing	Margaret	Recorded version of the 2019 production of Much Ado About Nothing at The Public Theater
2021	The Corner Store	Olivia Watts	Short film
2021	The Little Things	Amy Anders	—N/a
2021	The Tragedy of Macbeth	Children’s Nurse	—N/a
2022	Breaking	Cassandra Brown-Easley	—N/a
2024	The Piano Lesson	Young Mama Ola	—N/a

=== Television ===
Year	Title	Role	Notes
2015	Empire	Dee	1 episode
2016	Madoff	Agent Cacioppi	4 episodes
2016	Mr. Robot	FBI Agent	3 episodes
2018	Chicago P.D.	Michelle	1 episode
2019	She’s Gotta Have It	Dutch	2 episodes
2019	Great Performances	Margaret	Recorded version of the 2019 production of Much Ado About Nothing at The Public Theater
2021	Robin Roberts Presents: Mahalia	Estelle	TV movie
2021	A Holiday in Harlem	Jazmin	TV movie
2023	I’m a Virgo	Flora	7 episodes

=== Theater ===
Year	Title	Role	Notes
2019	Much Ado About Nothing	Margaret	Production at The Public Theater
2024	Slave Play	Kaneisha	Noël Coward Theatre, London

=== Music videos ===
Year	Title	Artist(s)
2026	"Don't Leave Me on the Dance Floor"	Carly Rae Jepsen

== Awards and nominations ==
Year	Award	Category	Nominated work	Result	Ref
2022	Sundance Film Festival	U.S. Dramatic Special Jury Award for Best Ensemble Cast	Breaking	Won	
2024	Film Independent Spirit Awards	Best Supporting Performance in a New Scripted Series	I'm a Virgo	Nominated	
