= John David Washington =

American actor and football player (born 1984)

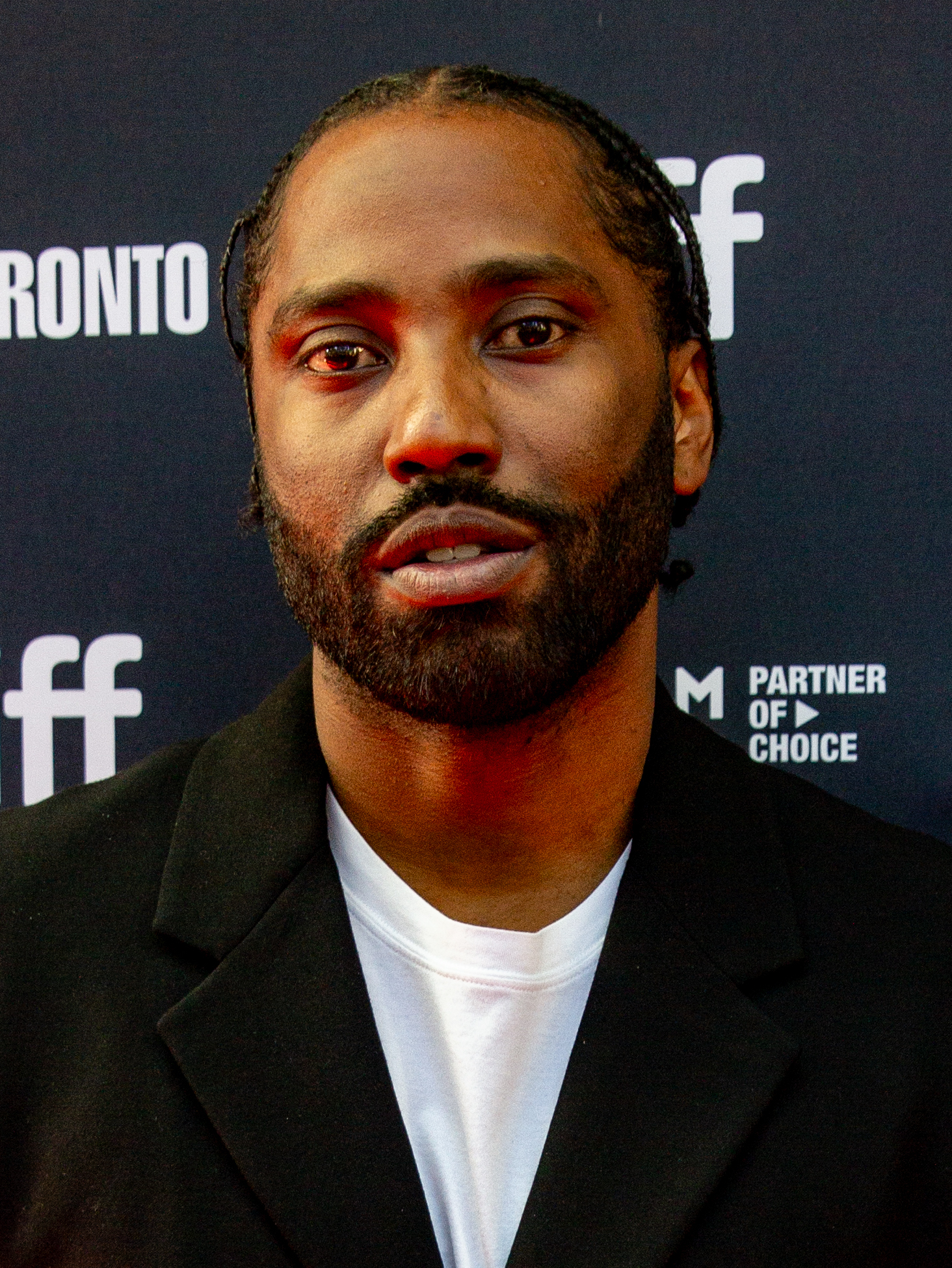
- Washington in 2024
- Born: July 28, 1984 (age 42); Los Angeles, California, U.S.
- Education: Morehouse College (BA)
- Occupations: Actor; football player
- Years active: 2006–2012 (sports); 1992–present (acting)
- Parent(s): Denzel Washington, Pauletta Washington
- Relatives: Katia Washington (sister); Olivia Washington (sister); Malcolm Washington (brother)
- Football career

No. 35, 28
- Position: Running back

Personal information
- Listed height: 5 ft 9 in (1.75 m)
- Listed weight: 208 lb (94 kg)

Career information
- College: Morehouse (2002–2005)
- NFL draft: 2006: undrafted

Career history
- St. Louis Rams (2006–2007)*; Rhein Fire (2007); California Redwoods (2009); Sacramento Mountain Lions (2010–2012)
- * Offseason or practice squad member only

John David Washington (born July 28, 1984) is an American actor and former professional football player. A son of actor Denzel Washington, he started his career in college football at Morehouse College and signed with the St. Louis Rams as an undrafted free agent in 2006. Professionally, Washington spent four years as a running back for the United Football League's Sacramento Mountain Lions. He shifted to acting, and was part of the main cast of the HBO comedy series Ballers (2015–2019) and appeared in the western film The Old Man & the Gun (2018). Washington's breakthrough role came playing Ron Stallworth in Spike Lee's crime drama BlacKkKlansman (2018), for which he received Golden Globe Award and Screen Actors Guild Award nominations.

Washington has since gained leading roles in films such as Tenet (2020), Malcolm & Marie (2021), and The Creator (2023). He made his Broadway debut in the 2022 revival of the August Wilson play The Piano Lesson, and reprised his role in its 2024 film adaptation.

== Early life and family ==
John David (Note: John David is his first name rather than his first and middle name.) Washington was born on July 28, 1984 in Toluca Lake, Los Angeles, California, where he grew up. He is the oldest of four children born to actor Denzel Washington and actress and singer Pauletta Washington (née Pearson). At the age of seven, he played a student in Spike Lee's 1992 feature film Malcolm X, which starred his father in the title role.

Washington attended Campbell Hall School in Los Angeles, where he was a letterman in football, basketball, and track. He graduated from high school in 2002, and from Morehouse College in 2006.

== Football career ==
=== College ===
As a Morehouse College senior, Washington led the conference in rushing with 1,198 yards (a school record). He also had a 5.6-yard average, nine touchdowns, and ten receptions for 69 yards. In his college career, Washington held the school's single-game (242 yards) and career (3,699 yards) rushing records from 2005–2011.

=== Professional ===
After going undrafted in the 2006 NFL draft, Washington was signed by the St. Louis Rams on May 1, 2006, as an undrafted free agent. Washington was released by the Rams on August 31. Three days later, the Rams re-signed him to their practice squad. Washington played in NFL Europe for the Rhein Fire in the 2007 offseason.

Washington was drafted by the California Redwoods (later the Sacramento Mountain Lions) of the United Football League in the UFL Premiere Season Draft in 2009. He signed with the team on August 18. Washington stayed with the team after their move to Sacramento, playing for the Mountain Lions until 2012, when the league abruptly folded that October.

== Acting career ==
Washington began acting in 1992, appearing in the film Malcolm X alongside his father Denzel Washington; then, in 2015, he won the role of Ricky Jerret, an NFL player, in the HBO drama series Ballers. The series was well received by critics and continued for five seasons through 2019.

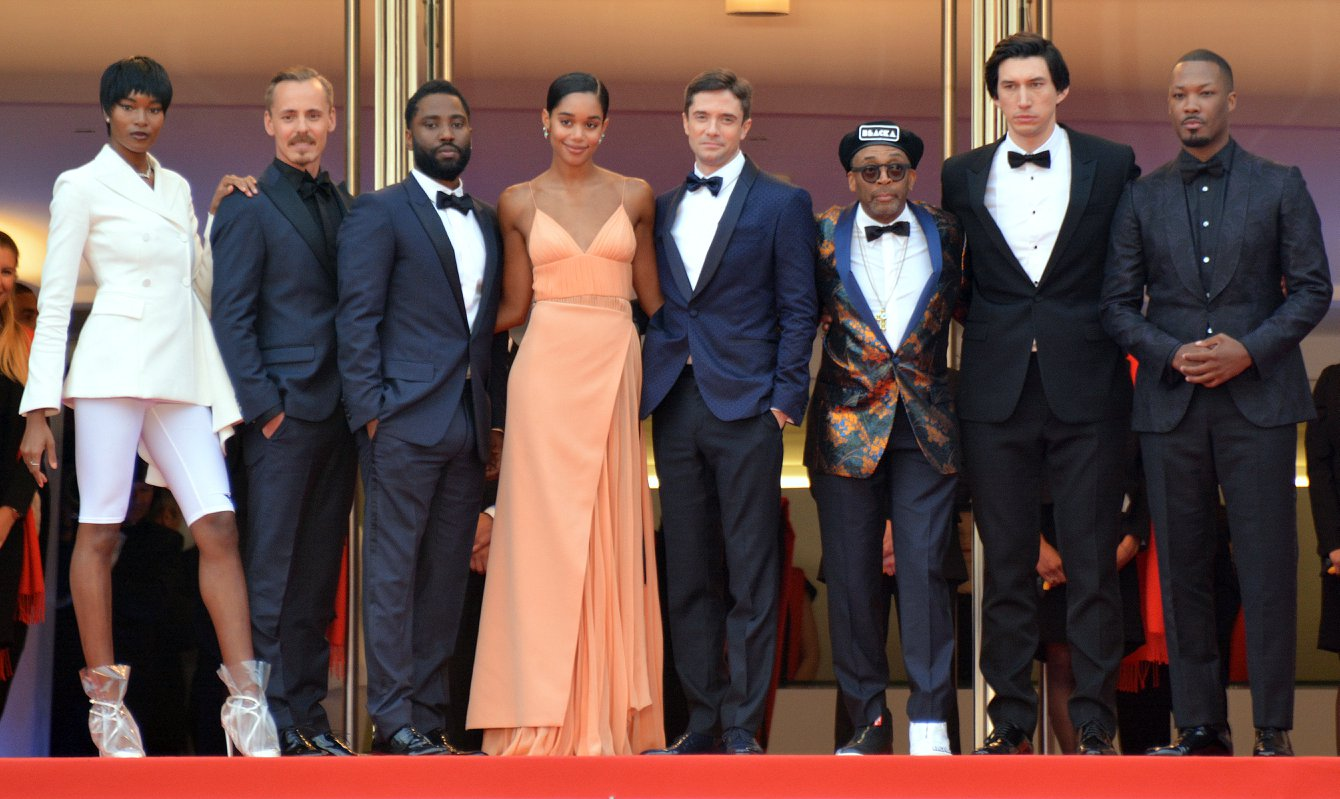
Washington (third from left) with the team of BlacKkKlansman at the 2018 Cannes Film Festival

In September 2017, Washington was cast in the lead role of detective Ron Stallworth in Spike Lee's thriller feature film BlacKkKlansman, which was based on Stallworth's memoir. The film premiered on May 14, 2018, at the 2018 Cannes Film Festival, where it competed for the Palme d'Or. It was awarded the Grand Prix by the festival jury. The film's American theatrical release was on August 10, 2018, a date chosen to coincide with the one year anniversary of the Charlottesville rally. The film was a commercial success, earning Washington both Golden Globe and Screen Actors Guild Award nominations. In 2018, Washington also starred in the films Monsters and Men and Monster, both of which screened in the U.S. Dramatic Competition section at the 2018 Sundance Film Festival. He also appeared in the western film The Old Man & the Gun.

After seeing Washington's work in BlacKkKlansman, director Christopher Nolan hand-picked him to star in his thriller film Tenet. Nolan said of the actor, "[He's] just one of the greatest collaborators I've worked with: extraordinarily hard-working, very, very thoughtful, and very considerate of everybody around him in the most wonderful way." Released in September 2020, Tenet received mixed reviews. Peter Travers of Rolling Stone praised Washington's "star-in-the-making" performance, writing, "A former football running back, the actor brings a natural athletic grace to the stunts and hand-to-hand combat that forge a visceral bond between his character and the audience." For his performance, Washington won the Saturn Award for Best Actor.

Washington starred alongside Zendaya as the titular characters in the drama film Malcolm & Marie (2021), which had been filmed in secret during the COVID-19 pandemic. The film was released to mixed reviews, but Washington's performance received praise. He starred as Harold Woodman, a lawyer and war veteran, in the ensemble period film Amsterdam (2022) directed by David O. Russell. He then had a starring role in Gareth Edwards' 2023 science fiction film The Creator.

Washington performed in a Broadway revival of August Wilson's The Piano Lesson beginning in September 2022 and ending in January 2023. He reprised his role in a 2024 film adaptation of the play, directed by his brother, Malcolm Washington.

In 2025, Washington became the face of Tom Ford's fragrance Bois Pacifique. In the latter half of 2026, he is set to star as a tech entrepreneur in the off-Broadway play Disruption with Jason Ralph, Conrad Ricamora, Jasmine Sharma, Joe Tippett and Shaunette Renée Wilson. He is set to star in Nikyatu Jusu's horror film Mime.

== Acting credits ==
=== Film ===
Year	Title	Role	Notes
1992	Malcolm X	Student in Harlem classroom	
1995	Devil in a Blue Dress	Boy with Toy Rifle	Uncredited
2010	The Book of Eli	—N/a	Co-producer
2017	Love Beats Rhymes	Mahlik	
2018	Monsters and Men	Dennis Williams	
2018	Monster	Richard "Bobo" Evans	
2018	BlacKkKlansman	Ron Stallworth	
2018	The Old Man & the Gun	Lieutenant Kelley	
2020	Tenet	The Protagonist	
2021	Malcolm & Marie	Malcolm Elliott	Also producer
2021	Beckett	Beckett	
2022	Amsterdam	Harold Woodsman	
2023	The Creator	Joshua Taylor	
2024	The Piano Lesson	Boy Willie Charles	
TBA	Mime	TBA	Also producer

=== Television ===
Year	Title	Role	Notes
2015–2019	Ballers	Ricky Jerret	Main cast; 47 episodes

=== Theater ===
Year	Title	Role	Category	Theatre	Ref.
2022	The Piano Lesson	Boy Willie Charles	Broadway	Ethel Barrymore Theatre	
2026	Disruption	Nick	Off-Broadway	Pershing Square Signature Center	

== Awards and nominations ==
Year	Awards	Category	Nominated work	Result	Ref.
2018	NAACP Image Awards	Outstanding Supporting Actor in a Comedy Series	Ballers	Nominated	
2018	IMDb STARmeter Awards	Breakout Star	Himself	Won	
2018	People's Choice Awards	The Drama Movie Star of 2018	BlacKkKlansman	Nominated	
2018	Online Film Critics Society	Best Actor	BlacKkKlansman	Nominated	
2019	Golden Globe Awards	Best Actor – Motion Picture Drama	BlacKkKlansman	Nominated	
2019	Satellite Awards	Best Actor in a Motion Picture, Comedy/Musical	BlacKkKlansman	Nominated	
2019	Screen Actors Guild Awards	Outstanding Performance by a Male Actor in a Leading Role	BlacKkKlansman	Nominated	
2019	Screen Actors Guild Awards	Outstanding Performance by a Cast in a Motion Picture	BlacKkKlansman	Nominated	
2019	NAACP Image Awards	Outstanding Supporting Actor in a Comedy Series	Ballers	Nominated	
2020	People's Choice Awards	Favorite Action Movie Star	Tenet	Nominated	
2021	Critics' Choice Super Awards	Best Actor in an Action Movie	Tenet	Nominated	
2021	Saturn Awards	Best Actor	Tenet	Won	
2024	Montclair Film Festival	Performance Award	The Piano Lesson	Honored	
2024	Chicago International Film Festival	Spotlight Award	The Piano Lesson	Honored	
2024	Gotham Awards	Ensemble Tribute (Note: Shared with Samuel L. Jackson, Danielle Deadwyler, Ray Fisher, Michael Potts, Corey Hawkins and Erykah Badu)	The Piano Lesson	Honored	
2024	Celebration of Cinema and Television	Actor Award – Film	The Piano Lesson	Won	
2025	Black Reel Awards	Outstanding Lead Performance	The Piano Lesson	Nominated	
2025	NAACP Image Awards	Outstanding Actor in a Motion Picture	The Piano Lesson	Nominated	
2025	NAACP Image Awards	Outstanding Ensemble Cast in a Motion Picture	The Piano Lesson	Nominated	
