= Gigot bitume =

French dish of lamb

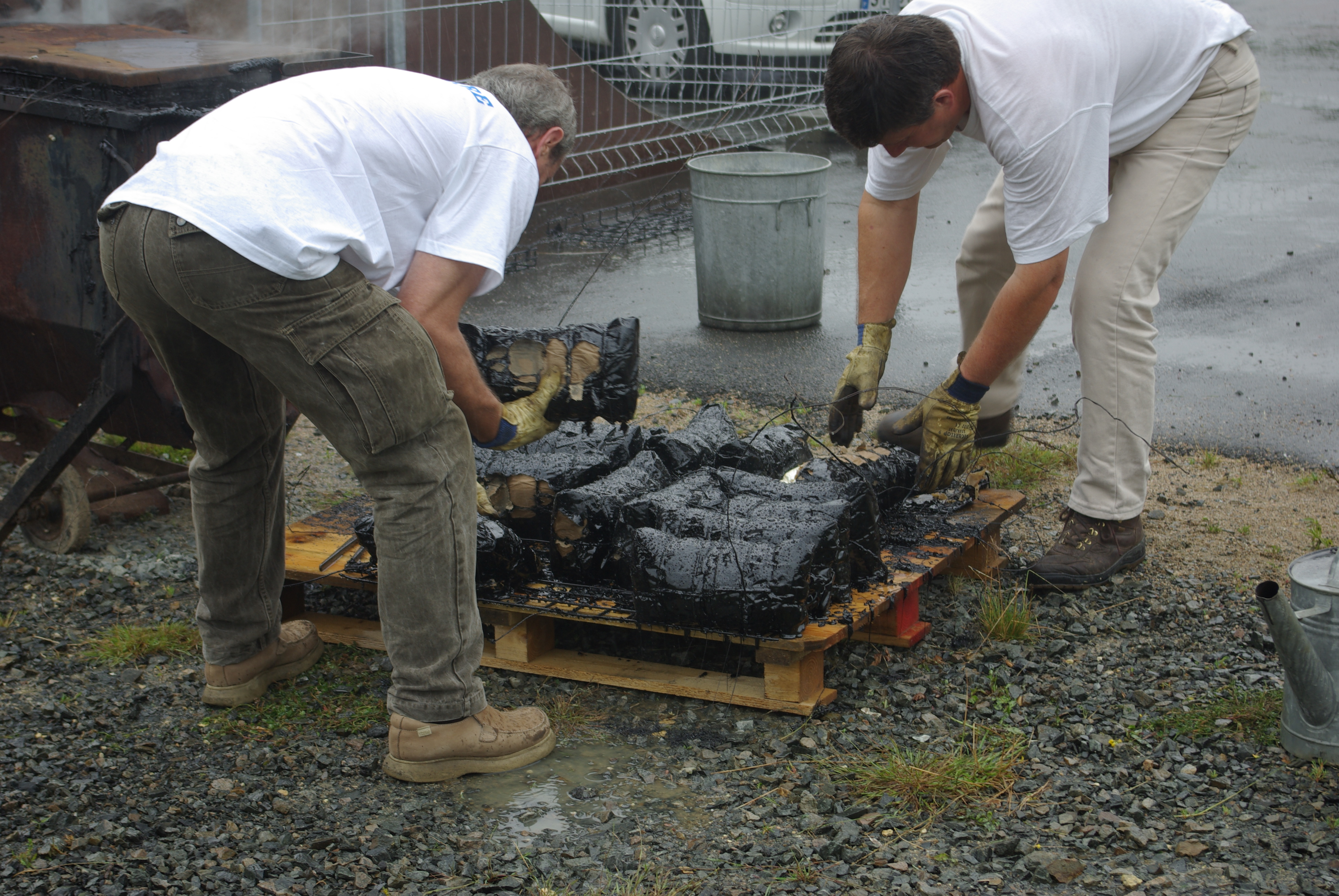
The lamb still in the paper.

A gigot bitume (French: [ʒiɡo bitym], transl. 'asphalt leg of lamb') is a French dish consisting of a leg of lamb prepared by wrapping the meat in kraft paper and placing it in a bath of hot asphalt. This preparation method is traditionally used in France to celebrate the completion of the structural portion of construction projects or public works.

A recipe for the dish, gigot cuit dans le goudron, appears in the 1900 cookbook La Vraie cuisine pratique: Les potages, les poissons, le bœuf, le veau, l'agneau, le mouton, le porc, la volaille, le gibier ("True Practical Cuisine: Soups, Fish, Beef, Veal, Lamb, Mutton, Pork, Poultry, Game")

This is a strange cooking method that can be put to good use by workers. I give the recipe as it was passed on to me. In a hot boiler of asphalt, when paving the ground, immerse a leg of lamb wrapped in very strong paper. With the assistance of a stone attached to one end, it will be pulled into the middle of the tar. One hour of cooking gives the meat a particularly excellent flavor. Salt when removed from the heat.

Usage of this cooking method by asphalt workers, in particular, has existed since the end of the 19th century.

In Val-de-Travers in western Switzerland, a similar tradition exists where a ham is cooked in asphalt (Jambon cuit dans l’asphalte).
