= Tommy Hollis =

American actor

- Born: March 22, 1954; Jacksonville, Texas
- Died: September 9, 2001 (aged 47); New York City, New York
- Occupation: Actor

Tommy Janor Hollis (March 22, 1954 – September 9, 2001) was an American film, television, and stage actor.

A native of Jacksonville, Texas, his first major film appearance was in Ghostbusters as the mayor's aide (1984). He played Earl Little in the Spike Lee-directed movie Malcolm X (1992).

Hollis died in New York City from complications of diabetes. He never married and had no children.

== Filmography ==
| Year | Title | Role | Notes |
|---|---|---|---|
| 1983 | Skyline | | |
| 1984 | Ghostbusters | Mayor's Aide | |
| 1987 | Moonstruck | Parking Attendant | |
| 1988 | L.A. Law | Geoffrey Marchant | Episode "The Son Also Rises" |
| 1989 | The Days and Nights of Molly Dodd | Singer | Episode "Here's Why You Order from the Spanish Side of the Menu" |
| 1990 | Astonished | Ivan / Fyodor | |
| 1991 | Great Performances | The Man / The Narrator | Episode "The Colored Museum" |
| 1991 | Separate But Equal | Harry Briggs Sr. | |
| 1992 | Stay the Night | Det. Clark | TV movie |
| 1992 | Malcolm X | Earl Little | |
| 1992 | I'll Fly Away | Oscar | 2 episodes |
| 1993 | Queen | Fred | Episode 1.3 |
| 1994 | The Vernon Johns Story | Coach Hill | TV movie |
| 1994 | Léon: The Professional | 2nd Policeman | |
| 1995 | The Piano Lesson | Avery | TV movie |
| 1995 | Zooman | Mr. Washington | TV movie |
| 1996 | Joe's Apartment | Boss Plumber | |
| 1996-2000 | Law & Order | Dean Isaac Wadleigh / Ed Monroe | 2 episodes, (final appearance) |
| 1997 | New York Undercover | Earl Briggs | Episode "Grim Reaper" |
| 1997 | Homicide: Life on the Street | Nelson Henson | Episode "Betrayal" |
| 1997 | First Time Felon | Judge | TV movie |
| 1998 | Primary Colors | Fat Willie | |
| 1998 | Mama Flora's Family | Reverend Jackson | 2 episodes |
| 1999 | Trinity | | Episode: "Breaking In, Breaking Out, Breaking Up, Breaking Down" |
| 2000 | Mary and Rhoda | News Cameraman | TV movie |
| 2000 | Now and Again | Guard #2 | Episode: "The Eggman Cometh" |
