= Carl Gordon (actor) =

American actor

- Born: Rufus Carl Gordon Jr. January 20, 1932; Goochland, Virginia, United States
- Died: July 20, 2010 (aged 78); Jetersville, Virginia, United States
- Occupation: Actor

Carl Gordon (January 20, 1932 – July 20, 2010) was an American actor who entered the acting profession later in life and was best known for his role in the Fox TV series Roc, in addition to a wide range of roles in film, on stage and television as a character actor.

== Life and career ==
Gordon was born Rufus Carl Gordon Jr. in Goochland, Virginia, and was always known by his middle name. He moved with his family as a child and was raised in Brooklyn's Bedford-Stuyvesant. He enlisted in the United States Air Force and served during the Korean War as an aircraft mechanic. After completing his military service, he attended Brooklyn College but dropped out to pursue employment.

Around 1970, Gordon had been twice married and twice divorced, had been unable to complete college and had only been able to find work as a sheet-metal worker and as a stockroom clerk that didn't interest and challenge him. As recounted by The New York Times, he fell to his knees one night and cried out "Lord, tell me what I need to do" and received the answer "Try acting". He enrolled at Gene Frankel's Theatre and Film Workshop, where he was the oldest student and the only African American. After many auditions, he started getting roles as a character actor on Broadway, in film and on television. He appeared in 1967 in the national tour of Happy Ending / Day of Absence, a pair of one-act plays by Douglas Turner Ward, and performed on stage in 30 productions by Ward's Negro Ensemble Company.

He appeared in films; in the 1973 movie "Gordon's War" and 1984 John Sayles movie The Brother from Another Planet. In 1990, Gordon played the role of Doaker in August Wilson's The Piano Lesson, the fourth of 10 plays in his Pittsburgh Cycle. He also appeared on Broadway in the 1971 production of Ain't Supposed to Die a Natural Death, a musical by Melvin Van Peebles and a 2003 production of Ma Rainey's Black Bottom with his Roc co-star Charles S. Dutton and Whoopi Goldberg. He appeared on television in episodes of ER On the CBS TV show JAG as Chief Aubrey McBride in the 2002 episode "Port Chicago" and in episodes of Law & Order.

His most notable role was on the 1991–1994 Fox series Roc, about an African American family in Baltimore. Starring Dutton as Roc Emerson, the show included Gordon in the role of the title character's father Andrew, an "irascible, sharp-tongued retired train porter". Reviewer Marvin Kitman in Newsday described Gordon's character in Roc as a "black Archie Bunker". He gives portraits of Malcolm X as birthday presents. He is offended that his son watches The Simpsons because they're white and doesn't watch Cosby. Andrew also insists that Larry Bird can't possibly be white and play basketball as well as he does, that Bird was raised in Harlem and his real name is Abdul Mustafa. Gordon based his character on a strong-willed uncle who owned a grocery store in Philadelphia. Episodes in the second and third season of the show were broadcast live, which didn't faze Gordon, who described the experience as being "like going back to Broadway". The decision to air live shows was made as a promotional stunt, but was enabled by the extensive stage experience of Gordon, Dutton and other cast members.

Gordon died at age 78 on July 20, 2010, at his home in Jetersville, Virginia due to non-Hodgkin lymphoma. He was survived by his third wife, Jacqueline Alston-Gordon, as well as by five daughters, a son, nine grandchildren, and five great-grandchildren.

== Filmography ==
Year	Title	Role	Notes
1973	Gordon's War	Luther the Pimp	
1976	The Bingo Long Traveling All-Stars & Motor Kings	Mack, Potter's Goon	
1984	The Brother from Another Planet	Mr. Price	
1984	Violated	District Attorney	
1986	No Mercy	Lawrence	
1995	The Piano Lesson	Doaker	
1997	Better Than Ever	Hume	
2011	Somebody's Hero	Rusty	(final film role)
