= Malcolm Washington =

American filmmaker (born 1991)

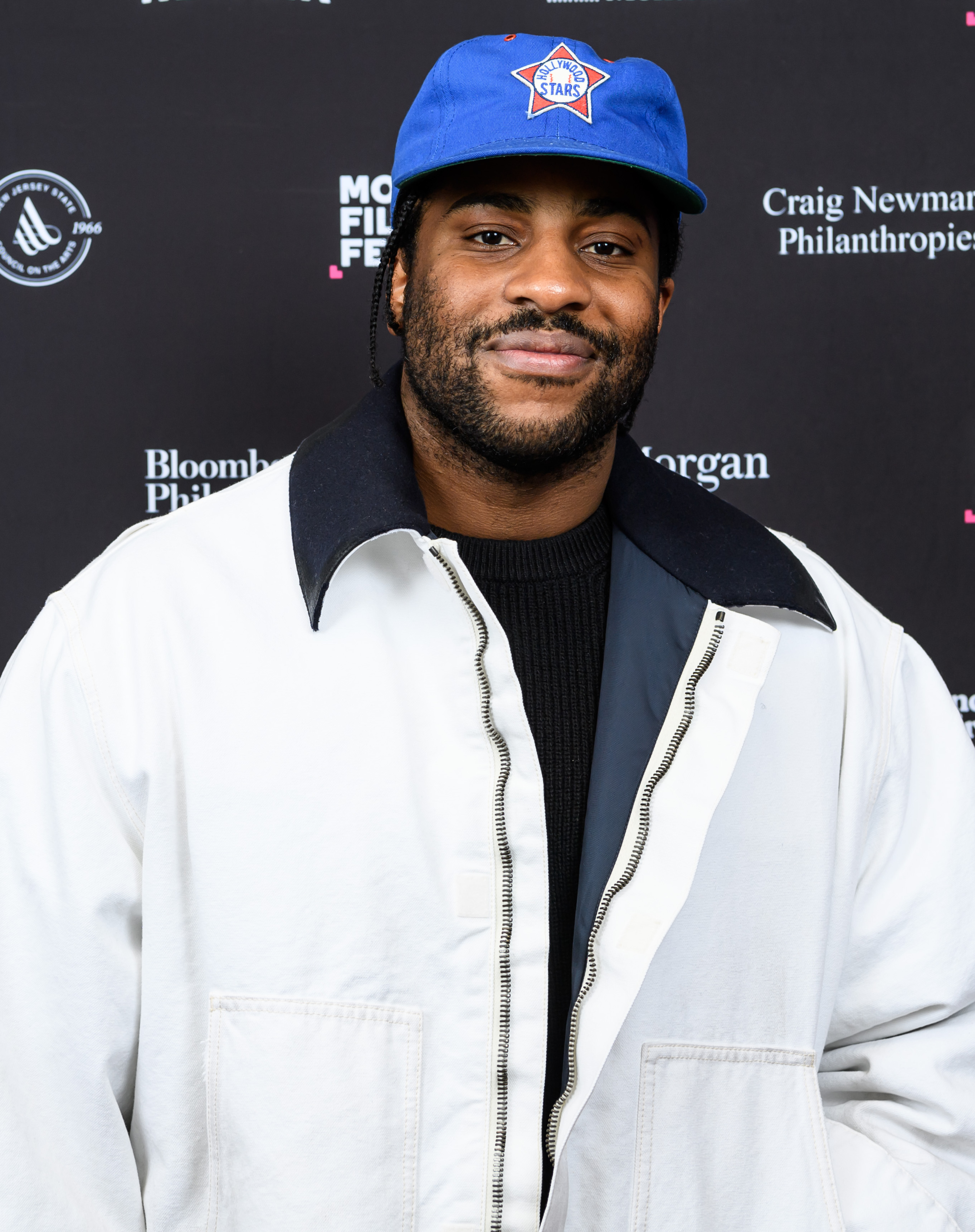
- Washington in 2024
- Born: April 10, 1991 (age 35); Los Angeles, California, U.S.
- Education: University of Pennsylvania; AFI Conservatory
- Occupations: Film producer, director, writer
- Years active: 2021–present
- Father: Denzel Washington
- Relatives: John David Washington (brother); Katia Washington (sister); Olivia Washington (twin sister)

Malcolm Washington (born April 10, 1991) is an American filmmaker. A son of actor Denzel Washington, he made his feature film directorial debut with The Piano Lesson (2024).

== Early life and background ==
Washington was born and raised in Los Angeles. He is the son of actors Pauletta (née Pearson) and Denzel Washington and the brother of John David Washington and Olivia Washington, the latter sibling is his twin sister. He also has an elder sister named Katia.

Washington attended the Windward School in Los Angeles, playing on the basketball team with Anthony Stover and Darius Morris. He attended the University of Pennsylvania, studying film and playing for the Quakers basketball team from 2009 to 2010. He graduated from Penn with a degree in film studies in 2013, and from the AFI Conservatory with a Master of Fine Arts degree in directing in 2016.

== Career ==
Washington made his feature directorial debut with the drama film The Piano Lesson (2024), an adaptation of the 1987 play by August Wilson, starring Samuel L. Jackson and his brother, John David. He was awarded the Breakthrough Award at the 60th Chicago International Film Festival. Washington was also honored with breakthrough director awards at the 32nd Hamptons International Film Festival and the 13th Montclair Film Festival. He, along with his father Denzel and producer Todd Black, has been nominated for the Independent Spirit Award for Best First Feature for The Piano Lesson.

== Filmography ==
- Chef (2014; production assistant)
- North Hollywood (2021; as producer)
- The Piano Lesson (2024; as writer and director)
