= The Piano Lesson (2024 film) =

American drama film

- Theatrical release poster
- Directed by: Malcolm Washington
- Screenplay by: Virgil Williams; Malcolm Washington
- Based on: The Piano Lesson by August Wilson
- Produced by: Denzel Washington; Todd Black
- Starring: Samuel L. Jackson; John David Washington; Ray Fisher; Michael Potts; Erykah Badu; Skylar Aleece Smith; Danielle Deadwyler; Corey Hawkins
- Cinematography: Mike Gioulakis
- Edited by: Leslie Jones
- Music by: Alexandre Desplat
- Production companies: Mundy Lane Entertainment; Escape Artists
- Distributed by: Netflix
- Release dates: August 31, 2024 (Telluride); November 8, 2024 (United States); November 22, 2024 (Netflix)
- Running time: 127 minutes
- Country: United States
- Language: English

The Piano Lesson is a 2024 American drama film directed by Malcolm Washington, who co-wrote the screenplay with Virgil Williams. It is an adaptation of the 1987 Pulitzer Prize-winning play by August Wilson. It stars an ensemble cast of Samuel L. Jackson, John David Washington, Ray Fisher, Michael Potts, Erykah Badu, Skylar Aleece Smith, Danielle Deadwyler, and Corey Hawkins.

The Piano Lesson premiered at the 51st Telluride Film Festival on August 31, 2024, and it was released in select theaters in the United States on November 8, 2024, before streaming on Netflix on November 22.

The film received generally positive reviews from critics. Deadwyler was lauded for her performance, earning nominations for the Critics' Choice Award and the Screen Actors Guild Award for Best Supporting Actress.

== Plot ==
In 1911, Boy Charles, father to Boy Willie and Berniece, steals the piano from the Sutter family, the former enslavers of the Charles family. The piano, intricately carved with faces of African ancestors, represents the family’s heritage and resilience. After giving his family a head start, Boy Charles attempts to flee via train boxcar. The Sutters catch up to him and burn the boxcar with him trapped inside.

In 1936, Boy Willie arrives in Pittsburgh with his friend Lymon, hauling a truckload of watermelons. James Sutter was murdered by being pushed down the well, and the Sutter family offered Boy Willie part of their Mississippi farmland as reparations for his father's death, and so Boy Willie is determined to sell the piano to purchase the last of the land. However, Berniece, who lives in Pittsburgh with her young daughter Maretha and their uncle Doaker, refuses to part with the piano, seeing it as a sacred artifact of their family history and a reminder of their struggles. Now dating local preacher Avery, Berniece is still estranged from Boy Willie after he and Lymon were involved in stealing wood that led to the death of her husband Crawley.

The siblings’ arguments bring to light the piano’s significance to their lives. Berniece insists on preserving the piano as a memorial, although she still resents when her mother forced her to play the piano against her will. Boy Willie views its sale as a means to reclaim their family’s autonomy. However he is still haunted from his father's words about the importance of owning his own land. Another uncle, Wining Boy, visits the family and laments his glory days.

Supernatural elements intensify the drama as Sutter's ghost begins to haunt the Charles household, particularly Berniece and Maretha. Berniece attributes the ghost’s presence to Boy Willie’s arrival and his disruptive intentions regarding the piano, as well as her suspicions that he killed Sutter. Boy Willie, however, disregards his sister's claims. Meanwhile, Lymon, seeking a fresh start, begins to develop feelings for Berniece.

Sutter's manifestations intensify, and his ghost attacks Boy Willie. Avery attempts to exorcise the house to no avail. Berniece decides to play the piano for the first time in years, calling upon her ancestors to exorcise Sutter's ghost and save her brother. Boy Willie, now believing his sister and reaching an understanding with her, advises her to continue playing the piano.

Boy Willie abandons his plans to sell the piano, and Berniece begins teaching Maretha how to play it. Boy Willie returns one last time to the Sutter farmland, now on public sale after failing to purchase it, and grasps the dirt like his father taught him before departing.

== Cast ==
- Samuel L. Jackson as Doaker
- John David Washington as Boy Willie
  - Isaiah Gunn as Young Boy Willie
- Danielle Deadwyler as Berniece
  - Kylee D. Allen as Young Berniece
- Ray Fisher as Lymon
- Corey Hawkins as Avery
- Michael Potts as Wining Boy
  - Tony Fox as Young Wining Boy
- Skylar Aleece Smith as Maretha
- Stephan James as Boy Charles
- Erykah Badu as Lucille
- Malik J. Ali as Willie Boy
- Charity Jordan as Mama Berniece
- Matrell Smith as Crawley
- Jerrika Hinton as Grace
- Gail Bean as Dolly
- Pauletta Washington as Mama Ola
  - Olivia Washington as Young Mama Ola
- Jay Peterson as James Sutter
- David Atkinson as Robert Sutter
- Melanie Jeffcoat as Miss Ophelia

== Production ==
=== Development and casting ===
In September 2015, Denzel Washington announced that he would produce film adaptations of all of August Wilson's plays from the Pittsburgh Cycle series. Fences and Ma Rainey's Black Bottom were released in 2016 and 2020 respectively.

It was announced in April 2023 that Malcolm Washington would make his feature directorial and screenwriting debut with the film, an adaptation of The Piano Lesson, with his brother John David Washington, Samuel L. Jackson, Ray Fisher, Danielle Deadwyler, Michael Potts, and Corey Hawkins starring. John David Washington, Jackson, Fisher and Potts reprise their roles from the 2022 stage production of the play. Denzel Washington produced the film with Todd Black. In May, singer Erykah Badu was announced to be making a cameo appearance in the film. Gail Bean, Jerrika Hinton, Stephan James, Malik J. Ali, Jay Peterson and Matrell Smith rounded out the cast in June 2023.

=== Filming ===
Filming began in Atlanta in April 2023. The Pittsburgh Film Office expressed disappointment that the production would not be filming in the city like previous Wilson adaptations.

=== Music ===
In July 2024, it was announced Alexandre Desplat would compose the original score for film. Washington described the film as having "a big Americana, pastoral element" and was curious what Desplat's take on it would be.

== Release ==
The film's world premiere took place at the Telluride Film Festival, prior to its international premiere as a special presentation at the 2024 Toronto International Film Festival.

The Piano Lesson was released in select theaters in the United States on November 8, 2024, before streaming on Netflix on November 22. The film debuted at #5 on Netflix's U.S. movie chart before settling at #6, showcasing strong audience interest.

== Reception ==
=== Critical response ===
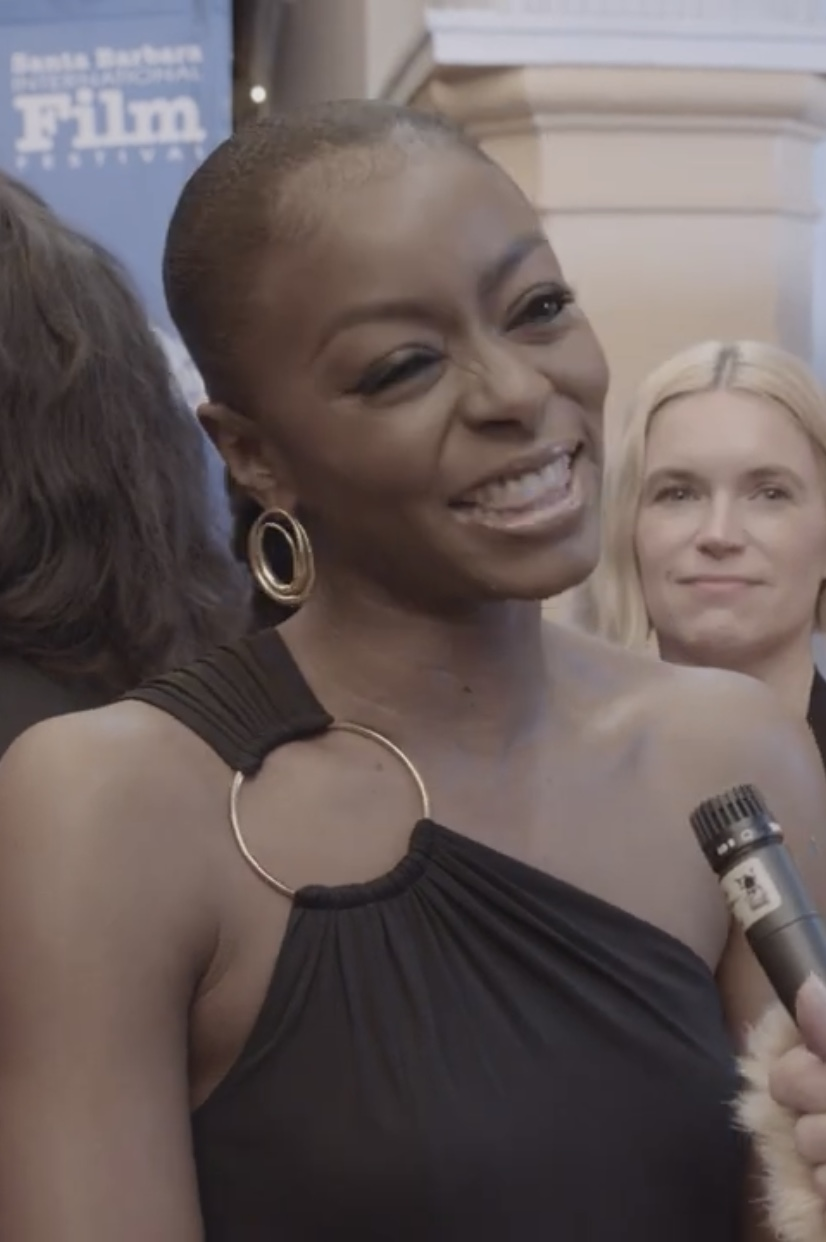
Danielle Deadwyler's performance in the film received critical acclaim.

On the review aggregator website Rotten Tomatoes, 88% of 133 critics' reviews are positive, with an average rating of 7.3/10. The website's consensus reads: "A Southern Gothic played at a ferocious key, The Piano Lesson brings August Wilson's words to vivid life with an outstanding ensemble." Metacritic, which uses a weighted average, assigned the film a score of 69 out of 100, based on 40 critics, indicating "generally favorable" reviews.

Zandra Odetunde for Time Out awarded 4 stars out of 5, praised the film and wrote: "The Piano Lesson strikes a perfect balance, showing us that the past isn’t just about trauma but is laced with moments of jubilance. It’s cathartic and moving – a reminder that strength and survival go hand in hand." Odeteunde further notes that Deadwyler is "Oscar-worthy". Peter Bradshaw of The Guardian gave it 3 out of 5 stars and wrote: "the ensemble cast work wonderfully and intuitively together; I loved the surges of emotion, and then the palate-cleansing moments of silence and calm. The song is a tremendous setpiece and the dialogue has a music of its own." Caleb Hammond, reviewing on the website Indiewire, gave the film a mixed response: "Malcolm Washington’s adaptation of The Piano Lesson is referential, often overly so, and while this version contains its fair share of standout sequences along with Oscar-ready performances, the film never fully coalesces into an effective, singular, emotional narrative."

In Vulture's list of the 17 Best Film Performances of 2024, Danielle Deadwyler was featured for her captivating portrayal of Berniece, which deeply resonated with audiences and critics. Writer Joe Reid praised her ability to channel "grit, sorrow, and regret into something bigger than her body." Kathleen Newman-Bremang of Refinery29 described Deadwyler’s work as "one of the most transcendent showcases of humanity I’ve seen on screen, ever." Additionally, W included Deadwyler in their Best Performances Issue for 2025, with Lynn Hirschberg commending her nuanced exploration of "grief, tradition, and the weight of generational trauma." In The Hollywood Reporter, Lovia Gyarkye highlighted Deadwyler’s immersive approach, writing that she "slips into her character’s skin with quiet ease" and uncovers a performance that is "often electric." Gyarkye further noted how Deadwyler delves into Berniece’s "rage, grief, and vulnerability" with transfixing precision. Oliver Jones of Observer admired her ability to "evoke complicated emotions that her character hardly knows what to do with," adding that she delivers her lines "as if she invented them on the spot." Similarly, Peter Travers of ABC News lauded Deadwyler’s mastery of subtle emotional expression, calling her performance "magnificent" for capturing "every nuance of feeling in Berniece."

=== Accolades ===
Award	Date of ceremony	Category	Recipient(s)	Result	Ref.
Hamptons International Film Festival	October 5, 2024	Breakthrough Director Award	Malcolm Washington	Honored	
Mill Valley Film Festival	October 5, 2024	MVFF Acting Award	Danielle Deadwyler	Won	
Middleburg Film Festival	October 20, 2024	Breakthrough Actor Award	Danielle Deadwyler	Honored	
Newport Beach Film Festival	October 20, 2024	Outstanding Performance Female	Danielle Deadwyler	Won	
Newport Beach Film Festival	October 20, 2024	Best U.S. Narrative	Malcolm Washington	Won	
SCAD Savannah Film Festival	October 26, 2024	Inaugural Ensemble Award	The cast of The Piano Lesson (Note: Samuel L. Jackson, John David Washington, Ray Fisher, Danielle Deadwyler, Michael Potts, Corey Hawkins and Erykah Badu.)	Honored	
Montclair Film Festival	October 27, 2024	Performance Award	John David Washington	Honored	
Montclair Film Festival	October 27, 2024	Breakthrough Director Award	Malcolm Washington	Honored	
Chicago International Film Festival	October 27, 2024	Breakthrough Award	Malcolm Washington	Honored	
Chicago International Film Festival	October 27, 2024	Spotlight Award	John David Washington	Honored	
Denver Film Festival	November 1, 2024	Excellence in Writing Award	Malcolm Washington and Virgil Williams	Honored	
Elle's Women in Hollywood Celebration	November 19, 2024	The Witness	Danielle Deadwyler	Honored	
Gotham Film Awards	December 2, 2024	Ensemble Tribute	The cast of The Piano Lesson	Honored	
Gotham Film Awards	December 2, 2024	Outstanding Supporting Performance	Danielle Deadwyler	Nominated	
Astra Film Awards	December 8, 2024	Best First Feature	Malcolm Washington	Nominated	
Astra Film Awards	December 8, 2024	Best Supporting Actress	Danielle Deadwyler	Nominated	
Boston Society of Film Critics	December 8, 2024	Best Supporting Actress	Danielle Deadwyler	Won	
Washington D.C. Area Film Critics Association	December 8, 2024	Best Supporting Actress	Danielle Deadwyler	Won	
Celebration of Cinema and Television	December 9, 2024	Actor Award – Film	John David Washington	Won	
San Diego Film Critics Society	December 9, 2024	Best Adapted Screenplay	Malcolm Washington and Virgil Williams	Nominated	
San Diego Film Critics Society	December 9, 2024	Best Supporting Actress	Danielle Deadwyler	Nominated	
SFFILM Awards	December 9, 2024	George Gund III Award for Virtuosity	Malcolm Washington	Honored	
Chicago Film Critics Association	December 12, 2024	Best Supporting Actress	Danielle Deadwyler	Nominated	
St. Louis Film Critics Association	December 15, 2024	Best First Feature Film	Malcolm Washington	Runner-up	
St. Louis Film Critics Association	December 15, 2024	Best Supporting Actress	Danielle Deadwyler	Nominated	
Indiana Film Journalists Association	December 16, 2024	Best Adapted Screenplay	Malcolm Washington and Virgil Williams	Nominated	
Indiana Film Journalists Association	December 16, 2024	Breakthrough of the Year	Malcolm Washington	Nominated	
Seattle Film Critics Society	December 16, 2024	Best Supporting Actress	Danielle Deadwyler	Nominated	
New York Film Critics Online	December 16, 2024	Best Supporting Actress	Danielle Deadwyler	Runner-up	
Dallas–Fort Worth Film Critics Association	December 18, 2024	Best Supporting Actress	Danielle Deadwyler	4th place	
Black Film Critics Circle	December 19, 2024	Best Supporting Actress	Danielle Deadwyler	Won	
Black Film Critics Circle	December 19, 2024	Rising Star/Best Newcomer	Malcolm Washington	Won	
Online Association of Female Film Critics	December 23, 2024	Best Acting Ensemble	The cast of The Piano Lesson	Nominated	
Online Association of Female Film Critics	December 23, 2024	Best Supporting Female	Danielle Deadwyler	Nominated	
Online Association of Female Film Critics	December 23, 2024	Breakthrough Filmmaker	Malcolm Washington	Nominated	
Columbus Film Critics Association	January 2, 2025	Best Ensemble	The cast of The Piano Lesson	Nominated	
Columbus Film Critics Association	January 2, 2025	Best Supporting Performance	Danielle Deadwyler	Runner-up	
North Carolina Film Critics Association	January 3, 2025	Directorial Debut	Malcolm Washington	Nominated	
Palm Springs International Film Festival	January 3, 2025	Directors to Watch	Malcolm Washington	Honored	
DiscussingFilm Global Critic Award	January 4, 2025	Best Debut Feature	Malcolm Washington	Nominated	
DiscussingFilm Global Critic Award	January 4, 2025	Best Supporting Actress	Danielle Deadwyler	Won	
Kansas City Film Critics Circle	January 4, 2025	Best Supporting Actress	Danielle Deadwyler	Runner-up	
Austin Film Critics Association	January 6, 2025	Best Supporting Actress	Danielle Deadwyler	Nominated	
Alliance Of Women Film Journalist EDA Award	January 7, 2025	Best Supporting Actress	Danielle Deadwyler	Nominated	
Georgia Film Critics Association	January 7, 2025	Best Supporting Actress	Danielle Deadwyler	Won	
Georgia Film Critics Association	January 7, 2025	Oglethorpe Award for Excellence in Georgia Cinema	Malcolm Washington, Virgil Williams and August Wilson	Nominated	
Utah Film Critics Association	January 11, 2025	Best Supporting Performance, Female	Danielle Deadwyler	Won	
Women Film Critics Circle	January 15, 2025	Best Supporting Actress	Danielle Deadwyler	Runner-up	
North American Film Critic Association	January 16, 2025	Best Streaming Film	The Piano Lesson	Nominated	
North American Film Critic Association	January 16, 2025	Best Supporting Actress	Danielle Deadwyler	Nominated	
Chicago Indie Critics Windie Award	January 17, 2025	Best Supporting Actress	Danielle Deadwyler	Nominated	
Girls On Film Awards	January 26, 2025	Best Performance in a Supporting Role	Danielle Deadwyler	Won	
Satellite Awards	January 26, 2025	Best Actress in a Supporting Role	Danielle Deadwyler	Nominated	
London Film Critics' Circle Awards	February 2, 2025	Supporting Actress of the Year	Danielle Deadwyler	Nominated	
Critics' Choice Movie Awards	February 7, 2025	Best Supporting Actress	Danielle Deadwyler	Nominated	
AARP Movies for Grownups Awards	February 8, 2025	Best Intergenerational Movie	The Piano Lesson	Nominated	
NBP Film Community Awards	February 10, 2025	Best Debut Director	Malcolm Washington	Nominated	
NBP Film Community Awards	February 10, 2025	Best Supporting Actress	Danielle Deadwyler	Nominated	
Black Reel Awards	February 17, 2025	Outstanding Film	Todd Black and Denzel Washington	Nominated	
Black Reel Awards	February 17, 2025	Outstanding Lead Performance	John David Washington	Nominated	
Black Reel Awards	February 17, 2025	Outstanding Supporting Performance	Danielle Deadwyler	Won	
Black Reel Awards	February 17, 2025	Outstanding Breakthrough Performance	Ray Fisher	Nominated	
Black Reel Awards	February 17, 2025	Outstanding Ensemble	Lindsay Graham and Mary Vernieu	Won	
Black Reel Awards	February 17, 2025	Outstanding Director	Malcolm Washington	Nominated	
Black Reel Awards	February 17, 2025	Outstanding Emerging Director	Malcolm Washington	Nominated	
Black Reel Awards	February 17, 2025	Outstanding First Screenplay	Malcolm Washington	Nominated	
Black Reel Awards	February 17, 2025	Outstanding Screenplay	Malcolm Washington and Virgil Williams	Nominated	
Black Reel Awards	February 17, 2025	Outstanding Costume Design	Francine Jamison-Tanchuck	Nominated	
Black Reel Awards	February 17, 2025	Outstanding Hairstyling and Makeup	Lawrence Davis & Jenny Garner	Won	
Black Reel Awards	February 17, 2025	Outstanding Production Design	David J. Bomba, Chardae Adams and Patrick Cassidy	Won	
NBP Film Award	February 17, 2025	Best Debut Director	Malcolm Washington	Nominated	
NBP Film Award	February 17, 2025	Best Supporting Actress	Danielle Deadwyler	Nominated	
African-American Film Critics Association	February 19, 2025	Top 10 Films of the Year	The Piano Lesson	3rd place	
African-American Film Critics Association	February 19, 2025	Best Supporting Actress	Danielle Deadwyler	Won	
African-American Film Critics Association	February 19, 2025	Best Ensemble	The cast of The Piano Lesson	Won	
African-American Film Critics Association	February 19, 2025	Breakout Performance Award	Ray Fisher	Honored	
African-American Film Critics Association	February 19, 2025	Emerging Director Award	Malcolm Washington	Honored	
Film Independent Spirit Awards	February 22, 2025	Best First Feature	Todd Black, Denzel Washington and Malcolm Washington	Nominated	
Film Independent Spirit Awards	February 22, 2025	Best Supporting Performance	Danielle Deadwyler	Nominated	
NAACP Image Awards	February 22, 2025	Outstanding Motion Picture	The Piano Lesson	Nominated	
NAACP Image Awards	February 22, 2025	Outstanding Actor in a Motion Picture	John David Washington	Nominated	
NAACP Image Awards	February 22, 2025	Outstanding Supporting Actor in a Motion Picture	Corey Hawkins	Nominated	
NAACP Image Awards	February 22, 2025	Outstanding Supporting Actor in a Motion Picture	Samuel L. Jackson	Nominated	
NAACP Image Awards	February 22, 2025	Outstanding Supporting Actress in a Motion Picture	Danielle Deadwyler	Nominated	
NAACP Image Awards	February 22, 2025	Outstanding Breakthrough Performance in a Motion Picture	Danielle Deadwyler	Nominated	
NAACP Image Awards	February 22, 2025	Outstanding Ensemble Cast in a Motion Picture	The cast of The Piano Lesson	Nominated	
NAACP Image Awards	February 22, 2025	Outstanding Breakthrough Creative (Motion Picture)	Malcolm Washington	Won	
NAACP Image Awards	February 22, 2025	Outstanding Youth Performance in a Motion Picture	Skylar Aleece Smith	Won	
NAACP Image Awards	February 22, 2025	Outstanding Writing in a Motion Picture	Malcolm Washington and Virgil Williams	Nominated	
NAACP Image Awards	February 22, 2025	Outstanding Directing in a Motion Picture	Malcolm Washington	Nominated	
NAACP Image Awards	February 22, 2025	Outstanding Costume Design (Television or Film)	Francine Jamison-Tanchuck	Nominated	
NAACP Image Awards	February 22, 2025	Outstanding Make-up (Television or Film)	Para Malden	Nominated	
NAACP Image Awards	February 22, 2025	Outstanding Hairstyling (Television or Film)	Andrea Mona Bowman	Nominated	
Guild of Music Supervisors Awards	February 23, 2025	Best Music Supervision in Mid-Level Budget Films	Deva Anderson and Rachel Lautzenheiser	Nominated	
Online Film & Television Association	February 23, 2025	Best First Feature	Malcolm Washington	Nominated	
Screen Actors Guild Awards	February 23, 2025	Outstanding Performance by a Female Actor in a Supporting Role	Danielle Deadwyler	Nominated	
BET Awards	June 9, 2025	Best Movie	The Piano Lesson	Nominated	
