= List of accolades received by BlacKkKlansman =

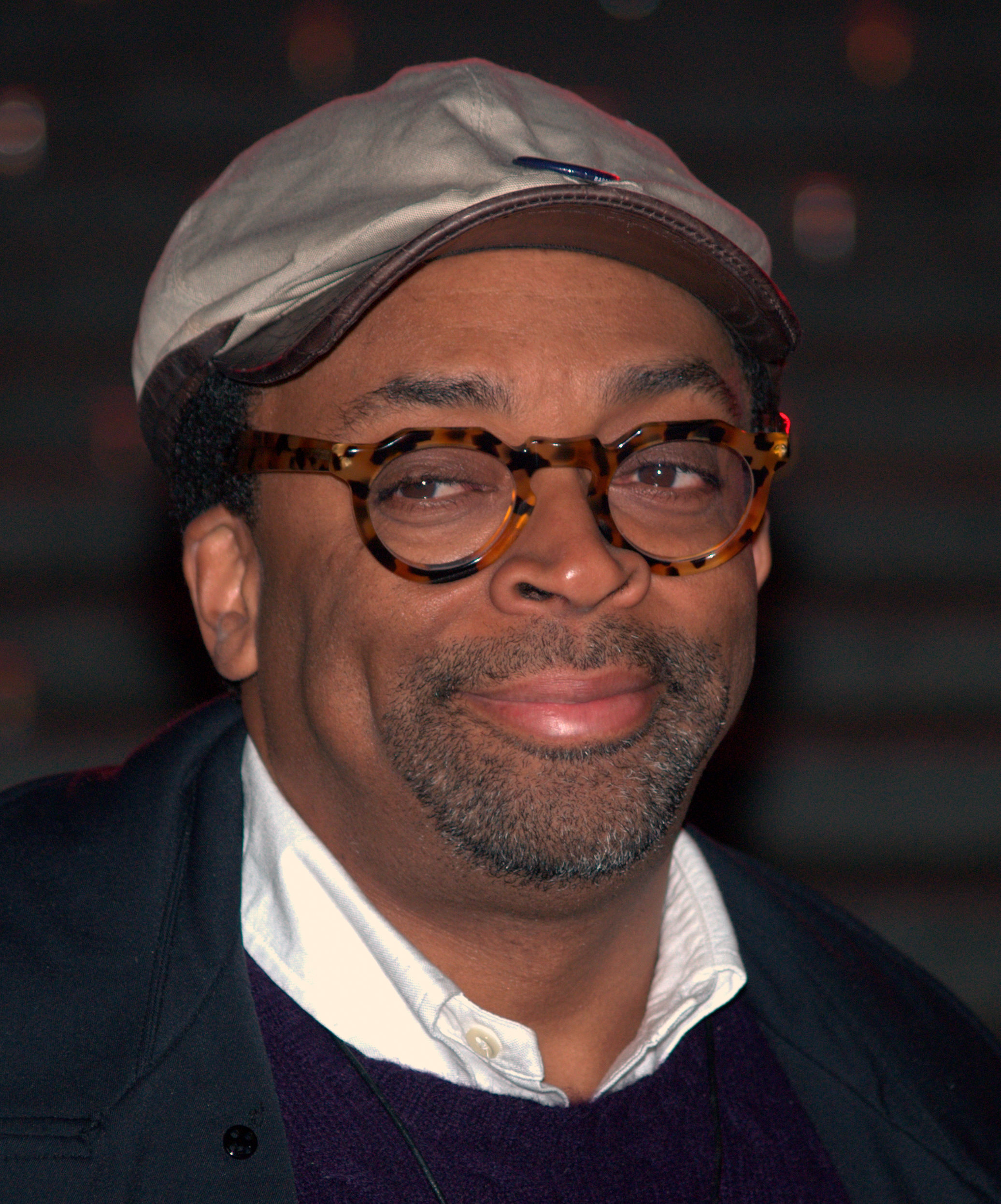
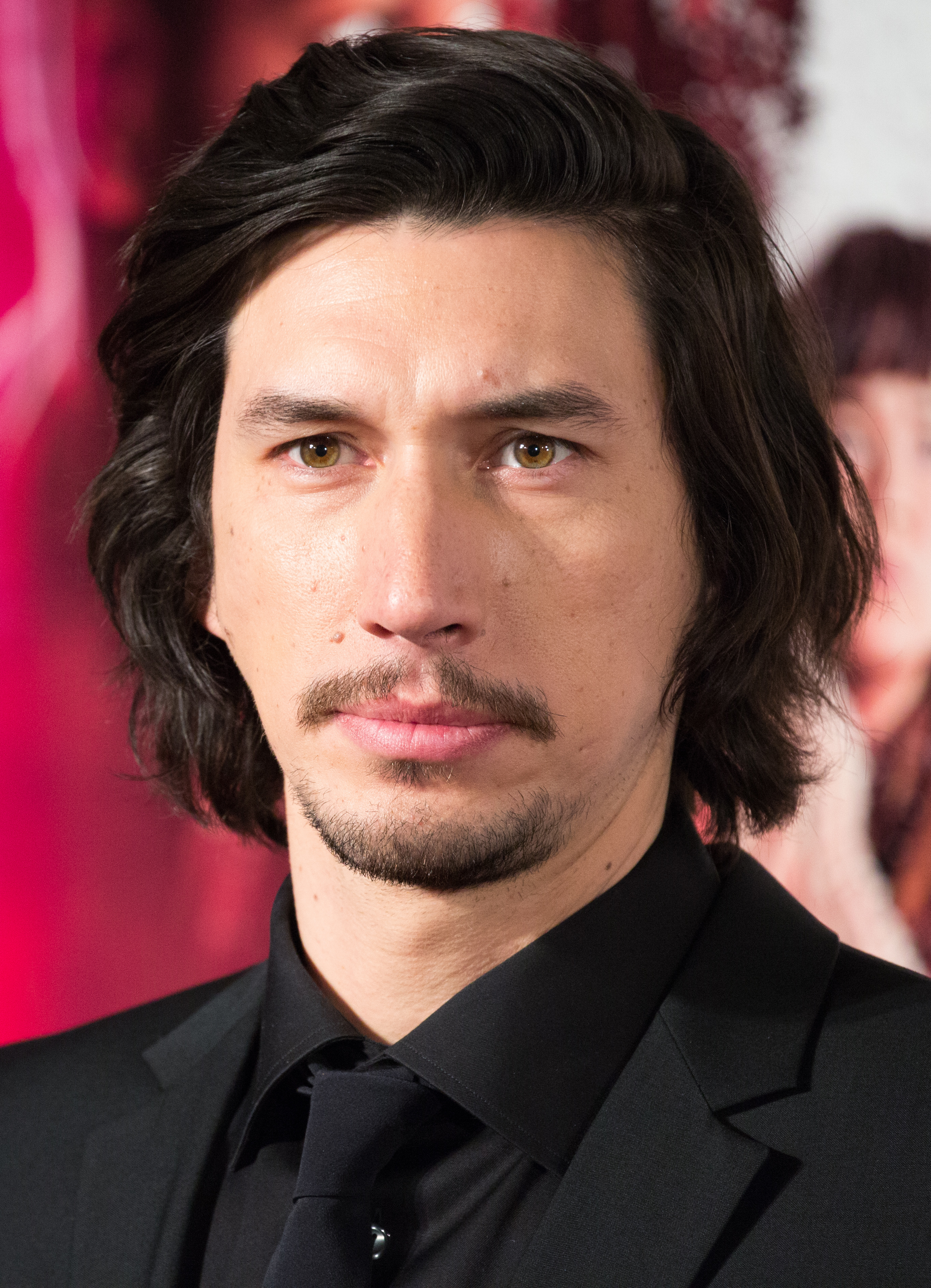
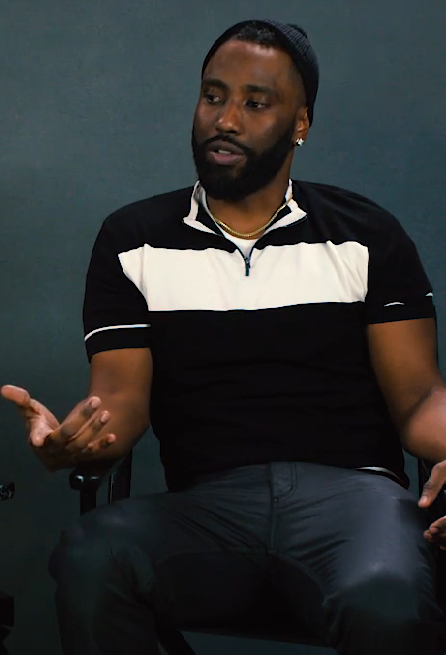
- Spike Lee (left) received acclaim for his direction and screenplay, and Adam Driver (middle) and John David Washington (right) for their performances.
Accolades
Award	Wins	Nominations
AACTA International Awards	0	3
AARP's Movies for Grownups Awards	0	4
Academy Awards	1	6
African-American Film Critics Association	2	2
Alliance of Women Film Journalists	0	5
American Cinema Editors Awards	0	1
American Film Institute Awards	1	1
Austin Film Critics Association	0	1
Black Reel Awards	0	11
British Academy Film Awards	1	5
Cannes Film Festival	2	2
Chicago Film Critics Association	0	2
Critics' Choice Movie Awards	0	4
Dallas–Fort Worth Film Critics Association	2	2
Detroit Film Critics Society	0	1
Directors Guild of America	0	1
Dublin Film Critics' Circle	4	4
Golden Globe Awards	0	4
Gotham Awards	0	1
Grande Prêmio do Cinema Brasileiro	0	1
Guldbagge Awards	0	1
Hollywood Film Awards	1	1
Hollywood Music in Media Awards	0	1
Houston Film Critics Society	1	3
Independent Spirit Awards	0	1
IndieWire Critics Poll	2	2
Locarno International Film Festival	1	1
London Film Critics' Circle	0	3
New York Film Critics Online	1	1
Online Film Critics Society	1	5
Palm Springs International Film Festival	1	1
People's Choice Awards	0	2
Producers Guild of America	0	1
San Francisco Film Critics Circle	3	5
Satellite Awards	1	7
Screen Actors Guild Awards	0	3
Seattle Film Critics Society	0	1
St. Louis Film Critics Association	3	6
Washington D.C. Area Film Critics Association	0	1
Writers Guild of America Awards	0	1

Totals (Note: Certain award groups do not simply award one winner. They acknowledge several different recipients, have runners-up, and have third place. Since this is a specific recognition and is different from losing an award, runner-up mentions are considered wins in this award tally. For simplification and to avoid errors, each award in this list has been presumed to have had a prior nomination.)
- Wins: 28
- Nominations: 108

BlacKkKlansman is a 2018 American biographical comedy-drama film directed by Spike Lee and written by Charlie Wachtel, David Rabinowitz, Kevin Willmott, and Lee, based on the 2014 memoir Black Klansman by Ron Stallworth, the first African-American detective in the city's police department who infiltrated and exposed the local chapter of the Ku Klux Klan in the 1970s. Produced by Lee, Raymond Mansfield, Shaun Redick, Sean McKittrick, Jason Blum, and Jordan Peele, the film stars John David Washington as Stallworth, along with Adam Driver, Laura Harrier, and Topher Grace.

BlacKkKlansman premiered on May 14, 2018, at the Cannes Film Festival, where it won the Grand Prix. It was theatrically released in the United States on August 10, 2018, coinciding with the one-year anniversary of the white supremacist Unite the Right rally.

The film has grossed $88.2 million worldwide, and received acclaim from critics, with critics praising the performances (particularly of Washington and Driver) and timely themes, as well as noting it as a return to form for Lee. At the 76th Golden Globe Awards, it earned four nominations; Best Motion Picture – Drama, Best Director for Lee, Best Actor – Drama for Washington and Best Supporting Actor for Driver. At the 24th Critics' Choice Awards, the film received four nominations for Best Picture, Best Director for Lee, Best Supporting Actor for Driver, and Best Adapted Screenplay. In addition, the American Film Institute selected it as one of the top 10 films of 2018.

== Accolades ==
Award	Date of ceremony	Category	Recipient(s)	Result	Ref.
AACTA International Awards	January 4, 2019	Best Film	BlacKkKlansman	Nominated	
AACTA International Awards	January 4, 2019	Best Direction	Spike Lee	Nominated	
AACTA International Awards	January 4, 2019	Best Screenplay	Charlie Wachtel, David Rabinowitz, Kevin Willmott, Spike Lee	Nominated	
AARP's Movies for Grownups Awards	February 4, 2019	Best Movie for Grownups	BlacKkKlansman	Nominated	
AARP's Movies for Grownups Awards	February 4, 2019	Best Director	Spike Lee	Won	
AARP's Movies for Grownups Awards	February 4, 2019	Best Time Capsule	BlacKkKlansman	Nominated	
AARP's Movies for Grownups Awards	February 4, 2019	Readers' Choice Poll	BlacKkKlansman	Nominated	
Academy Awards	February 24, 2019	Best Picture	Sean McKittrick, Jason Blum, Raymond Mansfield, Jordan Peele and Spike Lee	Nominated	
Academy Awards	February 24, 2019	Best Director	Spike Lee	Nominated	
Academy Awards	February 24, 2019	Best Supporting Actor	Adam Driver	Nominated	
Academy Awards	February 24, 2019	Best Adapted Screenplay	Charlie Wachtel & David Rabinowitz and Kevin Willmott & Spike Lee	Won	
Academy Awards	February 24, 2019	Best Film Editing	Barry Alexander Brown	Nominated	
Academy Awards	February 24, 2019	Best Original Score	Terence Blanchard	Nominated	
African-American Film Critics Association	December 11, 2018	Best Screenplay	Spike Lee, David Rabinowitz, Charlie Wachtel, Kevin Willmott	Won	
African-American Film Critics Association	December 11, 2018	Best Actor	John David Washington	Won	
Alliance of Women Film Journalists	January 10, 2019	Best Film	BlacKkKlansman	Nominated	
Alliance of Women Film Journalists	January 10, 2019	Best Director	Spike Lee	Nominated	
Alliance of Women Film Journalists	January 10, 2019	Best Adapted Screenplay	Spike Lee, David Rabinowitz, Charlie Wachtel, Kevin Willmott	Nominated	
Alliance of Women Film Journalists	January 10, 2019	Best Supporting Actor	Adam Driver	Nominated	
Alliance of Women Film Journalists	January 10, 2019	Best Casting Director	Kim Coleman	Nominated	
American Cinema Editors Awards	February 1, 2019	Best Edited Feature Film – Dramatic	Barry Alexander Brown	Nominated	
American Film Institute	January 4, 2019	Top 10 Films of the Year	BlacKkKlansman	Won	
Austin Film Critics Association	January 7, 2019	Best Adapted Screenplay	Spike Lee, David Rabinowitz, Charlie Wachtel, Kevin Willmott	Nominated	
Black Reel Awards	February 7, 2019	Outstanding Motion Picture	BlacKkKlansman	Nominated	
Black Reel Awards	February 7, 2019	Outstanding Actor	John David Washington	Nominated	
Black Reel Awards	February 7, 2019	Outstanding Director	Spike Lee	Nominated	
Black Reel Awards	February 7, 2019	Outstanding Screenplay	Charlie Wachtel, David Rabinowitz, Kevin Willmott, Spike Lee	Nominated	
Black Reel Awards	February 7, 2019	Outstanding Ensemble	BlacKkKlansman	Nominated	
Black Reel Awards	February 7, 2019	Outstanding Score	Terence Blanchard	Nominated	
Black Reel Awards	February 7, 2019	Outstanding Breakthrough Performance, Male	John David Washington	Nominated	
Black Reel Awards	February 7, 2019	Outstanding Breakthrough Performance, Female	Laura Harrier	Nominated	
Black Reel Awards	February 7, 2019	Outstanding Cinematography	Chayse Irvin	Nominated	
Black Reel Awards	February 7, 2019	Outstanding Costume Design	Marci Rodgers	Nominated	
Black Reel Awards	February 7, 2019	Outstanding Production Design	Curt Beech	Nominated	
British Academy Film Awards	February 10, 2019	Best Film	Jason Blum, Spike Lee, Raymond Mansfield, Sean McKittrick, Jordan Peele	Nominated	
British Academy Film Awards	February 10, 2019	Best Director	Spike Lee	Nominated	
British Academy Film Awards	February 10, 2019	Best Actor in a Supporting Role	Adam Driver	Nominated	
British Academy Film Awards	February 10, 2019	Best Adapted Screenplay	Charlie Wachtel, David Rabinowitz, Kevin Willmott, Spike Lee	Won	
British Academy Film Awards	February 10, 2019	Best Original Music	Terence Blanchard	Nominated	
Cannes Film Festival	May 19, 2018	Palme d'Or	Spike Lee	Nominated	
Cannes Film Festival	May 19, 2018	Grand Prix	Spike Lee	Won	
Cannes Film Festival	May 19, 2018	Prize of the Ecumenical Jury - Special Mention	Spike Lee	Won	
Chicago Film Critics Association	December 8, 2018	Best Adapted Screenplay	Spike Lee, David Rabinowitz, Charlie Wachtel, Kevin Willmott	Nominated	
Chicago Film Critics Association	December 8, 2018	Most Promising Performer	John David Washington	Nominated	
Critics' Choice Awards	January 13, 2019	Best Picture	BlacKkKlansman	Nominated	
Critics' Choice Awards	January 13, 2019	Best Director	Spike Lee	Nominated	
Critics' Choice Awards	January 13, 2019	Best Supporting Actor	Adam Driver	Nominated	
Critics' Choice Awards	January 13, 2019	Best Adapted Screenplay	Charlie Wachtel, David Rabinowitz, Kevin Willmott, Spike Lee	Nominated	
Dallas–Fort Worth Film Critics Association	December 17, 2018	Best Picture	BlacKkKlansman	5th Place	
Dallas–Fort Worth Film Critics Association	December 17, 2018	Best Director	Spike Lee	4th Place	
Detroit Film Critics Society	December 3, 2018	Best Actor	John David Washington	Nominated	
Directors Guild of America	February 2, 2019	Feature Film	Spike Lee	Nominated	
Dublin Film Critics' Circle	December 20, 2018	Best Film	BlacKkKlansman	6th Place	
Dublin Film Critics' Circle	December 20, 2018	Best Director	Spike Lee	8th Place	
Dublin Film Critics' Circle	December 20, 2018	Best Screenplay	Charlie Wachtel, David Rabinowitz, Kevin Willmott, Spike Lee	6th Place	
Dublin Film Critics' Circle	December 20, 2018	Best Actor	John David Washington	5th Place	
Golden Globes	January 6, 2019	Best Motion Picture – Drama	BlacKkKlansman	Nominated	
Golden Globes	January 6, 2019	Best Director	Spike Lee	Nominated	
Golden Globes	January 6, 2019	Best Actor – Drama	John David Washington	Nominated	
Golden Globes	January 6, 2019	Best Supporting Actor	Adam Driver	Nominated	
Gotham Awards	November 26, 2018	Best Actor	Adam Driver	Nominated	
Grande Prêmio do Cinema Brasileiro	August 14, 2019	Best Foreign Feature Film	BlacKkKlansman	Won	
Guldbagge Awards	January 28, 2019	Best Foreign Film	Spike Lee	Nominated	
Hollywood Film Awards	November 4, 2018	Breakthrough Actor	John David Washington	Won	
Hollywood Music in Media Awards	November 14, 2018	Original Score – Feature Film	Terence Blanchard	Nominated	
Houston Film Critics Society	January 3, 2019	Best Picture	BlacKkKlansman	Nominated	
Houston Film Critics Society	January 3, 2019	Best Supporting Actor	Adam Driver	Nominated	
Houston Film Critics Society	January 3, 2019	Best Poster	BlacKkKlansman	Won	
Image Awards	March 2019	Outstanding Motion Picture	BlacKkKlansman	Nominated	
Image Awards	March 2019	Outstanding Actor	John David Washington	Nominated	
Image Awards	March 2019	Outstanding Independent Motion Picture	BlacKkKlansman	Nominated	
Image Awards	March 2019	Outstanding Breakthrough Performance	John David Washington	Nominated	
Image Awards	March 2019	Outstanding Writing	Spike Lee, David Rabinowitz, Kevin Willmott, Charlie Wachtel	Nominated	
Image Awards	March 2019	Outstanding Directing	Spike Lee	Nominated	
Independent Spirit Awards	February 23, 2019	Best Supporting Male	Adam Driver	Nominated	
IndieWire Critics Poll	December 17, 2018	Best Film	BlacKkKlansman	7th Place	
IndieWire Critics Poll	December 17, 2018	Best Supporting Actor	Adam Driver	4th Place	
Locarno International Film Festival	August 11, 2018	Audience Award	Spike Lee	Won	
Location Managers Guild Awards	September 21, 2019	Outstanding Locations in Period Film	Tim Stacker	Nominated	
London Film Critics' Circle	January 20, 2019	Film of the Year	BlacKkKlansman	Nominated	
London Film Critics' Circle	January 20, 2019	Supporting Actor of the Year	Adam Driver	Nominated	
London Film Critics' Circle	January 20, 2019	Technical Achievement	Marci Rodgers	Nominated	
New York Film Critics Online	December 9, 2018	Top 10 Films	BlacKkKlansman	Won	
Online Film Critics Society	January 2, 2019	Best Picture	BlacKkKlansman	2nd Place	
Online Film Critics Society	January 2, 2019	Best Director	Spike Lee	Nominated	
Online Film Critics Society	January 2, 2019	Best Actor	John David Washington	Nominated	
Online Film Critics Society	January 2, 2019	Best Supporting Actor	Adam Driver	Nominated	
Online Film Critics Society	January 2, 2019	Best Adapted Screenplay	Spike Lee, David Rabinowitz, Kevin Willmott, Charlie Wachtel	Nominated	
Palm Springs International Film Festival	January 3, 2019	Career Achievement Award	Spike Lee	Won	
People's Choice Awards	November 11, 2018	Drama Movie of 2018	BlacKkKlansman	Nominated	
People's Choice Awards	November 11, 2018	Drama Movie Star of 2018	John David Washington	Nominated	
Producers Guild of America	January 19, 2019	Best Theatrical Motion Picture	Sean McKittrick, Jason Blum, Raymond Mansfield, Jordan Peele, Spike Lee	Nominated	
San Francisco Film Critics Circle	December 9, 2018	Best Picture	BlacKkKlansman	Nominated	
San Francisco Film Critics Circle	December 9, 2018	Best Director	Spike Lee	Won	
San Francisco Film Critics Circle	December 9, 2018	Best Supporting Actor	Adam Driver	Nominated	
San Francisco Film Critics Circle	December 9, 2018	Best Adapted Screenplay	Spike Lee, David Rabinowitz, Kevin Willmott, Charlie Wachtel	Won	
San Francisco Film Critics Circle	December 9, 2018	Best Original Score	Terence Blanchard	Won	
Satellite Awards	February 17, 2019	Best Independent Film	BlacKkKlansman	Won	
Satellite Awards	February 17, 2019	Best Director	Spike Lee	Nominated	
Satellite Awards	February 17, 2019	Best Actor - Motion Picture, Comedy/Musical	John David Washington	Nominated	
Satellite Awards	February 17, 2019	Best Supporting Actor	Adam Driver	Nominated	
Satellite Awards	February 17, 2019	Best Adapted Screenplay	Spike Lee, David Rabinowitz, Kevin Wilmott, Charlie Wachtel	Nominated	
Satellite Awards	February 17, 2019	Best Film Editing	Barry Alexander Brown	Nominated	
Satellite Awards	February 17, 2019	Best Original Score	Terence Blanchard	Nominated	
Screen Actors Guild Awards	January 27, 2019	Outstanding Performance by a Male Actor in a Leading Role	John David Washington	Nominated	
Screen Actors Guild Awards	January 27, 2019	Outstanding Performance by a Male Actor in a Supporting Role	Adam Driver	Nominated	
Screen Actors Guild Awards	January 27, 2019	Outstanding Performance by a Cast in a Motion Picture	Harry Belafonte, Adam Driver, Topher Grace, Laura Harrier, Corey Hawkins and John David Washington	Nominated	
Seattle Film Critics Society	December 17, 2018	Best Film Editing	Barry Alexander Brown	Nominated	
St. Louis Film Critics Association	December 16, 2018	Best Film	BlacKkKlansman	Nominated	
St. Louis Film Critics Association	December 16, 2018	Best Director	Spike Lee	Won	
St. Louis Film Critics Association	December 16, 2018	Best Adapted Screenplay	Charlie Wachtel, David Rabinowitz, Kevin Willmott, Spike Lee	Won	
St. Louis Film Critics Association	December 16, 2018	Best Score	Terence Blanchard	Won	
St. Louis Film Critics Association	December 16, 2018	Best Soundtrack	BlacKkKlansman	Nominated	
St. Louis Film Critics Association	December 16, 2018	Best Scene	Final montage	Nominated	
Washington D.C. Area Film Critics Association	December 3, 2018	Best Adapted Screenplay	Charlie Wachtel, David Rabinowitz, Kevin Willmott, Spike Lee	Nominated	
Writers Guild of America Awards	February 17, 2019	Best Adapted Screenplay	Spike Lee, David Rabinowitz, Charlie Wachtel and Kevin Willmott	Nominated	

== See also ==
- 2018 in film
