= Herminie, Pennsylvania =

Unincorporated community in Pennsylvania, US

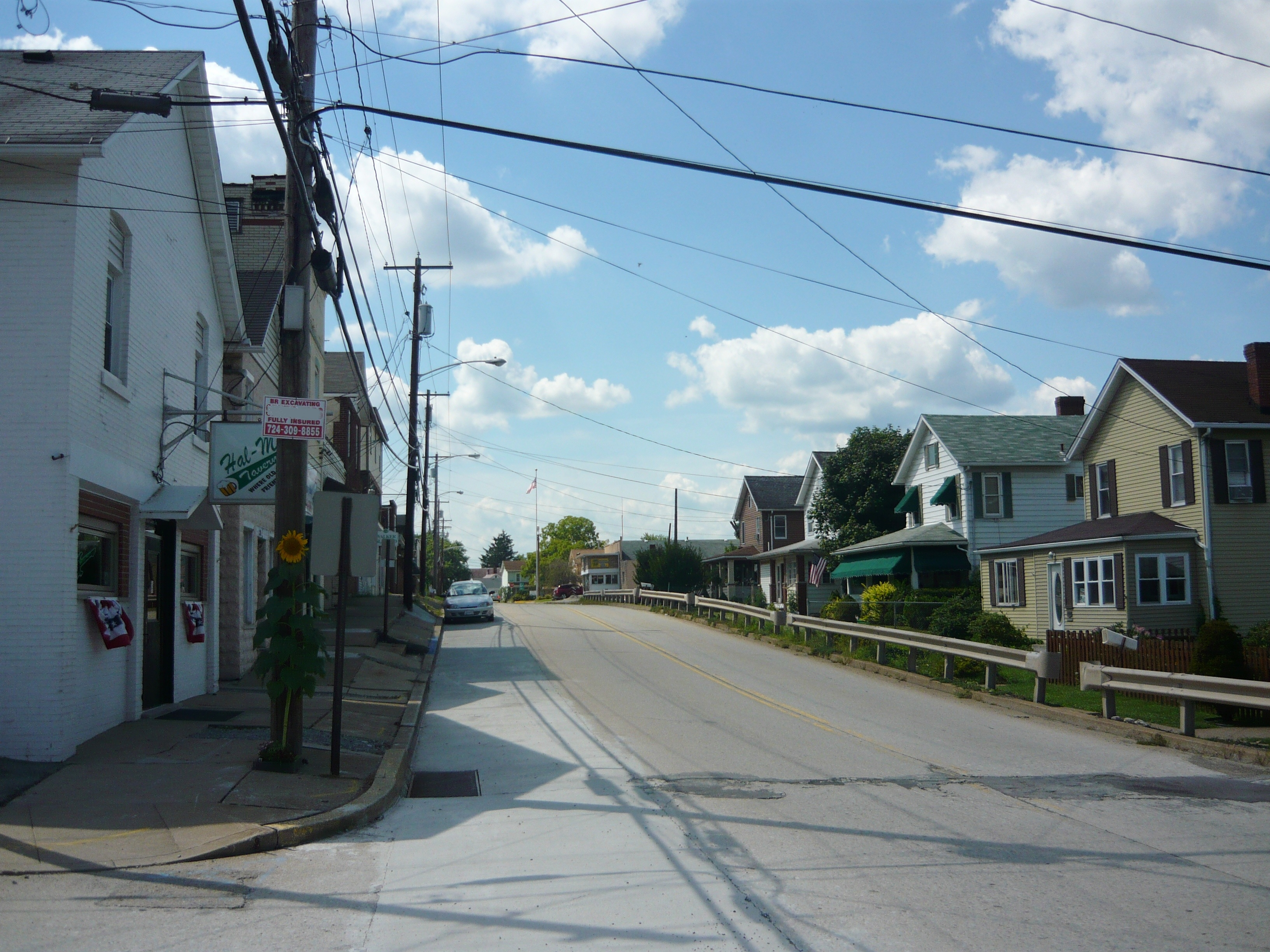
Herminie's business district Sewickley Avenue

Herminie is a census-designated place (CDP) in Sewickley Township, Pennsylvania, United States. The population was 718 at the 2020 census.

== History ==
Herminie (pronounced hurr-many) is named for Herminie Berwind, whose husband, Charles Berwind, was President of the Ocean Coal Company. The first mine at Herminie, known as the "Ocean No. 1 Mine," was opened in 1893 by Berwind-White Coal Company, of which Ocean Coal Company was a subsidiary. Fifty double houses were built for miners, plus five single-family houses for managers on Church Street. By 1900, the mine employed 271 people.

Herminie was the scene of two major strikes. During the Westmoreland County Coal Strike of 1910–1911, miners were evicted from company-owned houses, which were used to house strikebreakers, predominantly southern Blacks. The strike was unsuccessful from the strikers' perspective. Another strike, this in 1922, resulted in recognition of the United Mine Workers union.

Ocean No. 1 Mine closed in 1938 due to water problems, although other mines in the nearby area continued operating.

Featured in the documentary, Liquid Assets, about the lack of sewage infrastructure in the town.

=== 1974 Herminie auto-truck collision ===
At approximately 8:30 PM on Saturday, March 16, 1974, seven young men who were all classmates at the town's Sewickley High School were riding in a compact car when as their driver attempted to negotiate a curve at an excessive rate of speed, he lost control of his vehicle, skidded onto the berm and crashed through a pair of guard rails before skidding sideways on a downgrade into the oncoming path of a pickup truck that was carrying five young people.

Five of the victims were declared dead at the scene of the accident while a sixth victim succumbed to complications of his injuries the following day at a nearby hospital. While only one teenage boy from the car became the sole survivor, all five people from the pickup truck survived after being taken to the same hospital as the sixth victim. The county's second-worst vehicular accident in its history sent shockwaves across Pennsylvania and across the country.

Following an investigation made and concluded by the Greensburg and Herminie Police Departments, the primary cause of the accident was due to the driver's failure of judgment via overcrowding the vehicle, not wearing seat belts, failing to negotiate a curve and speeding.

== Geography ==
Herminie is located at 40°15′47″N 79°42′53″W.

According to the United States Census Bureau, the CDP has a total area of 0.24 square miles (0.62 km^{2}), all land.

== Demographics ==
The 2020 United States census reported that Herminie had a population of 718. The population density was 2,954.7 inhabitants per square mile (1,140.8/km^{2}). The racial makeup of Herminie was 682 (95.0%) White, 1 (0.1%) African American, 2 (0.3%) Native American, 1 (0.1%) Asian, 0 (0.0%) Pacific Islander, 3 (0.4%) from other races, and 29 (4.0%) from two or more races. Hispanic or Latino of any race were 5 persons (0.7%).

The whole population lived in households. There were 314 households, out of which 85 (27.1%) had children under the age of 18 living in them, 128 (40.8%) were married-couple households, 26 (8.3%) were cohabiting couple households, 79 (25.2%) had a female householder with no partner present, and 81 (25.8%) had a male householder with no partner present. 96 households (30.6%) were one person, and 38 (12.1%) were one person aged 65 or older. The average household size was 2.29. There were 198 families (63.1% of all households).

The age distribution was 174 people (24.2%) under the age of 18, 54 people (7.5%) aged 18 to 24, 192 people (26.7%) aged 25 to 44, 187 people (26.0%) aged 45 to 64, and 111 people (15.5%) who were 65 years of age or older. The median age was 39.7 years. For every 100 females, there were 94.1 males.

There were 387 housing units at an average density of 1,592.6 units per square mile (614.9 units/km^{2}), of which 314 (81.1%) were occupied. Of these, 225 (71.7%) were owner-occupied, and 89 (28.3%) were occupied by renters.

In 2000, the median household income was $24,258; and the median family income was $29,583. Males had a median income of $31,786 versus $15,781 for females. The per capita income for the CDP was $14,988. About 10.0 percent of families and 17.2 percent of the population were below the poverty line, including 15.3 percent of those under age eighteen, and 22.1 percent of those age sixty-five or older.

== Notable people ==
- Sonny Clark (1931–1963), was an American jazz pianist and composer.
- LTC Anthony B. Herbert, (1930–2014) was a United States Army officer, who served in both the Korean War and the Vietnam War.
- Ernie Hefferle, (1915–2000) was a football player and coach. He served as head football coach at Boston College interim head coach for the New Orleans Saints.
- Lt Joe Kenda (ret.), (b 1946) former Colorado Springs Police Department homicide detective, and star of the Investigation Discovery television show Homicide Hunter.
