= Black Reel Award for Outstanding Costume Design =

Award presented annually by the Black Reel Awards

- Awarded for: Outstanding Cinematography
- Country: United States
- Presented by: Black Reel Awards (BRAs)
- First award: Black Reel Awards of 2019
- Most recent winner: Antoinette Messam; The Harder They Fall (Black Reel Awards of 2022)
- Website: blackreelawards.com

This article lists the winners and nominees for the Black Reel Award for Outstanding Costume Design. The award is given to the costume designer of the nominated film. The category was first introduced at the 19th Annual Black Reel Awards where Ruth E. Carter took home the first award in this category for Black Panther. Carter took home the award again in 2020 for Dolemite Is My Name becoming the second person following Denzel Washington to have consecutive wins in the same category.

== Winners and nominees ==
=== 2010s ===
Year	Costume Designer	Film	Ref.
2019	Ruth E. Carter	Black Panther	
2019	Marci Rodgers	BlacKkKlansman	
2019	Caroline Eselin	If Beale Street Could Talk	
2019	Deirdra Elizabeth Green	Sorry to Bother You	
2019	Paco Delgado	A Wrinkle in Time	

=== 2020s ===
Year	Costume Designer	Film	Ref.
2020	Ruth E. Carter	Dolemite Is My Name	
2020	Paul Tazewell	Harriet	
2020	Mitchell Travers	Hustlers	
2020	Shiona Turini	Queen & Slim	
2020	Kym Barrett	Us	
2021	Michael Wilkinson	Jingle Jangle: A Christmas Journey	
2021	Ann Roth	Ma Rainey's Black Bottom	
2021	Francine Jamison-Tanchuck	One Night in Miami...	
2021	Phoenix Mellow	Sylvie's Love	
2021	Paolo Nieddu	The United States vs. Billie Holiday	
2022	Antoinette Messam	The Harder They Fall	
2022	Ruth E. Carter	Coming 2 America	
2022	Marci Rodgers	Passing	
2022	Mary Zophres	The Tragedy of Macbeth	
2022	Paul Tazewell	West Side Story	

== Multiple nominations and wins ==
=== Multiple Wins ===
2 wins

- Ruth E. Carter

=== Multiple nominations ===
3 nominations

- Ruth E. Carter

2 nominations

- Marci Rodgers
- Paul Tazewell
