= Marci Rodgers =

American costume designer

- Born: Evanston, Illinois, U.S.
- Occupation: Costume designer

Marci Rodgers is an American costume designer for film, television and stage. She is best known for her work on Till, Wu-Tang: An American Saga, High Flying Bird and BlacKkKlansman.

== Life and career ==
Rodgers was born in Evanston, Illinois. After graduating with a BBA from Howard University, she assisted costume designer Reggie Ray in several Broadway plays. In 2015, Spike Lee hired her as a production assistant on Chi-Raq. She then obtained her MFA in Costume Design from the University of Maryland in 2016.

Rodgers is a member of the Academy of Motion Picture Arts and Sciences, voting in the costume designers branch.

== Filmography ==
=== Film ===
- 2026: Michael
- 2022: Till
- 2021: No Sudden Move
- 2021: Passing
- 2020: Lost Girls
- 2019: The Day Shall Come
- 2019: High Flying Bird
- 2018: BlacKkKlansman
- 2018: Pass Over

=== Television ===
- 2022: Paper Girls
- 2019: Wu-Tang: An American Saga
- 2017–2019 : She's Gotta Have It

== Awards and nominations ==
Year	Result	Award	Category	Work	Ref.
2022	Won	Hamilton Behind the Camera Awards	Costume Designer	Till	
2022	Nominated	Black Reel Awards	Outstanding Costume Design	Passing	
2019	Nominated	Black Reel Awards	Outstanding Costume Design	BlacKkKlansman	
2019	Nominated	Costume Designers Guild	Excellence in Period Film	BlacKkKlansman	
2019	Nominated	London Film Critics' Circle	Technical Achievement Award	BlacKkKlansman	
