= Charlie Wachtel =

American director, producer and screenwriter

Charlie Wachtel is an American director, producer and screenwriter. He is best known for co-writing the 2018 American film BlacKkKlansman by Spike Lee alongside David Rabinowitz, Kevin Willmott, and Lee. The film was nominated for six Academy Awards, winning in the Best Adapted Screenplay category.

Watchel graduated from American University in 2009. Wachtel and Rabinowitz also worked on a script for Thacher Island, based on Casey Sherman’s Animal, and Madness, a series about college basketball.
