= Joe Kenda =

American police detective (born 1946)

- Born: Joseph Patrick Kenda; August 28, 1946 (age 79); Herminie, Pennsylvania, U.S.
- Spouse: Mary Kathleen Mohler (m. 1967)
- Police career
- Country: United States
- Department: Colorado Springs Police Department
- Service years: 1973–1996
- Rank: Lieutenant
- Other work: Documentary television star, Author

Joseph Patrick Kenda (born August 28, 1946) is a retired Colorado Springs Police Department detective lieutenant who was involved in 387 homicide cases over a 23-year career. He solved 356 cases, a closure rate of 92%. He was featured on the Investigation Discovery television show Homicide Hunter, on which series he recounted stories of cases that he had solved. Kenda hosts the Discovery+ show American Detective With Lt. Joe Kenda.

== Early life ==
Kenda was born August 28, 1946 in Herminie, Pennsylvania, and was raised there. His paternal grandparents had immigrated in 1913 from Čezsoča in what is now Slovenia. His father, William, served as an intelligence officer in the United States Army during World War II and ran a trucking business. His mother, Virginia (née Morrissey), was from Colorado Springs.

He graduated from Greensburg Central Catholic High School in 1964, and attended the University of Pittsburgh. He married his high school girlfriend, Mary Kathleen Mohler, on December 26, 1967. After graduating with a B.A. in political science, Kenda earned a master's degree in international relations from Ohio State University in 1970.

Kenda considered a career with the Foreign Service, but after a classified briefing with the Central Intelligence Agency decided it was not for him. After working at his father's trucking business, Kenda joined the Colorado Springs Police Department in 1973.

== Law enforcement career ==
Kenda joined the Colorado Springs Police Department in 1973. In 1977, he was promoted to the rank of detective and assigned a role in the burglary division of the department.

In 1977, Kenda volunteered to take over an attempted murder case deemed unsolvable by veteran detectives. Kenda solved the case and was moved to the police department's homicide unit. He was promoted to sergeant in 1980, and returned to homicide in 1984.

As a homicide detective, Kenda solved 356 of 387 homicide cases, a closure rate of 92%. Kenda credited his ability to close cases to being a student of human nature and being good at telling when people were lying. His claim of solving 356 cases between 1977-1996 has been called into question by his colleagues.

Kenda worked as a homicide detective with the Colorado Springs Police Department from 1977 to 1981, and 1984–1996.

In the final episode of Homicide Hunter: Lt. Joe Kenda, called "The End", the personal impact of his work in homicide is detailed, as is his retirement, work as a bus driver for special-needs students, and battle with post-traumatic stress disorder.

== Television career ==
In 2008, Denver television series editor Patrick Bryant contacted Kenda to discuss a television series about Kenda's career as a homicide detective. The series, Homicide Hunter: Lt Joe Kenda, aired in September 2011 on the Investigation Discovery network. Scene reenactments were filmed in Knoxville, Tennessee. In its eighth season, Homicide Hunter was Investigation Discovery’s top show, averaging 1.7 million viewers each week in the third quarter of 2018. The series finale, "The End", aired on January 29, 2020.

In December 2020, Kenda began a new series, American Detective with Lt. Joe Kenda, with each episode featuring Kenda discussing the cases of different homicide detectives in the United States. It premiered on January 4, 2021 with the launch of the Discovery+ streaming service. The show was later rebranded as Homicide Hunter: American Detective.

== Personal life ==
Kenda and his wife Mary (though most people know her by Kathy) have two children, Dan and Kris. Kenda's family appeared in two episodes of the Homicide Hunter, "Married to the Job", which aired on February 6, 2019, and in the series finale "The End" on January 29, 2020.

Kenda lives in the Tidewater region of Virginia.

== Cold cases resolved ==
After his retirement, two unsolved cases that Kenda had investigated during his career were finally solved in 2021 with the use of DNA: the homicides of Darlene Krashoc in 1987 and Mary Lynn Vialpando in 1988.

== Writing career ==
On July 25, 2023, Kenda's debut novel All Is Not Forgiven was released by Blackstone Publishing. It is a fictionalized account of the rookie Det. Kenda’s investigation of a case in the year 1975. Kenda's follow up novel "First Do No Harm" was released on the 9 September 2025.
