= Ron Stallworth =

American police officer (born 1953)

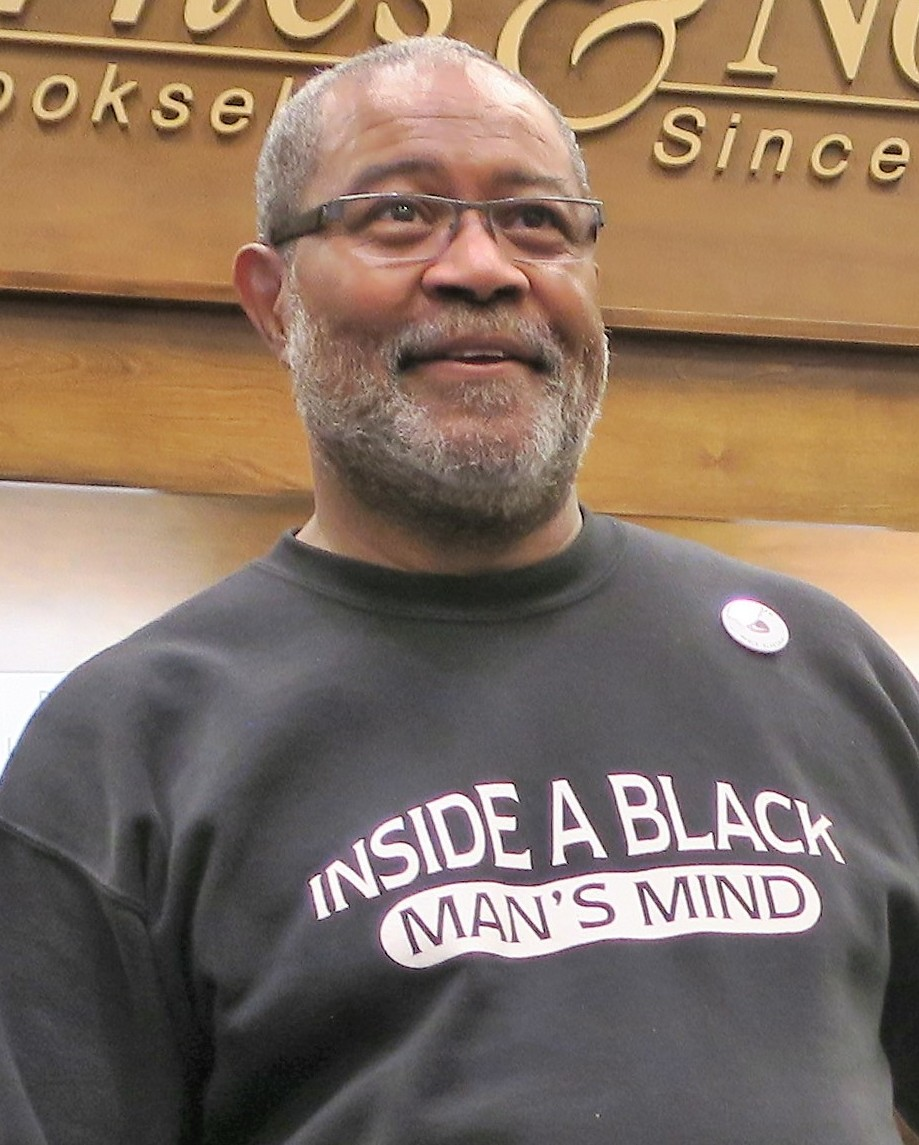
- Stallworth in 2019
- Born: June 18, 1953 (age 73); Chicago, Illinois, U.S.
- Education: Columbia College (New York City)
- Known for: Infiltration of the KKK
- Notable work: Black Klansman (2014)
- Police career
- Department: Colorado Springs Police
- Service years: 1972–1980
- Rank: Detective
- Civilian police career
- Department: Utah Public Safety
- Service years: 1980–2005
- Rank: Sergeant
- Website: Official website

Ronnell Stallworth (born June 18, 1953) is an American retired police officer who infiltrated the Ku Klux Klan in Colorado Springs, Colorado, in the late 1970s. He was the first African-American detective in the Colorado Springs Police Department.

In the 2018 film BlacKkKlansman, which depicts his infiltration of the Ku Klux Klan, Stallworth is portrayed by John David Washington.

== Early life ==
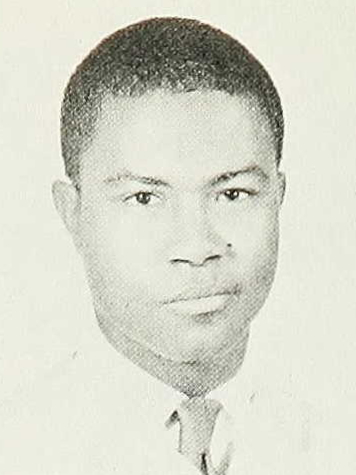
Stallworth in the Austin High School yearbook, 1971

Stallworth was born in Chicago, Illinois, on June 18, 1953. He grew up in El Paso, Texas, after his mother moved the family there. In his autobiography, he said of the move "My mother moving our family to El Paso was the best decision she ever made, as it was a far cry from the poverty, gangs, and conflict in [Chicago's] South Side, where I would have come of age if she had not left."

Stallworth graduated from Austin High School in 1971, where he was both a member of the student council, and of a district-wide advisory board; he was also voted "most popular".

== Career ==
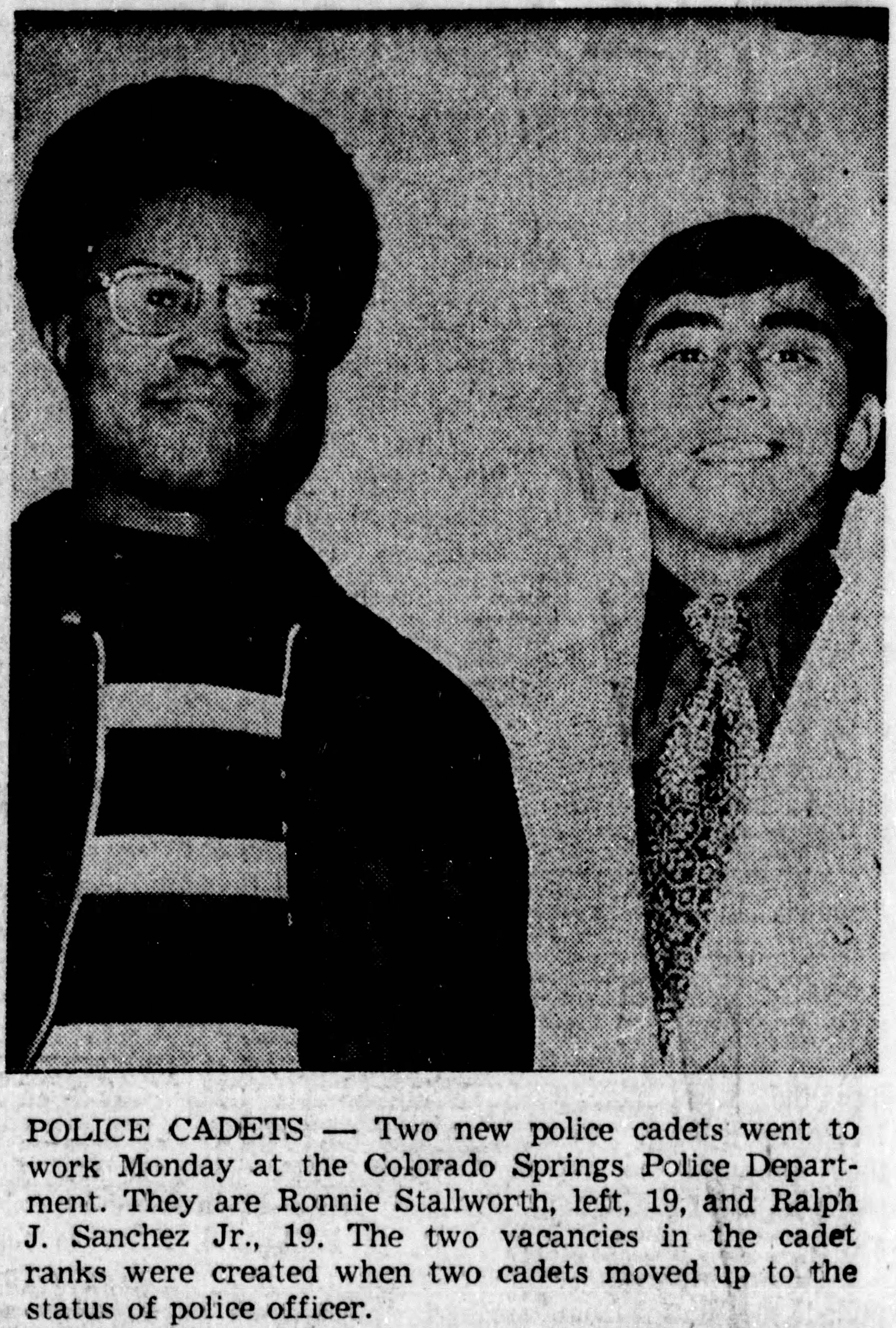
Stallworth (left) in the Colorado Springs Gazette Telegraph, November 15, 1972

In mid-1972, Stallworth's family moved to Colorado Springs, where he first took an interest in a career in law enforcement. He joined the department as a cadet in November of that year, becoming the first black cadet in the Colorado Springs Police Department.

According to Stallworth, he knew early on that he eventually wanted to work as an undercover police officer. His first undercover assignment came when Kwame Ture was invited to speak at a Colorado Springs nightclub with a black clientele. Stallworth was asked if he would go undercover to observe the speech. He eagerly accepted and was later assigned to the intelligence section of his department.

=== Infiltration of the Klan ===
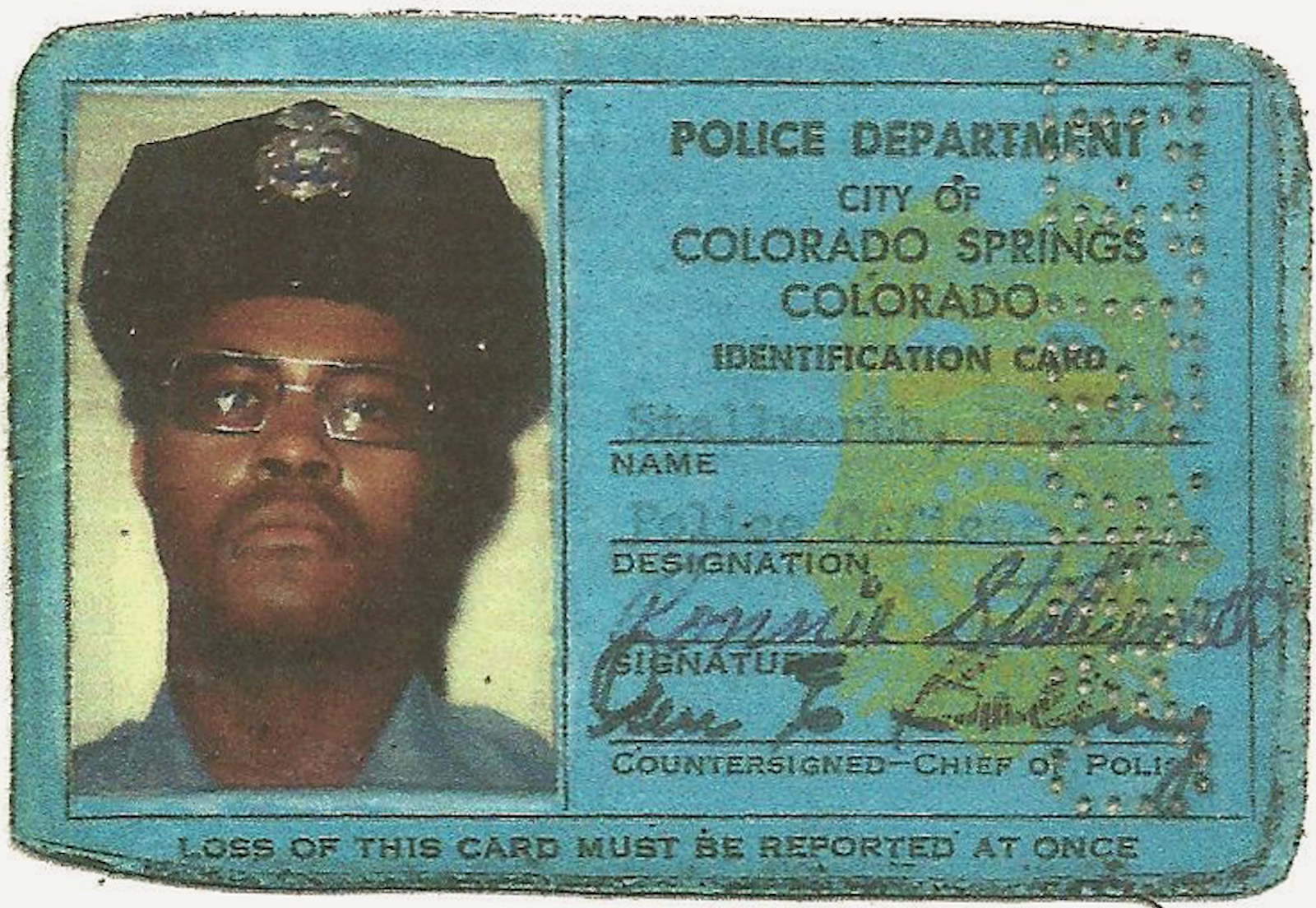
Stallworth's Colorado Springs Police Department ID card

In 1978, Stallworth noticed a classified ad in the local paper seeking members to start a new chapter of the Ku Klux Klan in the city. He responded to the posting via mail to a P.O. box, and provided them an address and phone number. A Klan member phoned Stallworth, who then posed as a racist white man who "hated Blacks, Jews, Mexicans, Asians". During the conversation, he learned that the man founding the new chapter was a soldier at nearby Fort Carson. Stallworth arranged to meet the man at a local bar and sent a white undercover narcotics officer to stand in for him at the meeting, wired to record any conversations.

The subterfuge was a success, and Stallworth continued to pose as a Klan member for the next nine months, usually talking on the phone with other members and sending the white officer in his place when face-to-face meetings were necessary. He ran a double investigation into the Klan and Progressive Labor Party (PLP), including its mass organization, the International Committee Against Racism. He vacillated between Klan calls and PLP meetings, which would address Klan presence and culminate in counter-marches. Stallworth phoned David Duke, who was the Klan's Grand Wizard at the time, at his headquarters in New Orleans to ask about the status of his membership application. Duke apologized for the delay in getting the application processed and promised to see to it personally that Stallworth's application was processed and sent to him. Within a short time, Stallworth's Klan certificate of membership arrived in the mail with Duke's signature. He framed the certificate and hung it on his office wall, where it stayed for years.

=== Post-Klan ===
After the investigation into the Klan closed, Stallworth kept it a secret and told no one about his role in it. He transferred to the Utah Department of Public Safety, where he worked as an investigator for nearly 20 years.

== Retirement ==
After retiring in 2005, Stallworth earned a bachelor's degree in criminal justice from Missouri's Columbia College's Salt Lake City Campus in 2007.

In January 2006, Stallworth gave an interview to Salt Lake City's Deseret News in which he described his infiltration and investigation of the Klan and later disclosed that the investigation revealed several members were on active duty with the U.S. Armed Forces, including two individuals posted at NORAD. The two members at NORAD were reassigned and Stallworth was told that they were given remote postings, "somewhere like the North Pole or Greenland".

In 2014, Stallworth published a book titled Black Klansman about his investigative experience. For his source material, he used a casebook he had assembled during the assignment and kept for himself after the investigation. Stallworth published a second book, The Gangs of Zion: A Black Cop's Crusade in Mormon Country, in 2024, this one detailing his work combating gang activity and civic negligence in Utah.

== In popular culture ==
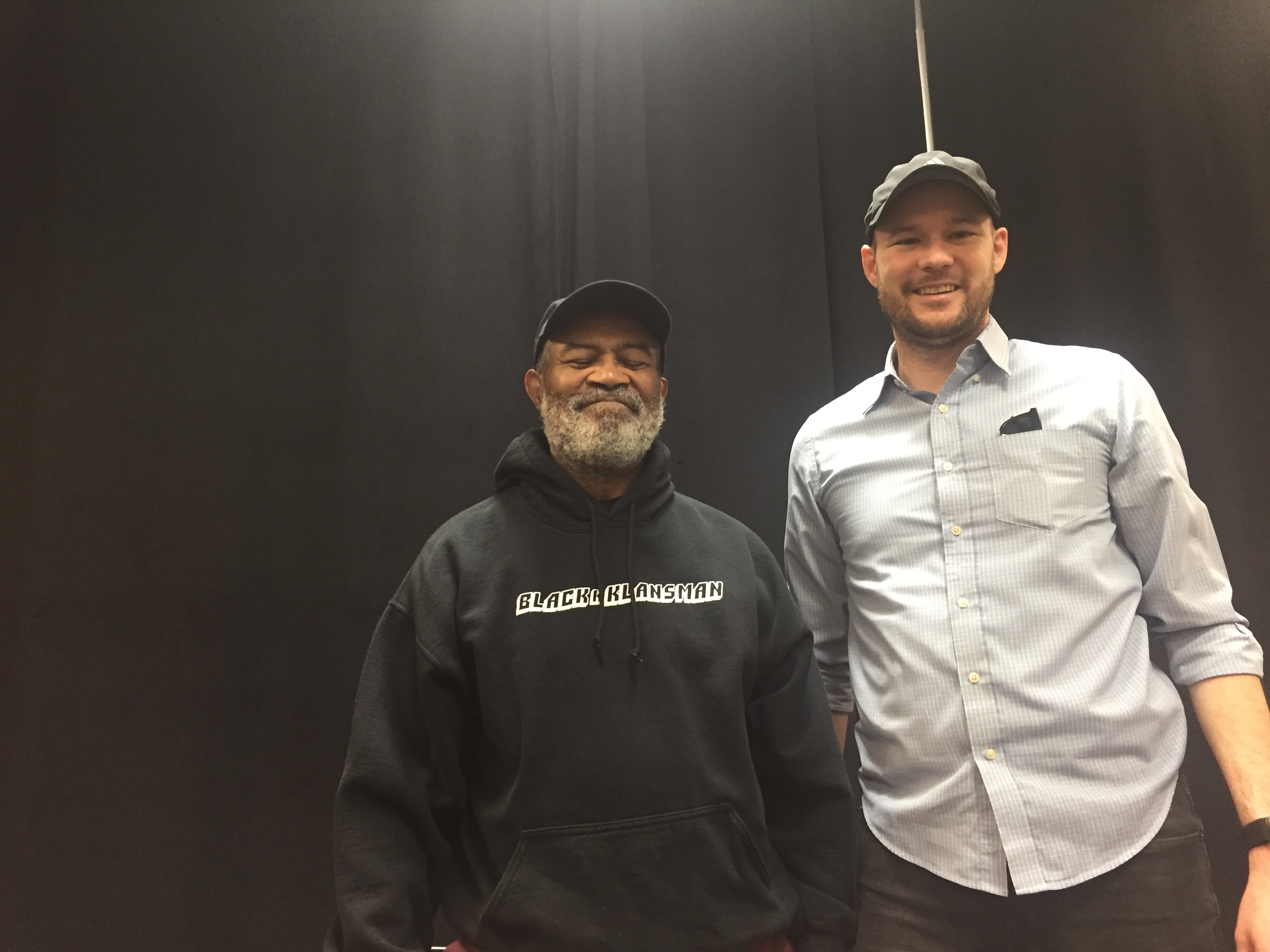
Stallworth (left) with El Paso City Representative Chris Canales, March 16, 2024

Ron's manager, Andy Frances, thought to make his book Black Klansman into the film BlacKkKlansman. Spike Lee directed, co-produced, and co-wrote, while Shaun Redick and Jordan Peele produced. John David Washington played Stallworth alongside Adam Driver as Flip Zimmerman and Topher Grace as David Duke; Laura Harrier, Ryan Eggold, Corey Hawkins, Alec Baldwin, Jasper Pääkkönen and Harry Belafonte also appeared. The film, released nationwide on August 10, 2018 and in select theaters two weeks prior, won the Grand Prix Award at the Cannes Film Festival and Best Adapted Screenplay at the Academy Awards. It was also nominated for five additional Academy Awards, including Best Picture.
