= Homicide Hunter =

American TV true crime series (2011–2020)

- Also known as: Homicide Hunter: Lt. Joe Kenda
- Genre: Documentary
- Presented by: Joseph P. Kenda
- Narrated by: Josh Casaubon
- Country of origin: United States
- Original language: English
- No. of seasons: 9
- No. of episodes: 144

Production
- Executive producers: Thomas Cutler (ID); Stephen Land (Jupiter); Todd Moss (Jupiter); Erich Sturm (Jupiter); Jason Sklaver (ITV)
- Running time: 43 minutes
- Production companies: Jupiter Entertainment (Season 2–9); ITV Studios (Season 1)

Original release
- Network: Investigation Discovery
- Release: October 25, 2011 – January 29, 2020

Homicide Hunter (also known as Homicide Hunter: Lt. Joe Kenda) is an American crime documentary television series which aired on the Investigation Discovery (ID) television network for nine seasons starting in 2011, totaling 144 episodes. The series showcases the career of retired Colorado Springs, Colorado, police department detective Joe Kenda. The series combines interviews with Kenda and others, along with reenactments.

Kenda joined the department in 1973 and was promoted to detective in 1977 and assigned to the burglary division. However, after solving a double shooting which veteran detectives believed was unsolvable, he was assigned to the homicide division. The case was presented in the Season 4 finale "My First Case". Kenda states he solved 387 cases (other sources state he solved 356 of 387 cases). When Kenda retired in 1996, he was commander of the department's major crimes unit.

The cases are told by Kenda in his trademark deadpan manner, with touches of dry humor. Re-enactments feature actor and former "Director of Operations" for convicted private investigator Chris Butler, Carl Marino portraying a younger Kenda in 137 episodes, and narration by Josh Casaubon. Episodes also featured filmed recollections by witnesses to the crimes, family and friends of the victims, members of law enforcement and the media, and others. Though the program is reviewed for accuracy, Kenda does not read from a script for the series saying he vividly recalls his cases and is more comfortable speaking extemporaneously.

Kenda recounted that at age nine during a visit to the Pittsburgh Zoo, he experienced what he calls an epiphany about human nature: "There was a big sign, and it read, 'Around this corner is the most dangerous animal on earth' ... and it was a mirror from ceiling to floor. Everyone was looking in the mirror, and everyone was wondering, 'Well, what is this about?'"

Homicide Hunter debuted on October 25, 2011. In May 2019, Kenda announced in a video posted on the show's official Facebook page that the ninth season of Homicide Hunter would be its last. However, he is still committed to working with Investigation Discovery.

The ninth and final season premiered on August 28, 2019. The final episode aired on January 29, 2020.

== Episodes ==
Season	Episodes	Originally released	
Season	Episodes	First released	Last released
1	6	October 25, 2011	November 29, 2011
2	10	October 2, 2012	December 11, 2012
3	13	October 1, 2013	December 24, 2013
4	13	August 19, 2014	November 18, 2014
5	20	August 18, 2015	February 2, 2016
6	21	August 24, 2016	February 8, 2017
7	21	August 23, 2017	February 14, 2018
8	20	August 29, 2018	February 13, 2019
9	20	August 28, 2019	January 29, 2020

=== Season 1 (2011) ===
No. overall	No. in season	Title	Original release date
1	1	"Into Thin Air"	October 25, 2011
After being dropped off at a bar by her sister's boyfriend, a woman is never seen alive again.
2	2	"Six Feet Under"	November 1, 2011
When a young woman is found strangled in the backseat of her car, Detective Joe Kenda must uncover her past.
3	3	"A Killer Always Rings Twice"	November 8, 2011
After 22-year-old Micki Filmore is found raped and murdered in her apartment, Lt. Joe Kenda focuses his investigation on a man with whom she danced the night before.
4	4	"Everybody Lies"	November 15, 2011
When a church deacon is beaten to death, Lt. Joe Kenda uncovers a secret.
5	5	"Secret Life"	November 22, 2011
When a military wife is found strangled, Lt. Joe Kenda is on the trail to find her killer.
6	6	"Chance Encounter"	November 29, 2011
Lt. Joe Kenda is on the trail of a serial killer.

=== Season 2 (2012) ===
No. overall	No. in season	Title	Original release date
7	1	"I Now Pronounce You Dead"	October 2, 2012
Dianne Hood, a mother of three, is shot to death on her way home.
8	2	"A Gathering of Evil"	October 9, 2012
After teenage runaway Maggie Fetty is found strangled to death on a mountain road, Lt. Joe Kenda must turn suspects against each to solve the crime.
9	3	"Last Call for Murder"	October 16, 2012
Lt. Joe Kenda examines a fuzzy image from a newly installed surveillance camera while investigating the murder of five people at a shopping center wherein much of the evidence was destroyed in a fire.
10	4	"The Spy Who Killed Me"	October 30, 2012
The body of Elsie Jennes is found in the basement of her burning house.
11	5	"Slaughterhouse Six"	November 6, 2012
Layne Schmidtke is beaten to death by a group of teenagers.
12	6	"Drive Thru Murder"	November 13, 2012
Missy Berry, a fast food manager, is found dead in a running car at a deserted intersection.
13	7	"Primal Fear"	November 20, 2012
Lt. Joe Kenda must comb through unreliable testimony from teenage witnesses when investigating the shooting death of a 14-year-old student stemming from a heated lunchroom confrontation.
14	8	"A Beautiful Shade of Death"	November 27, 2012
When police discover the lifeless bodies of Sophia Gerardo, four children and a cat, they suspect a ritualistic mass murder. Lt. Joe Kenda then uncovers a cause more frightening and deadly than anyone could've imagined.
15	9	"Shot Through the Heart"	December 4, 2012
A 15-year-old boy finds his mother shot to death when he comes home from school.
16	10	"Mr. Violence"	December 11, 2012
Lt. Joe Kenda gets an unexpected tip while investigating the case of a 29-year-old man shot to death outside a neighborhood bar.

=== Season 3 (2013) ===
No. overall	No. in season	Title	Original release date
17	1	"Murder Bites"	October 1, 2013
A young woman is found naked and strangled in a park close to her home.
18	2	"River of Blood"	October 8, 2013
Hunters find a bloody car on a remote road. Lt. Kenda discovers the car was reported stolen, and uncovers a plot of revenge.
19	3	"Weapon of Choice"	October 15, 2013
It appears as though Shaundra Murr has been killed in a hit-and-run accident until Lt. Joe Kenda uncovers evidence that points to a crime of passion.
20	4	"Run for Your Life"	October 22, 2013
After a marathon runner's dead body is found hours before a big race, Lt. Joe Kenda sets off to find the killer.
21	5	"Murder in a Bottle"	October 29, 2013
Lt. Joe Kenda uses groundbreaking technology to investigate the death of a man found stabbed in a seedy motel.
22	6	"Preying on the Innocent"	November 5, 2013
When a politician's son is found murdered in his basement, Lt. Joe Kenda must sift through a list of nefarious suspects while delving into the victim's eccentric lifestyle.
23	7	"Dead Man Falling"	November 12, 2013
A family of four is found brutally murdered and police believe they have a spree killer on their hands until Lt. Joe Kenda discovers a connection between the perpetrator and his victims.
24	8	"Blood Red Highway"	November 19, 2013
Local grocery store owners are brutally attacked and left for dead. Lt. Joe Kenda sets out to catch these killers with little more than a vague witness description.
25	9	"My, My, Merry Christmas"	November 26, 2013
A restaurant worker is found shot to death on Christmas Day. The police learn of a relative with a long criminal history who might hold the key to the mystery.
26	10	"Death Rains Down"	December 3, 2013
When a restaurant worker is gunned down in a hail of bullets, Lt. Joe Kenda must penetrate a web of lies to find a suspect he considers to be one of the most dangerous criminal masterminds he has ever faced.
27	11	"Fate Worse Than Death"	December 10, 2013
Joggers discover a body mutilated beyond recognition at the bottom of a ravine, and Lt. Joe Kenda must identify the victim before being able to uncover the ill-fated love triangle that led to his death.
28	12	"Razor's Edge"	December 17, 2013
Lt. Joe Kenda delves into an apparent suicide, uncovering a murder mystery as shocking as it is tragic.
29	13	"Blood Sisters"	December 24, 2013
The bullet-ridden bodies of two sisters are discovered in a house littered with mysterious clues.

=== Season 4 (2014) ===
No. overall	No. in season	Title	Original release date
30	1	"Eyes Wide Shut"	August 19, 2014
A park ranger finds the body of an amateur boxer floating in a creek, and Lt. Joe Kenda's investigation reveals the killers may have hidden in plain sight.
31	2	"Death Comes Knocking"	August 26, 2014
When a mother and son are gunned down in cold blood, Lt. Joe Kenda learns the killer's murderous rampage is not yet over.
32	3	"Bad Things Come in Threes"	September 2, 2014
Lt. Joe Kenda must determine the intended target when two young mothers are killed behind a crowded bar.
33	4	"Death Grip"	September 9, 2014
The body of a furniture salesman is found behind the wheel shot in the temple.
34	5	"Poker Face"	September 16, 2014
Lt. Joe Kenda discovers murder victim Jamie Foster's line of work required him to rub elbows with a host of unsavory characters.
35	6	"Blood Innocence"	September 23, 2014
Lt. Joe Kenda enlists the help of engineers to identify the murder weapon used in the beating death of a war hero.
36	7	"Snitch"	October 7, 2014
Lt. Joe Kenda grapples with a long list of suspects while investigating the murder of police informant Jimmie Stevenson.
37	8	"The Master Key"	October 14, 2014
Lt. Joe Kenda finds himself shocked to the core during a city-wide manhunt for the suspect who killed a pregnant woman and her young sons.
38	9	"#1 Suspect"	October 21, 2014
A slew of hateful messages surface after a mother is killed in what initially appears to be a robbery gone wrong.
39	10	"Magic Bullet"	October 28, 2014
Lt. Joe Kenda uncovers a conspiracy while investigating the shooting death of a man who was outside of a strip club.
40	11	"A Prayer for the Dying"	November 4, 2014
Raymond Archuleta is stabbed through the heart while intervening in a squabble at a store, and Lt. Joe Kenda is left with a bloody flower bouquet as a clue to solving the case.
41	12	"Bump in the Night"	November 11, 2014
Lt. Joe Kenda finds that an apparently slain pilot instructor committed suicide; Kenda is called to a shooting only to discover the victim is an old family friend.
42	13	"My First Case"	November 18, 2014
In his first case, rookie Joe Kenda volunteers to work a multi-victim shooting deemed to be unsolvable by the veteran detectives.

=== Season 5 (2015–16) ===
No. overall	No. in season	Title	Original release date
43	1	"Bad Blood"	August 18, 2015
A gruesome clue leads Lt. Joe Kenda's team to an unlikely suspect when a popular U.S. Army veteran is found bleeding to death in a parking lot.
44	2	"Eye of the Beholder"	August 25, 2015
Lt. Joe Kenda encounters one of the most appalling crime scenes of his career which leads to one of the most unlikely of killers; a young soldier dies from a bullet to the neck in what appears to be a suicide.
45	3	"Dead on Target"	September 1, 2015
Lt. Joe Kenda recognizes the hallmark of a sniper when a young father-to-be is shot dead in broad daylight by a single bullet fired from afar.
46	4	"Dead Weight"	September 8, 2015
Lt. Joe Kenda investigates a seemingly random attack that left Mary Moebus dead; Kenda receives a cryptic note that leads him to a bachelor pad with a bedroom soaked in blood.
47	5	"Door No. 12"	September 15, 2015
When Louis Matos and Colleen Johnson are gunned down, Lt. Joe Kenda finds a terrified eyewitness who played an unwitting role in the bloodbath.
48	6	"Loose Cannon"	September 22, 2015
A rampage shooter kills a 24-year-old woman while wounding her 2-year-old child, who is left clinging to life.
49	7	"Mr. LA"	October 6, 2015
When a young man is shot dead at a house party, Lt. Joe Kenda must interview countless suspects until an unusual clue leads him to a self-styled gangster.
50	8	"Blood on the Tracks"	October 13, 2015
Lt. Joe Kenda must listen to a voice from beyond the grave to solve the case of a decapitated body found on train tracks; Kenda exposes a family secret after a girl's body is found in a basement.
51	9	"Victim Zero"	October 20, 2015
After a bar fight ends with the shooting death of a young U.S. Army soldier, Lt. Joe Kenda must infiltrate a revered military institution during the investigation and expose a dangerous vendetta.
52	10	"Pop Goes the Witness"	November 3, 2015
After the lifeless body of Willie McCarty is found at the bottom of a staircase, neighbors draw Lt. Joe Kenda's attention to a truck spotted fleeing the scene.
53	11	"Too Young to Die"	November 10, 2015
After an ambush at a hamburger stand leaves a teenager dead, Lt. Joe Kenda must penetrate rumors to zero in on his prime suspect, then a surprise witness blows the case wide open.
54	12	"Sing Sing, Little Bird"	November 17, 2015
A romantic rendezvous is cut short by a violent home invasion, which leaves young business owner Kelly Knudson bleeding to death on the floor. Lt. Joe Kenda is short on leads until he learns of an ex-roommate with an ax to grind.
55	13	"Point of No Return"	December 1, 2015
After an explosion rocks a sleepy suburb, Lt. Joe Kenda must identify a pile of charred remains and find the killer who triggered the blast; a car chase ends in a violent showdown.
56	14	"Trust No One"	December 8, 2015
After martial artist Carl Hunt suffers a fatal knife wound to the gut, his friends and neighbors fail to offer up any viable leads to Lt. Joe Kenda.
57	15	"Worst I've Ever Seen"	December 15, 2015
After grandparents are shot to death in their home, Lt. Joe Kenda's investigation kicks into high gear when his prime suspect flees for the Mexican border; police officers find a body so badly mutilated it turns the stomachs of seasoned officers.
58	16	"Murder Haunts Me"	January 5, 2016
A young mother-to-be is shot and left for dead; a corpse found floating in Monument Creek leads Lt. Joe Kenda to an encampment on a nearby riverbank.
59	17	"City of Fear"	January 12, 2016
When a spate of violent robberies spreads terror across the city, Lt. Joe Kenda and the major crimes unit are called in to bring the masked gunman to justice.
60	18	"My Case to Solve"	January 19, 2016
As a newly promoted supervisor, Sgt. Joe Kenda gambles his career on a risky strategy to bring the killer of a popular disc jockey to justice.
61	19	"Stuck in a Coffin"	January 26, 2016
After first responders find a lifeless body in the rubble of a five-alarm fire, Lt. Joe Kenda launches a manhunt for a pyromaniac with a callous disregard for human life.
62	20	"My Tortured Soul"	February 2, 2016
While leads are scarce after a woman's body is dumped on a mountain pass, a seemingly unrelated case brings Lt. Joe Kenda within an arm's reach of her killer, then a roadblock forces him to make a painful decision.

=== Season 6 (2016–17) ===
No. overall	No. in season	Title	Original release date
63	1	"Avert Your Eyes"	August 24, 2016
When Pamela Edwards is found shot to death, Lt. Joe Kenda must shield her young daughters from the crime scene. Police soon close in on Edwards' killer, leading to a white-knuckle car and foot chase across Colorado Springs.
64	2	"Sacrificial Lamb"	August 31, 2016
When 13-year-old PJ Grant is found dead from a single gunshot wound to the head, Lt. Joe Kenda assumes it's a suicide. However, when the physical evidence doesn't add up, this opens the door to a world of possibilities, from hatred to human sacrifice.
65	3	"Powder Keg"	September 7, 2016
Violence erupts after uninvited guests crash a barrio birthday party, leaving Enrique Urrutia dead. To prevent a gang war from breaking out, Lt. Joe Kenda must crack an unwritten code of silence and bring Enrique's killer to justice.
66	4	"Make My Day"	September 14, 2016
Lt. Joe Kenda has his doubts after a man steps forward claiming to have killed Keith Andrews in self-defense; when civil rights activist Gretchen McRae is found dead in her home, the authorities make another shocking find on the premises.
67	5	"We Kill the Ones We Love"	September 21, 2016
Lt. Joe Kenda must put his faith in a burglar to crack the case of a drive-by shooting; Cherie Bradley and her ex-boyfriend Anthony Carroll are found dead, and it's up to Kenda to discover which of their relatives did the deed.
68	6	"Night Terrors"	October 5, 2016
When Cheryl Brantner's children find her dead in the bathtub, Lt. Joe Kenda must determine whether her death is the result of an accident or something worse; a gathering of tattoo artists turns ugly, leaving Philip Titus dead.
69	7	"Tighten the Screws"	October 12, 2016
After young Iraq War veteran Curtis Ashley ends up dead, Lt. Joe Kenda must solve his murder using only a shred of evidence and his keen awareness of the criminal mind.
70	8	"When the Music Stops"	October 19, 2016
Vietnam War veteran Charles Walker is found unconscious after a stabbing attack so savage even 45 units of blood cannot save his life. It's up to Lt. Joe Kenda to follow the bloody trail of clues and piece together the victim's last moments.
71	9	"Settle the Score"	October 26, 2016
Police are perplexed to learn Johnny Crawford may have been shot dead over a musical instrument, but Lt. Joe Kenda digs deeper, and it soon becomes clear the young man wasn't killed for his own sins, but for someone else's.
72	10	"The Outlaw"	November 2, 2016
After a gunfight at a biker bar claims the lives of two men, Lt. Joe Kenda must delve deep into the world of an infamous biker gang to determine whether the cause behind the violent encounter was gang rivalry or something more personal.
73	11	"New Year's Evil"	November 9, 2016
It's New Year's Eve weekend, and in the midst of the revelry, Miguel Mendez is beaten to death outside a convenience store. Lt. Joe Kenda faces a challenging investigation, his only clues coming from a drunken witness and Miguel's strange injuries.
74	12	"Dead Man Walking"	November 16, 2016
Led astray by addiction, George Ferribee is found executed. Lt. Joe Kenda then learns the victim had recently been kidnapped and assumes the two crimes are related. However, Kenda soon discovers things are much more complicated than he had expected.
75	13	"The Line Goes Dead"	November 30, 2016
When a woman's severed head is found, Lt. Joe Kenda uses forensics and interrogation to find both her body and her killer; a young man's murder looks like a robbery gone wrong until Kenda investigates further.
76	14	"Metal on Metal"	December 7, 2016
A star athlete is gunned down just weeks before starting college, leaving his family heartbroken and detectives stumped. Lt. Joe Kenda pries into the victim's personal life and learns more about his last night on Earth.
77	15	"Bullet With My Name on It"	January 1, 2017
In his first year on the force, rookie patrol officer Joe Kenda quickly learns the ropes, but when he tries to stop a brawling mob on his own, he finds himself in the line of fire.
78	16	"Shattered"	January 4, 2017
After two teenagers discover a lifeless body in the street, Lt. Joe Kenda must determine whether the killer was a jealous lover or an unhinged individual; Kenda turns to a forensic expert to see if a young mother hung herself.
79	17	"Justified"	January 11, 2017
A young man is found gunned down, leading Lt. Joe Kenda to delve into his troubled past and his connection to the world of rare coins; a mother of five is shot in the head, and it's up to Kenda to uncover the truth behind her untimely death.
80	18	"Officer Down"	January 18, 2017
Sgt. Joe Kenda faces his worst nightmare when he learns that a friend and fellow officer, Mark Dabling, has been killed in the line of duty. Police conduct an all-out manhunt and discover the gunman is even more dangerous than they'd thought.
81	19	"My Worst Fear"	January 25, 2017
The discovery of a 13-year-old boy killed in an explosion shocks police and their grief turns to alarm when they discover a second, unexploded bomb. To catch the killer, Detective Joe Kenda must first figure out the bomb's intended target.
82	20	"My Rookie Mistake"	February 1, 2017
In 1973, a young man named Joe Kenda quits his job to pursue his dream of being a police officer. The rookie is very confident until one night when he comes face to face with his own mortality and makes a decision that will forever shape his life.
83	21	"The Monster Awakes"	February 8, 2017
After Julie Smith reports being sexually assaulted, Lt. Joe Kenda and his Sex Crimes Unit realize her assault resembles other attacks on the eastside of town. It's a race against time to catch a serial rapist before he strikes again.

=== Season 7 (2017–18) ===
No. overall	No. in season	Title	Original release date
84	1	"Bad Moon Rising"	August 23, 2017
On the night before Halloween, a real life nightmare unfolds as a young man is found clinging to life. The case takes a dark turn after Lt. Joe Kenda learns there's a second victim somewhere in the woods.
85	2	"Written in Blood"	August 30, 2017
Shot outside an auto parts store in broad daylight, Antoine McKenzie leaves behind a final message written in his own blood for Lt. Joe Kenda to puzzle over as his only lead.
86	3	"Raise the Dead"	September 6, 2017
When 71-year-old Orville Head dies, no one questions the death of an elderly man with health problems. However, when a tip comes in that suggest foul play, Lt. Joe Kenda must exhume the deceased man's body to reveal the truth.
87	4	"Knock Knock"	September 13, 2017
A gathering of friends turns deadly after William Davis is shot in the head by a gunman. When the witnesses are unable to provide any solid leads, Lt. Joe Kenda digs into Davis' past and starts to suspect someone in his inner circle is lying.
88	5	"Rearview Mirror"	September 20, 2017
When a retired military man runs over a pedestrian, it's up to Lt. Joe Kenda to determine if the accident was the result of bad brakes or bad intent; a shooting in a dive bar leads to a quick arrest, but Kenda can't shake feelings of unease.
89	6	"Jekyll & Hyde"	October 4, 2017
Lt. Joe Kenda looks for answers in the death of Calvin Blair, a young man stabbed and left for dead on the roadside; after Alexandra Drake is shot in the face, she manages to tell police it was an accident, but Kenda isn't so sure he believes her.
90	7	"After School Special"	October 11, 2017
Beloved teacher Barbara Lewis is poisoned in her classroom. As doctors fight to save her life, Lt. Joe Kenda and his team delve into her personal affairs looking for clues, but the biggest revelation comes from the poison itself.
91	8	"Sex, Lies, and Surveillance Tape"	October 18, 2017
A confrontation between enemies turns deadly, and Lt. Joe Kenda's best hope for answers lies with a grainy, dubbed-over surveillance tape; an elderly man fights for his life after a suspicious slip-and-fall.
92	9	"Manifesto"	October 25, 2017
A young sheriff's deputy is posted to guard the scene of a charred cabin on the slopes of Pikes Peak overnight. He's then found dead in his patrol car the next morning, and his fellow lawmen must set aside their grief to hunt down his killer.
93	10	"Where Is Claudia Jane?"	November 1, 2017
After a 15-year-old girl goes missing, Lt. Joe Kenda investigates the mysterious circumstances surrounding her disappearance; a family man is shot dead on his neighbor's doorstep.
94	11	"Lockdown"	November 8, 2017
When a crazed gunman terrorizes his neighborhood, officers put themselves in the line of fire to restore order; a man discovers his elderly father has been stabbed in the back, and the knife itself turns out to be Lt. Joe Kenda's biggest clue.
95	12	"Time Bomb"	November 15, 2017
Rookie detective Joe Kenda investigates an explosion at the Pikes Peak National Bank. He must figure out if the bombing is an isolated robbery or the opening move in a wave of terror and destruction about to descend upon Colorado Springs.
96	13	"John 3:16"	November 29, 2017
A man rushes his friend to the hospital with serious gunshot wounds, reporting they were robbed by strangers. After realizing the facts don't add up, Lt. Joe Kenda and his team go on the hunt for an eyewitness who could crack the case wide open.
97	14	"Timothy Peart's Last Dance"	January 1, 2018
After a teenager is killed at a party, police question the guests and wonder if they're all part of a cover-up; a reported suicide leaves Lt. Joe Kenda with doubts.
98	15	"Body in the Freezer"	January 3, 2018
A meeting between two businessmen leaves one shot in the face. Lt. Kenda realizes the victim could actually be the aggressor, shot struggling over his own gun.
99	16	"Eyes of a Child"	January 10, 2018
A churchgoing grandmother is found stabbed to death in her apartment, leaving Lt. Joe Kenda to wonder what sort of monster could do such a thing; Kenda investigates the mysterious death of a successful dentist, and the case gets personal.
100	17	"I Will Hunt You Down"	January 17, 2018
Lt. Joe Kenda and his Fugitive Unit search for two escaped inmates in Colorado Springs; police break up a domestic dispute and find a body in the bedroom.
101	18	"Gut Instinct"	January 24, 2018
When a woman fails to come home from work, her daughter knows something terrible must have happened and reports her missing. As the investigation unfolds, Lt. Joe Kenda realizes he could be dealing with a fledgling serial killer.
102	19	"Joker in the Pack"	January 31, 2018
A card game is interrupted by gunfire, leaving a young man dead. Lt. Joe Kenda soon learns the seeds of his destruction were sewn earlier the same day; Kenda responds to a double shooting, taking him and his team down memory lane.
103	20	"Bring My Baby Home"	February 7, 2018
A newborn girl is kidnapped, leaving her mother in anguish and police scrambling to find her. As days go by with no sign of the baby or demands for ransom, Sgt. Joe Kenda and Sgt. Robert Sapp fear she's been sold on the black market or worse.
104	21	"One Through the Heart"	February 14, 2018
A young man is shot dead while on a first date; a man is found dead, and his young wife has fled the scene, prompting Lt. Joe Kenda to investigate whether she was present for his murder or suicide.

=== Season 8 (2018–19) ===
No. overall	No. in season	Title	Original release date
105	1	"My Second Case"	August 29, 2018
A woman's mangled body is found beside a lonely stretch of highway. When the coroner suspects foul play, Lt. Joe Kenda is called in to solve the second homicide case of his career. Along the way, the rookie detective learns a painful lesson.
106	2	"End of Days"	September 5, 2018
The discovery of a family home littered with corpses leaves Lt. Kenda with the task of unwinding the paranoid obsessions of a diseased mind and forces him to face his greatest fear; a fatal beating at a motel illuminates the dark underbelly of love.
107	3	".357 Magnum"	September 12, 2018
The murder of a popular teenager at a crowded house party sends Lt. Joe Kenda down a winding road paved with lies, misdirection and innuendo; detectives use blood evidence to solve the shooting death of a firearms enthusiast.
108	4	"The Girl Next Door"	September 19, 2018
When a young U.S. Army veteran is found stabbed to death on his living room floor, suspicion lands on a neighbor who was arrested during an altercation; when Lt. Kenda takes a closer look at the victim's love life, he realizes someone's been lying.
109	5	"Fractured Glass"	September 26, 2018
When affable ladies' man Michael Tittemore is gunned down in the dead of night, Lt. Joe Kenda sets his sights on the roommates who were present during the murder; then, a revelation turns his attention to a far more nefarious band of suspects.
110	6	"The Cage"	October 3, 2018
Lt. Joe Kenda finds the bullet-ridden bodies of a middle-aged couple in a musty suburban house alongside the corpses of their two beloved pets; the case gets stuck in neutral until detectives discover an essential clue hidden behind a birdcage.
111	7	"Blood From a Stone"	October 10, 2018
A bystander receives a deadly head injury during a roadside altercation, but the stakes are raised when his body disappears from the scene. Then when a toddler is kidnapped for ransom, Kenda joins forces with an undercover team in a race against time.
112	8	"Target Practice"	October 17, 2018
The murder of a young father stuns his close-knit community, but the investigation reveals a neighborly dispute turned deadly; when a house is besieged by mysterious gunfire, Kenda enlists a team of specialists to trace the bullets' origin.
113	9	"The Setup"	October 24, 2018
Hardworking family man Douglas Warren stumbles into a downtown bar with a gunshot wound to the neck and bleeds out on the floor; to catch the killer, Kenda must conduct a risky sting operation and launch an interstate manhunt.
114	10	"Primal Instinct"	November 7, 2018
When a drunken dispute at a biker bar turns violent, Kenda must launch a manhunt for the suspects who have fled with a small boy in tow; a man is murdered in an onslaught of high caliber gunfire, but an unexpected break turns the case on its head.
115	11	"Follow the Money"	November 14, 2018
A 72-year-old man is found stabbed to death in a junkyard, wearing nothing but his underwear and dentures. When investigators discover a trail of purchases made with the victim's credit card, they hope it will lead them to the killer.
116	12	"Shallow Grave"	November 28, 2018
Lt. Joe Kenda and his team investigate the scene of an apparent suicide, only to be forced to flee after discovering the house is booby-trapped; teenagers discover human bones on the outskirts of town.
117	13	"Friends Like This"	January 2, 2019
A young man is gunned down outside his home after helping friends move apartments; Sgt. Joe Kenda and Detective John Anderson must determine whether the killer was a complete stranger, a gang member or a jealous lover.
118	14	"The Invisible Hand of Death"	January 9, 2019
Two teens stumble upon a woman engulfed in flames, leaving detectives to wonder just who in her inner circle could kill so cruelly. Then, when a college student is strangled in his home, Lt. Kenda must figure out which of his roommates is lying.
119	15	"Nine-Year-Old Hostage"	January 16, 2019
A hostage situation puts Sgt. Joe Kenda and his team to the test, as they try to save a family without getting shot themselves. Then, a neighbor discovers two teens who apparently entered into a suicide pact. But why does one have multiple injuries?
120	16	"Who Took Heather?"	January 16, 2019
A 13-year-old girl is missing, sending Kenda's city into a panic. Who is responsible? Just when investigators think they've got a handle on what is going on, a cryptic letter to the District Attorney's office suggests the girl isn't the only victim.
121	17	"The Shoelace Killer"	January 23, 2019
A party on the outskirts of the city turns into a nightmare for some teenagers when they discover a woman's corpse. Detectives quickly determine she was strangled with her own shoelace, but figuring out her identity proves much more challenging.
122	18	"The Uninvited Guest"	January 30, 2019
A soldier is stabbed to death at a drive-thru. Kenda's only clue is that this is somehow tied to a breakdancing competition. Then, a 29-year-old man moves back to Colorado Springs, but at his welcome home party he winds up shot execution-style.
123	19	"Married to the Job"	February 6, 2019
Sgt. Joe Kenda and his officers are facing off against a barricaded gunman when he gets an emergency call from his wife. Kathy winds up overhearing him being shot at, leading her to grapple with the terrifying realities of being married to a cop.
124	20	"The Case that Haunts Me"	February 13, 2019
A woman is found in the mountains, naked and covered in blood. As Detective Joe Kenda digs into who she is and what happened to her, he uncovers a world of violence and sexual fetishes, culminating in perhaps the most intense interrogation of his career.

=== Season 9 (2019–20) ===
No. overall	No. in season	Title	Original release date
125	1	"Cynthia"	August 28, 2019
The naked body of a vibrant young mother is found frozen solid in a deserted cemetery. When all leads dry up, the case runs cold. But years later, Kenda reopens the investigation and recognizes the sinister hallmark of a serial killer.
126	2	"Lock The Door"	September 4, 2019
Soon after the lifeless body of Charlie Tuttle was discovered behind a locked bedroom door, his death was ruled a suicide. But six months later, Kenda receives an unprompted confession that propels the case in a whole new direction.
127	3	"Confession"	September 11, 2019
After a husband and wife are viciously attacked in their own home, Kenda is on the hunt for a troubled teen whose appetite for violence knows no bounds. Then an unprecedented discovery spurs police to open up a century old murder investigation.
128	4	"Trigger"	September 18, 2019
A sharp-dressed pedestrian is shot in the back for unknown reasons; chasing a promising lead, Lt. Kenda realizes he's barking up the wrong tree; when an impromptu argument turns fatal, a suspect's guilt boils down to his skill with deadly weapons.
129	5	"Rest in Peace"	September 25, 2019
When a U.S. Air Force veteran dies unexpectedly, Lt. Joe Kenda and his team must determine whether the death was the result of a tragic accident or premeditated murder; before long, the team discovers their clean-cut victim lead a secret life.
130	6	"Down for the Count"	October 9, 2019
Hikers stumble across the brutalized corpse of amateur boxer Johnnie Wilson, hidden beneath a pile of branches; plagued by false starts and blind alleys, the case finally gains traction when investigators get their hands dirty.
131	7	"Standoff"	October 16, 2019
An unhinged divorcé with a score to settle initiates an armed standoff from the cramped confines of his trailer; a disabled man is killed on the job, and Lt. Joe Kenda's case hits a roadblock when forensic evidence is scrubbed from the scene.
132	8	"Collision Course"	October 23, 2019
Two best friends are gunned down on a dark residential street; when a string of disappointments threaten to derail the case, Lt. Joe Kenda enlists the help of an old acquaintance.
133	9	"Lady in Red"	November 6, 2019
A woman in red drops a dying man off at a firehouse and then vanishes; police soon learn the victim is a contractor with a troubled personal life, but they struggle to identify the mystery woman.
134	10	"Cradle to the Grave"	November 13, 2019
After an infant stops breathing, Kenda and Walker investigate whether the daycare is to blame or the parents themselves; Kenda works an execution-style shooting, and he is shocked to learn the victim is a kindly grandmother.
135	11	"Last Fare"	November 20, 2019
A young man is found dead behind the wheel of his taxi; since robbery seems like an unlikely motive, Kenda and Gaenzle wonder if it was personal.
136	12	"The Highway"	November 27, 2019
Kenda and Barry investigate a gun battle in a quaint family home that left one dead and two in critical condition; a woman is found beaten, strangled and stabbed on the roadside.
137	13	"To the Death"	December 4, 2019
After two young men are found shot in an apartment hallway, Lt. Joe Kenda must rely on his inner lie detector to figure out which victim is being deceptive; police investigate a murder in broad daylight and nearly get killed themselves.
138	14	"Winter's Bone"	December 18, 2019
A woman's frozen body is found along a switchback road high in the mountains above Colorado Springs, Colo; before investigators can determine who's responsible for her death, they'll need to figure out what brought her there in the first place.
139	15	"No Good Deed"	December 25, 2019
After a man is gunned down in the middle of the street, Joe Kenda must piece together a puzzle of conflicting stories and dead ends; a bloody body is discovered in a popular mall, and Kenda must make sense of the gruesome and mysterious scene.
140	16	"Fall from Grace"	January 1, 2020
Hikers come across the nude body of a man who has been bound and beaten to death; when the victim's checkered past comes to light, Joe Kenda must wade through a laundry list of potential suspects to find his killer.
141	17	"Blood Relative"	January 8, 2020
After a father is found shot in front of his home, Kenda uncovers a vengeful motive behind a deadly family feud; a church turns into a house of horrors as officers face a life-or-death decision when confronted by a knife-wielding psychopath.
142	18	"Animal Nature"	January 15, 2020
After a young woman is found murdered on the steps of a trailer, Joe Kenda and the homicide team must track down the vile perpetrators responsible for a string of cold-blooded murders.
143	19	"12 Years A Fugitive"	January 22, 2020
When a beloved grandmother is found stabbed to death in her home, Joe Kenda must turn to a grief-stricken community for help; after 12 years of searching, Kenda finally uncovers the fiendish plot to exploit the helpless victim.
144	20	"The End"	January 29, 2020
The slaying of a young boy has Lt. Joe Kenda facing his most difficult case yet; while confronting his own demons brought forth by this tragic case, the detective makes the most consequential decision of his career.

== Ratings ==
On Tuesday, November 12, 2013, during the third season, Homicide Hunter reached a new peak with 1.3 million viewers and ranking No. 8 in ad-supported cable programs. Ratings continued to grow, with the Tuesday, August 18, 2015, Season 5 premiere setting a then-record for Investigation Discovery, delivering 3.8 million viewers and making it a Top 5 cable program in its time period.

During the 2017 calendar year, which included the last seven episodes of the sixth season and the first 13 episodes of the seventh season, the series averaged 1.9 million viewers, part of a then nine-year network-wide trend of Investigation Discovery steadily increasing its ratings.
