= Colorado Springs Police Department =

Police department of Colorado Springs, Colorado

- Patch of Colorado Springs Police
- Abbreviation: CSPD

Agency overview
- Formed: November 2, 1872; 154 years ago
- Employees: 995 (2020)
- Annual budget: $141 million (2020)

Jurisdictional structure
- Operations jurisdiction: Colorado Springs, Colorado, United States
- Jurisdiction of Colorado Springs Police Department
- Area: 186.1 square miles (482 km^{2})
- Population: 472,666 (2018)
- General nature: Local civilian police

Operational structure
- Headquarters: 705 S Nevada Avenue; Colorado Springs, Colorado
- Police Officers: 680 (2022)
- Civilian employees: 498 (2020)
- Agency executive: Adrian Vasquez, Chief of Police

Facilities
- Stations: 4

Website
- Colorado Springs Police Department

The Colorado Springs Police Department locally referred to as (CSPD), is the primary police department within the confinements of the City of Colorado Springs, Colorado. Established on November 2, 1872. It is the oldest police department in the City of Colorado Springs.

The headquarters is located at 705 South Nevada Avenue, Colorado Springs, Colorado.

== History ==
In 1923, Chief Hugh D. Harper helped transfer 50,000 fingerprint files from the International Association of Chiefs of Police and government fingerprint files being kept at Leavenworth Federal Prison to the Bureau of Investigation, thereby leading to the beginning of the first lab of the FBI.

In April 1954, Chief Irvin B. "Dad" Bruce was sent to West Germany and West Berlin by the U.S. State Department, to assist in the organization of the police departments there.

In 2001, CSPD was involved in the capture and surrender of several members of the Texas Seven.

In 2002, the Colorado chapter of the American Civil Liberties Union revealed that, in conjunction with the Denver Police Department, Colorado Springs police had been spying on residents involved in nonviolent protest activity.

During the 2007 St. Patrick's Day parade, the CSPD arrested seven peace protesters in what was later alleged to be a brutal incident. All of the protesters were senior citizens. One of them, Elizabeth Fineron, was 66 and walked with the assistance of a cane. Ms. Fineron was dragged by police across the street after lying down in the road and refusing to move from the parade route, and suffered bloody abrasions from the incident.

In September 2011, two CSPD officers issued a citation to Hooters and charged a 19-year-old waitress with a misdemeanor for giving alcohol to intoxicated customers. However, further investigation revealed that the officers had ordered beers and had visited two bars prior. Surveillance cameras also revealed that the customers do not appear intoxicated and able to walk without trouble. As a result, the case against the restaurant and waitress was dismissed. CSPD has denied the allegations, but Mayor Steve Bach has ordered an investigation into the officers' conduct.

In October 2012, Officer Josh Carrier was found guilty of numerous counts of molesting boys at a middle school where he acted as a wrestling coach.

In December 2017, a woman helped save the life of a man who had overdosed by guiding another woman to give CPR and she also called 911. After giving her details as a witness, she asked for the police officer's name and badge but instead was forcibly pushed away from the scene. When she asked for a supervisor she was then arrested and cited for a misdemeanor.

In October 2022, during a traffic stop initiated by a CSPD officer, a homeless black veteran, Mr. Dalvin Gadson was arrested and hospitalized as a result of being beaten and then pulled from his vehicle. The event was captured by officers’ body cameras and footage, showing an officer with bloody hands smiling while Mr. Gadson was bloody on the ground, were shared widely on social media leading to claims of police excessive use of force and a civil suit against officers involved in the arrest.

== In popular culture ==
- BlacKkKlansman, 2018 biopic based on the memoirs of Ron Stallworth, the first African-American CSPD detective.
- Homicide Hunter, documentary series on Investigation Discovery, featuring retired CSPD homicide detective Joe Kenda.

== See also ==
- List of law enforcement agencies in Colorado
- New Life Church shooting
