= BlacKkKlansman =

2018 American film by Spike Lee

- Theatrical release poster
- Directed by: Spike Lee
- Written by: Charlie Wachtel; David Rabinowitz; Kevin Willmott; Spike Lee
- Based on: Black Klansman by Ron Stallworth
- Produced by: Jason Blum; Spike Lee; Raymond Mansfield; Sean McKittrick; Jordan Peele; Shaun Redick
- Starring: John David Washington; Adam Driver; Laura Harrier; Topher Grace
- Cinematography: Chayse Irvin
- Edited by: Barry Alexander Brown
- Music by: Terence Blanchard
- Production companies: Legendary Pictures; Perfect World Pictures; Blumhouse Productions; Monkeypaw Productions; QC Entertainment; 40 Acres and a Mule Filmworks
- Distributed by: Focus Features (United States); Universal Pictures (International)
- Release dates: May 14, 2018 (Cannes); August 10, 2018 (United States)
- Running time: 135 minutes
- Country: United States
- Language: English
- Budget: $15 million
- Box office: $93.4 million

BlacKkKlansman is a 2018 American biographical crime film directed by Spike Lee, who co-wrote the screenplay with Charlie Wachtel, David Rabinowitz, and Kevin Willmott, loosely based on the 2014 memoir Black Klansman by Ron Stallworth, the first African-American detective in the Colorado Springs Police Department, who sets out to infiltrate and expose the local Ku Klux Klan chapter. The film stars John David Washington as Stallworth, alongside Adam Driver, Laura Harrier, and Topher Grace in supporting roles. It also features Harry Belafonte's last performance before his death in April 2023.

The film was produced by Lee, Raymond Mansfield, Shaun Redick, Sean McKittrick, Jason Blum, and Jordan Peele. It was packaged by Andy Frances, Stallworth's manager. QC Entertainment purchased the film rights to the book in 2015. Lee signed on as director in September 2017. Much of the cast joined the following month, and filming began in New York State.

BlacKkKlansman premiered on May 14, 2018, at the Cannes Film Festival, where it won the Grand Prix. It was theatrically released by Focus Features in the United States on August 10, 2018, with Universal Pictures releasing in other territories, to critical acclaim, with praise for Lee's direction, the performances (particularly of Washington and Driver), and timely themes. Critics noted it as a return to form for Lee. It received six nominations at the 91st Academy Awards, including Best Picture, and won for Best Adapted Screenplay, Lee's first competitive Oscar. The American Film Institute also selected it as a top 10 film of 2018. At the 76th Golden Globe Awards, it earned four nominations, including Best Motion Picture – Drama.

== Plot ==
In 1972, Ron Stallworth is hired as the first ever black officer in the Colorado Springs Police Department. Assigned to work in the records room, he tires of being bullied and applies to be an undercover officer. He is assigned to infiltrate a local rally where national civil rights leader Kwame Ture (a.k.a. Stokely Carmichael) is speaking. At the rally, Ron meets Patrice Dumas, president of the Black Student Union at Colorado College. While taking Ture to his hotel, Patrice is stopped by patrolman Andy Landers, a racist officer in Ron's precinct, who threatens Ture and gropes Patrice.

Following the rally, Ron is reassigned to the intelligence division. After reading about a local division of the Ku Klux Klan in the newspaper, he calls posing as a white man. He speaks with Walter Breachway, the president of the Colorado Springs chapter, but soon realizes that not only did he use his real name, but he must also meet the Klan members. Ron recruits his Jewish coworker, Flip Zimmerman, to impersonate him and meet the KKK members while he continues posing as white on the phone. Under Ron's identity, Flip meets Walter, the slightly more reckless and unstable Felix Kendrickson (and later his wife Connie), and Ivanhoe, who cryptically refers to an upcoming terrorist attack.

Calling Ku Klux Klan headquarters in Louisiana to expedite his membership, Ron begins regular phone conversations with Grand Wizard David Duke. Felix suspects Flip of being Jewish and tries to force him to take a polygraph test at gunpoint, but Ron, overhearing everything on the wire Flip is wearing, breaks the Kendricksons' kitchen window as a distraction. Ron begins dating Patrice without telling her that he is a police officer. After passing information to an Army CID Special Agent about active-duty members, he learns from the agent that two members are personnel stationed at NORAD, a critical, high-security defense facility.

Duke visits Colorado Springs for "Ron"'s induction into the Klan. Over Ron's protests, he is assigned to a protection detail for Duke. Once Flip, masquerading as Ron, is initiated, Connie leaves the ceremony to place an explosive device at a local civil rights rally. Ron realizes her intentions and alerts local police officers. When Connie notices a heavy police presence at the rally, she puts Felix's backup plan into action and plants the bomb at Patrice's house, leaving it under her car when it will not fit into the mailbox. Ron tackles her as she tries to flee, but uniformed white officers detain and beat him despite his protests that he is working undercover, while Connie hysterically claims Ron was trying to rape her.

The bombmaker, Walker, had recognized Flip from a prior arrest and informed Felix at the Klan reception. He, Felix, and Ivanhoe drive to Patrice's house and park next to her car without realizing that the bomb is hidden underneath. When they detonate it, the explosion kills all three. Flip arrives, frees Ron, and arrests Connie.

While Ron is celebrating the closed case that night with Patrice, Landers arrives and drunkenly harasses the two, remorselessly admitting to his earlier assault on her. Ron reveals he is wearing a wire, and Police Chief Bridges arrives and arrests Landers for police brutality.

Bridges congratulates the team for their success but orders them to end their investigation and destroy the records. Ron receives a call from Duke, and he insultingly tells Duke he is black before hanging up.

Later, while Patrice and Ron discuss their future, they are interrupted by a knock on the door. Through the window in the hallway, they see a flaming cross on a hillside surrounded by KKK members.

The film cuts to footage of the 2017 Unite the Right rally, in which a hit and run attack killed a counter-protester and injured several others, part of a speech by David Duke, and comments by President Donald Trump praising "very fine people on both sides" of the rally. It ends with a dedication to Heather Heyer (who was killed in the attack) and lastly, shows an upside-down American flag fading to a black-and-white American flag, before fading to black.

== Cast ==
- John David Washington as Detective Ron Stallworth
- Adam Driver as Detective Philip "Flip" Zimmerman
- Laura Harrier as Patrice Dumas
- Topher Grace as David Duke
- Corey Hawkins as Kwame Ture
- Harry Belafonte as Jerome Turner
- Jasper Pääkkönen as Felix Kendrickson
- Ryan Eggold as Walter Breachway
- Frederick Weller as Patrolman Andy Landers
- Paul Walter Hauser as Ivanhoe
- Ashlie Atkinson as Connie Kendrickson
- Michael Buscemi as Jimmy Creek
- Ken Garito as Sergeant Trapp
- Robert John Burke as Chief Bridges
- Alec Baldwin as Dr. Kennebrew Beauregard
- Isiah Whitlock Jr. as Mr. Turrentine
- Nicholas Turturro as Walker
- Damaris Lewis as Odetta

== Production ==
=== Development and casting ===
In July 2015, screenwriters/co-producers Charlie Wachtel and David Rabinowitz discovered the book Black Klansman by Ron Stallworth. They interviewed Stallworth and wrote a spec screenplay, then pitched the script to producers Shaun Redick and Ray Mansfield. They brought the property to QC Entertainment, which had co-produced the successful 2017 film Get Out. QC again teamed up with Jason Blum's company Blumhouse Productions, and Jordan Peele's company Monkeypaw Productions, to produce the project.

In September of that year, Spike Lee signed on as director and John David Washington was in negotiations to star. The following month, Adam Driver, Laura Harrier, Topher Grace, and Corey Hawkins had joined the cast. In November, Paul Walter Hauser, Jasper Pääkkönen, and Ryan Eggold joined the cast, with Ashlie Atkinson joining a month later.

=== Filming ===
Filming began in October 2017. Ossining, New York, was one location used in October. Filming locations also included the Rockland County hamlet of Garnerville, New York, where exterior shots of one of the Colorado Springs police stations were filmed.

Eyewitness footage from the Charlottesville car attack was used in the film's ending sequence

Harry Belafonte appears in the film in a cameo (and in his final film role) as an activist recounting the lynching of Jesse Washington; according to Lee, he commanded his crew on the day of filming Belafonte's scene to dress for the occasion in suits and dresses to honor Belafonte.

Lee ends the film with a tribute to anti-fascist counter-protester Heather Heyer, who was killed on August 12, 2017, in the Charlottesville car attack during the Unite the Right rally.

== Release ==
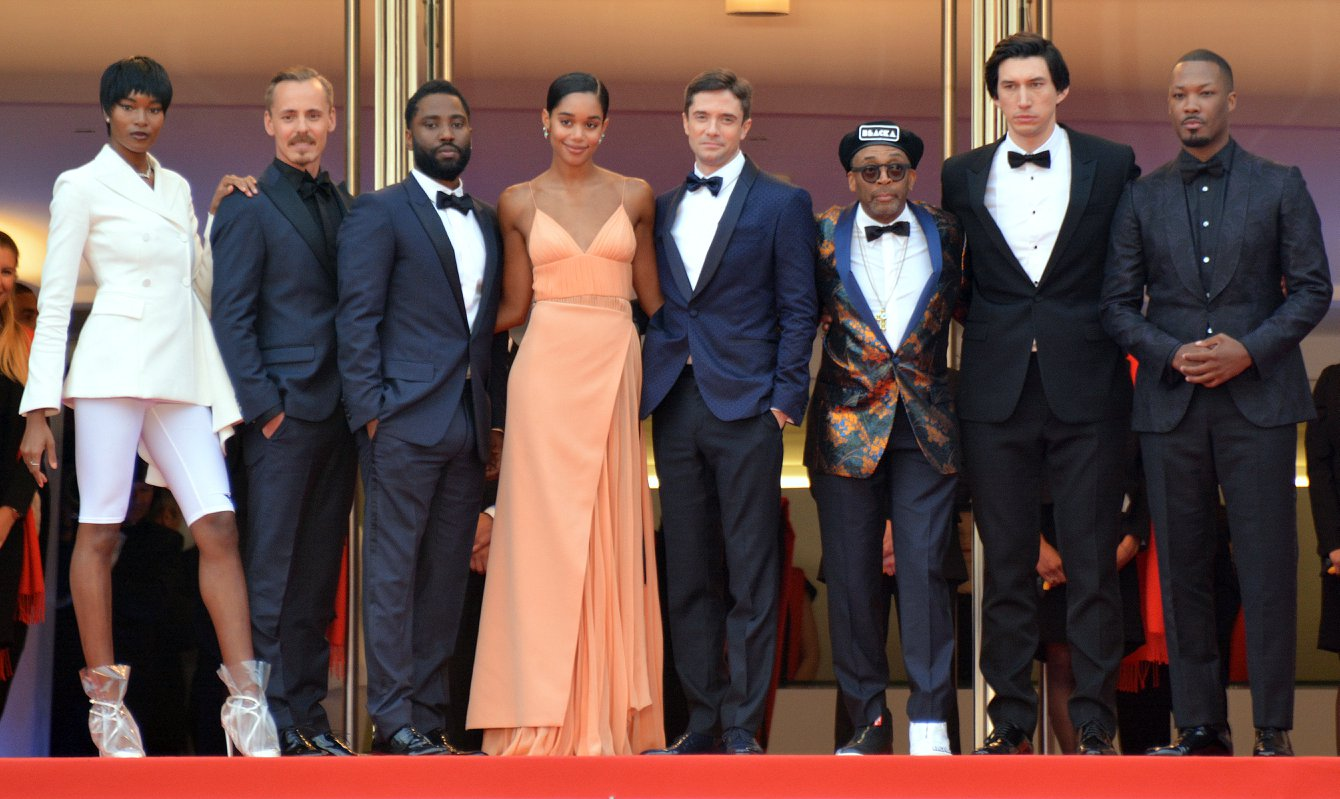
Lee and the cast at the 2018 Cannes Film Festival

On April 12, 2018, the film was selected to compete for the Palme d'Or at the 2018 Cannes Film Festival, where it premiered on May 14. It opened in the United States on August 10, 2018, which was chosen to coincide with the one-year anniversary of the Charlottesville rally.

== Reception ==
=== Box office ===
BlacKkKlansman grossed $49.3 million in the United States and Canada, and $44.1 million in other territories, for a total worldwide gross of $93.4 million, against a production budget of $15 million.

In the United States and Canada, BlacKkKlansman was released, and was projected to gross around $10 million from 1,512 theaters in its opening weekend. It made $3.6 million on its first day (including $670,000 from Thursday night previews). It went on to debut to $10.8 million, finishing fifth at the box office and marking Lee's best opening weekend since Inside Man ($29 million) in 2006. It made $7.4 million in its second weekend and $5.3 million in its third, finishing seventh and eighth, respectively.

=== Critical response ===
On Rotten Tomatoes, the film has an approval rating of 96% based on 450 reviews, with an average rating of 8.3/10. The website's critical consensus reads, "BlacKkKlansman uses history to offer bitingly trenchant commentary on current events—and brings out some of Spike Lee's hardest-hitting work in decades along the way." On Metacritic, the film has a weighted average score of 83 out of 100, based on 56 critics, indicating "universal acclaim". Audiences polled by CinemaScore gave the film an average grade of "A−" on an A+ to F scale, while PostTrak reported filmgoers gave it an 85% positive score and a 67% "definite recommend".

Peter Bradshaw of The Guardian gave the film three out of five stars, writing: "It's an entertaining spectacle but the brilliant tonal balance in something like Jordan Peele's satire Get Out leaves this looking a little exposed. Yet it responds fiercely, contemptuously to the crassness at the heart of the Trump regime and gleefully pays it back in its own coin". For IndieWire, David Ehrlich gave the film a grade of "B+" and wrote that it is "far more frightening than it is funny", and "packages such weighty and ultra-relevant subjects into the form of a wildly uneven but consistently entertaining night at the movies".

A. O. Scott, writing for The New York Times, saw the film as both political and provocative in opening up discussion on timely subject matter following Charlottesville. He stated, "Committed anti-racists can sit quietly or laugh politely when hateful things are said. Epithets uttered in irony can be repeated in earnest. The most shocking thing about Flip's (Adam Driver's undercover detective role) imposture is how easy it seems, how natural he looks and sounds. This unnerving authenticity is partly testament to Mr. Driver's ability to tuck one performance inside another, but it also testifies to a stark and discomforting truth. Maybe not everyone who is white is a racist, but racism is what makes us white. Don't sleep on this movie."

In his review of the film for Vulture, David Edelstein found the film to be a potent antidote for previous films that Lee sees as unduly supportive of the racist viewpoint in the past, such as Griffith's The Birth of a Nation. Edelstein stated: "Lee himself has a propagandist streak, and he knows nothing ever sold the message of white emasculation and the existential necessity of keeping blacks down as well as Griffith's 1915 film. It revived the Klan and—insult to injury—is still reckoned a landmark of narrative filmmaking. If there were no other reason to make BlackkKlansman, this one would be good enough."

Filmmaker Martin Scorsese praised the film, saying "The picture takes you to a safe place — we're watching a movie, it's up on a screen — and suddenly we're catapulted into now ... Right next to you. Because it's not only real, what you're seeing up there on the screen — it's happening. It is happening. And it's sanctioned by government...It transcends the medium, what he did there in the last 10 minutes. It's cinema and it's beautiful."

Filmmaker Boots Riley, whose feature film debut Sorry to Bother You also premiered in 2018, criticized the film for its political perspective. While Riley called the craft of the film "masterful" and cited Lee as a major influence on his own work, he felt that the film was dishonestly marketed as a true story and criticized its attempts to "make a cop the protagonist in the fight against racist oppression", when Black Americans face structural racism "from the police on a day-to-day basis". In particular, Riley alleged that the film glossed over Stallworth's time spent working for COINTELPRO to "sabotage a Black radical organization" and objected to the film's choices to portray Stallworth's partner as Jewish and to fictionalize a bombing "to make the police seem like heroes". Lee responded in an interview with The Times on August 24, stating that while his films "have been very critical of the police ... I'm never going to say that all police are corrupt, that all police hate people of color."

=== Accolades ===
BlacKkKlansman won the Grand Prix at the Cannes Film Festival. It was subsequently nominated for four Golden Globes, including Best Motion Picture – Drama. Lee was nominated for Outstanding Feature Film by the Directors Guild of America and the producers were nominated for the Producers Guild of America Award for Best Theatrical Motion Picture.

The film was also nominated for four Critics Choice Awards, including Best Picture, seven Satellite Awards, including Best Director for Lee, and is nominated for the Independent Spirit Award for Best Supporting Male for Driver, and three Screen Actors Guild Awards, including Outstanding Male Actor for Washington. The American Film Institute also included it in its Top 10 Films of the Year.

BlacKkKlansman was nominated for six Academy Awards and won Best Adapted Screenplay. Nominations included Best Picture, Lee for Best Director, and Driver for Best Supporting Actor. The film was also nominated for Best Film Editing and composer Terence Blanchard was nominated for Best Original Score.

In 2021, members of Writers Guild of America West (WGAW) and Writers Guild of America, East (WGAE) voted the film's screenplay 90th in WGA’s 101 Greatest Screenplays of the 21st Century (so far).

== Historical accuracy ==
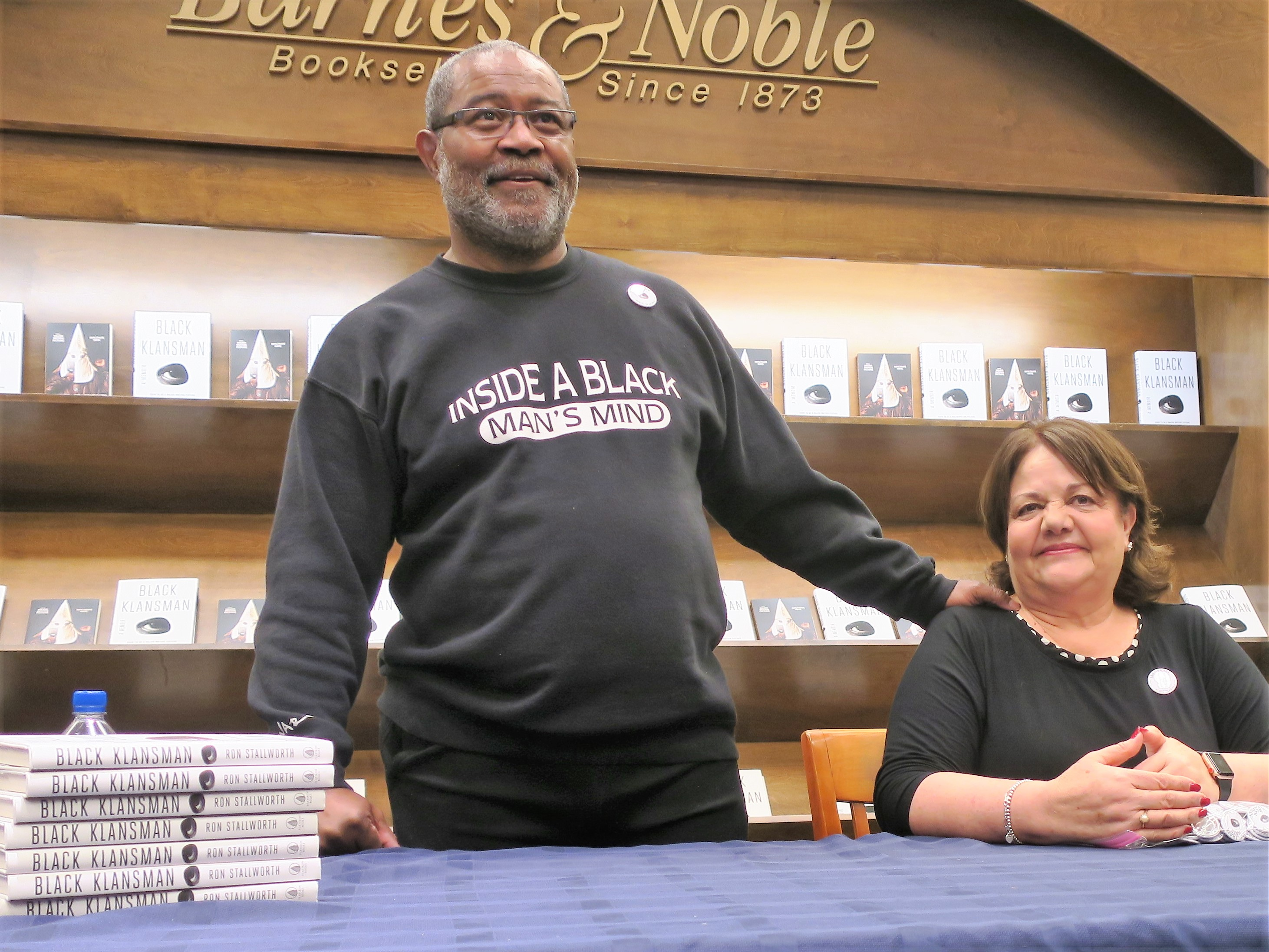
The real-life Ron Stallworth at a book signing in February 2019

Although based on a true story, the film dramatizes and fictionalizes several events, with usage of fictional characters and altered timelines. For example, though underlying conversations between Klan members about potential firebombings were overheard, no bombing actually took place. The character of Patrice is also entirely fictitious. Stallworth however was indeed hired as part of David Duke's security, and the scene of the two men getting a photograph together did in fact happen, though Stallworth says he lost the photo after he moved house.

Stallworth stated in an interview with TIME that the movie “did justice to the story,” but made it clear that the final scene was “a composite of events.” Stallworth also made it clear that he never revealed himself to the Klan, and David Duke did not know that Stallworth was black until an exposé was written on his career in 2006.

== See also ==
- List of black films of the 2010s
- Racism against African Americans
