= The Naked City =

1948 American crime procedural film by Jules Dassin

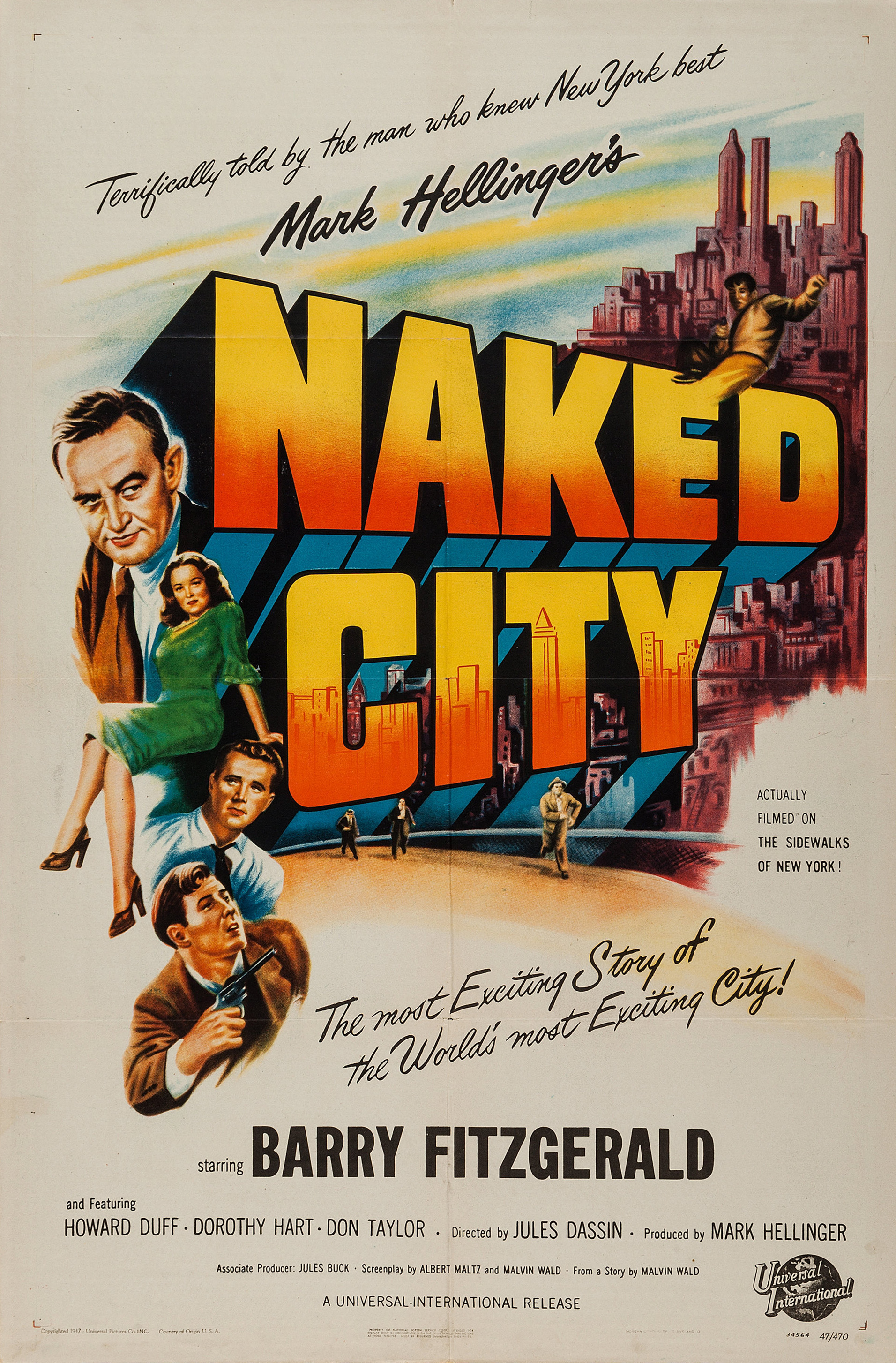
- Theatrical release poster
- Directed by: Jules Dassin
- Screenplay by: Albert Maltz; Malvin Wald
- Story by: Malvin Wald
- Produced by: Mark Hellinger
- Starring: Barry Fitzgerald; Howard Duff; Dorothy Hart; Don Taylor
- Narrated by: Mark Hellinger
- Cinematography: William H. Daniels
- Edited by: Paul Weatherwax
- Music by: Miklós Rózsa; Frank Skinner
- Production company: Mark Hellinger Productions
- Distributed by: Universal-International
- Release date: March 4, 1948 (US)
- Running time: 96 minutes
- Country: United States
- Language: English
- Box office: $2.4 million

The Naked City (a.k.a. Naked City) is a 1948 American crime procedural produced by Mark Hellinger; directed by Jules Dassin; and written by Albert Maltz and Malvin Wald, from a story by Wald. Starring Barry Fitzgerald, with Howard Duff, Dorothy Hart, and Don Taylor in support, the film depicts the police investigation that follows the murder of a young model. It was shot almost entirely on location in New York City.

Naked City received two Academy Awards, one for cinematography for William H. Daniels and another for film editing to Paul Weatherwax. In 2007, the highly influential film was selected for preservation in the United States National Film Registry by the Library of Congress as being "culturally, historically, or aesthetically significant".

== Plot ==
On a hot New York summer night, two men chloroform ex-model Jean Dexter and drown her in her bathtub. When one of them gets conscience-stricken while drunk, the other kills him and throws his body into the East River.

Experienced New York City Police Department detective Lt. Dan Muldoon and novice Det. Jimmy Halloran are assigned to the case. At the scene the medical examiner determines the “accidental” death had actually been murder. A pair of men's pajamas yields only the name “Philip Henderson” from her housekeeper, who reports that Dexter's hoard of expensive jewelry is missing. A bottle of sleeping pills leads Halloran to the doctor who prescribed them, Lawrence Stoneman. Ruth Morrison, a model friend of Jean's, is also located and questioned.

At the precinct, Muldoon interrogates Frank Niles, Jean's ex-boyfriend, who claims only a business relationship with Jean and denies knowing Ruth, although the pair are actually engaged. He lies himself into becoming the prime murder suspect, but has an airtight alibi. Later, Muldoon deduces from the bruises on Jean's neck that she was killed by at least two men.

The detectives learn that Niles has just sold an expensive cigarette case stolen from Stoneman, then purchased a one-way airline ticket to Mexico City. They also discover that one of Jean's rings was stolen from the home of a Mrs. Hylton. At the matron's Park Avenue apartment, the police learn that the ring actually belonged to her socialite daughter from a previous marriage, who, to their surprise, is Ruth Morrison.

Finding that Ruth's engagement ring was stolen in a different robbery, Muldoon and Halloran take Ruth to Niles' apartment. There they interrupt someone attempting to chloroform him, who shoots his way down the fire escape and disappears onto an elevated train. When questioned about the stolen jewelry, Niles claims he had gotten everything as gifts from Jean. Realizing she is engaged to a pathological liar and a criminal, Ruth slaps him. Niles is then arrested for the jewel thefts, but remains silent regarding his attacker.

The body of small-time jewel thief Peter Backalis is found in the East River, having been murdered within hours of Jean; Halloran suspects the two killings are connected. Muldoon, although skeptical, lets Halloran pursue the lead and assigns two veteran detectives already on the case to assist. Through considerable legwork they learn that Backalis' last known accomplice had been Willie Garzah, a former wrestler who plays the harmonica. While Halloran and his team canvass the Lower East Side with an old publicity photograph of him, Muldoon demands Niles identify Jean's mystery boyfriend. He reveals that "Henderson" is the same Dr. Stoneman, a married society physician. At Stoneman's office, Muldoon uses Niles to trap the doctor into implicating himself. Stoneman confesses that he became obsessed with Jean only to learn that she and Niles were using him in order to rob his wealthy friends. Niles then admits to planning the thefts, but says Backalis and Garzah did the jobs; denied a larger cut, they killed Jean.

On his own, Halloran locates Garzah and unsuccessfully tries to take him into custody, but Garzah knocks him out and flees. As the police descend on the neighborhood to organize a dragnet, Garzah attempts to blend into the crowd, but becomes paranoid and shoots a guide dog belonging to a blind man when it bites him at the Williamsburg Bridge, within earshot of the police's rallying point. The police chase Garzah along the bridge's footpaths and seal off both ends, forcing him to climb one of the towers. Injured by a police bullet and cornered, Garzah shoots at the police, who return fire, fatally wounding him before he plummets off the tower.

The next day, the people involved in the case live with the aftermath. In Times Square, a trashman sweeps a gutter of yesterday's newspapers, and with them the Jean Dexter case. A concluding voiceover states, "There are eight million stories in the naked city. This has been one of them."

== Cast ==
- Barry Fitzgerald as Detective Lt. Dan Muldoon
- Howard Duff as Frank Niles
- Dorothy Hart as Ruth Morrison
- Don Taylor as Detective Jimmy Halloran
- Frank Conroy as Captain Donahue
- Ted de Corsia as Willie Garzah
- House Jameson as Dr. Lawrence Stoneman
- Anne Sargent as Mrs. Halloran
- Adelaide Klein as Mrs. Paula Batory
- Grover Burgess as Mr. Batory
- Tom Pedi as Detective Perelli
- Enid Markey as Mrs. Edgar Hylton
- Mark Hellinger as Narrator (voice)
- Arthur O'Connell as Sgt. Shaeffer (uncredited)
- James Gregory as Ptl. Albert Hicks (uncredited)
- John McQuade as Det. Dace Constantino (uncredited)
- David Opatoshu as Sgt. Dave Miller (uncredited)
- Curt Conway as Det. Nick (uncredited)
- Virginia Mullen as Martha Swenson (uncredited)
- Paul Ford as Henry Fowler (uncredited)
- Walter Burke as Pete Backalis (uncredited)
- Beverly Bayne as Mrs. Stoneman (uncredited)
- John Randolph as police dispatcher (uncredited)
- Bruce Gordon as cop at the Williamsburg Bridge (uncredited)
- Lee Shumway as patrolman (uncredited)
- Molly Picon as soda-selling shopkeeper (uncredited)
- John Marley as managing editor (uncredited)
- Kathleen Freeman as woman on train (uncredited)
- Celia Adler as dress shop proprietress (uncredited)
- Nehemiah Persoff as man departing subway (uncredited)

== Production ==
Publicity stills from The Naked City

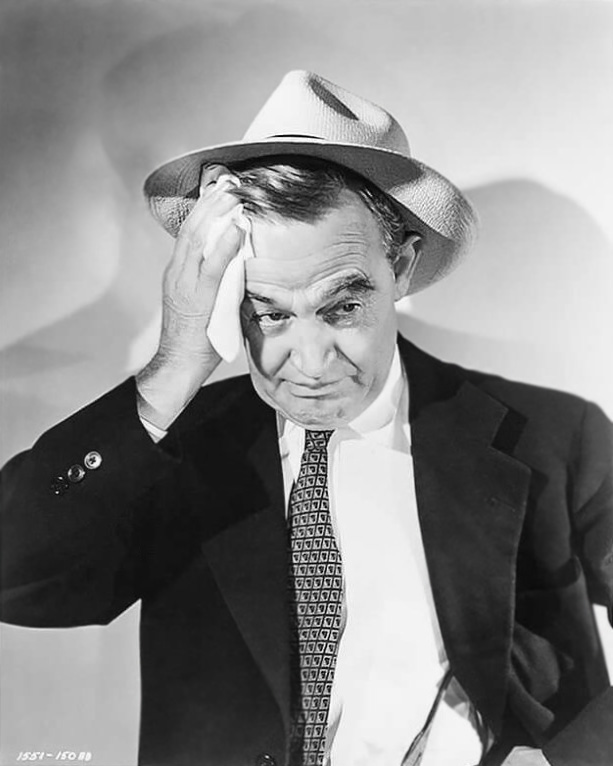
Barry Fitzgerald

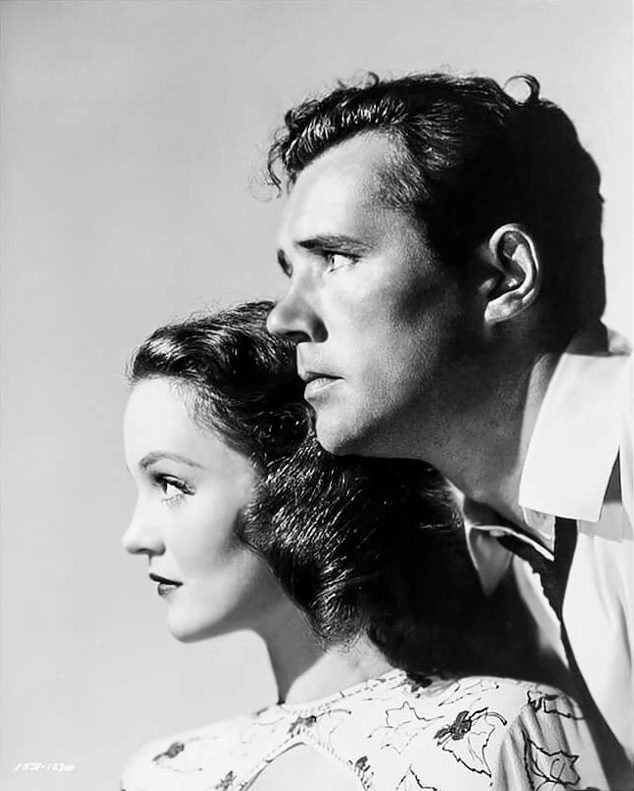
Dorothy Hart and Howard Duff

The visual style of The Naked City was inspired by New York photographer Weegee, who published a book of photographs of New York life titled Naked City (1945). Weegee was hired as a visual consultant on the film, and is credited with helping to craft its imagery. But film historian William Park has argued that, despite Weegee's work on the film and its title coming from Weegee's earlier work, the film owes its visual style more to Italian neorealism rather than Weegee's photographic work.

The musical scoring process was contentious. Hellinger allowed Dassin to assign a former M-G-M colleague, the arranger George Bassman, to compose the music. Hellinger found this so unsatisfactory that, on the night before he died, he begged his own first choice, Miklós Rózsa, to step in. Rózsa concentrated on the climactic chase and epilogue, while Frank Skinner scored the early scenes. Rózsa later compiled a "Mark Hellinger Suite" of music from his three Hellinger pictures (including The Killers and Brute Force). The Naked City epilogue, "Song of a Great City", was Rózsa's tribute to the producer.

The movie features the uncredited film debuts of Kathleen Freeman, Bruce Gordon, James Gregory, Nehemiah Persoff, and John Randolph in small roles. Randolph, along with Paul Ford who also had a small part, were appearing at the time on the New York stage in Command Decision. John Marley, Arthur O'Connell, David Opatoshu, and Celia Adler had small, uncredited roles.

Producer Mark Hellinger, who also narrated the film, was only 44 when he died of a heart attack on December 21, 1947, after reviewing the final cut of the film at his home.

== Reception ==
=== Box office ===
The film made $2,400,000 and was a considerable hit at the box office.

=== Critical reception ===
New York Times film critic Bosley Crowther, while having problems both with the script and Dassin's direction, liked the location shooting and wrote, "Thanks to the actuality filming of much of its action in New York, a definite parochial fascination is liberally assured all the way and the seams in a none-too-good whodunnit are rather cleverly concealed. And thanks to a final, cops-and-robbers 'chase' through East Side Manhattan and on the Williamsburg Bridge, a generally talkative mystery story is whipped up to a roaring 'Hitchcock' end." In The Nation in 1948, critic James Agee wrote, "Photographed by William Daniels—who shot Greed—with a lovely eye for space, size, and light. A visually majestic finish. Otherwise, mawkish and naive."

In July 2018, the film was selected to be screened in the Venice Classics section at the 75th Venice International Film Festival.

=== Awards and honors ===
Wins

- Academy Awards: Oscar, Best Cinematography, Black-and-White, William H. Daniels; Best Film Editing, Paul Weatherwax; 1949.

Nominations

- Academy Awards: Oscar, Best Writing, Motion Picture Story, Malvin Wald; 1949.
- British Academy of Film and Television Arts: BAFTA Film Award, Best Film from any Source, USA; 1949.
- Writers Guild of America: WGA Award (Screen), Best Written American Drama, Albert Maltz and Malvin Wald; The Robert Meltzer Award (Screenplay Dealing Most Ably with Problems of the American Scene), Albert Maltz and Malvin Wald; 1949.

== Adaptations ==
- The film was the inspiration for a half-hour Naked City television series, which used the film's famous concluding line. The characters of Muldoon and Halloran initially returned in the series, played by John McIntire and James Franciscus. The series ran for a single season in 1958 to 1959, earning an Emmy Award nomination as Best Drama. It was resurrected in Fall 1960 as an hour-long drama, which ran from October 1960 to September 1963.
- The film inspired two television films, Naked City: Justice with a Bullet and Naked City: A Killer Christmas, starring Scott Glenn as Muldoon and Courtney B. Vance as Halloran. They aired on Showtime in October and December 1998 respectively.
- The film is the inspiration for a mission of the same name in the Rockstar game L.A. Noire, in which the main character and his partner investigate the murder of a model. Similar to the film, the victim is killed by two assailants (one of whom later kills the other), is made to look like she had drowned, and it is the coroner that recognizes her death as a murder. In the game, a Dr. Stoneman is responsible for providing the victim with drug prescriptions, and whose obsession is taken advantage of by the victim, who uses him to aid in robberies. The dress shop where the victim works in the game is called D'Assine, after the director of the movie Jules Dassin.
