= Orpheus's Song =

2019 German LGBTQ+ romantic drama film

- Theatrical film poster
- German: Orfeos Traum
- Directed by: Tor Iben
- Written by: Tor Iben
- Produced by: Tor Iben
- Starring: Sascha Weingarten; Julien Lickert
- Cinematography: Manuel Ruge
- Edited by: Tor Iben; Markus Morkötter
- Music by: Stefan Block; Cesar Espinoza; Wenzel Krah; William Kudahl Sørensen
- Release dates: June 23, 2019 (USA); February 10, 2020 (Germany)
- Running time: 75 minutes
- Country: Germany
- Languages: German; English

Orpheus's Song (German: Orfeos Traum) is a 2019 Germany LGBTQ+ romantic drama film, directed by Tor Iben. The film stars Sascha Weingarten and Julien Lickert. It premiered at the Out Here Now LGBT Film Festival in 2019, before being in limited theatrical release in select cities throughout the Germany the following year.

== Synopsis ==
Two best friends from Berlin win a trip to Greece. On their excursion, they get lost on an island. They spend the night together in a cave and dream a mystical dream. On the next day, nothing between the two will be like it was before.

== Cast ==
- Sascha Weingarten as Philipp Mankowski
- Julien Lickert as Enis Beckmann
- Yonatan Berman as Orpheus
- Henry Morales as Hercules
- Kristina Kostiv as Kristina
- Stefanie Alder as Trainer

== Reception ==
Daniel Jiménez of Letterboxd opined overall: "It takes inspiration from several genres but without landing on any of them, the result is a bleak movie with a weird pacing." Ricky Blue of Letterboxd chided the tone: "All the prologue which is basically like the first half of the movie is fairly dull. Honestly I would say that it feels like watching a porn with all of the sex removed. It's that kind of production. But once they get on the island and out into nature it becomes more watchable."
