= Linda Ravin Lodding =

American children's book author

Linda Ravin Lodding is an American/Swedish author who published 11 children's books which were translated into multiple languages.

In 2012 she was awarded the Comstock-Gág Read Aloud book award. for the book The Busy Life of Ernestine Buckmeister.

== Biography ==
Ravin Lodding is originally from New York, but has spent the past 25 years in Austria, the Netherlands and now lives in Stockholm, Sweden.

Ravin Lodding has an BA in English from Barnard College, Columbia University, and an MBA from Stern School of Business, New York University.

Ravin Lodding works as Head of Communications for Global Child Forum, a Swedish Royal foundation with a focus on children's rights within the corporate sector.

== Publications ==
Her first book, The Busy Life of Ernestine Buckmeister was read online in 2022 by Connie Britton on the Sag-Aftra foundation's children's literacy website, Storyline Online

The book A Gift for Mama was selected as a notable book in the New York Times.

————— (2026). It started with a book ban. Illustrated by Aaron Cushley. Chicago, Illinois: Albert Whitman & Company. ISBN 9780807536810.

————— (2025). Babies are not bears. Illustrated by Lara Dombret. New Rochelle, NY: Reycraft Books. ISBN 9781478883272.

————— (2023). When we had to leave home. Illustrated by Anna Aronson. Chicago, Illinois: Albert Whitman & Company. ISBN 978-0807574812. OCLC 1373874313.

————— (2023). Flipflopi: how a boat made from flip-flops is helping to save the ocean. Illustrated by Michael Machira Mwangi. Minneapolis: Beaming Books. ISBN 978-1-506-48640-6. OCLC 1332780980.

————— (2017). Wakey, Eakey, Elephant!. Illustrated by Michael Robertson. New York: Sterling's Children's Books. ISBN 978-1-454-91999-5. OCLC 973480580.

————— (2017). Little Red Riding Sheep. Illustrated by Cale Atkinson. New York: Simon & Schuster Children's Publishing. ISBN 978-1-481-45748-4. OCLC 1142696784.

————— (2017). The Queen Is Coming to Tea. Illustrated by Constanze Von Kitzing. Naperville, Illinois: Sourcebooks Jabberwocky. ISBN 978-1-492-60759-5. OCLC 973327244.

————— (2016). Painting Pepette. Illustrated by Claire Fletcher. New York: Little Bee Books. ISBN 978-1-499-80136-1. OCLC 923565312.

————— (2017). Hold that thought, Milton!. Illustrated by Ross Collins. Bath: Parragon Book Ltd. ISBN 978-1-472-33199-1. OCLC 980362056.

————— (2014). A Gift For Mama. Illustrated by Jay Alison. New York: Alfred A. Knopf. ISBN 978-0-385-75331-9. OCLC 829645892.

————— (2011). The busy life of Ernestine Buckmeister. Illustrated by Suzanne Beaky. Brooklyn, NY: Flashlight Press. ISBN 978-1-936261-65-9. OCLC 905228012.
