= Mates (2023 film) =

2023 British drama film

- Theatrical film poster
- Directed by: Arno Crous
- Written by: Arno Crous
- Produced by: Arno Crous
- Starring: James Wiles; Jonathan Cobb
- Cinematography: Moritz Oskar Meyer
- Edited by: Arno Crous
- Music by: Alexander Blinko; Timothy Blinko
- Release dates: August 11, 2023 (UK/USA); January 14, 2025 (Germany)
- Running time: 81 mins.
- Country: United Kingdom
- Language: English

Mates is a 2023 British independent romantic drama film written and directed by Arno Crous. The film stars James Wiles, Jonathan Cobb, Rafe Bird, Sam Law, and Steevan Glover. It premiered in the UK in 2023.

== Synopsis ==
An unsuspecting man becomes the target of another guy's efforts at seduction.

== Cast ==
- James Wiles as Connor
- Jonathan Cobb as Adam
- Sam Law as Nathan
- Rafe Bird as Mark
- Steevan Glover as John

== Reception ==
James R. De Roxtra of Letterboxd rated it 2/5 stars and opined: "A rather dry, plodding narrative that goes nowhere slowly." Oscar Fidel Atunez Martinez of PubMed commended the film: "Lastly, the film serves as a poignant reminder of the resilience within the LGBTQ+ community and the ongoing need for comprehensive support systems to facilitate acceptance, empathy, and inclusion."
