= The Adventures of Huck Finn (1993 film) =

1993 film produced by Walt Disney Pictures

- Theatrical release poster
- Directed by: Stephen Sommers
- Screenplay by: Stephen Sommers
- Based on: Adventures of Huckleberry Finn; 1884 novel by Mark Twain
- Produced by: Laurence Mark
- Starring: Elijah Wood; Courtney B. Vance; Robbie Coltrane; Jason Robards
- Cinematography: Janusz Kamiński
- Edited by: Bob Ducsay
- Music by: Bill Conti
- Production company: Walt Disney Pictures
- Distributed by: Buena Vista Pictures Distribution
- Release date: April 2, 1993
- Running time: 108 minutes
- Country: United States
- Language: English
- Budget: $11 million
- Box office: $24.1 million

The Adventures of Huck Finn is a 1993 American comedy drama adventure film written and directed by Stephen Sommers, and starring Elijah Wood, Courtney B. Vance, Jason Robards and Robbie Coltrane. Distributed by Walt Disney Studios Motion Pictures and Buena Vista Pictures, it is based on Mark Twain's 1884 novel Adventures of Huckleberry Finn and focuses on at least three-quarters of the book.

The film follows a boy named Huckleberry Finn and an escaped slave named Jim, who travel the Mississippi River together and overcome various obstacles along the way.

== Plot ==
Huckleberry Finn is a half-literate son of Pap Finn, an abusive drunk. One night, his father arrives and takes Huck from his foster family. Jealous of Huck's money being kept away, Pap attacks Huck, but eventually passes out from exhaustion.

Huck fakes his own death and runs away. He is accompanied by Jim, a slave who worked for Huck's foster family and escaped after a slave trader offered to buy him. The duo follow the Mississippi River to Cairo, Illinois, so Jim can escape to freedom without being arrested.

They come across a wanted poster for Jim, falsely saying that he murdered Huck. Jim and Huck find a sinking barge one night, and Jim notices Huck's father dead on the ship. Huck notices two robbers leaving another to drown in a room as the water comes crashing through. Huck and Jim's canoe sinks, but they steal the robbers' raft as the barge completely sinks underwater.

The raft is later struck by a steamboat, and Huck is at first captured by a few men, then taken to the home of the Graingerford family. Huck lies about his life to the Graingerfords to avoid suspicion. The Graingerfords are in a feud with another family, the Shepherdsons. Huck even befriends Billy Graingerford, the Graingerford patriarch's son, but is horrified that Jim has been found by the family and become a slave again. Billy's older sister Sophie runs away to marry a Shepherdson, thus a short firefight happens, killing all the male Graingerfords, including Billy.

Jim and Huck find themselves past Cairo, and two con men, the Duke and the King, join them. The quartet land at Phelps Landing, and the King and the Duke impersonate British members of the Wilks family to con three sisters -- Mary Jane, Julia, and Susan -- out of their fortune.

Meanwhile, Jim has been taken to prison for Huck's murder, and tells Huck about his father's death. Huck rebukes Jim and puts the money in the coffin of a recently deceased Wilkes family member. He exposes the King and the Duke as con men to Mary Jane the next day, and asks her not to tell the town until 10:00 that night, when a steamboat to Cairo departs.

Dr. Robinson does not trust the King and the Duke's scheme, and the real members of the family whom they were impersonating show up. The town dig up the buried coffin where the money was put, and thus tar and feather the Duke and the King, and become an angry mob. Huck breaks Jim out of prison, but they are spotted by the mob.

While escaping, Huck is shot in the back. Jim sacrifices his chance to escape to freedom and carries Huck to the mob, allowing himself to be hanged. Before the mob can kill Jim, however, the Wilks sisters arrive and stop them. The mob set Jim free, and Huck passes out.

Huck wakes up in the Wilks homestead and learns that Jim's master Miss Watson, who was also one of Huck's caretakers, has died and set Jim free in her will. The other caretaker, the Widow Douglas, plans on civilizing Huck, but Huck, narrating the story, says, "I've been there before." The film ends with Huck running off into the sunset.

== Cast ==
- Elijah Wood as Huckleberry "Huck" Finn
- Courtney B. Vance as Jim
- Robbie Coltrane as the Duke
- Jason Robards as the King
- Ron Perlman as Pap Finn
- Dana Ivey as Widow Douglas
- Anne Heche as Mary Jane Wilks
- James Gammon as Deputy Hines
- Paxton Whitehead as Harvey Wilks
- Tom Aldredge as Dr. Robinson
- Laura Bell Bundy as Susan Wilks
- Curtis Armstrong as Country Jake
- Mary Louise Wilson as Miss Watson
- Frances Conroy as Scrawny Shanty Woman
- Renee O'Connor as Julia Wilks
- Daniel Tamberelli as Ben Rodgers
- Garette Ratliff Henson as Billy Grangerford

== Production ==
The film was shot in Natchez, Mississippi.

Principal photography for The Adventures of Huck Finn took place from August 26 to October 23, 1992 in Natchez, Mississippi. The first day of filming was interrupted by the arrival of Hurricane Andrew which forced the shoot indoors at the Twin Oaks mansion. The Dunleith Historic Inn served as the "Grangerford" estate in the film. Additional filming took place at the Rosalie Mansion, Santon Hall, Under the Hill Saloon, and the Natchez Garden Pilgrimage Club. An onscreen kiss between Wood and Bundy was filmed but not included in the final film.

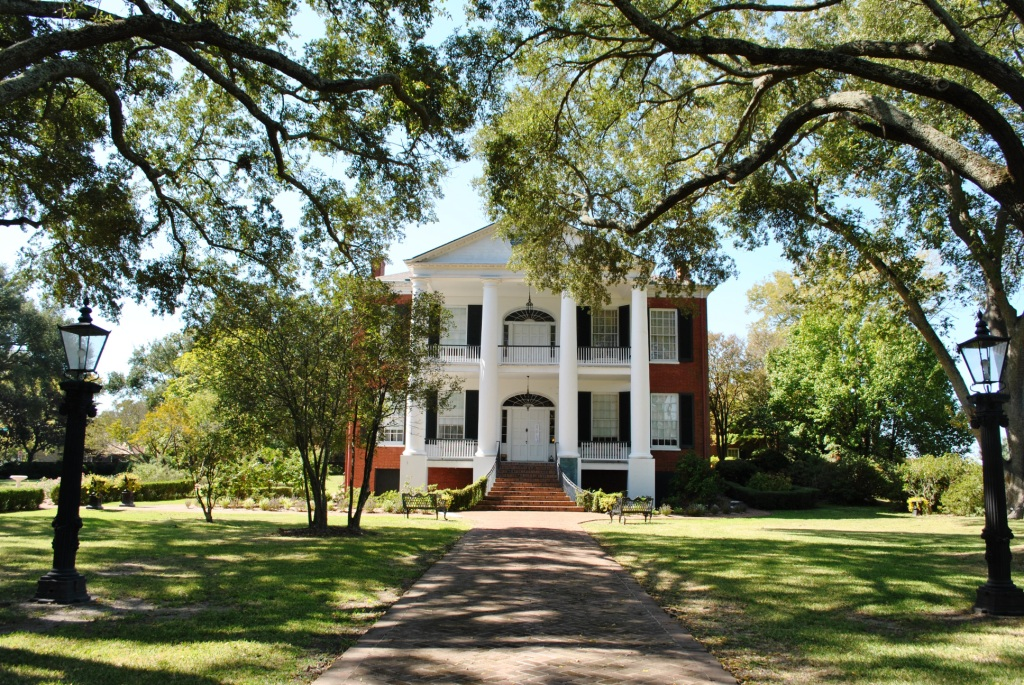
Rosalie Mansion, a mansion located in Natchez, Mississippi during the movie.

== Music ==
Bill Conti's score to The Adventures of Huck Finn was released in 1993 by Varèse Sarabande.

The Adventures of Huck Finn (Original Motion Picture Soundtrack)

Film score by Bill Conti
- Released: 1993
- Genre: Soundtrack
- Length: 31:05
- Label: Varèse Sarabande

The Adventures of Huck Finn (Original Motion Picture Soundtrack)
No.	Title	Length
1.	"Main Title"	4:43
2.	"Missy Finn Goes Shoppin'"	2:42
3.	"Next Of Kin"	2:01
4.	"Do The Right Thang"	2:48
5.	"Once A Slave"	3:26
6.	"We're Still Friends"	2:43
7.	"Billy Gets Killed"	2:19
8.	"The Barge"	2:43
9.	"Huck Springs Jim"	3:15
10.	"All's Well"	4:25
Total length:		31:05

== Reception ==
The Adventures of Huck Finn was a financial success, debuting at number two at the box office, and grossing over $24 million.

The film received generally positive reviews from critics, and currently holds a 75% "fresh" rating at review aggregate Rotten Tomatoes based on 16 reviews. Noted critic Roger Ebert gave the film 3 out of 4 stars, writing "The story of Huck and Jim has been told in six or seven earlier movies, and now comes The Adventures of Huck Finn, a graceful and entertaining version by a young director named Stephen Sommers, who doesn't dwell on the film's humane message, but doesn't avoid it, either."

== Home media ==
The film was released on VHS and LaserDisc on November 24, 1993. The DVD was released on January 15, 2002, On February 10, 2009 the film was released double feature with Tom and Huck (1995).

== See also ==
- List of films featuring slavery
