= Hank Bedford =

American writer and film director

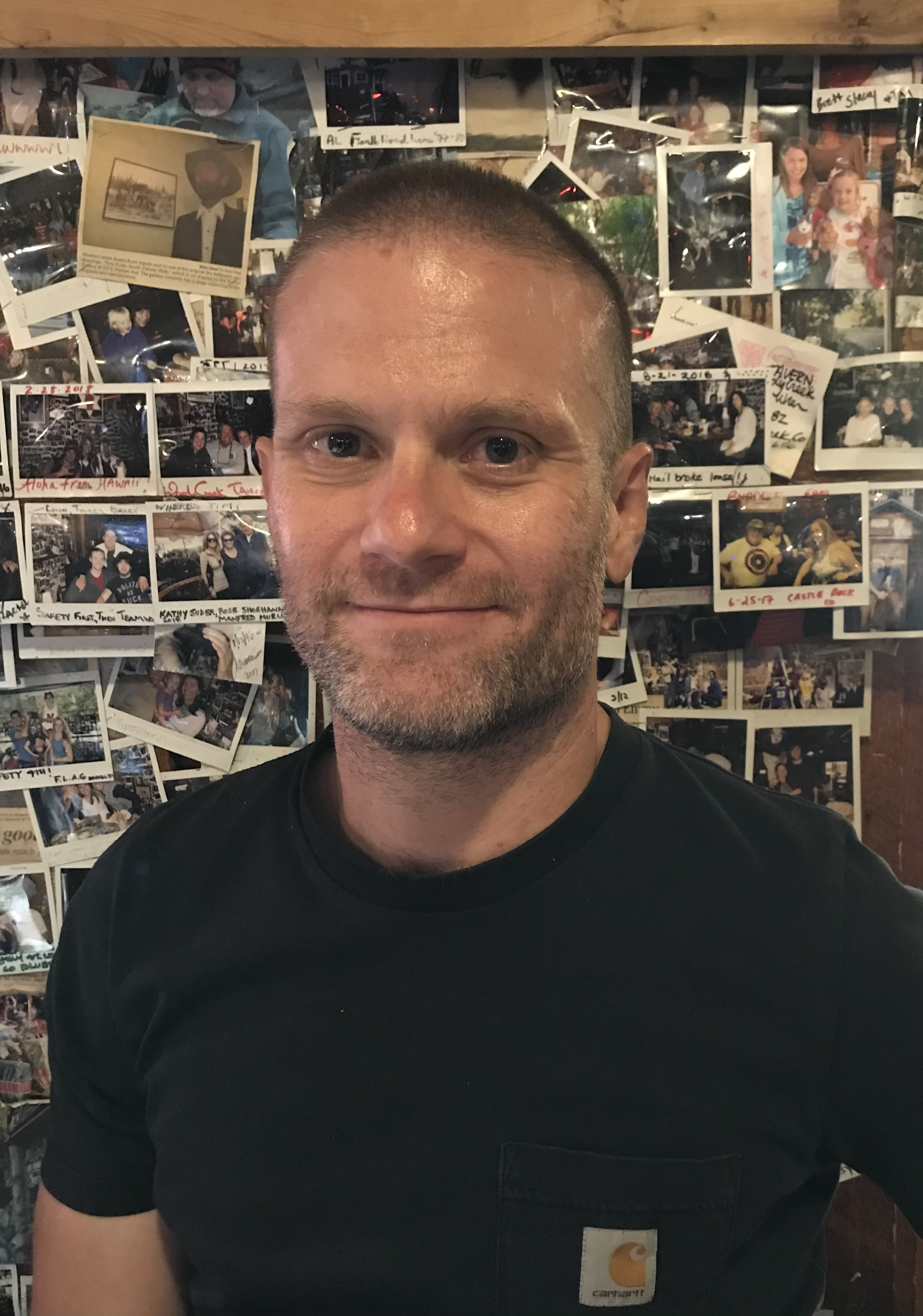
Hank Bedford, American writer and film director

Hank Bedford is an American writer and film director.

== Early life and education ==
Bedford graduated from Franklin High School in 1996 and from Middle Tennessee State University in 2001. While in college, he sold books door to door for the Southwestern Company. He fell in love with movies in 1982, after having seen E.T.

== Career ==
In 2006, he moved to Los Angeles to pursue a film career. Bedford quickly gained the reputation he needed to assist some of the most successful directors in Hollywood.

Early career positions included an internship with Scott Rudin Productions, on-set assistant to Scott Cooper, Tarsem Singh, and David O. Russell, In 2014, Bedford worked as an associate producer on Foxcatcher, directed by Bennett Miller.

He made his directorial debut in 2015, when his film, Dixieland, premiered at the Tribeca Film Festival. The film stars Riley Keough, Chris Zylka, Faith Hill, and Steve Earle, Spencer Lofranco, R.J. Mitte, and Brad Carter. Bennett Miller interviewed him for Vanity Fair about his decision to make the movie. The two reminisce about being on the set of Miller's Foxcatcher, how Bedford runs everywhere on set no matter how close he's going and his preference for wearing shorts no matter the weather.

The idea to make Dixieland began during his time in college at MTSU. Bedford described the plot in an interview with Indiewire, it's "about a kid who gets out of jail, meets a beautiful girl who is in trouble and decides to help her the only way he knows how.” The movie is cut with interviews with local Mississippians that provide the viewer with a gritty view of real life in the South. Bedford credits William Eggleston's style of photography as his inspiration for the movie's color aesthetic. HIs use of gritty, real scenes with natural, low light, amped up with saturated pops of color give the film's cinematography an Eggleston-esque feel.

Dixieland was also honored at the Deauville American Film Fest in 2015.

The movie was purchased by IFC Films in late 2015.

Bedford's 2024 film, Eugene the Marine, was co-written with Cesare Gagliardoni and stars Scott Glenn, Annette O’Toole, Jim Gaffigan, and Shioli Kutsuna. The film opened the 32nd Oldenburg International Film Festival in September 2025 with its world premiere.

On April 27th it was announced that Letterboxd would release the film as one of four unreleased gems.

Eugene the Marine was released for digital rental on Letterboxd Video Store on April, 29th 2026.

On August 17, 2026 it was announced that Cineverse acquired domestic rights for Eugene the Marine with plans for a theatrical release in select cities in the fall.
