= Taking Earth =

- Directed by: Grant Humphreys; Agung Bagus
- Written by: Grant Humphreys; Grant Knight; Michael Harrison
- Produced by: Grant Humphreys; Grant Knight; Michael Harrison; Agung Bagus; Galen Christy
- Starring: Ronan Quarmby; Brad Richards; Marco Torlage; Dick Sorensen; Barbara Harrison; Virgilio Da Sliva; Annabelle Van Heerden; Tyla Goodwin; Gill Koziel; Fabio Vasili; Ivan Torlage; Darren Tromp
- Cinematography: Michael Harrison; Grant Humphreys; Grant Knight
- Edited by: Grant Humphreys
- Music by: Josh Cruddas; Grant Humphreys
- Production company: Digital Forces
- Distributed by: High Octane Pictures (USA) - Sales Agent Licensed to multiple distributors worldwide
- Release dates: 3 March 2017 (Japan); 17 March 2017 (US)
- Running time: 96 minutes (Directors cut 127 Minutes)
- Country: South Africa
- Language: English
- Budget: $250,000

Taking Earth is a 2016 South African low-budget science fiction film directed by Grant Humphreys and Agung Bagus, written by Grant Humphreys, Grant Knight, and Michael Harrison.

== Plot ==
An unexplained attack happens when concealed aliens invade Earth to find one person out of 7 billion who can save the fate of the planet.

== Cast ==
- Marco Torlage as Cameron, an alien disguised as a human who has been hiding on Earth for the past 7 years
- Ronan Quarmby as David, Cameron's friend
- Brad Richards as Garabon/Graeme, an invading alien disguised as a human, tasked with finding Cameron
- Barbara Harrison as Ellen, Cameron's protector who is an alien disguised as a human
- Dick Sorenson as Devanera, Neran leader, Garabon's father, and Irehkull's uncle
- Annabelle Van Heerden as Sarah, David's girlfriend
- Tyla Goodwin as Shanna, a young lady who was rescued by Cameron and David

== Production and release ==
The film was produced in South Africa by Digital Forces, the 3MT (Three Man Team). It was released in Japan on 3 March 2017 and in the United States on 17 March 2017. It also came out on iTunes on 2 May 2017 and on Netflix on 31 July 2017. Screenmedia in the USA used YouTube (Popcornflix) as another distribution arm and the film has received over 5 Million views.

The film was sold worldwide by the High Octane Media - Sales agent, and distributed in multiple territories. The producers wrote Taking Earth with the intention of building a larger universe. There are currently 2 sequels planned.

== Reception ==
Filmtv gave the film, a 3.3/10 Letterboxd gave the film, a 2.8/5, Moria gave the film, a 2 1/2/5, Nerdly said "Taking Earth is a soft recommend", Sensecritique gave the film, a 2.7/10.
