= Screwed (2017 film) =

2017 Finnish romantic drama film

- Theatrical film poster
- Finnish: Pihalla
- Directed by: Nils-Erik Ekblom
- Written by: Nils-Erik Ekblom; Tom Norrgrann
- Produced by: Nils-Erik Ekblom; Marko S. Eronen; Tom Norrgrann
- Starring: Mikko Kauppila; Valtteri Lehtinen
- Cinematography: Nils-Erik Ekblom
- Edited by: Nils-Erik Ekblom; Tommi Hietaniemi; Osku Tuominen
- Music by: Karl Dumas; Tom Norrgrann; Santtu Ruuska
- Release dates: June 19, 2017 (Frameline); November 30, 2018 (Finland)
- Running time: 100 mins.
- Country: Finland
- Languages: English; Finnish

Screwed (Finnish: Pihalla) is a 2017 Finnish romantic drama independent film directed by Nils-Erik Ekblom, who co-wrote with Tom Norrgrann. The film stars Mikko Kauppila and Valtteri Lehtinen. It premiered at the Frameline Film Festival in 2017, before a limited theatrical release throughout the Finland in 2018.

== Synopsis ==
A Finnish drama film about two 17-year-olds, Miku and Elias, who find themselves, and each other, during a summer in the Finnish countryside and discover that love is not as easy as it seems.

== Cast ==
- Mikko Kauppila as Miku
- Valtteri Lehtinen as Elias
- Sanna Majuri as Minna
- Mirja Oksanen as Veera
- Juho Keskitalo as Sebu
- Sami Huhtala as Jaakko
- Amanda Virolainen as Sini
- Kaisa Saarakkala as Sanna
- Ossi Ågren as Koivu
- Marlene Dumas as Party Girl

== Reception ==
Manolo Palma of Letterboxd gave it 3/5 stars and commented: "Although his director had a good story to tell, his photography was constantly lost between what he wanted to capture and what he did not." Radek Flekal of CSFD.cz rated it 2/5 stars and opined: "What bothered me most about [the film] was the amateurish execution ('prehistoric' editing and poor camera work) and the overall weak story, which did not feature any memorable or powerful moments."
