= Eugene the Marine =

- Directed by: Hank Bedford
- Written by: Hank Bedford; Cesare Gagliardoni
- Produced by: Barbara Bedford; Hank Bedford; Henry Bedford; Cesare Gagliardoni; Patrice Innocenti; Anita Modak-Truran; Lisa Reneau; Stephen Vincent
- Starring: Scott Glenn
- Cinematography: Ksusha Genenfeld; Derek Howard
- Edited by: Brian Miele
- Music by: Angela Aki
- Production companies: Concourse Media; Graham Avenue Productions
- Distributed by: Cineverse (United States)
- Release date: September 2025 (Oldenburg); 2026 (United States)
- Country: United States
- Language: English

Eugene the Marine is a 2025 American thriller film written by Hank Bedford and Cesare Gagliardoni and directed by Bedford. It stars Scott Glenn as the titular character. In September 2025, the film premiered at the 32nd Oldenburg International Film Festival as its opening night film. It was released for digital rental on Letterboxd Video Store on April 29, 2026.

== Summary ==
A former marine living a regimented life is on the verge of being kicked out of home by his son, then finds himself simultaneously opening up to new friends and dealing with a masked serial killer murdering them one by one.

== Cast ==
- Scott Glenn as Gene Lee Grady
- Jim Gaffigan as Jackie
- Annette O'Toole as Frances
- Shioli Kutsuna as Parker
- Jeremy Bobb as Andrew
- Zach Zucker as Animal Money
- Yesly Dimate as Jenny
- Delaney Quinn as Becca
- Willie C. Carpenter as Phil
- Joe Ando-Hirsh as Danny
- Janira Reyes as Lex

== Production ==
In August 2022, it was announced that Nick Nolte was set to play Gene. In September that same year, it was announced that Barbara Hershey was cast to play Frances.

In October 2024, it was announced that Glenn replaced Nolte, and that Shioli Kutsuna, Annette O'Toole and Jim Gaffigan were added to the cast and that filming occurred.

== Release ==
It had its world premiere on September 10, 2025, as the opening night film of the Oldenburg International Film Festival.

On April 27 it was announced that Letterboxd would release Eugene the Marine as one of four unreleased gems and made available for a limited time via Letterboxd Video Store.

It was released for digital rental on Letterboxd Video Store on April 29, 2026.

On August 17, 2026 it was announced that Cineverse acquired domestic distribution for the film with plans to release it later this year.

== Reception ==
William Earl praised Scott Glenn’s performance and the film, writing that Glenn “kicks ass” and that the film includes “clever and shocking twists.”

Ben Nicholson reviewed the film with positive remarks and describes it as a "combination of psychological thriller, giallo mystery and hallmark movie.” He called the film “a huge amount of fun” and “a fabulously enjoyable ride.” His final verdict commends the film and the lead actor: "Scott Glenn is fantastic in this genre-bender that uses heartwarming comedy and bloody giallo to rage against the dying of the light."

Frank Scheck of The Hollywood Reporter gave the film a mixed review, praising Glenn's performance but not fully endorsing the film itself. He described the film as “audaciously original” and highlighted the look and feel of the film, writing “Shot in 16mm, (the film) utilizes a variety of vintage cinematic devices including split screens and old-fashioned wipes between scenes, giving the film a distinctly nostalgic, horror-film vibe. That's particularly true in the bonkers final act.”
