= Naked City: Justice with a Bullet =

- Written by: Malvin Wald (characters); Jeff Freilich
- Directed by: Jeff Freilich
- Starring: Scott Glenn; Courtney B. Vance; Giancarlo Esposito; Kathryn Erbe; Robin Tunney
- Music by: Ashley Irwin; Jon Tomasello
- Country of origin: United States
- Original language: English

Production
- Producer: Jeff Freilich
- Cinematography: Miroslaw Baszek
- Editor: David Hicks
- Running time: 107 minutes

Original release
- Network: Showtime Networks
- Release: October 4, 1998

Naked City: Justice with a Bullet is a 1998 American crime drama television film about two detectives who have to protect two girls who have been robbed of all their money and luggage.

Airing on Showtime, the movie is loosely based on the 1948 film The Naked City, with Scott Glenn and Courtney B. Vance in the roles originated by Barry Fitzgerald and Don Taylor. A sequel, titled Naked City: A Killer Christmas aired a few months later.

Kim Poirier has a cameo appearance in the film.

== Cast ==
- Scott Glenn as Sergeant Daniel Muldoon
- Courtney B. Vance as Officer James Halloran
- Giancarlo Esposito as Chaz Villanueva
- Eli Wallach as Deluca
- Kathryn Erbe as Sarah Tubbs
- Robin Tunney as Merri Coffman
- Barbara Williams as Eva
