= Love and Action in Chicago =

Love And Action In Chicago
- Theatrical poster
- Directed by: Dwayne Johnson-Cochran
- Written by: Dwayne Johnson-Cochran
- Produced by: David Forrest; Beau Rogers; Betsey Chasse; Danny Gold
- Starring: Courtney B. Vance; Regina King; Jason Alexander; Kathleen Turner; Ed Asner
- Cinematography: Phil Parmet
- Edited by: J. Kathleen Gibson
- Music by: Russ Landau
- Distributed by: MTI Home Video
- Release date: May 1, 1999
- Running time: 95 minutes
- Country: United States
- Language: English

Love And Action In Chicago is a 1999 American action romantic comedy starring Courtney B. Vance, Regina King and Kathleen Turner. The film, written and directed by Dwayne Johnson-Cochran, in his directorial debut, focuses on a celibate hired assassin finding love with a quirky accountant in Chicago.

== Cast ==
- Courtney B. Vance as Eddie Jones
- Regina King as Lois Newton
- Kathleen Turner as Middleman
- Jason Alexander as Frank Bonner
- Edward Asner as Taylor
- Robert Breuler as Oli
- Michael Gilio as Martin
- Kamala Lopez as Anna

== Reception ==
=== Critical reception ===
Variety's Todd McCarthy described the film as a "spirited but unlikely romantic romp" that treats serious issues with discordant frivolity. While praising the film's imaginative genre play, sprightly writing, and performances, he notes that it struggles to effectively address moral complexities, leading to a disjunction between its comic style and serious undertones. He suggests that the film's virtues may not lead to major theatrical success but could find a promising audience on cable and video platforms.
