= Naked City: A Killer Christmas =

- Based on: The Naked City by Albert Maltz & Malvin Wald
- Written by: Jeff Freilich; Christopher Trumbo
- Directed by: Peter Bogdanovich
- Starring: Scott Glenn; Courtney B. Vance; Laura Leighton; Barbara Williams; Nigel Bennett; Lisa Vidal; Al Waxman
- Theme music composer: Hummie Mann
- Country of origin: United States
- Original language: English

Production
- Producer: Jeff Freilich
- Cinematography: James Gardner
- Editor: David Baxter
- Running time: 92 minutes
- Production company: Paramount Television

Original release
- Network: Showtime
- Release: December 13, 1998

Naked City: A Killer Christmas is a 1998 American film directed by Peter Bogdanovich. It was the second of two films for Showtime based on the 1948 movie The Naked City, the first being Naked City: Justice with a Bullet.

== Cast ==
- Scott Glenn as Sergeant Daniel Muldoon
- Courtney B. Vance as Officer James Halloran
- Laura Leighton as Gerry Millar
- Barbara Williams as Eva
- Nigel Bennett as Joseph Soloff
- Lisa Vidal as Lori Halloran
- Al Waxman as Burt
- Boyd Banks as Jack
