= SAG-AFTRA Foundation =

- Formerly: Screen Actors Guild Foundation (1985-2015)
- Type: Foundation
- Industry: Organization
- Predecessor: Screen Actors Guild Foundation
- Founded: 1985 (as Screen Actors Guild Foundation); 2012 (as SAG-AFTRA Foundation)
- Headquarters: United States
- Products: SAG-AFTRA
- Revenue: 5,710,753 United States dollar (2016)
- Total assets: 44,486,688 United States dollar (2022)
- Website: sagaftra.foundation

The SAG-AFTRA Foundation (formerly the Screen Actors Guild Foundation) is an American organization that provides assistance and educational programming to the professionals of SAG-AFTRA. It also provides children's literacy programs to the public. Founded in 1985, it relies solely on support from grants, corporate sponsorships and individuals to maintain its programs.

The foundation contributes to the advancement of literacy through Storyline Online presenting digital videos featuring professional actors reading children's books. Supplemental activities for each book are developed by an early literacy specialist. Together, the videos and related curriculum strengthen comprehension, verbal and written skills of English. Available twenty-four hours a day, seven days a week, free of charge.

Actor Courtney B. Vance is the current president of the SAG-AFTRA Foundation.
