= Rosalie Mansion =

- U.S. National Register of Historic Places
- U.S. National Historic Landmark
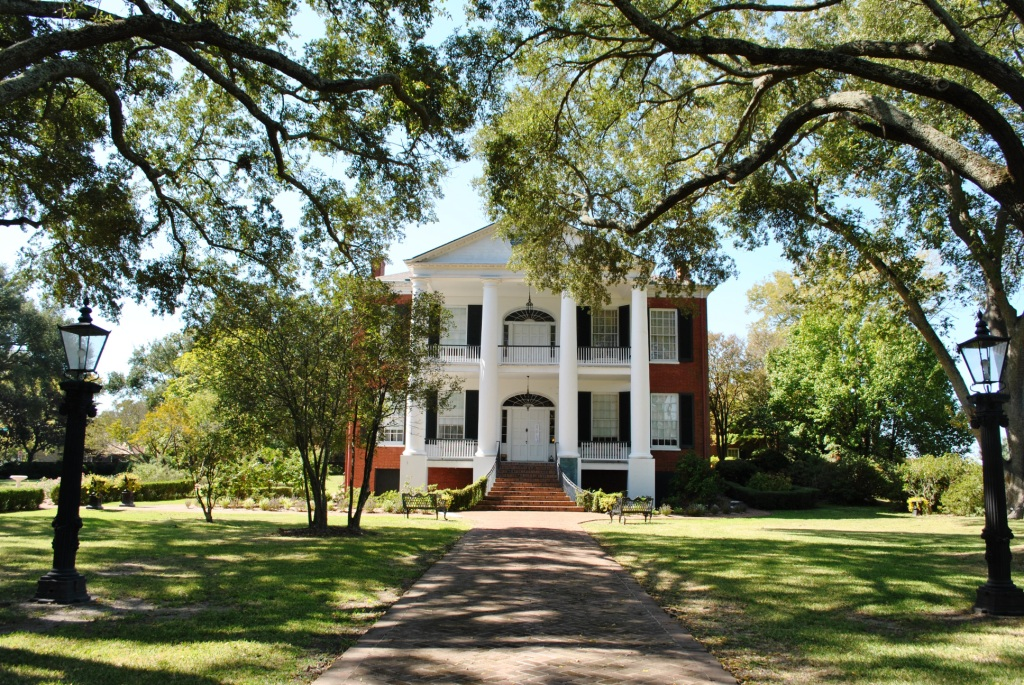
- Front view

- Location within Mississippi Location within the United States
- Location: 100 Orleans Street, Natchez, Mississippi
- Coordinates: 31°33′32.12″N 91°24′30.33″W
- Built: 1822
- Architect: J.S. Griffin
- Architectural style: Greek Revival
- NRHP reference No.: 77000781

Significant dates
- Added to NRHP: August 16, 1977
- Designated NHL: January 19, 1989

Rosalie Mansion is a historic pre-Civil War mansion and historic house museum in Natchez, Mississippi. Built in 1823, it was a major influence on Antebellum architecture in the greater region, inspiring many of Natchez's grand Greek Revival mansions. During the American Civil War, it served as U.S. Army headquarters for the Natchez area from July 1863 on. It was designated a National Historic Landmark in 1989.

== Description ==
Rosalie is located southwest of Natchez's downtown, overlooking the Mississippi River at the intersection of Orleans and South Broadway Streets. It is a cubical three-story brick building with a truncated hip roof encircled by a low balustrade. Its front facade has a monumental four-column Tuscan portico with entablature and a gabled pediment with a semi-oval window at its center. Broad entrances in the center bay provide access to the house on the ground floor and to a balcony on the second floor; both have double-leaf doors, sidelight windows, and semi-oval transom windows. A five-column portico extends across the center of the rear elevation, although a flat roof without an entablature covers it.

== History ==
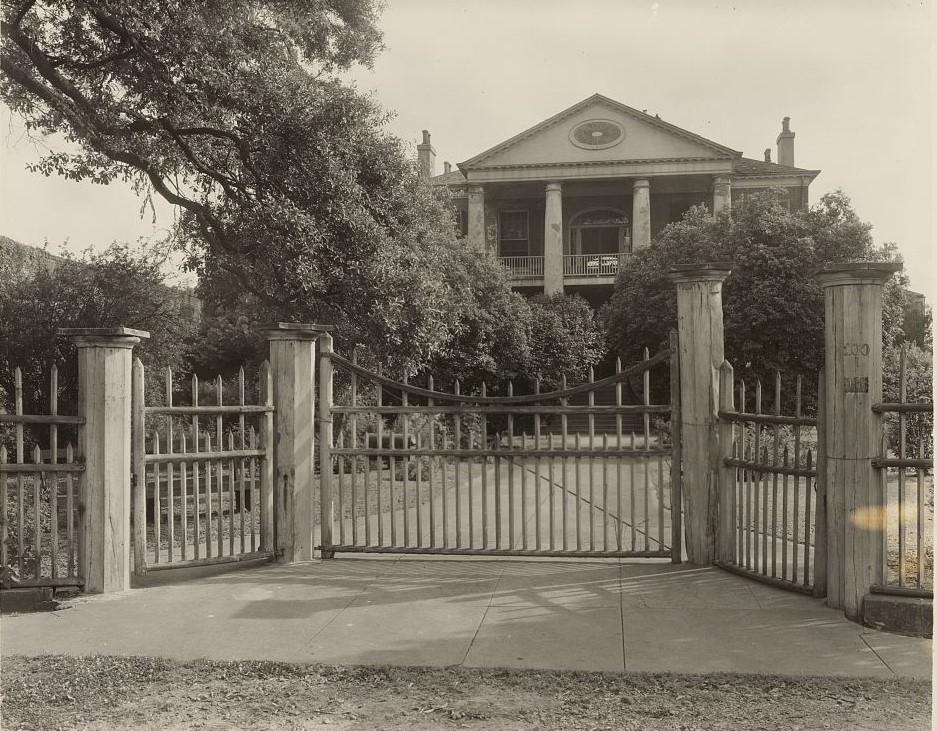
Rosalie, by Frances Benjamin Johnston, 1938

Rosalie Mansion was built by enslaved people for Peter Little, a wealthy cotton broker, in 1823 on the bluff overlooking the Mississippi River. It is on a portion of the site of the 1729 Natchez revolt at Fort Rosalie.

On July 13, 1863, a week after the Siege of Vicksburg, U.S. Maj. Gen. Ulysses S. Grant took possession of the mansion to use as a headquarters. On August 26, 1863, General Walter Q. Gresham took command of U.S. troops at Natchez. His headquarters remained at Rosalie. Gresham had much of the owner's furnishings stored in the attic and put under guard to prevent theft or destruction. U.S. Army tents covered much of the property surrounding the mansion. U.S. soldiers were positioned in the widow's walk atop the mansion.

== Historic house museum ==
The Mississippi State Society Daughters of the American Revolution has owned, operated, and maintained Rosalie Mansion as a historic house museum for more than seventy years.

It was declared a National Historic Landmark in 1989.

== Gallery ==
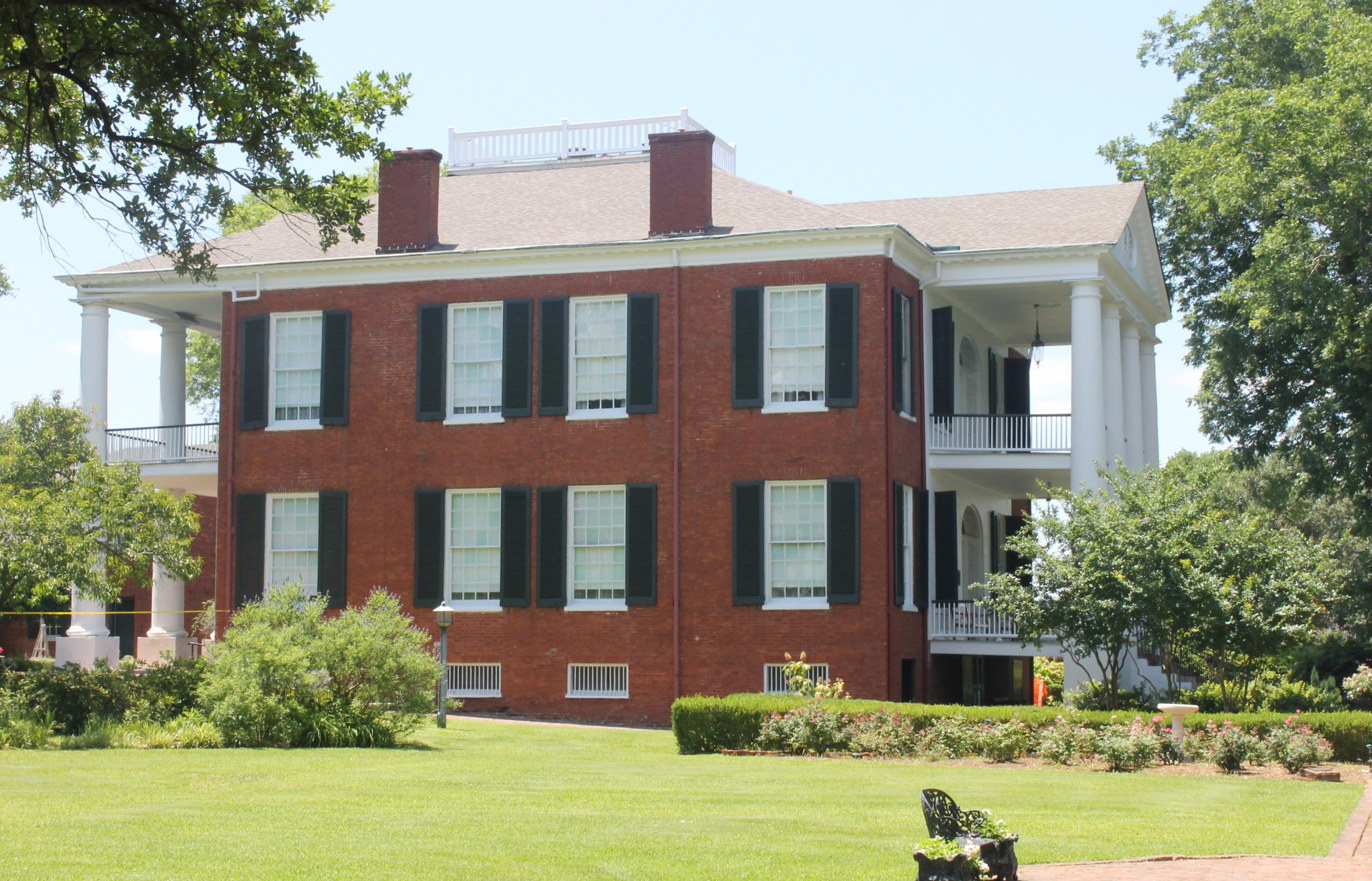
Side view

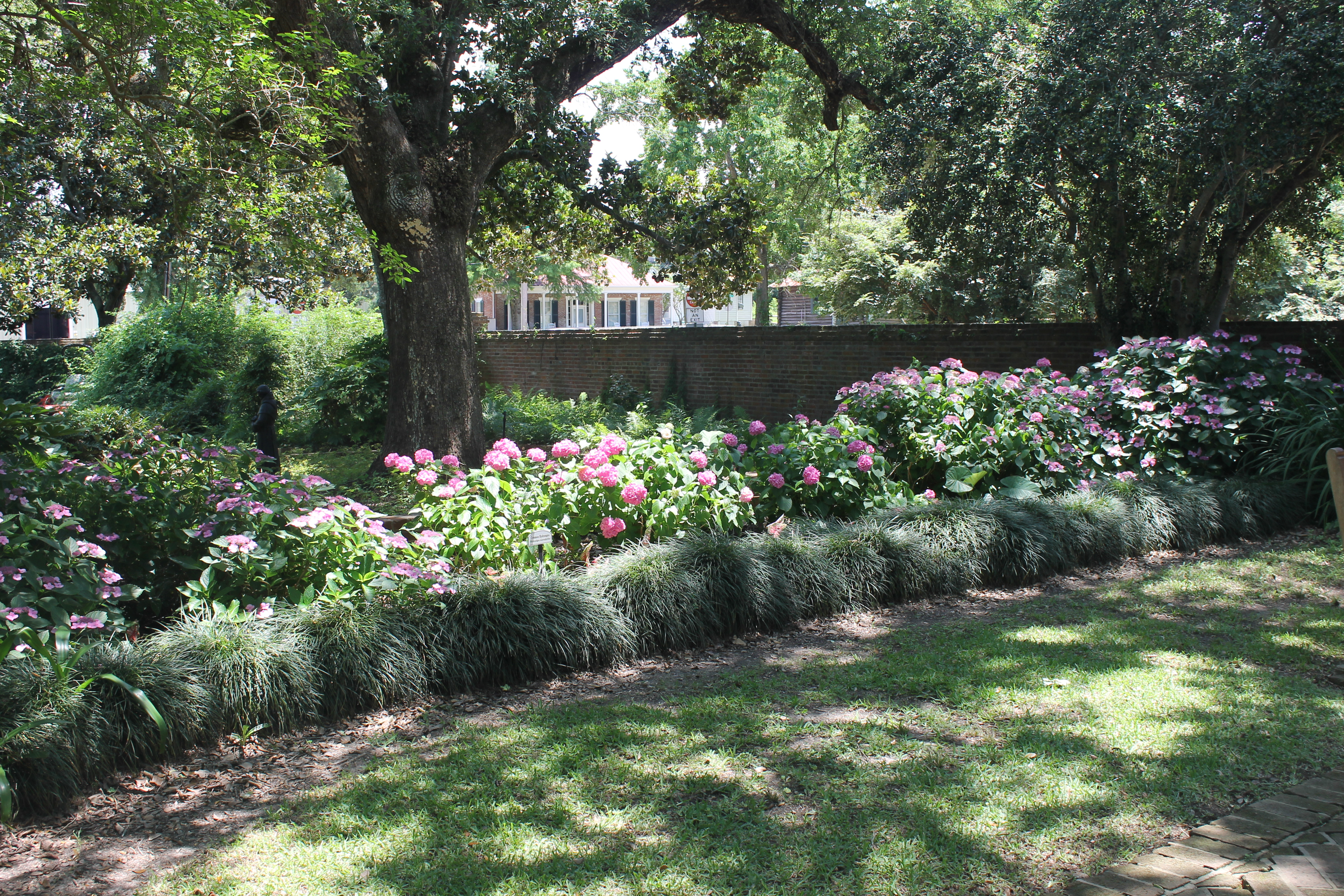
Flower garden

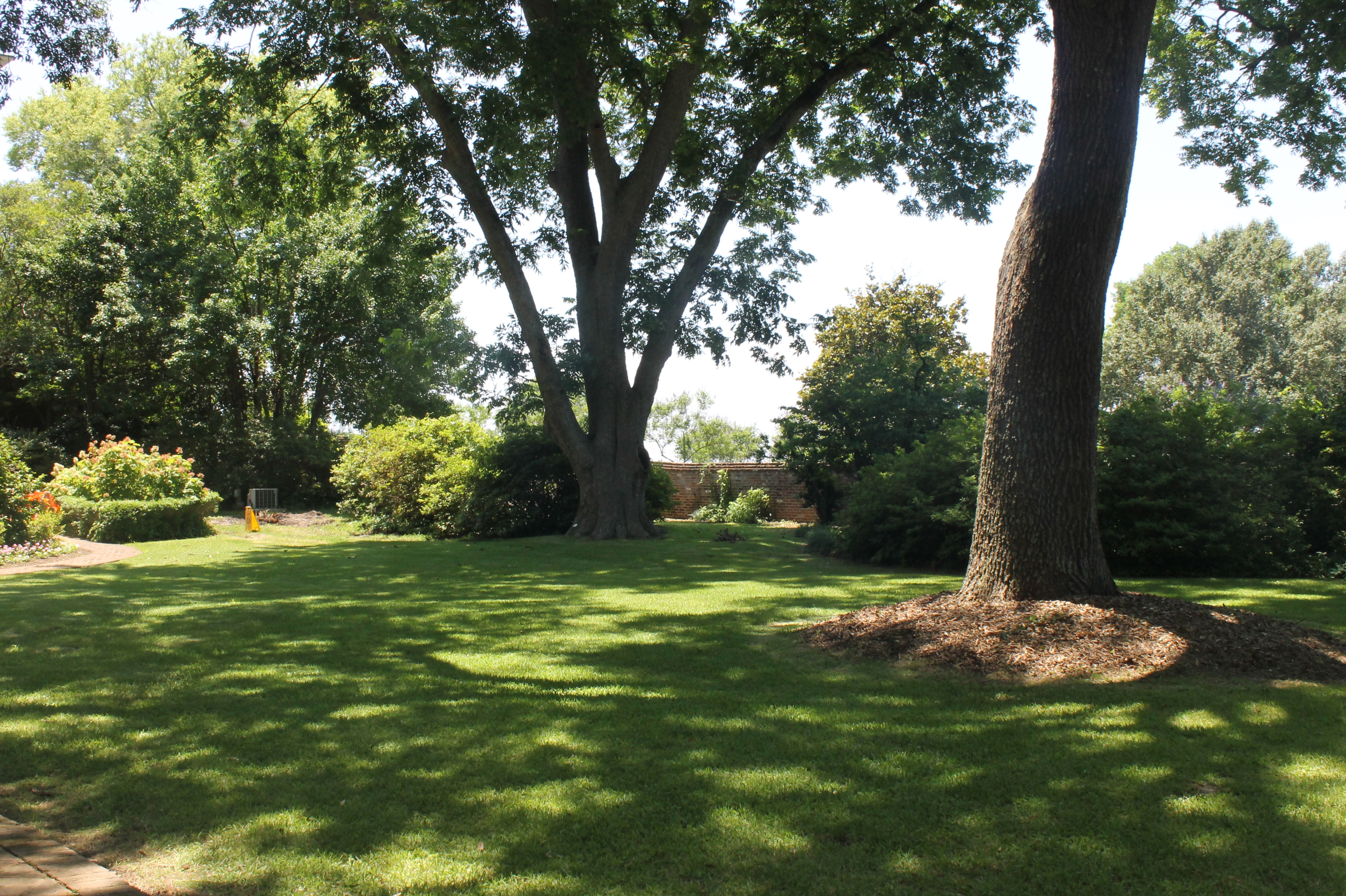
Greenery abounds in wet months

== See also ==
- List of National Historic Landmarks in Mississippi
- National Register of Historic Places listings in Adams County, Mississippi
