= Courtney B. Vance =

American actor (born 1960)

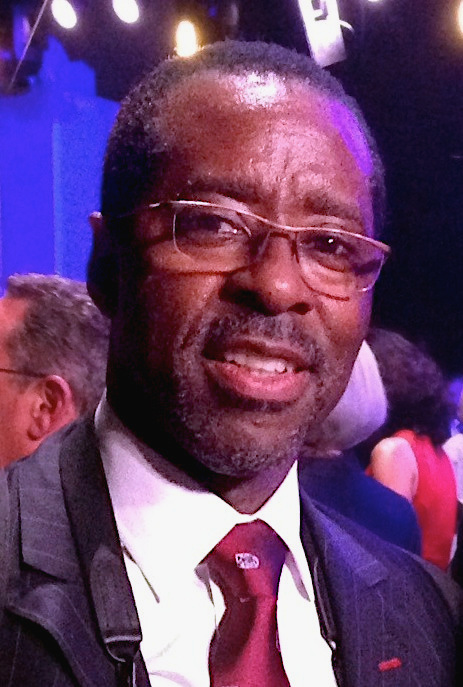
- Vance in 2013
- Born: Courtney Bernard Vance; March 12, 1960 (age 66); Detroit, Michigan, U.S.
- Education: Harvard University (BA); Yale University (MFA)
- Occupation: Actor
- Years active: 1983–present
- Board member of: Harvard Board of Overseers
- Spouse: Angela Bassett (m. 1997)
- Children: 2

Courtney Bernard Vance (born March 12, 1960) is an American actor. He started his career on stage before moving to film and television. Vance has received various accolades, including a Tony Award and two Primetime Emmy Awards, as well as nominations for a Grammy Award, Golden Globe Award, and Screen Actors Guild Award.

Having trained at the Yale School of Drama, he soon made his Broadway debut in the original production of August Wilson's Fences (1985), earning his first Tony Award nomination. He continued acting in theatre in John Guare's Six Degrees of Separation (1990) and Nora Ephron's Lucky Guy (2013), the latter of which earned him a Tony Award for Best Featured Actor in a Play. He is known for his roles in the films Hamburger Hill (1987), The Hunt for Red October (1990), The Tuskegee Airmen (1995), The Preacher's Wife (1996), Cookie's Fortune (1999), and Isle of Dogs (2018).

From 2001 to 2006, he portrayed Assistant District Attorney Ron Carver in the NBC series Law & Order: Criminal Intent. He earned Primetime Emmy Awards for Outstanding Lead Actor in a Limited Series or Movie portraying Johnnie Cochran in the FX limited series The People v. O. J. Simpson: American Crime Story (2016), and for Outstanding Guest Actor in a Drama Series playing George Freeman in the HBO series Lovecraft Country (2020). He played Sir Lord Keenan Kester Cofield in The Immortal Life of Henrietta Lacks (2017) and C. L. Franklin in Genius: Aretha (2020).

He has been married to actress Angela Bassett since 1997. He is on the board of directors of The Actors Center in New York City, and is an active supporter of Boys & Girls Clubs of America. In 2019, he was appointed president of the Screen Actors Guild Foundation.

== Early life and education ==
Vance was born in Detroit, Michigan, the son of Leslie Anita (née Daniels), a librarian, and Conroy Vance, a grocery store manager and benefits administrator. He attended Detroit Country Day School and later graduated from Harvard University with a Bachelor of Arts degree in history in 1982. While at Harvard, he was already working as an actor at the Boston Shakespeare Company. He subsequently earned a Master of Fine Arts degree at Yale School of Drama, where he met fellow student and future wife Angela Bassett.

== Career ==
=== 1985–1999: Broadway debut and early roles ===
In 1985, Vance started his acting career on the stage as Cory in the Yale Repertory Theatre production of August Wilson's Pulitzer Prize-winning and Tony Award for Best Play-winning play Fences. From 1987 to 1988, Vance continued the role on Broadway opposite James Earl Jones where he won a Clarence Derwent Award and the Theatre World Award for his performance. He was also nominated for his first Tony Award for Best Featured Actor in a Play for his role. Vance's film debut was in 1987 American war film, Hamburger Hill about the 1969 assault during the Vietnam War. During this time he had small roles in the CBS television film First Affair (1983), and the ABC drama Thirtysomething (1989), and Law & Order (1990). Vance played Thami Mbikwarna in the Athol Fugard play My Children! My Africa! at the New York Theatre Workshop from 1989 to 1990. In 1991, Vance returned to Broadway playing Paul in John Guare's Six Degrees of Separation. Vance played Paul, replacing James McDaniel who originated the role in the 1990 Off-Broadway production. Vance acted alongside John Cunningham and Stockard Channing. He was nominated for the Tony Award for Best Actor in a Play for his performance at the 45th Tony Awards.

Throughout the 1990s, Vance continued acting in a variety of feature films such as The Hunt for Red October (1990), and The Adventures of Huck Finn (1993). In 1995, Vance played Black Panther Bobby Seale in the Melvin and Mario Van Peebles docudrama Panther. That same year, he also appeared in The Last Supper, Dangerous Minds, and the HBO film The Tuskegee Airmen. He also worked with acclaimed directors such as Penny Marshall in The Preacher's Wife (1996), Robert Altman in Cookie's Fortune (1999), and Clint Eastwood in Space Cowboys (2000). During the 1990s, Vance guest-starred in numerous television shows including Law & Order, Picket Fences, and Thirtysomething. In 1998 he acted in the Showtime television film Blind Faith he played John Williams. Vance earned critical acclaim with Janet Maslin of The New York Times describing his performance as "first rate". He went on to receive a nomination for the Independent Spirit Award for Best Male Lead. He also starred in made-for-television films such as William Friedkin's 12 Angry Men (1997), in which he played the Foreman and acted alongside Ossie Davis, George C. Scott, Jack Lemmon, Hume Cronyn, and James Gandolfini. In 1999, Vance also starred in and co-produced the romantic comedy Love and Action in Chicago.

=== 2000–2015: Television roles and return to Broadway ===
From 2001 to 2006, Vance starred in Law & Order: Criminal Intent, in which he played A.D.A. Ron Carver. He was nominated for the NAACP Image Award for Outstanding Actor in a Drama Series for his performance. In 2008 and 2009, he guest-starred in the final season of ER alongside his wife Angela Bassett. He was also in Hurricane Season. On December 2, 2008, TV Guide reported that Vance had been cast as the Los Angeles bureau chief of the FBI in the ABC pilot FlashForward, based on a Robert J. Sawyer novel and slated to be a possible "companion show" to Lost. In 2011, he starred in the American horror film Final Destination 5. Vance was tapped for the lead in the German-American apocalypse thriller The Divide. He appeared in the Disney Channel Original Movie Let It Shine, where he played the pastor Jacob Debarge, the main character's father, and co-starred with Tyler James Williams, Trevor Jackson, Coco Jones, Brandon Mychal Smith, and Dawnn Lewis. It was the third time Vance portrayed a pastor in a motion picture, after The Preacher's Wife and Joyful Noise). Vance has provided the voiceover for the National Football League's "You Want the NFL, Go to the NFL" television spots.

He appeared as Chief Tommy Delk on the TNT series, The Closer, from 2010 to 2011 (Season 6–7). Vance also played the role of Attorney Benjamin Brooks on four episodes of ABC's Revenge. Vance returned to Broadway playing Hap Hairston in the Nora Ephron play Lucky Guy (2013) acting alongside Tom Hanks. David Rooney of The Hollywood Reporter praised Vance writing, "[He] is terrific as the whip-smart black editor who, even with the sharpest of professional skills, has had to stay on his toes to keep ahead in a white man’s game." He won the Tony Award for Best Featured Actor in a Play for his performance at the 67th Tony Awards. In 2015, he portrayed Miles Dyson in Terminator Genisys opposite Arnold Schwarzenegger and Emilia Clarke.

=== 2016–present: Career expansion ===
In 2016, he took on the role of famed civil rights lawyer Johnnie Cochran in FX's American Crime Story, which tells the story of the O. J. Simpson murder case. The series premiered on February 2, 2016, and his performance was critically acclaimed, winning Vance numerous accolades including the Primetime Emmy Award for Outstanding Lead Actor in a Limited or Anthology Series or Movie, and the Critics' Choice Television Award for Best Actor in a Movie/Miniseries. He was nominated for the Golden Globe Award for Best Actor – Miniseries or Television Film and the Screen Actors Guild Award for Outstanding Actor in a Miniseries or Television Movie. In 2017, he starred in the HBO television film The Immortal Life of Henrietta Lacks, where he played Sir Lord Keenan Kester Cofield opposite Oprah Winfrey's Deborah Lacks. In 2018, Vance narrated Wes Anderson's stop motion animated comedy Isle of Dogs. The same year, he appeared as Neil Beeby in the Peter Hedges film Ben Is Back, opposite Julia Roberts and Lucas Hedges.

In 2019, Vance was appointed President of the SAG-AFTRA Foundation. In 2020, Vance was seen in HBO's drama series Lovecraft Country for which he won a Primetime Emmy Award for Outstanding Guest Actor in a Drama Series. He was cast opposite Niecy Nash in Prentice Penny's feature film directorial debut, the Netflix original movie Uncorked, released in 2020. In 2021, he appeared in National Geographic's Genius: Aretha as C. L. Franklin. In 2023, Vance was cast in Disney's live-action reimagining of Lilo & Stitch as Cobra Bubbles.

In November 2024, it was announced that Vance would take over the role of Zeus in the second season of Percy Jackson and the Olympians following the 2023 death of Lance Reddick. In a statement, Vance expressed his excitement to join the cast and said he would be giving Reddick "a heavenly hug."

He was elected to a six-year term on the Harvard Board of Overseers in 2025.

== Personal life ==
=== Marriage and family ===
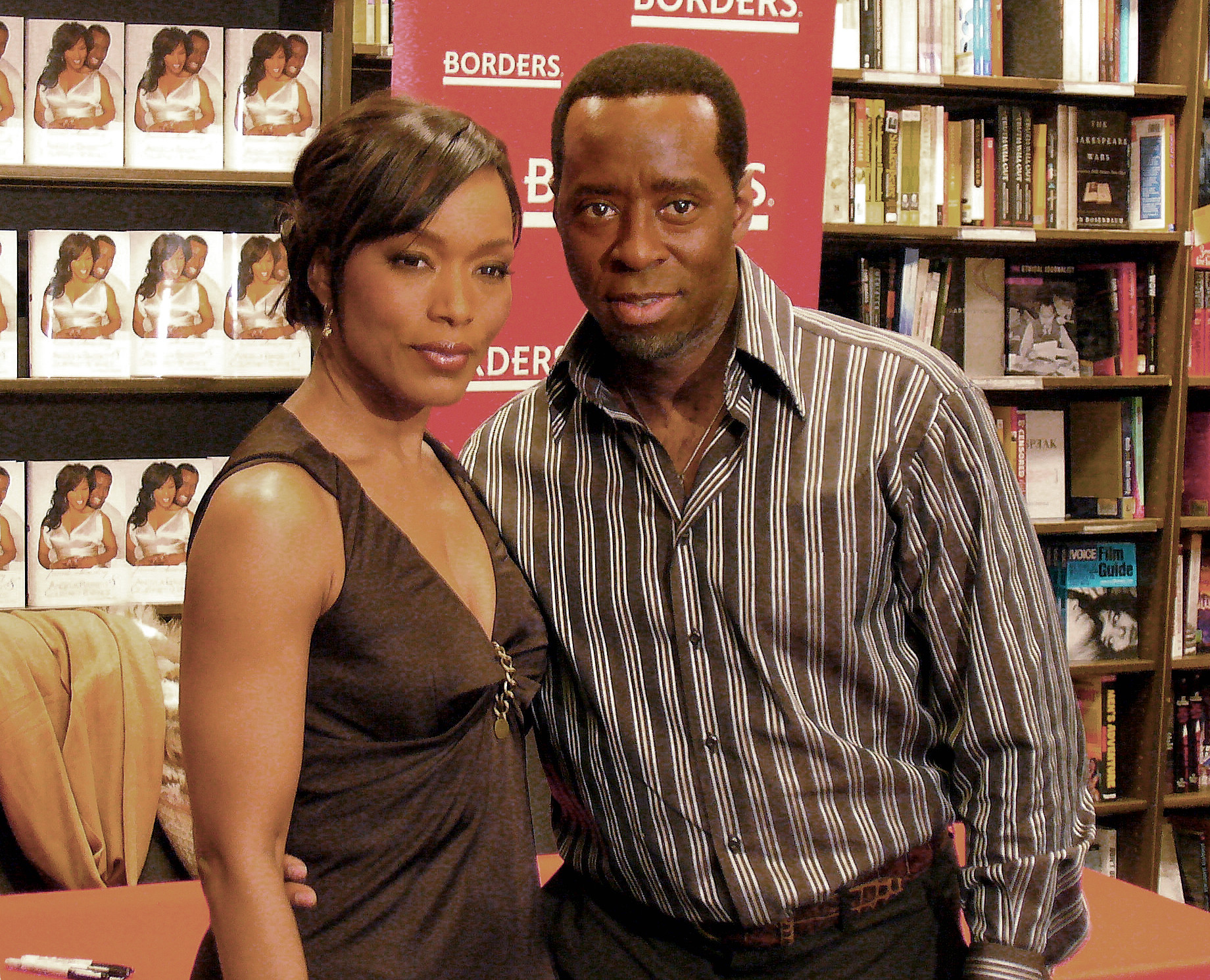
Vance with Angela Bassett in 2007

Vance first met Angela Bassett in 1980, and the pair have been married since 1997. Together, they have twins, a son and a daughter, born in 2006 via surrogacy. He and Bassett have authored a book, Friends: A Love Story, with Hilary Beard. The two also participate in the annual Christmas celebration, Candlelight Processional, at Epcot. The family lives in Los Angeles. On the PBS program Finding Your Roots, Vance discovered that his father was born out of wedlock to 17-year-old Victoria Ardella Vance. In October 2024, he voiced a commercial for Kamala Harris about Detroit.

=== Interests ===
Vance is on the Board of Directors for The Actors Center in New York City, and is an active supporter of Boys & Girls Clubs of America. He is an alumnus of the Detroit Boys & Girls Club, and was recently inducted into the Alumni Hall of Fame for Boys & Girls Clubs of America.

== Acting credits ==
=== Theatre ===
Year	Title	Role	Venue
1985	Fences	Cory	Yale Repertory Theatre
1987–88	Fences	Cory	46th Street Theatre, Broadway
1989–90	My Children! My Africa!	Thami Mbikwarna	New York Theatre Workshop
1990–92	Six Degrees of Separation	Paul	Vivian Beaumont Theatre, Broadway
2013	Lucky Guy	Hap Hairston	Broadhurst Theatre, Broadway

=== Film ===
Year	Title	Role	Notes
1987	Hamburger Hill	Spc. Abraham 'Doc' Johnson	
1990	The Hunt for Red October	Sonar Technician (Petty Officer 2nd Class) Jones	
1993	The Adventures of Huck Finn	Jim	
1993	Beyond the Law	Conroy Price	
1994	Holy Matrimony	Cooper	
1995	Panther	Bobby Seale	
1995	Dangerous Minds	George Grandey	
1995	The Tuskegee Airmen	2nd Lt. Glenn	
1995	The Last Supper	Luke	
1996	The Preacher's Wife	Reverend Henry Biggs	
1998	Blind Faith	John Williams	
1998	Ambushed	Jerry Robinson	
1999	Cookie's Fortune	Otis Tucker	
1999	Love and Action in Chicago	Eddie Jones	Also co-producer
2000	Space Cowboys	Roger Hines	
2002	D-Tox	Reverend Jones	Also known as Eye See You
2008	Nothing but the Truth	Agent O'Hara	
2009	Hurricane Season	Mr. Randolph	
2010	Extraordinary Measures	Marcus Temple	
2011	The Divide	Delvin	
2011	Final Destination 5	Agent Jim Block	
2012	Joyful Noise	Pastor Dale	
2015	Terminator Genisys	Miles Dyson	
2016	Office Christmas Party	Walter Davis	
2017	The Mummy	Army Colonel Greenway	
2018	Isle of Dogs	Narrator (voice)	
2018	Ben Is Back	Neal Burns	
2020	The Photograph	Louis Morton	
2020	Uncorked	Louis	
2020	Project Power	Captain Crane	
2023	Heist 88	Jeremy Horne	Also executive producer
2025	Lilo & Stitch	Cobra Bubbles	

=== Television ===
Year	Title	Role	Notes
1983	First Affair	Male student	Television film
1989	Thirtysomething	Curtis	Episode: "Trust Me"
1990	Law & Order	Mayor's Assistant	Episode: "By Hooker, by Crook"; Uncredited
1991	The Emperor's New Clothes	Scribe (voice)	Television film
1992	In the Line of Duty: Street War	Justice Butler	Television film
1993	Percy & Thunder	Thunder	Television film
1994	Race to Freedom: The Underground Railroad	Thomas	Television film
1995	Law & Order	Benjamin 'Bud' Greer	Episode: "Rage"
1995	The Piano Lesson	Lymon	Television film
1995	Picket Fences	Warren Grier	2 episodes
1995	The Tuskegee Airmen	Lt. Glenn	Television film
1995	The Affair	Travis Holloway	Television film
1996	The Boys Next Door	Lucien P. Singer	Television film
1997	12 Angry Men	Foreman	Television film
1998	Any Day Now	Mr. James Jackson	Episode: "Unfinished Symphony"
1998	Naked City: Justice with a Bullet	Officer James Halloran	Television film
1998	The Wild Thornberrys	Makai (voice)	Episode: "Naimina Enkiyio"
1998	Naked City: A Killer Christmas	Officer James Halloran	Television film
2000	Boston Public	Walter Harrelson	2 episodes
2001–06	Law & Order: Criminal Intent	A.D.A. Ron Carver	111 episodes
2002	American Experience	Dr. Vivien Thomas (voice)	Episode: "Partners of the Heart"
2002	Whitewash: The Clarence Brandley Story	Clarence Brandley	Television film
2004	American Experience	Narrator (voice)	Episode: "The Fight"
2007	Nova	Narrator (voice)	Episode: "Forgotten Genius"
2007	State of Mind	William Banks	3 episodes
2008–09	ER	Russell Banfield	8 episodes
2009	The Spectacular Spider-Man	Roderick Kingsley (voice)	Episode: "Accomplices"
2009–10	FlashForward	Stanford Wedeck	22 episodes
2010–11	The Closer	Chief Tommy Delk	3 episodes
2012	Revenge	Benjamin Brooks	4 episodes
2012	Let It Shine	Pastor Jacob DeBarge	Television film
2013	Graceland	Sam Campbell	Episode: "Pilot"
2014–15	State of Affairs	Marshall Payton	7 episodes
2014	Masters of Sex	Dr. Charles Hendricks	3 episodes
2015	Scandal	Clarence Parker	Episode: "The Lawn Chair"
2016	The People v. O. J. Simpson: American Crime Story	Johnnie Cochran	10 episodes
2017	The Immortal Life of Henrietta Lacks	Sir Lord Keenan Kester Cofield	Television film
2020	Lovecraft Country	George Freeman	3 episodes
2021	Genius: Aretha	C. L. Franklin	8 episodes
2022–23	61st Street	Franklin Roberts	16 episodes
2023	The Proud Family: Louder and Prouder	Merlin Kelly (voice)	Episode: "The Soul Vibrations"
2024	Grotesquerie	Marshall Tryon	9 episodes
2025	Percy Jackson and the Olympians	Zeus	Episode: "The Fleece Works Its Magic Too Well" (Note: replacing Lance Reddick as of Season 2)

== Awards and nominations ==
Year	Award	Category	Nominated work	Result
1987	Clarence Derwent Award	Most Promising Male Performer	Fences	Won
1987	Theatre World Award		Fences	Won
1987	Tony Award	Best Featured Actor in a Play	Fences	Nominated
1991	Tony Award	Best Actor in a Play	Six Degrees of Separation	Nominated
1998	Independent Spirit Award	Best Male Lead	Blind Faith	Nominated
2013	Tony Award	Best Featured Actor in a Play	Lucky Guy	Won
2016	Primetime Emmy Award	Outstanding Lead Actor in a Limited Series or a Movie	The People v. O.J. Simpson	Won
2016	Golden Globe Award	Best Actor - Miniseries or Television Movie	The People v. O.J. Simpson	Nominated
2016	Screen Actors Guild Award	Outstanding Actor in a Miniseries or Television Movie	The People v. O.J. Simpson	Nominated
2016	Critics' Choice Television Awards	Best Actor in a Movie or Limited Series	The People v. O.J. Simpson	Won
2016	Television Critics Association Award	Individual Achievement in Drama	The People v. O.J. Simpson	Nominated
2016	Satellite Award	Best Actor - Miniseries or Television Film	The People v. O.J. Simpson	Nominated
2016	NAACP Image Award	Outstanding Actor in a Television Movie/Miniseries/Special	The People v. O.J. Simpson	Won
2016	BET Awards	BET Award for Best Actor on Television	The People v. O.J. Simpson	Nominated
2019	Grammy Award	Best Spoken Word Album	Accessory to War	Nominated
2021	Primetime Emmy Award	Outstanding Guest Actor in a Drama Series	Lovecraft Country	Won
2021	Hollywood Critics Association TV Awards	Best Supporting Actor in a Broadcast Network or Cable Series, Drama	Lovecraft Country	Nominated
2021	Hollywood Critics Association TV Awards	Best Supporting Actor in a Limited Series, Anthology Series or Television Movie	Genius	Nominated
2021	Critics' Choice Television Awards	Best Supporting Actor in a Movie/Miniseries	Genius	Nominated
2024	Harvard Foundation for Intercultural and Race Relations	Artist of the Year	Himself	Won (Note: alongside his wife Angela Bassett)
2024	NAACP Image Awards	Outstanding Actor in a Television Movie, Mini-Series or Dramatic Special	Heist 88	Nominated
2024	Black Reel TV Awards	Outstanding Lead Performance in a Miniseries or TV Movie	Heist 88	Nominated

== Bibliography ==
- Vance, Courtney B.; Robin L. Smith; Charisse Jones (November 7, 2023). The Invisible Ache: Black Men Identifying Their Pain and Reclaiming Their Power. New York: Balance. ISBN 9781538725139. OCLC 1372393562.
