= Scott Glenn =

American actor

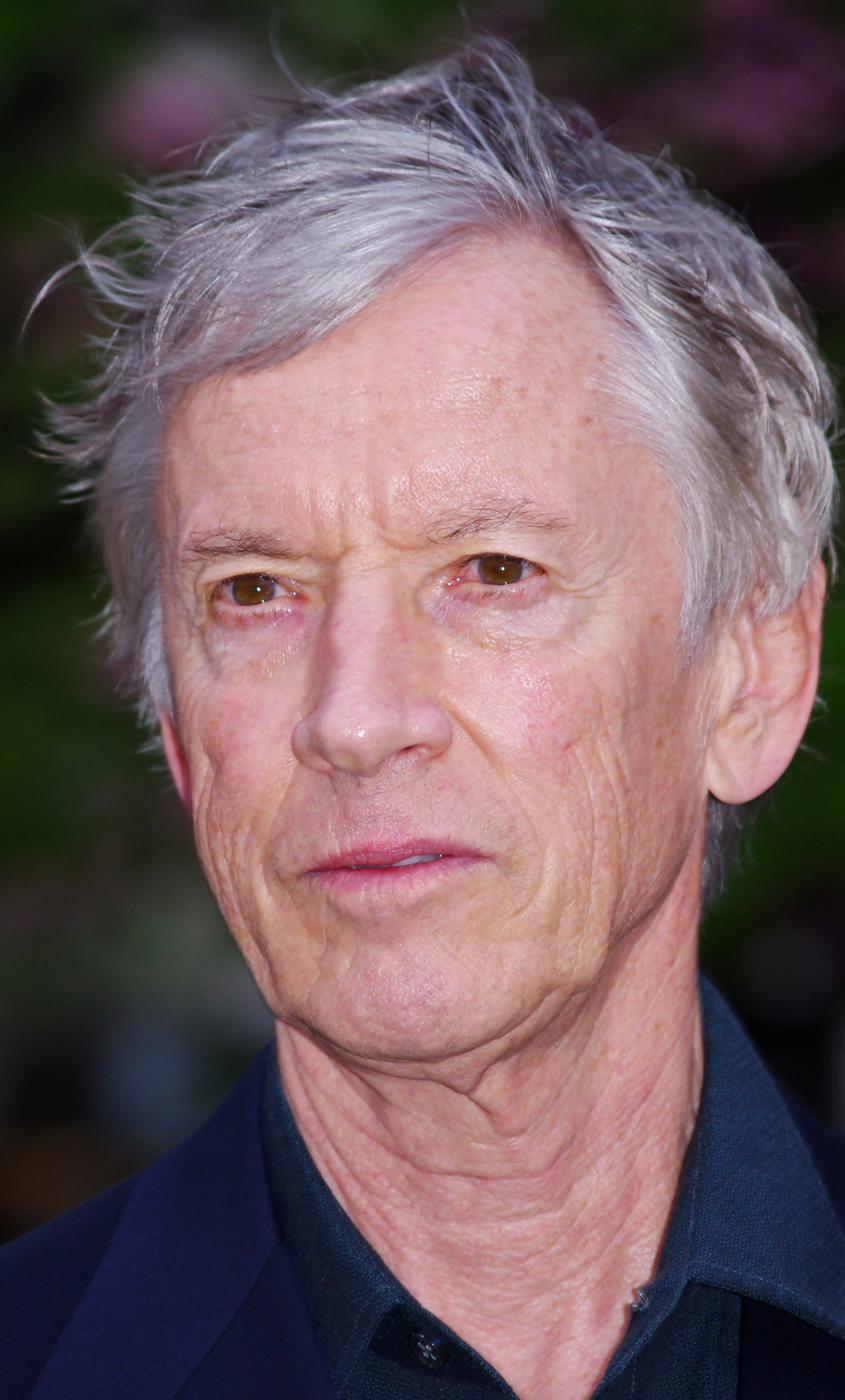
- Glenn in 2011
- Born: Theodore Scott Glenn; January 26 (Note: Glenn was born on January 26, but disagreement exists between sources over the year. Secondary sources put Glenn's year of birth between 1939 and 1941. Secondary sources: 1941: Glenn was listed as being 75 in a January 30, 2016 interview. He was also listed as being 76 in 2017.; 1939: Various interviews had him listed being born in 1939, as signified by a 2017 interview that listed him as 78 and an October 2024 interview that had him state his age as being 85, suggesting a birth of 1939. A 2025 interview with Variety also lists him as 86 and he listed himself as such for an interview with the Hollywood Reporter in August 2025. UPI lists his birthday as such.) (age 85–87); Pittsburgh, Pennsylvania, U.S.
- Education: College of William and Mary (BA)
- Occupation: Actor
- Years active: 1965–present
- Spouse: Carol Schwartz (m. 1968)
- Children: 2

Theodore Scott Glenn (born January 26 between 1939 and 1941) is an American actor. His roles have included Bill Lester in She Came to the Valley (1979), Pfc Glenn Kelly in Nashville (1975), Wes Hightower in Urban Cowboy (1980), astronaut Alan Shepard in The Right Stuff (1983), Emmett in Silverado (1985), Captain Bart Mancuso in The Hunt for Red October (1990), Jack Crawford in The Silence of the Lambs (1991), John Adcox in Backdraft (1991), Bill Burton in Absolute Power (1997), Roger in Training Day (2001), Ezra Kramer in The Bourne Ultimatum (2007), and Chris Chenery in Secretariat (2010).

On television, he played Kevin Garvey Sr. in the HBO television series The Leftovers (2014–2017), Stick in the Marvel Cinematic Universe television series Daredevil (2015–2016) and The Defenders (2017), and Jim Hollinger in The White Lotus (2025), for which he received a Primetime Emmy Award nomination.

== Early life ==
Glenn has Irish and Native American ancestry. During his childhood, he was regularly ill, and for a year was bedridden, including having scarlet fever. Through intense training in boxing, wrestling and tang soo do, he recovered from his illnesses, although he would limp for a couple of years.

After graduating from a Pittsburgh high school, Glenn entered the College of William & Mary, where he majored in English and graduated in 1961. In 1962, he joined the United States Marine Corps Reserve as an artilleryman and served for three years. He then worked for about seven months in 1963 as a news and sports reporter for the Kenosha News in Kenosha, Wisconsin. He tried to become an author, but found he could not write dialogue that satisfied the readers. To learn the art of dialogue, he began taking acting classes taught by William Hickey.

== Career ==
Glenn made his Broadway debut in The Impossible Years in 1965. He joined George Morrison’s acting class, helping direct student plays to pay for his studies and appearing onstage in La MaMa Experimental Theatre Club productions.

In 1968, he joined The Actors Studio and began working in professional theatre and TV. Two of Glenn's early television roles were as Hal Currin in the 1966 crime series Hawk, starring Burt Reynolds, and Calvin Brenner on the CBS daytime serial The Edge of Night. In 1970, director James Bridges offered him his first movie role, in The Baby Maker, released the same year.

Glenn spent eight years in Los Angeles, acting in small roles in films and doing TV stints, including a TV movie Gargoyles. In 1978, Glenn left Los Angeles with his family for Ketchum, Idaho, and worked as a barman, huntsman, and mountain ranger, occasionally acting in Seattle stage productions. He appeared in Francis Ford Coppola's Apocalypse Now (1979) and worked with directors such as Jonathan Demme and Robert Altman.

In 1980, he appeared as ex-convict Wes Hightower in Bridges' Urban Cowboy. After that, he starred in the World War II horror film, The Keep (1983), and action films such as Wild Geese II (1985) opposite Laurence Olivier, Silverado (1985), and The Challenge (1982), and drama films such as The Right Stuff (1983), TV film Countdown to Looking Glass (1984), The River (1984), and Off Limits (1988) as he alternately played good guys and bad guys during the 1980s. He returned to Broadway in Burn This in 1987. That same year, he tried his hand at gangster movies when he starred as the real-life sheriff turned gunman Verne Miller in the movie Gangland: The Verne Miller Story, which was given a theatrical release only in Finland and went straight to video in the US.

In the beginning of the 1990s, Glenn's career was at its peak as he appeared in several well-known films, such as The Hunt for Red October (1990), The Silence of the Lambs (1991), Backdraft (1991), and The Player (1992). He played a vicious mob hitman in a critically acclaimed performance in Night of the Running Man (1995). Later, he gravitated toward more challenging movie roles, such as in the Freudian farce Reckless (1995), tragicomedy Edie & Pen (1997), and Ken Loach's sociopolitical declaration Carla's Song. In the late 1990s, Glenn alternated between mainstream films (Courage Under Fire (1996), Absolute Power (1997)), independent projects (Lesser Prophets (1997) and Larga distancia (1998), written by his daughter Dakota Glenn) and TV (Naked City: A Killer Christmas (1998)). He was also cast in a supporting role in Training Day (2001). Glenn was cast in the FX drama Sons of Anarchy (2008), as Clay Morrow, but he was replaced after an early pilot episode by Ron Perlman. He portrayed Eugene van Wingerdt in a leading role in the thriller film The Barber. Glenn acted in the 2011 film Sucker Punch as Wise Man.

Glenn appeared in the drama Freedom Writers, in which he played the father of Hilary Swank's character, and in The Bourne Ultimatum and The Bourne Legacy as CIA Director Ezra Kramer. He played the character Stick in Netflix's television series Daredevil and returned to the character in The Defenders series a year later. In 2020, he played the grandfather in Greenland, opposite Gerard Butler and Morena Baccarin—an apocalyptic thriller about a comet destroying most of Earth. In 2024, he joined the cast of season 3 of the HBO series The White Lotus as Jim Hollinger, co-owner of the Thailand White Lotus resort.

In September 2025, Oldenburg International Film Festival paid tribute to Glenn with a retrospective of his career. The festival opened with the world premiere of Eugene the Marine, a film directed by Hank Bedford. The movie stars Glenn in the lead role of Eugene Lee Grady, a former marine struggling to keep his life together as his son is trying to force him out of his longtime home as a series of murders occur targeting the people around him.

== Personal life ==
He wed Carol Schwartz and upon their marriage, Glenn converted to Judaism, his wife's faith, from Catholicism. They have two daughters.

== Filmography ==
=== Film ===
Year	Title	Role	Notes
1970	The Baby Maker	Tad Jacks	
1971	Angels Hard as They Come	Long John	
1973	Hex	"Jimbang"	
1975	Nashville	Pfc. Glenn Kelly	
1976	Fighting Mad	Charlie Hunter	
1979	She Came to the Valley	Bill Lester	
1979	Apocalypse Now	Captain Richard M. Colby	
1979	More American Graffiti	Newt	
1980	Urban Cowboy	Wes Hightower	
1981	Cattle Annie and Little Britches	Bill Dalton	
1982	Personal Best	Terry Tingloff	
1982	The Challenge	Rick Murphy	
1983	The Right Stuff	Alan Shepard	
1983	The Keep	Glaeken Trismegetus	
1984	The River	Joe Wade	
1985	Wild Geese II	John Haddad	
1985	Silverado	Emmett	
1987	Gangland: The Verne Miller Story	Verne Miller	
1987	Man on Fire	Christian Creasy	
1988	Off Limits	Colonel Dexter Armstrong	
1989	Miss Firecracker	Mac Sam	
1990	The Hunt for Red October	Captain Bart Mancuso	
1991	The Silence of the Lambs	Jack Crawford	
1991	My Heroes Have Always Been Cowboys	H.D. Dalton	
1991	Backdraft	John "Axe" Adcox	Also performed stunts in the film
1992	The Player	Himself	
1993	Extreme Justice	Dan Vaughn	
1993	Slaughter of the Innocents	Stephen Broderick	
1995	Night of the Running Man	David Eckhart	
1995	The Spy Within	William B. Rickman	
1995	Tall Tale	J.P. Stiles	
1995	Reckless	Lloyd Buftalofty	
1996	Edie & Pen	Harry	
1996	Courage Under Fire	Tony Gartner	
1996	Carla's Song	Bradley	
1997	Absolute Power	Agent Bill Burton	
1997	Lesser Prophets	Iggy	
1998	Firestorm	Wynt Perkins	
1998	Larga distancia	Senor Grem	
1999	The Virgin Suicides	Father Moody	
1999	The Last Marshal	Cole	
2000	Vertical Limit	Montgomery Wick	
2001	Training Day	Roger	
2001	Buffalo Soldiers	1SG Robert E. Lee	
2001	The Shipping News	Jack Buggit	
2004	Puerto Vallarta Squeeze	Clayton Price	
2005	Magnificent Desolation: Walking on the Moon 3D	Charles Duke	Voice; Documentary film
2006	Journey to the End of the Night	Sinatra	
2007	Freedom Writers	Steve Gruwell	
2007	The Bourne Ultimatum	Ezra Kramer, Director of the CIA	
2007	Camille	Sheriff Foster	
2008	Surfer, Dude	Alister Greenbough	
2008	Nights in Rodanthe	Robert Torrelson	
2008	W.	U.S. Secretary of Defense Donald Rumsfeld	
2010	Secretariat	Christopher Chenery	
2011	Sucker Punch	The Wise Man / The General / The Bus Driver	
2011	Magic Valley	Ed Halfner	
2012	The Paperboy	W.W. Jansen	
2012	The Bourne Legacy	Ezra Kramer, Director of the CIA	
2014	The Barber	Eugene Van Wingerdt / Francis Allen Visser	
2015	Into the Grizzly Maze	Sully	
2020	Greenland	Dale	
2023	The Hill	Red Murff	
2025	Eugene the Marine	Gene Lee Grady	
2026	Greenland 2: Migration	Dale	

=== Television ===
Year	Title	Role	Notes
1965	The Patty Duke Show	Harry / Waiter	2 episodes
1966	Hawk	Hal Currin	Episode: "Wall of Silence"
1967	N.Y.P.D.	Roddy	Episode: "The Pink Gumdrop"
1969	The Edge of Night	Calvin Brenner	Episode: "#1.3490", uncredited
1971	The Young Lawyers	Nick Field	Episode: "The Outspoken Silence"
1971–73	Ironside	Lonnie Burnett / Frank Lenox	2 episodes
1972	The Streets of San Francisco	Junkie Gambler	Episode: "The Thirty-Year Pin", uncredited
1972	Gargoyles	James Reeger	Television film
1972	The Sixth Sense	Mark Hall	Episode: "And Scream by the Light of the Moon, the Moon"
1973	Emergency!	Forklift Driver	Episode: "Seance", uncredited
1975	Khan!		Episode: "Triad"
1975	Baretta	Dave	Episode: "A Bite of the Apple"
1984	Countdown to Looking Glass	Michael Boyle	Television film
1986	As Summers Die	Willie Croft	Television film
1988	Intrigue	Crawford	Television film
1989	The Outside Woman	Jesse Smith	Television film
1991	Women & Men 2	Henry	Television film
1993	Shadowhunter	John Cain	Television film
1994	Past Tense	Gene Ralston	Television film
1998	Naked City: Justice with a Bullet	Sgt. Daniel Muldoon	Television film
1998	Naked City: A Killer Christmas	Sgt. Daniel Muldoon	Television film
2001	The Seventh Stream	Owen Quinn	Television film
2003	A Painted House	Eli "Pappy" Chandler	Television film
2003	American Experience	Narrator	Voice; 2 episodes
2004	Homeland Security	Joe Johnson	Television film
2005	Gone, But Not Forgotten	Martin Darius / Peter Lake	Television film
2005	Faith of My Fathers	Jack McCain	Television film
2005	Hollywood's Greatest Villains	Himself	Television documentary
2005	Code Breakers	Earl "Red" Blaik	Television film
2008	Monk	Sheriff Rollins	2 episodes
2014–2017	The Leftovers	Kevin Garvey Sr.	11 episodes
2015–2016	Marvel's Daredevil	Stick	5 episodes
2017	Marvel's The Defenders	Stick	6 episodes
2018	Castle Rock	Alan Pangborn	8 episodes
2024	Bad Monkey	Jim Yancy	5 episodes
2025	The White Lotus	Jim Hollinger	3 episodes
