= Letterboxd =

Film discovery platform

- Screenshot Screenshot of a film entry page on Letterboxd, illustrating the platform's interface design.
- Website type: Social cataloging application
- Available in: English
- Headquarters: Auckland, New Zealand
- Owners: Tiny (60%), Matthew Buchanan and Karl von Randow (40%)
- Founders: Matthew Buchanan; Karl von Randow
- Website: letterboxd.com
- Commercial: Yes
- Registration: Optional
- Users: Over 30 million (as of July 2026)
- Launched: October 2011; 15 years ago
- Current status: Active

Letterboxd (/ˈlɛtərbɒkst/ LET-ər-bokst) is an online social cataloging service for film. It was founded in Auckland, New Zealand, by Matthew Buchanan and Karl von Randow in 2011. Available on web, iOS, Android, and Apple TV, it allows members to log, rate, review films, keep a diary of films watched, maintain watchlists, make curated lists, and follow other members’ activity. It has been described as "Goodreads for movies".

The platform has been majority owned by the Canadian investment company Tiny since 2023, with co-founders Matthew Buchanan and Karl von Randow continuing to lead the business independently. It has over 30 million members as of July 2026. In December 2025, Letterboxd launched Letterboxd Video Store, a curated digital film rental service.

== History ==
=== Founding ===
Letterboxd was founded by Matthew Buchanan and Karl von Randow, who launched a private version of the website at the Brooklyn Beta web conference in October 2011. Buchanan and von Randow had worked together since the 1990s, first at a web development agency and later at Cactuslab, a web and app design and development studio they founded in 2001.

Buchanan later said the concept had emerged from a gap he identified in the social media landscape of the late 2000s: while platforms existed for sharing music, photos and text, nothing comparable existed for film. The idea they developed was a film diary, a way for devoted film lovers to share the collecting, watching and cataloging they were already doing privately.

The name "Letterboxd" is based on the term letterboxing, the practice of placing black bars on the edges of a screen to preserve a movie's original aspect ratio.

Buchanan and von Randow launched an invitation-only beta version in April 2012 and opened the site to the general public in February 2013. Until March 2020, Letterboxd did not employ any full-time personnel. As of 2026, Letterboxd has over 40 employees, based in New Zealand, the United States, Canada, and the United Kingdom.

=== Acquisition by Tiny ===
In September 2023, a fund managed by Canadian investment company Tiny acquired a 60% majority stake in Letterboxd, valuing the company at around $50–$60M. Buchanan and von Randow continue to lead the company as CEO and CTO, each retaining a 20% ownership stake. Buchanan said at the time that the deal would leave "very little else" changed about how the platform operated.

Upon its acquisition, Letterboxd concurrently announced plans to add television shows to the platform. Due to Letterboxd's reliance on The Movie Database for its film data, limited-run series and a small number of recurring series had been loggable on the site for years. Buchanan acknowledged that the decision to add TV shows was met with some controversy by the Letterboxd community, but assured users that the introduction of television to the platform would not disrupt the existing user experience.

In April 2026, Semafor reported that Tiny was seeking a buyer for its 60% stake in Letterboxd. A campaign to buy the stake through a public benefit corporation launched in May 2026. In July 2026, it was reported that several parties—including Netflix, Sony Pictures Entertainment, Paramount Skydance, Versant, internet entrepreneur and investor Alexis Ohanian, and equity companies TPG and Redbird—were in early talks to purchase Letterboxd.

On September 24, 2026, Sony Pictures continued its bidding war for Letterboxd with A24 and The New York Times, as Letterboxd considered getting a new name under new ownership. As of September 2026, the deal would cost $300M.

On October 8, 2026, Madison Wells Media gained interest in buying Letterboxd.

On November 5, 2026, it was reported that The New York Times Company was in advanced talks to buy Letterboxd from Tiny for $330M.

=== Growth ===
Letterboxd's membership grew significantly during the COVID-19 pandemic and accelerated in subsequent years. Its member count rose from 1.8M in 2020 to 3M in January 2021, 10M in September 2023, 12M in February 2024, 15M four months later in June, and 17M by the end of 2024. Ten million new members joined between January 2025 and January 2026, bringing total membership to over 30M as of July 2026.

In May 2017, Letterboxd members collectively logged their 100 millionth film; they reached the 1 billion mark on July 19, 2022. In 2025, members logged 898.5M films (+28% on 2024), wrote 143.6M reviews (+49% on 2024), cast 672.5M ratings (+36% on 2024), and created 12.9M lists (+88% on 2024).

As of May 2026, members had logged over 750 movies at least 1M times each—the oldest being Disney's Snow White and the Seven Dwarfs (1937)—and over 160 movies at least 3M times each. In February 2025, Barbie (2023) became the first film to be logged 5M times on the platform.

Six films have held the title of highest-rated narrative feature on Letterboxd: The Godfather (1972), Parasite (2019), Everything Everywhere All at Once (2022), Come and See (1985), Spider-Man: Across the Spider-Verse (2023), and Harakiri (1962). As of July 2026, Harakiri is the current title-holder. Letterboxd has an Official Lists HQ where members can track how films are performing on the platform.

In March 2024, Letterboxd disclosed that it had suffered a data breach the previous February via a compromised staff account. The company said the breaching party had accessed "significantly less than 1% of all accounts."

== Features ==
=== Core functionality ===
Anyone can browse content on Letterboxd without an account. Registered members can log, rate, and review films, tag them with keywords, and add them to watchlists or curated lists. Members may also display their four favorite films on their profile, a feature that has become widely recognized beyond the platform. A follower model enables members to follow others and receive updates on their activity. Lists can be made public, shared with specific users, or kept private.

Letterboxd is available as a mobile app for Android and iOS, and as an app for Apple TV.

=== Paid membership features ===
Since opening to the public in February 2013, Letterboxd has offered a tiered membership structure, with both free and paid memberships. Paid subscribers (Pro and Patron tiers) receive a range of additional features, including ad-free browsing, individual user statistics (such as hours spent watching films, favorite directors, and ratings distributions), and a tool that identifies whether a film is available on a streaming service to which the user subscribes, activity feed filtering, list cloning, and other features. The Patron tier additionally allows users to customize film posters and backdrops on their profile, allowing for personal preference and distinct displays from other users.

In September 2020, Letterboxd announced a new "HQ" membership tier for film-related organizations, such as movie theaters, studios, festivals, and podcasts. HQ members can post news stories, link to external websites, and access platform analytics.

=== Film data ===
All film-related metadata used on the website is supplied by The Movie Database (TMDb), an open source database. In September 2019, the site partnered with JustWatch to display online viewing options for films. In March 2022, the site partnered with Nanocrowd to show "nanogenres" and recommendations for similar films to users. In December 2023, Letterboxd partnered with the aggregator Assemble to launch a feature identifying showtimes and links to ticketing websites for movies that were currently in theaters. The feature applies to movie theaters in the United States, Canada, the United Kingdom, Ireland, New Zealand, and Australia.

=== Letterboxd Video Store ===
In May 2025, Letterboxd announced Letterboxd Video Store at the Cannes Film Festival. The service formally launched on December 10, 2025, with films available across 23 countries. It operates as a transactional video on demand (TVOD) platform requiring no subscription, and is available via web, iOS, Android, Apple TV 4K, Chromecast, and AirPlay.

The service offers a rotating selection of titles organized into curated "shelves" programmed using data drawn from member watchlists, ratings, and reviews. Its two founding shelves were "Unreleased Gems"—festival titles without wider distribution, available for limited windows—and "Lost & Found," featuring underseen titles including restorations and films previously unavailable in certain territories. Deadline described Letterboxd as having "emerged as a potent shaper of audience opinion," with the Video Store cited as a key driver of its growing influence on independent film distribution.

Video Store also features selections chosen by guest curators, with the first in January 2026 being a series of French New Wave classics curated by Richard Linklater to promote his film Nouvelle Vague (2025).

The 2025 horror thriller It Ends was included in the first Unreleased Gems shelf on the Video Store; Neon acquired worldwide rights to the film on December 18, 2025, eight days into its run on the platform. By August 2026, five titles from the Unreleased Gems shelf had gone on to wider distribution: It Ends, Lemonade Blessing, Tinsman Road, Eugene the Marine, and The Mysterious Gaze of the Flamingo. Lemonade Blessing was acquired by Antenna Releasing and Eugene the Marine was acquired by Cineverse, both for North American distribution following their runs on the platform. IndieWire described the Video Store as "a real, if unpredictable, alternative to the traditional festival-to-distributor pipeline."

The Wrap named Letterboxd Video Store one of the biggest entertainment innovations of 2025.

== Community and cultural impact ==
Letterboxd has been described as one of the most influential online film communities. Publications including The New York Times Magazine, Variety, The Guardian, Deadline Hollywood, The Wrap, and The Independent have credited the platform with influencing film criticism, independent film discovery, and cinema-going among younger audiences. Variety described it as "a throwback to an internet that increasingly doesn't exist," adding that the site "cultivates a sense of discovery created by and for users."

In 2026, Letterboxd was named to TIME's 100 Most Influential Companies list in the Pioneer category, and ranked in Fast Company's Most Innovative Companies list (Top 3, Social Media). The New York Times Magazine described the platform as central to the future of film culture.

The New York Times Magazine also described Letterboxd as 'a cinephilic hive buzzing with authentic enthusiasm and heterogeneous tastes,' contrasting it with review aggregator Rotten Tomatoes as a more homogenizing influence on film culture. The Washington Post described the platform as harking "back to the just-so-distant past, when the internet felt carefree," noting that it was founded not in Silicon Valley but in New Zealand, "where everything is a bit out of step with the rest of the world."

The New York Times wrote that content on the platform ranges widely, from "obscure memes, diaristic essays and sprawling screeds packed with pseudo-academic jargon", to unconventional criticism that gives a voice to writers who might otherwise not be heard. The platform has been criticized for gamifying the act of watching films and boosting sardonic one-line reviews over more in-depth assessments. GQ described the platform as having "managed to create an easy sense of community, like the olden days of pre-Musk Twitter," while noting that being "Letterboxd-pilled" had become cultural shorthand for serious cinephilia. Film critic Scott Tobias called Letterboxd "the safest space for film discussion we've got." Sony Pictures Motion Picture Group CEO Tom Rothman has said of the platform: "To have a community like Letterboxd, whose focus is on not just films but a willingness to take some risks and a willingness to embrace and champion some new voices? Boy, we need that."

=== "Letterboxd generation" ===
The term letterboxd generation has been used by people in the film industry to refer young people interested in film.

At the Cannes Film Festival in May 2025, filmmaker Richard Linklater used the phrase Letterboxd generation saying: "I call them the Letterboxd generation, they're all online, it means a lot to them, they go to the movies, they talk about them, they have a big community."

At the Toronto International Film Festival in September 2025, NBCUniversal chairperson Donna Langley identified the Letterboxd generation as a defining audience for the industry, noting that young people were attending theaters repeatedly, forming opinions, and actively seeking out ways to share them. Langley added that engagement on platforms like Letterboxd needed to happen organically: "You cannot manufacture that. It has to be authentic."

At CinemaCon in April 2026, Warner Bros. Motion Picture Group chairman Michael De Luca also invoked the term, telling theater owners: "We are at a crucial, critical moment in time with this audience. The Letterboxd generation is only growing."

=== Four Favorites ===
The "Four Favorites" feature, which allows members to pin four films to the top of their profile, has become a prominent element of film publicity. Letterboxd's editorial team conducts red carpet and junket interviews in which filmmakers, actors, and celebrities are asked to name their four favorite films.

The format gained significant traction around 2023 and has since become a fixture of film promotion. The Washington Post noted that "a Letterboxd interview is fast becoming a don't-skip promo stop," comparing it to Hot Ones as a promotional format. It has been described by The Guardian as "our era's cinematic confession booth," with each clip featuring "the red carpet backdrop, the jaunty music, the snappy edits, the cheerful pings as posters slide into place." Participants have included Nicolas Cage, Adam Sandler, Jennifer Lawrence, Keanu Reeves, Tom Hanks, Ryan Gosling, and Emily Blunt, among many others. The Godfather (1972) is the most frequently cited film in these interviews, named by actors including Bryan Cranston, Jeff Goldblum, Michelle Yeoh, Michael Fassbender, and Ralph Macchio.

=== Notable members ===
Several notable filmmakers, actors, and public figures have created Letterboxd accounts. Director Martin Scorsese opened a Letterboxd account in October 2023 and quickly became the most-followed user on the site. Ayo Edebiri maintained an account from 2018, gaining attention for her humorous and candid film reviews before deleting the account in 2025. Charli XCX is an active member who has logged and reviewed films on the platform. Kyle MacLachlan is an active member known for his prolific logging and reviews on the platform. Ed Sheeran revealed his account in April 2025, saying "No one reads it, it's just for me to log it."

Filmmakers Francis Ford Coppola, Michael Mann, Mike Flanagan, Sean Baker, and Edgar Wright have created Letterboxd profiles to post their lists of recommended films. The Academy of Motion Picture Arts and Sciences (AMPAS) later announced a formal partnership with the platform in 2023.

In recent years, several celebrities' private Letterboxd accounts have been exposed and scrutinized online. Fran Hoepfner of Vulture criticized the practice of publicizing such accounts, arguing that it can make reviews feel sponsored or inauthentic, and dubbed it "boxxeding" (a portmanteau of "Letterboxd" and "doxxing"). Confirmed accounts include Jack Harlow, Wim Wenders, Mason Thames, Iman Vellani, Lukas Gage, and Kid Cudi, while those of Margot Robbie and Hudson Williams were alleged.

== See also ==
- Douban
- Kinopoisk
- Metacritic
- Rotten Tomatoes
