= 34th NAACP Image Awards =

2003 media and literature awards

- Date: March 08, 2003
- Site: Universal Amphitheatre, Los Angeles, California
- Hosted by: Cedric the Entertainer
- Official website: NAACPImageAwards.net

Highlights
- Best Picture: Antwone Fisher
- Best Comedy Series: The Bernie Mac Show
- Best Drama Series: Soul Food

Television coverage
- Network: Fox

The 34th NAACP Image Awards, presented by the NAACP, honored outstanding representations and achievements of people of color in motion pictures, television, music, and literature during the 2002 calendar year. The ceremony was hosted by Cedric the Entertainer and took place on March 8, 2003, at the Universal Amphitheatre in Los Angeles. It aired a few days later on March 13, 2003, on the Fox network.

== Nominations ==
The nominations were announced on December 5, 2002, at The Pacific Design Center in Hollywood, California. Both Brown Sugar and Barbershop, which received eight and five nominations respectively, failed to win any awards on the night. The nomination of Barbershop was seen as a somewhat controversial choice.

All nominees are listed below, with the winners listed first in boldface.

== Special awards ==
Hall of Fame Inductee	Chairman's Award	President's Award
**Spike Lee**	**Danny Glover**	**Venus and Serena Williams**

== Motion Picture ==
Outstanding Motion Picture
**Antwone Fisher**; Barbershop; Brown Sugar; Drumline; John Q
Outstanding Actor in a Motion Picture	Outstanding Actress in a Motion Picture
**Denzel Washington – John Q**; Taye Diggs – Brown Sugar; Morgan Freeman – High Crimes; Ice Cube – Barbershop; Samuel L. Jackson – Changing Lanes	**Angela Bassett – Sunshine State**; Vivica A. Fox – Juwanna Mann; Sanaa Lathan – Brown Sugar; Jennifer Lopez – Maid in Manhattan; Thandiwe Newton – The Truth About Charlie
Outstanding Supporting Actor in a Motion Picture	Outstanding Supporting Actress in a Motion Picture
**Denzel Washington – Antwone Fisher**; Anthony Anderson – Barbershop; Cedric the Entertainer – Barbershop; Boris Kodjoe – Brown Sugar; Mos Def – Brown Sugar	**Halle Berry – Die Another Day**; Kimberly Elise – John Q; Eve Jihan Jeffers – Barbershop; Queen Latifah – Brown Sugar; Nicole Ari Parker – Brown Sugar

== Television series and streaming ==
=== Drama ===
Outstanding Drama Series
**Soul Food**; 24; Boston Public; Six Feet Under; The Wire
Outstanding Actor in a Drama Series	Outstanding Actress in a Drama Series
**Michael Beach – Third Watch**; Bill Bellamy – Fastlane; Andre Braugher – Hack; Dennis Haysbert – 24; Mykelti Williamson – Boomtown	**Vanessa Williams – Soul Food**; Nicole Ari Parker – Soul Food; CCH Pounder – The Shield; Lorraine Toussaint – Any Day Now; Malinda Williams – Soul Food
Outstanding Supporting Actor in a Drama Series	Outstanding Supporting Actress in a Drama Series
**Gary Dourdan – CSI: Crime Scene Investigation**; Charles S. Dutton – Without a Trace; Boris Kodjoe – Soul Food; Aaron Meeks – Soul Food; Mekhi Phifer – ER	**Loretta Devine – Boston Public**; Kimberly Elise – Soul Food; Pam Grier – Law & Order: SVU; Rita Moreno – OZ; Anna Deavere Smith – The West Wing
Outstanding Actor in a Daytime Drama Series	Outstanding Actress in a Daytime Drama Series
**Kristoff St. John – The Young and the Restless**; Peter Parros – As the World Turns; Nathan Purdee – One Life to Live; Paul Taylor – As the World Turns; Darnell Williams – All My Children	**Victoria Rowell – The Young and the Restless**; Tracey Ross – Passions; Eva LaRue – All My Children; Tamara Tunie – As the World Turns; Tonya Lee Williams – The Young and the Restless

=== Comedy ===
Outstanding Comedy Series
**The Bernie Mac Show**; Girlfriends; My Wife and Kids; One on One; The Parkers
Outstanding Actor in a Comedy Series	Outstanding Actress in a Comedy Series
**Bernie Mac – The Bernie Mac Show**; Flex Alexander – One on One; Cedric the Entertainer – Cedric the Entertainer Presents; D. L. Hughley – The Hughleys; Damon Wayans – My Wife and Kids	**Tisha Campbell-Martin – My Wife and Kids**; Golden Brooks – Girlfriends; Mo’Nique – The Parkers; Tracee Ellis Ross – Girlfriends; Kellita Smith – The Bernie Mac Show
Outstanding Supporting Actor in a Comedy Series	Outstanding Supporting Actress in a Comedy Series
**Cedric the Entertainer – The Proud Family**; Michael Boatman – Arli$$; David Alan Grier – Life With Bonnie; Ving Rhames – The Proud Family; Jeremy Suarez – The Bernie Mac Show	**Terri J. Vaughn – The Steve Harvey Show**; Dee Dee Davis – The Bernie Mac Show; Regina Hall – Ally McBeal; Wendy Raquel Robinson – Cedric the Entertainer Presents; Camille Winbush – The Bernie Mac Show

=== Television movie, limited-series or dramatic special ===
Outstanding Television Movie, Mini-Series or Dramatic Special
**The Rosa Parks Story**; 10,000 Black Men Named George; Keep the Faith, Baby; The Middle Passage; Whitewash: The Clarence Brandley Story
Outstanding Actor in a Television Movie, Mini-Series or Dramatic Special	Outstanding Actress in a Television Movie, Mini-Series or Dramatic Special
**Charles S. Dutton – 10,000 Black Men Named George**; Andre Braugher – 10,000 Black Men Named George; Omar Epps – Conviction; Harry Lennix – Keep the Faith, Baby; Ving Rhames – Sins of the Father	**Angela Bassett – The Rosa Parks Story**; Gloria Reuben – Little John; Jackie Richardson – Sins of the Father; Vanessa L. Williams – Keep the Faith, Baby; N'Bushe Wright – Widows

=== Other ===
Outstanding News/Information – Series or Special	Outstanding Variety – Series or Special
BET Tonight with Ed Gordon: **"R. Kelly" (Part I)**; 60 Minutes II: "A Nation Divided"; ABC News Nightline Up Close: "Dr. Ben Carson"; Biography: "Johnnie Cochran – The Best Defense"; The Rise and Fall of Jim Crow: Episode I, "Promises Betrayed 1865–1896"	**BET's 8th Annual Walk of Fame: A Tribute to Stevie Wonder**; Behind the Music: "Bob Marley"; Cedric the Entertainer Presents; Russell Simmons Presents Def Poetry Jam; The 2002 Essence Awards
Outstanding Performance by a Youth (Series, Special, Television Movie or Limited-series)
**LeVar Burton – Reading Rainbow**; Tommy Davidson – The Proud Family; Jo Marie Payton – The Proud Family; Kyla Pratt – The Proud Family; Keshia Knight Pulliam – What About Your Friends: Weekend Getaway

== Recording ==
Outstanding Album	Outstanding New Artist
**Kirk Franklin** **– The Rebirth of Kirk Franklin**; India.Arie – Voyage to India; Nelly – Nellyville; Musiq – Juslisen; Various artists – Brown Sugar soundtrack	**Ashanti**; Kelly Rowland; Tweet; Floetry; Amerie
Outstanding Male Artist	Outstanding Female Artist
**LL Cool J**; Musiq; Nelly; Mos Def; Carlos Santana	**India.Arie**; Mary J. Blige; Missy Elliott; Erykah Badu; Ashanti
Outstanding Music Video	Outstanding Duo, Group or Collaboration
"**No More Drama**" **– Mary J. Blige, directed by Sanjii**; "Little Things" – India.Arie, directed by Sanaa Hamri; "Love of My Life" – Erykah Badu feat. Common, directed by Chris Robinson and Erykah Badu; "U Don’t Have to Call" – Usher, directed by Little X; "Luv U Better" – LL Cool J, directed by Benny Boom	**India.Arie** **and Stevie Wonder**; Mary Mary; TLC; Erykah Badu feat. Common; The Roots
Outstanding Song
**"Brighter Day"** **– songwriter/artist: Kirk Franklin**; "No More Drama" – songwriters: James Harris III, Terry Lewis, Barry De Vorzan and Perry Botkin Jr.; artist: Mary J. Blige; "Little Things" – songwriters: Hawk Wolinski, Andre Fischer, I. Simpson, Shannon Sanders and Anthony Robertson; artist: India.Arie; "Love of My Life" – songwriters: Erykah Badu and Lonnie Rashid Lynn Jr.; artist: Erykah Badu feat. Common; "Work It" – songwriters: Missy Elliott and Timbaland Mosley; artist: Missy Elliott
Outstanding Gospel Artist (Traditional or Contemporary)	Outstanding Jazz Artist
**Kirk Franklin**; Mary Mary; Fred Hammond; BeBe Winans; The Blind Boys of Alabama	**Natalie Cole**; Al Jarreau; Will Downing; Branford Marsalis; Joshua Redman

== Literature ==
Outstanding Literary Work – Fiction	Outstanding Literary Work – Nonfiction
**Quilting the Black-Eyed Pea** **– Nikki Giovanni**; The Bondswoman's Narrative – Hannah Crafts; Henry Louis Gates Jr., Editor; The Emperor of Ocean Park – Stephen L. Carter; A Love of My Own – E. Lynn Harris; Thieves' Paradise – Eric Jerome Dickey	**Keeping the Faith: Stories of love, courage, healing, and hope from Black America** **– Tavis Smiley**; Bill Clinton and Black America – DeWayne Wickham; Growing Up X – Ilyasah Shabazz; A Song Flung Up to Heaven – Maya Angelou; Zora Neale Hurston: A Life in Letters – Carla Kaplan, Editor
Outstanding Literary Work – Children
**Nelson Mandela's Favorite African Folktales – Nelson Mandela, Editor**; Hip Kid Hop: And the Winner is – LL Cool J; Please, Baby, Please – Spike Lee and Tonya Lewis Lee; A Rainbow All Around Me – Sandra Pinkney; When Marian Sang: The True Recital of Marian Anderson: The Voice of a Century – Pam Munoz Ryan and Brian Selznick (illustrator)
