= NAACP Image Award for Outstanding Literary Work – Nonfiction =

Nonfiction literary award from the NAACP

This article lists the winners and nominees for the NAACP Image Award for Outstanding Literary Work – Nonfiction. Maya Angelou, Michael Eric Dyson, and Barack Obama hold the record for most wins in this category, with two each.

== Winners and nominees ==
=== 1990s ===
Award winners, 1994-1999
Year	Book	Author	Result	Ref.
1994	By Any Means Necessary: The Trials and Tribulations of the Making of 'Malcolm X'	Spike Lee and Ralph Wiley	Winner	
1996
1996	When We Were Colored	Clifton Taulbert	Winner	
1999
1999	With Ossie & Ruby: In This Life Together	Ossie Davis and Ruby Dee	Winner	

=== 2000s ===
Award winners, 2002-2009
Year	Book	Author	Result	Ref.
2002	Sally Hemings, An American Scandal	Tina Andrews	Winner	
2003	Keeping the Faith	Tavis Smiley	Winner	
2003	A Song Flung Up to Heaven	Maya Angelou	Finalist	
2003	Bill Clinton and Black America	DeWayne Wickham	Finalist	
2003	Growing Up X	Ilyasah Shabazz	Finalist	
2003	Zora Neale Hurston: A Life in Letters	Carla Kaplan	Finalist	
2004	Why I Love Black Women	Michael Eric Dyson	Winner	
2005	Hallelujah! The Welcome Table	Maya Angelou	Winner	
2006	Is Bill Cosby Right? Or Has the Black Middle Class Lost Its Mind?	Michael Eric Dyson	Winner	
2006	Blue Rage, Black Redemption: A Memoir	Stanley Williams	Finalist	
2006	The Autobiography of Medgar Evers: A Hero's Life and Legacy Revealed Through His Writings, Letters and Speeches	Manning Marable and Myrlie Evers-Williams	Finalist	
2006	50 Years After Brown: The State of Black Equality in America	Anthony Asadullah Samad	Finalist	
2006	Winning the Race: Beyond the Crisis in Black America	John McWhorter	Finalist	
2007	The Audacity of Hope: Thoughts on Reclaiming the American Dream	Barack Obama	Winner	
2007	Come Hell or High Water: Hurricane Katrina and the Color of Disaster	Michael Eric Dyson	Finalist	
2007	The Covenant with Black America	Stanley Williams	Finalist	
2007	Forty Million Dollar Slaves: The Rise, Fall, and Redemption of the Black Athlete	William C. Rhoden	Finalist	
2007	Not in My Family: AIDS in the African American Community	Gil L. Robertson	Finalist	
2008	Not on Our Watch	Don Cheadle and John Prendergast	Winner	
2008	An Unbroken Agony: Haiti, From Revolution to the Kidnapping of a President	Randall Robinson	Finalist	
2008	Brother, I'm Dying	Edwidge Danticat	Finalist	
2008	Know What I Mean?: Reflections on Hip-Hop	Michael Eric Dyson	Finalist	
2008	Race and Racism in the Chinas: Chinese Racial Attitudes Toward Africans and African-Americans	M. Dujon Johnson	Finalist	
2009	Letter to My Daughter	Maya Angelou	Winner	

=== 2010s ===
Award winners, 2010-2019
Year	Book	Author	Result	Ref.
2010	In Search of Our Roots	Henry Louis Gates Jr.	Winner	
2010	Freedom in My Heart: Voices From the United States National Slavery Museum	Cynthia Carter	Finalist	
2010	Our Choice	Al Gore	Finalist	
2010	Brain Surgeon: A Doctor's Inspiring Encounters With Mortality and Miracles	Arnold Mann and Keith Black	Finalist	
2010	Family Affair: What It Means to Be African American Today	Gil L. Robertson	Finalist	
2011	The New Jim Crow: Mass Incarceration in the Age of Colorblindness	Michelle Alexander	Winner	
2011	Brainwashed: Challenging the Myth of Black Inferiority	Tom Burrell	Finalist	
2011	Hands on the Freedom Plow: Personal Accounts of Women in SNCC	Faith S. Holsaert	Finalist	
2011	Surviving and Thriving 365 Days in Black Economic History	Julianne Malveaux	Finalist	
2011	The History of White People	Nell Irvin Painter	Finalist	
2012	The Wealth Cure: Putting Money in Its Place	Hill Harper	Winner	
2012	Sister Citizen: Shame, Stereotypes, and Black Women in America	Melissa Harris-Perry	Finalist	
2012	Super Rich	Russell Simmons	Finalist	
2012	The Cosmopolitan Canopy	Elijah Anderson	Finalist	
2012	Who's Afraid of Post-Blackness?: What It Means to Be Black Now	Touré	Finalist	
2013	The Oath: The Obama White House and the Supreme Court	Jeffrey Toobin	Winner	
2013	Fraternity	Diane Brady	Finalist	
2013	Guest of Honor: Booker T. Washington, Theodore Roosevelt, and the White House Dinner That Shocked a Nation	Deborah Davis	Finalist	
2013	Power Concedes Nothing: One Woman's Quest for Social Justice in America, from the Courtroom to the Kill Zones	Connie Rice	Finalist	
2013	The Courage to Hope	Shirley Sherrod	Finalist	
2014	Envisioning Emancipation: Black Americans and the End of Slavery	Deborah Willis and Barbara Krauthamer	Winner	
2014	Bartlett's Familiar Black Quotations: 5,000 Years of Literature, Lyrics, Poems, Passages, Phrases, and Proverbs from Voices Around the World	Retha Powers	Finalist	
2014	High Price: A Neuroscientist's Journey of Self-Discovery That Challenges Everything You Know About Drugs and Society	Carl Hart	Finalist	
2014	Letters to an Incarcerated Brother: Encouragement, Hope, and Healing for Inmates and Their Loved Ones	Hill Harper	Finalist	
2014	The African Americans: Many Rivers to Cross	Henry Louis Gates Jr. and Donald Yacovone	Finalist	
2015	Just Mercy: A Story of Justice and Redemption	Bryan Stevenson	Winner	
2015	Bad Feminist	Roxane Gay	Finalist	
2015	Place Not Race: A New Vision of Opportunity in America	Sheryll Cashin	Finalist	
2015	Who We Be: The Colorization of America	Jeff Chang	Finalist	
2016	Spectacle: The Astonishing Life of Ota Benga	Pamela Newkirk	Winner	
2016	50 Billion Dollar Boss: African American Women Sharing Stories of Success in Entrepreneurship and Leadership	Kathey Porter and Andrea Hoffman	Finalist	
2016	Ghettoside: A True Story of Murder in America	Jill Leovy	Finalist	
2016	Showdown: Thurgood Marshall and the Supreme Court Nomination That Changed America	Wil Haygood	Finalist	
2016	The Light of the World	Elizabeth Alexander	Finalist	
2017	Hidden Figures	Margot Lee Shetterly	Winner	
2017	Democracy in Black: How Race Still Enslaves the American Soul	Eddie S. Glaude	Finalist	
2017	Stamped from the Beginning: The Definitive History of Racist Ideas in America	Ibram X. Kendi	Finalist	
2017	Writings on the Wall: Searching for a New Equality Beyond Black and White	Kareem Abdul-Jabbar and Raymond Obstfeld	Finalist	
2018	Defining Moments in Black History: Reading Between the Lies	Dick Gregory (posthumous)	Winner	
2018	Black Detroit – A People’s History of Self-Determination	Herb Boyd	Finalist	
2018	Chokehold: Policing Black Men	Paul Butler	Finalist	
2018	The President's Kitchen Cabinet: The Story of the African Americans Who Have Fed Our First Families, from the Washingtons to the Obamas	Adrian Miller	Finalist	
2018	We Were Eight Years In Power: An American Tragedy	Ta-Nehisi Coates	Finalist	
2019	For Colored Girls Who Have Considered Politics	Donna Brazile, Yolanda Caraway, Leah D. Daughtry, Minyon Moore, Veronica Chambers	Winner	
2019	Barracoon: The Story of the Last "Black Cargo"	Zora Neale Hurston	Finalist	
2019	Black Girls Rock! Owning Our Magic. Rocking Our Truth	Beverly Bond	Finalist	
2019	May We Forever Stand: A History of the Black National Anthem	Imani Perry	Finalist	
2019	The Sun Does Shine: How I Found Life and Freedom on Death Row	Anthony Ray Hinton and Lara Love Hardin	Finalist	

=== 2020s ===
Award winners, 2020-present
Year	Book	Author	Result	Ref.
2020	The Source of Self-Regard: Selected Essays, Speeches, and Meditations	Toni Morrison	Winner	
2020	Breathe: A Letter to My Sons	Imani Perry	Finalist	
2020	STONY THE ROAD: Reconstruction, White Supremacy, and the Rise of Jim Crow	Henry Louis Gates Jr.	Finalist	
2020	The Yellow House	Sarah M. Broom	Finalist	
2020	What Doesn't Kill You Makes You Blacker: A Memoir in Essay	Damon Young	Finalist	
2021	A Promised Land	Barack Obama	Winner	
2021	A Black Women's History of the United States	Daina Ramey Berry and Kali Nicole Gross	Finalist	
2021	Driving While Black	Gretchen Sorin	Finalist	
2021	Long Time Coming: Reckoning with Race in America	Michael Eric Dyson	Finalist	
2021	We're Better Than This	Elijah Cummings	Finalist	
2022	The 1619 Project: A New Origin Story	Nikole Hannah-Jones	Winner	
2022	Dance Theatre of Harlem	Judy Tyrus and Paul Novosel	Finalist	
2022	Just As I Am	Cicely Tyson	Finalist	
2022	My Remarkable Journey	Katherine Johnson	Finalist	
2022	Renegades: Born in the USA	Barack Obama and Bruce Springsteen	Finalist	
2023	Finding Me	Viola Davis	Winner	
2023	Grace: President Obama and Ten Days in the Battle for America	Cody Keenan	Finalist	
2023	Under the Skin: The Hidden Toll of Racism on American Lives and on the Health of Our Nation	Linda Villarosa	Finalist	
2023	Who’s Black and Why?: A Hidden Chapter from the Eighteenth-Century Invention of Race	Henry Louis Gates Jr. and Andrew S. Curran	Finalist	
2023	Requiem for the Massacre: A Black History on the Conflict, Hope, and Fallout of the 1921 Tulsa Race Massacre	RJ Young	Finalist	
2024	The New Brownies’ Book	Karida L. Brown and Charly Palmer	Winner	
2024	Black AF History: The Un–Whitewashed Story of America	Michael Harriot	Finalist	
2024	BLK ART: The Audacious Legacy of Black Artists and Models in Western Art	Zaria Ware	Finalist	
2024	Iconic Home: Interiors, Advice, and Stories from 50 Amazing Black Designers	Black Interior Designers and June Reese	Finalist	
2024	The Art of Ruth E. Carter	Ruth E. Carter	Finalist	
2025	Love & Whiskey: The Remarkable True Story of Jack Daniel, His Master Distiller Nearest Green, and the Improbable Rise of Uncle Nearest	Fawn Weaver	Winner	
2025	Passionate Mind in Relentless Pursuit: The Vision of Mary McLeod Bethune	Noliwe Rooks	Finalist	
2025	Picturing Black History: Photographs and Stories that Changed the World	Daniela Edmeier, Damarius Johnson, Nicholas B. Breyfogle and Steven Conn	Finalist	
2025	The 1619 Project: A Visual Experience	Nikole Hannah-Jones and The New York Times Magazine	Finalist	
2025	The Jazzmen: How Duke Ellington, Louis Armstrong, and Count Basie Transformed America	Larry Tye	Finalist	
2026	A More Perfect Party: The Night Shirley Chisholm & Diahann Carroll Reshaped Politics	Juanita Tolliver	Winner	
2026	Born in Flames	Bench Ansfield	Finalist	
2026	From These Roots	Tamara Lanier	Finalist	
2026	Hidden Hospitality: Untold Stories of Black Hotel, Motel, and Resort Owners from the Pioneer Days to the Civil Rights Era	Calvin Stovall Jr.	Finalist	
2026	I Am Nobody’s Slave	Lee Hawkins	Finalist	

== Multiple wins and nominations ==
=== Wins ===
2 wins

- Maya Angelou
- Michael Eric Dyson
- Barack Obama

=== Nominations ===
5 nominations

- Michael Eric Dyson

3 nominations

- Maya Angelou

2 nominations

- Henry Louis Gates Jr.
- Hill Harper
- Barack Obama
- Gil L. Robertson
- Tavis Smiley
- Imani Perry
