= NAACP Image Award for Outstanding Motion Picture =

American film award

NAACP Image Award for Best Motion Picture
- Awarded for: NAACP Image Award for Outstanding Motion Picture
- Date: February 22, 2025
- Presented by: NAACP
- First award: Lady Sings the Blues (1972)
- Currently held by: Sinners (2026)

Highlights
- Most awards: 13
- Most nominations: 18

This article lists the winners and nominees for the NAACP Image Award for Outstanding Motion Picture, awarded by the U.S.-based National Association for the Advancement of Colored People (NAACP). This award has been given since 1972 and as of 2017, only two of the winning films have also won the Academy Award for Best Picture: Crash and 12 Years a Slave.

Sinners holds the record of the most nominations and wins for a Motion Picture, with 18 nominations and 13 wins, a record previously held for 2 years by The Color Purple (2023), who had the most nominations at 13 nominations and 11 wins.

== Nominees and winners ==
Winners are listed first and highlighted in bold. Year refers to year of ceremony, not year of release.

=== 1970s ===
Year	Film	Ref
1972
1972	**Lady Sings the Blues**	
1973 – 1975	—N/a	
1976
1976	**Let's Do It Again**	
1977	—N/a	
1978
1978	**The Greatest**	—N/a
1979	—N/a	

=== 1980s ===
Year	Film	Ref
1980
1980	**Fame**	
1981
1981	**Bustin' Loose**	
1982
1982	**An Officer and a Gentleman**	
1982	Diva	
1982	Ragtime	
1982	Rocky III	
1983 – 1984	—N/a	
1985
1985	**A Soldier's Story**	
1986
1986	**The Color Purple**	
1987
1987	**Lethal Weapon**	
1987	Beverly Hills Cop II	
1987	Hollywood Shuffle	
1987	Round Midnight	
1988
1988	**Coming to America**	
1988	School Daze	
1988	Cry Freedom	
1988	Shoot to Kill	
1989
1989	**Lean on Me**	
1989	Do the Right Thing	
1989	Tap	
1989	Lethal Weapon 2	
1989	I'm Gonna Git You Sucka	

=== 1990s ===
Year	Film	Ref
1990
1990	**Glory**	
1991	—N/a	
1992
1992	**Boyz n the Hood**	
1992	The Five Heartbeats	
1992	Jungle Fever	
1992	To Sleep with Anger	
1992	New Jack City	
1993
1993	**Sister Act**	
1993	Mississippi Masala	
1993	Boomerang	
1993	Daughters of the Dust	
1993	Grand Canyon	
1994
1994	**Malcolm X**	
1994	Bopha!	
1994	Menace II Society	
1994	Posse	
1994	What's Love Got to Do with It	
1995	—N/a	
1996
1996	**Waiting to Exhale**	
1996	Crimson Tide	
1996	Cry, the Beloved Country	
1996	Devil in a Blue Dress	
1996	Othello	
1997
1997	**A Time to Kill**	
1997	Courage Under Fire	
1997	Get on the Bus	
1997	Once Upon a Time...When We Were Colored	
1997	The Preacher's Wife	
1998
1998	**Soul Food**	
1998	Amistad	
1998	Eve's Bayou	
1998	Love Jones	
1998	Rosewood	
1999
1999	**How Stella Got Her Groove Back**	
1999	Beloved	
1999	Down in the Delta	
1999	Enemy of the State	
1999	He Got Game	

=== 2000s ===
Year	Film	Ref
2000
2000	**The Best Man**	
2000	The Hurricane	
2000	Life	
2000	The Matrix	
2000	The Wood	
2001
2001	**Remember the Titans**	
2001	Love & Basketball	
2001	Men of Honor	
2001	The Original Kings of Comedy	
2001	Shaft	
2002
2002	**Ali**	
2002	Baby Boy	
2002	The Brothers	
2002	Rush Hour 2	
2002	Training Day	
2003
2003	**Antwone Fisher**	
2003	BarberShop	
2003	Brown Sugar	
2003	Drumline	
2003	John Q	
2004
2004	**The Fighting Temptations**	
2004	Bad Boys II	
2004	Bend It Like Beckham	
2004	Deliver Us from Eva	
2004	Whale Rider	
2005
2005	**Ray**	
2005	Collateral	
2005	Fahrenheit 9/11	
2005	Hotel Rwanda	
2005	Man on Fire	
2006
2006	**Crash**	
2006	Coach Carter	
2006	Diary of a Mad Black Woman	
2006	Hitch	
2006	Hustle & Flow	
2007
2007	**The Pursuit of Happyness**	
2007	Akeelah and the Bee	
2007	Blood Diamond	
2007	Catch a Fire	
2007	Dreamgirls	
2008
2008	**The Great Debaters**	
2008	American Gangster	
2008	I Am Legend	
2008	Talk to Me	
2008	Why Did I Get Married?	
2009
2009	**The Secret Life of Bees**	
2009	Cadillac Records	
2009	The Family That Preys	
2009	Miracle at St. Anna	
2009	Seven Pounds	

=== 2010s ===
Year	Film	Ref
2010
2010	**Precious**	
2010	The Blind Side	
2010	Invictus	
2010	Michael Jackson's This Is It	
2010	The Princess and the Frog	
2011
2011	**For Colored Girls**	
2011	The Book of Eli	
2011	Just Wright	
2011	The Kids Are All Right	
2011	Why Did I Get Married Too?	
2012
2012	**The Help**	
2012	The First Grader	
2012	Jumping the Broom	
2012	Pariah	
2012	Tower Heist	
2013
2013	**Red Tails**	
2013	Beasts of the Southern Wild	
2013	Django Unchained	
2013	Flight	
2013	Good Deeds	
2014
2014	**12 Years a Slave**	
2014	The Best Man Holiday	
2014	The Butler	
2014	Fruitvale Station	
2014	Mandela: Long Walk to Freedom	
2015
2015	**Selma**	
2015	Belle	
2015	Beyond the Lights	
2015	Dear White People	
2015	Get On Up	
2016
2016	**Straight Outta Compton**	
2016	Beasts of No Nation	
2016	Concussion	
2016	Creed	
2016	Dope	
2017
2017	**Hidden Figures**	
2017	The Birth of a Nation	
2017	Fences	
2017	Loving	
2017	Moonlight	
2018
2018	**Girls Trip**	
2018	Detroit	
2018	Get Out	
2018	Marshall	
2018	Roman J. Israel, Esq.	
2019
2019	**Black Panther**	
2019	BlacKkKlansman	
2019	Crazy Rich Asians	
2019	The Hate U Give	
2019	If Beale Street Could Talk	

=== 2020s ===
Year	Film	Ref
2020
2020	**Just Mercy**	
2020	Dolemite Is My Name	
2020	Harriet	
2020	Queen & Slim	
2020	Us	
2021
2021	**Bad Boys for Life**	
2021	Da 5 Bloods	
2021	Jingle Jangle: A Christmas Journey	
2021	Ma Rainey's Black Bottom	
2021	One Night in Miami...	
2022
2022	**The Harder They Fall**	
2022	Judas and the Black Messiah	
2022	King Richard	
2022	Respect	
2022	The United States vs. Billie Holiday	
2023
2023	**Black Panther: Wakanda Forever**	
2023	A Jazzman's Blues	
2023	Emancipation	
2023	The Woman King	
2023	Till	
2024
2024	**The Color Purple**	
2024	American Fiction	
2024	Origin	
2024	Rustin	
2024	They Cloned Tyrone	
2025
2025	**The Six Triple Eight**	
2025	Wicked	
2025	The Piano Lesson	
2025	Bob Marley: One Love	
2025	Bad Boys: Ride or Die	
2026
2026	**Sinners**	
2026	Highest 2 Lowest	
2026	One of Them Days	
2026	Sarah's Oil	
2026	Wicked: For Good	

== Stats and facts ==
Below are the films that garnered multiple nominations and wins in the category of Outstanding Motion Picture.

=== Most wins ===
Rank	1st	2nd	3rd	4th	5th	6th
Film	Sinners	The Color Purple	Precious; Black Panther	The Six Triple Eight	12 Years a Slave; Hidden Figures; The Best Man; The Great Debaters; Malcolm X; Moonlight; Ray; Selma; Soul Food; Waiting to Exhale	For Colored Girls; The Help; How Stella Got Her Groove Back; Jumping the Broom; The Preacher's Wife
Total wins	13 wins	11 wins	6 wins	5 wins	4 wins	3 wins

=== Most nominations ===
Rank	1st	2nd	3rd	4th	5th	6th	7th	8th
Film	Sinners	The Color Purple	The Piano Lesson	The Best Man; Black Panther; Jingle Jangle: A Christmas Journey	Black Panther: Wakanda Forever; Precious; The Secret Life of Bees	Brown Sugar; The Butler; Cadillac Records; Dreamgirls; The Great Debaters; The Help; Selma	Beloved; Eve's Bayou; For Colored Girls; Pariah; Ray; The Woman King; Waiting to Exhale	12 Years a Slave; A Time to Kill; Crash; Creed; Jumping the Broom; Moonlight; The Preacher's Wife; Talk to Me; Till
Total Nominations	18 nominations	16 nominations	13 nominations	10 nominations	9 nominations	8 nominations	7 nominations	6 nominations
