= Yacovone =

Yacovone is a surname. Notable people with the surname include:

- David Yacovone (born 1954), American politician
- Donald Yacovone (born 1952), American researcher, writer and academic
