= 45th NAACP Image Awards =

American entertainment awards for 2013 works

- Date: February 21–22, 2014
- Site: Los Angeles, California
- Hosted by: Rickey Smiley; Kimberly Elise; Anthony Anderson
- Official website: NAACPImageAwards.net

The 45th NAACP Image Awards, presented by the NAACP, honored outstanding representations and achievements of people of color in motion pictures, television, music and literature during the 2013 calendar year. The awards were presented in two separate ceremonies. The first ceremony honoring non-televised categories took place on February 21, 2014, hosted by Rickey Smiley and Kimberly Elise. The second was broadcast live on TV One on February 22, hosted by Anthony Anderson. All nominees are listed below with the winners listed in bold.

== Motion picture ==
=== Outstanding Motion Picture ===
- **12 Years a Slave**
- Fruitvale Station
- Lee Daniels' The Butler
- Mandela: Long Walk to Freedom
- The Best Man Holiday

=== Outstanding Actor in a Motion Picture ===
- **Forest Whitaker - Lee Daniels' The Butler**
- Chadwick Boseman - 42
- Chiwetel Ejiofor - 12 Years a Slave
- Idris Elba - Mandela: Long Walk to Freedom
- Michael B. Jordan - Fruitvale Station

=== Outstanding Actress in a Motion Picture ===
- **Angela Bassett - Black Nativity**
- Halle Berry - The Call
- Jennifer Hudson - Winnie Mandela
- Kerry Washington - Tyler Perry Presents Peeples
- Nicole Beharie - 42

=== Outstanding Supporting Actor in a Motion Picture ===
- **David Oyelowo - Lee Daniels' The Butler**
- Cuba Gooding Jr. - Lee Daniels' The Butler
- Morris Chestnut - The Best Man Holiday
- Terrence Howard - Lee Daniels' The Butler
- Terrence Howard - The Best Man Holiday

=== Outstanding Supporting Actress in a Motion Picture ===
- **Lupita Nyong'o - 12 Years a Slave**
- Alfre Woodard - 12 Years a Slave
- Naomie Harris - Mandela: Long Walk to Freedom
- Octavia Spencer - Fruitvale Station
- Oprah Winfrey - Lee Daniels' The Butler

=== Outstanding Independent Motion Picture ===
- **Fruitvale Station**
- Blue Caprice
- Dallas Buyers Club
- The Inevitable Defeat of Mister & Pete
- The Trials of Muhammad Ali

=== Outstanding International Motion Picture ===
- **War Witch (Item 7)**
- Call Me Kuchu (Lindy Hop Pictures LLC)
- High Tech, Low Life (Argot Pictures)
- La Playa D.C. (Burning Blue)
- Lion Ark (ADI Films)

== Television ==
=== Outstanding Drama Series ===
- **Scandal (ABC)**
- Boardwalk Empire (HBO)
- Grey's Anatomy (ABC)
- The Good Wife (CBS)
- Treme (HBO)

=== Outstanding Comedy Series ===
- **Real Husbands of Hollywood (BET)**
- House of Lies (Showtime)
- Modern Family (ABC)
- The Game (BET)
- The Soul Man (TV Land)

=== Outstanding Talk Series ===
- **Steve Harvey (Syndicated)**
- Oprah's Lifeclass (OWN)
- Oprah's Next Chapter (OWN)
- The Arsenio Hall Show (Syndicated)
- The Queen Latifah Show (Syndicated)

=== Outstanding Actor in a Drama Series ===
- **LL Cool J - NCIS: Los Angeles (CBS)**
- James Pickens Jr. - Grey's Anatomy (ABC)
- Michael Ealy - Almost Human (FOX)
- Shemar Moore - Criminal Minds (CBS)
- Wendell Pierce - Treme (HBO)

=== Outstanding Actress in a Drama Series ===
- **Kerry Washington - Scandal (ABC)**
- Chandra Wilson - Grey's Anatomy (ABC)
- Khandi Alexander - Treme (HBO)
- Nicole Beharie - Sleepy Hollow (FOX)
- Regina King - SouthLAnd (TNT)

=== Outstanding Actor in a Comedy Series ===
- **Kevin Hart - Real Husbands of Hollywood (BET)**
- Andre Braugher - Brooklyn Nine-Nine (FOX)
- Cedric the Entertainer - The Soul Man (TV Land)
- Don Cheadle - House of Lies (Showtime)
- Dulé Hill - Psych (USA Network)

=== Outstanding Actress in a Comedy Series ===
- **Wendy Raquel Robinson - The Game (BET)**
- Aisha Tyler - Archer (FX Networks)
- Mindy Kaling - The Mindy Project (FOX)
- Niecy Nash - The Soul Man (TV Land)
- Tasha Smith - Tyler Perry's For Better or Worse (OWN)

=== Outstanding Supporting Actor in a Comedy Series ===
- **Morris Chestnut - Nurse Jackie (Showtime)**
- Boris Kodjoe - Real Husbands of Hollywood (BET)
- Jerry "J. B. Smoove" Brooks - Real Husbands of Hollywood (BET)
- Nick Cannon - Real Husbands of Hollywood (BET)
- Tracy Morgan - 30 Rock (NBC)

=== Outstanding Supporting Actress in a Comedy Series ===
- **Brandy Norwood - The Game (BET)**
- Anna Deavere Smith - Nurse Jackie (Showtime)
- Nia Long - House of Lies (Showtime)
- Rashida Jones - Parks and Recreation (NBC)
- Sofia Vergara - Modern Family (ABC)

=== Outstanding Supporting Actor in a Drama Series ===
- **Joe Morton - Scandal (ABC)**
- Columbus Short - Scandal (ABC)
- Guillermo Díaz - Scandal (ABC)
- Jeffrey Wright - Boardwalk Empire (HBO)
- Michael Kenneth Williams - Boardwalk Empire (HBO)

=== Outstanding Supporting Actress in a Drama Series ===
- **Taraji P. Henson - Person of Interest (CBS)**
- Archie Panjabi - The Good Wife (CBS)
- Debbie Allen - Grey's Anatomy (ABC)
- Diahann Carroll - White Collar (USA)
- Vanessa L. Williams - 666 Park Avenue (ABC)

=== Outstanding Television Movie, Mini-Series or Dramatic Special ===
- **Being Mary Jane (BET)**
- Betty & Coretta (Lifetime)
- CrazySexyCool: The TLC Story (VH1)
- Luther (BBC America)
- Muhammad Ali's Greatest Fight (HBO)

=== Outstanding Actor in a Television Movie, Mini-Series or Dramatic Special ===
- **Idris Elba - Luther (BBC America)**
- Chiwetel Ejiofor - Dancing on the Edge (Starz)
- Danny Glover - Muhammad Ali's Greatest Fight (HBO)
- Malik Yoba - Betty & Coretta (Lifetime)
- Omari Hardwick - Being Mary Jane (BET)

=== Outstanding Actress in a Television Movie, Mini-Series or Dramatic Special ===
- **Gabrielle Union - Being Mary Jane (BET)**
- Angela Bassett - American Horror Story: Coven (FX Networks)
- Angela Bassett - Betty & Coretta (Lifetime)
- Gabourey Sidibe - American Horror Story: Coven (FX Networks)
- Keke Palmer - CrazySexyCool: The TLC Story (VH1)

=== Outstanding Actor in a Daytime Drama Series ===
- **Kristoff St. John - The Young and the Restless (CBS)**
- Aaron D. Spears - The Bold and the Beautiful (CBS)
- Lawrence Saint Victor - The Bold and the Beautiful (CBS)
- Redaric Williams - The Young and the Restless (CBS)
- Tequan Richmond - General Hospital (ABC)

=== Outstanding Actress in a Daytime Drama Series ===
- **Tatyana Ali - The Young and the Restless (CBS)**
- Angell Conwell - The Young and the Restless (CBS)
- Christel Khalil - The Young and the Restless (CBS)
- Karla Mosley - The Bold and the Beautiful (CBS)
- Kristolyn Lloyd - The Bold and the Beautiful (CBS)

=== Outstanding News/ Information - (Series or Special) ===
- **The African Americans: Many Rivers to Cross with Henry Louis Gates, Jr. (PBS)**
- Justice for Trayvon (BET)
- Mandela: Freedom's Father (BET)
- Oprah: Where Are They Now? (OWN)
- Unsung (TV One)

=== Outstanding Reality Series ===
- **Iyanla: Fix My Life (OWN)**
- Shark Tank (ABC)
- Sunday Best (BET)
- The Voice (NBC)
- Welcome to Sweetie Pie's (OWN)

=== Outstanding Variety Series or Special ===
- **Black Girls Rock! (BET)**
- 12 Years A Slave: A TV One Special with Cathy Hughes (TV One)
- Key & Peele (Comedy Central)
- Mike Tyson: Undisputed Truth (HBO)
- Oprah's Master Class (OWN)

=== Outstanding Children's Program ===
- **2013 HALO Awards (Nickelodeon/TeenNick)**
- A.N.T. Farm (Disney Channel)
- Dora the Explorer (Nickelodeon)
- Big Time Rush (Nickelodeon/TeenNick)

=== Outstanding Performance in a Youth/ Children's Program - (Series or Special) ===
- **China Anne McClain - A.N.T. Farm (Disney Channel)**
- Fatima Ptacek - Dora the Explorer (Nickelodeon)
- Karan Brar - Jessie (Disney Channel)
- Zendaya - Shake It Up (Disney Channel)

== Writing ==
=== Outstanding Writing in a Comedy Series ===
- **Vincent Brown - A.N.T. Farm - "influANTces" (Disney Channel)**
- Erica Montolfo-Bura - The Game - "In Treatment" (BET)
- Karin Gist - House of Lies - "Sincerity is an Easy Disguise in This Business" (Showtime)
- Mara Brock Akil - The Game - "The Blueprint I & II" (BET)
- Ralph Farquhar, Chris Spencer - Real Husbands of Hollywood - "Rock, Paper, Stealers" (BET)

=== Outstanding Writing in a Dramatic Series ===
- **Janine Sherman Barrois - Criminal Minds - "Strange Fruit" (CBS)**
- Aaron Rahsaan Thomas - SouthLAnd - "Babel" (TNT)
- Chitra Elizabeth Sampath, Damian Kindler - Sleepy Hollow - "Sanctuary" (FOX)
- Karin Gist - Revenge - "Mercy" (ABC)
- Sara Hess - Orange Is the New Black - "Blood Donut" (Netflix)

=== Outstanding Writing in a Motion Picture - (Theatrical or Television) ===
- **John Ridley - 12 Years a Slave (River Road/ Plan B/ New Regency/ Fox Searchlight Pictures)**
- Alfonso Cuarón, Jonás Cuarón - Gravity (Warner Bros. Pictures)
- Brian Helgeland - 42 (Warner Bros. Pictures/Legendary Pictures)
- Danny Strong - Lee Daniels' The Butler (The Weinstein Company/Lee Daniels Entertainment, Laura Ziskin Productions, Windy Hill Pictures, Follow Through Productions, Salamander Pictures, Pam Williams Productions)
- Ryan Coogler - Fruitvale Station (The Weinstein Company/Forest Whitaker's Significant Productions, OG Project)

== Directing ==
=== Outstanding Directing in a Motion Picture - (Theatrical or Television) ===
- **Steve McQueen - 12 Years a Slave**
- Jono Oliver - Home
- Justin Chadwick - Mandela: Long Walk to Freedom
- Lee Daniels - Lee Daniels' The Butler
- Malcolm D. Lee - The Best Man Holiday

=== Outstanding Directing in a Comedy Series ===
- **Millicent Shelton - The Hustle - "Rule 4080" (FUSE)**
- Anton Cropper - House of Lies - "Sincerity Is an Easy Disguise in This Business" (Showtime)
- Eric Dean Seaton - Mighty Med - "Saving The People Who Save People" (Disney XD)
- Paris Barclay - Glee - "Diva" (FOX)
- Stan Lathan - Real Husbands of Hollywood - "Rock, Paper, Stealers" (BET)

=== Outstanding Directing in a Dramatic Series ===
- **Regina King - SouthLAnd - "Off Duty" (TNT)**
- Carl Franklin - House of Cards - "Chapter 11" (Netflix)
- Ernest Dickerson - Treme - "Dippermouth Blues" (HBO)
- Millicent Shelton - The Fosters - "Clean" (ABC Family)
- Rob Hardy - Criminal Minds - "Carbon Copy" (CBS)

== Music ==
=== Outstanding New Artist ===
- **K. Michelle (Atlantic Records)**
- Ariana Grande (Republic Records)
- Candice Glover (19 Recordings/Interscope Records)
- RaVaughn Brown (Columbia Records)
- Zendaya (Hollywood Records)

=== Outstanding Male Artist ===
- **John Legend (Columbia Records)**
- Bruno Mars (Atlantic Records)
- Charlie Wilson (RCA Records)
- Justin Timberlake (RCA Records)
- Robin Thicke (Star Trak/Interscope)

=== Outstanding Female Artist ===
- **Beyoncé (Columbia Records)**
- India.Arie (Motown Records)
- Janelle Monáe (Bad Boy/Atlantic)
- Ledisi (Verve Records)
- Mary J Blige (Verve Records/Interscope)

=== Outstanding Duo, Group or Collaboration ===
- **"Blurred Lines" - Robin Thicke feat. T.I. & Pharrell (Star Trak/Interscope)**
- "#Beautiful" - Mariah Carey feat. Miguel (Island Def Jam)
- "Fire We Make" - Alicia Keys feat. Maxwell (RCA Records)
- "Hurt You" - Toni Braxton feat. Babyface (Motown Records)
- "Suit & Tie" - Justin Timberlake feat. Jay-Z (RCA Records)

=== Outstanding Jazz Album ===
- **The Songs of Stevie Wonder - SFJAZZ Collective (SFJAZZ Records)**
- Summer Horns - Dave Koz, Gerald Albright, Mindi Abair, Richard Elliot (Concord Records)
- The Beat - Boney James (Concord Records)
- The Messenger - Kevin Eubanks (Mack Avenue Records)
- The Morning After: A Musical Love Journey - Najee (Shanachie)

=== Outstanding Gospel Album - (Traditional or Contemporary) ===
- **Best Days Deluxe Edition - Tamela Mann (Tillymann Music)**
- 20 Year Celebration Volume 1 - Best For Last - Donald Lawrence (Quietwater Entertainment/eOne Music)
- Azusa: The Next Generation - Hezekiah Walker (RCA Inspiration)
- Good God - Shirley Caesar (eOne Music)
- Music from the Motion Picture Black Nativity - Various (RCA Inspiration)

=== Outstanding World Music Album ===
- **Natalie Cole en Español - Natalie Cole (Verve Records)**
- Coming from a Lady - Lady Ele (13 Black Records)
- Live at the Royal Albert Hall - Emeli Sandé (Capitol)
- Sing to the Moon - Laura Mvula (Columbia Records)
- The Standards - Gloria Estefan (Masterworks)

=== Outstanding Music Video ===
- **"Q.U.E.E.N." - Janelle Monáe feat. Erykah Badu (Bad Boy/Atlantic)**
- "Cocoa Butter" - India.Arie (Motown Records)
- "Fire We Make" - Alicia Keys feat. Maxwell (RCA Records)
- "Made to Love" - John Legend (Columbia Records)
- "Treasure" - Bruno Mars (Atlantic Records)

=== Outstanding Song ===
- **"All of me" - John Legend (Columbia Records)**
- "Blurred Lines" - Robin Thicke feat. T.I. & Pharrell (Star Trak/Interscope)
- "Fire We Make" - Alicia Keys feat. Maxwell (RCA Records)
- "Q.U.E.E.N." - Janelle Monáe feat. Erykah Badu (Bad Boy/Atlantic)
- "Treasure" - Bruno Mars (Atlantic Records)

=== Outstanding Album ===
- **Love, Charlie - Charlie Wilson (RCA Records)**
- The 20/20 Experience – 2 of 2 - Justin Timberlake (RCA Records)
- Blurred Lines - Robin Thicke (Star Trak/Interscope)
- Love in the Future - John Legend (Columbia Records)
- The Electric Lady - Janelle Monáe (Bad Boy/Atlantic)

== Literature ==
=== Outstanding Literary Work - Fiction ===
- **Anybody's Daughter - Pamela Samuels Young (Goldman House Publishing)**
- A Deeper Love Inside: The Porscha Santiaga Story - Sister Souljah (Atria/Emily Bestler Books)
- Little Green: An Easy Rawlins Mystery - Walter Mosley (Doubleday)
- Never Say Never: A Novel - Victoria Christopher Murray (Touchstone/Simon & Schuster)
- Who Asked You? - Terry McMillan (Viking)

=== Outstanding Literary Work - Non-Fiction ===
- **Envisioning Emancipation: Black Americans and the End of Slavery - Deborah Willis, Barbara Krauthamer (Temple University Press)**
- Bartlett's Familiar Black Quotations: 5,000 Years of Literature, Lyrics, Poems, Passages, Phrases, and Proverbs from Voices Around the World - Retha Powers (Little, Brown and Company)
- Letters to an Incarcerated Brother: Encouragement, Hope, and Healing for Inmates and Their Loved Ones - Hill Harper (Gotham Books)
- The African Americans: Many Rivers to Cross - Henry Louis Gates Jr., Donald Yacovone (SmileyBooks)

=== Outstanding Literary Work - Debut Author ===
- **Nine Years Under - Sheri Booker (Gotham Books)**
- Better Than Good Hair - The Curly Girl Guide to Healthy Gorgeous Natural Hair! - Nikki Walton with Ernessa T. Carter (HarperCollins- Amistad)
- Ghana Must Go - Taiye Selasi (The Penguin Press)
- On The Come Up - Hannah Weyer (Nan A. Talese/Doubleday)
- The Returned - Jason Mott (Harlequin MIRA)

=== Outstanding Literary Work - Biography/ Auto-Biography ===
- **The Rebellious Life of Mrs. Rosa Parks - Jeanne Theoharis (Beacon Press)**
- Buck: A Memoir - M. K. Asante (Spiegel & Grau)
- Duke: A Life of Duke Ellington - Terry Teachout (Gotham Books)
- Kansas City Lightning: The Rise and Times of Charlie Parker - Stanley Crouch (HarperCollins, Harper)
- Mom & Me & Mom - Maya Angelou (Random House)

=== Outstanding Literary Work - Instructional ===
- **The Vegucation of Robin: How Real Food Saved My Life - Robin Quivers (Avery)**
- Do I Look Like An ATM? A Parent's Guide to Raising Financially Responsible African American Children - Sabrina Lamb (Chicago Review Press)
- Plan D: How to Lose Weight and Beat Diabetes (Even If You Don't Have It) – Sherri Shepherd with Billie Fitzpatrick (HarperCollins, It Books)
- Recruiting and Retaining Culturally Different Students in Gifted Education - Donna Y. Ford, Ph.D. (Prufrock Press Inc.)
- The Entrepreneur Mind: 100 Essential Beliefs, Characteristics, and Habits of Elite Entrepreneurs - Kevin D. Johnson (Johnson Media Inc.)

=== Outstanding Literary Work - Poetry ===
- **Turn Me Loose: The Unghosting of Medgar Evers - Frank X Walker (University of Georgia Press)**
- Chasing Utopia: A Hybrid - Nikki Giovanni (HarperCollins, William Morrow)
- Hum - Jamaal May (Alice James Books)
- The Cineaste: Poems - A. Van Jordan (W. W. Norton & Company, Inc.)
- The Collected Poems of Ai - Ai (W. W. Norton & Company, Inc.)

=== Outstanding Literary Work - Children ===
- **Nelson Mandela - Kadir Nelson (HarperCollins Children's Books/Katherine Tegen Books)**
- I'm A Pretty Little Black Girl! - Betty K. Bynum (Author), Claire Armstrong-Parod (Illustrator) (Dream Title Publishing)
- Knock Knock: My Dad's Dream for Me - Daniel Beaty (Author), Bryan Collier (Illustrator) (Little, Brown Books for Young Readers)
- Martin & Mahalia: His Words, Her Song - Andrea Davis Pinkney (Author), Brian Pinkney (Illustrator) (Little, Brown Books for Young Readers)
- You Never Heard of Willie Mays?! - Jonah Winter (Author), Terry Widener (Illustrator) (RH Children's Books; Schwartz & Wade)

=== Outstanding Literary Work - Youth/Teens ===
- **Courage Has No Color, The True Story of the Triple Nickles: America's First Black Paratroopers - Tanya Lee Stone (Candlewick Press)**
- God's Graffiti: Inspiring Stories for Teens - Romal Tune (Judson Press)
- Invasion - Walter Dean Myers (Scholastic Press/Scholastic)
- Raising the Bar - Gabrielle Douglas (Zondervan)
- Serafina's Promise: A Novel In Verse - Ann E. Burg (Scholastic Press/Scholastic)

== Documentaries ==
=== Outstanding Documentary - (Theatrical) ===
- **Free Angela and All Political Prisoners (Codeblack Films/Lionsgate)**
- 20 Feet from Stardom (Tremolo & Gil Friesen Productions)
- Call Me Kuchu (Lindy Hop Pictures LLC)
- Girl Rising (The Documentary Group)
- The New Black (Promised Land Film)

=== Outstanding Documentary - (Television) ===
- **Richard Pryor: Omit the Logic (Showtime)**
- Life Is But a Dream (HBO)
- Dark Girls (OWN)
- Venus Vs. (ESPN)
- Whoopi Goldberg Presents Moms Mabley (HBO)

== Honorary ==
=== Entertainer of the Year ===
- **Kevin Hart**

=== NAACP Chairman's Award ===
- **Forest Whitaker**

=== Image Awards Hall of Fame ===
- **Paris Barclay**
- **Cheryl Boone Isaacs**
