= Chokehold: Policing Black Men =

2017 non fiction book by Paul Butler

- Author: Paul Butler
- Subjects: Criminal justice, race discrimination, race relations
- Genre: non-fiction
- Published: July 11, 2017
- Publisher: The New Press
- ISBN: 9781595589057

Chokehold: Policing Black Men is a 2017 non fiction book by Paul Butler. It was nominated for the NAACP Image Award for Outstanding Literary Work in the Nonfiction category in 2018.
