= Real Husbands of Hollywood =

American television sitcom

- Genre: Comedy; Satire
- Created by: Kevin Hart; Chris Spencer
- Starring: Kevin Hart; Nick Cannon; Boris Kodjoe; Duane Martin; Nelly; J. B. Smoove; Robin Thicke; Cynthia McWilliams; Dondré Whitfield
- Country of origin: United States
- Original language: English
- No. of seasons: 5
- No. of episodes: 58 (+ 2 specials)

Production
- Executive producers: Chris Spencer; Dave Becky; Jesse Collins; Kevin Hart; Ralph Farquhar; Stan Lathan; Stephen Hill; Tim Gibbons; Carl Craig
- Editors: Charles Kramer; AJ Catoline; Heidi Scharfe
- Camera setup: Single
- Running time: 20–22 minutes
- Production companies: HartBeat Productions; JSR Productions; 3 Arts Entertainment; Jesse Collins Entertainment (2022); BET Originals

Original release
- Network: BET
- Release: January 15, 2013 – December 13, 2016
- Network: BET+
- Release: February 10, 2022

Real Husbands of Hollywood (abbreviated RHOH) is an American reality television parody that originally aired on BET from January 15, 2013, to December 13, 2016. A revival series produced for streaming service BET+ premiered on February 10, 2022.

== Background ==
The series was co-created by comedian Kevin Hart, and follows the daily lives of him and other married celebrities, each playing a fictionalized version of themselves, as they venture through their surreal life in Hollywood. Members of the initial cast include: Boris Kodjoe, Nelly, Duane Martin, J. B. Smoove, Nick Cannon, Oliver (Hart's assistant, played by James Davis), and Robin Thicke, who did not return for the second season due to his music career, though Hart stated that the door is open for Thicke to return. Thicke returned to appear in four episodes of the follow-up series Real Husbands of Hollywood: More Kevin, More Problems.

The series is intentionally filmed in a style similar to Bravo's The Real Housewives. Episodes often hinge on the "real" Kevin Hart's desperately unsuccessful attempts to climb Hollywood's celebrity social ladder (which always backfire in humiliating ways), and the character's barely-hidden jealousy of his more successful celebrity friends. A sneak peek was shown as a segment during the 2012 BET Awards and the official promo was released in October 2012.

== Cast ==
- Kevin Hart as himself
- Duane Martin as himself
- Nelly as himself
- Cynthia McWilliams as Trina Shaw
- Boris Kodjoe as himself
- Nick Cannon as himself
- Robin Thicke as himself
- J. B. Smoove as himself
- Jackie Long as himself
- Dondre Whitfield as himself
- James Davis as Oliver Grant
- Erica Ash/Angel Conwell as Bridgette Hart
- Raquel Lee as Charmagne
- Tiffany Haddish as Tiffany
- Tom Fitzpatrick as Coleman
- Demarius Mack as Calvin/Fat Jesus

=== Guest stars ===
Special guests during the first season include: Laila Ali, Ed O'Neill, Jennifer Freeman, Russell Simmons, Melanie Fiona, Estelle, Cedric the Entertainer, Shane Mosley, Elise Neal, Keri Hilson, La La Anthony, Rocsi Diaz, KJ Smith, Alec Mapa, Terry Crews, Tisha Campbell-Martin, Takhorra Taylor, Young Jeezy, Nicole Ari Parker, Jay Leno, Shaquille O'Neal, Faizon Love, Common and Trey Songz.

Season 2 guest stars include Chris Rock, Conan O'Brien, Wanda Sykes, Katie Couric, Keenen Ivory Wayans, Nadine Velazquez, Kelly Rowland, Bobby Brown, Ralph Tresvant, Tichina Arnold, James Davis, Wayne Brady, Eric Benet, Selita Ebanks, Eva Marcille, Erykah Badu, and more.

Season 3: Tamar Braxton, Mariah Carey, Regina Hall, Sanaa Lathan, George Lopez, Snoop Dogg, Jennifer Freeman, Lance Bass, Chrisette Michele, Jessica White, Fred Williamson, and more.

Season 4: Bobby Shmurda, Chris Brown, Brandy, Nia Long, Arsenio Hall, Wayne Brady, Mary J. Blige, Craig Robinson, EJ Johnson, Faith Evans, NeNe Leakes, Terry Crews, and more.

Season 5: LeToya Luckett, Nia Long, Johnny Depp, Keke Palmer and more.

== Episodes ==
After it was announced in March 2013, a twelve episode second season premiered on October 15, 2013. The following day, on October 16, 2013, the show began airing on The Comedy Channel in Australia. In April 2014, Real Husbands of Hollywood was renewed for a third season, which premiered on October 14, 2014.

The fourth season premiered on August 18, 2015. On January 21, 2016, the show was renewed for a fifth season, which premiered on October 11, 2016.

Season	Episodes	Originally released	
Season	Episodes	First released	Last released
1	10 + 1 special	January 15, 2013	March 19, 2013
2	12 + 1 special	October 15, 2013	December 17, 2013
3	12	October 14, 2014	January 27, 2015
4	14	August 18, 2015	February 9, 2016
5	10	October 11, 2016	December 13, 2016

=== Season 1 (2013) ===
No. overall	No. in season	Title	Directed by	Written by	Original release date	U.S. viewers (millions)
1	1	"Easy Bake Kevin"	Stan Lathan	Kevin Hart & Chris Spencer & Ralph Farquhar	January 15, 2013	4.14
Kevin Hart headlines an all-star cast of Hollywood husbands in this semi-scripted reality show spoof. In the opener, Kevin kicks fellow hubby Nick Cannon out of a weekly poker get-together with the remaining husbands. Invited by Nelly, Robin Thicke begins a long-standing feud with Kevin, who has developed a strong crush on Robin's wife, Paula Patton.
2	2	"Thicke and Tired"	Chris Robinson	Kevin Hart & Chris Spencer & Ralph Farquhar	January 22, 2013	2.29
In the aftermath of the poker game incident, Nelly tries to play mediator between Kevin and Robin after their one-sided feud. Meanwhile, J.B. and Boris grow suspicious after discovering that Duane's new clothing factory has questionable labor practices.
3	3	"It's Gettin' Hot in Herrre"	Chris Robinson	Buddy Lewis	January 29, 2013	2.21
In attempt to make more money, Kevin tries to get in on Nelly's investment in an exercise video, but Nelly wants only the other guys to join.
4	4	"Karma's a Mitch"	Stan Lathan	Calvin Brown Jr.	February 5, 2013	1.99
After flirting with boxer "Sugar" Shane Mosley's girlfriend, Kevin fakes an ailment to avoid getting clobbered by the champ during a charity fight.
5	5	"Hart vs. Mosley"	Stan Lathan	Calvin Brown Jr.	February 12, 2013	2.00
Kevin Hart squares off in the anticipated charity fight with professional boxer "Sugar" Shane Mosley.
6	6	"Auf Wiedersehen, Mitches"	Stan Lathan	Wayne Stamps	February 19, 2013	2.05
Kevin tries to start a music career and upsets one of the husbands, and Duane's latest scheme causes Boris to run into an ex -- and into trouble.
7	7	"Trick'd"	Stan Lathan	Robin Thede	February 26, 2013	1.85
J.B. gets a spot on a hidden-camera prank show, and Kevin receives some unexpected news from a heartless friend with benefits.
8	8	"Hollyhood Scuffle"	Chris Robinson	Prescott Tolk	March 5, 2013	1.82
Kevin writes a tell-all book about the other husbands and his own ex-wife, but he doesn't exactly tell the complete truth.
9	9	"Blackstabbers"	Chris Robinson	Calvin Brown Jr.	March 12, 2013	1.73
A mysterious blackmailer threatens to reveal incriminating "boys' night out" photos unless the guys perform a series of outrageous stunts.
10	10	"Retreat from Couples"	Stan Lathan	Wayne Stamps	March 19, 2013	2.15
In the first season finale, it's a double date night for Boris and Duane with their wives, and Kevin's special "double" date night with a pair of twins gets interrupted by Nick.
--	--	"The Reunion Special"	Stan Lathan	Wayne Stamps	May 28, 2013	1.67
Kevin and the guys revisit the dramas from Season 1.

=== Season 2 (2013) ===
No. overall	No. in season	Title	Directed by	Written by	Original release date	U.S. viewers (millions)
11	1	"Fund Raising Hell"	Stan Lathan	Michelle Listenbee Brown	October 15, 2013	3.54
In the second season premiere, Kevin shows off his upgraded celebrity digs while Wanda Sykes hijacks his new home for a star-studded fundraiser.
12	2	"Hell of a Fund Raiser"	Stan Lathan	Michelle Listenbee Brown	October 15, 2013	3.54
Wanda's fundraiser at Kevin's house continues, as Nick's donated Smart Car is auctioned off by J.B. Kevin impulsively lands the winning bid on the car (with a little help from Khloé Kardashian and Kris Jenner). Meanwhile, Kevin discovers that Selita Ebanks has left her cellphone behind, which Kevin decides to use to his advantage.
13	3	"Frauditions"	Stan Lathan	Robin Thede	October 22, 2013	1.69
Kevin decides to hold a series of fraudulent auditions for a non-existent movie in hopes of meeting an actress worthy of his rising stardom. Meanwhile, Trina convinces Boris to star in a musical stage play with Kelly Rowland as his co-star.
14	4	"Tisha & Duane"	Chris Robinson	Wayne Stamps	October 29, 2013	1.44
Duane and his wife, Tisha, are thrilled to attend a table read for a proposed television series named after them for Nick's network. The last laugh is on Duane as he performs poorly with test audience, prompting Nick to offer Kevin the role as his replacement. Meanwhile, Nelly reluctantly agrees to work with Eric Benét to help Bobby Brown stage a comeback record.
15	5	"Rock, Paper, Stealers"	Stan Lathan	Chris Spencer	November 5, 2013	1.73
Chris Rock is in town and Kevin invites him to Oliver's comedy routine. But Kevin learns that he has a propensity for shoplifting.
16	6	"Hook, Lie & Sink Her"	Chris Robinson	Prescott Tolk	November 12, 2013	1.52
Looking for love, Kevin joins a celebrity online dating service and manages to win a date with actress Nadine Velazquez. Her aggressive tactics become too much for Kevin to handle. Meanwhile, J.B. and Faizon Love have a physical grudge match.
17	7	"Outdated"	Stan Lathan	Buddy Lewis	November 19, 2013	1.46
Kevin appears on Wayne Brady's late night talk show in efforts to win Selita Ebanks' heart. Elsewhere, Bobby Brown tries another shot at stardom, despite Nelly rebuking him.
18	8	"Doing the Bump"	Chris Robinson	Joey Wells & Johnny Mack	November 26, 2013	1.62
Now appearing exclusively as a couple and crowned "Kevlita" by the media, Kevin and Selita start a new relationship/ The buzz generates a lot of hype especially once it is revealed that Selita is pregnant. Meanwhile, Boris must prepare for the stage play despite the fact that he cannot sing. Duane learns of Selita's peculiar pregnancy.
19	9	"Scattered Shower"	Stan Lathan	Ralph Farquhar & Chris Spencer	December 3, 2013	1.65
Tisha and Nicole reluctantly join forces with Bridgette, Eva Marcille and Nadine Velazquez to plan a baby shower for the expecting Selita.
20	10	"Storm Showers"	Stan Lathan	Ralph Farquhar & Chris Spencer	December 10, 2013	1.65
A red carpet kicks off the events of Kevin and Selita's baby shower during a television special with questionable, bad behavior from all involved.
21	11	"The Bump Stops Here"	Chris Robinson	Wayne Stamps	December 17, 2013	1.40
Duane arranges a public appearance sponsored by Gymboree for Kevin and Selita's baby bump promotional tour. He soon learns that Selita's "baby bump" was fake and used as a scheme to get back at him. Kevin, Duane and Selita conspire to keep the news under wraps of the public finding out. Meanwhile, Trina tries to get Kevin to host the Oscars.
22	12	"The Harter They Fall"	Chris Robinson	Michelle Listenbee Brown	December 17, 2013	1.38
After the debacle surrounding the Kevlita baby bump, Selita agrees to go candid with Katie Couric in order to win back her image. Things don't go so smoothly for Kevin as he tries to redeem himself with little success.
--	--	"Season 2 Reunion"	Stan Lathan	Ralph Farquhar & Chris Spencer & Michelle Listenbee Brown & Wayne Stamps	October 7, 2014	0.80
The cast reflect on Season 2 dramas.

=== Season 3 (2014–15) ===
No. overall	No. in season	Title	Original release date	U.S. viewers (millions)
23–24	1–2	"Falling Legend"	October 14, 2014	2.54
After last season's finale, Season 3 was picked up to where it was later revealed that Kevin fell off the ledge and suffers from amnesia. Also, Kevin's roasted by the guys; Nick enters politics; Trina and Bridgette's new boyfriends are Kevin's old frenemies.
25	3	"No New Friends"	October 21, 2014	1.04
Kevin finds new friends to replace Nick, Boris, Duane, and Nelly after the ledge incident; Duane sees monetary gain in Boris' spiritual quest.
26	4	"Don't Vote for Nick"	October 28, 2014	0.85
Kevin disrupts Nick's press conference; Trina and Wayne are tested by scheduling conflicts.
27	5	"A Blurred 47 1/2 Hours"	November 4, 2014	0.97
The shooting of 47 and 1/2 Hours. Kevin might be replaced on the set by his comic rival Mike Epps; Kevin becomes mocked by an Internet star and Kevin fumbles in a scene. Regina Hall guest stars.
28	6	"Rolling With My Roomie"	November 11, 2014	0.83
Regina Hall recovers at Kevin's; Nick hires a PI for campaign opposition research.
29	7	"Bad Sport"	November 18, 2014	0.81
Kevin's son plays baseball, with Nelly's help; Duane revamps Boris' message.
30	8	"Black Is The Same Old Black"	November 25, 2014	0.94
Tisha is arrested on a warrant, and all the girls protest against it.
31	9	"The Fight for Duane"	January 6, 2015	0.96
Duane moves in with Kevin; Nelly writes a song for Bridgette.
32	10	"Model Behavior"	January 13, 2015	1.03
Jessica White takes Kevin on a wild night
33	11	"Vote for Kidney"	January 20, 2015	N/A
Nick needs a new kidney; "Falling Legend" and "47 1/2 Hours" have a premiere dual event as Kevin squares off against Spoken Reasons.
34	12	"One in a Bazillion"	January 27, 2015	0.99
Boris has a charity event; Kevin schemes to get out of donating his kidney. Guest stars Bobby Brown and Jennifer Freeman.

=== Season 4 (2015–16) ===
No. overall	No. in season	Title	Original release date	U.S. viewers (millions)
35	1	"Suck My Trick"	August 18, 2015	1.16
In the Season 4 premiere, picking up from the Season 3 finale, Kevin is kidnapped by Arsenio Hall. He is also tricked by the guys into thinking that Nick is dead after he fails to give up his kidney.
36	2	"When Kevin Met Salli"	August 25, 2015	0.87
Kevin runs into Salli Richardson and invites her to the poker game; Salli's husband, Dondré Whitfield challenges Kevin to a joke-off for a permanent spot at the poker table.
37	3	"Hart Medication: Part 1"	September 1, 2015	0.89
Kevin accidentally takes drug-laden candies from rapper Bobby Shmurda; Trina and the guys do an intervention to send Kevin to rehab.
38	4	"Hart Medication: Part 2"	September 8, 2015	0.83
Kevin goes to rehab and meets Nia Long, who also checks in for her issues. Chris Brown hosts the event.
39	5	"Cabin Pressure"	September 15, 2015	0.88
The guys embark on an annual pilgrimage to the NBA All-Star Weekend. While along the way, they encounter travel problems, crazed fans, and Kevin encounters Regina Hall and Nadine Velazquez.
40	6	"The Great American Zero"	September 22, 2015	0.77
Kevin meets with Paramount President, Doug Howard to help put his dream into development for his next vehicle.
41	7	"Kevin Davis Jr."	September 29, 2015	0.72
Kevin is offered the lead in a biopic role that takes his career to a new level.
42	8	"Broad Talk"	October 6, 2015	0.80
The Real Housewives and girlfriends must audition for a chick chat show.
43	9	"Walk of Shame"	January 5, 2016	0.75
Kevin and Nick compete for the last star on the Hollywood Walk of Fame.
44	10	"Bazillion Dollar Arm"	January 12, 2016	0.58
Duane gets Kevin to babysit his new client, Camilo Campaneris, a Cuban baseball pitching phenom.
45	11	"Don't Cross That Bridgette"	January 19, 2016	0.69
Kevin agrees to give his life-rights to Bridgette when she gets her own reality show
46	12	"Claire and Present Danger"	January 26, 2016	0.67
Kevin flirts with a "cougar", who surprisingly returns his attention.
47	13	"Trina Sister"	February 2, 2016	0.59
Kevin tries to hook up with Trina's sister
48	14	"Easy as 1-2-3"	February 9, 2016	0.53
Craig Robinson visit the penthouse and stir up trouble with Kevin

=== Season 5 (2016) ===
No. overall	No. in season	Title	Original release date	U.S. viewers (millions)
49	1	"Keep Coming Back"	October 11, 2016	0.65
In the fifth-season premiere, Robin Thicke is back and wants Kevin to be his sponsor; Nia Long reprises her role as a sex addict and continues to pursue Kevin; J.B's aunt moves into Kevin's neighborhood.
50	2	"Baaack to School"	October 18, 2016	0.67
Kevin goes back to high school to get his degree. Trina and Wayne compete in the game of Let's Make a Deal and Wayne pops the big question.
51	3	"Fifty Shades of Brown"	October 25, 2016	0.59
LeToya Luckett tries to make Kevin the face for her skin-cafe/make-up line. The guys compete to be the next James Bond. Boris goes bald.
52	4	"The Suitor"	November 1, 2016	0.75
Kevin dates a young actress Keke Palmer.
53	5	"Kevin and Nick are Wack"	November 8, 2016	0.57
Kevin and Nick compete against each other in a rap war; Jackie and Bridgette appear on a game show called "Spouse Smarts".
54	6	"Hart in the Hood"	November 22, 2016	0.61
Kevin moves back in the hood to find his funny mojo; Nelly and the rest of the guys becomes interrogated by some "men in black". Tyga guest stars.
55	7	"Raising a Negro in the Sun"	November 29, 2016	0.47
Kevin trains to audition for Broadway; and Nelly owes his mentor Luggy.
56	8	"Everyday I'm Hustlin'"	December 6, 2016	0.49
Kevin searches for his limited-edition sneakers to give his son for his birthday. While doing so he encounters a ghost from his past.
57	9	"#Hollywoodtooblack Part 1"	December 13, 2016	0.62
The guys begin to be the subject of the controversy when they are nominated for the Oscars for a slave movie.
58	10	"#Hollywoodtooblack Part 2"	December 13, 2016	0.68
The guys become torn about whether to support the boycott of the awards show.

== Revival ==
On July 29, 2021, it was announced that BET+ has ordered a six-episode limited series revival and Kevin Hart, Duane Martin, Boris Kodjoe, Nick Cannon, J. B. Smoove, Robin Thicke, Nelly, Cynthia McWilliams, and Jackie Long are all set to return as well as Erica Ash. In 2022, the revival was revealed under the title Real Husbands of Hollywood: More Kevin, More Problems, and premiered on February 10, 2022. In addition to the returning cast, the revival introduces new additions Michele Weaver and former pundit Angela Rye.

== Reception ==
The show has received positive reviews from critics. Entertainment Weekly ranked the show as No. 1 in their "The Must List: The Top 10 Things We Love This Week", writing, "Step aside, Housewives! Our new favorite divas are the men who take the spotlight in star/exec producer Kevin Hart's uproariously funny reality TV spoof."

== Accolades ==
Year	Association	Category	Recipient(s)	Result	Ref.
2014	NAACP Image Awards	Outstanding Comedy Series	Real Husbands of Hollywood	Won	
2014	NAACP Image Awards	Outstanding Actor in a Comedy Series	Kevin Hart	Won	
2014	NAACP Image Awards	Outstanding Supporting Actor in a Comedy Series	Boris Kodjoe	Nominated	
2014	NAACP Image Awards	Outstanding Supporting Actor in a Comedy Series	J. B. Smoove	Nominated	
2014	NAACP Image Awards	Outstanding Supporting Actor in a Comedy Series	Nick Cannon	Nominated	
2014	NAACP Image Awards	Outstanding Writing in a Comedy Series	Ralph Farquhar, Chris Spencer (Episode: "Rock, Paper, Stealers")	Nominated	
2014	NAACP Image Awards	Outstanding Directing in a Comedy Series	Stan Lathan (Episode: "Rock, Paper, Stealers")	Nominated	
2015	NAACP Image Award	Outstanding Comedy Series	Real Husbands Of Hollywood	Nominated	
