= Spark (1998 film) =

- DVD cover
- Directed by: Garret Williams
- Written by: Garret Williams
- Produced by: Jim Walton; Andrew B. Hurwitz; Ruth Charney
- Starring: Terrence Howard; Nicole Ari Parker; Sandra Ellis Lafferty; Brendan Sexton III
- Distributed by: Warner Bros.
- Release dates: January 16, 1998 (Sundance); May 15, 1998 (United States)
- Running time: 103 minutes
- Country: United States
- Language: English

Spark is a 1998 psychological thriller film directed by Garret Williams in his directorial debut. It stars Terrence Howard, Nicole Ari Parker, Sandra Ellis Lafferty, and Brendan Sexton III. The film centers on a Black couple who become marooned in a backwater desert town after their car breaks down. Williams workshopped the film at the Sundance Filmmaker Labs.

Spark had its world premiere at the 1998 Sundance Film Festival and also screened at Berlinale.

== Premise ==
Byron and Nina, a young Black couple from Chicago, are driving a BMW en route to Los Angeles, where Nina will be attending college. They are driving through a desert when they experience a car breakdown after accidentally hitting a dog. Mooney, a sullen teenager and son of a local mechanic, befriends the couple and tows them to a small town where they are charged $500 for repairs. When the BMW dies again, Byron and Nina are forced to stay overnight in a motel, but the situation grows increasingly grim as Byron starts spending more time with Mooney, whose true colors start to reveal a disturbing town story.

== Cast ==
- Terrence Howard as Byron
- Nicole Ari Parker as Nina
- Sandra Ellis Lafferty as Deb
- Brendan Sexton III as Mooney
- Timothy McNeil as Stuart
- Tom Gilroy as Jack
- George Gerdes as Earl
- Dewey Weber as Tobey
- William Prael as Deputy
- William Bell as Otis

== Release ==
Spark premiered at the 1998 Sundance Film Festival in the American Spectrum section. It also screened at Berlinale in February 1998. At the 1998 Urbanworld Film Festival, the film was awarded the prize for Best Director for Garret Williams.

Spark was released on DVD by Warner Bros. as part of the American Black Film Festival series on May 15, 2007.
