= The Boris & Nicole Show =

- Genre: Talk show
- Created by: Boris Kodjoe; Nicole Ari Parker
- Presented by: Boris Kodjoe; Nicole Ari Parker
- Country of origin: United States
- Original language: English
- No. of seasons: 1
- No. of episodes: 20

Production
- Executive producers: Ianthe Jones; Boris Kodjoe; Nicole Ari Parker
- Camera setup: Multi-camera
- Running time: 43 minutes

Original release
- Network: Syndication
- Release: July 6 – July 31, 2015

The Boris & Nicole Show is an American syndicated entertainment talk show created and hosted by Boris Kodjoe and Nicole Ari Parker. The series premiered on July 6, 2015, and received a four-week test run.
