= Voyage to India =

2002 studio album by India Arie

Studio album by India Arie
- Released: September 24, 2002
- Recorded: 2001–2002
- Genre: R&B
- Label: Motown
- Producer: India Arie; Blue Miller; Paul Morton Jr.; Andrew Ramsey; Shannon Sanders

India Arie chronology
Acoustic Soul (2001)	Voyage to India (2002)	Testimony: Vol. 1, Life & Relationship (2006)

Singles from Voyage to India
- 1. "Little Things" Released: September 10, 2002; 2. "Can I Walk with You" Released: 2003; 3. "The Truth" Released: 2003; 4. "Get It Together" Released: 2003

Voyage to India is the second studio album by American singer India Arie, released on September 24, 2002, by Motown. The album is titled after a track by Arie's idol Stevie Wonder from his 1979 album Journey Through "The Secret Life of Plants".

The album debuted at number six on the Billboard 200 and at number one on the Top R&B/Hip-Hop Albums chart, selling 109,000 copies in its first week. It was certified platinum by the Recording Industry Association of America (RIAA) on August 4, 2006. At the 2003 Grammy Awards, it won Best R&B Album, and the single "Little Things" won Best Urban/Alternative Performance. The song "Get It Together" was featured on many film soundtracks, including Brown Sugar (2002) and Shark Tale (2004).

== Critical reception ==
Professional ratings
Aggregate scores
Source	Rating
Metacritic	65/100
Review scores
Source	Rating
AllMusic	4.5/5 stars
Billboard	Positive
Blender	3/5 stars
E! Online	B+
Entertainment Weekly	B
Mojo	4/5 stars
Q	2/5 stars
Rolling Stone	3/5 stars
Spin	6/10
Uncut	1/5 stars

Voyage to India received generally positive reviews from music critics. At Metacritic, which assigns a normalized rating out of 100 to reviews from mainstream publications, the album received an average score of 65, based on 15 reviews. John Bush of AllMusic said that Arie had "much to prove" after her successful debut, especially due to the notable trend of other neo soul artists, such as D'Angelo, Erykah Badu, and Macy Gray, faltering with their second albums. Bush, however, found Voyage to India a "beautiful surprise" as it "easily equals her debut, boasting better vocal performances but also better songwriting and accompanying production."

== Track listing ==
No.	Title	Writer(s)	Producer(s)	Length
1.	"Growth"	India Simpson	India Arie	1:00
2.	"Little Things"	David James Wolinski, Andre Fischer, Simpson, Shannon Sanders, Anthony Roberson	Arie, Sanders	3:29
3.	"Talk to Her"	Simpson, Sanders, Roberson, Andrew Ramsey, Algebra Blessett	Sanders, Ramsey	5:10
4.	"Slow Down"	Simpson, Sanders, Roberson, Ricky Quinones	Arie, Sanders, Ramsey	3:52
5.	"The Truth"	Simpson, Sanders, Roberson, Ramsey	Arie, Sanders, Ramsey	3:29
6.	"Beautiful Surprise"	Simpson	Arie	2:28
7.	"Healing"	Simpson	Arie	0:55
8.	"Get It Together"	Simpson, Sanders, Roberson, Ramsey	Arie, Sanders, Ramsey	4:54
9.	"Headed in the Right Direction"	Simpson, Blue Miller	Arie, Miller	3:29
10.	"Can I Walk with You"	Simpson, Miller	Arie, Miller	3:50
11.	"The One"	Simpson, Sanders, Roberson, Quinones	Arie, Sanders	3:21
12.	"Complicated Melody"	Simpson	Arie	3:13
13.	"Gratitude"	Simpson	Arie	1:05
14.	"Good Man"	Simpson, Sanders, Ramsey, Will Baker	Sanders, Ramsey	3:32
15.	"God Is Real"	Simpson, Sanders, Roberson, Ramsey	Arie, Sanders, Ramsey	4:36

Bonus track
No.	Title	Writer(s)	Producer(s)	Length
16.	"Interested" (Included on all pressings with the exception of the standard Australian and European releases. Appears as the first track on the bonus disc of the special edition)	Simpson, Paul Morton Jr.	Morton	4:05

UK limited edition bonus track
No.	Title	Writer(s)	Producer(s)	Length
17.	"Brown Skin" (live)	I. Arie, Shannon Sanders, Mark Batson	Batson	4:30

Target limited edition bonus tracks
No.	Title	Writer(s)	Producer(s)	Length
17.	"Butterfly"	Simpson	Arie, Batson	4:11
18.	"Christmas Song (Chestnuts on an Open Fire)" (featuring Stevie Wonder)	Mel Tormé, Bob Wells	Wonder, Terry Lewis	2:45

Special edition bonus disc
No.	Title	Writer(s)	Producer(s)	Length
2.	"Little Things" (Bedroom Rockers Remix)	Wolinski, Fischer, Simpson, Sanders, Roberson	Arie, Sanders, Bedroom Rockers	3:32
3.	"Little Things" (Corporate's Pop Remix)	Wolinski, Fischer, Simpson, Sanders, Roberson	Arie, Sanders, Brian Ressler	3:43
4.	"Butterfly" (remix)	Simpson	Arie, Batson	4:10
5.	"When Love Came In" (Lathun Grady featuring India Arie)	Grady, Batson	Batson	3:59
6.	"Eyes of the Heart (Radio's Song)" (radio edit)	James Horner, Simpson, Jimmy Jam and Terry Lewis, "Big Jim" Wright, Obataiye Samuel	Jimmy Jam and Terry Lewis, "Big Jim" Wright	4:45
7.	"Christmas Song (Chestnuts Roasting on an Open Fire)" (featuring Stevie Wonder)	Tormé, Wells	Wonder, Lewis	2:45

Sample credits

- "Little Things" contains an interpolation of "Hollywood" by Rufus.

== Personnel ==
- India Arie — vocals, guitar
- Brent Barrett — electric guitar
- Algebra Blesset — backing vocals
- John Catchings — cello
- David Davidson — violin
- Steve Grossman — percussion
- Tony Harrell — keyboards
- Tony Tony HarrellHarrington — backing vocals
- Kerisha Hicks — backing vocals
- Avery Johnson — bass
- Doug Kahan — bass
- Paige Martin — backing vocals
- Terry McMillan — percussion
- Blue Miller — backing vocals, acoustic guitar
- Musiq — backing vocals
- Ricky Quinones — guitar
- Andrew Ramsey — guitar
- Dave Ramsey — guitar
- Forrest Robinson — drums
- Bryant Russell — bass
- Shannon Sanders — keyboards, percussion
- Khari Simmons — bass
- Joyce Simpson — vocals
- Laurneá Wilkerson — backing vocals
- John Willis — electric guitar
- Obataiye Samuel — songwriter

== Charts ==
=== Weekly charts ===
Weekly chart performance for Voyage to India
Chart (2002)	Peak position
Australian Albums (ARIA)	67
Canadian Albums (Nielsen SoundScan)	12
Canadian R&B Albums (Nielsen SoundScan)	4
Dutch Albums (Album Top 100)	47
French Albums (SNEP)	123
German Albums (Offizielle Top 100)	90
Italian Albums (FIMI)	47
Swedish Albums (Sverigetopplistan)	37
Swiss Albums (Schweizer Hitparade)	53
UK Albums (OCC)	82
UK R&B Albums (OCC)	13
US Billboard 200	6
US Top R&B/Hip-Hop Albums (Billboard)	1

=== Year-end charts ===
2002 year-end chart performance for Voyage to India
Chart (2002)	Position
Canadian R&B Albums (Nielsen SoundScan)	45
US Billboard 200	190
US Top R&B/Hip-Hop Albums (Billboard)	83

2003 year-end chart performance for Voyage to India
Chart (2003)	Position
US Billboard 200	189
US Top R&B/Hip-Hop Albums (Billboard)	66

== Certifications ==
Certifications for Voyage to India
Region	Certification	Certified units/sales
Canada (Music Canada)	Gold	50,000^{^}
United States (RIAA)	Platinum	974,000
^{^} Shipments figures based on certification alone.
