= Loving Jezebel =

- Theatrical release poster
- Directed by: Kwyn Bader
- Written by: Kwyn Bader
- Produced by: David Lancaster
- Starring: Hill Harper; Laurel Holloman; Nicole Ari Parker; Sandrine Holt; David Moscow; Phylicia Rashad
- Cinematography: Horacio Marquínez
- Edited by: Tom McArdle
- Music by: Tony Prendatt
- Production companies: BET; Lancaster Productions; Starz! Encore Entertainment
- Distributed by: Universal Focus
- Release dates: August 5, 1999 (Urbanworld Film Festival); October 27, 2000 (United States)
- Running time: 87 minutes
- Country: United States
- Language: English
- Box office: $72,190

Loving Jezebel is a 1999 American romantic comedy film written and directed by Kwyn Bader. The film stars Hill Harper, David Moscow, Laurel Holloman, Nicole Ari Parker, Sandrine Holt, Phylicia Rashad, Elisa Donovan and Lysa Aya Trenier. The film was released on October 27, 2000, by Universal Focus. The film tells the story of a young man who reminisces about his romantic misadventures.

== Plot ==
Theodorus Melville feels he is unlucky in love because he is drawn to other men’s girlfriends. It is revealed that he doesn’t seek out other men's women so much as they are drawn to him because of qualities they can’t find in their boyfriends, such as sensitivity, tenderness, and a willing ear. Theodorus recounts his lifelong dilemma to find love, detailing his many relationships.

Theodorus comes to a realization about the true nature of the women whose attentions have defined him: "One night I had a dream that they all came to visit me and I asked them what they needed and each one whispered the same thing in my ear. 'I needed you to love the parts of me that nobody else did.' And I loved them so much they healed and then didn't need me anymore. The only one whose whisper was inaudible, whose message I could never understand, was Nikki Noodleman, whose motives remain forever a mystery. Maybe if I had known her, my life would have turned out better. None loved me back until Samantha. Her kiss was the one I'd longed for in pre-school and her touch revealed that these women were the beacons of all that was worth knowing in the universe. History called them Jezebel but I called them love."

== Cast ==
- Hill Harper as Theodorus Melville
  - Justin Pierre Edmund as Little Theodorus Melville
- David Moscow as Gabe Parks
- Laurel Holloman as Samantha
- Nicole Ari Parker as Frances
- Sandrine Holt as Mona
- Lysa Aya Trenier as June
- Andre B. Blake as Necco
- Jean-Christophe Emo as Francois
- Lawrence Gilliard, Jr. as Walter
- John Doman as Pop Melville
- Phylicia Rashad as Alice Melville
- Elisa Donovan as Salli
- Heather Gottlieb as Nina Clarise
- Diandra Newlin as Nikki Noodleman

== Production ==
The screenplay for the film was written by writer-director Kwyn Bader in his New York apartment on 86th Street and Broadway. The film’s title is inspired by the Sade song "Jezebel", which Bader was playing the night he started typing the screenplay. Bader was particularly inspired by the lines, "Jezebel wasn't born with a silver spoon in her mouth/She probably had less than every one of us/But when she knew how to walk she knew/How to bring the house down".

With Nicole Ari Parker as the first actor attached to the script and David Lancaster taking on the role of producer, rights to the screenplay were acquired in 1998 by Starz! Encore at the International Film Financing Conference (IFFCON) in San Francisco where the screenplay had been selected for inclusion as one of the best independent screenplays in the United States that year.

The film was shot on location in New York City.

== Reception ==
On the review aggregator website Rotten Tomatoes, 33% of 27 critics' reviews are positive. The website's consensus reads: "The script is cliched and badly written. The female characters aren't believable, and the movie is not funny." Metacritic, which uses a weighted average, assigned the film a score of 33 out of 100, based on 12 critics, indicating "generally unfavorable" reviews.

Critic Elvis Mitchell of The New York Times gave a positive review, writing, "It's hard to dislike a romantic comedy that's infatuated with the concept of love." Mitchell added the film "becomes a good-natured boys' version of She's Gotta Have It, Spike Lee's first feature. Like that film, this one feels as if it comes out of a world close to the director's heart, with its biracial hero stumbling into coupling with women of all races and refusing to make a big deal of any of this, a totally modern gesture in today's dreamy Manhattan, where anything is possible."

Roger Ebert wrote that the "movie is not quite what you'd expect. Within its romantic comedy we find a character who is articulate and a little poignant". However, he critiqued how the female characters in the film were thinly sketched.

Loving Jezebel won the Audience Award for Best Feature Film at the 1999 South by Southwest Film Festival in Austin, Texas.
