= Adrian Miller =

American culinary historian

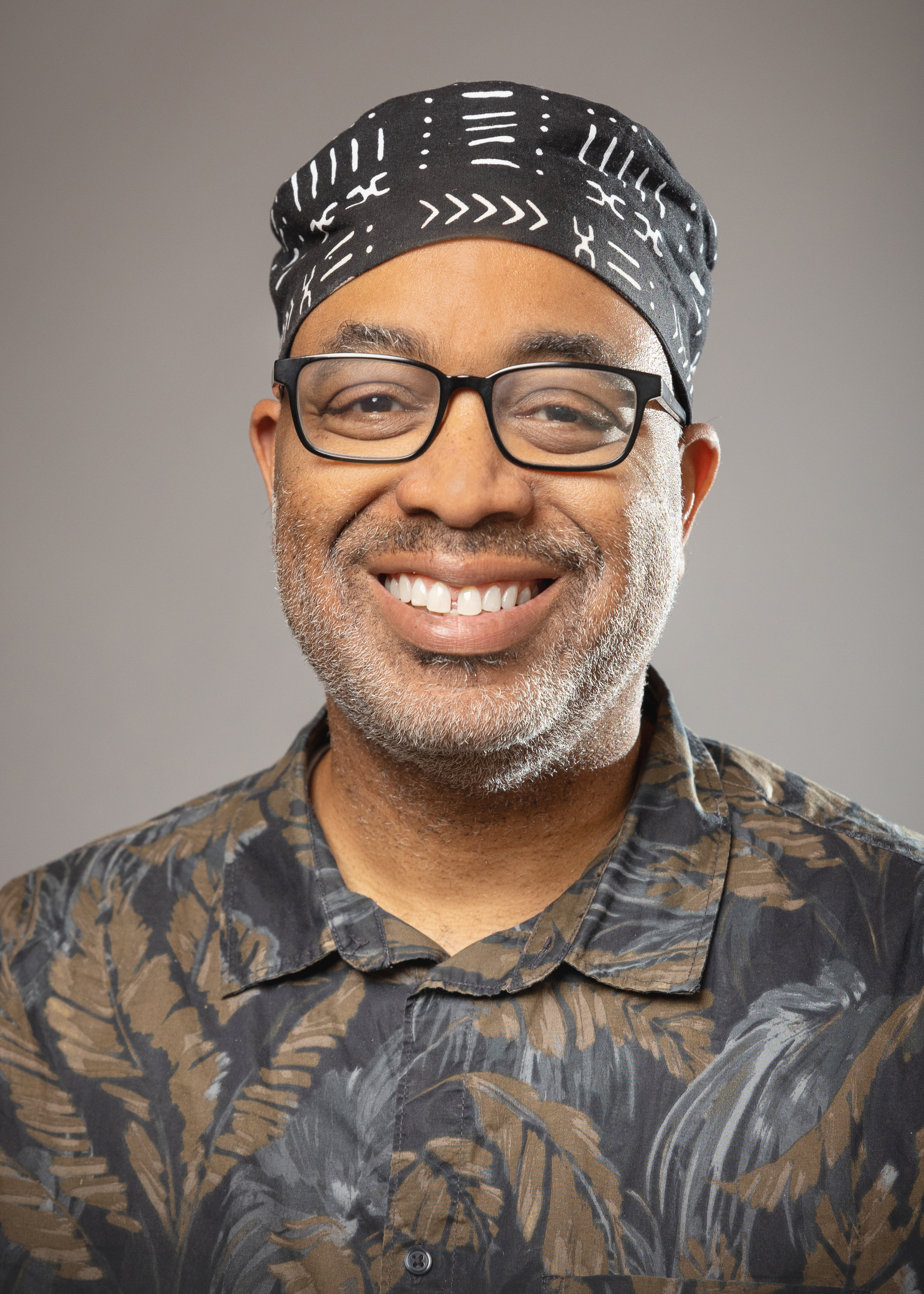
- Miller at the 2014 National Book Festival in Washington, DC
- Education: Smoky Hill High School; Stanford University; Georgetown University Law School
- Occupations: Professional speaker, author, culinary historian, policy advisor
- Notable work: Soul Food; The President's Kitchen Cabinet
- Awards: James Beard Foundation Book Award for Reference and Scholarship
- Website: adrianemiller.com

Adrian Miller is an American author and former attorney and policy analyst. His books have twice won the James Beard Foundation Book Award for Reference and Scholarship: Soul Food in 2014 and Black Smoke in 2022. He is also the author of The President's Kitchen Cabinet, which was nominated for a 2018 NAACP Image Award for Outstanding Literary Work – Nonfiction. He also served as a White House advisor to U.S. president Bill Clinton.

== Early life and education ==
After graduating from Smoky Hill High School in Aurora, Colorado, Miller attended Stanford University, where he was resident counselor to David O. Sacks. Miller graduated on April 4, 1991, with a bachelor's degree in international relations. He next attended Georgetown University Law School, where he earned a J.D. in 1995.

== Career ==
Miller served as a special assistant to the president in the Clinton Administration and deputy director of the President's Initiative for One America. He resigned after George W. Bush took office and between jobs, Miller took an interest in food writing, inspired by John Egerton's book Southern Food: At Home, on the Road, in History. The interest developed into a book, Soul Food: The Surprising Story of an American Cuisine, One Plate at a Time, which he published with the University of North Carolina Press in 2013 and which won the 2014 James Beard Foundation Book Award for Reference and Scholarship. It was also named a non-fiction honor book by the Black Caucus of the American Library Association. Soul Food combines archival research with Miller's own travels (visiting 150 restaurants in 35 cities) to survey the way the food culture of the Southern United States has been "reestablished and reinterpreted" as African-Americans moved to other parts of the country, using the lens of diaspora to interpret this evolution.

While researching his first book, Miller particularly began collecting historical traces of African-Americans who had staffed the White House kitchen. This became the subject of his second book, The President's Kitchen Cabinet: The Story of the African Americans Who Have Fed Our First Families, from the Washingtons to the Obamas, published in 2017 (again with the University of North Carolina Press). In the course of research, Miller was able to identify the names of 150 African-Americans who cooked in the White House, though there were many more who remain unnamed. The book earned a nomination for the 2018 NAACP Image Award for Outstanding Literary Work, Nonfiction.

Miller is a member of the board of the Southern Foodways Alliance and a certified barbecue competition judge. His third book, published in 2021, is Black Smoke: African Americans and the United States of Barbecue. Black Smoke traces the history of Black barbecuers, pitmasters, and restaurateurs and their role in barbecue culture. It also includes 22 recipes. It won the 2022 James Beard Foundation Award for a book in the category of Reference, History, and Scholarship.

Meanwhile, Miller also served as policy analyst for Colorado governor Bill Ritter. He is the executive director for the Colorado Council of Churches.

== Personal life ==
Miller lives in Denver, Colorado.
