= Paul Butler (professor) =

American lawyer, prosecutor and law professor

- Butler at Politics and Prose in 2026
- Born: Paul Delano Butler; January 15, 1961 (age 65); Chicago, Illinois, U.S.
- Education: Yale University (BA); Harvard University (JD)
- Scientific career
- Fields: Criminal law
- Workplaces: Georgetown University Law Center

Paul Delano Butler (born January 15, 1961) is an American lawyer, former prosecutor, and current law professor of Georgetown University Law Center. He is a leading criminal law scholar, particularly in the area of race and jury nullification.

== Early life and education ==
Butler was born in Chicago, Illinois, where he attended St. Ignatius College Preparatory School. He received his B.A. degree cum laude from Yale University and his J.D. degree from Harvard Law School.

== Legal career ==
Butler clerked for the Honorable Mary Johnson Lowe of the U.S. District Court for the Southern District of New York. He then joined the law firm of Williams & Connolly in Washington, D.C., where he specialized in white collar criminal defense and civil litigation.

Following his time in private practice, Butler served as a federal prosecutor with the U.S. Department of Justice, where his specialty was public corruption. While at the Department of Justice, Butler also served as a special assistant U.S. attorney, prosecuting drug and gun cases.

== Academic career ==
Butler is currently the Albert Brick Professor in Law at the Georgetown University Law Center, where he teaches criminal law, criminal procedure, race relations law, and critical theory.

His scholarship has been published in the Yale Law Journal, Harvard Law Review, Stanford Law Review, and UCLA Law Review. He has authored chapters in several books, written a column for the Legal Times, and published numerous op-ed articles, including in the Los Angeles Times, The Washington Post, and The Dallas Morning News. He lectures regularly for the ABA and the NAACP, and at colleges, law schools, and community organizations throughout the U.S. Butler was a regular contributor at BlackProf.com until its demise in 2009.

He was awarded the Distinguished Faculty Service Award three times by the Georgetown Law graduating class and has been a visiting professor at the University of Pennsylvania Law School. In 2003, he was elected to the American Law Institute. In 2009, his first book, Let's Get Free: A Hip-Hop Theory of Justice, was published by The New Press. His second book, Chokehold: Policing Black Men, was published by The New Press in 2017.

== Published works ==
- Let's Get Free: A Hip-Hop Theory of Justice (The New Press, 2010)
- Chokehold: Policing Black Men (The New Press, 2017)
