= Little Things (India Arie song) =

Single by India Arie

from the album Voyage to India
- Released: September 10, 2002
- Recorded: 2001
- Studio: Atlanta: Access Studios (recording), Patchwerk Studios (mixing)
- Genre: R&B; soul
- Length: 3:29
- Label: Motown
- Songwriter(s): India Arie; Shannon Sanders; Hawk Wolinski; Andre Fischer; Anthony Robertson
- Producer(s): Shannon Sanders; India Arie

India Arie singles chronology
"Brown Skin" (2001)	"Little Things" (2002)	"The Truth" (2003)

"Little Things" is the first single released by American soul and R&B singer-songwriter India Arie from her second studio album Voyage to India. In 2003, the song won a Grammy award for Best Urban/Alternative Performance; the album also won, giving Arie her first two Grammy wins. Arie wrote the song with Hawk Wolinski, Shannon Sanders, Andre Fischer and Anthony Robertson—all of them musicians associated with the band Rufus. Arie produced the song with Sanders.

Arie began performing the song in her concerts starting in August 2002, before the single was released on September 10, preceding the album release by two weeks. The single entered the Billboard charts in mid-September 2002, and in October it peaked at number 33 on the Hot R&B/Hip-Hop Songs chart, staying on the chart for 33 weeks. It peaked in November at number 89 on the Hot 100 chart. At the end of 2002, Billboard listed the "Little Things" as the 41st most-played song on "Adult R&B" radio stations in the US during 2002.

Arie said that the song was "about the lessons [she] learned last year" when she experienced difficulty balancing her career fame with her personal life. The Washington Post praised the song as a "lilting paean to... life's simple pleasures". The New York Times noticed that "Little Things" and "Slow Down" were the two "songs of self-encouragement" on Voyage to India. The BBC observed that the song was similar to "Hollywood" from the 1977 Rufus album Ask Rufus, writing "the lift is discreet and in the best taste."

== Personnel ==
- India Arie – lead and backing vocals, production
- Shannon Sanders – keyboards, production
- Ricky Quinones – guitar
- Khari Simmons – bass
- Forrest Robinson – drums
- Kerisha Hicks – backing vocals
- Tony Harrington – backing vocals
- Avery Johnson – recording engineer

== Charts ==
Chart (2002)	Peak position
U.S. Billboard Hot 100	89
U.S. Billboard Hot R&B/Hip-Hop Songs	33
UK Singles Chart	62
