= Nicole Ari Parker =

American actress (born 1970)

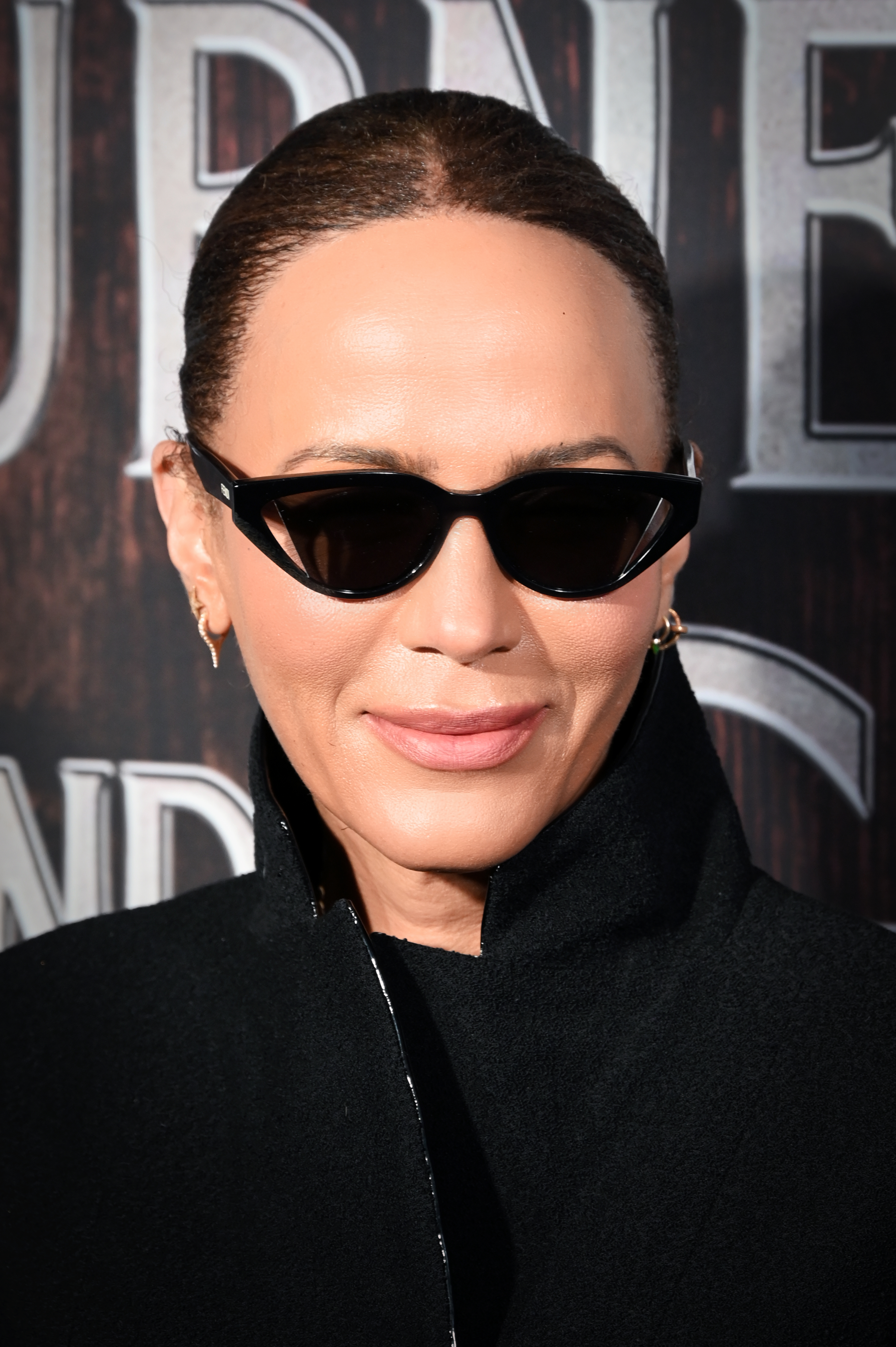
- Parker in 2026
- Born: October 7, 1970 (age 56); Baltimore, Maryland, U.S.
- Education: New York University (BFA)
- Occupations: Actress, model
- Years active: 1993–present
- Spouses: Joseph Falasca (m. 2001; ann. 2001); Boris Kodjoe (m. 2005)
- Children: 2

Nicole Ari Parker Kodjoe (born October 7, 1970) is an American actress and model. She made her screen debut with a leading role in the critically acclaimed independent film The Incredibly True Adventure of Two Girls in Love (1995) and went on to appear in Boogie Nights (1997), directed by Paul Thomas Anderson.

Parker has starred in a number of movies, including Blue Streak (1999), Remember the Titans (2000), Brown Sugar (2002), Welcome Home Roscoe Jenkins (2008), Black Dynamite (2009), and Almost Christmas (2016). On television, Parker played the leading role of attorney Teri Joseph (later Carter) in the Showtime drama series Soul Food (2000–04), for which she received five NAACP Image Award for Outstanding Actress in a Drama Series nominations. She also starred in the short-lived UPN romantic comedy Second Time Around (2004–05) and the ABC drama Time After Time (2017). In 2017, she joined the cast of Fox's prime-time soap opera Empire playing Giselle Barker. In 2021, she began starring as Lisa Todd Wexley in the HBO Max comedy-drama series, And Just Like That....

== Early years ==
Parker was born on October 7, 1970, in Baltimore, Maryland. She is the only child of her divorced parents, health care professional Susan Parker and dentist Donald Parker. After briefly attending a Montessori school, Parker entered Roland Park Country School, where she stayed through high school. At the age of 17, she won Best Actress in the state of Maryland's high school theater competition. She became a member of The Washington Ballet Company before earning an acting degree in 1993 from New York University's Tisch School of the Arts.

== Career ==
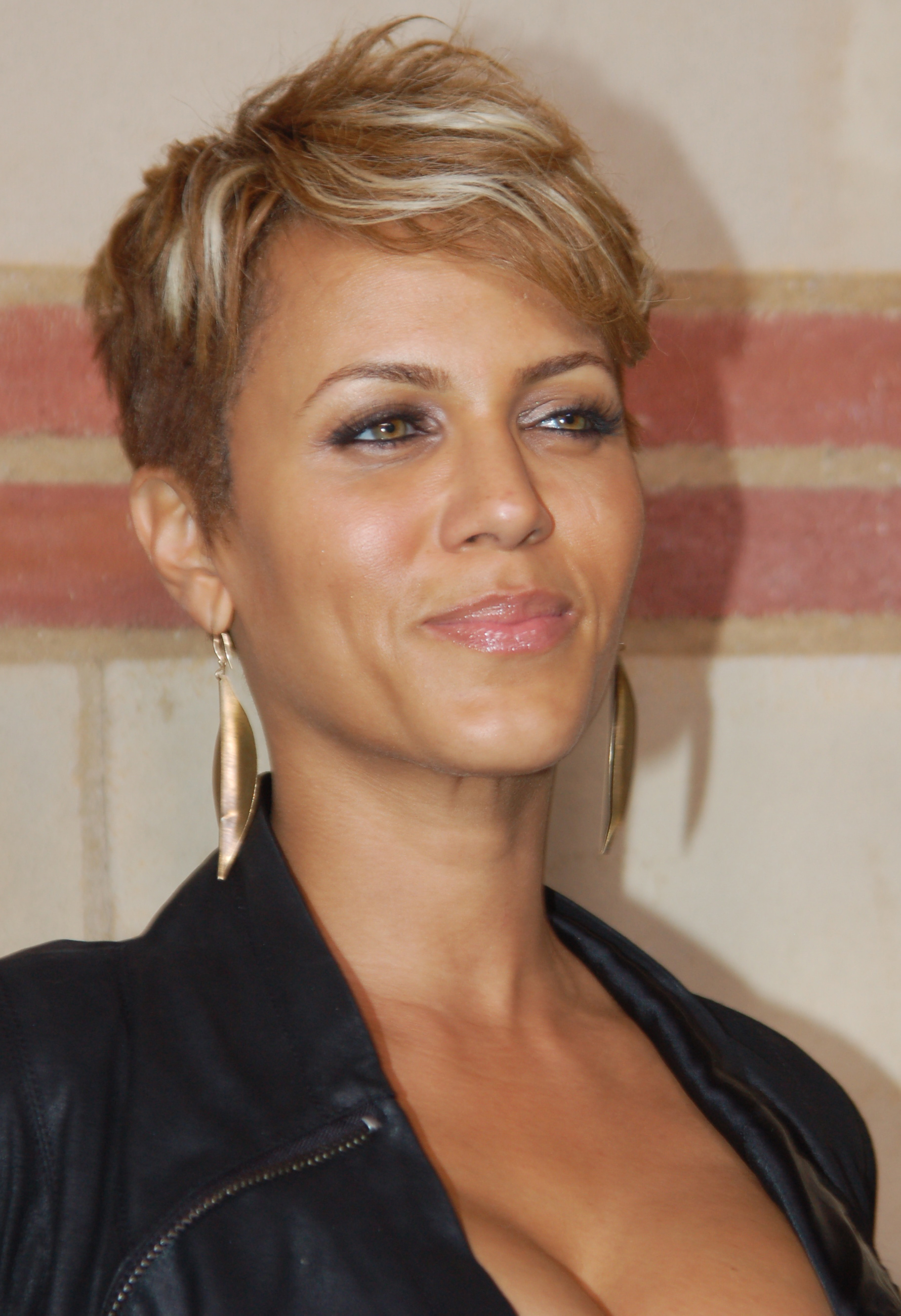
Parker at a performance of The Hot Chocolate Nutcracker in December 2010

Parker made her screen debut playing secondary role in the 1993 made-for-television movie Other Women's Children starring Melanie Mayron. Two years later she went to star in the critically acclaimed independent comedy-drama film, The Incredibly True Adventure of Two Girls in Love. Also that year, she starred in the Divas, a made-for-television musical drama film about female singing group. In 1997, she starred in the comedy-drama film Boogie Nights written and directed by Paul Thomas Anderson. The following year, she appeared in the television film Exiled: A Law & Order Movie. Her other film credits include The End of Violence (1997), Spark (1998), the 1999 Sundance Film Festival winner The Adventures of Sebastian Cole (1998), 200 Cigarettes (1999), Loving Jezebel (1999), A Map of the World (1999) and Blue Streak (1999).

In 2000, Parker played the leading role in the drama film Dancing in September and starred opposite Denzel Washington in the biographical film Remember the Titans, receiving NAACP Image Award for Outstanding Supporting Actress in a Motion Picture nomination. Also that year, she began starring as Teri Joseph in the Showtime drama series, Soul Food. The series was an adaptation of George Tillman's 1997 drama film, Soul Food, and the role of Teri played Vanessa Williams. The series ended in 2004. For her performance she received five NAACP Image Award for Outstanding Actress in a Drama Series nominations. She returned to film, starring in the 2002 romantic comedy Brown Sugar. She later appeared in King's Ransom (2005), Welcome Home Roscoe Jenkins (2008) alongside her Blue Streak co-star Martin Lawrence, Black Dynamite (2009), Imagine That (2009), and Pastor Brown (2009).

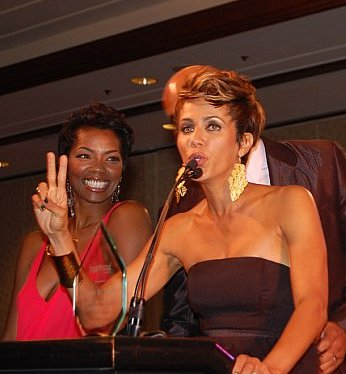
Parker with Vanessa Estelle Williams in 2011

On television, Parker starred on the short-lived UPN sitcom, Second Time Around from 2004 to 2005. In 2010, she returned to television with starring role in the ABC legal drama, The Deep End, the series was cancelled after one season. In 2012. she made her Broadway debut playing the role of Blanche DuBois in A Streetcar Named Desire. In 2013, Parker was lead actress in the NBC drama pilot Secret Lives of Husbands and Wives, and later had a recurring role on Revolution. In 2014, she starred as a series regular in the first season of the TNT crime drama Murder in the First, opposite Taye Diggs and Kathleen Robertson. In 2016, she appeared alongside Kimberly Elise and Mo'Nique in the comedy-drama film Almost Christmas. In 2017, she starred in another short-lived drama series, Time After Time.

In 2017, Parker joined the cast of Fox prime time soap opera, Empire, playing Giselle Barker in a recurring role during the fourth season. She was promoted to a series regular for the fifth season, remaining with the show through the series finale in 2020. For the 2020-21 television season, Parker had a recurring role on the NBC series, Chicago P.D, and in late 2021 began starring in the HBO Max comedy-drama series, And Just Like That... playing the role of Lisa Todd Wexley. In 2022, she also appeared in the Peacock miniseries The Best Man: The Final Chapters.

== Personal life ==
Parker is an active member of the Democratic Party. She eloped with actor Joseph Falasca in March 2001. Their marriage ended in divorce later that year. Parker married her Soul Food co-star Boris Kodjoe in Gundelfingen, Germany, on May 21, 2005. She gave birth to their first child, Sophie, on March 5, 2005. Sophie has spina bifida, which was diagnosed at birth. Parker gave birth to their son Nicolas in October 2006 in Atlanta, Georgia. The family attends the Cascade United Methodist Church when in Atlanta.

== Filmography ==
=== Film ===
| Year | Title | Role | Notes |
|---|---|---|---|
| 1993 | Other Women's Children | Marcelle | Television film |
| 1995 | The Incredibly True Adventure of Two Girls in Love | Evie Roy | |
| 1995 | Stonewall | Female Draft Officer | |
| 1995 | Divas | Stephanie | Television film |
| 1996 | Rebound: The Legend of Earl "The Goat" Manigault | Wanda | Television film |
| 1997 | The End of Violence | Ade | |
| 1997 | Boogie Nights | Becky Barnett | Florida Film Critics Circle Award for Best Cast; Nominated — Screen Actors Guild Award for Outstanding Performance by a Cast in a Motion Picture |
| 1998 | Spark | Nina | |
| 1998 | The Adventures of Sebastian Cole | Jenny | |
| 1998 | Exiled: A Law & Order Movie | Georgeanne Taylor | Television film |
| 1999 | 200 Cigarettes | Bridget | |
| 1999 | Mute Love | Mavis | |
| 1999 | Mind Prey | Weather Karkinnon | Television film |
| 1999 | Mirar Mirror | Denise Scott | Short |
| 1999 | Loving Jezebel | Frances | |
| 1999 | Harlem Aria | Clarisse | |
| 1999 | A Map of the World | Sherry | |
| 1999 | Blue Streak | Melissa Green | |
| 2000 | Dancing in September | Tomasina 'Tommy' Crawford | Nominated — Black Reel Award for Network/Cable - Best Actress |
| 2000 | Remember the Titans | Carol Boone | Nominated — NAACP Image Award for Outstanding Supporting Actress in a Motion Picture |
| 2002 | Brown Sugar | Reese Marie Wiggam Ellis | Nominated — NAACP Image Award for Outstanding Supporting Actress in a Motion Picture; Nominated — BET Award for Best Actress |
| 2005 | King's Ransom | Angela Drake | |
| 2008 | Welcome Home, Roscoe Jenkins | Lucinda Allen | |
| 2009 | Black Dynamite | Mahogany Black | |
| 2009 | Imagine That | Trish Danielson | |
| 2009 | Pastor Brown | Tonya Copeland Brown | Nominated — Black Reel Award for Outstanding Supporting Actress, TV Movie or Limited Series |
| 2011 | 35 and Ticking | Zenobia | |
| 2013 | Repentance | Sophie Sanchez | |
| 2016 | Almost Christmas | Sonya Meyers | |
| 2017 | Downsized | Ebony | Television film |
| 2018 | How It Ends | Paula Sutherland | |
| 2022 | We Are Gathered Here Today | Nancy Stone | |
| 2022 | Safe Room | Lila Jackson | |
| 2023 | A Snowy Day in Oakland | Dr. Latrice Monroe | |
| 2026 | Misty Green | Erica | |

Key
| † | Denotes films that have not yet been released |

=== Television ===
| Year | Title | Role | Notes |
|---|---|---|---|
| 1997 | Subway Stories | Sharon | Episode: "Honey-Getter" |
| 1999–2000 | Cosby | Rebecca | Recurring cast: season 4 |
| 2000 | The Wonderful World of Disney | Christine Claiborne | Episode: "The Loretta Claiborne Story" |
| 2000–2004 | Soul Food | Teri Joseph | Main cast Nominated — NAACP Image Award for Outstanding Actress in a Drama Series (2001-2005); Nominated — BET Award for Best Actress (2003) |
| 2002 | CSI: Crime Scene Investigation | Lillie Ivers | Episode: "Primum Non Nocere" |
| 2003 | The System | Linda Evans | Main cast |
| 2004 | All of Us | Traci Garrison | Episode: "Playdate" |
| 2004–2005 | Second Time Around | Ryan Muse | Main cast |
| 2010 | The Deep End | Susan Oppenheim | Main cast |
| 2013 | Revolution | Secretary Justine Allenford | Recurring cast: season 2 |
| 2013–2015 | Real Husbands of Hollywood | Herself | Recurring cast: season 1–4 |
| 2014 | Murder in the First | District Attorney Jacqueline Perez | Recurring cast: season 1 |
| 2015 | The Boris & Nicole Show | Herself/co-host | TV series |
| 2015–2016 | Rosewood | Kat Crawford | Recurring cast: season 1 |
| 2017 | Time After Time | Vanessa Anders | Main cast |
| 2017–2020 | Empire | Giselle Barker | Recurring cast: season 4, main cast: season 5–6 |
| 2018 | I'm Dying Up Here | Gloria Whitfield | Recurring cast: season 2 |
| 2018 | The Romanoffs | Cheryl Gowans | Episode: "Bright and High Circle" |
| 2019 | Lip Sync Battle | Herself | Episode: "Boris Kodjoe vs. Nicole Ari Parker" |
| 2019 | Younger | Beth | Guest star: season 6 |
| 2020–2021 | Chicago P.D. | Deputy Superintendent Samantha Miller | Recurring cast: Season 8–9 |
| 2021–2025 | And Just Like That... | Lisa Todd Wexley | Recurring cast: season 1, main cast: season 2–3 |
| 2022 | The Best Man: The Final Chapters | Xiomara Amani | Special guest star; 2 episodes |
