= The African Americans: Many Rivers to Cross =

Television documentary series

The African Americans: Many Rivers to Cross is a six-part documentary miniseries written and presented by Henry Louis Gates Jr. It aired for the first time on the Public Broadcasting Service (PBS) in the fall of 2013, beginning with episode 1, "The Black Atlantic (1500–1800)", on October 22, 8–9 p.m. ET on PBS, and every consecutive Tuesday through to episode 6, "A More Perfect Union (1968–2013)", on November 26. The companion book to the series, The African Americans: Many Rivers to Cross (SmileyBooks, 2013), was co-authored by Gates and historian Donald Yacovone. The two-DVD set of the series was released in January 2014.

The African Americans: Many Rivers to Cross chronicles the African-American experience from the origins of the transatlantic slave trade to the reelection and second inauguration of President Barack Obama. It is the first documentary series to recount this history in its entirety since the nine-part History of the Negro People aired on National Educational Television in 1965, and the one-hour documentary Black History: Lost, Stolen, or Strayed, narrated by Bill Cosby and broadcast in 1968. According to the PBS website for the series, The African Americans: Many Rivers to Cross "explores the evolution of the African-American people, as well as the multiplicity of cultural institutions, political strategies, and religious and social perspectives they developed — forging their own history, culture and society against unimaginable odds. Commencing with the origins of slavery in Africa, the series moves through five centuries of remarkable historic events right up to the present — when America is led by a black president, yet remains a nation deeply divided by race."

== Production ==
For the series, Gates collaborated with more than 30 historians to identify and select 70 of the most important and illustrative stories of the African-American experience to serve as the epic's narrative spine. Among the more notable figures Gates highlighted was the black Spanish conquistador Juan Garrido, who, in 1513, accompanied Ponce de León on his expedition into what is now the state of Florida. As a result, the airing of The African Americans: Many Rivers to Cross coincided with the 500th anniversary of the presence of persons of African descent in what is today the continental United States. Among the other prominent figures profiled in the series are: Harriet Tubman, Richard Allen, Frederick Douglass, Robert Smalls, Ida B. Wells, W. E. B. Du Bois, Booker T. Washington, Marcus Garvey, Oscar Micheaux, Rosa Parks, Martin Luther King Jr., Ruby Bridges, Charlayne Hunter-Gault, Kathleen Neal Cleaver, Maulana Karenga, Colin Powell, and many more.

In an interview with TheRoot.com (an online magazine that Gates co-founded and for which he serves as editor-in-chief), Gates described his goals for the series:

"First, to show that black culture is inextricably intertwined with American culture. There’s no America without African Americans.

"Second, to provide a tool that teachers can use to enact the conversation about race every day in the classroom. Every day’s gotta be Black History Month. Just like with citizenship, for example: A teacher doesn’t say, ‘Today I'm going to teach you how to be a citizen.’ It's taught every day.”

In a separate interview on the Tavis Smiley Show on PBS, Gates explained how personal the series is for him:

"The reason that I wanted to do this series, the first comprehensive treatment of the whole sweep of African-American history since Bill Cosby did his in 1968, and which I watched with my parents when I was 17 years old, was to provide the tools through which a teacher could incorporate African American history into the story, the grand narrative, of the founding of America, its settlement, its peopling, and its great prosperity over the last several centuries."

== Episodes ==
- Episode One: "The Black Atlantic" (1500–1800)
- Episode Two: "The Age of Slavery" (1800–1860)
- Episode Three: "Into the Fire" (1861–1896)
- Episode Four: "Making a Way Out of No Way" (1897–1940)
- Episode Five: "Rise!" (1940–1968)
- Episode Six: "A More Perfect Union" (1968–2013)

== Production team ==
A film by Kunhardt McGee Productions and Inkwell Films, in association with Ark Media, The African Americans: Many Rivers to Cross was written and presented by Henry Louis Gates Jr., who also served as an executive producer on the series with Peter Kunhardt and Dyllan McGee. The senior producer of the series was Rachel Dretzin, and Leslie Asako Gladsjo was senior story producer. Rebecca Brillhart was Supervising Producer. The following were directors/producers: Sabin Streeter (episodes 1 and 2), Jamila Wignot (episode 3 and 6), Phil Bertelsen (episodes 4 and 5), and Leslie Asako Gladsjo (episode 6). The complete production team for the series, by episode, can be found on the PBS website. The African Americans: Many Rivers to Cross is Gates's 13th documentary film.

== Critical response ==
Reviewing the series for The New Yorker, writer and theater critic Hilton Als wrote: "The story Gates tells in his thirteenth documentary film is an epic one, and details how enslaved black Africans became African-Americans.... Gates’s quest isn’t ideological; one could call the documentary a kind of 'Pilgrim’s Progress,' one in which the burdens are race and property. What becomes abundantly clear vis-à-vis Gates’s lyrical investigation is the innate genius it took for African-Americans to survive.... [T]he tapestry-like richness of the series is interwoven with many stories, many ideas, and many realities; one cannot extract a single episode as being superior to another.... Gates uses archival footage and photographs prudently, and he doesn’t depend on images to tell his story. Rather, what we listen for is the steady calm of his questioning voice: our trusted guide illustrates how black skin became property, and how the subsequent attempt to dehumanize a people began with separating the family, and taking away their names. But what slave owners couldn’t rip off or silence was the collective African-American voice, the stories people told not only to survive but so they could be remembered. Gates's magisterial series continues that tradition."

== Accolades ==
The African Americans: Many Rivers to Cross was among the winners of the 73rd annual Peabody Awards for excellence on television, radio and the Internet. It also received an NAACP Image Award for Outstanding News/Information – (Series or Special).

In recognizing the series, the Peabody Awards website states: "A long time coming, not to mention five years in the making, Gates’ history of African Americans, their trials, their triumphs and their ongoing influence on this nation, reaches back five centuries to find stories that inspire, unsettle, surprise and illuminate."

In December 2014, Gates was announced as one of 14 recipients of a 2015 Alfred I. duPont-Columbia Award for his documentary series.
