= Boris Kodjoe =

German/Austrian actor and former model (born 1973)

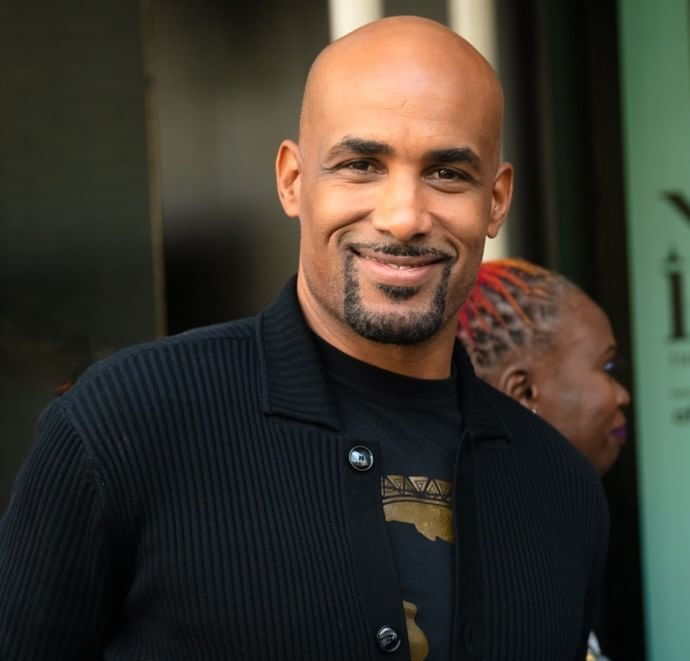
- Kodjoe in 2021
- Born: Boris Frederic Cecil Tay-Natey Ofuatey-Kodjoe; March 8, 1973 (age 53); Vienna, Austria
- Citizenship: Austria; Germany
- Education: Virginia Commonwealth University (BA)
- Occupations: Actor; producer; model
- Years active: 1994–present
- Spouse: Nicole Ari Parker (m. 2005)
- Children: 2

Boris Frederic Cecil Tay-Natey Ofuatey-Kodjoe (/ˈkoʊdʒuː/; born March 8, 1973) is an Austrian-German actor and former model, based in the United States. His breakthrough role was as sports-courier agent Damon Carter on the Showtime drama series Soul Food (2000-2004). His other notable television roles include Dr. Will Campbell on CBS's Code Black, Phil Miller on The Last Man on Earth, Robert Sullivan on Station 19, and a fictionalized version of himself on Real Husbands of Hollywood.

Kodjoe has also appeared in films such as Love & Basketball (2000), Brown Sugar (2002), Surrogates (2009), Resident Evil: Afterlife (2010) and its sequel Resident Evil: Retribution (2012), and the animated film Ferdinand (2017). He is a two-time NAACP Image Award nominee, Outstanding Supporting Actor in a Drama Series for Soul Food and Outstanding Supporting Actor in a Comedy Series for Real Husbands of Hollywood.

== Early life and education ==
Kodjoe was born in Vienna, Austria, the son of Ursula, a German psychologist of Jewish descent, and Eric Kodjoe, a Ghanaian physician. His namesake is the Russian poet and writer Boris Pasternak. Kodjoe's matrilineal great-grandmother was Jewish and was murdered in the Holocaust; his maternal grandmother survived the war in hiding.

Kodjoe's parents divorced when he was six years old, and he moved to Germany at that time. He grew up in the town of Gundelfingen, near Freiburg im Breisgau and his birthplace in Austria.

He attended Virginia Commonwealth University on a tennis scholarship and graduated with a bachelor's degree in marketing in 1996. A four-year letterman on the Rams' men's tennis team, he is currently ninth in school history with 75 career singles wins. Tied for third in doubles victories with 66, he was paired with Jonas Elmblad on 37 of them, also third all-time. His brother Patrick Kodjoe played for VCU's basketball team. A back injury ended Boris' tennis aspirations, but he was quickly signed as a model and, soon after, entered acting. In 1995, he was featured in TLC's music video for "Red Light Special".

== Career ==
Named one of the "50 Most Beautiful People in the World" by People magazine in 2002, Kodjoe is perhaps best known as one of the 7 regular cast members from the Showtime drama Soul Food, which aired from 2000 to 2004. He appeared in the 2002 film Brown Sugar and starred in the short-lived sitcom Second Time Around with his Soul Food co-star Nicole Ari Parker, whom he eventually married. He played the role of David Taylor, the wayward son of Pastor Fred Taylor, in the October 2005 film The Gospel. He performed in a play called Whatever She Wants, starring Vivica A. Fox, and made an appearance on the fifth season of Nip/Tuck. He had a supporting role in the 2009 science fiction film Surrogates. Kodjoe and Gugu Mbatha-Raw starred as a husband-and-wife secret agent team in 2010 J. J. Abrams-produced the NBC TV series Undercovers, but the show lasted less than one season. That year, he also appeared as Luther in the film Resident Evil: Afterlife. He had a guest appearance on the TV show Franklin & Bash in 2012.

From 2013 to 2016, Kodjoe starred as a fictional version of himself in the BET comedy parody series Real Husbands of Hollywood. In 2014, he was cast as a regular on the ABC primetime soap opera Members Only created by Susannah Grant, but the show never aired. In 2015, Kodjoe began a recurring guest role on Fox's The Last Man on Earth television series. Kodjoe was part of the ensemble cast for all three seasons of the CBS medical drama Code Black playing surgeon Dr. Will Campbell from 2016 to 2018.

In July 2018, Kodjoe landed a recurring role in the second season of the Grey's Anatomy spin-off series Station 19. In October, he was promoted to a series regular after his appearance in the season premiere as the new fire captain, Robert Sullivan. In "Eulogy", he is promoted to Battalion Chief.

== Personal life ==
Kodjoe married his Soul Food: The Series co-star Nicole Ari Parker on May 21, 2005, in Gundelfingen, Germany. She gave birth to their first child, Sophia, in March 2005, who was diagnosed with spina bifida at birth. Parker gave birth to the couple's second child, a boy, in October 2006. Kodjoe and his wife are members of Cascade United Methodist Church in Atlanta, Georgia. The family resides in Los Angeles, California. Parker and Kodjoe competed against one another on a February 2019 episode of Lip Sync Battle.

== Filmography ==
=== Film ===
Year	Title	Role	Notes
2000	Love & Basketball	Jason	
2002	Brown Sugar	Kelby Dawson	
2004	Doing Hard Time	Michael Mitchell	Video
2005	The Gospel	David Taylor	
2006	Madea's Family Reunion	Frankie Henderson	
2007	All About Us	Edward Brown	
2007	Alice Upside Down	Mr. Edgecombe	
2008	Starship Troopers 3: Marauder	General Dix Hauser	Video
2009	Surrogates	FBI Special Agent-in-Charge Andy Stone	
2010	The Confidant	Nigel Patterson	
2010	Resident Evil: Afterlife	Luther West	
2012	Resident Evil: Retribution	Luther West	
2013	Baggage Claim	Graham	
2013	Nurse 3D	Det. John Rogan	
2014	Addicted	Jason Reynard	
2014	Whatever She Wants	Julian	Video
2017	Ferdinand	Klaus (voice)	
2022	Safe Room	Neil Hargrove	

=== Television ===
Year	Title	Role	Notes
1998	The Steve Harvey Show	Dexter	Episode: "Every Boy Needs a Teacher"
2000	For Your Love	Terrence	Episode: "The French Lesson"
2000–04	Soul Food	Damon Carter	Main Cast
2003	Boston Public	Coach Derek Williams	Recurring Cast: Season 3
2003	Street Time	Bowman Calloway	Recurring Cast: Season 2
2003	All of Us	Marcus	Episode: "Uncle Marcus Comes to Dinner"
2004	Eve	Kevin	Episode: "Valentine's Day Reloaded"
2004–05	Second Time Around	Jackson Muse	Main Cast
2007	Crossing Jordan	Detective Elliot Chandler	Recurring Cast: Season 6
2007	Women's Murder Club	Simon Perry	Episode: "Blind Dates and Bleeding Hearts"
2007	Nip/Tuck	Elton Forrest	Episode: "Chaz Darling"
2009	Tyler Perry's House of Payne	David	Episode: "Help Wanted"
2010	Undercovers	Steven Bloom	Main Cast
2012	Franklin & Bash	Nolan Tate	Episode: "Last Dance"
2012	A Killer Among Us	Detective Joe Moran	TV movie
2013	The Real Housewives of Atlanta	Himself	Episode: "Praise the Pageant"
2013–16	Real Husbands of Hollywood	Himself	Main Cast
2014	The Chase	Himself	Episode: "Starry Eyed: Celebrity Episode"
2014	Unforgettable	Agent Francis Simms	Recurring Cast: Season 3
2015	The Last Man on Earth	Philip Stacy "Phil" Miller	Recurring Cast: Season 1-2
2015	The Boris & Nicole Show	Himself/Co-host	Main Co-host
2016	Cape Town	Sanctus Snook	Main Cast
2016–18	Code Black	Dr. Will Campbell	Recurring Cast: Season 1, Main Cast: Season 2-3
2017	Tales	Ray Vance	Episode: "Fuck the Police"
2017	Marlon	Devon	Episode: "Pilot"
2017	Downsized	Michael Sr.	TV movie
2018	House of Cards	Brett Cole	Recurring Cast: Season 6
2018–24	Station 19	Robert Sullivan	Main Cast: Season 2-7
2019	Lip Sync Battle	Himself	Episode: "Boris Kodjoe vs. Nicole Ari Parker"
2019–22	Grey's Anatomy	Robert Sullivan	Guest Cast: Season 15 & 19
2022	Real Husbands of Hollywood: More Kevin, More Problems	Himself	Main Cast
2026	Terry McMillan Presents: Tempted 2 Love	Ellis	TV movie

== Accolades ==
Year	Awards	Category	Recipient	Outcome
2002	NAACP Image Award	NAACP Image Award for Outstanding Supporting Actor in a Drama Series	Soul Food	Nominated
2003	NAACP Image Award	NAACP Image Award for Outstanding Supporting Actor in a Drama Series	Soul Food	Nominated
2004	NAACP Image Award	NAACP Image Award for Outstanding Supporting Actor in a Drama Series	Soul Food	Nominated
2013	Black Reel Award	Black Reel Award for Best Supporting Actor	A Killer Among Us	Nominated
2014	NAACP Image Award	NAACP Image Award for Outstanding Supporting Actor in a Comedy Series	Real Husbands of Hollywood	Nominated
