= Brown Sugar (2002 film) =

2002 film by Rick Famuyiwa

- Theatrical release poster
- Directed by: Rick Famuyiwa
- Screenplay by: Michael Elliot; Rick Famuyiwa
- Story by: Michael Elliot
- Produced by: Peter Heller
- Starring: Taye Diggs; Sanaa Lathan; Mos Def; Nicole Ari Parker; Boris Kodjoe; Queen Latifah
- Cinematography: Enrique Chediak
- Edited by: Dirk Westervelt
- Music by: Robert Hurst
- Production companies: Fox Searchlight Pictures; Heller Highwater Productions; Magic Johnson Entertainment
- Distributed by: 20th Century Fox
- Release date: October 11, 2002
- Running time: 109 minutes
- Country: United States
- Language: English
- Budget: $8 million
- Box office: $28.3 million

Brown Sugar is a 2002 American romantic comedy film directed by Rick Famuyiwa, written by Famuyiwa and Michael Elliot, and starring Taye Diggs and Sanaa Lathan. The film is a story of lifelong friends, A&R Andre and Editor-in-Chief Sidney. The two can attribute their friendship and the launch of their careers to a single, seminal childhood moment – the day they discovered hip-hop on a New York street corner. Now some 15 years later, as they lay down the tracks toward their futures, hip-hop isn't the only thing that keeps them coming back to that moment on the corner.

The movie was released in the US on October 11, 2002, and ran for 16 weeks, grossing $27,363,891 domestically and $952,560 in the foreign sector for a worldwide total of $28,316,451.

== Plot ==
Childhood friends Sidney and Dre, who originally bonded over their love of hip-hop, face an evolving relationship as adults. Sidney has just been appointed the editor-in-chief of the hip hop magazine XXL, and Dre is an A&R for Millennium Records. While Sidney's career is flourishing, Dre is increasingly frustrated with his label's preference for marketable artists over true talent.

Dre meets and falls in love with Reese, a successful entertainment attorney, and soon becomes engaged to her. The night before Dre's wedding, he and Sidney kiss and almost have sex, but they stop themselves. At the wedding, Sidney's cousin, Francine, deduces the romantic tension between Sidney and Dre and encourages her to object during the ceremony. She does not and Dre settles into married life with Reese. Sidney, meanwhile, begins dating professional athlete Kelby Dawson.

Dre sees Cavi, a rapper who works as a taxi driver during the day, perform and is impressed with his talent, but Cavi is not interested in signing with Dre's label because he does not like the music that they produce. Dre's boss meanwhile pushes him to manage an untalented but commercially viable rap group, forcing him to choose between his income and his love of hip hop. He decides to quit and form his own label, focusing on bringing back the real hip hop that his generation fell in love with, and manages to sign Cavi.

Reese is unsupportive of Dre's new business venture, concerned it will fail and they will be forced to live in reduced circumstances. Meanwhile, Sidney draws closer to Dre due to their partnership in the label, and Reese develops jealousy over Dre and Sidney's friendship, while Cavi falls for Francine but struggles to muster the courage to ask her out.

Sidney also grows closer to Kelby, who proposes to her. Dre tells her that he is against her marrying Kelby because he thinks that he is inauthentic. Sidney does not agree, but begins to have doubts when she discovers that Kelby does not read her articles.

When Dre discovers Reese has been cheating with a man from the gym, he brings Sid to catch her in the act. This leads to a night of shared passion between Dre and Sid and opens Sid's eyes to the fact she is not prepared to marry Kelby. She calls off the engagement and while searching for Dre sees Reese and Dre in a parting embrace that she misconstrues as more.

While at Hot 97 waiting for Cavi's first single to play on the Angie Martinez show, Dre hears Sid talking about her new book I Used to Love H.I.M. Though based on her love affair with hip-hop, it really is a chronicled timeline of her love affair with Dre. He recognizes this and rushes over to the station to confront his feelings, as well. Meanwhile, in the production booth, Cavi stumbles in trying to ask Francine out again. She recognizes their attraction and asks him out on a date. The film ends with Cavi's song playing in the same park where their love of hip-hop began.

== Cast ==
- Taye Diggs as Andre Romulus 'Dre' Ellis
  - Marc John Jefferies as Young Dre Ellis
- Sanaa Lathan as Sidney 'Sid' Shaw, Dre's best friend
  - Aaliyyah Hill as Young Sidney
- Mos Def as Christopher Anton 'Cavi' Vichon, a cabby (and secret rapper) who later befriends Dre
- Nicole Ari Parker as Reese Marie Wiggam Ellis, an attorney who later marries Dre
- Boris Kodjoe as Kelby Dawson, an NBA star who Sid meets and starts dating
- Queen Latifah as Francine, Sid's cousin
- Wendell Pierce as Simon, Dre's boss at Millennium Records
- Erik Weiner as Ren, half of The Hip Hop Dalmatians
- Reggi Wyns as Ten, half of The Hip Hop Dalmatians
- Venida Evans as Aunt Betty
- Liza Lapira as Hot 97 Receptionist
- Wyking Jones as Bartender

Cameo appearances

- Big Daddy Kane as Himself
- Kool G Rap as Himself
- Pete Rock as Himself
- De La Soul as Themselves
- Tariq Trotter aka Black Thought as Himself
- Jermaine Dupri as Himself
- Talib Kweli as Himself
- Common as Himself
- Method Man as Himself
- Slick Rick as Freestyler
- Dana Dane as Freestyler
- Jen Taylor as Boathouse Attendant
- Doug E. Fresh as Beatboxer
- Ahmir Thompson aka Questlove as Himself
- Russell Simmons as Himself
- Fabolous as Himself
- Beanie Sigel as Himself
- Angie Martinez as Herself
- Kimora Lee as Herself

== Reception ==
Brown Sugar received generally positive reviews from critics. On Rotten Tomatoes, the film has an approval rating of 66% based on 88 reviews, with an average rating of 6.2/10. The site's critical consensus reads: "Though predictable and possibly too sweet, Brown Sugar is charming, well-acted, and smarter than typical rom-com fare." On Metacritic, the film holds a score of 58 out of 100, indicating "mixed or average reviews". Audiences polled by CinemaScore gave the film an average grade of "A" on an A+ to F scale.

In the Chicago Sun-Times, Roger Ebert gave Brown Sugar three out of four stars and said it was "more like a slice of black professional life" than a rap comedy, a film thoughtful about its characters, who he said were as deep and complex as those in Terry McMillan novels. Dave Kehr of The New York Times praised the film, saying it "sustains the charm of an early 60's New York romance," and noted that "It resembles one of those films like Peter Tewksbury's Sunday in New York or Vincente Minnelli's Courtship of Eddie's Father, in which the city is a wonderfully bright, benign, fulfilling place and nothing really bad could ever happen."

Accolades

2003 NAACP Image Awards (nominations)

- Outstanding Motion Picture
- Outstanding Actor in a Motion Picture — Taye Diggs
- Outstanding Actress in a Motion Picture — Sanaa Lathan
- Outstanding Supporting Actor in a Motion Picture — Mos Def
- Outstanding Supporting Actor in a Motion Picture — Boris Kodjoe
- Outstanding Supporting Actress in a Motion Picture — Queen Latifah
- Outstanding Supporting Actress in a Motion Picture — Nicole Ari Parker

== Soundtrack ==
A soundtrack containing hip hop and R&B music was released on September 24, 2002, by MCA Records. It peaked at #16 on the Billboard 200 and #2 on the Top R&B/Hip-Hop Albums.
