= Donald Yacovone =

American researcher, writer and academic (born 1952)

Donald Yacovone (born February 25, 1952) is an American researcher, writer and academic who primarily specializes in African American History. In 2013, he co-authored with Henry Louis Gates Jr the book based on the PBS television series The African Americans: Many Rivers to Cross.

== Education ==
Born on February 25, 1952, in Hartford, Connecticut, to Alfred F. and Mary E. (Ostrowska) Yacovone, Donald Yacovone earned his Bachelor of Science from Southern Connecticut State University in 1974. He went on to earn a Master of Arts from Trinity College in Hartford, Connecticut, in 1977 and then earned his Doctor of Philosophy from Claremont Graduate School in 1984.

== Career ==
In 2013, Yacovone co-authored The African Americans: Many Rivers to Cross with Henry Louis Gates Jr, a book of the television series hosted by Gates Jr. The book has been criticized by some for not dating back to pre-slavery times.

He is the research manager at the W.E.B. Du Bois Institute at and an associate at the Hutchins Center for African and African American Research, both at Harvard University. Yacovone has written for The Chronicle of Higher Education on the topic of racism through history in textbooks and in academia.

In 2022, Yacovone's book, Teaching White Supremacy: America’s Democratic Ordeal and the Forging of our National Identity, was shortlisted for the Los Angeles Times Book Prize for History.

== Bibliography ==
- Freedom's Journey: African American Voices of the Civil War (The Library of Black America series) – February 2004
- Samuel Joseph May and the Dilemmas of the Liberal Persuasion, 1797-1871

As Editor

- Wendell Phillips, Social Justice, and the Power of the Past - November, 2016
