= India Arie discography =

Albums and singles

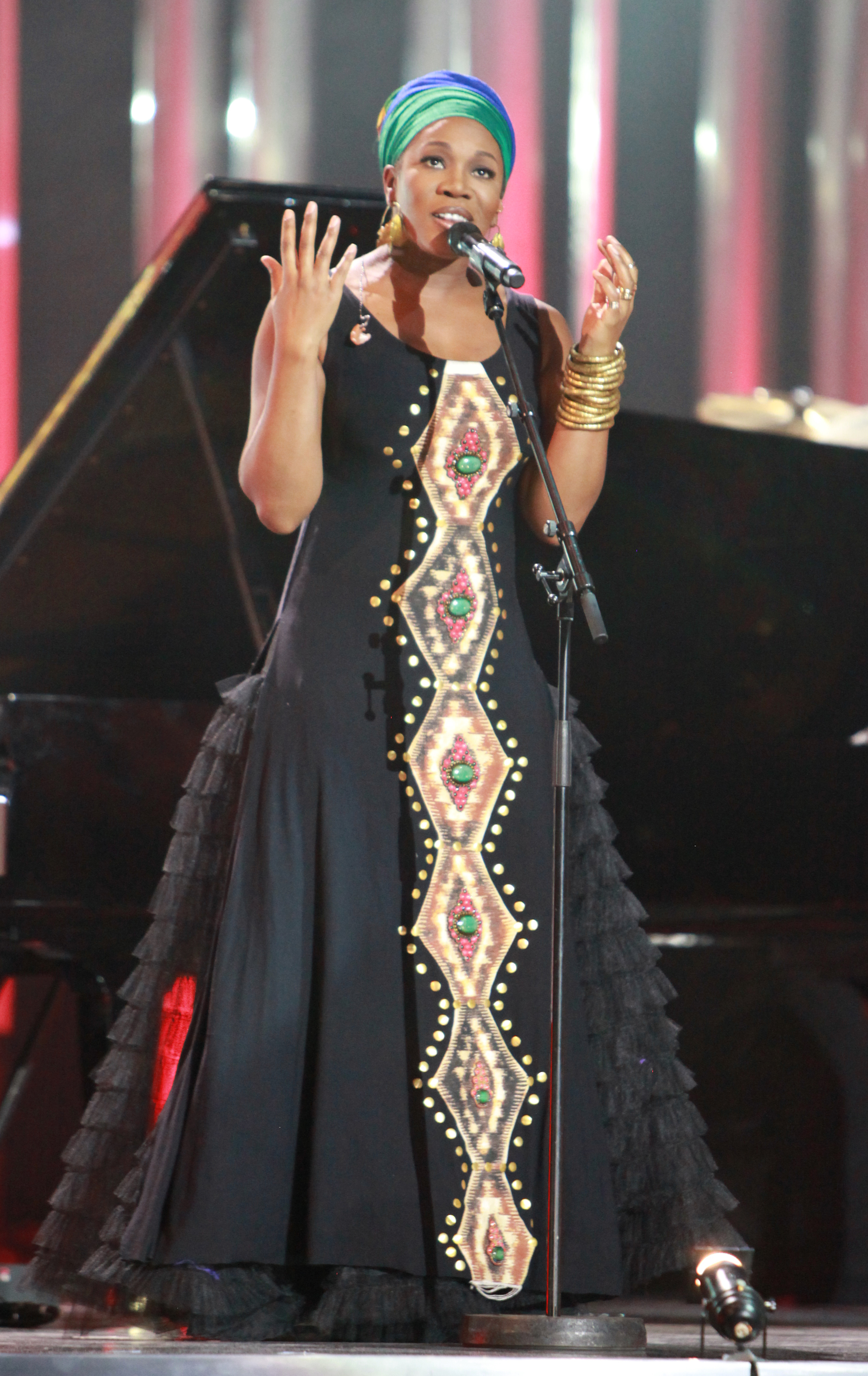
- Arie performing in 2010
- Studio albums: 6
- Extended plays: 1
- Singles: 18

American singer India Arie has released six studio albums, one extended plays, and eighteen singles.

== Studio albums ==
List of studio albums, with selected chart positions, details and certifications
Title	Album details	Peak chart positions										Certifications
Title	Album details	US	US R&B /HH	US R&B	AUS	GER	NL	NZ	SWE	SWI	UK	Certifications
Acoustic Soul	Released: March 27, 2001; Label: Motown Records; Formats: CD, LP, DL, streaming	10	3	—	36	50	21	19	43	85	55	RIAA: 2× Platinum; BPI: Gold; MC: Platinum
Voyage to India	Released: September 24, 2002; Label: Motown Records; Formats: CD, LP, DL, streaming	6	1	—	67	90	47	—	37	53	82	RIAA: Platinum; BPI: Silver; MC: Gold
Testimony: Vol. 1, Life & Relationship	Released: June 27, 2006; Label: Motown Records; Formats: CD, LP, DL, streaming	1	1	—	80	58	24	—	—	25	103	RIAA: Gold
Testimony: Vol. 2, Love & Politics	Released: February 10, 2009; Label: Soulbird Music, Universal Republic; Formats: CD, LP, DL, streaming	3	2	—	—	—	53	—	—	44	—	
Songversation	Released: June 25, 2013; Label: Soulbird Music, Motown; Formats: CD, LP, DL, streaming	7	4	1	—	—	88	—	—	—	—	
Christmas with Friends (with Joe Sample)	Released: October 16, 2015; Label: Soulbird Music, Motown; Formats: CD, DL, streaming	107	—	7	—	—	—	—	—	—	—	
Worthy	Released: February 15, 2019; Label: Soulbird Music, BMG; Formats: CD, DL, streaming	152	—	17	—	—	—	—	—	—	—	
"—" denotes releases that did not chart or not released to that country.

== Extended plays ==
- SongVersation: Medicine (June 30, 2017)

== Singles ==
Year	Single	Peak chart positions									Album
Year	Single	US	US R&B /HH	US Adult R&B	US R&B/HH Airplay	US AC	AUS	CAN	SWE	UK	Album
2001	"Video"	47	14	6	9	—	—	—	—	32	Acoustic Soul
2001	"Brown Skin"	— (Note: "Brown Skin" did not enter the Billboard Hot 100, but peaked at number nine on the Bubbling Under Hot 100 Singles chart.)	39	9	30	—	95	—	—	29	Acoustic Soul
2001	"Strength, Courage & Wisdom"	—	76	16	71	—	—	—	—	—	Acoustic Soul
2001	"Ready for Love"	—	— (Note: "Ready for Love" did not enter the Hot R&B/Hip-Hop Songs chart, but peaked at number 25 on the Bubbling Under R&B/Hip-Hop Songs chart.)	—	—	—	—	—	—	—	Acoustic Soul
2002	"Little Things"	89	33	3	30	—	—	—	—	62	Voyage to India
2003	"Can I Walk with You"	—	—	—	—	—	—	—	—	—	Voyage to India
2003	"The Truth"	—	— (Note: "The Truth" did not enter the Hot R&B/Hip-Hop Songs chart, but peaked at number eight on the Bubbling Under R&B/Hip-Hop Songs chart.)	24	—	—	—	—	—	—	Voyage to India
2003	"Get It Together"	—	—	—	—	—	—	—	—	—	Voyage to India
2005	"Purify Me"	—	53	5	48	—	—	—	—	—	Diary of a Mad Black Woman (soundtrack)
2006	"I Am Not My Hair"	97	47	13	57	—	—	—	—	65	Testimony: Vol. 1, Life & Relationship
2006	"The Heart of the Matter"	—	—	—	—	—	—	33	46	79	Testimony: Vol. 1, Life & Relationship
2006	"There's Hope"	— (Note: "There's Hope" did not enter the Billboard Hot 100, but peaked at number five on the Bubbling Under Hot 100 Singles chart.)	33	5	32	—	—	—	—	—	Testimony: Vol. 1, Life & Relationship
2007	"Beautiful Flower"	56	—	—	—	—	—	90	—	—	Testimony: Vol. 2, Love & Politics
2008	"Chocolate High" (featuring Musiq Soulchild)	— (Note: "Chocolate High" did not enter the Billboard Hot 100, but peaked at number 14 on the Bubbling Under Hot 100 Singles chart.)	19	3	19	—	—	—	—	—	Testimony: Vol. 2, Love & Politics
2009	"Therapy" (featuring Gramps Morgan)	—	—	—	—	22	—	—	—	—	Testimony: Vol. 2, Love & Politics
2012	"6th Avenue"	—	—	—	—	—	—	—	—	—	Songversation
2013	"Cocoa Butter"	—	—	20	—	—	—	—	—	—	Songversation
2013	"Just Do You"	—	—	—	—	—	—	—	—	—	Songversation
2016	"Breathe"	—	—	21	—	—	—	—	—	—	SongVersation: Medicine - EP
2018	"That Magic"	—	—	6	30	—	—	—	—	—	Worthy
2019	"Steady Love"	—	—	1	19	—	—	—	—	—	Worthy
"—" denotes releases that did not chart or not released to that country

=== As a featured guest ===
Year	Single	Artist	Peak chart positions										Album
Year	Single	Artist	US	US R&B	US Main	US AC	CAN	NOR	IRE	NZ	SWE	SPA	Album
2001	"Peaceful World"	John Mellencamp	104	—	38	27	—	—	—	—	—	—	Cuttin' Heads
2002	"Just Another Parade"	Cassandra Wilson	—	—	—	—	—	—	—	—	—	—	Belly of the Sun
2008	"Words"	Anthony David	—	53	—	—	—	—	—	—	—	—	Acey Duecy
2010	"We Are the World 25 for Haiti"	Artists for Haiti	2	—	—	—	7	1	9	8	5	15	Non-album song
2010	"While My Guitar Gently Weeps"	Santana	—	—	—	24	—	—	—	—	—	—	Guitar Heaven
"—" denotes releases that did not chart
