= Dru Castro =

Andrew Castro
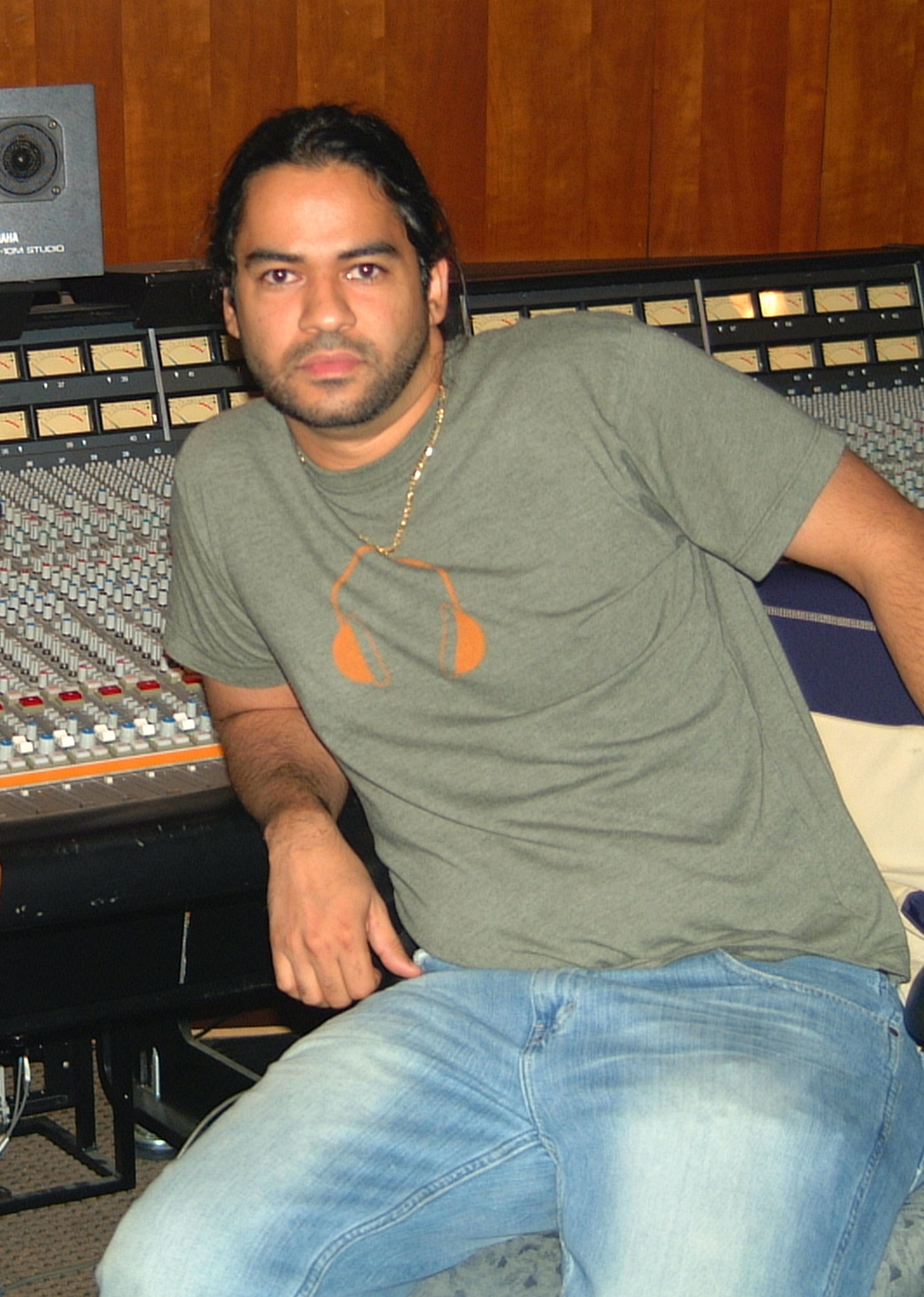
- Castro in 2005

Background information
- Also known as: "Dru" Castro
- Born: Andrew Luis Castro; Manhattan, New York, U.S.
- Genres: Pop; R&B; hip-hop
- Occupations: Audio engineer; record producer
- Years active: 2003–present
- Website: www.drucastro.com

Andrew Luis "Dru" Castro is a recording engineer, producer and songwriter based in Atlanta, Georgia. He has produced or engineered songs for artists such as Childish Gambino, Usher, Nelly, Pentatonix, Ciara, Keyshia Cole, T-Pain, Trina, Jamie Foxx, and India.Arie. In 2009, Castro produced, engineered and wrote all the songs with India.Arie on her with the 3X Grammy (1X winning) nominated album Testimony: Vol. 2, Love & Politics. In 2018 Castro won a Grammy as Engineer for Record of the Year on the song "This is America". Castro has worked on 19 Grammy nominated projects, of which 5 have won the award.

== Biography ==
=== Early years ===
Castro was born in Manhattan, New York and was raised in the West Palm Beach, Florida. His father and mother, who are both of Puerto Rican descent, were also born in Manhattan. From an early age Castro grew up in a musical home, where his father played piano and was the musical director of a local church. This musical influence lead Castro to start playing piano at age 5. Castro was sent to study at Suncoast Community High School, a magnet school in Riviera Beach, Florida. While there, he was active in the Jazz, Concert and Marching bands.

=== Recording and Mixing ===
Castro moved to Atlanta in 1999, where he began engineering full-time in the booming Atlanta R&B and Hip-Hop music scene. Tricky Stewart, Bryan Michael Cox, Anthony Dent, Polow Da Don, and Sean Garrett were among the first to offer Castro a break into the recording business. Castro has recorded, amongst others, Usher, Keyshia Cole, Ciara, T-Pain, Jamie Foxx, India.Arie, Trina, Raven-Symoné, Joe, Kelly Rowland, Stacie Orrico, and Keri Hilson. Castro has also worked on 19 Grammy nominated albums (5 have won the award) See Below.

=== Music House Studios ===
From 2006-2013, Castro owned and operated Music House Studios with fellow engineer and friend Alec Newell. The opening of "The Music House" was the fulfillment of a lifelong dream. Many artists including Usher, Ciara, Brandi, India.Arie, Keyshia cole, Yo Gotti, Lacrea, Rico Love, New Kids on the Block and Nelly had worked at the state of the art recording facility in North Atlanta.

=== Production ===
Beginning production work in 2003, his first major release as a producer came in June 2006 on the US #1 Debut Album Testimony: Vol. 1, Life & Relationship for India.Arie. He produced and co-wrote the upbeat "I Choose" and a more reflective "This Too Shall Pass". This was followed in July 2008 with the production of the single entitled "Radio" on Musiq Soulchild's fifth album release "On my Radio". In February 2009 India.Arie's Testimony: Vol. 2, Love & Politics was released. Castro produced and recorded 12 songs with India.Arie, including the singles "Chocolate High" and "Therapy". Castro continues to produce and record in Atlanta.

== Selected discography ==
Artist	Album	Credit
2003
Loon	Loon	Engineer
Stacie Orrico	Stacie Orrico	Engineer
702	Star	Engineer
2004
Allure	Chapter III	Mixing
Young Buck	Cashville: G-Unit Edition	Engineer
Young Buck	Straight Outta Cashville	Engineer
Raven-Symoné	This Is My Time	Engineer
Shawnna	Worth tha Weight	Mixing
2005
T-Pain	Rappa Ternt Sanga	Engineer
Maceo	Straight Out da Pot	Engineer, Mixing
Original Soundtrack	Diary of a Mad Black Woman	Engineer
Jamie Foxx	Unpredictable	Engineer
Jamie Foxx	Unpredictable [DualDisc]	Engineer
2006
Paulina Rubio	Ananda	Engineer
Young Buck	Buck the World	Engineer
Avant	Director	Engineer
Fergie	The Dutchess	Engineer
Eminem	Eminem Presents: The Re-Up	Engineer
Ciara	Ciara: The Evolution	Engineer
Jagged Edge	The Hits	Piano Engineer
Jagged Edge	Jagged Edge	Piano Engineer
Lloyd Banks	Rotten Apple	Engineer
Sammie	Sammie	Engineer
Stacie Orrico	Stacie Orrico [Korean Tour]	Engineer
India.Arie	Testimony: Vol. 1, Life & Relationship	Producer, Engineer, Vocal Engineer
2007
Joe	Ain't Nothin' Like Me	Engineer
Various Artists	Def Jam Sessions, Vol. 1	Engineer
R. Kelly	Double Up	Engineer
Mary J. Blige	Growing Pains	Engineer
Keyshia Cole	Just Like You	Engineer
Kelly Rowland	Ms. Kelly	Engineer
Rich Boy	Rich Boy	Engineer
2008
Stacie Orrico	Best of Stacie Orrico	Engineer
Raheem DeVaughn	Love Behind the Melody	Engineer
Algebra	Purpose	Bass
Trina	Still da Baddest	Engineer
Musiq Soulchild	OnMyRadio	Producer, Engineer
2009
India.Arie	Testimony: Vol. 2, Love & Politics	Album Producer, Album Engineer
Keri Hilson	In a Perfect World...	Engineer
K Jon	On The Ocean	Mixing
2010
Usher	Raymond v. Raymond	Musician
Usher	Versus	Musician
Various Artist	Pure Urban Essentials 2010	Composer
2012
Lecrae	Gravity	Producer (with Uforo Ebong)
Keyshia Cole	Woman to Woman	Producer, Musician
Mario Brown	The Mario Brown Project	Mixer
2013
India.Arie	Songversation	Producer, Musician, Engineer
2014
R. Kelly	The Essential R. Kelly	Engineer
2015
Pentatonix	Pentatonix	Engineer

== Singles Recorded/Mixed by Dru Castro ==
Artist	Song	Album
2005
India.Arie	"Purify Me"	Diary of a Mad Black Woman
2006
R. Kelly, Usher	"Same Girl"	Double Up
Eminem	"Smack Dat"	Eminem Presents: The Re-Up
Fergie	"London Bridge"	The Dutchess
Lloyd Banks	"Help"	Rotten Apple
2007
Keyshia Cole	"Shoulda Let You Go"	Just Like You
Kelly Rowland, Eve	"Like This"	Ms. Kelly
Young Buck	"Get Buck"	Buck The World
2008
India.Arie	"Heart of the Matter"	Testimony: Vol. 2, Love & Politics
Keyshia Cole	"Heaven Sent"	Just Like You
Keri Hilson	"My Energy"	In a Perfect World...
Musiq Soulchild	"Radio"	OnMyRadio
India.Arie, Musiq Soulchild	"Chocolate High"	Testimony: Vol. 2, Love & Politics

== Singles Produced by Dru Castro ==
Artist	Song	Album	Notes
2008
Musiq Soulchild	"Radio"	On My Radio	
India.Arie, Music Soulchild	"Chocolate High"	Testimony: Vol. 2, Love & Politics	
2009
India.Arie	"Therapy"	Testimony: Vol. 2, Love & Politics	
K'Jon	"On The Ocean"	On The Ocean	Producer /Mixer

== Grammys ==
Artist	Song	Album	Category	Result	Credit
2006
India.Arie		Testimony: Vol. 1, Life & Relationship	Best R&B Album	Nominated	Engineer
India.Arie	"I Am Not My Hair"	Testimony: Vol. 1, Life & Relationship	Best R&B Song	Nominated	Engineer
2007
Keyshia Cole		Just Like You	Best Contemporary R&B Album	Nominated	Engineer
R. Kelly, Usher	"Same Girl"	Double Up	Best R&B Performance By A Duo Or Group With Vocals	Nominated	Engineer
2008
Mary J. Blige		Growing Pains	Best R&B Album	Won	Engineer
Keyshia Cole	"Heaven Sent"	Just Like You	Best Female R&B Vocal Performance	Nominated	Engineer
Keyshia Cole	"Heaven Sent"	Just Like You	Best R&B Song	Nominated	Engineer
2009
India.Arie	"Pearls"	Testimony: Vol. 2, Love & Politics	Best Urban/Alternative Performance	Won	Producer/Engineer
India.Arie		Testimony: Vol. 2, Love & Politics	Best Contemporary R&B Album	Nominated	Producer/Engineer
India.Arie, Musiq Souldchild	"Chocolate High"	Testimony: Vol. 2, Love & Politics	Best R&B Duo or Group with vocals	Nominated	Producer/Engineer
2012
Usher		Raymond V Raymond	Best Contemporary R&B Album	Won	Musician
Lecrae		"Gravity"	Best Gospel Album	Won	Producer/Engineer/Songwriter
2018
Childish Gambino	This is America	This is America	Record of the Year	Won	Engineer
