= Worthy (India Arie album) =

Studio album by India Arie
- Released: February 15, 2019
- Genre: R&B
- Length: 51:44
- Label: Soulbird Music
- Producer: Aaron W. Lindsey, India Arie, Branden Burch, Chuck Butler

India Arie chronology
Christmas with Friends (2015)	Worthy (2019)

Worthy is the sixth studio album by American singer India Arie released on February 15, 2019, by Soulbird Music. The album peaked at No. 5 on the US Billboard Top Independent Albums. As well at No. 17 on the US Billboard Top R&B Albums charts.

== Critical reception ==
Professional ratings
Review scores
Source	Rating
Allmusic	3.5/5 stars

Andy Kellman of Allmusic wrote "India Arie Simpson's first proper album since 2013's SongVersation, Worthy is truly the follow-up to 2017's SongVersation: Medicine, an EP."

== Singles ==
A single called "That Magic" peaked at No. 6 on the US Billboard Adult R&B Songs chart. Another song from Worthy, entitled "Steady Love", got to No. 1 on the US Billboard Adult R&B Songs chart. "Steady Love" was also Grammy nominated in the category of Best Traditional R&B Performance.

== Tracklisting ==
No.	Title	Writer(s)	Length
1.	"Worthy (Intro)"
2.	"What If"	Aaron W. Lindsey, Chuck Butler, India.Arie
3.	"Steady Love"	Aaron W. Lindsey, India.Arie
4.	"Rollercoaster"	Drew Ramsey, India.Arie, Paige Lackee Martin, Shannon Sanders, Stephen Hill
5.	"In Good Trouble"	India.Arie
6.	"Crazy"	India.Arie, Joel Cross
7.	"Hour Of Love"	India.Arie, Joel Cross
8.	"Worthy (Interlude)"
9.	"That Magic"	Branden Burch, India.Arie
10.	"Follow The Sun"	India.Arie, Shannon Sanders
11.	"We Are"	India.Arie, Joel Cross
12.	"Coulda Shoulda Woulda"	Aaron W. Lindsey, India.Arie
13.	"Prayer For Humanity"	Aaron W. Lindsey, India.Arie
14.	"Worthy"	India.Arie, Angela Cross, Joel Cross
15.	"Sacred Space"	India.Arie, Shannon Sanders
16.	"Worthy (Outro)"

== Credits ==
- Art Direction, Design – Annalee Valencia-Bruch
- Assistant Mixer – Elliott England
- Editor – Greg 'G Roni' Fuqua, Jeff Cain, Jon Blass, Marc Lacuesta
- Executive Producer – Aaron W. Lindsey
- Lead Vocals – India Arie
- Mastering – Andrew Mendelson, Reuben Cohen
- Mixing – Jeff Cain, Jon Blass, Richard Furch
- Photography – Benedict Evans, Duan Davis
- Producer – Aaron W. Lindsey, India.Arie, Branden Burch, Chuck Butler
- Programming – Chuck Butler
- Production Manager – Ken Johnson
