= Jared Lee Gosselin =

American record producer (born 1981)

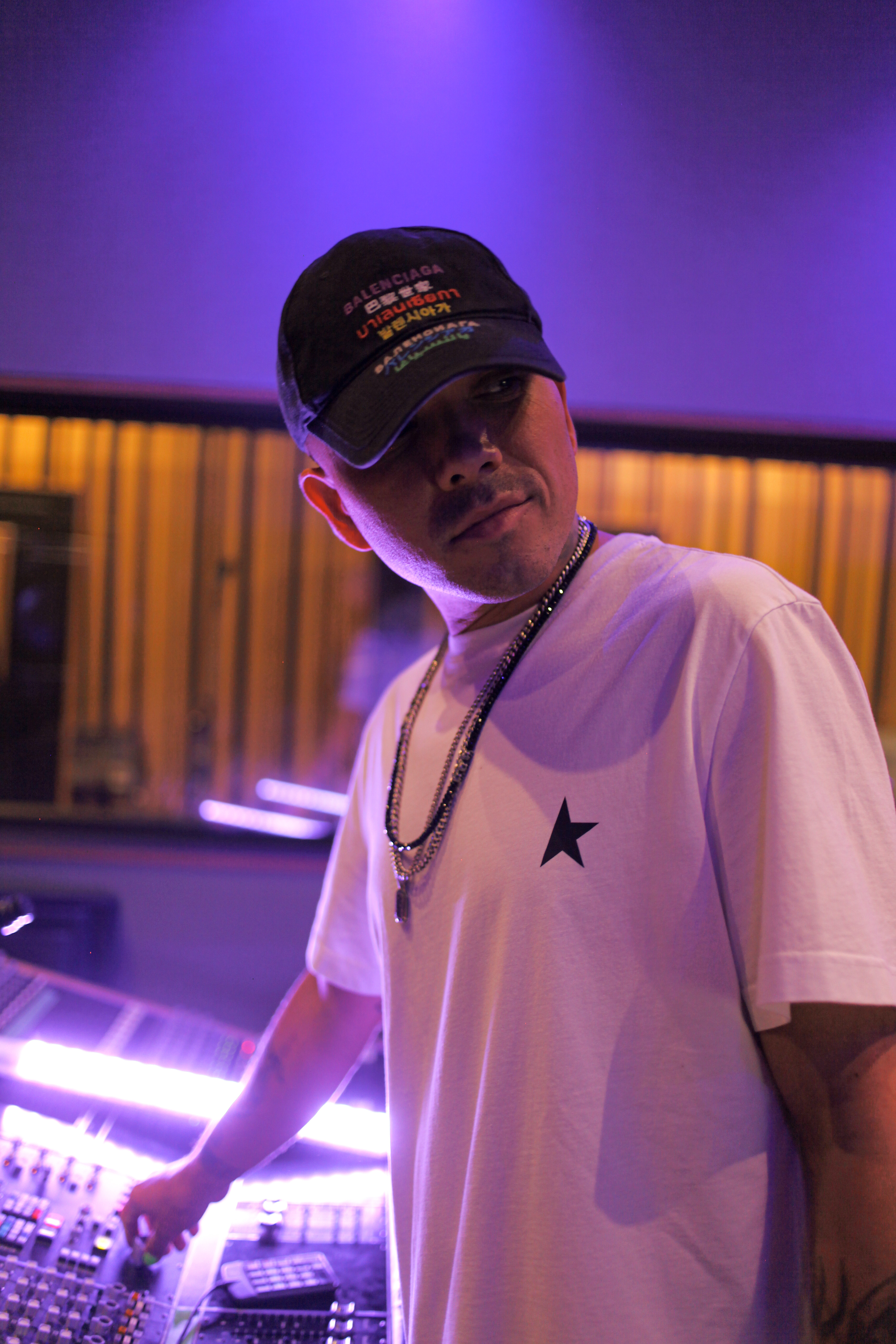
- Gosselin in 2021

Background information
- Also known as: J Lee, Jared Gosselin, J Gosselin, JLG
- Born: June 23, 1981 (age 43); Detroit, Michigan, U.S.
- Genres: Hip hop; rock; electronic; experimental
- Occupation: Record producer
- Years active: 1999–present
- Labels: Sony; Universal Motown; Warner Brothers

Jared Lee Gosselin (born June 23, 1981) is an American record producer from Detroit, Michigan, United States. Gosselin got his start in the entertainment industry when the city was at its hip-hop height. Gosselin produced tracks for former Eminem affiliate, the late Proof of D12. Through that relationship, Gosselin met and worked with a number of Michigan hip-hop artists before turning his sights to the west coast. After a chance meeting with actor/director Forest Whitaker, Gosselin began to contribute music to a number of films, soundtracks, and more. He was then introduced to Macy Gray and officially moved to Los Angeles to help Gray work on her album in 2003. He has since contributed music to artists such as Gray, JoJo, The PussyCat Dolls, Christina Millian, Kane Brown, Swae Lee, Ghostface Killah, Neon Trees, the Netflix series, Carmen Sandiego and a number of high-profile brands including Go Pro, ESPN X Games, and Under Armour.

Gosselin's abilities as a producer and engineer have led him to collaborate with notable artists including India Arie, Macy Gray, Young Jeezy, Keyshia Cole, Nicole Scherzinger (lead singer of the Pussycat Dolls), Floetry, Cheri Dennis, Game, Proof, Obie Trice, and Corinne Bailey Rae, among others. He also contributed to the soundtrack of the film "De Ja Vu" starring Denzel Washington and received a Grammy nomination in 2006 for his work on India Arie's album "Testimony: Vol.1, Life & Relationships."

== Early life ==
Gosselin was born to Cynthia Lee Gosselin, who is a single mother and works as a hairdresser in Grosse Pointe, Michigan. His father, Paul Joseph Gosselin, a single father, works in the automotive business doing quality control for the big 3.

== 2013 Latin Grammy win ==
On November 21, 2013, in Las Vegas, Nevada, Gosselin won his first Grammy Award for the Beto Cuevas album Transformacion for Major Album Pop/Rock – Transformicaion

== Current career ==
Composer, producer, Mixer for the Netflix Original Carmen Sandiego Music for the Summer 2018 X Games

Studio : L1N3

Publisher : Royalty Network

Management: Apotheosis Endeavors

TV / Film licensing : North Star Media

== Billboard chart peaks by year ==
Year	Album	Artist	Contribution	Peak Chart
2004	Shark Tale	Original Soundtrack	Producer	U.S. Billboard 200 No. 34 & U.S. Billboard Top R&B/Hip Hop Albums No. 48 (Peak Chart)
2005	Flo'Ology	Floetry	Composer	U.S. Billboard Top R&B/Hip Hop Albums No. 2 & U.S. Billboard 200 No. 7
2007	Shrek the Third	Original Soundtrack	Producer	U.S. Billboard 200 No. 34 & U.S. Billboard Soundtracks No. 2
2007	Corinne Bailey Rae	Corinne Bailey Rae	Producer	U.S. Billboard 200 No. 4 & U.S. Billboard Top R&B/Hip Hop Albums No. 3
2007	Macy Gray Big	Macy Gray	Producer	Billboard Top R&B/Hip Hop Albums No. 14 & US Billboard 200 No. 39 & U.S. Billboard Hot R&B/Hip Hop Songs No. 55
2008	Hate It Or Love It	Chingy	Producer	U.S. Billboard Top Rap Albums No. 3 & U.S. Top R&B/Hip Hop Albums No. 17 & U.S. Billboard 200 No. 84
2008	In and Out Of Love	Cheri Dennis	Producer	U.S. Billboard 200 No. 74 & U.S. Billboard R&B/Hip Hop Albums No. 11
2008	Joe Thomas	Joe	Producer	U.S. Billboard Top R&B/Hip Hop Albums No. 3 & U.S. Billboard 200 No. 8 & U.S. Billboard Top Independent Albums No. 1 & U.S. Billboard Comprehensive Albums No. 8
2009	Coming Back To You	Melinda Doolittle	Producer	U.S. Billboard 200 No. 59 & U.S. Billboard R&B Albums No. 39 & U.S. Billboard Independent Albums No. 3
2009	Testimony: Vol. 2, Love and Politics	India Arie	Producer	U.S. Billboard Top R&B/Hip Hop Albums No. 2 & U.S. Billboard 200 No. 3
2010	The Sellout	Macy Gray	Producer	U.S. Billboard 200 No. 38 & U.S. Billboard Adult Contemporary No. 23 & Adult Pop Songs No. 40
2012	The Masterpiece	Bobby Brown	Producer	Top R&B Albums No. 41
2012	Transformacion	Beto Cuevas	Producer	Billboard Top Latin Albums No. 38 & Billboard Latin Pop Albums No. 12

== Grammy nominations ==
Year	Album	Artist	Contribution	Nomination Category
2006	Testimony: Vol. 1, Life & Relationship	India Arie	Mixing	Best R&B Album

Year	Album	Artist	Contribution
2004	Shark Tale	Original Soundtrack	Producer
2005	Flo'Ology	Floetry	Composer
2006	De Ja Vu Soundtrack	Various	Mixing
2006	Testimony, Vol. 1: Life & Relationship	India.Arie	Audio Production, producer, composer
2006	Testimony: Vol. 1, Life & Relationship (Circuit City Exclusive Bonus Track)	India.Arie	Producer, composer
2007	Big	Macy Gray	Producer, Programming, composer
2007	Big	Macy Gray	Producer, Programming, composer
2007	Big (Bonus Tracks)	Macy Gray	Producer, Programming, composer
2007	Shrek the Third	Original Soundtrack	Producer
2007	Afro Strut (US Version)	Amp Fiddler	Programming, composer, producer, Mixing
2007	Hate It or Love It	Chingy	Producer, Assistant, Mixing
2010	Almost September	Jared Lee Gosselin, Phillip White, Mc Lyte	Producer

== Discography ==
Year	Album	Artist	Contribution
2004	Shark Tale	Original Soundtrack	Producer
2005	Searching for Jerry Garcia	Proof	Engineer
2005	Flo'Ology	Floetry	Composer
2006	Corinne Bailey Rae [2 CD]	Corinne Bailey Rae	Mixing
2006	Corinne Bailey Rae [Special Edition]	Corinne Bailey Rae	Mixing
2006	Testimony, Vol. 1: Life & Relationship	India.Arie	Audio Production, producer, composer
2006	Testimony: Vol. 1, Life & Relationship (Circuit City Exclusive Bonus Track)	India.Arie	Producer, composer
2006	Afro Strut	Amp Fiddler	Composer
2006	Déjà Vu Soundtrack	Various	Mixing
2007	Big	Macy Gray	Producer, Programming, composer
2007	Big (Bonus Tracks)	Macy Gray	Producer, Programming, composer
2007	Shrek the Third	Original Soundtrack	Producer
2007	Afro Strut (US Version)	Amp Fiddler	Programming, composer, producer, Mixing
2007	Holiday Gift Pack	Corinne Bailey Rae	Mixing
2007	Karaoke: JoJo (singer)	Karaoke	Composer
2007	Hate It or Love It	Chingy	Producer, Assistant, Mixing
2008	"Slap A Bitch"	Macy Gray	Producer
2008	Maximum Bass: Xtreme	Various Artists	Composer
2008	In and Out of Love	Cheri Dennis	Producer, composer
2008	Joe Thomas, New Man	Joe	Programming, Drums, composer, producer
2008	True to the Game	Various Artists	Mixing
2009	New Gospel Voices	Various Artists	Composer
2009	Coming Back to You	Melinda Doolittle	Composer
2009	Testimony, Vol. 2: Love & Politics	India.Arie	Composer
2009	Testimony: Vol. 2, Love & Politics (Bonus Track)	India.Arie	Composer
2009	Quite Like Me	Dionyza Sutton	Composer, producer, Mixing, Programming, Recording
2009	"All Over Me"/”Home"	MC Lyte	Producer
2009	"Gotta Get To You" (Bring It On: Fight To the Finish Soundtrack)	Christina Milian	Producer
2010	Sellout	Macy Gray	Engineer, composer, producer
2010	Fotosintesis	Jaime Kohen	Producer
2010	Genius of Soul Disco Funk	Various Artists	Composer
2010	"Scandalous"	Pittsburg Slim	Producer
2010	"Glass Kisses"	Ashley Martinez	Producer
2010	"I Like It"	Albe Back ft DMC	Producer
2010	Detroit Diamond ft Carmit EP	Various Artists	
2010	Frank Zappa Aaafnraaaa Birthday Bundle	Various Artists	Mixing
2010	"She Can't"	Kim Hill	Producer
2010	Almost September	Jared Lee Gosselin, Phillip White, MC Lyte	Producer
2010	Scandalous	Pittsburgh Slim	Producer
2010	I Like It	Albe Back and DMC Darryl McDaniels	Producer
2010	She Can't	Kim Hill	Producer
2011	Fabric 56	Derrick Carter	Composer
2011	“The Last Rockstar”	Diamond Baby	Producer
2011	Penguin in Bondage: The Little Known History of the Mothers of Invention	Frank Zappa	Mixing
2011	"Bake Me in Clouds"	VIZA	
2011	Get Out the Way	Bobby Brown	Producer
2011	Rock Solid	DMC Darryl McDaniels	Producer
2012	Quiero Creer (feat. Flo Rida)	Beto Cuevas featuring Flo Rida	Producer
2012	Can Be – RICANstruction: The Black Rosary	Chino XL	Producer
2014	Only For Tonight	Al Ca$ino featuring Too Short & Clyde Carson	Producer
2015	SPARK	Novel	Producer
2017	Love Jones – The Musical	Various Artists	Producer
2018	MC Lyte	Revolution	Producer
2019	Carmen Sandiego	Raquel Castro	Main theme composer

=== Singles ===
Year	Song	Artist	Contribution
2016	Love Jones	Raheem DeVaughn (Theme)	Producer
2016	Nobody Does	Musiq SoulChild	Producer
2016	Need to Know	Raheem DeVaughn / Jamecia Bennett	Producer
2016	"Under the Bridge"	Chino XL & Rama Duke	Producer
2016	Flames	Dylan Bernard	Producer
