= Gramps Morgan =

American singer, producer, record executive

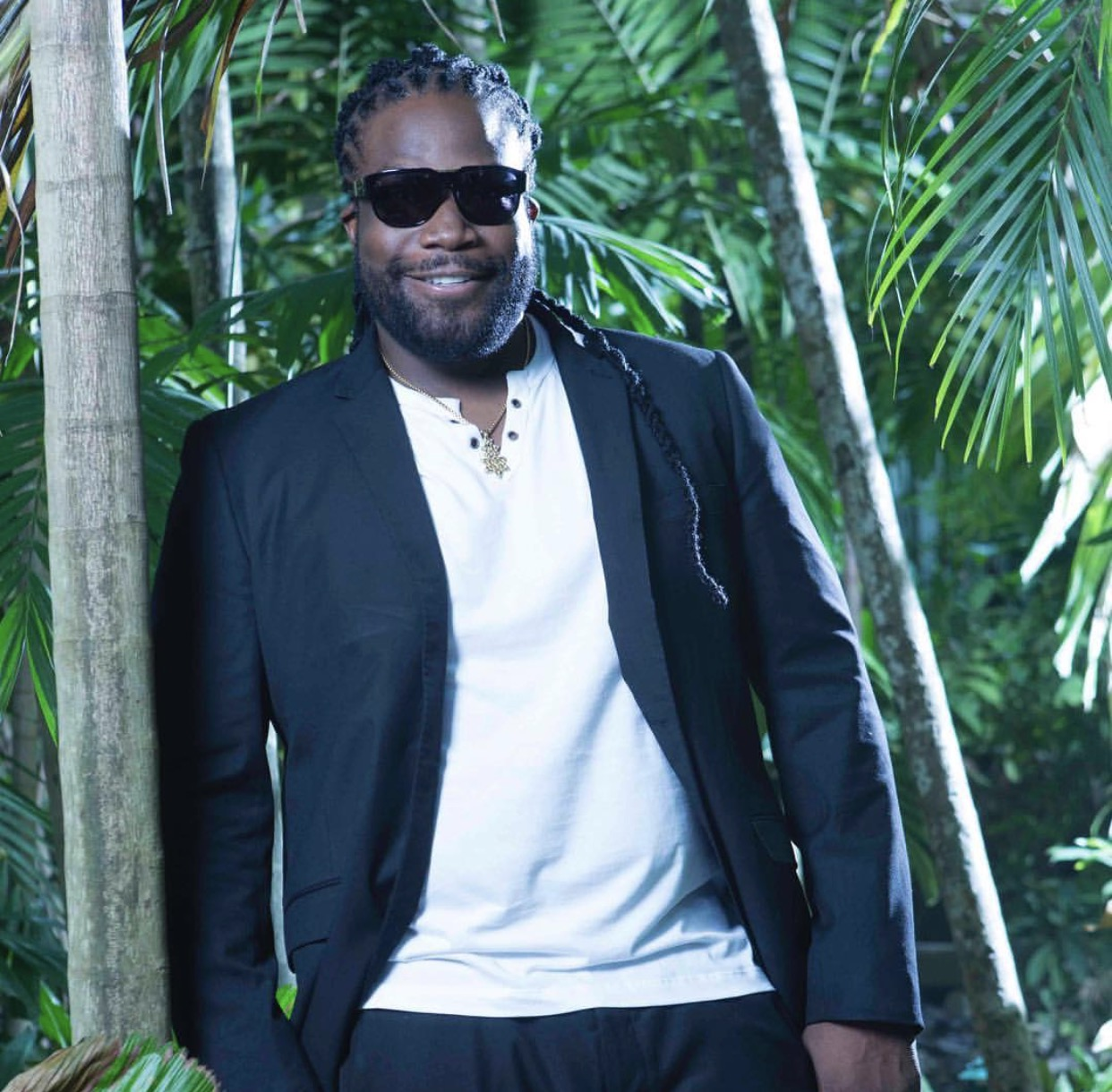
Morgan in 2015

Roy "Gramps" Morgan (born July 7, 1976) is a Jamaican-American singer-songwriter, instrumentalist, producer, record executive, and entrepreneur. Gramps was born in Brooklyn, New York, but was raised partially in Springfield, Massachusetts. He is the son of well-known reggae artist Denroy Morgan, and a founding member of Grammy Award-winning reggae band Morgan Heritage. Most of his brothers and sisters are also in the music business.

== Early life ==
Gramps Morgan was born in Brooklyn, New York, in a large family of 30 children. He was raised in Springfield, Massachusetts by his mother, Pearl Foster, and father, Denroy Morgan. He attended Springfield Central High School in Springfield, Massachusetts with the likes of former NBA player Travis Best. Gramps was a star football player and had multiple scholarship offers to colleges and universities around the country. His passion for music that was embedded at such a young age won the battle between a future in sports versus music. Nevertheless, Gramps was destined for a life in entertainment and continues to do so through his band and on his solo career path.

== Career ==
Following in the steps of his father, he became part of the Morgan Heritage formed in 1994 together with four of his siblings. The other band members are Peter "Peetah" Morgan, Una Morgan, Nakhamyah "Lukes" Morgan and Memmalatel "Mr. Mojo" Morgan. Gramps Morgan plays the keyboard in the band and is also a vocalist alongside Peetah Morgan, the main vocalist. For over two decades, they have had a number of successful reggae albums. To date, the band has released 12 albums, including 2016 Grammy Award Winning Best Reggae Album Strictly Roots. Additionally, Morgan Heritage received 2 Grammy nominations for their album Avrakedabra released in 2017 and feature on Shaggy and Sting's album titled 44/876.

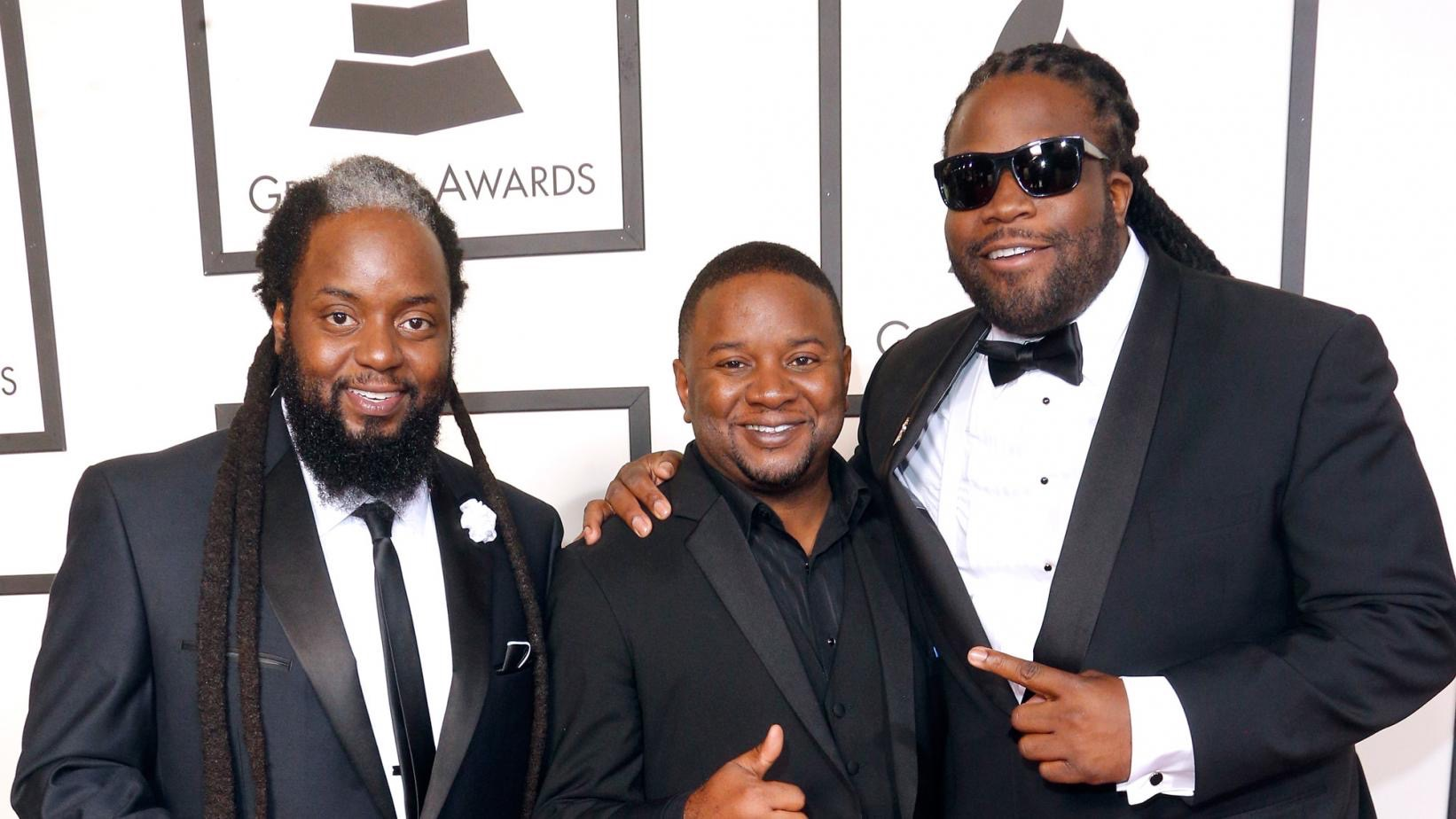
From Left to Right: Peetah, Lukes, and Gramps

=== Solo career ===
Gramps Morgan has also flourished as a successful solo artist and created his own label, Dada Son Entertainment. Gramps has toured and performed with the likes of India.Arie, Buju Banton, John Legend, Tarrus Riley, and Kymani Marley. In 2009, Gramps released his debut solo album entitled 2 Sides of My Heart, Vol. 1, which earned him a number awards. He was also featured on the India.Arie song "Therapy" that charted in the United States. His second solo album, Reggae Music Lives, was released in 2012. Again, Gramps featured on an India.Arie album entitled Songversation. Gramps continues to expand his vocal diversity with upcoming music in a variety of genres recording from all parts of the world.

In 2020, Gramps Morgan released several solo singles including "Runaway Bay" and "People Like You." The latter was nominated in 2021 for three International Reggae and World Music Awards (IRAWMA) in the categories of Best Song, Best Crossover Song and Best Gospel Song, and won the award for Best Gospel Song. Gramps Morgan was also nominated for Best Male Vocalist.

In August 2021, Gramps Morgan released his third solo album, Positive Vibration, produced by Canadian Juno Award-winning singer-songwriter Johnny Reid. The album features guest appearances by India.Arie, Shaggy, Lybran, Denroy Morgan and Jemere Morgan.

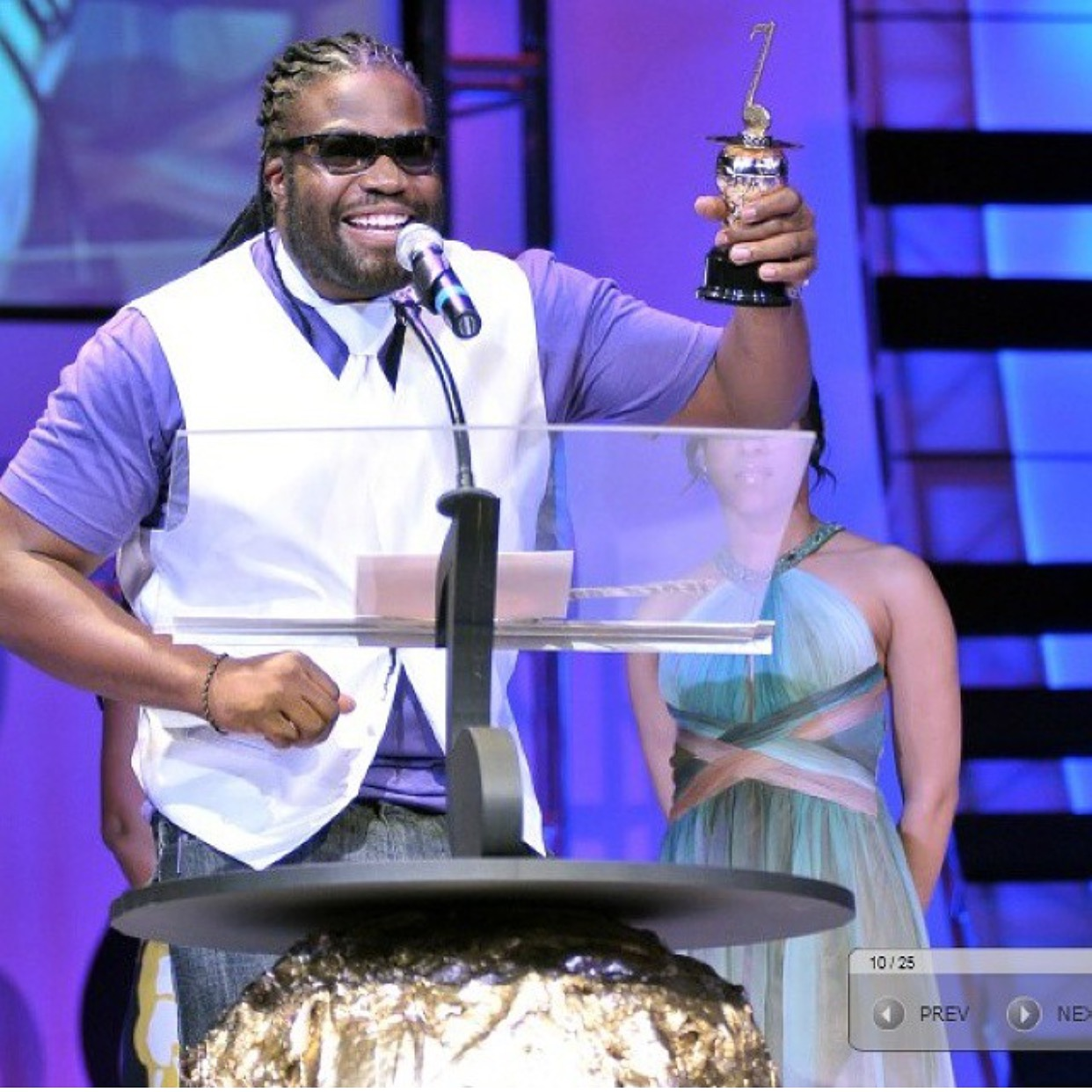

== Personal life ==
Gramps Morgan currently resides in Nashville, Tennessee, where he is an active community member and hosts his own radio show on Acme Radio. He is married to cell and developmental biologist, Dr. Annabelle Manalo. Also known as Dr. Annabelle or Dr. Annabelle Morgan, Gramps's wife received her doctorate from Vanderbilt University. Gramps has 11 children, with his oldest child being Jemere Morgan, who is the pinnacle of the Morgan family's 3rd generation of music. Jemere Morgan has released 2 of his own albums, entitled Transitions and Self Confidence, through Dada Son Entertainment. Jemere frequently tours worldwide both alongside his family and with various other acts.

== Discography ==
=== Albums ===
==== Solo albums ====
Title	Album details
2 Sides of My Heart, Vol. 1	Released: September 1, 2009; Label: Dada Son; Format: CD, Digital download
*Reggae Music Lives	Released: April 24, 2012; Label: Dada Son; Format: CD, digital download
Positive Vibration	Released: July 23, 2021; Label: Halo; Format: CD, Digital download, streaming

==== Morgan Heritage ====
Title	Details
One Calling	Released: January 20, 1998; Label: VP; Format: Cassette. CD
"Don't Haffi Dread"	Released: March 23, 1999; Label: Cool to Be Conscious; Format: Cassette, CD
"Three in One"	Released: April 21, 2003; Label: Cool to Be Conscious; Format: CD, digital download
"Full Circle"	Released: August 1, 2006; Label: VP; Format: CD, digital download
Live Another Rockaz Moment	Released: November 7, 2006; LabeL: Cool to Be Conscious; Format: CD, Digital download
"More Teachings"	Released: October 16, 2007; Label: Cool to Be Conscious; Format: CD, digital download
Protect Us Jah	Released: December 11, 2007; Label: Cool to Be Conscious; Format: CD, digital download
Moegan Heritage Live in Europe	Released: March 30, 2009; Label: Cool to Be Conscious; Format: CD, digital download
Mission in Progress	Released: July 24, 2009; Label: VP; Format: CD, digital download
Morgan Heritage Family and Friends Vol. 3	Released: August 17, 2009; Label: Cool to Be Conscious; Format: CD, digital download
Here Comes the Crown	Released: May 31, 2013; Label: VP; Format: CD, digital download
Strictly Roots	Released: April 20, 2015; Label: Cool to Be Conscious; Format: CD, digital download, streaming
Live in Amsterdam 2003	Released: June 21, 2016; Label: Continental Record Services; Format: CD, digital download, streaming
Loyalty	Released: August 2, 2019; Label: Cool to Be Conscious; Format: CD, digital download, streaming
Penthouse Flashback: Morgan Heritage	Released: August 1, 2019; Label: Penthouse Records; Format: CD, digital download, streaming
Avrakedabra	Released: May 19, 2020; Label: Cool to Be Conscious; Format: CD, digital download, streaming
Legacy	Released: May 28, 2021; Label: Cool to Be Conscious; Format: CD, digital download, streaming
Homeland	Released: April 21, 2023; Label: Cool to Be Conscious; Format: CD, digital download, streaming

=== Extended plays ===
Title	Details
Deeper	Released: September 23, 2022; Label: Halo; Format: Digital download, streaming

=== Singles ===
==== As lead artist ====
Title	Year	Album
"Life Too Short"	2012	Non-album singles
"Free"	2014	Non-album singles
"People Like You"	2020	Non-album singles
"Be Free" (with Mojo Morgan and Stephen Marley)	2020	Non-album singles
"Runaway Bay"	2020	Positive Vibration
"Fa La La La La"	2020	Non-album single
"Runway Bay" (Acoustic)	2021	Deeper
"Wash the Tears" (Acoustic)	2021	Deeper
"A Woman Like You"	2021	Positive Vibration
"Positive Vibration"	2021	Positive Vibration
"If You're Looking for Me"	2021	Positive Vibration
"I Wish It Could Be Christmas Everyday"	2021	Non-album single

==== As featured artist ====
Title	Year	Album
"Therapy" (India.Arie featuring Gramps Morgan) (Note: "Therapy peaked at No. 22 on the US R&B/Hip-Hop Songs chart.) (Note: "Therapy peaked at No. 22 on the US Adult Contemporary` charts.)	2009	Testimony: Vol. 2, Love & Politics
