= Anthony David (singer) =

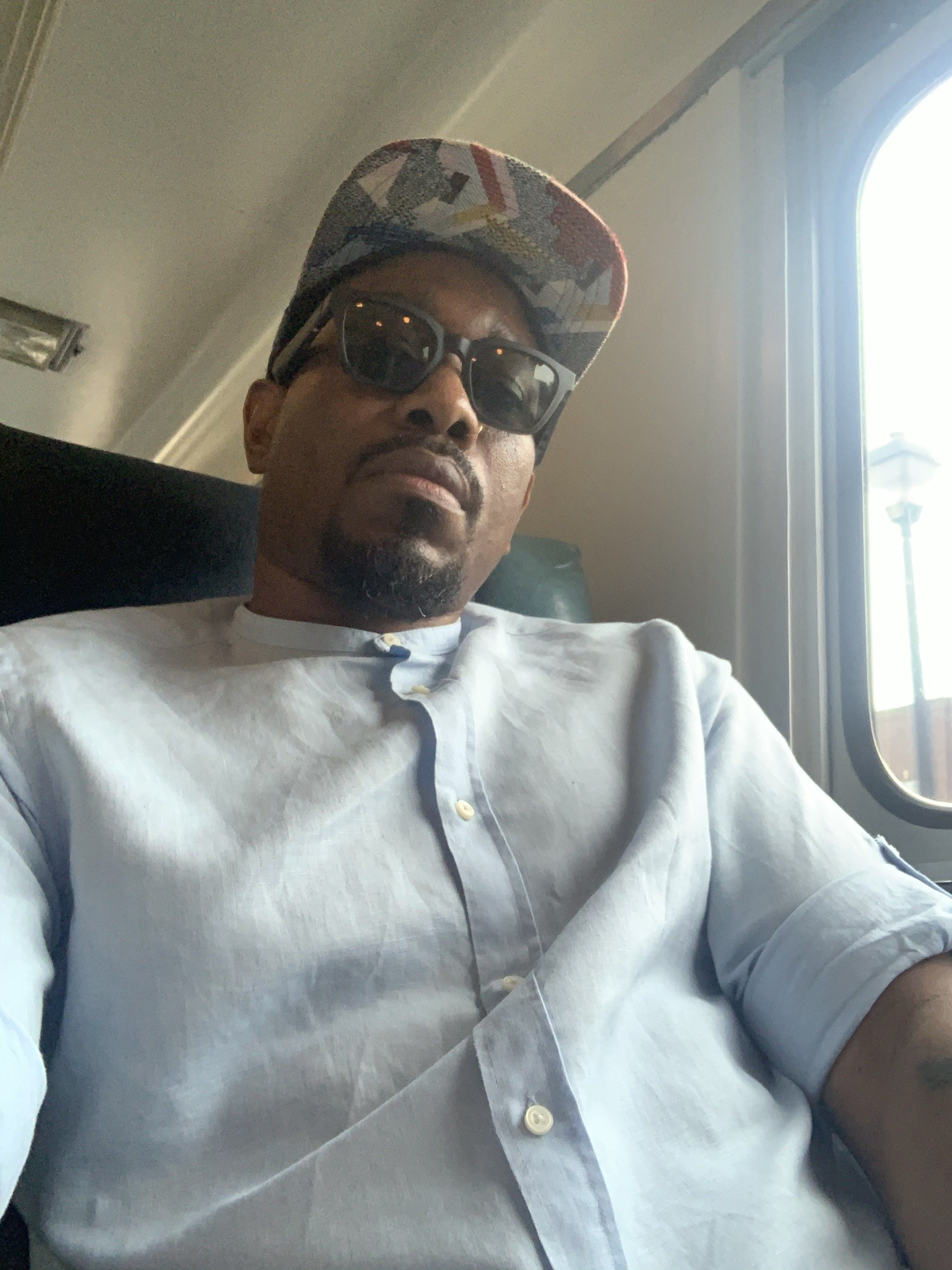
- David in 2023

Background information
- Born: Anthony David Harrington; December 4, 1971 (age 54); Savannah, Georgia, U.S.
- Genres: R&B; progressive soul
- Occupation: Singer-songwriter
- Instruments: Vocals, guitar
- Years active: 2004–present
- Labels: Brash, Universal, Purpose, E1
- Website: anthonydavidsound.com

Anthony David Harrington (born December 4, 1971) is an American R&B singer-songwriter. He is best known for his 2006 song "Words," a duet with contemporary R&B singer India.Arie.

== Biography ==
Anthony David was born in Savannah, Georgia. The Gulf War veteran began writing music while serving as a paratrooper with the 82nd Airborne and took part in 28 combat missions before moving to Atlanta to pursue a career in music. In Atlanta, he met R&B singer India.Arie, with whom he began collaborating. David's first song written for Arie was entitled "Part of My Life" for Arie's 7x Grammy nominated album Acoustic Soul. David also toured with Arie in support of her album.

In 2004, he released his first independent album Three Chords & The Truth. Then eventually in 2006, he released his second independent album The Red Clay Chronicles. After touring with Arie, David teamed up with her once again to co-write and produce "There's Hope" for Arie's third studio album. His third release, 2008's Acey Duecy, is a combination of both R&B and soul music. The album, featured the single "Words," a duet with Arie.

Anthony's fourth album, released on February 22, 2011, As Above So Below, was co-produced with Shannon Sanders and featured guest vocalists including Atlanta singer Algebra Blesset; rapper Phonte from Little Brother; and cousin Shawn Stockman of Boyz II Men. The first single from the album, "4Evermore" featuring Blessett and Phonte became David's first top 20 R&B hit in the US charts where it has peaked at #18. In 2018, he released Hello Like Before: The Songs of Bill Withers, which pays tribute to the late great Bill Withers. The album was produced by Eddie "Gypsy" Stokes.

== Discography ==
Year	Album
2004	Three Chords & the Truth
2006	The Red Clay Chronicles
2008	Acey Duecy
2011	As Above So Below
2012	Love Out Loud
2016	The Powerful Now
2018	Hello Like Before: The Songs of Bill Withers
2023	Heaven: The Best of Anthony David

=== Singles ===
- "Something About You" (2006)
- "Words" (2006) US R&B #53
- "4Evermore" (2011) US R&B #18
- "Let Me In" (2011)
- "Can't Look Down" (2012)
- "Sweet Pain" (2012)
- "Beautiful Problems" (2016)
- "Need You Now" – with Algebra Blessett (2023)

== Awards and nominations ==
- Grammy Award
  - 2009, Best R&B Performance by a Duo or Group with Vocals: "Words" (Nominated)
- NAACP Image Award
  - 2009, Outstanding New Artist (Nominated)
  - 2009, Outstanding Duo or Group/Collaboration (Nominated)
