= Video (song) =

Single by India Arie

from the album Acoustic Soul
- Written: 1999
- Released: February 6, 2001
- Genre: R&B
- Length: 4:09
- Label: Motown
- Songwriters: India.Arie; Carlos "6 July" Broady; Shannon Sanders
- Producer: Carlos "6 July" Broady

India Arie singles chronology
"Video" (2001)	"Brown Skin" (2001)

"Video" is the first single released by American singer-songwriter India Arie from her debut album, Acoustic Soul. The song contains a sample of "Fun" by Brick and a sample of "Top Billin'" by Audio Two. Arie wrote the hook for the song in October 1999. "Video" became India.Arie's most successful song on the Billboard Hot 100, entering the top 50. At 2002, "Video" was nominated for four Grammy Awards: Record of the Year, Song of the Year, Best Female R&B Vocal Performance, and Best R&B Song.

== Charts ==
=== Weekly charts ===
Weekly chart performance for "Video"
Chart (2001–2002)	Peak position
Netherlands (Dutch Top 40)	40
Netherlands (Single Top 100)	69
Scotland Singles (Official Charts)	52
UK Singles (Official Charts)	32
UK Hip Hop/R&B (Official Charts)	8
US Billboard Hot 100	47
US Hot R&B/Hip-Hop Songs (Billboard)	14
US Pop Airplay (Billboard)	22

=== Year-end charts ===
2001 year-end chart performance for "Video"
Chart (2001)	Position
UK Urban (Music Week)	16
US Hot R&B/Hip-Hop Singles & Tracks (Billboard)	55

2002 year-end chart performance for "Video"
Chart (2002)	Position
US Mainstream Top 40 (Billboard)	96

== Release history ==
Release dates and formats for "Video"
Region	Date	Format	Label	Ref.
United States	February 6, 2001	Urban contemporary radio; urban adult contemporary radio	Motown	
Australia	June 4, 2001	CD: CD1	Motown	
United Kingdom	June 18, 2001	CD; 12-inch vinyl; cassette	Motown	
Australia	October 1, 2001	CD: CD2		
United States	February 4, 2002	Adult contemporary radio; contemporary hit radio; hot adult contemporary radio		
