= Testimony: Vol. 1, Life & Relationship =

2006 studio album by India Arie

Studio album by India Arie
- Released: June 27, 2006
- Recorded: 2005–2006
- Genre: R&B
- Length: 59:48
- Label: Motown
- Producer: India Arie; Mark Batson; Branden Burch; Dru Castro; Doctah B Sirius AKA Courtney Branch; Jimmy "J-Rok" English; Jared Gosselin; Tony Harrington; John Howard III; Richard Johnson Jr.; Frank "Blame" Macek; Drew Ramsey; Shannon Sanders; Phillip White

India Arie chronology
| Voyage to India (2002) | Testimony: Vol. 1, Life & Relationship (2006) | Testimony: Vol. 2, Love & Politics (2009) |

Alternative cover
- UK cover

Singles from Testimony: Vol. 1, Life & Relationship
- 1. "I Am Not My Hair" Released: November 15, 2005; 2. "There's Hope" Released: June 26, 2006; 3. "The Heart of the Matter" Released: September 4, 2006

Testimony: Vol. 1, Life & Relationship is the third studio album by American singer India Arie, released on June 27, 2006, by Motown. The album debuted at number one on the Billboard 200, selling 161,000 copies in its first week.

In 2007, the album was nominated for three Grammy Awards: Best R&B Album, Best R&B Song for "I Am Not My Hair", and Best Female R&B Vocal Performance for "I Am Not My Hair".

== Critical reception ==
Professional ratings
Aggregate scores
| Source | Rating |
|---|---|
| Metacritic | 53/100 |
Review scores
| Source | Rating |
| AllMusic | 3.5/5 stars |
| Blender | 3/5 stars |
| Entertainment Weekly | B |
| The Guardian | 2/5 stars |
| NME | 4/10 |
| PopMatters | 6/10 |
| Rolling Stone | 2.5/5 stars |
| Spin | 4/10 |
| USA Today | 3.5/4 stars |
| Vibe | 3.5/5 marks |

Testimony: Vol. 1, Life & Relationship received mixed reviews from music critics. At Metacritic, which assigns a normalized rating out of 100 to reviews from mainstream publications, the album received an average score of 53, based on 14 reviews. Some reviews are positive, like Billboard, for example, which gave the album a positive review and called it "An ambitious, aurally rich suite of storytelling songs." Hartford Courant gave it a positive review and said, "Of all today's self-actualizing soul singers, India.Arie represents the purest version of the concept. How much you'll like her brand of R&B depends in part on whether the word "nurturing" gives you the warm fuzzies or makes your skin crawl." On the other hand, Mojo gave it two stars out of five and said, "Lacking the wit and lyrical dexterity of a Jill Scott or the raw power of Angie Stone, the songs can feel airless and unengaged." Q also gave it two stars out of five and said that Arie's "sauntering melodies struggle under the weight of their worthy load."

== Commercial performance ==
In the United States, Testimony: Vol. 1, Life & Relationship debuted at number one on the Billboard 200 and the Top R&B/Hip-Hop Albums charts with first-week sales of 161,000 copies, Arie's first number-one album on the Billboard 200 and second on the R&B chart. The following week, it fell to number three on the Billboard 200 with 69,000 copies sold. The album had sold 689,000 copies in the United States as of December 2008.

== Track listing ==
| No. | Title | Writer(s) | Producer(s) | Length |
|---|---|---|---|---|
| 1. | "Intro: Loving" | India Arie; Shannon Sanders | Arie; Sanders | 1:30 |
| 2. | "These Eyes" | Arie; Mark Batson; Joyce Simpson | Arie; Batson; Sanders^{[a]} | 4:31 |
| 3. | "The Heart of the Matter" | Donald Henley; Michael W. Campbell; John David Souther | Arie^{[b]}; Frank "Blame" Macek^{[b]} | 5:15 |
| 4. | "Good Morning" | Arie; Sanders; Drew Ramsey | Arie; Sanders; Ramsey | 5:27 |
| 5. | "Private Party" | Arie; Branden Burch; John Howard III; Richard Johnson Jr.; Stevie Wonder | Arie; Burch; Johnson; Howard | 3:52 |
| 6. | "There's Hope" | Arie; Tony Harrington; Burch | Arie; Harrington; Burch | 3:56 |
| 7. | "Interlude: Living" | Arie; Sanders | Arie; Sanders | 1:23 |
| 8. | "India'Song" | Arie | Arie; Doctah B Sirius AKA Courtney Branch | 5:26 |
| 9. | "Wings of Forgiveness" | Arie; Macek; Jared Gosselin; Phillip White | Arie; Macek; Gosselin; White | 4:59 |
| 10. | "Summer" (featuring Rascal Flatts and Victor Wooten) | Arie; Ramsey; Cindy Morgan | Arie; Ramsey; Sanders | 3:14 |
| 11. | "I Am Not My Hair" (featuring Akon) | Arie; Sanders; Ramsey; Aliaune Thaim | | 3:49 |
| 12. | "Great Grandmother" | | | 0:34 |
| 13. | "Better People" | Arie; Sanders; Ramsey; Macek; Jimmy "J-Rok" English | Arie; Macek; English | 3:43 |
| 14. | "Outro: Learning" | Arie; Sanders | Arie; Sanders | 1:32 |
| 15. | "I Choose" | Andrew Castro; Arie | Arie; Dru Castro | 4:45 |
| 16. | "This Too Shall Pass" (hidden track) | | | 5:54 |

UK edition bonus tracks
| No. | Title | Length |
|---|---|---|
| 16. | "I Am Not My Hair" (Urban A/C Mix) | 4:20 |
| 17. | "This Too Shall Pass" (hidden track) | 5:52 |

iTunes Store bonus tracks
| No. | Title | Length |
|---|---|---|
| 16. | "I Am Not My Hair" (Yoruba Soul Remix) |
| 17. | "This Too Shall Pass" | 5:52 |

Target exclusive edition bonus tracks
| No. | Title | Length |
|---|---|---|
| 16. | "Just for Today (Embrace the Mystery)" | 4:31 |
| 17. | "This Too Shall Pass" (hidden track) | 5:52 |

Circuit City exclusive edition bonus tracks
| No. | Title | Length |
|---|---|---|
| 16. | "Simple Yes" | 4:48 |
| 17. | "This Too Shall Pass" (hidden track) | 5:52 |

=== Notes ===
- ^{^[a]} signifies an additional producer
- ^{^[b]} signifies a main and vocal producer

== Charts ==
=== Weekly charts ===
Weekly chart performance for Testimony: Vol. 1, Life & Relationship
| Chart (2006) | Peak position |
|---|---|
| Australian Albums (ARIA) | 80 |
| Canadian Albums (Nielsen SoundScan) | 29 |
| Dutch Albums (Album Top 100) | 24 |
| French Albums (SNEP) | 141 |
| German Albums (Offizielle Top 100) | 58 |
| Italian Albums (FIMI) | 56 |
| Swiss Albums (Schweizer Hitparade) | 25 |
| UK Albums (OCC) | 103 |
| UK R&B Albums (OCC) | 13 |
| US Billboard 200 | 1 |
| US Top R&B/Hip-Hop Albums (Billboard) | 1 |

=== Year-end charts ===
Year-end chart performance for Testimony: Vol. 1, Life & Relationship
| Chart (2006) | Position |
|---|---|
| US Billboard 200 | 114 |
| US Top R&B/Hip-Hop Albums (Billboard) | 29 |

== Certifications ==
Certifications for Testimony: Vol. 1, Life & Relationship
| Region | Certification | Certified units/sales |
|---|---|---|
| United States (RIAA) | Gold | 500,000^{^} |
^{^} Shipments figures based on certification alone.
