= Acey Duecy =

Studio album by Anthony David
- Released: June 24, 2008
- Recorded: 2006–07
- Genre: R&B, soul
- Label: Universal Republic, Soulbird; 001144202
- Producer: Anthony David

Anthony David chronology
The Red Clay Chronicles (2006)	Acey Duecy (2008)

Professional ratings
Review scores
Source	Rating
Allmusic	4/5 stars

Acey Duecy is the third studio album by American R&B singer Anthony David, released on June 24, 2008, by Universal Republic and SoulBird.

== Track listing ==
1. "Stop Playin'" (A. Harrington, B. Burch, C. Johnson) — 3:47
2. "Something About You" (W. Badarou, P. Gould, R. Gould, M. King, M. Lindup) — 4:53
3. "Smoke One" (A. Harrington, B. Burch, O. Ferrer) — 4:05
4. "Words" (Featuring India.Arie) (A. Harrington, I. Simpson) — 4:01
5. "Lady" (Featuring Keisha Jackson) (A. Harrington, L. Jefferson) — 4:39
6. "Spittin' Game" (A. Harrington, L. Jefferson) — 4:13
7. "Kinfolk" (A. Harrington, B. Burch, C. Johnson, S. Sanders, C. Barnes) — 4:26
8. "GA Peach" (A. Harrington, N. Barnes, L. Jefferson) — 4:25
9. "Cheatin' Man" (A. Harrington, E. Stokes) — 4:42
10. "Cold Turkey" (A. Harrington, L. Jefferson) — 4:38
11. "Krooked Kop" (A. Harrington, L. Jefferson) — 4:58

== Personnel ==
- Anthony Bailey – horn
- Sandy Brummels – creative director
- Branden Burch – piano, keyboards, programming, producer, engineer, mixing
- Cekoya Renee Burch – vocals
- Anthony David – guitar, vocals, producer, engineer
- Omar Ferrer – programming
- Anthony Harrington – producer
- India.Arie – vocals
- Keisha Jackson – vocals
- LaMarquis Mark Jefferson – bass, percussion, drums, producer, engineer, mixing
- Vaughn Jefferson – upright bass
- Chris Johnson – bass, guitar, percussion, drums, keyboards, programming, producer
- Christopher Kornmann – art direction, design
- Jonathan Lloyd – horn
- Alex Lowe – producer, mixing
- Larry Nix – organ
- Billy Odum – guitar, soloist
- Anthony Papamichael – guitar
- Omar Phillips – percussion, drums
- Shannon Sanders – vocals
- Victor Smiley – guitar
- Ryan Waters – guitar

== Chart performance ==
The album peaked at No. 7 on the Billboard Top Heatseekers chart and No. 30 on the Billboard Top R&B/Hip-Hop Albums chart.

=== Chart positions ===
Chart (2008)	Peak position
US Billboard Top Heatseekers	7
US Billboard Top R&B/Hip-Hop Albums	30
