= Words (Anthony David song) =

Single by Anthony David featuring India.Arie

from the album Acey Duecy
- Released: June 2006
- Recorded: 2006
- Genre: R&B
- Length: 4:03
- Label: Universal Republic, Soulbird
- Songwriters: Anthony David, India.Arie

Anthony David singles chronology
"Something About You" (2006)	"Words" (2006)	"4Evermore" (2011)

"Words" is a song by American R&B singer-songwriter Anthony David, from his third studio album Acey Duecy. It features fellow contemporary R&B singer-songwriter India.Arie. The song peaked at #53 on the Billboard Hot R&B/Hip-Hop Songs chart, since its release. The song was also featured on the LOGO television series Noah's Arc season 2 in 2006. The song was nominated for a Best R&B Performance by a Duo or Group with Vocals in 2009.

== Charts ==
Chart (2006)	Peak position
U.S. Billboard Hot R&B/Hip-Hop Songs	53
