= Brown Skin =

Single by India.Arie

from the album Acoustic Soul
- Released: June 12, 2001
- Recorded: 2000
- Genre: R&B; neo soul
- Length: 4:56
- Label: Motown
- Songwriters: India.Arie; Mark Batson; Shannon Sanders
- Producers: Mark Batson; Carlos "6 July" Broady

India.Arie singles chronology
"Video" (2001)	"Brown Skin" (2001)	"Little Things" (2002)

"Brown Skin" is the second single by American soul and R&B singer-songwriter India.Arie from her debut studio album Acoustic Soul in 2001. The single failed to chart on the Billboard Hot 100, but it became her highest charting single in the United Kingdom, peaking at number 29.

== CD single track listing ==
1. "Brown Skin" (E-London Radio Mix) – 4:04
2. "Brown Skin" (E-London Club Mix) – 8:29
3. "Brown Skin" (E-London Instrumental) – 8:28
4. "Brown Skin" (illicit Radio Mix) – 3:57
5. "Brown Skin" (Illicit Club Mix) – 8:24
6. "Brown Skin" (Illicit Instrumental) – 8:24

== Charts ==
Chart (2001)	Peak position
Australian Singles Chart	95
Dutch Singles Chart	88
UK Singles Chart	29
U.S. Billboard Bubbling Under Hot 100	109
U.S. Billboard Hot R&B/Hip-Hop Songs	39

== Release history ==
Release dates and formats for "Brown Skin"
Region	Date	Format	Label	Ref.
United States	June 12, 2001	Rhythmic contemporary radio; urban contemporary radio; urban adult contemporary radio	Motown	
United Kingdom	October 1, 2001	CD single; 12-inch vinyl	Motown	
