= Christmas with Friends (India.Arie and Joe Sample album) =

Studio album by India.Arie and Joe Sample
- Released: October 16, 2015
- Studio: Various (See background and recording section)
- Genres: Christmas; pop; R&B
- Length: 36:20
- Labels: Motown, Soulbird Music
- Producers: India.Arie (exec.); John Burk (exec.); Dave Koz (exec.)

India.Arie chronology
| Songversation (2013) | Christmas with Friends (2015) | SongVersation: Medicine (2017) |

Joe Sample chronology
| Live (2012) | Christmas with Friends (2015) |

Christmas with Friends is a collaborative Christmas album by American singer India.Arie and American pianist Joe Sample. It was released on October 16, 2015, through Motown and Soulbird Music. Arie worked as one of the album's executive producers with American pianist John Burk and American musician Dave Koz. Sample contributed to four of the songs, but died from mesothelioma before the album's completion. After placing the project on hold for a year, Arie decided to collaborate with other artists to complete it.

Christmas with Friends consists of ten tracks, including nine covers of Christmas standards and carols, and one original song co-written by Arie's mother. Following the album's release, Arie promoted it in various venues, particularly through her Christmas with Friends Tour (2015). Christmas with Friends received a generally mixed critical reception. The album appeared on several Billboard charts. The album peaked at number 107 on the Billboard 200.

== Background and recording ==
American singer-songwriter India.Arie and American pianist Joe Sample first met in 2012 during the Curaçao Jazz Festival. They worked together on music without much success; Arie said she was dissatisfied with their earlier work, explaining the songs "weren't coming together as quickly as I wanted". After attempting to collaborate on new music for two years, they decided to record a Christmas album together. Both artists had been asked by their families to make a Christmas album in the past.

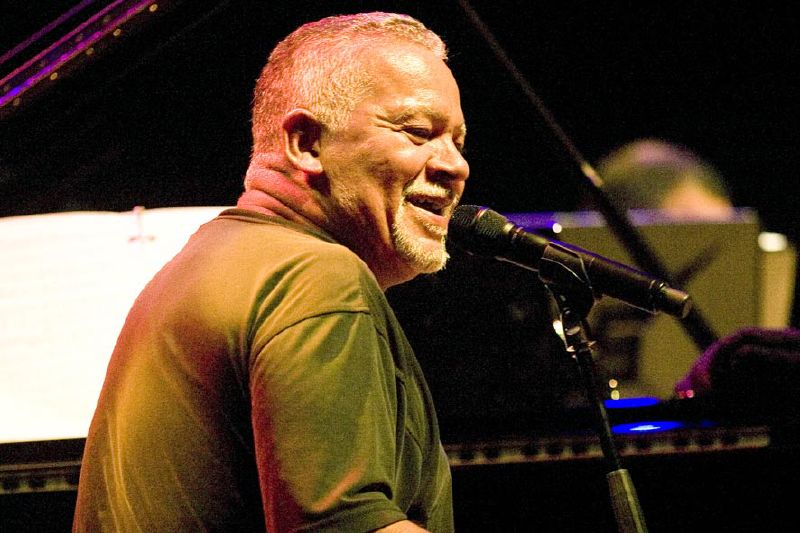
Christmas with Friends was the final album Joe Sample (pictured in 2008) worked on before his death in 2014.

Arie and Sample began working on Christmas with Friends in February 2014, with help from American producer Aaron Lindsey. Recording took place in a number of studios, including Harmony Studios, House of Blues Studios, Ocean Way Recording, and Sound Logic Recording Studio in California, India Song Studio in Georgia, Studio A Recording Inc. in Maryland, and Wire Roads Studio in Texas. Arie was one of the album's executive producers with American pianist John Burke and American musician Dave Koz.

Sample died from mesothelioma on September 12, 2014, before completing his parts for the album. When discussing her experience working with Sample in Houston, Arie said: "He was an older person who was dealing with health issues, but he was fun to be around." She dedicated Christmas with Friends to Sample with a message on the liner notes. (Note: Arie included the following message in the liner notes: "Joe said, 'Recording should be a moment. The best records are where a group of musicians are sharing an experience together.' And we had that.")

Following Sample's death, Arie put work on Christmas with Friends on hold for a year, after which she decided to contact multiple singers to complete the project. The artists who appear on the album are Kem, Brandy, Michael McDonald, Dave Koz, Tori Kelly, and Trombone Shorty. (Note: A feature with American musician Stevie Wonder was also planned, but was never finished.) Describing the process she used to pair songs with potential collaborators, Arie said: "I sent several songs to each person and said 'do what you feel'". Brandy had approached Arie when the album was nearly complete and said: "It ain't done until I'm on there! I need to be on 'Silent Night.'"

== Composition and collaborations ==
"Let It Snow"
A sample of India.Arie rendition of "Let It Snow", featuring Joe Sample on the piano. Arie said that Sample's chord voicings influenced her vocals on the album.

Christmas with Friends comprises ten songs, nine of which are covers of Christmas standards and one is an original track. SoulTracks' Melody Charles viewed the track listing as "leisurely-paced". The midtempo "Favorite Time of Year" is the album's only original song. It was co-written by Arie's mother during a session in the recording studio with her daughter and Aaron Lindsey, and includes lyrics about Arie's family, such as how her mother created her stage clothing. She chose to cover "Merry Christmas Baby" as her grandmother had previously sung to her during her childhood.

Sample plays the piano on four of the album's songs: "Let It Snow", "Have Yourself a Merry Little Christmas", "Silent Night", and "The Christmas Song". Arie said that Sample's chord voicings had a deep impact on her approach for her vocals; she explained: "His piano playing was so nuanced and delicate, it made me want to sing in a way that would complement his aesthetic."

Music critics noted that the singers came from different artistic backgrounds, such as gospel, jazz, pop, contemporary R&B, soul, and rock. Francois Marchand of The Vancouver Sun identified the album's genre as "relaxed pop [and] R&B." Charles wrote that "Let It Snow" features "Sample's glib piano work and her feathery croon" and "The Christmas Song" as a "smoke-infused ditty". Arie's interpretations of "I've Got My Love to Keep Me Warm" and "Merry Christmas Baby" contain elements of ragtime and blues respectively. Her versions of "Let It Snow" and "God Rest You Merry, Gentlemen" incorporate a jazz sound, while her take on "Auld Lang Syne" includes an instrumental from American saxophonist Kirk Whalum.

== Release and promotion ==
Christmas with Friends was released on October 16, 2015, through Motown and Soulbird Music. It was Arie's second studio album after a four-year hiatus. In a 2015 interview with Ebony, she said that it would be her only Christmas album. Christmas with Friends was Sample's final album before his death; when talking about her part in his career, Arie said: "It's an honor to be the gatekeeper to what we believe is his last recorded work."

Arie promoted the album by performing in a concert as part of the Hollywood Christmas Parade on December 11, 2015. She also embarked on the Christmas with Friends Tour (2015). The seven-city production started in Boston on December 13, 2015, with American musician Jonathan McReynolds serving as the opening act for five of its dates. A portion of the ticket sales was given to the National Museum of African-American Music. To promote the record further, Arie also appeared on The Steve Harvey Morning Show and Tavis Smiley in December 2015.

== Reception ==
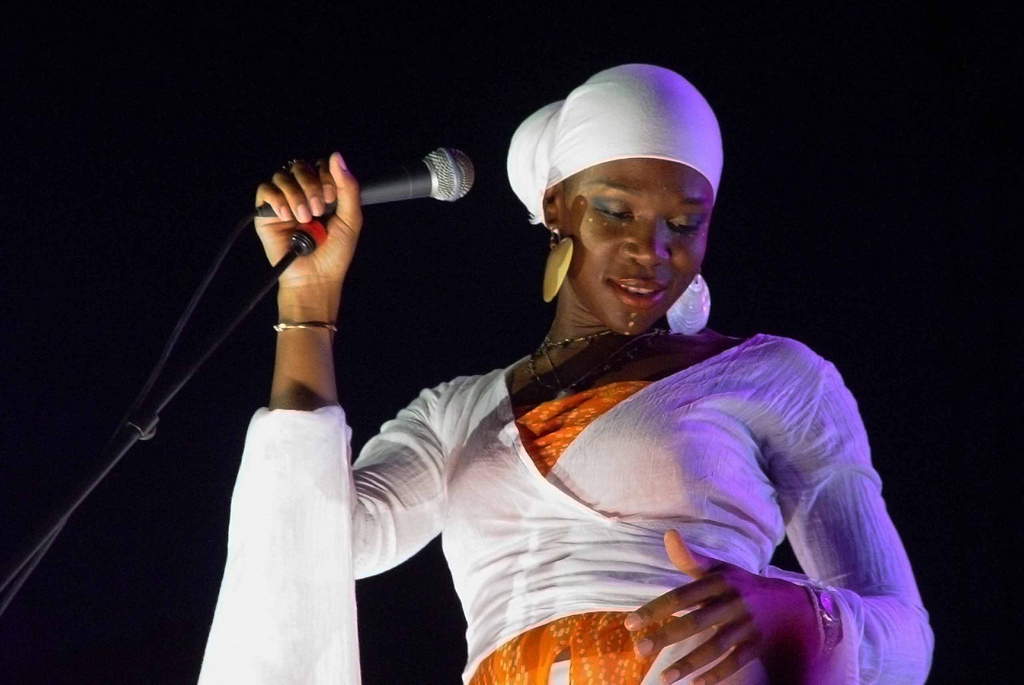
Some critics praised India.Arie (pictured in 2004) for her vocals on the album.

Upon its release, Christmas with Friends received positive feedback from music critics. Praising Arie's performance as "show[ing] a smooth maturity", The Southern Illinoisan's Pablo Gorondi wrote that Sample lent the album a "jazz expertise". Sean L. Maloney of the Nashville Scene summed up the record as "a great big bundle of warm-and-fuzzies, a cozy cuddle by the fireplace on a cold night, and a holiday tradition in the makin". Philadelphia Weekly's Nerisha Penrose viewed it as composed of "nostalgic numbers that will warm listeners['] ears and hearts". The Los Angeles Times' Randy Lewis described Christmas with Friends as "suitably warm", and Alan Sculley of the Daily Herald wrote that it showcased the potential for a Christmas album to be original.

Other critics had more mixed responses to the album. Despite wishing that Sample was featured on more songs, Andy Kellman of AllMusic praised the contributions from its various featured artists. He highlighted Arie's vocals "switching between the spiritual and playful material with natural ease", writing that she provides cohesion for all of the tracks. While she believed that the album needed more uptempo tracks, Melody Charles responded positively to Arie's vocals and her collaborations with the other artists. She wrote that the album "gift[ed] music lovers with a treat to the ears, and heart, long before that celebrated day arrives". Joe Szczechowski of Digital First Media praised Arie's approach to the album's various genres, but he criticized her tendency to rely on "runs and other vocal gymnastics when the song would be best served by simply carrying the tune".

Christmas with Friends reached a peak position on several Billboard charts for the week of December 26, 2015. It peaked at number 107 on the Billboard 200, and remained on the chart for four weeks. It reached number 78 on the Top Album Sales chart, and stayed on the chart for two weeks. The album peaked at number 19 on the Holiday Album Sales chart, and remained on the chart for a total of six weeks. Along with the album, Arie's cover of "Merry Christmas Baby" peaked at number 28 on the Billboard Hot 100 on January 9, 2016, and remained on the chart for one week.

== Track listing ==
Credits adapted from AllMusic.

| No. | Title | Writer(s) | Producer(s) | Length |
|---|---|---|---|---|
| 1. | "Let It Snow" | Jule Styne; Sammy Cahn | Aaron W. Lindsay; India.Arie | 2:34 |
| 2. | "Favorite Time of Year" (featuring Tori Kelly) | India Arie Simpson; Lindsay; Joyce Simpson | Lindsay; India.Arie; Joe Sample | 3:01 |
| 3. | "Silent Night" (featuring Brandy) | Joseph Mohr; Franz Xaver Gruber | Lindsay; India.Arie; Sample | 3:40 |
| 4. | "Have Yourself a Merry Little Christmas" (featuring Kem) | Ralph Blane; Hugh Martin | Lindsay; India.Arie; Sample | 4:35 |
| 5. | "Merry Christmas Baby" (featuring Michael McDonald) | Johnny Moore; Lou Baxter | Lindsay; India.Arie | 3:34 |
| 6. | "I've Got My Love to Keep Me Warm" (featuring Dave Koz and Trombone Shorty) | Irving Berlin | Rickey Minor | 3:10 |
| 7. | "The Christmas Song" | Robert Wells; Mel Tormé | Lindsay; India.Arie; Sample | 4:23 |
| 8. | "God Rest Ye Merry Gentlemen" (featuring Khristian Dentley) | Traditional | Lindsay; India.Arie | 4:19 |
| 9. | "Mary, Did You Know?" (featuring Gene Moore Jr.) | Buddy Greene; Mark Lowry | Lindsay | 3:23 |
| 10. | "Auld Lang Syne" (featuring Kirk Whalum) | Traditional | Lindsay; India.Arie | 3:41 |
| Total length: | | | | 36:20 |

== Credits and personnel ==
Credits adapted from AllMusic.

Management

- Motown
- Soulbird Music

Recording locations

- Harmony Studios (West Hollywood, California)
- House of Blues Studios (Encino, California)
- Ocean Way Recording (Hollywood, California)
- Sound Logic Recording Studio (Santa Barbara, California)
- India Song Studio (Atlanta, Georgia)
- Studio A Recording, Inc (Dearborn Heights, Michigan)
- Wire Roads Studio (Houston, Texas)

Credits

Musicians and Singers

- India.Arie – vocals
- Joe Sample – acoustic piano (1, 3, 4, 7), arrangements (1, 3, 4, 7)
- Aaron W. Lindsey – auxiliary keyboards (1, 3, 7), synthesizers (1, 3, 7), instruments (2), bass (3, 4), arrangements (3–5, 8–10), Rhodes electric piano (4), additional keyboards (4), upright bass (4), drums (4), acoustic piano (5, 8–10), keyboards (8–10)
- John Beasley – acoustic piano (6), arrangements (6)
- David Delhomme – keyboards (6)
- Paul Jackson Jr. – acoustic guitar (6, 9), electric guitar (9)
- Nicklas Sample – upright bass (1, 7)
- Nathan East – bass (4, 8), upright bass (9, 10)
- Chuck Berghofer – bass (6)
- Jeff "Tain" Watts – drums (1, 3, 7)
- Teddy Campbell – drums (5, 6, 8–10)
- Javier Solís – percussion (1, 3, 7, 8)
- Craig Fundyga – vibraphone (6)
- Dave Koz – tenor saxophone (6)
- Kirk Whalum – tenor saxophone (10)
- Troy "Trombone Shorty" Andrews – trombone (6)
- John Stoddart – strings (4, 9), string arrangements (4, 9)
- Hamilton Hardin – horns (5), horn arrangements (5)
- Rickey Minor – arrangements (6)
- Tori Kelly – vocals (2)
- Brandy – vocals (3)
- Kem – vocals (4)
- Michael McDonald – vocals (5)
- Khristian Dentley – vocals (8), vocal arrangements (8)
- Gene Moore – vocals (9)

Production and Technical

- Rex Rideout – A&R
- India.Arie – executive producer
- John Burk – executive producer (6)
- Dave Koz – executive producer (6)
- Case Mundy – recording (1, 3, 4, 7)
- Rob Skipworth – vocal recording (1, 3, 4, 7), recording (4, 6)
- Paul "Salvo" Salveson – mixing (1–5, 7–10)
- Aaron W. Lindsey – editing (1, 3, 7), recording (2), vocal recording (9)
- Kory Aaron – vocal recording for India.Arie (2)
- Matt Emonson – vocal recording for Tori Kelly (2)
- Timothy "Tip" Wyman – vocal recording for Brandy (3)
- Eric Morgeson – vocal recording for Kem (4)
- Danny Duncan – recording (5, 8–10)
- Mark Casselman – vocal recording for Michael McDonald (5)
- Allen Sides – recording (6), mixing (6)
- Gerrit Kinkel – additional recording (6)
- Seth Presant – assistant engineer (6)
- Ryan Staples – assistant engineer (6)
- Lenny Wee – assistant engineer (6)
- Reuben Cohen – mastering
- Steve Cook – A&R administrator
- Vivian Yohannes – A&R coordinator
- Annalee Valencia-Bruch – art direction, design
- Queen Cora Dunham – photography

== Charts ==
| Chart (2015) | Peak position |
|---|---|
| Billboard Contemporary Jazz Albums | 1 |
| Billboard Jazz Albums | 2 |
| Billboard Top R&B Albums | 7 |
| Billboard Top R&B/Hip-Hop Albums | 12 |
| Holiday Album Sales (Billboard) | 19 |
| Top Album Sales (Billboard) | 78 |
| Billboard 200 | 107 |

== Release history ==
| Country | Date | Format | Label | Ref. |
|---|---|---|---|---|
| United States | October 16, 2015 | CD; digital download | Motown, Soulbird Music | |
