= Acoustic Soul =

2001 studio album by India Arie

Studio album by India Arie
- Released: March 27, 2001
- Recorded: 2000–2001
- Studio: Various: Electric Lady (New York City) (Note: Tracks 1, 5, 9 and 15); Sound Kitchen (Franklin, Tennessee) (Note: Track 2); Music Mill (Nashville, Tennessee) (Note: Tracks 3 and 7); Access (Atlanta, Georgia) (Note: Tracks 4–6, 12, 13 and 16); Blues House (Note: Tracks 7, 8 and 14; vocals on track 11); New Reflections (Nashville, Tennessee) (Note: Tracks 8 and 11); The Studio (Philadelphia, Pennsylvania) (Note: Strings on track 10); Worldbeat (Note: Track 10); Battery (New York City)
- Genre: R&B
- Length: 61:16
- Label: Motown
- Producers: India Arie; Mark Batson; Carlos "6 July" Broady; Blue Miller; Bob Power

India Arie chronology
Acoustic Soul (2001)	Voyage to India (2002)

Singles from Acoustic Soul
- 1. "Video" Released: February 6, 2001; 2. "Brown Skin" Released: June 11, 2001; 3. "Strength, Courage & Wisdom" Released: October 16, 2001; 4. "Ready for Love" Released: 2002

Acoustic Soul is the debut studio album by American singer India Arie. It was released on March 27, 2001, by Motown. The album received seven nominations at the 44th Grammy Awards, including Album of the Year and Best R&B Album. Acoustic Soul was certified double platinum by the Recording Industry Association of America (RIAA) on December 17, 2003, denoting shipments in excess of two million copies in the United States.

== Critical reception ==
Upon its release, the album received acclaim from music critics.

Professional ratings
Review scores
Source	Rating
AllMusic	4.5/5 stars
Billboard	Favorable
Entertainment Weekly	A
Mixmag	4/5 stars
NME	9/10
PopMatters	Favorable
Rolling Stone	3.5/5 stars
The Rolling Stone Album Guide	3.5/5 stars
USA Today	3/4 stars
The Village Voice	Mixed

== Track listing ==
No.	Title	Writer(s)	Producer(s)	Length
1.	"Intro"	India Arie		0:50
2.	"Video"	Arie; Shannon Sanders; Carlos Broady	Carlos "6 July" Broady; Arie	4:09
3.	"Promises"	Arie; Blue Miller	Miller; Arie	4:37
4.	"Brown Skin"	Arie; Sanders; Mark Batson	Batson; Arie	4:56
5.	"Strength, Courage & Wisdom"	Arie	Batson; Arie	4:57
6.	"Nature"	Arie; Batson	Batson; Arie	4:24
7.	"Back to the Middle"	Arie; Miller	Miller; Arie	5:11
8.	"Ready for Love"	Arie; Miller	Miller; Arie	4:28
9.	"Interlude"	Arie		1:24
10.	"Always in My Head"	Arie; Miller	Bob Power; Arie	4:40
11.	"I See God in You"	Arie	Broady; Arie	3:17
12.	"Simple"	Arie; The Unit; Batson	Batson; Arie	3:26
13.	"Part of My Life"	Tony Harrington	Batson; Arie	4:03
14.	"Beautiful"	Arie; Kerisha Hicks; Miller	Miller; Arie	4:05
15.	"Outro"	Arie		1:18
16.	"Wonderful (Stevie Wonder Dedication)" (bonus track)	Arie; Cornelius Barnes; Batson	Batson; Arie	5:31

Japanese edition bonus track
No.	Title	Length
17.	"Butterfly"	4:07

UK edition bonus tracks
No.	Title	Length
17.	"Strength, Courage & Wisdom" (live)	5:57
18.	"Brown Skin" (Bedroom Rockers Remix)	3:36

Special edition bonus disc
No.	Title	Length
1.	"Video" (DJ Dodge Remix)
2.	"Video" (Urban Wolves/Dream Team Remix (featuring Super Cat))
3.	"Brown Skin" (Bedroom Rockers Radio Remix)
4.	"Brown Skin" (E-London Club Remix)
5.	"Brown Skin" (Mind Trap Mix)
6.	"Strength, Courage & Wisdom" (Remix)
7.	"Strength, Courage & Wisdom" (live from Paradiso)

Sample credits

- "Video" contains an interpolation of "Fun" by Brick.
- "Nature" contains an interpolation of "Quiet Storm" by Mobb Deep.

== Personnel ==
=== Musicians ===
- India Arie – vocals, acoustic guitar
- Mark Batson – organ, synthesizer, bass, percussion, drums, keyboards, programming, Mellotron, Fender Rhodes
- Carlos "6 July" Broady – programming
- John Catchings – cello
- Larry Goldings – organ, Wurlitzer, string contractor
- Steve Grossman – percussion, drums
- Tony Harrell – keyboards
- Kerisha Hicks – background vocals
- Judeth Insel – viola
- Avery Johnson – bass
- Bashiri Johnson – percussion
- Doug Kahan – bass
- Terry MacMillan – percussion
- Blue Miller – acoustic guitar, guitar, electric guitar, programming, vocals, background vocals
- Bob Power – bass, guitar, conductor, programming
- Marlene Rice – violin
- Ralph Rolle – drums
- Joyce Simpson – background vocals
- David Spak – percussion
- Laurneá Wilkerson – background vocals
- Nioka Workman – cello

=== Technical ===
- Producers: India Arie, Mark Batson, Carlos "6 July" Broady, Blue Miller, Bob Power
- Executive producer: Kedar Massenburg
- Engineers: Kevin Haywood, Avery Johnson, Jim Lightman, Blue Miller, Mark Niemiec, Bob Power, Larry Phillabaum, Lovis Scalise, Mike Tocci
- Mixing: Kevin Haywood, George Karras, Jim Lightman, Chris Mazer, Blue Miller, Bob Power, Mike Shipley, Alvin Speights, Dave Way
- Mastering: Chris Athens
- Programming: Mark Batson
- Assistant producer: Jason Breckling
- String arrangements: Mark Batson
- String engineer: Jon Smeltz
- Creative director: Sandy Brummels
- Product manager: Liz Loblack
- Art direction: Annalee Valencia
- Design: Annalee Valencia
- Photography: Kwaku Alston, Michael Benabib

== Charts ==
=== Weekly charts ===
Weekly chart performance for Acoustic Soul
Chart (2001–2002)	Peak position
Australian Albums (ARIA)	36
Australian Urban Albums (ARIA)	4
Canadian Albums (Nielsen SoundScan)	21
Canadian R&B Albums (Nielsen SoundScan)	9
Dutch Albums (Album Top 100)	48
European Albums (Eurotipsheet)	98
German Albums (Offizielle Top 100)	50
New Zealand Albums (RMNZ)	19
Swedish Albums (Sverigetopplistan)	43
Swiss Albums (Schweizer Hitparade)	85
UK Albums (Official Charts)	55
UK R&B Albums (Official Charts)	10
US Billboard 200	10
US Top R&B/Hip-Hop Albums (Billboard)	3

=== Year-end charts ===
2001 year-end chart performance for Acoustic Soul
Chart (2001)	Position
Canadian Albums (Nielsen SoundScan)	95
Canadian R&B Albums (Nielsen SoundScan)	22
US Billboard 200	97
US Top R&B/Hip-Hop Albums (Billboard)	39

2002 year-end chart performance for Acoustic Soul
Chart (2002)	Position
Australian Urban Albums (ARIA)	19
Canadian Albums (Nielsen SoundScan)	136
Canadian R&B Albums (Nielsen SoundScan)	26
US Billboard 200	96
US Top R&B/Hip-Hop Albums (Billboard)	49

== Certifications ==
Certifications for Acoustic Soul
Region	Certification	Certified units/sales
South Africa (RISA)	Gold	25,000^{*}
United States (RIAA)	2× Platinum	1,860,000
^{*} Sales figures based on certification alone.

== Release history ==
Release history for Acoustic Soul
Region	Date	Format
United States	March 27, 2001	CD
United Kingdom	October 22, 2001	CD
Japan	December 11, 2001	CD
United States	July 17, 2007	CD (special edition)
