= Testimony: Vol. 2, Love & Politics =

Studio album by India.Arie
- Released: February 10, 2009
- Recorded: 2007–2008
- Genre: R&B
- Length: 52:55
- Labels: Soulbird; Universal Republic
- Producers: India.Arie; Dru Castro; Robin Roberts; Nick Trevisick; Jared Gosselin

India.Arie chronology
Testimony: Vol. 1, Life & Relationship (2006)	Testimony: Vol. 2, Love & Politics (2009)	Songversation (2013)

Professional ratings
Aggregate scores
Source	Rating
Metacritic	(73/100)
Review scores
Source	Rating
About.com	4/5 stars
Allmusic	3.5/5 stars
Baltimore Sun	3/4 stars
Billboard	(favorable)
The Boston Globe	(positive)
Entertainment Weekly	C+
New York Times	(favorable)
Newsday	A−
People	3.5/4 stars
PopMatters	(7/10)
Robert Christgau	(1-star Honorable Mention)
Vibe	4/5 stars

Testimony: Vol. 2, Love & Politics is the fourth studio album by American singer India.Arie, released February 10, 2009 on Universal Republic Records. The album debuted as "Hot Shot" on the Billboard 200 in the week of February 28, 2009 at #3, selling in its first week around 76,000 copies, almost half less than her previous album in 2006. The next week it fell to number 7, selling another 32,000 copies.

== Background ==
Speaking about the album to writer Pete Lewis of Blues & Soul in April 2009, India stated;

"What this album represents is me finally being my real self. You know, there'd been things I'd always wanted to say that I'd previously shied away from because they were too political, or too whatever... And I now realised that I had to let go of all those concerns and do exactly what I WANTED to do. Which is why 'Testimony Vol 2' sounds like it's exploring new territory to anyone who's familiar with my previous albums. Whereas all I'm actually doing is being more MYSELF than people have ever heard me be before."

== Commercial performance ==
The album debuted as "Hot Shot" on the Billboard 200 in the week of February 28, 2009 at number three, selling in its first week around 76,000 copies, almost half less than her previous album in 2006. The next week it fell to number 7, selling another 32,000 copies. The album has sold 331,000 copies on U.S to date.

The single "Chocolate High" went for adds at U.S. urban adult contemporary radio the week of November 28, 2008. That single as well as its follow-up, "Therapy", were both released to iTunes in the U.S. on December 16, 2008.

== Track listing ==
No.	Title	Length
1.	"Intro: Grains" (India.Arie, Branden Burch)	0:48
2.	"Therapy" (Arie, Alonzo Stevenson, Marshall Leathers; featuring Gramps Morgan)	3:58
3.	"Ghetto" (Arie, Shannon Sanders, Drew Ramsey)	3:13
4.	"Chocolate High" (Arie, Andrew Castro, Musiq Soulchild; featuring Musiq Soulchild)	4:44
5.	"He Heals Me" (Arie)	4:59
6.	"Interlude: Grains" (Arie, Burch)	0:55
7.	"Pearls" (Sade Adu, Andrew Hale; featuring Dobet Gnahore)	4:23
8.	"River Rise" (Arie, Michael Ruff)	3:57
9.	"Yellow" (Arie, Shannon Sanders, Drew Ramsey; featuring Terrell Carter)	2:56
10.	"Better Way" (Arie, Cornelius Barnes, Rachelle Ferrell; featuring Keb' Mo')	3:30
11.	"Interlude: Grains" (Arie, Burch)	1:06
12.	"Long Goodbye" (Arie, Joyce Simpson, Nick Trevisick)	4:05
13.	"Psalms 23" (Arie, Castro, Jared Lee Gosselin, Phillip White, Lana Michelle Moorer; featuring MC Lyte)	5:15
14.	"The Cure" (Arie, Sezen Aksu; featuring Sezen Aksu)	4:41
15.	"Outro: Grains" (Arie, Burch)	0:33
16.	"A Beautiful Day" (Arie, Robin Roberts, Joyce Simpson, Nick Trevisick)	3:51

== Charts ==
=== Weekly charts ===
Chart (2009)	Peak position
Dutch Albums (Album Top 100)	53
Swiss Albums (Schweizer Hitparade)	44
US Billboard 200	3
US Top R&B/Hip-Hop Albums (Billboard)	2

=== Year-end charts ===
Chart (2009)	Position
US Billboard 200	126
US Top R&B/Hip-Hop Albums (Billboard)	32
