= I Am Not My Hair =

Single by India.Arie

from the album Testimony: Vol. 1, Life & Relationship
- Released: November 15, 2005
- Recorded: 2005
- Genre: R&B; soul
- Length: 3:49
- Label: Motown
- Songwriters: India Arie Simpson; Shannon Sanders; Drew Ramsey; Aliaune Thiam
- Producer: Drew and Shannon

India.Arie singles chronology
| "Purify Me" (2005) | "I Am Not My Hair" (2005) | "There's Hope" (2006) |

Akon singles chronology
| "Snitch" (2006) | ""I Am Not My Hair" (Konvict Remix)" (2006) | "Girls" (2006) |

"I Am Not My Hair" is a song by American soul and R&B singer–songwriter India.Arie from her third studio album, Testimony: Vol. 1, Life & Relationship (2006). Written by Arie, Shannon Sanders, and Drew Ramsey, it was released as the album's lead single in late 2005 to moderate chart success. The song was nominated for Best Female R&B Vocal Performance and Best R&B Song at the 2007 Grammy Awards. A remix version of "I Am Not My Hair" featuring Akon was also released.

== Song information and release ==
The song's original version with only Arie singing featured acoustic guitar and prominent bass over a midtempo drum track. This version was released digitally on November 15, 2005, through online music services such as iTunes, Rhapsody, and Amazon.com, followed by the CD single release on December 6, 2005. "I Am Not My Hair" was the most successful release from Testimony: Vol. 1, Life & Relationship, being the only single to chart on the U.S. Billboard Hot 100 and the UK Singles Chart, peaking at numbers ninety-seven and sixty-five, respectively.

A remix featuring Senegalese-American singer Akon, entitled Konvict Remix, was released to U.S. rhythmic and urban radio formats on April 3, 2006, and later to iTunes on June 20, 2006. The song's music video, directed by Barnaby Roper, used this remix. Akon's writing credit was added with the release of the remix. The remix was added on later editions of the album, replacing the original version.

On the April 16, 2007 episode of The Oprah Winfrey Show, Arie stated that her record label insisted that Akon be added to the single to make the song more mainstream. She said that she did not want Akon to be featured on the song, without mentioning his name.

According to Arie, the original version of "I Am Not My Hair" was a duet with pop rock singer Pink. The song's original concept originated from Pink's decision to do away with her pink locks, while the last verse was written after Arie watched Melissa Etheridge's performance at the 2005 Grammy Awards, where she appeared bald from chemotherapy to treat breast cancer. This version was made available on iTunes on October 17, 2006, and was used in the Lifetime television film Why I Wore Lipstick to My Mastectomy, which premiered on October 23, 2006.

== Music video ==
A music video was produced to promote the single. The video was directed by Barnaby Roper and used the Konvict Remix of the song.

== Track listings ==
U.S. CD single and digital single

1. "I Am Not My Hair" – 3:49

U.S. promo CD single

1. "I Am Not My Hair" (Konvict Remix featuring Akon) – 3:52
2. "I Am Not My Hair" (Swizz Beatz Remix featuring Swizz Beatz) – 4:09
3. "I Am Not My Hair" (Wiggedout Radio Edit) – 3:58
4. "I Am Not My Hair" (Konvict Remix w/o Akon) – 3:21

UK CD single and digital EP

1. "I Am Not My Hair" (Konvict Remix featuring Akon) – 3:52
2. "I Am Not My Hair" (Swizz Beatz Remix featuring Swizz Beatz) – 3:36
3. "I Am Not My Hair" (Wiggedout Remix) – 7:18
4. "I Am Not My Hair" (Yoruba Soul Remix) – 3:28

UK digital single

1. "I Am Not My Hair" (Konvict Remix featuring Akon) – 3:52

UK 12" single

1. "I Am Not My Hair" (Konvict Remix featuring Akon) – 3:52
2. "I Am Not My Hair" (Swizz Beatz Remix featuring Swizz Beatz) – 3:36
3. "I Am Not My Hair" (Jazze Pha Remix) – 4:02
4. "I Am Not My Hair" (Wiggedout Remix) – 7:18
5. "I Am Not My Hair" (Yoruba Soul Remix) – 3:28

== Official versions ==
- Album Version – 3:49
- Konvict Remix featuring Akon – 3:52
- Konvict Remix w/o Akon – 3:21
- Swizz Beatz Remix featuring Swizz Beatz – 3:36
- Wiggedout Remix – 7:18
- Wiggedout Radio Edit – 3:58
- Jazze Pha Remix – 4:02
- Yoruba Soul Remix – 3:28
- Remix featuring Pink – 3:45

== Charts ==
=== Weekly charts ===
| Chart (2006) | Peak position |
|---|---|
| Hungary (Rádiós Top 40) | 13 |
| Scotland Singles (OCC) | 92 |
| UK Singles (OCC) | 65 |
| UK Hip Hop/R&B (OCC) | 10 |
| US Billboard Hot 100 | 97 |
| US Dance Club Songs (Billboard) | 10 |
| US Hot R&B/Hip-Hop Songs (Billboard) | 47 |

=== Year-end charts ===
| Chart (2006) | Position |
|---|---|
| UK Urban (Music Week) | 39 |

== Release history ==
| Country | Date | Format | Label |
|---|---|---|---|
| United States | November 15, 2005 | Digital download | Motown |
| United States | December 6, 2005 | CD single | Motown |
| United Kingdom | May 29, 2006 | Digital download | Island |
| United Kingdom | June 12, 2006 | CD single, digital EP | Island |
