= Songversation =

Studio album by India.Arie
- Released: June 25, 2013
- Recorded: 2010–2013
- Genre: R&B
- Length: 53:41
- Label: Soulbird Music; Motown Records

India.Arie chronology
Testimony: Vol. 2, Love & Politics (2009)	Songversation (2013)	Christmas With Friends (2015)

Songversation is the fifth studio album by American singer India.Arie. The album was released on June 25, 2013, by Soulbird Music and Motown Records. It includes the singles "6th Avenue" (released in 2012), "Cocoa Butter" and "Just Do You" (both released in 2013). It also includes "I Am Light" which was featured in the 2014 film Beyond the Lights. A music video for the album track "Break the Shell" was released as well.

== Critical reception ==
Professional ratings
Aggregate scores
Source	Rating
Metacritic	64/100
Review scores
Source	Rating
AllMusic	3.5/5 stars

Review aggregator Metacritic, which assigns a normalised rating out of 100 to reviews from mainstream critics, the album has a weighted average score of 64 based on four reviews, indicating "generally favorable reviews".

== Commercial performance ==
The album debuted at number seven on the Billboard 200 chart, with first-week sales of 31,000 copies in the United States. The album has sold 113,000 copies in the US as of September 2015.

== Track listing ==
No.	Title	Length
1.	"SoulBird Intro"	0:35
2.	"Just Do You"	3:12
3.	"This Love"	3:53
4.	"Nothing That I Love More"	2:52
5.	"Flowers"	3:53
6.	"Cocoa Butter"	3:55
7.	"SoulBird Interlude: Trombone"	0:36
8.	"Moved By You"	4:48
9.	"Life I Know"	3:23
10.	"Break The Shell"	4:09
11.	"SoulBird Rise"	4:10
12.	"Thy Will Be Done" (featuring Gramps Morgan)	4:33
13.	"Brothers' Keeper"	3:40
14.	"One"	5:25
15.	"SoulBird Outro: Clarinet"	0:36
16.	"I Am Light"	3:52
Total length:		53:41

Deluxe edition bonus tracks
No.	Title	Length
17.	"SoulBird Reprise: Ney"	0:35
18.	"Thank You"	3:42
19.	"6th Avenue"	2:54
20.	"Strange Fruit"	5:26

Target Deluxe Edition bonus tracks
No.	Title	Length
21.	"Life Is Good"	2:55
22.	"Chicken Soup In A Song"	2:59

== Charts ==
=== Weekly charts ===
Chart (2013)	Peak position
US Billboard 200	7
US Top R&B/Hip-Hop Albums (Billboard)	4
US Digital Albums (Billboard)	12
US Top Tastemaker Albums (Billboard)	21

=== Year-end charts ===
Chart (2013)	Position
US Top R&B/Hip-Hop Albums (Billboard)	61
