= India Arie =

American singer-songwriter (born 1975)

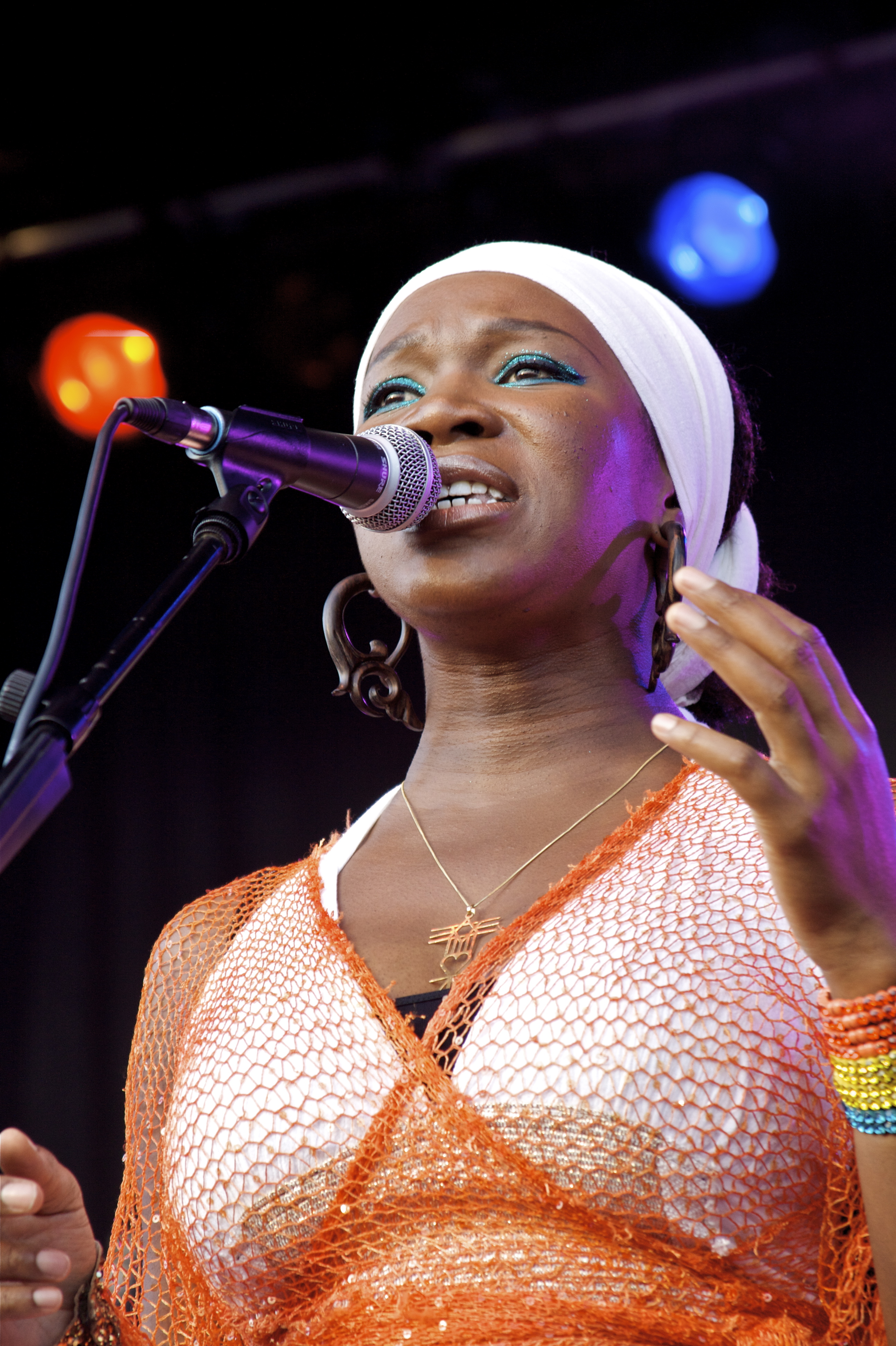
- Arie performing in 2009
- Born: India Arie Simpson; October 3, 1975 (age 51); Denver, Colorado, U.S.
- Other name: India.Arie
- Education: Savannah College of Art and Design
- Occupations: Singer; songwriter
- Years active: 1997–present
- Parent: Ralph Simpson
- Musical career
- Origin: Atlanta, Georgia, U.S.
- Genres: R&B; neo soul
- Labels: Motown (1999–2007); Universal Republic (2007–present)
- Website: soulbird.com

India Arie Simpson (born October 3, 1975) is an American singer-songwriter, and record producer. She rose to prominence with her debut album, Acoustic Soul (2001), which was a commercial and critical success. She has since released the albums Voyage to India (2002), Testimony: Vol. 1, Life & Relationship (2006), Songversation (2013) and Worthy (2019). Her music blends elements of R&B, soul, and neo-soul, often incorporating themes of self-empowerment, spirituality, and social consciousness.

Arie has sold over five million records in the US and 10 million worldwide, and has won four Grammy Awards from 23 nominations, including Best R&B Album. Arie is recognized for her advocacy of positive representation in music and has participated in humanitarian and wellness initiatives. She has spoken publicly about issues related to self-acceptance, race, and cultural identity.

== Background ==
India Arie was born in Denver, the daughter of Joyce and Ralph Simpson. Her musical skills were encouraged by both parents in her younger years. Her mother was a singer (she was signed to Motown as a teenager and opened for Stevie Wonder and Al Green) and has become Arie's stylist. Arie has an older brother named J'On and a younger sister named Mary. Arie is African-American, and according to a DNA analysis, she descends from the Mende people of Sierra Leone, the Kru of Liberia and the Fula of Guinea-Bissau.

After Arie's parents divorced, her mother moved the family to Atlanta when India was 13. Arie had taken up a succession of musical instruments throughout her schooling in Denver. But her interest in the guitar, while attending the Savannah College of Art and Design, led to a personal revelation about songwriting and performing. "When I started tapping into my own sensitivity, I started to understand people better. It was a direct result of writing songs", she said at the press release of her debut album, Acoustic Soul.

Co-founding the Atlanta-based independent music collective Government Earthseed (Government was the collective artists' name and Earthseed was their independent label name), her one-song turn on a locally released compilation led to a second-stage gig at the 1998 Lilith Fair. In 1999, a Universal/Motown music scout signed her and made an introduction to former Motown CEO Kedar Massenburg. Arie resided in New York City for over a decade, before moving back to Atlanta to focus on her career and music.

Named to Oprah Winfrey's SuperSoul100 list of visionaries and influential leaders, Arie performed Songversation during 2017 motivational cruises.

== Career ==
Arie released her debut album Acoustic Soul on March 27, 2001. The album was met with positive reviews and commercial success. Acoustic Soul debuted at number ten on the U.S. Billboard 200 and number three on the Top R&B/Hip-Hop Albums. Within months, without the concentrated radio airplay that typically powers pop and rap albums, Acoustic Soul was certified double platinum by the Recording Industry Association of America (RIAA), selling 2,180,000 copies in the U.S. and 3,000,000 copies worldwide. The album was also certified Gold by the British Phonographic Industry and platinum by Music Canada. The album was promoted with the release of the lead single "Video". "Video" attained commercial success peaking at 47 on the US Billboard Hot 100 and becoming her highest-charting song in the region to date. The album's second single "Brown Skin" failed to chart on the Billboard Hot 100, but it became her highest-charting single in the United Kingdom, peaking at number 29.

Arie performed a duet with rock singer-guitarist John Mellencamp on the song "Peaceful World" for his 2001 album Cuttin' Heads. While Arie and the album were nominated for seven Grammy awards in 2002, they won no awards, losing in five of seven categories to Alicia Keys. She closed the ceremony with a performance of her song "Video". Arie performed a duet with jazz singer Cassandra Wilson on the song "Just Another Parade" for her 2002 album Belly of the Sun.

Arie followed the success of her debut on September 24, 2002, with the release of Voyage to India. It debuted at number six on the Billboard 200 with first week sales of 109,000 copies and topped the Top R&B/Hip-Hop Albums, with the RIAA certifying it Platinum. At the 2003 Grammy Awards, it won Best R&B Album, and the single "Little Things" won Best Urban/Alternative Performance. The song "Get It Together" was featured on many film soundtracks including Brown Sugar (2002) and Shark Tale (2004).

On September 12, 2005, Arie performed "Just 4 2day", a song written for her appearance on the debut of The Tyra Banks Show. She also performed "What About the Child", a song that did not air but was made available as a one-dollar Internet download to support child victims of Hurricanes Katrina and Rita. Arie is also featured on Stevie Wonder's album A Time to Love, released on October 18, 2005. Arie and Wonder duet on the title track "A Time to Love", written by Arie. Which was nominated for Best Pop Collaboration with Vocals at the 2006 Grammy Awards. Three years earlier, their rendition of Mel Tormé's 1944 classic "The Christmas Song", recorded for the holiday TV commercial for retailer Target, had been nominated for the same category, making it the first song created and financed exclusively for a commercial to be nominated for a Grammy Award.

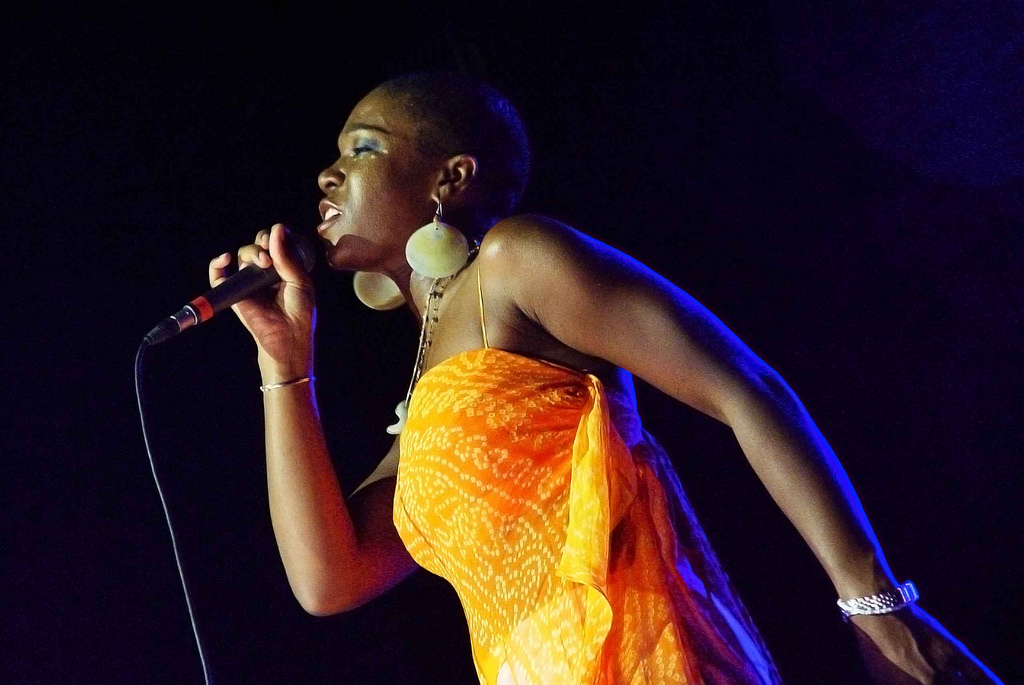
India Arie performing in Lokeren Belgium, August 3, 2004

The first-week sales of Arie's album Testimony: Vol. 1, Life & Relationship, 161,000 copies, are her best sales week to date. The album was certified gold in August 2006, selling 730,000 in US and 1,300,000 worldwide. "I Am Not My Hair", a collaboration with Akon, was the most successful release from Testimony: Vol. 1., reaching the U.S. Billboard Hot 100 at No. 97 and the UK Singles Chart at No. 65. On the April 16, 2007, episode of The Oprah Winfrey Show entitled "After Imus: Now What?", Arie guest-starred as a panelist. Arie performed a duet with singer Anthony David for his song "Words" for his 2008 album Acey Duecy.

Her next album, Testimony: Vol. 2, Love & Politics was released on Tuesday, February 10, 2009. It debuted at No. 3 on the Billboard 200, and No. 2 on the R&B chart. Within this CD, Arie collaborated with such artists as Sezen Aksu, Keb Mo, Gramps Morgan and Musiq Soulchild to fulfill her self-proclaimed desire to "do projects with people who are making music that is meaningful, with a lot of integrity and a lot of sonic diversity". Arie also identified this CD as her first to write and sing songs without worrying about public opinion after a much-needed vacation to Hawaii. The album was her first produced and released after her departure from Motown to Universal Records. Arie performed "Video" with British singer Adele at the 2009 VH1 Divas. Arie is one of over 70 artists singing on "We Are the World: 25 for Haiti", a charity single in aid of the 2010 Haiti earthquake. Arie contributed vocals to "Imagine" for the 2010 Herbie Hancock album, The Imagine Project along with Seal, Pink, Jeff Beck, Konono N°1, Oumou Sangare and others.

In the fall of 2010, she was a featured guest vocalist on Carlos Santana's version of The Beatles song "While My Guitar Gently Weeps" from his album Guitar Heaven. The song also features Yo-Yo Ma on cello.

In September 2012, she featured in a campaign called "30 Songs/30 Days" to support Half the Sky: Turning Oppression into Opportunity for Women Worldwide, a multi-platform media project inspired by Nicholas Kristof and Sheryl WuDunn's book.

In March 2013, it was announced that Arie was working on her upcoming fifth studio album, Songversation, which was released on June 25, 2013. The first single of the album, "6th Avenue", was released on iTunes on November 4, 2012; it was produced by India Arie and Israeli musician Idan Raichel. The second single "Cocoa Butter" was released on iTunes on April 9, 2013.

In 2015, she released a collaborative album with musician Joe Sample titled Christmas with Friends.

In July 2016, she premiered her new single "Breathe" inspired by the Black Lives Matter movement, especially Eric Garner's last words. She also announced a new album titled Worthy was in the works. She performed the single on the Soul Train Awards with host Erykah Badu in November.

In June 2017, she announced the release of her first EP SongVersation: Medicine on June 30. It was preceded by the single "Breathe" and the new single "I Am Light" which was originally included on her 2013 Songversation album. She expressed that the EP was "made to be listened to in a quiet time, prayer, meditation, Yoga. My wish is that these songs bring softness, clarity, calm, and inspiration."

In September 2018, she premiered her new single "That Magic". The song serves as the lead single from her sixth studio album titled Worthy which was released on February 15, 2019.

In February 2022, Arie joined several artists to announce plans to remove her music from music service Spotify because it platformed podcast host Joe Rogan. According to media reports, Arie's planned departure from the service was motivated by Rogan's use of anti-Black language relating to race in the past. Arie’s music returned to the streaming service over a year later.

== Theatre ==
In 2009, India Arie portrayed Nina Simone in a staged reading at the Roundabout Theatre Company of the Broadway musical Soul Doctor, about the life of Shlomo Carlebach written by Daniel Wise.

== Personal life ==
In June 2025, it was revealed that India Arie's father had been physically and sexually abusive toward her and her mother.

== Discography ==
=== Studio albums ===
- Acoustic Soul (2001)
- Voyage to India (2002)
- Testimony: Vol. 1, Life & Relationship (2006)
- Testimony: Vol. 2, Love & Politics (2009)
- Songversation (2013)
- Christmas with Friends (2015)
- Worthy (2019)

=== Collaborations ===
- Guitar Heaven: The Greatest Guitar Classics of All Time by Carlos Santana (2010) – India sings "While My Guitar Gently Weeps" with Yo Yo Ma on cello
- The Imagine Project by Herbie Hancock (2010) – India sings Imagine with Pink, Seal, Konono No. 1, Oumou Sangare and Jeff Beck
- "My Everything" by Sauti Sol (2020) – Midnight Train
- "Love Is Like" by Omar (2025) - from the album Brighter The Days

== Awards ==
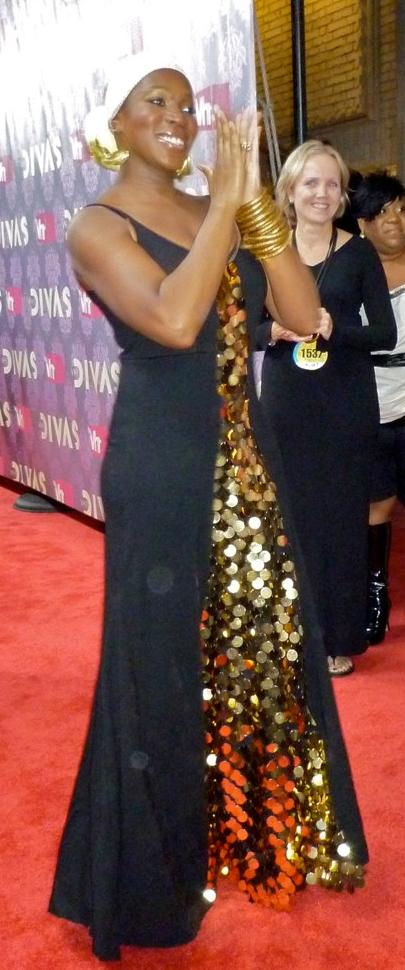
India Arie on the red carpet at VH1 Divas 2009.

Grammy Awards

The Grammy Award is an honor awarded by The Recording Academy to recognize outstanding achievement in the mainly English-language music industry. Arie has won four Grammy awards from twenty-three nominations.

Year	Nominee / work	Award	Result
2002	Acoustic Soul	Album of the Year	Nominated
2002	Acoustic Soul	Best R&B Album	Nominated
2002	"Video"	Record of the Year	Nominated
2002	"Video"	Song of the Year	Nominated
2002	"Video"	Best Female R&B Vocal Performance	Nominated
2002	"Video"	Best R&B Song	Nominated
2002	India Arie	Best New Artist	Nominated
2003	"The Christmas Song" (with Stevie Wonder)	Best Pop Collaboration with Vocals	Nominated
2003	"Little Things"	Best Urban/Alternative Performance	Won
2003	"Good Man"	Best R&B Song	Nominated
2003	Voyage to India	Best R&B Album	Won
2006	"A Time to Love" (with Stevie Wonder)	Best Pop Collaboration with Vocals	Nominated
2007	"I Am Not My Hair"	Best Female R&B Vocal Performance	Nominated
2007	"I Am Not My Hair"	Best R&B Song	Nominated
2007	Testimony: Vol. 1, Life & Relationships	Best R&B Album	Nominated
2008	"Beautiful Flower"	Best R&B Song	Nominated
2009	"Words" (with Anthony David)	Best R&B Performance by a Duo or Group with Vocals	Nominated
2010	"Chocolate High" (featuring Musiq Soulchild)	Best R&B Performance by a Duo or Group with Vocals	Nominated
2010	Testimony Vol. 2, Love & Politics	Best R&B Album	Nominated
2010	"Pearls" (with Dobet Gnahoré)	Best Urban/Alternative Performance	Won
2011	"Imagine" (with Herbie Hancock, Pink, Seal, Konono Nº1, Jeff Beck & Oumou Sangaré)	Best Pop Collaboration with Vocals	Won
2018	"SongVersation: Medicine"	Best New Age Album	Nominated
2020	"Steady Love"	Best Traditional R&B Performance	Nominated

BET Awards

Year	Nominee / work	Award	Result
2001	India Arie	Best New Artist	Nominated
2002	India Arie	Best Female R&B Artist	Won
2003	India Arie	Best Female R&B Artist	Won
2006	India Arie	Best Female R&B Artist	Nominated

Soul Train Music Awards

Year	Nominee / work	Award	Result
2002	India Arie	Best New Artist	Nominated
2002	Acoustic Soul	Best R&B/Soul Album – Female	Nominated
2002	"Video"	Best R&B/Soul Single – Female	Nominated
2003	"Little Things"	Best R&B/Soul Single – Female	Nominated
2007	Testimony: Vol. 1, Life & Relationships	Best R&B/Soul Album – Female	Nominated

NAACP Image Awards

Year	Nominee / work	Award	Result
2002	India Arie	Outstanding New Artist	Nominated
2002	India Arie	Outstanding Female Artist	Nominated
2002	Acoustic Soul	Outstanding Album	Nominated
2003	India Arie & Stevie Wonder	Outstanding Duo or Group	Won
2003	India Arie	Outstanding Female Artist	Won
2003	"Little Things"	Outstanding Music Video	Won
2003	"Little Things"	Outstanding Song	Nominated
2003	Voyage to India	Outstanding Album	Nominated
2004	"The Truth"	Outstanding Music Video	Nominated
2006	India Arie	Outstanding Female Artist	Nominated
2007	India Arie	Outstanding Female Artist	Nominated
2007	"I Am Not My Hair"	Outstanding Music Video	Nominated
2007	"I Am Not My Hair"	Outstanding Song	Won
2008	"Beautiful Flower"	Outstanding Song	Nominated
2009	India Arie & Anthony David	Outstanding Duo or Group	Nominated
2010	India Arie	Outstanding Female Artist	Nominated
2014	India Arie	Outstanding Female Artist	Nominated
2014	"Cocoa Butter"	Outstanding Music Video	Nominated

== Tours ==
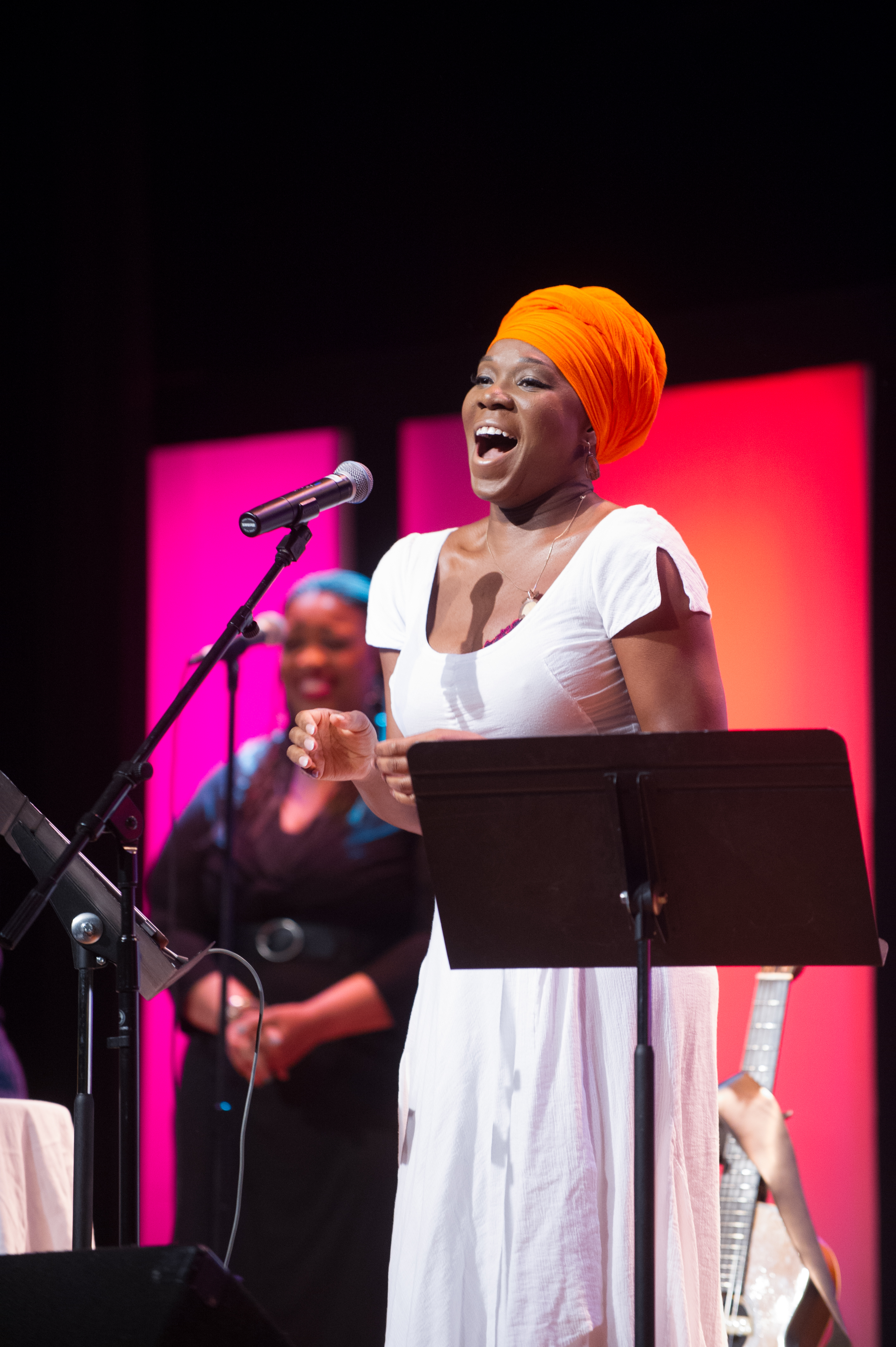
India Arie performing at Texas A&M University–Commerce in April 2014

Headlining

- Voyage to World Tour (2002/03)
- Testimony Tour (2006/10)
- Songversation Tour (2013/14)

Opening act

- Lovers Rock Tour (2001)

== Filmography ==
List of television and film credits
Year	Title	Role	Notes
2002–2010	Between the Lions	Herself	9 episodes
2003	American Dreams	Nina Simone	"Act of Contrition" (Season 1, Episode 16)
2003	The Bernie Mac Show	Herself	"Raging Election" (Season 2, Episode 13)
2004	Blue's Clues	Herself	"Bluestock" (Season 6, Episode 9)
2005	Sesame Street	Herself	"What Happens Next?" (Season 36, Episode 18)
2006	One on One	Herself	"I Love L.A.: Part 1" (Season 5, Episode 21)
2009	Pastor Brown	Lateefah	Debut film
2015	Being Mary Jane	Herself	"Life in the Sand" (Season 2, Episode 9)
