= Towles (surname) =

Towles is a surname.

Notable people with the name include:

- Amor Towles (born 1964), American novelist
- Dorothea Towles (1922–2006), model
- Gladys Root (née Towles; 1905–1982), American attorney
- J. R. Towles (born 1984), American baseball player
- Joseph Towles (1937–1988), American anthropologist and author
- Lois Towles (1912–1983), American classical pianist, music educator, and community activist
- Nat Towles (1905–1962), American musician, jazz and big band leader
- Tom Towles (1950–2015), American actor
