= American Legacy =

American magazine

American Legacy was a quarterly magazine that covered African-American history and culture. The magazine was headquartered in Mount Vernon, New York, and was founded in 1995 by Rodney J. Reynolds as a joint venture with Forbes Inc. The first issue was released in 1996. The magazine was most recently published by RJR Communications, Inc. which became the full owner of the magazine in January 2009.

The 2007 motion picture The Great Debaters was based on an article about the Wiley College 1935 debate team that appeared in the Spring 1997 issue.

As of 2007, the magazine had circulation of 500,000, 80 percent of which was free distribution via schools, black churches, and other organizations.

The magazine ceased operating sometime between 2015 and 2023.
