= Jurnee Smollett =

American actress (born 1986)

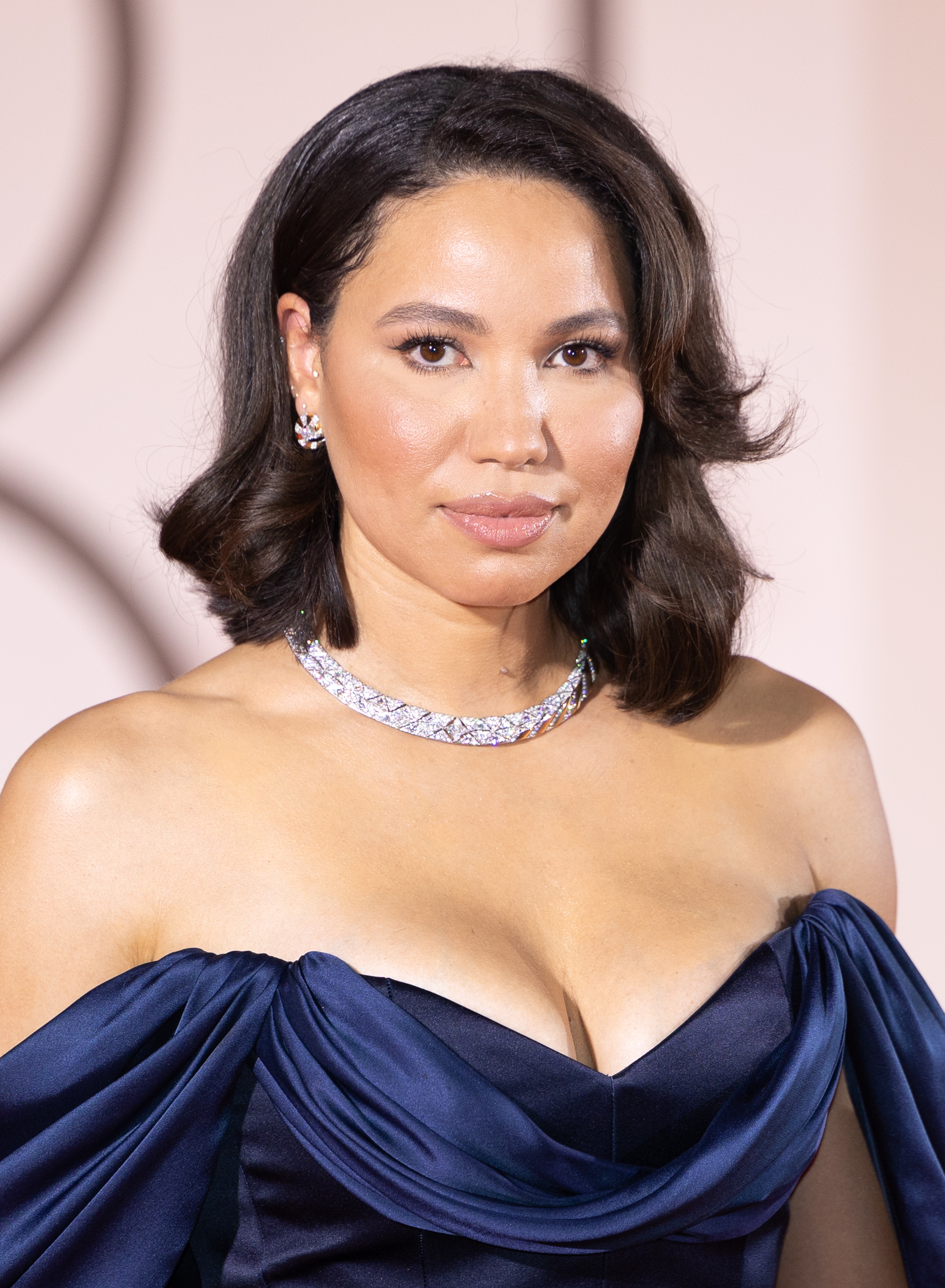
- Smollett in 2024
- Born: Jurnee Diana Smollett; October 1, 1986 (age 39); New York City, U.S.
- Other name: Jurnee Smollett-Bell
- Occupation: Actress
- Years active: 1991–present
- Spouse: Josiah Bell (m. 2010; div. 2021)
- Children: 1
- Relatives: Jussie Smollett (brother); Jake Smollett (brother)

Jurnee Diana Smollett (born October 1, 1986) is an American actress. She began her career as a child actress appearing on television sitcoms, including On Our Own (1994–1995) and Full House (1992–1994). She gained greater recognition with her role in Kasi Lemmons's independent film Eve's Bayou (1997), which earned her a Critics' Choice Movie Award.

As an adult, Smollett starred in the films The Great Debaters (2007), Temptation: Confessions of a Marriage Counselor (2013), and Birds of Prey (2020). Her television roles include the NBC sports drama Friday Night Lights (2009–2011), the WGN America period drama Underground (2016–2017), and the HBO fantasy horrors True Blood (2013–2014) and Lovecraft Country (2020), receiving a nomination for the Primetime Emmy Award for Outstanding Lead Actress in a Drama Series for the latter.

== Early life and education ==
Jurnee Diana Smollett was born on October 1, 1986 in New York City, to Janet Harris and Joel Smollett. Her father had ancestors from Russia and Poland, while her mother is African American. She is the fourth of six siblings, all performers: one sister, Jazz Smollett, and four brothers, Jussie, JoJo, Jake, and Jocqui.

== Career ==
=== Early works ===
Smollett began her acting career appearing on Martin and Out All Night in 1992. She then had recurring roles as Denise Frazer on the ABC family sitcoms Full House and Hangin' with Mr. Cooper. From 1994 to 1995, she co-starred with her siblings in the short-lived ABC sitcom On Our Own. In 1996, she appeared in the Francis Ford Coppola film Jack, making her big-screen debut.

Smollett received critical acclaim for her performance as 10-year-old Eve in the 1997 film Eve's Bayou opposite Lynn Whitfield, Samuel L. Jackson and Debbi Morgan. In casting the role, writer-director Kasi Lemmons envisioned "a light-skinned black child who could convey the nuances of a Creole child in the 60s." She received the Critic's Choice Award and was nominated for an NAACP Image Award. The following year, she joined the cast of the CBS sitcom Cosby, for which she won two NAACP Image Awards. In 1999, Smollett starred in the ABC TV film Selma, Lord, Selma. In 2000, she co-starred with Sharon Stone and Billy Connolly in the film Beautiful Joe. In 2001, she played the daughter of Angela Bassett in the television film Ruby's Bucket of Blood. In 2005, she co-starred with Bow Wow and Brandon T. Jackson in the roller skating film Roll Bounce. In 2006, she appeared in the drama film Gridiron Gang.

=== 2007–2012 ===
In 2007, Smollett portrayed Samantha Booke (loosely based on Henrietta Bell Wells), the sole female debater at Wiley College in the historical film The Great Debaters. The film was produced by Oprah Winfrey and Harvey Weinstein and starred Denzel Washington, who also directed the feature. For her performance, Smollett received NAACP Image Award for Outstanding Actress in a Motion Picture. The following year, she returned to television, appearing in two episodes of ABC medical drama Grey's Anatomy. From 2009 to 2011, she was a regular cast member in the DirecTV drama series Friday Night Lights playing Jess Merriweather. From 2010 to 2011, she also co-starred with Jim Belushi and Jerry O'Connell on the short-lived CBS legal drama The Defenders.

=== 2013–present ===
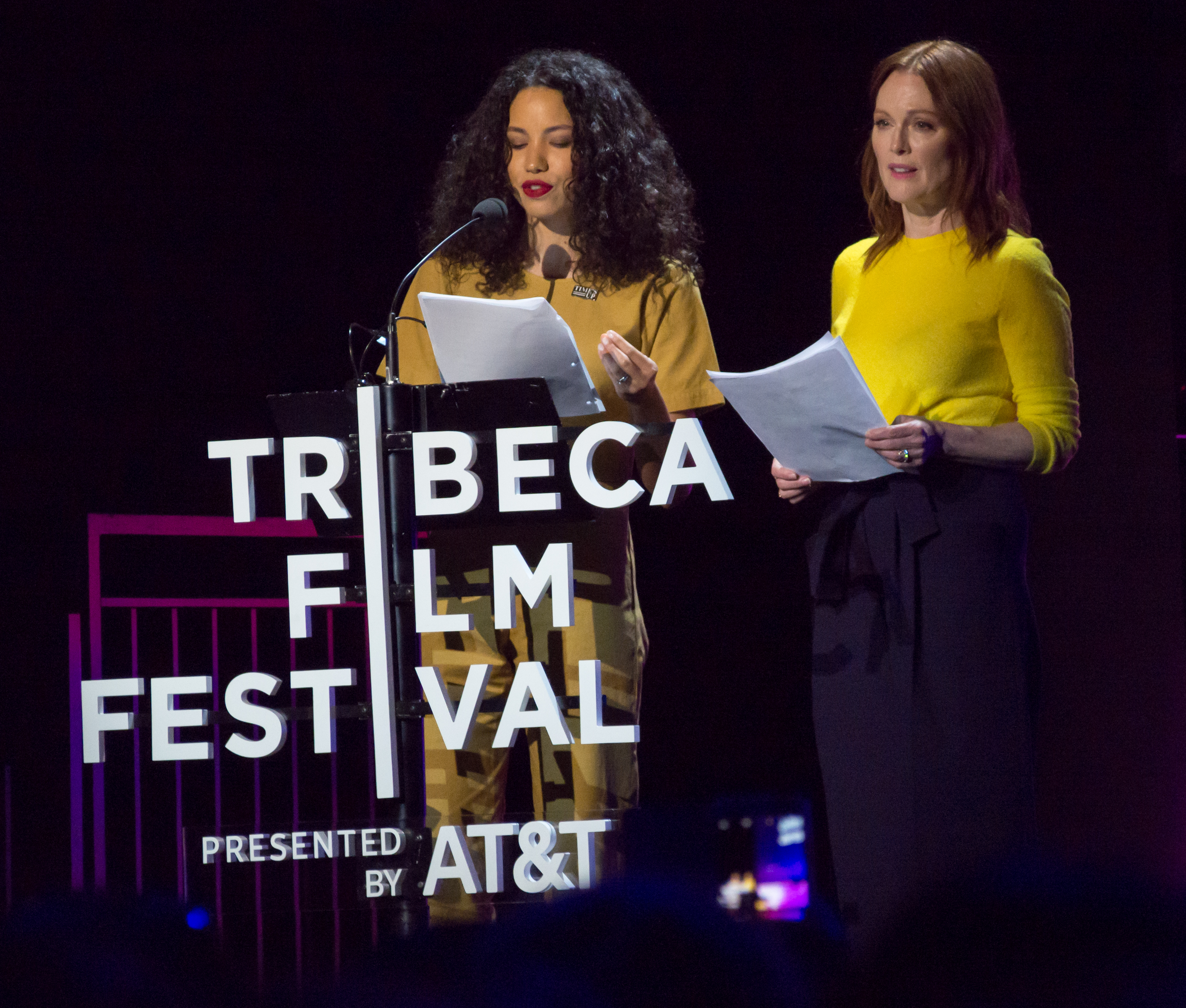
Jurnee Smollett and Julianne Moore at the Tribeca Film Festival in 2018

In 2013, Smollett played the leading role in the drama film Temptation: Confessions of a Marriage Counselor directed by Tyler Perry. The film received negative reviews from critics, but was a box-office hit, grossing $53,125,354. It is the highest-grossing Tyler Perry film which the writer-director did not star in, and the highest-grossing Tyler Perry drama. From 2013 to 2014, she was a regular on the HBO series True Blood. She later played Juanita Leonard, the wife of boxer Sugar Ray Leonard, in the 2016 biographical sport film Hands of Stone co-starring with Usher and Robert De Niro.

In 2015, Smollett was cast as lead character in the WGN America period drama series Underground. Smollett played Rosalee, a shy house slave working on a plantation in 1857. She portrayed Black Canary in the 2020 film Birds of Prey, and Letitia "Leti" Lewis in the 2020 HBO series Lovecraft Country. In August 2021, it was revealed that Smollett will star in a solo Black Canary Movie from Warner Bros. and DC Films at HBO Max. In November 2021, she joined Jamie Foxx and Tommy Lee Jones in Amazon Studios' courtroom drama project The Burial directed by Maggie Betts. In 2022, she executive produced and co-starred in the Netflix thriller film, Lou.

== Personal life ==
Smollett has been active in HIV/AIDS causes since she was 11. Her first encounter with the disease came at age seven when a crew member of On Our Own died of AIDS. She was inspired by the HIV/AIDS survivor Hydeia Broadbent, with whom she eventually worked for HIV/AIDS awareness, including for the Black AIDS Institute and Red Cross. She spoke at the Ryan White Youth Conference, and was on the board of directors of Artists for a New South Africa, an organization dedicated to HIV/AIDS in Africa until around 2013. Smollett was also on the board of directors for the Children’s Defense Fund in 2020.

On October 24, 2010, Smollett married musician Josiah Bell. Their first and only child, a son named Hunter, was born on October 31, 2016. In March 2020, Smollett filed for divorce, which was finalized in August 2021.

== Filmography ==
=== Film ===
Key
†	Denotes works that have not yet been released

Year	Film	Role	Notes
1996	Jack	Phoebe	
1997	Eve's Bayou	Eve Batiste	
2000	Beautiful Joe	Vivien	
2005	Roll Bounce	Tori Turner	
2006	Gridiron Gang	Danyelle Rollins	
2007	The Great Debaters	Samantha Booke	
2013	Temptation: Confessions of a Marriage Counselor	Judith	
2016	Hands of Stone	Juanita Leonard	
2018	One Last Thing	Lucy Dillinger	
2020	Birds of Prey	Dinah Laurel Lance / Black Canary	
2022	Spiderhead	Lizzy	
2022	Lou	Hannah Dawson	Also executive producer
2023	We Grown Now	Dolores	Also executive producer
2023	The Burial	Mame Downes	
2024	The Order	Joanne Carney	

=== Television ===
Year	Film	Role	Notes
1992	Out All Night	Laquita	Episode: "The Kid"
1992	Hangin' with Mr. Cooper	Denise Frazer	4 episodes
1992	Martin	Little Girl	Episode: "I Saw Gina Kissing Santa Claus"
1992–1994	Full House	Denise Frazer	12 episodes
1994–1995	On Our Own	Jordee Jerrico	Series regular (20 episodes)
1996	NYPD Blue	Hanna	Episode: "Where's 'Swaldo"
1998–1999	Cosby	Jurnee	Series regular (24 episodes)
1999	Selma, Lord, Selma	Sheyann Webb	Television film
1999	Happily Ever After: Fairy Tales for Every Child	Ali Baba	Voice, episode: "Ali Baba and the Forty Thieves"
2001	Ruby's Bucket of Blood	Emerald Delacroix	Television film
2002	Strong Medicine	Ruby	Episode: "Positive"
2002	ER	Romy	Episode: "Next of Kin"
2003	Wanda at Large	Holly Hawkins	Series regular (6 episodes)
2006	House	Tracy	Episode: "Fools for Love"
2008	Grey's Anatomy	Beth	2 episodes
2009–2011	Friday Night Lights	Jess Merriweather	Series regular (26 episodes)
2010–2011	The Defenders	Lisa Tyler	Series regular (18 episodes)
2012–2013	The Mob Doctor	Traci Coolidge	2 episodes
2013	Do No Harm	Abby Young	2 episodes
2013	Parenthood	Heather Hall	7 episodes
2013–2014	True Blood	Nicole Wright	Series regular (19 episodes)
2016–2017	Underground	Rosalee	Series regular (19 episodes)
2017–2018	Sofia the First	Chrysta	Voice, recurring role (8 episodes)
2020	The Twilight Zone	Jasmine Delancey	Episode: "Ovation"
2020	Lovecraft Country	Letitia "Leti" Lewis	Series regular (10 episodes)
2025	Smoke	Michelle Calderone	Series regular
2026	Life, Larry and the Pursuit of Unhappiness	Rosa Parks	Episode: "Livingston"

== Awards and nominations ==
Year	Association	Category	Work	Result
2010	Audie Awards	Audiobook of the Year	Nelson Mandela's Favorite African Folktales	Won
2010	Audie Awards	Multi-Voiced Performance	Nelson Mandela's Favorite African Folktales	Won
1999	Black Reel Awards	Best Supporting Actress: Television Movie/Cable	Selma, Lord, Selma	Nominated
2001	Black Reel Awards	Best Supporting Actress: Television Movie/Cable	Ruby's Bucket of Blood	Nominated
2017	Black Reel Awards	Best Actress, Drama Series	Underground	Nominated
2024	Black Reel Awards	Outstanding Supporting Performance	The Burial	Nominated
1997	Critics' Choice Movie Awards	Best Young Performer	Eve's Bayou	Won
2021	Critics' Choice Super Awards	Best Actress in a Superhero Movie	Birds of Prey	Nominated
2021	Critics' Choice Super Awards	Best Actress in a Horror Series	Lovecraft Country	Won
2021	Critics' Choice Television Awards	Best Actress in a Drama Series	Lovecraft Country	Nominated
1997	Chicago Film Critics Association	Most Promising Actress	Eve's Bayou	Nominated
2020	IGN Awards	Best Movie Ensemble	Birds of Prey	Nominated
2021	MTV Movie & TV Awards	Most Frightened Performance	Lovecraft Country	Nominated
2021	MTV Movie & TV Awards	Best Fight	Birds of Prey	Nominated
1997	NAACP Image Awards	Outstanding Youth Actor/Actress	Eve's Bayou	Nominated
1999	NAACP Image Awards	Outstanding Youth Actor/Actress	Cosby	Won
2000	NAACP Image Awards	Outstanding Youth Actor/Actress	Cosby	Won
2008	NAACP Image Awards	Outstanding Actress in a Motion Picture	The Great Debaters	Won
2010	NAACP Image Awards	Outstanding Supporting Actress in a Drama Series	Friday Night Lights	Nominated
2017	NAACP Image Awards	Outstanding Actress in a Drama Series	Underground	Nominated
2018	NAACP Image Awards	Outstanding Actress in a Drama Series	Underground	Nominated
2021	NAACP Image Awards	Outstanding Actress in a Drama Series	Lovecraft Country	Nominated
2021	Primetime Emmy Awards	Outstanding Lead Actress in a Drama Series	Lovecraft Country	Nominated
1997	San Diego Film Critics Society	Best Supporting Actress	Eve's Bayou	Won
2021	Saturn Awards	Best Supporting Actress in a Film	Birds of Prey	Nominated
2021	Screen Actors Guild Awards	Outstanding Performance by an Ensemble in a Drama Series	Lovecraft Country	Nominated
2008	Teen Choice Awards	Choice Movie Breakout Female	The Great Debaters	Nominated
1995	Young Artist Awards	Best Performance by an Actress Under Ten in a TV Series	On Our Own	Nominated
1997	Young Artist Awards	Best Leading Young Actress in a Feature Film	Eve's Bayou	Nominated
1998	YoungStar Awards	Best Leading Young Actress in a Feature Film	Eve's Bayou	Nominated
