= James L. Farmer Sr. =

American author, theologian, and educator

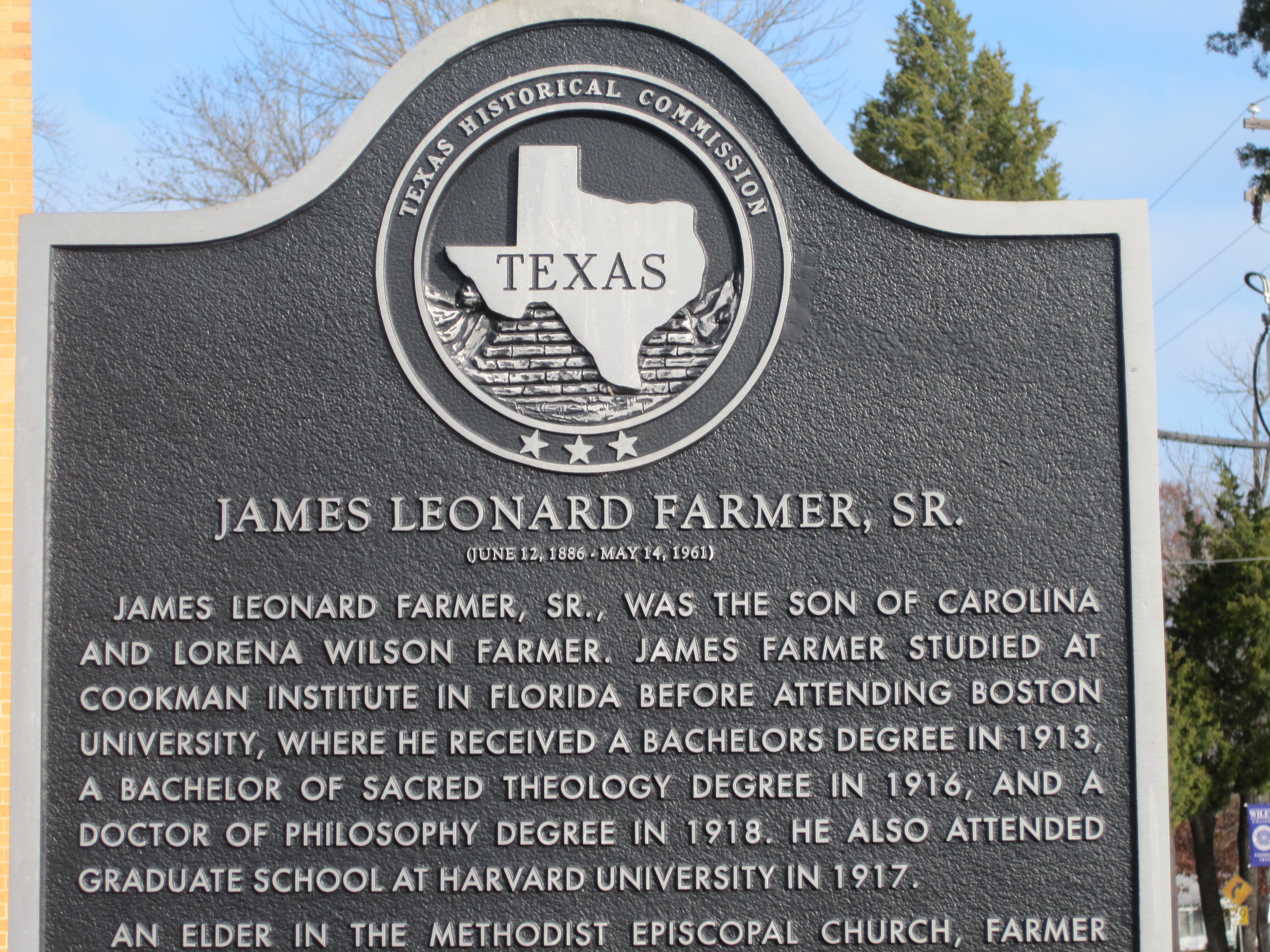
Historical marker dedicated to James L. Farmer Sr. at Wiley College in Marshall, Texas

James Leonard Farmer Sr. (June 12, 1886 – May 14, 1961), known as J. Leonard Farmer, was an American author, theologian, and educator. He was a minister in the Methodist Episcopal Church, South and an academic in early religious history as well as theology.

== Early life and education ==
James Leonard Farmer was the son of farm workers and former slaves from Kingstree, South Carolina. His father was Carolina and his mother Lorena (Wilson) Farmer. After limited schooling in Georgia and Florida, Farmer gained a scholarship to Boston University. He earned his bachelor, masters of theology, and doctoral degrees at this institution.

== Career ==
Farmer had a dual career as a minister and an academic. He was ordained as a minister in the Methodist Episcopal Church, South. He taught and mentored as a professor at several historically black colleges and universities in the South, including Huston-Tillotson and Wiley colleges in Texas; Rust College in Mississippi; and most notably Howard University in Washington, DC, from 1939 to 1946, returning to Texas to Huston as dean until his retirement in 1956. During this period, he served as an administrator as well as a professor.

== Marriage and family ==
In 1917 Farmer married Pearl Marion. They had two children: Helen Louise and James Farmer. Their son became a renowned civil rights leader during the Civil Rights Movement. A proponent of non-violent action, his son James Farmer was a co-founder of the Congress for Racial Equality and helped organize the Freedom Rides of 1961.

== Representation in popular culture ==
- Aspects of Farmer Sr.'s life are chronicled in the film The Great Debaters (2007), in which the minister is played by Forest Whitaker.
