= Towles =

Towles may refer to:

- Towles (surname), including a list of people with the name
- Towles, California, former name of Towle, California
- Towles Intermediate School, Fort Wayne, Indiana
- Towles Glacier
