= Henrietta Bell Wells =

American debater and social worker (1912–2008)

The 1930 Wiley College debate team. Wells is in the center of the front row.

Henrietta Bell Wells (October 11, 1912 – February 27, 2008) was the first female member of the debate team at Wiley College, a historically black college in Texas. She participated with them in 1935, when their nearly undefeated season culminated in defeating the team of nationally ranked University of Southern California.

== Early life and education ==
She was born Henrietta Pauline Bell on the banks of Buffalo Bayou in Houston, Texas to Octavia Bell, a West Indian single mother. Her maternal grandfather was a "strong Episcopalian" in the West Indies, and she was raised in the Episcopal Church. She graduated as valedictorian from Phillis Wheatley High School in Houston. The YWCA gave her a small scholarship to attend Wiley College.

Wiley's debate team had defeated some of the top historically black colleges, including Tuskegee University and Howard University. They had made history in 1930 by participating in the first college debate between white and African American students when debating students from the Law School at the University of Michigan.

== Marriage ==
Bell returned to Houston after graduation. Bell married fellow Episcopalian the Rev. Wallace L. Wells. She became a social worker and teacher in Gary, Indiana; Houston, Texas; Birmingham, Alabama, and New Orleans, Louisiana, as her husband's calling took them to different cities. Their assignment in Gary, Indiana included overseeing the building of the architecturally significant St. Augustine's Episcopal Church (Gary, Indiana). When they resided in New Orleans, Mrs. Wells served as the Dean of Women at Dillard University.

== Career ==
Wells became a social worker and teacher, drawing from each field. She became a supervisor in social work.

When they were in New Orleans, Mrs. Wells served as the Dean of Women at Dillard University, and her husband was Dean of Chapel.

The character Samantha Booke in the 2007 movie, The Great Debaters, played by Jurnee Smollett, was loosely based on Wells. Wells stated that she had told Denzel Washington, who directed the film, to also play her team's coach, Melvin B. Tolson, which he did.

Bell died on February 27, 2008, aged 95. She is buried in Paradise North Cemetery in Houston, Texas.
