= Thomas Freeman (debate coach) =

American educator, minister, and debate coach (1919–2020)

Thomas Freeman (June 27, 1919 – June 6, 2020) was an American lecturer in religion, a preacher, and a debate coach. His students included Martin Luther King Jr. at Morehouse College and U.S. Congresswoman Barbara Jordan at Texas Southern University.

According to his New York Times obituary on June 17, 2020, Freeman was associated with the Texas Southern University debate team that "rose to national prominence". Freeman founded the team in 1949 and led it for more than 60 years. He also served as a consultant for Denzel Washington on the film The Great Debaters, offering actors a training camp on how to debate.

== Biography ==
=== Early life and education ===
Freeman was born in Richmond, Virginia, one of fifteen children born to his father Louis Hyne Freeman, a vegetable peddler, and his mother Louise Elizabeth (Willis) Freeman, who managed the home. As a child, he farmed vegetables for his father's produce store and became a boy preacher in his Baptist church, delivering his first sermon at the age of nine. At fifteen, he enrolled at Virginia Union University and graduated in 1939 with an English degree.

In 1942, Freeman earned a Bachelor of Divinity from Andover Newton Seminary, where he enrolled only three years after the school began enrolling African American students. Six years later, in 1948, he earned his doctorate in Homiletics from the University of Chicago Divinity School.

=== Academic appointments ===
Freeman taught as a visiting lecturer at Morehouse College in 1947, where a young Martin Luther King Jr. was among his undergraduate students. In 1949, he arrived at the newly created Texas Southern University (TSU) to teach philosophy, remaining connected to the Houston institution for 71 years. He retired from teaching at TSU in 2013.

In 1972, Freeman was also appointed as a lecturer in religion at Rice University, where he became the first African American faculty member in the school's School of Humanities and taught regularly until 1994.
