= Matthew W. Dogan =

African American college president (1863–1947)

- Matthew Winfred Dogan, circa 1913
- Born: Matthew Winfred Dogan; December 21, 1863; Pontotoc, Mississippi, US
- Died: June 17, 1947 (aged 83); Marshall, Texas, US
- Burial place: Wiles College Cemetery, Marshall, Texas
- Occupations: College President and professor

Academic background
- Education: Rust College

Academic work
- Discipline: Mathematics
- Institutions: Wiley College Central Tennessee College Rust College

Matthew Winfred Dogan (December 21, 1863 – June 17, 1947) was an African American academic administrator. He was the seventh president of Wiley College, serving for 46 years. He also established the Southern Athletic Conference, now known as the Southeastern Conference.

== Early life ==
Dogan was born in Pontotoc, Mississippi on December 21, 1863, on a cotton plantation when his parents had been enslaved. His parents were Jennie and William Dogan, a barber who had purchased their freedom from his enslaver in 1855. As a resulty Dogan was born into freedom.

Dogan was the third of six children and was raised in poverty. In 1869, his family moved to Holly Springs, Mississippi so the children would have access to a school. Dogan paid for his primary and secondary education by working as a bootblack in his father's barbershop.

Dogan enrolled in Shaw University, later known as Rust College, in Holly Springs. After completing preparatory courses, he left college and taught school and started a grocery business. After earning enough money over two years, he returned to Shaw University and graduated as valedictorian with an A.B. in mathematics in 1886. While in college, he joined Phi Beta Sigma.

== Career ==
In 1887, Dogan joined the faculty of Shaw University. In 1892, he became a mathematics professor at Central Tennessee College, later known as Walden College, in Nashville, Tennessee.

Dogan became the seventh president of Wiley College in Marshall, Texas in 1896. He was recommended for the position by Bishop J. C. Hartzell, then secretary of the Freedmen's Aid Society. During his presidency, Dogan helped Wiley to become one of the best African American colleges in the United States. He oversaw the addition of five buildings and a Carnegie library. The first added building, Central Building, was constructed by the students, who also made the bricks.

Dogan expanded the college's enrollment and course offerings and added a Ph.D. program and law, nursing, and theology degrees. He saw the college through the accreditation process with the Southern Association of Colleges and Schools. He also created the Southern Athletic Conference, with Wiley College as a founding member. Dogan retired as president emeritus in 1942, after serving as president for 46 years. He was called "the Dean of Negro education".

Dogan was president of the National Association of Teachers in Colored Schools and the Teachers State Association of Texas. He was the secretary of the Inter-Racial Commission of Texas and a member of the Association for the Study of Negro Life and History, the East Texas Colored Teachers Association, and the National Negro Business League.

== Honors ==
In 1904, Rust College gave an honorary Ph.D. to Dogan. New Orlean University awarded him an honorary Doctor of Divinity in 1910. Dogan also received honorary degrees from Howard University and Walden College. He was a member of the first class of Wiley College National Hall of Fame.

Warmoth T. Gibbs, a professor and later president of North Carolina A&T State University, wrote a biography of Dogan in 1940.

Dogan Hall, a women's dormitory at Wiley University, was named in his honor in 1925. Around 1935, Dogan High School in Faitfield, Texas, was named in his honor. Matthew W. Dogan Elementary in Houston, Texas, was named in his honor in 1949. Dogan Annex at Wiley University was named in his honor in 1960. In 1962, Matthew W. Dogan Middle School in Tyler, Texas was also named in his honor.

== Personal life ==
Dogan married Fannie Forest Faulkner on July 21, 1888. She was a teacher from Memphis, Tennessee. The couple had seven children, five of whom survived childhood, including Matthew W. Dogan Jr., Blanche Dogan, Clara R. Dogan, Lucille Dogan, and Ruth Dogan. In 1915, Dogan owned property in Marshall worth $7,000. Fannie died in 1929.

He was a member of the Knights of Pythias and was an advisory member of the State Charities Committee. He was a member of the Methodist Episcopal Church, serving on its board of education and as a delegate to its national conference in 1904, 1908, and 1912. He was a delegate to the National Y.M.C.A. Council. He was also president of the Standard Mutual Fire Insurance Company.

After he retired, Dogan lived in a home near the Wiley campus in Marshall. Dogan died on June 17, 1947, at his home in Marshall, Texas, after a brief illness. He was buried in the Wiley College Cemetery in Marshall.
