= Rust College =

Historically black college in Holly Springs, Mississippi, US

- Seal of Rust College
- Former names: Shaw University (1870–1892); Rust University (1892–1915)
- Motto: By Their Fruits Ye Shall Know Them
- Type: Private historically black college
- Established: 1866; 160 years ago
- Affiliations: UNCF
- Religious affiliation: United Methodist Church
- Endowment: $43.4 million (2019)
- President: Johnny M. Moore
- Students: 429
- Location: Holly Springs, Mississippi, United States; 34.774746°N 89.44829°W
- Colors: Royal Blue & White
- Nickname: Bearcats
- Sporting affiliations: NAIA – HBCUAC
- Website: www.rustcollege.edu

Rust College is a private historically black college in Holly Springs, Mississippi. Founded in 1866, it is the second-oldest private college in the state. Affiliated with the United Methodist Church, it is one of ten historically black colleges and universities (HBCUs) founded before 1868 that are still operating.

== History ==
One of the oldest colleges for African Americans in the United States, Rust was founded on November 24, 1866, by Northern missionaries with a group called the Freedman's Aid Society of the Methodist Episcopal Church. In 1870, the college was chartered as Shaw University in 1870, honoring the Reverend S. O. Shaw, who made a gift of $10,000 to the institution which, adjusted for inflation, is the equivalent of approximately $250000 in 2025.

In 1892, to avoid confusion with Shaw University in Raleigh, North Carolina, the institution changed its name to Rust University—a tribute to Rev. Richard S. Rust of Cincinnati, Ohio, a preacher, abolitionist, and the secretary of the Freedmen's Aid Society, who helped found the college. In 1915, the institution assumed the name Rust College. Rust College is the oldest of the 11 historically black colleges and universities associated with The United Methodist Church, the second oldest private college in Mississippi.

The college welcomed a new president, Ivy Taylor, on June 1, 2020. He was succeeded by Johnny Moore.

== Academics ==
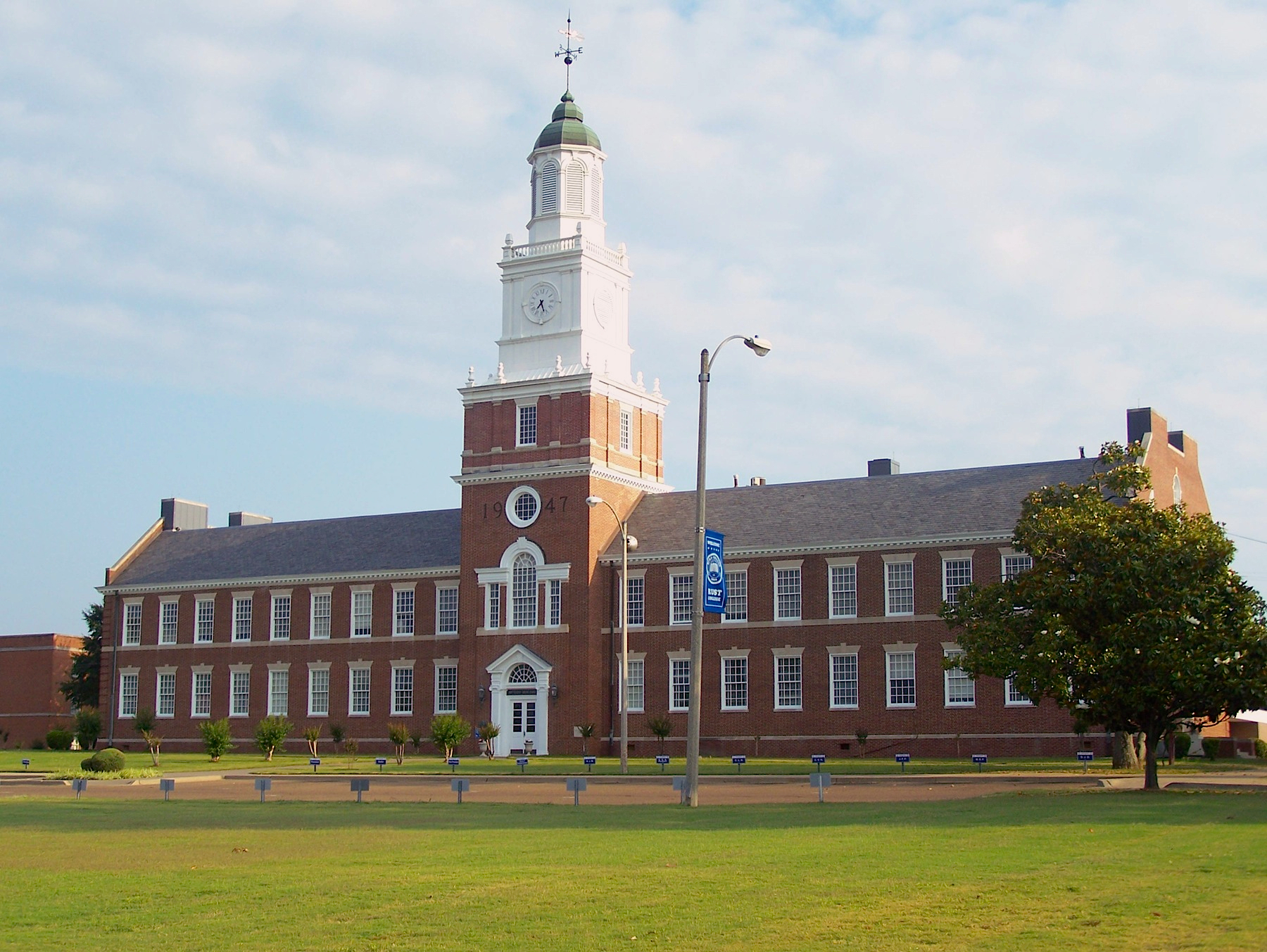
McCoy Administration Building on the Rust College campus

Rust College maintains five divisions or departments of study: Division of Education, Division of Humanities, Division of Science and Mathematics, Division of Social Sciences, and the Division of Business. Degree programs are offered in 16 areas of study. Upon completion of their studies at Rust, students can receive associates or bachelor's degrees.

Rust College operates on what is called a module system, which is an 8-week semester class system that allows the college to constantly enroll a steady stream of transfer students every 8 weeks.

== Campus ==
Rust College occupies approximately 126 acres (51 ha). Some buildings on campus were erected in the mid-1800s, such as the alumni and public relations center. Others were recently built, such as the Hamilton Science Center, a three-story addition to the McDonald Science Building. In 2008, Rust College acquired the campus of the former Mississippi Industrial College, located adjacent to the campus.

In 2011, the college acquired Airliewood, an antebellum former slave plantation estate located near Rust College campus. Built in 1858, Airliewood served as living quarters for Ulysses S. Grant during the Civil War, and currently serves as the official residence of the college president. There are five gender-segregated dorms, with about 900 spaces. Two historic markers honoring the Council of Federated Organizations and those involved in the 1964 Freedom Summer Project in Holly Springs were unveiled on campus in 2014.

== Students ==
About 70% of students are in a traditional age range of 18 to 21, and 10% are age 25 or older. About 35% of students are from Mississippi, 30% from Tennessee, and 15% from Illinois.

== Athletics ==
The Rust athletic teams are called the Bearcats. The college is a member of the National Association of Intercollegiate Athletics (NAIA), primarily competing in the HBCU Athletic Conference (HBCUAC), formerly the Gulf Coast Athletic Conference (GCAC), since the 2018–19 academic year, after spending as an NAIA Independent within the Association of Independent Institutions (AII) during the 2017–18 school year when they joined the NAIA. The Bearcats previously competed in the NCAA Division III ranks as an NCAA D-III Independent until after the 2016–17 school year; and in the Southern Intercollegiate Athletic Conference (SIAC) from 1978–79 to 1987–88, which is currently an NCAA Division II athletic conference.

For certain single sports, the Rust Bearcats softball team competed in the defunct D-III Great South Athletic Conference (GSAC) as an affiliate member from 2013–14 to 2014–15.

Rust competes in 11 intercollegiate varsity sports: Men's sports include baseball, basketball, cross country, tennis and track & field (outdoor); while women's sports include basketball, cross country, softball, tennis, track & field (outdoor) and volleyball.

=== Accomplishments ===
In 1984, the women's basketball team won their first national championship with a 51-49 win over Elizabethtown College.

== Notable alumni ==
Following are some of the notable alumni of Rust College, with year of graduation.

- Larry Anderson, basketball coach for MIT
- Charles Banks, bank founder and businessman, early resident of Mound Bayou
- David Beckley (1967), president of Rust College and Wiley College
- Lucie Campbell, composer, hymnwriter
- Alvin Childress, actor
- Matthew W. Dogan (1886), president of Wiley College
- Melerson Guy Dunham, educator, civil and women's right activist, historian
- Ruby Elzy, operatic soprano
- Amos T. Hall, lawyer, judge, and civil rights leader
- Perry Wilbon Howard , assistant U.S. attorney general, Mississippi Republican chairman
- Leslie B. McLemore, civil rights activist, political scientist, interim mayor of Jackson, Mississippi
- Godwin Maduka, MD and founder of Las Vegas Pain Institute and Medical Center
- Helen Caldwell Day Riley, book author and hospitality house founder in the Catholic Worker tradition
- Alexander Preston Shaw, Methodist bishop
- Anita Ward, disco singer
- Ida B. Wells, newspaper editor, activist, cofounder of the NAACP
- Willie Mitchell, record executive, musician, producer
- Susie Revels Cayton, activist, journalist, editor, writer
