= Melvin B. Tolson =

American poet, educator and politician (1898–1966)

- Born: Melvin Beaunorus Tolson; February 6, 1898; Moberly, Missouri, United States
- Died: August 29, 1966 (aged 68); Dallas, Texas, United States
- Burial place: Guthrie, Oklahoma
- Education: Lincoln University; Columbia University
- Occupation: Poet

Melvin Beaunorus Tolson (February 6, 1898 – August 29, 1966) was an American poet, educator, columnist, and politician. As a poet, he was influenced both by Modernism and the language and experiences of African Americans, and he was deeply influenced by his study of the Harlem Renaissance.

As a debate coach at the historically black Wiley College in Marshall, Texas, Tolson led a team that pioneered interracial college debates against white colleges in the segregated South. This work was depicted in the 2007 biopic The Great Debaters, produced by Oprah Winfrey, starring and directed by Denzel Washington as Tolson.

== Early life and education ==
Born in Moberly, Missouri, Tolson was one of four children of Reverend Alonzo Tolson, a Methodist minister, and Lera (Hurt) Tolson, a seamstress. Alonzo Tolson was of mixed race, the son of an enslaved woman and her white master. He served at various churches in the Missouri and Iowa area until settling longer in Kansas City. Reverend Tolson studied throughout his life to add to the limited education he had first received, even taking Latin, Greek and Hebrew by correspondence courses. Both parents emphasized education for their children.

Melvin Tolson graduated from Lincoln High School in Kansas City in 1919. He enrolled at Fisk University, but the following year transferred to Lincoln University in Pennsylvania for financial reasons. He graduated with honors in 1923. He became a Man of the Omega Psi Phi fraternity.

== Marriage and family ==
In 1922, Tolson married Ruth Southall (1896-1982) of Charlottesville, Virginia, whom he had met as a student at Lincoln University. Their first child was Melvin Beaunorus Tolson Jr. (1923-2011), who became a doctor and a professor at the University of Oklahoma. He was followed by Arthur Lincoln Tolson (1924-2015), who became a professor at Southern University; Wiley Wilson Tolson (1927-1993), who became a doctor; and Ruth Marie Tolson (1928-1976).

== Career ==
After graduation from Lincoln, Tolson and his wife moved to Marshall, Texas, where he taught speech and English at Wiley College (1924–1947). The small, historically black Methodist Episcopal college had a high reputation among blacks in the South and Tolson became one of its stars.

In 1930–31, Tolson took a leave of absence from teaching to study for a Master's degree at Columbia University. His thesis project, "The Harlem Group of Negro Writers," was based on his extensive interviews with members of the Harlem Renaissance. His poetry was strongly influenced by his time in New York. He completed his work and was awarded the master's degree in 1940.

In addition to teaching English at Wiley, Tolson built an award-winning debate team, the Wiley Forensic Society, which became a pioneer in interracial collegiate debates. Beginning in 1930, the team debated against law students from the University of Michigan in Chicago. In 1931, the team participated in the first known interracial collegiate debate in the South, against Oklahoma City University. During a tour in 1935, they competed against the top-ranked team of University of Southern California, which they defeated.

At Wiley, Tolson also co-founded the black intercollegiate Southern Association of Dramatic and Speech Arts and directed the theater club. He coached the junior varsity football team.

Tolson mentored students such as James Farmer and Heman Sweatt, each of whom later became civil rights activists. He encouraged his students not only to be well-rounded people but to stand up for their rights. This was a controversial position in the segregated U.S. South of the early and mid-20th century, when Jim Crow laws predominated and blacks were effectively disenfranchised.

In 1947, Tolson began teaching at Langston University, a historically black college in Langston, Oklahoma, where he worked for the next 17 years. He was a dramatist and director of the Dust Bowl Theater at the university. One of his students at Langston was Nathan Hare, the black studies pioneer and founding publisher of the journal The Black Scholar.

In 1947, Liberia appointed Tolson its Poet Laureate. In 1953, he completed a major epic poem in honor of the nation's centennial, the Libretto for the Republic of Liberia.

Tolson entered local politics and served three terms as mayor of Langston, Oklahoma, from 1954 to 1960.

In 1947, Tolson was accused of having been active in organizing farm laborers and tenant farmers during the late 1930s (though the nature of his activities is unclear) and of having radical leftist associations.

Tolson was a man of impressive intellect who created poetry that was "funny, witty, humoristic, slapstick, rude, cruel, bitter, and hilarious," as reviewer Karl Shapiro described the Harlem Gallery. The poet Langston Hughes, who like Tolson was a Lincoln University alumnus, described him as "the most famous Negro professor in the Southwest" and "a poet of no mean ability" who could connect with students from various walks of life: "Kids from the cottonfields like him. Cowpunchers understand him. ... It is not just English he teaches, but character, and manhood, and womanhood, and love, and courage, and pride."

In 1965, Tolson was appointed to a two-year term at Tuskegee Institute, where he was Avalon Poet. He died after cancer surgery in Dallas, Texas, on August 29, 1966. He was buried in Guthrie, Oklahoma.

== Literary works ==
From 1930 on, Tolson began writing poetry. He also wrote two plays by 1937, although he did not continue to work in this genre.

From October 1937 to June 1944, Tolson wrote a column for The Washington Tribune that he called "Cabbage and Caviar"; a selection of the columns, in a volume also titled Caviar and Cabbage, edited and with an introduction by Robert M. Farnsworth, was published by the University of Missouri Press in 1982.

In 1941, Tolson published his poem "Dark Symphony" in the Atlantic Monthly. Some critics believe it is his greatest work, in which he compared and contrasted African-American and European-American history.

In 1944, Tolson published his first poetry collection, Rendezvous with America, which includes Dark Symphony. He was especially interested in historic events that had fallen into obscurity.

Tolson's Libretto for the Republic of Liberia (1953), another major work, is in the form of an epic poem in an eight-part, rhapsodic sequence. It is considered a major modernist work.

Tolson's final work to appear in his lifetime, the long poem Harlem Gallery, was published in 1965. The poem consists of several sections, each beginning with a letter of the Greek alphabet. The poem concentrates on African-American life. It was a striking change from his first works, and was composed in a jazz style, with quick changes and intellectually dense, rich allusions.

In 1979, a collection of Tolson's poetry was published posthumously, entitled A Gallery of Harlem Portraits. These were poems written during his year in New York, and they represented a mixture of various styles, including short narratives in free verse. This collection was influenced by the loose form of Edgar Lee Masters' Spoon River Anthology. An urban, racially diverse and culturally rich community is presented in A Gallery of Harlem Portraits.

With increasing interest in Tolson and his literary period, in 1999 the University of Virginia published a collection of his poetry entitled Harlem Gallery and Other Poems of Melvin B. Tolson, edited by Raymond Nelson.

Tolson's papers are housed at the Library of Congress.

== Legacy and honors ==
- Fellowship to Columbia University, 1930–31.
- 1947, Liberia named Tolson its poet laureate.
- 1954, appointed permanent fellow in poetry and drama at the Bread Loaf Writers' Conference at Middlebury College in Middlebury, Vermont.
- 1964, elected to the New York Herald Tribune book-review board, and the District of Columbia presented him with a citation and Award for Cultural Achievement in the Fine Arts.
- 1964, grant from the National Institute.
- 1966, annual poetry award of the American Academy of Arts and Letters.
- 1970, Langston University founded the Melvin B. Tolson Black Heritage Center in his honor, to collect material of Africans, African Americans, and the African diaspora.
- 2004, inducted posthumously into Oklahoma Higher Education Hall of Fame.
- 2007, a biographical film, The Great Debaters, was released.

== See also ==
- The Great Debaters
- Inspirational/motivational instructors/mentors portrayed in films
- List of poets from the United States
