= David Beckley =

American college president (born c. 1946)

- Born: David L. Beckley c. 1946; Shannon, Mississippi, US
- Occupations: Academic administrator and college president

Academic background
- Education: Rust College, B.A. 1967; University of Mississippi, M.A. 1975 and Ph.D. 1986

Academic work
- Discipline: Higher education administration
- Institutions: Rust College; Wiley College

David L. Beckley (born c. 1946) is an African American academic administrator. He was the president of Rust College and Wiley College.

== Early life ==
Beckley was born in Shannon, Mississippi in 1946. He earned a Bachelor of Arts in social science from Rust College in Holly Springs, Mississippi in 1967. He was a third-generation graduate of Rust College.

He the received a intership in higher education with the Ford Foundation. However, he was drafted and served in Vietnam from 1970 to 1971 with the United States Army. He then attended the University of Mississippi, receiving a Master of Arts in 1975 and Ph.D. in 1986 in higher education administration.

== Career ==
Between receiving his master's and Ph.D., Beckley worked at Rust College as the director of public relations and director of development; he was its interim chief executive officer for six months in 1984. He became the twelfth president of Wiley College in Marshall, Texas from 1987 to July 1993. On July 15, 1993, he became the eleventh president of Rust College. He was installed as president on November 20, 1993. Under his leadership, the college's endowment has grown from $13 million to $36 million. After 26 years, he retired in 2020.

Beckley served as president of the Mississippi Association of Colleges and the National Association of Schools and Colleges of the United Methodist Church. He was chair of the Mississippi Association of Independent Colleges and the Member Presidents of the United Negro College Fund. He served on the NCAA Division III Presidents Council, the Commission on Colleges of the Southern Association of Colleges and Schools, and was vice chair of the University Senate of the United Methodist Church.

== Honors ==
- Service Award, National Collegiate Athletic Association
- President of the Year, National Association of African American Honors Programs
- Silver Beaver Award, Boy Scouts of America
- Outstanding Education Alumni Award, University of Mississippi School of Education
- Outstanding Alumni Achievement Award, National Association for Equal Opportunity in Higher Education
- Citizen of the Year, Omega Psi Phi

== Personal life ==
Beckley's wife, Gemma D. Beckley, is a member of the social work faculty at Rust College. They have two daughters.

Beckley was served on the Mississippi Civil Rights Museum Commission and the Mississippi Access for Justice Commission. He was board chair of the Mississippi Institute of Arts and Letters and a board member of the CREATE Foundation, the Yocona Area Council Boy Scouts of America, and the Methodist LeBonheur Healthcare.

Beckley is a member and former board member of Asbury United Methodist Church in Holly Springs, Mississippi. He is the chair of the Standing Rules Committee and fomer chair of the Petition and Resolutions Committee of the Mississippi Conference of The United Methodist Church. Beckley belongs to Alpha Phi Omega, Omega Psi Phi, PDK International, and Sigma Pi Phi. He is a 33 degree Mason.
