= Willie Pearson Jr. =

American sociologist (born 1945)

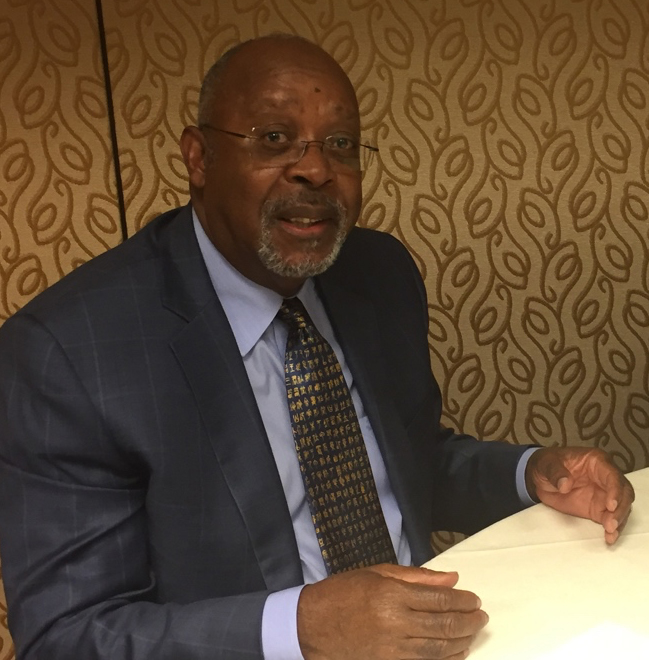
- Pearson in 2017
- Born: Willie Pearson; 29 June 1945 (age 81); Rusk, Texas
- Education: Wiley College; Atlanta University; Southern Illinois University Carbondale
- Known for: Studies and encouragement of African-American scientists
- Scientific career
- Fields: Sociology; History
- Workplaces: Grambling State University; Wake Forest University; Georgia Institute of Technology
- Thesis: One in a hundred: a study of black American science doctorates (1980)

Willie Pearson Jr. is an American sociologist, who has studied and encouraged the participation of African-Americans and other minorities, as well as women, in science. He has published several books on the experience of African-American scientists with PhDs, including major studies on chemists and engineers. Pearson has had a leading role in many activities and policy development roles in relation to the participation of minorities and women in science, including chairing the Committee on Equal Opportunities in Science and Engineering (CEOSE), a congressionally mandated committee at the National Science Foundation (NSF). He served on the U.S. president's Board of Advisors on Historically Black Colleges and Universities.

== Early life and education ==
Willie Pearson was born in Rusk, Texas on 29 June 1945. After his parents divorced, he and his older sister, Vassie King, were raised by their mother. He attended Emmett J. Scott High School in Tyler, Texas, going on to study at the small, historically black, liberal arts college, Wiley College and graduating with a B.A. in sociology in 1968. In 1971, Pearson earned his master's degree in sociology from Atlanta University.

Pearson later undertook doctoral research at the Southern Illinois University at Carbondale, gaining his PhD in 1980/81 with the dissertation, One in a hundred: a study of black American science doctorates. He undertook postdoctoral studies at the Educational Testing Service (ETS) and the U.S. Congress' Office of Technology Assessment (OTA).

== Career ==
After completing his master's degree, Pearson briefly worked for the Department of Health, Education and Welfare and the U.S. Army in Kansas City, Missouri. In 1972, he was appointed to the sociology faculty of Grambling State University in Louisiana. In 1980, Pearson joined Wake Forest University in North Carolina.

In 2001, he was appointed to professor and chair of the Department of History and Sociology at the Georgia Institute of Technology in Atlanta. Soon after, Pearson chaired the U.S. Congress mandated the establishment of the Committee on Equal Opportunities in Science and Engineering (CEOSE), a congressionally mandated committee in the National Science Foundation (NSF) which reports biennially to the U.S. Congress.

In 2010, President Barack Obama appointed Pearson to his re-established Board of Advisors on Historically Black Colleges and Universities. He has also served on committees and advisory boards and panels for the National Institutes of Health (NIH), National Science Foundation (NSF), the American Chemical Society (ACS), the American Sociological Association (ASA), and the National Academies of Science, Engineering, and Medicine (NASEM).

== Honors and awards ==
- Congressional Fellowship, Morris K. Udall Award, U.S. Office of Technology Assessment (1988–1989).
- Donald O. Schoonmaker Faculty Award for Community Service (2000) for contributions to the Wake Forest University campus community.
- Sigma Xi (Scientific Research Honor Society) Distinguished Lecturer (2001–2002).
- National Associate of the National Academies of Sciences (2001).

== Books ==
- Black Scientists, White Society, and Colorless Science: a Study of Universalism in American Science (1985)
- Blacks, Science, and American Education (1989) (with H. Kenneth Bechtel)
- Who Will Do Science? Educating the Next Generation (1994)
- Beyond Small Numbers: Voices of African American PhD Chemists (2005)
- Changing the Face of Engineering: The African American Experience (2015) (Edited with John Brooks Slaughter and Yu Tao)
- Advancing Women in Science: An International Perspective (2015) (Edited with Lisa Frehill and Connie McNeely)
