= The Great Debaters =

2007 film by Denzel Washington

- Theatrical release poster
- Directed by: Denzel Washington
- Screenplay by: Robert Eisele
- Story by: Robert Eisele; Jeffrey Porro
- Produced by: Todd Black; Kate Forte; Joe Roth; Oprah Winfrey
- Starring: Denzel Washington; Forest Whitaker; Nate Parker; Jurnee Smollett; Denzel Whitaker; John Heard; Kimberly Elise
- Cinematography: Philippe Rousselot
- Edited by: Hughes Winborne
- Music by: Peter Golub; James Newton Howard
- Production company: Harpo Productions
- Distributed by: Metro-Goldwyn-Mayer; The Weinstein Company
- Release dates: December 11, 2007 (Cinerama Dome); December 25, 2007 (United States)
- Running time: 126 minutes
- Country: United States
- Language: English
- Budget: $15 million
- Box office: $30.2 million

The Great Debaters is a 2007 American historical drama film directed by Denzel Washington from a screenplay by Robert Eisele and based on a 1997 article for American Legacy by Tony Scherman. The film follows the trials and tribulations of the Wiley College debate team in 1935 Texas. It stars Washington, Forest Whitaker, Denzel Whitaker, Kimberly Elise, Nate Parker, Gina Ravera, Jermaine Williams, and Jurnee Smollett. The Great Debaters was released in theaters on December 25, 2007 to positive critical reception.

== Plot ==
Based on a true story, the plot revolves around the efforts of debate coach Melvin B. Tolson at Wiley College, a historically black college related to the Methodist Episcopal Church, South (now The United Methodist Church), to place his team on equal footing with whites in the American South during the 1930s. Jim Crow laws enforced racial discrimination and lynch mobs were still a risk for African Americans. The Wiley team eventually succeeds to the point where they debate a Harvard University team.

The movie explores racial social issues in Texas during the Great Depression, from the day-to-day insults that African Americans endured to the risk of lynchings. The activist James Farmer is portrayed; at the age of 14, he was admitted to Wiley and selected for its debate team after completing high school. (He later co-founded the Congress of Racial Equality). Another character on the debate team, Samantha Booke, is based on Henrietta Bell Wells, an acclaimed poet and the only female member of the 1930 Wiley team. She participated in the first collegiate interracial debate in the US.

The key line of dialogue, used several times, is a famous paraphrase of theologian St. Augustine of Hippo: "An unjust law is no law at all". (Martin Luther King, Jr. later made this the central thesis of his "Letter from a Birmingham Jail").

Another major line, repeated in slightly different versions according to context, suggests doing what you "have to do" in order that we "can do" what we "want to do." In all instances, these vital lines are spoken by the characters of teenager James L. Farmer and his father James L. Farmer Sr, who taught at Wiley.

== Historical notes ==
The film depicts the Wiley Debate team beating Harvard College in the 1930s. The real Wiley team instead defeated the University of Southern California, which at the time was the reigning debating champion. Wiley was not allowed to officially call itself champion, despite defeating the reigning champion, because it was not a full member of the debate society; Black people were not admitted until after World War II.

To prepare for their roles, director Denzel Washington sent actors in the film to Texas Southern University for a "mini camp" on how to debate with the accomplished TSU debate team and its founding coach, Thomas Freeman.

== Cast ==
- Denzel Washington as Melvin B. Tolson
- Forest Whitaker as James L. Farmer Sr.
- Nate Parker as Henry Lowe
- Jurnee Smollett as Samantha Booke
- Denzel Whitaker as James L. Farmer Jr.
- Jermaine Williams as Hamilton Burgess
- Gina Ravera as Ruth Tolson
- John Heard as Sheriff Dozier
- Kimberly Elise as Pearl Farmer
- Devyn A. Tyler as Helen Farmer
- Trenton McClain Boyd as Nathaniel Farmer
- Jackson Walker as Pig Owner
- Tim Parati as Pig Farmer
- Justice Leak as Harland Osbourne
- Robert X. Golphin as Dunbar Reed
- Damien Leake as Wilson
- Frank L. Ridley as Security Guard
- Glen Powell as Preston Whittington

== Release ==
The Great Debaters was released in theaters on December 25, 2007.

The release of the film coincided with a nationally stepped-up effort by urban debate leagues to get hundreds of inner-city and financially challenged schools to establish debate programs. Cities of focus included Denver, Philadelphia, and San Francisco.

On December 19, 2007, Denzel Washington announced a $1 million donation to Wiley College so they could re-establish their debate team. June 2007, after completing filming at Central High School, Grand Cane, Louisiana, Washington donated $10,000 to Central High School.

== Home media ==
The Great Debaters was released on DVD on May 13, 2008.

== Reception ==
=== Box office ===
The Great Debaters debuted at No. 11 in its first weekend with a total of $6,005,180 from 1,171 venues. The film grossed $30,236,407 in the US.

=== Critical response ===
On the review aggregator website Rotten Tomatoes, 80% of 132 critics' reviews are positive. The website's consensus reads: "A wonderful cast and top-notch script elevate The Great Debaters beyond a familiar formula for a touching, uplifting drama." Metacritic reported the film had an average score of 65 out of 100 based on reviews from 32 critics.

Carrie Rickey of The Philadelphia Inquirer named it the 5th best film of 2007 and Roger Ebert of the Chicago Sun-Times named it the 9th best film of 2007.

Some critics have criticized the film for "playing it safe." John Monaghan of the Detroit Free Press stated, "Serious moviegoers, especially those attracted by the movie's aggressive Oscar campaign, will likely find the package gorgeously wrapped, but intellectually empty."

Motion picture-historian Leonard Maltin, however, hailed the movie as "Inspiring...plays with the facts but, despite its at-times-formulaic storytelling, shows us how education and determination can help ordinary people surmount even the most formidable obstacles."

== Accolades ==
- Won: Image Award for Outstanding Motion Picture
- Won: Image Award for Outstanding Actor in a Motion Picture: Denzel Washington
- Won: Image Award for Outstanding Actress in a Motion Picture: Jurnee Smollett
- Won: Image Award for Outstanding Supporting Actor in a Motion Picture: Forest Whitaker(N), Nate Parker(N), Denzel Whitaker(W)
- Won: Stanley Kramer Award
- Nominated: Golden Globe Award for Best Motion Picture – Drama
- Nominated: Image Award for Outstanding Director in a Motion Picture: Denzel Washington
- Nominated: Golden Reel Award for Best Music Sound Editing in a Feature Film

== Soundtrack ==
The songs for the soundtrack to the film were hand-picked by Denzel Washington from over 1000 candidates. It contains remakes of traditional blues and gospel songs from the 1920s and 1930s by artists including Sharon Jones, Alvin Youngblood Hart, David Berger, and the Carolina Chocolate Drops. It features favorites, such as "Step It Up and Go", "Nobody's Fault But Mine", and the Duke Ellington classic, "Delta Serenade". Varèse Sarabande released a separate album of the film's score, composed by James Newton Howard and Peter Golub.

The complete soundtrack album includes the following songs:

Track listing

1. "My Soul is a Witness" – Alvin "Youngblood" Hart & Sharon Jones
2. "That's What My Baby Likes" – Sharon Jones, Alvin Youngblood Hart & Teenie Hodges
3. "I've Got Blood in My Eyes for You" – The Carolina Chocolate Drops & Alvin "Youngblood" Hart
4. "Step It Up and Go" – Alvin "Youngblood" Hart & Teenie Hodges
5. "It's Tight Like That" – Sharon Jones, Alvin Youngblood Hart & Teenie Hodges
6. "Busy Bootin'" – Alvin "Youngblood" Hart & The Carolina Chocolate Drops
7. "City of Refuge" – Alvin "Youngblood" Hart & The Carolina Chocolate Drops
8. "Two Wings" – Alvin "Youngblood" Hart, Sharon Jones w/Billy Rivers and the Angelic Voices of Faith
9. "Delta Serenade" – David Berger & The Sultans of Swing
10. "Rock n' Rye" – David Berger & The Sultans of Swing
11. "Wild About That Thing" – Sharon Jones, Alvin Youngblood Hart, & Teenie Hodges
12. "Nobody's Fault but Mine" – Alvin "Youngblood" Hart & The Carolina Chocolate Drops
13. "How Long Before I Change My Clothes" – Alvin "Youngblood" Hart
14. "We Shall Not Be Moved" – Sharon Jones w/Billy Rivers and the Angelic Voices of Faith
15. "Up Above My Head" – Sharon Jones w/Billy Rivers and the Angelic Voices of Faith
16. "The Shout" – Art Tatum
17. "Begrüssung" – Marian Anderson

== Bibliography ==
- Scherman, Tony (Spring 1997). "The Great Debaters" (PDF). American Legacy. Archived from the original (PDF) on July 7, 2011. Original article about Melvin Tolson's Wiley College debate team.
- Bell, Gail K. (December 2007). "Tolson, Farmer intertwined by Wiley debate team". Marshall News Messenger. Archived from the original on June 6, 2009. Another very detailed article on the team and the film.
