= Hydeia Broadbent =

American HIV/AIDS activist (1984–2024)

- Born: Hydeia Loren Broadbent; June 14, 1984; Las Vegas, Nevada, U.S.
- Died: February 20, 2024 (aged 39); Las Vegas, Nevada, U.S.
- Known for: HIV/AIDS activism

Hydeia Loren Broadbent (June 14, 1984 – February 20, 2024) was an American HIV/AIDS activist who advocated through appearances in national media and as a spokesperson for related foundations.

Born with HIV, Broadbent began taking part in trials for treatment of HIV at the age of three. Living with HIV her entire life, she began making appearances to raise awareness of it as a child, notably at the 1996 Republican National Convention. She described the disease as "a life sentence...you'll be taking pills forever, going to the doctor and fighting for insurance forever."

== Early life and education ==
Broadbent was born with undiagnosed HIV in Las Vegas, Nevada, on June 14, 1984. She was initially taken in as a foster child by Loren and Patricia Broadbent who later adopted her. In 1987, the Broadbents learned that Hydeia was HIV positive.

Not much is known about Hydeia's parentage as her birth mother abandoned her at a Las Vegas hospital. Three years later, Hydeia's birth mother gave birth at the same hospital to another child and left him there as well. As HIV testing was required at the time, both mother and child were tested, and the results were positive for HIV. The hospital informed the Broadbents and they had Hydeia tested for HIV shortly afterwards. Her results were also positive for HIV.

Her adoptive mother signed her up for a research trial in hopes of finding a treatment that would work for Hydeia. Growing up, Hydeia regularly had blood infections, pneumonia, and fungal infections in her brain. It was predicted that she would not survive childhood, and would die at the age of five. Despite all predictions, she survived. However, when she was five, she developed AIDS.

She began attending school in seventh grade and attended Odyssey Charter High School in Las Vegas from home using a computer.

== Life and activism ==
Broadbent began her activism at age six by speaking about living with HIV/AIDS. She initially got involved with speaking on the subject through Elizabeth Glaser, the creator of the Elizabeth Glaser Pediatric AIDS Foundation. The two met while Hydeia was undergoing treatment at the National Institutes of Health. Glaser asked Hydeia's mother to let Hydeia speak publicly about having HIV/AIDS and she agreed.

Broadbent went on to speak at many events, including AIDS benefit concerts, documentaries, college campus education events, and talk shows. In 1992, Broadbent appeared on a Nickelodeon special along with Magic Johnson. Two years after the special, she established the Hydeia L. Broadbent Foundation and received a Black Achievement Award from Jet magazine. She appeared in Essence, on The Maury Povich Show, Good Morning America, and at the 1996 Republican National Convention. At the Republican National Convention, she famously stated: "I am the future, and I have AIDS."

In 1996, Broadbent appeared on the Oprah Winfrey Show. She later appeared on Oprah: Where Are They Now?, as she was one of the most-requested guests to be revisited. In 2002, her family published a book titled You Get Past The Tears. The family also appeared on an episode of Extreme Home Makeover in 2004.

In 2012, Broadbent became an honorary member of Sigma Gamma Rho sorority. In 2014, Broadbent was a spokesperson on behalf of the Magic Johnson Foundation and other AIDS activist organizations in order to educate people about HIV/AIDS, raise awareness, and fight discrimination against those living with HIV/AIDS. She was involved in screening drives, along with actress and friend Jurnee Smollett. Broadbent traveled extensively both nationally and internationally to speak to others.

Broadbent took three antiretroviral pills a day and the majority of her medical payments were self-paid. According to Hydeia, "HIV is not a death sentence, but it's a life sentence...[y]ou'll be taking pills forever, going to the doctor and fighting for insurance forever." She hoped that by sharing her story, things would begin to change.

== Death and legacy ==
Broadbent died in Las Vegas on February 20, 2024, at the age of 39. In tribute after her death, Magic Johnson posted a video clip online from a 1992 interview, where both he and Broadbent spoke, with Broadbent, age 7, saying, "I want people to know that we're just normal people," and according to The New York Times, "her face crumpling as she fought through tears", and Johnson telling her, "We are normal people."
