= Barbara Summers =

American fashion model, writer and educator (1944–2014)

- Born: September 6, 1944; Hartford Connecticut , U.S.
- Died: November 2014 (aged 70)
- Education: University of Pennsylvania; Yale University; University of Paris at the Sorbonne
- Occupations: Writer, educator, fashion model
- Spouse: Marc Albert
- Children: Kimson Albert

Barbara Summers (September 6, 1944 – November 2014) was an American writer and educator who had also had a long and successful career as a fashion model, working for 17 years with Ford Models, one of America's top agencies. Her 1998 book, Skin Deep – the story of Black models in America and abroad – is a definitive work on black women in the modeling industry. for which she spent more than a decade interviewing fashion professionals on three continents to record their experiences.

== Biography ==
=== Education and career ===
Barbara Gene Summers was born in Springfield, Massachusetts, to Don and Lucy Summers, the second of her parents' five children. In her own words: "My wonderful, hard-working father used to call me Daughter #2. He and my mother had 4 girls before their one and only son arrived." She grew up in Hartford, Connecticut, where her family moved in 1949. She graduated from Weaver High School in 1963 and then went to the University of Pennsylvania, where she earned a B.A. degree. She subsequently did graduate studies at Yale University and then the University of Paris at the Sorbonne, where she "promptly became a grad school dropout and a lifelong Francophile". After living in Paris, she moved to Puerto Rico and Haiti, staying there for several years with her husband Marc Albert and their son. Back in New York City, she began her career as a model while working as a college instructor, and she latterly returned to academia, teaching at Hostos Community College in the Bronx.

As a writer and editor, she published works including I Dream a World: Portraits of Black Women Who Changed America (1989), Nouvelle Soul: Short Stories (1992), The Price You Pay (a novel set in the world of modeling, 1993), Skin Deep: Inside the World of Black Fashion Models (1998), Black and Beautiful: How Women of Color Changed the Fashion Industry (2001), and Open the Unusual Door: True-Life Stories of Challenge, Adventure, and Success by Black Americans (2005). Her most notable writing is her 1998 book Skin Deep, which explores the role of African-American models within the fashion industry and the emergence of black designers, and "presents a fascinating portrait of black supermodels", including profiles of Dorothea Towles, Beverly Johnson, Iman, Barbara Cheeseborough, and others. The book was described in The Crisis as "an amazingly comprehensive history ... an inspiring read and a delight to own."

Summers wrote of herself: "In the surprising adventure that is my life, I have been a Ford fashion model, a world traveler, a teacher, a writer and editor, a lover, wife, and mother, a sister to several, a good friend to many. I define myself as an artist. Artists are charged with the special responsibility not just to speak truth but to sing it. I believe: *We are all related - literally. *While politicians, terrorists, and maniacs of power strive mightily to prove otherwise, war is not the answer. Love is."

She died unexpectedly in 2014 at the age of 70.

== Personal life ==
Barbara Summers' son is the animator/producer Kimson Albert. She was also survived by her sisters, Lucy Summers and Dona Carter, and brother Don Summers, her elder sister Sandy Head having predeceased her.

== Bibliography ==
- (Editor) Brian Lanker, I Dream a World: Portraits of Black Women Who Changed America, New York: Stewart, Tabori & Chang, 1989.
- Nouvelle Soul: Short Stories, New York: Amistad, 1992.
- The Price You Pay (novel), New York: Amistad, 1993. ISBN 978-1567430479
- Skin Deep: Inside the World of Black Fashion Models, New York: Amistad, 1998.
- Black and Beautiful: How Women of Color Changed the Fashion Industry, New York: Amistad, 2001.
- (Editor and author of introduction) Open the Unusual Door: True-Life Stories of Challenge, Adventure, and Success by Black Americans, Boston, MA: Graphia, 2005.
