= Dorothea Church =

American fashion model

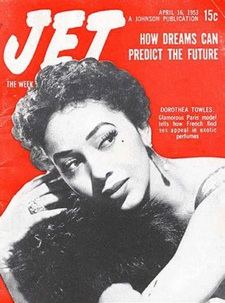
- Dorothea Church on the cover of the April 16, 1953 issue of JET magazine
- Born: Dorthy Mae Towles; July 26, 1922; Texarkana, Texas, U.S.
- Died: July 7, 2006 (aged 83); New York City, U.S.
- Occupation: Model
- Spouses: Dr. Nathaniel Alfonso Fearonce (m. 1947; div. 1950) Thomas Ayres Church (m. 1962; died 2000)
- Partner: Edward Bell (1953–1953)
- Children: 2
- Relatives: Lois Towles (sister)

Dorothea Towles Church (born Dorthy Mae Towles; July 26, 1922 – July 7, 2006) was the first successful black fashion model in Paris.

== Early life ==
Dorthy Mae Towles, as her name is spelled on her birth certificate, was born in Texarkana, Texas. She was a daughter of Thomas Elsworth Towles, then a mechanic, and his wife, the former Anabella Clark. Her siblings were: Thomas, Henry, Lois (who became an internationally renowned concert pianist), Verna, Golden, and Marian.

== Education ==
She attended Paul Laurence Dunbar High School in Texarkana, and then Wiley College in Marshall, Texas, where she received a bachelor's degree in biology and pre-med, graduating cum laude.

In 1943, following the death of her mother, she moved to Los Angeles, California, to live with Dr. Henry H. Towles (1888–1965), a prominent physician and real-estate investor, and his wife Ruth. There she worked as a clerk, secretary, and cashier, until 1945, when she began teaching biology and drama at Jefferson High School in Los Angeles; she also taught, in 1946, at the Holmes Avenue School.

In the summer of 1945, she enrolled in the University of Southern California, studying drama and speech under William DeMille. She also began attending the Dorothy Farrier Charm and Modeling School and was the first black student there. In 1948 she began studying for her Masters of Science degree in education at the University of Southern California, where she was a member of the black women's sorority Alpha Kappa Alpha.

== Modeling career ==
In addition to her work as a teacher in the 1940s, Church began appearing in charity fashion shows on the West Coast, for which she also trained models.

Her sister Lois Towles, later a well-known concert pianist, sang in the Fisk University concert choir during its European tour in 1949, and Church, accompanied by her husband Dr. Nathaniel Fearonce, followed her on a two-month vacation. While in Paris, Church decided to try out for some modeling assignments. Christian Dior hired her to replace one of his regular models who was out on vacation. Her assignment with Dior led to her spending the next five years in France, modeling for Jacques Fath, Elsa Schiaparelli, Pierre Balmain, and Robert Piguet. In April 1953, she was on the cover of Jet, an African-American magazine.

In 1954 she returned to the United States. Despite her success in Europe, she struggled to find work in America as designers were reluctant to hire a black model. She began a tour of black colleges, showcasing her collection of Paris haute couture. Her fashion shows served as fund-raisers for the sorority to which she belonged, Alpha Kappa Alpha.

She later signed as a model with the Grace del Marco agency in New York City and worked as a fashion commentator for radio station WOV.

== Racial barriers ==
Church recalled her experience in Paris of the early 1950s in a 2004 interview for Women's Wear Daily: "For once I was not considered black, African American or Negro. I was just an American." The French fashion establishment "treated you like a queen," she said.

In her 1998 book Black and Beautiful, author Barbara Summers quotes Church about her celebrity status in Paris at the beginning of the 1950s: "I got invited out all the time. I was the only black model in Europe and I just thought I was an international person."

That being said, when Church returned to the United States, Pierre Balmain would not allow her to borrow his designs for an Ebony Magazine shoot out of concern that his white clientele would be offended and that the magazine's readership would not be interested in purchasing Balmain's creations. She therefore felt more accepted in Parisian culture and the modelling industry compared to that in the US.

Dorothea was a successful black model in an industry, and era, which represented beauty through the predominant use of white models. Norma Jean Darden recounted the success of Dorothea, and her ability to break the racial barriers down in the modelling industry at that time.

== Marriages ==
Church was married twice, her husbands being:

- Dr. Nathaniel Alfonso Fearonce (1903–1966), a prominent dentist, as his second wife. They were married at her uncle's home in Los Angeles, California, on August 24, 1947. By this marriage, she had one stepson, Nathaniel Alfonso Fearonce, Jr. Her husband sued for divorce in 1950.
- Thomas Ayres Church (died 2000), a Justice Department lawyer specializing in Chinese immigration; he was a nephew of activist Mary Church Terrell. They were married a civil ceremony in New York City, New York, on July 5, 1962, and a religious ceremony in Paris, France, on December 10, 1962. They had one child, Thomas Ayres Church Jr.

In 1953, her engagement to a Detroit law student, Edward Bell, was announced. The engagement was called off several months later when, a report in Jet magazine noted, "she would not agree to drop her modeling career after the wedding to stay home and do the things a wife should do".

== Death ==
Church died aged 83 at St. Luke's-Roosevelt Hospital Center in New York City. Her death was attributed to heart and kidney disease.

== Legacy ==
She was featured in the Black Style Now exhibition, which opened September 9, 2006, at the Museum of the City of New York.

Thomas Church and Dorothea's son, Thomas, survives them.
