= The Washington Tribune =

The Washington Tribune was an African American weekly newspaper published in Washington, D.C., beginning with its first issue on May 14, 1921 (vol. 1, no. 1), and ceasing publication around 1946. The paper was co-founded by African American newspaperman, William O. Walker, who served as managing editor, and the Murray Brothers Printing Company. James A. G. LuValle served as city editor.

Image 1 of The Washington tribune (Washington, D.C.), May 14, 1921

In the inaugural issue of the Washington Tribune, the publishers stated that the paper was launched on the belief that Washington "can and will well support another first-class, clean-cut, local weekly newspaper." The Washington Tribune was primarily aimed at African American residents of Washington, D.C., though its audience extended beyond the capital. It was distributed by carrier throughout the District for five cents, and was also available at all newsstands and drug stores. The paper covered a broad range of topics including business, sports, theater, and society news, and featured a dedicated sports section documenting, in its own words, "all phases of sports and games." Upon its founding, the paper was endorsed by a wide range of Washington readers, including a photographer, a bank cashier, a church financial secretary, a theater manager, an insurance company manager, and a high school principal, reflecting a readership that spanned professional and civic sectors of the African American community. The Washington Tribune was published in English. Digital holdings are preserved at the Library of Congress (Digital ID: https://hdl.loc.gov/loc.sgp/chronam.sn87062236).
