= Lois Towles =

American musician and activist (1912–1983)

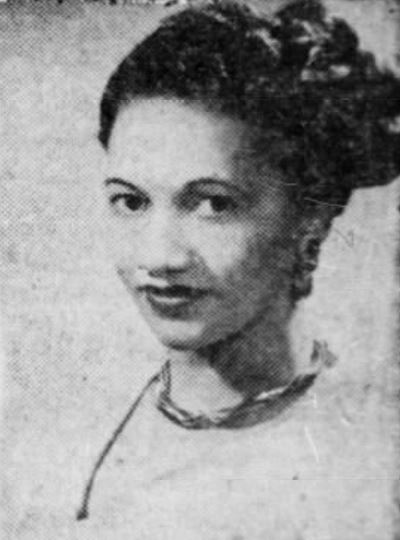
- Towles in 1947
- Born: Lois Bernard Towles; April 4, 1912; Texarkana, Arkansas, U.S.
- Died: March 18, 1983 (aged 70); San Francisco, California, U.S.
- Other names: Lois Caesar, Lois Towles Caesar, Lois Towles McNeely
- Occupations: pianist, music educator, community activist
- Years active: 1933–1983

Lois Towles (April 4, 1912 – March 18, 1983) was an American classical pianist, music educator, and community activist. Born in Texarkana, Arkansas, she grew up in the town straddling the Arkansas and Texas line. From an early age, she was interested in music and began piano lessons at age 9. After graduating as valedictorian of her high school class, she obtained a bachelor's degree from Wiley College in Marshall, Texas, and worked as a high school teacher from 1936 to 1941. In 1942, Towles enrolled in the University of Iowa and earned two master's degrees in 1943. She went on to further her education at Juilliard, the University of California, Berkeley, the Conservatoire de Paris, and the American Conservatory at Fountainebleau.

From 1943 to 1952, Towles was an assistant professor of music at Fisk University in Nashville, Tennessee. She had a distinguished performance career from her debut in 1947 until her retirement in 1966. From 1949 to 1955, she lived between Paris and the United States, traveling between the continents for recitals and modeling engagements. She and her sister, Dorothea Towles Church, became some of the first African-American models to gain an international reputation and Towles was featured in both Ebony and Jet. In 1956, Towles married Richard C. Caesar, a retired combat fighter pilot with the Tuskegee Airmen, San Francisco philanthropist/civic leader, and prominent dentist. He was a member of Tuskegee's sixth cadet graduating class and one of the first 50 African American combat fighter pilots in history. He was notable for being the Arkansas's second-ever African American combat fighter pilot. He is also notable for saving decorated Tuskegee Airman Roscoe Brown from a potentially fatal aircraft crash.

Limiting her touring time after her marriage, as Lois Caesar, she became noted for her community activism, focused on women's and children's issues.

== Early life and education ==
Lois Bernard Towles was born on April 4, 1912, in Texarkana Miller County, Arkansas, to Thomas Elsworth Towles of Alabama and Arabella Clark of Arkansas. She was the fifth of nine siblings, including: Thomas Jr. (born 1906), Delbert (born 1908), Arabella (born 1910), Verna (1911), Henry (1914), Golden (1917), Dorothea (1922), and Marian (1928). Her father worked as a carpenter and contractor. The family moved from the Arkansas side of Texarkana to the Texas side around 1922.

From a young age, Towles was interested in music and pretended that a window sill in their home was a piano, until her parents could afford to purchase a piano for her to play. She began performing at her local church around the age of nine and the following year became the pianist for the church choir. She graduated as valedictorian of her high school class (Note: At the time Towles graduated, schools in Texarkana were fully segregated. There was one high school for black students on the Arkansas side of the city, Booker T. Washington, which opened in 1925 and the other, Colored High School, on the Texas side located on Ash Street. According to Harding, Towles graduated from a high school that was located six blocks from her home.) and entered Wiley College in Marshall. She performed with the Wiley Singers from 1931, joined the sorority Alpha Kappa Alpha, and graduated magna cum laude with a Bachelor of Arts degree in May 1933.

After her graduation, Towles married Rudolph McNeely, a paper hanger and house painter and they made their home in Kilgore. Towles was hired to teach music at the black high school in 1936 and 1937. She was promoted in 1938, and served as the music director for the Gregg County, Texas Negro schools until 1941. Towles left Texas at the end of the school year in 1941 and moved to Iowa, where she earned her Master of Arts degree in seven and a half months and then earned a Master of Fine Arts degree in nine months at the University of Iowa. She completed her studies in 1943 with a thesis The History of Music Education at Wiley College, becoming only the second person to have obtained a Master of Fine Arts degree at the university and the first African-American to have done so. Towles spoke English, French, German, and Spanish.

== Concert career (1943–1966) ==
In October 1943, Towles was hired as an assistant professor in the music department of Fisk University in Nashville, Tennessee. (Note: After publishing her thesis with the name Lois Towles McNeely in December 1943, Towles did not continue to use the surname McNeely. Harding notes that she divorced in the 1950s.) She enrolled in Juilliard to pursue her doctorate, studying under Sascha Gorodnitzki, and was appointed as "artist in residence" at Tennessee State University. She debuted at Tennessee State on October 22, 1947, and the review of Ruth Campbell of The Tennessean compared her performance to that of Arthur Rubinstein, a well-known pianist with an international reputation. Rubinstein offered Towles a free fellowship to study with him at his studio in Hollywood. She spent the summer of 1948 studying with him and took courses at the University of California, Berkeley, while touring to capacity crowds in major cities throughout the South.

Taking a leave of absence from Fisk, in 1949 Towles traveled to Paris to study with Marcel Ciampi, a friend of Rubenstein's who taught at the Conservatoire de Paris. She also studied at the American Conservatory at Fountainebleau with Nadia Boulanger and Robert Casadesus. Besides practicing six to eight hours per day, Towles performed, earning praise for recitals at the American Embassy of Paris, the Opéra-Comique, the Gaveau Salon, and for the United Nations Educational, Scientific and Cultural Organization. Late that year, she performed as the accompanist of the Fisk Jubilee Singers and hosted her sister Dorothea, who would become a model for Christian Dior. The sisters would become some of the first internationally-known high-fashion, black models. Besides Dior, they wore designs from Robert Piguet and were courted by perfumers. Towles appeared in Ebony and Jet, was featured in various fashion magazines, and was a model for the artist, Paul Colin (artist). She designed her own clothes, becoming known for trimming her concert gowns with favorite bars from scores of music.

In early 1950, Towles played in her New York debut at The Town Hall and toured for thirty days throughout the United States. She resigned from Fisk in 1952, and throughout the early 1950s, traveled back and forth between Paris and the United States performing music and developing a fashion show and music platform performance with her sister Dorothea. The sisters hosted many recitals which combined fashion and music for their sorority sisters of Alpha Kappa Alpha. In 1956, while appearing at a concert in San Francisco, she rekindled a friendship with Richard Caesar, whom she had met while she was teaching at Fisk and he was attending dental school. He had established a successful dental practice in San Francisco and soon after meeting again, they married on June 6, 1956. Though she would continue performing for another ten years, after her marriage Towles took the name Lois Towels Caesar and began focusing on community activism and development.

== Community activism (1956–1983) ==
In 1958, Caesar co-sponsored Leontyne Price's debut recital at the San Francisco Opera House and helped establish the Symphony-in-Schools program, to encourage youth in music education She also developed the "Start a Symphony Family" plan to allow people with limited means to participate in cultural events, scholarship programs to assist young people in attaining arts careers, and a work program to allow youths to work as ushers and hostesses of the symphony. Caesar worked with the service organization The Links Incorporated to develop an art program which promoted the works of young artists. From the early 1960s to 1965, she and her sister operated a finishing school in San Francisco, teaching women about etiquette and fashion, but also about building self-confidence. They made presentations across the country at universities and women's organizations and she published the column, "Fashionably Dressed on a Budget" for the Pittsburgh Courier.

In 1965, Caesar became the first black person to serve on the Board of Governors for the San Francisco Symphony and in 1969, she was the first black and woman elected to serve as director of the Symphony Foundation. She officially retired from performing in 1966. Caesar served on the San Francisco grand jury for 1972, and was on the board of the city's Youth Service Bureau and the mayor's youth task force. In 1976, she was appointed to the San Francisco Mayor's Criminal Justice Commission, becoming the first black and woman to serve and became the first minority chosen to chair the commission, serving two terms. She served two terms as the president of the local chapter of the World Adoption International Fund, a children's service organization created by Jane Russell, and was elected president in 1977 of the Women's Auxiliary of the San Francisco Dental Society. In 1978, she was honored with the Jefferson Award for Public Service by the American Institute for Public Service.

== Death and legacy ==
Caesar died on March 18, 1983, at her home in San Francisco. On April 7, 1983, the chapel at the Youth Guidance Center in San Francisco was renamed the Lois Towles Caesar Memorial Chapel in her honor and was dedicated in a ceremony on October 6.
