= Wiley University =

Private historically black college in Marshall, Texas

- Former names: Wiley University (1873–1929); Wiley College (1929–2023)
- Motto: Go Forth Inspired
- Type: Private historically black college
- Established: 1873
- Religious affiliation: United Methodist Church
- Academic affiliations: UNCF; IAMSCU; CIC
- Endowment: $7.4 million
- President: Herman J. Felton Jr.
- Academic staff: 46
- Total staff: 163
- Students: 636
- Location: Marshall, Texas, U.S. 32.5367°N 94.3792°W
- Campus: 134 acres (54 ha); Rural
- Colors: Purple, Black, White & Gray
- Nickname: Wildcats
- Sporting affiliations: NAIA – HBCUAC
- Mascot: Wiley the Wildcat
- Website: wileyc.edu
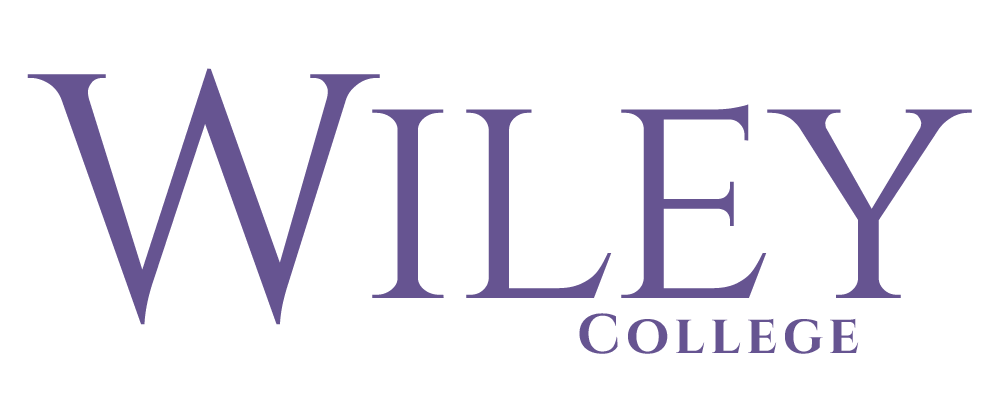

Wiley University (formerly Wiley College) is a private historically black college in Marshall, Texas. Founded in 1873 by the Methodist Episcopal Church's Bishop Isaac Wiley and certified in 1882 by the Freedman's Aid Society, it is one of the oldest predominantly black colleges west of the Mississippi River.

In 2005–2006, on-campus enrollment approached 450, while an off-campus program in Shreveport, Louisiana, for students with some prior college credits who seek to finish a degree, enrolled about 250. By fall of 2006, total enrollment was about 750. By fall of 2013, total enrollment reached over 1,000. Wiley is an open admissions college and about 96% of students receive some financial aid.

The college is known for its debate team. Over a 15-year period, Melvin B. Tolson's debate teams lost only 1 of 75 debates. Wiley's debate team competed against historically black colleges and earned national attention with its 1935 debate against University of Southern California's highly ranked debate team.

On November 3, 2023, Wiley College announced a name change back to Wiley University for the first time since 1929 with the establishment of a new graduate school program to be offered to students beginning in 2024.

== History ==
Wiley University was established in 1873 in Marshall, Texas, by the Freedmen's Aid Society of the Methodist Episcopal Church. It is the oldest historically black college (or institute of higher education) west of the Mississippi River. It was started as both a college and high school.

In 1880, the campus was moved to a seventy-acre plot in downtown Marshall. The former campus location was in south Marshall, near the remaining Wiley College Cemetery. In 1888, Henry B. Pemberton was the first college graduate, he was awarded a B.A. degree.

F.C. Moore was the first president, and for the first twenty years the president and all the faculty and staff, were church missionaries and were White. The first African American president of Wiley University was Isaiah B. Scott, who served from 1893 until 1896; with his election he changed the institutions policy regarding the race of faculty and staff. In 1896, Scott became editor of the Southwest Christian Advocate, and Matthew W. Dogan replaced him as the president, a role he maintained until 1942.

In 1906 a fire destroyed five of the eleven buildings on campus, but they were rebuilt. In 1907, the president’s home and a library on campus were built by students, after president Dogan was able to secure a Carnegie Foundation grant. The library was open to the entire community of Marshall, and it was the only library until 1974. By 1929, the institution no longer supported a high school. During that same year, the university renamed itself as Wiley College.

=== Civil Rights Movement ===
Wiley, along with Bishop College, was instrumental in the Civil Rights movement in Texas. Wiley and Bishop students launched the first sit-ins in Texas in the rotunda of the Old Harrison County Courthouse to protest segregation in public facilities.

James Farmer, son of James L. Farmer, Sr., graduated from Wiley and became one of the "Big Four" of the Civil Rights Movement. Together with Roy Wilkins, Rev. Dr. Martin Luther King Jr., and Whitney M. Young Jr., James Farmer helped organize the first sit-ins and Freedom Rides in the United States.

== Presidents ==
- F. C. Moore, 1873–1876
- W. H. Davis, 1876–1885
- N. D. Clifford, 1885–1888
- George Whitaker, 1888–1889
- P. A. Pool, 1889–1893
- Isaiah B. Scott, 1893–1896; the first African American president
- Matthew W. Dogan, 1896–1942
- E. C. McLeod, 1942–1948
- Julius Sebastian Scott Sr., 1948–1958
- Thomas Winston Cole Sr., 1958–1971
- Robert E. Hayes Sr., 1971–1986
- E.W. Rand (interim), 1986
- David R. Houston (interim), 1987
- David L. Beckley, 1987–1993
- Lamore J. Carter, 1993–1996
- Julius Samuel Scott Jr., 1996–1998
- Ronald L. Swain, 1998–2000
- Haywood L. Strickland, 2000–2018
- Herman J. Felton Jr., 2019–present

== Debate team ==
Tony Scherman's article about the Wiley College debate team for the 1997 Spring issue of American Legacy sparked a renewed interest in its history. The success of the 1935 Wiley College debate team, coached by professor and poet Melvin Tolson, was the subject of a 2005 AMS Pictures documentary, The Great Debaters, The Real Great Debaters of Wiley College, which received heavy play around Texas, followed by the 2007 dramatic movie, The Great Debaters, directed by and starring Denzel Washington. In 1935, the Wiley College debate team defeated the reigning national debate champion, the University of Southern California (depicted as Harvard University in The Great Debaters).

In 2007, Denzel Washington announced a donation of $1 million to Wiley so the team could be re-established. The following year, The Great Debaters movie debuted, starring Washington; the college's debate team has taken this name, too.

In 2014, the 23-person team won 1st place at the Pi Kappa Delta Comprehensive National Tournament. This was the largest Pi Kappa Delta Tournament in their 101-year history. This was the first national speech and debate title won by an HBCU. Three years later, the college led the establishment of the first HBCU National Speech and Debate League. In 2018, Wiley hosted the first HBCU National Speech and Debate League Tournament.

== Athletics ==
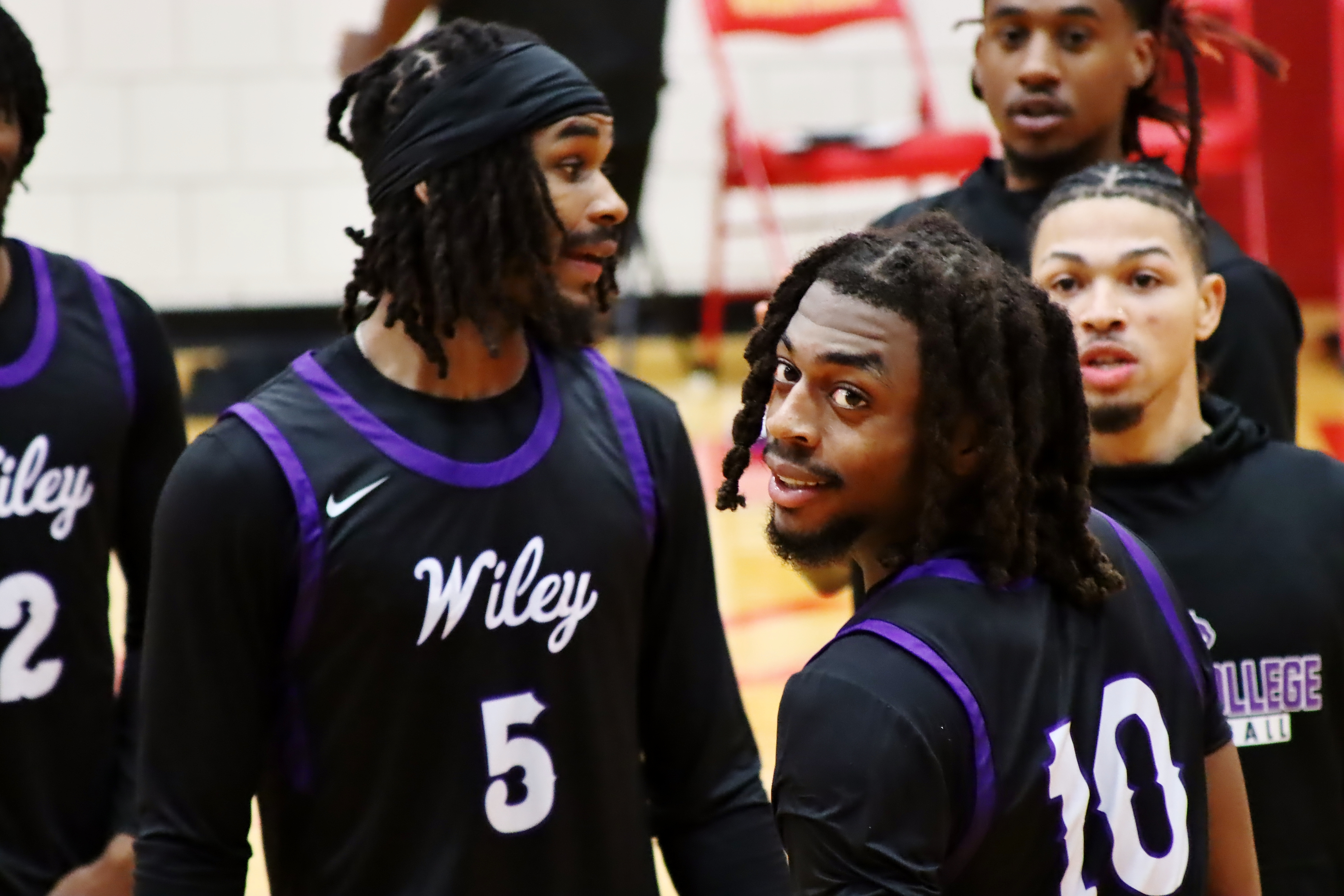
Wiley Wildcats men's basketball

The Wiley athletic teams are called the Wildcats. The college is a member of the National Association of Intercollegiate Athletics (NAIA), primarily competing in the HBCU Athletic Conference (HBCUAC), formerly known as the Gulf Coast Athletic Conference (GCAC), since the 2022–23 academic year. The Wildcats previously competed in the Red River Athletic Conference (RRAC) from 1998–99 to 2021–22. They were also a founding member of the Southwestern Athletic Conference (SWAC) from 1920–21 to 1967–68, which is currently an NCAA Division I FCS athletic conference.

Wiley competes in ten intercollegiate varsity teams: Men's sports include baseball, basketball, cross country, soccer and track & field. Women's sports include basketball, cross country, soccer, track & field and volleyball. Wiley the Wildcat is the mascot. Former sports included cheerleading.

On January 20, 2022, Wiley received an invitation to join the GCAC, along with Oakwood University (from the United States Collegiate Athletic Association (USCAA)) and the return of Southern University at New Orleans (SUNO), effective beginning in July 2022. The GCAC is an athletic conference affiliated with the NAIA.

== Campus gallery ==
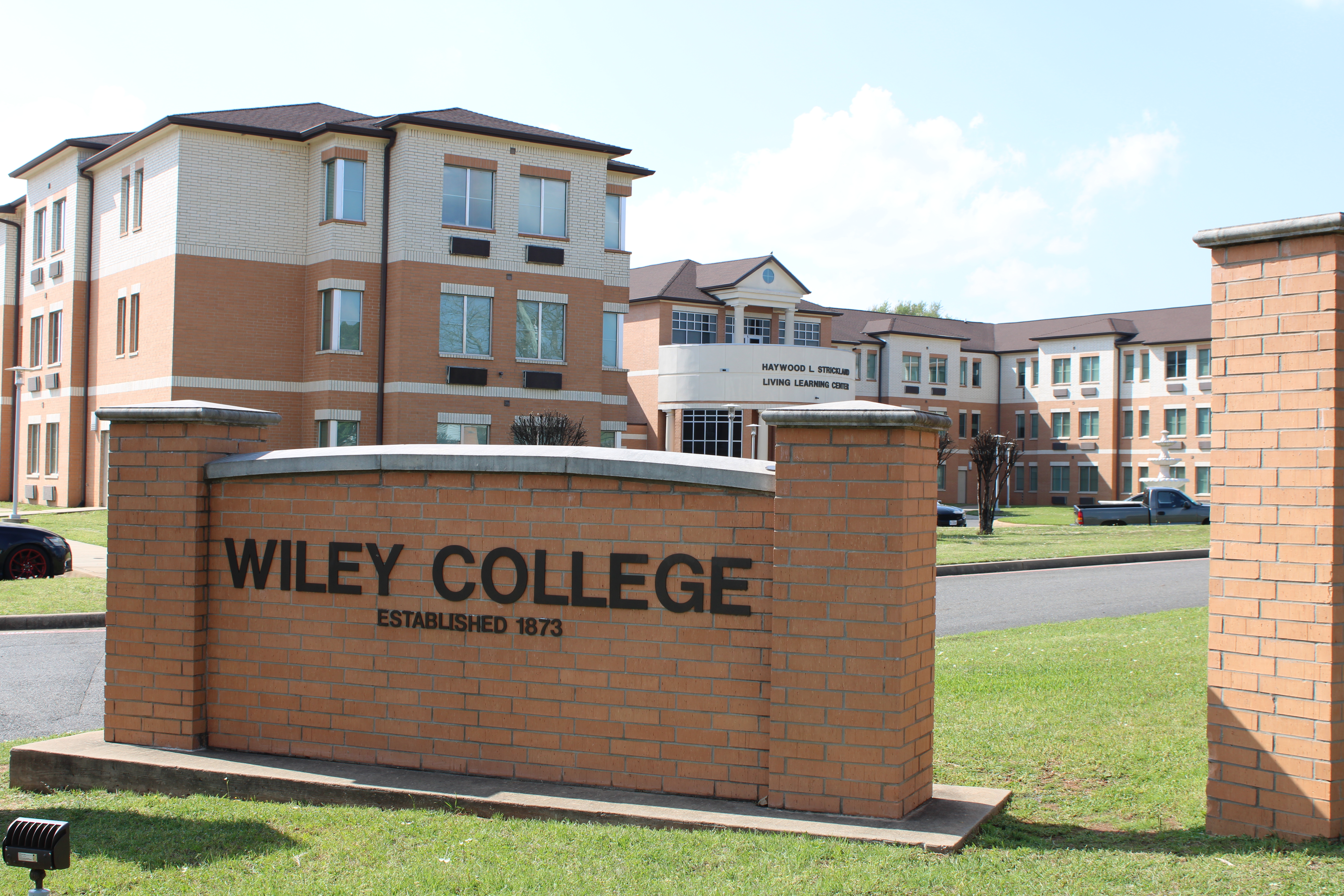
Haywood L. Strickland Hall at Wiley College

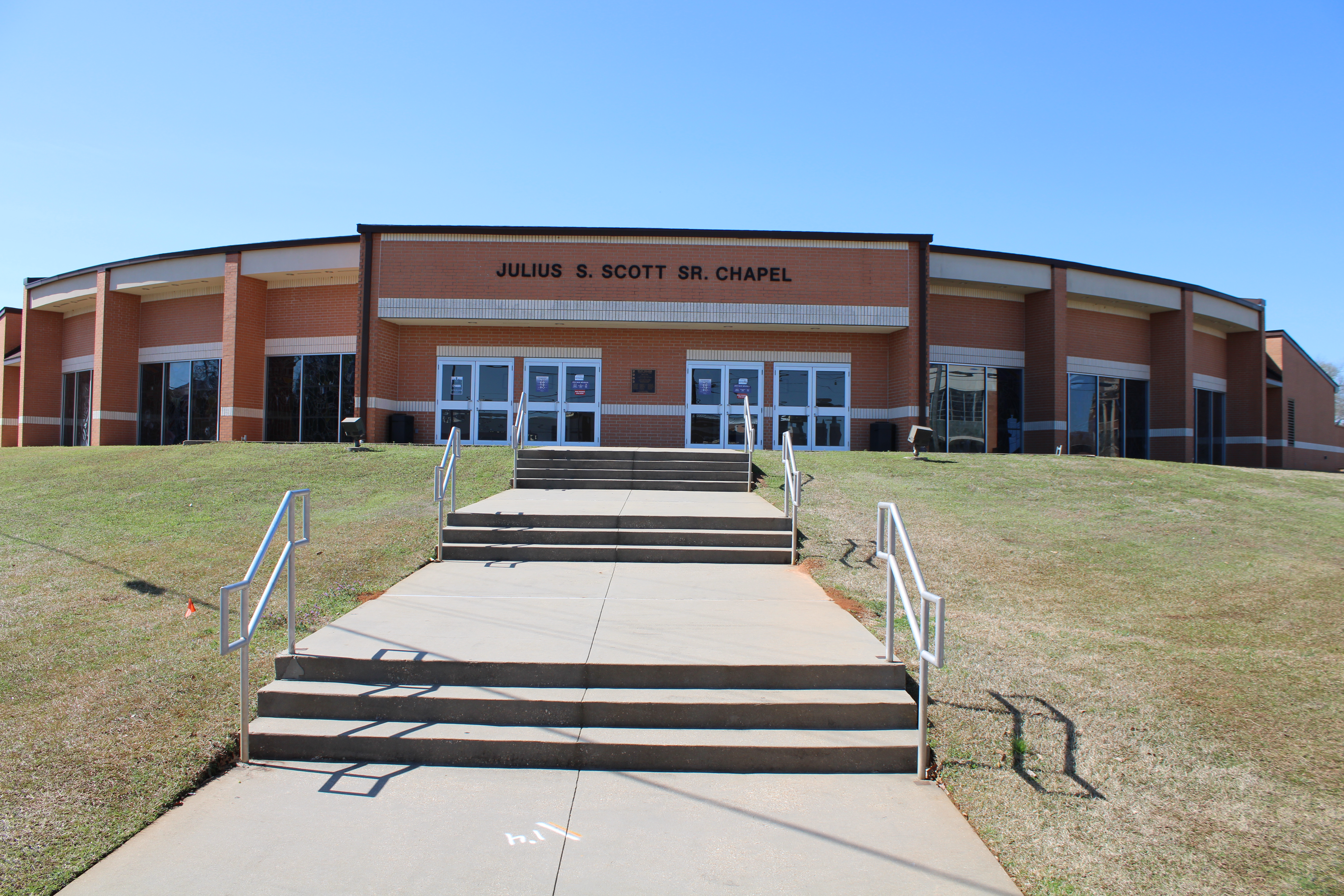
Julius S. Scott, Sr. Chapel at Wiley College

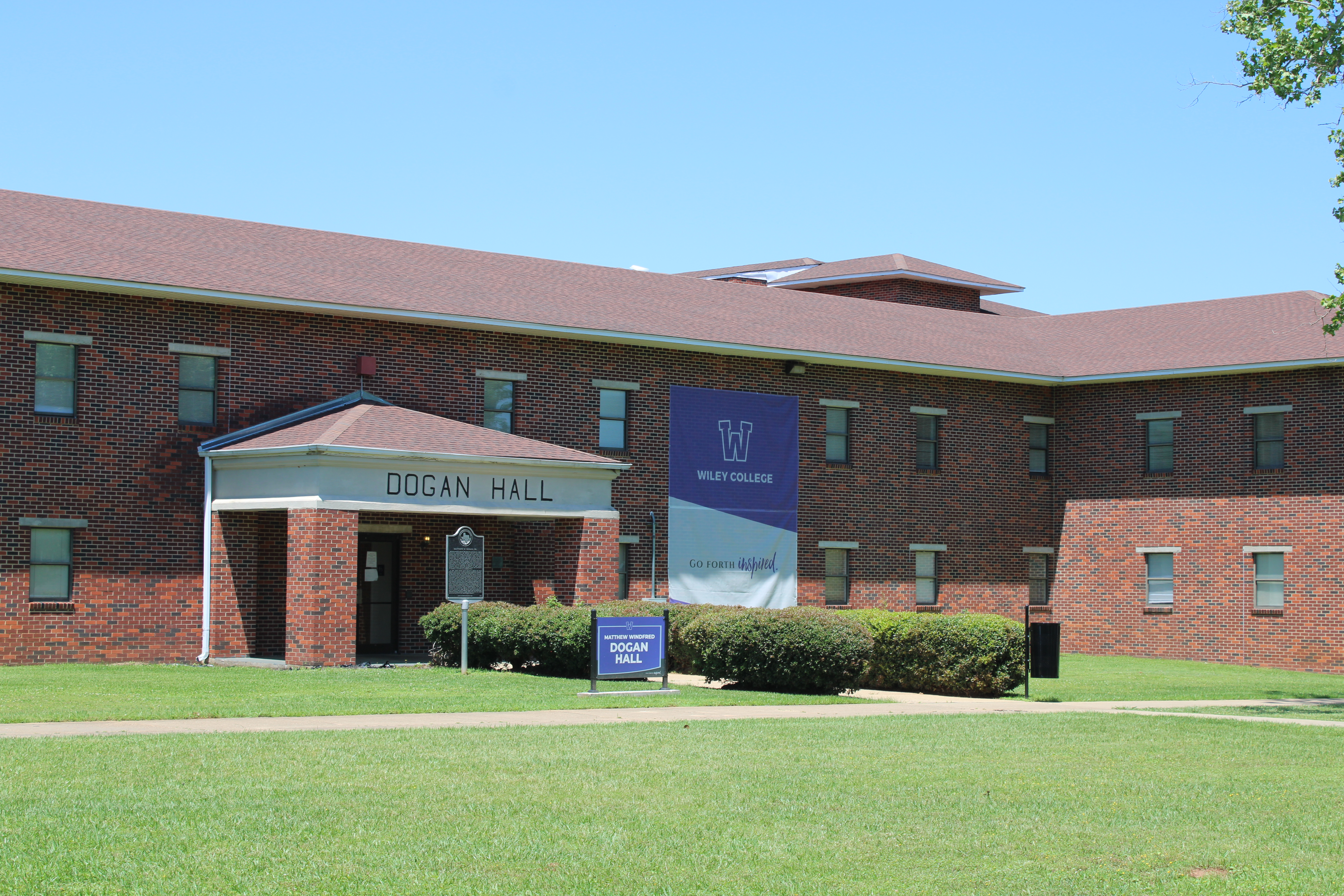
Dogan Hall at Wiley College

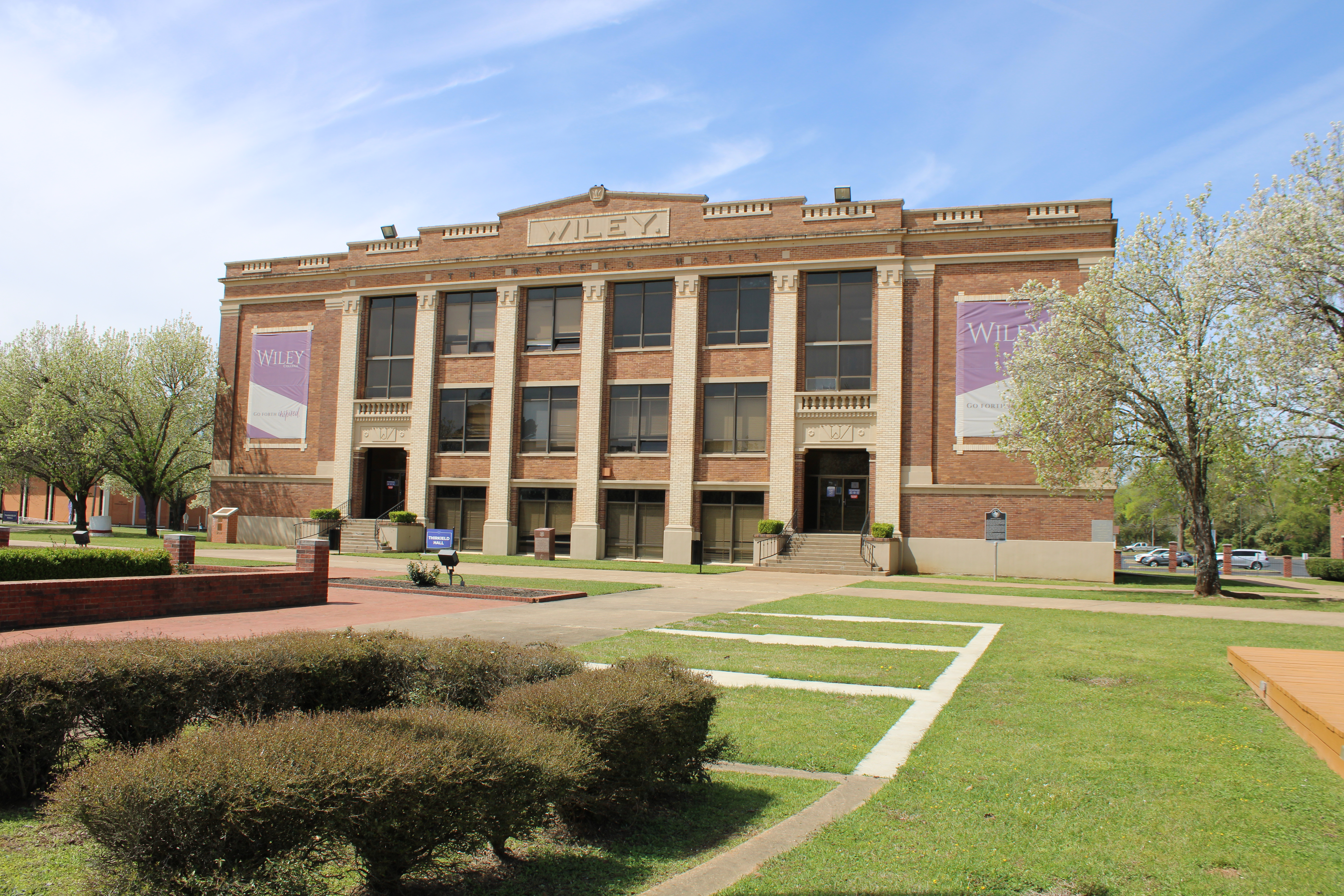
Thirkield Hall at Wiley College

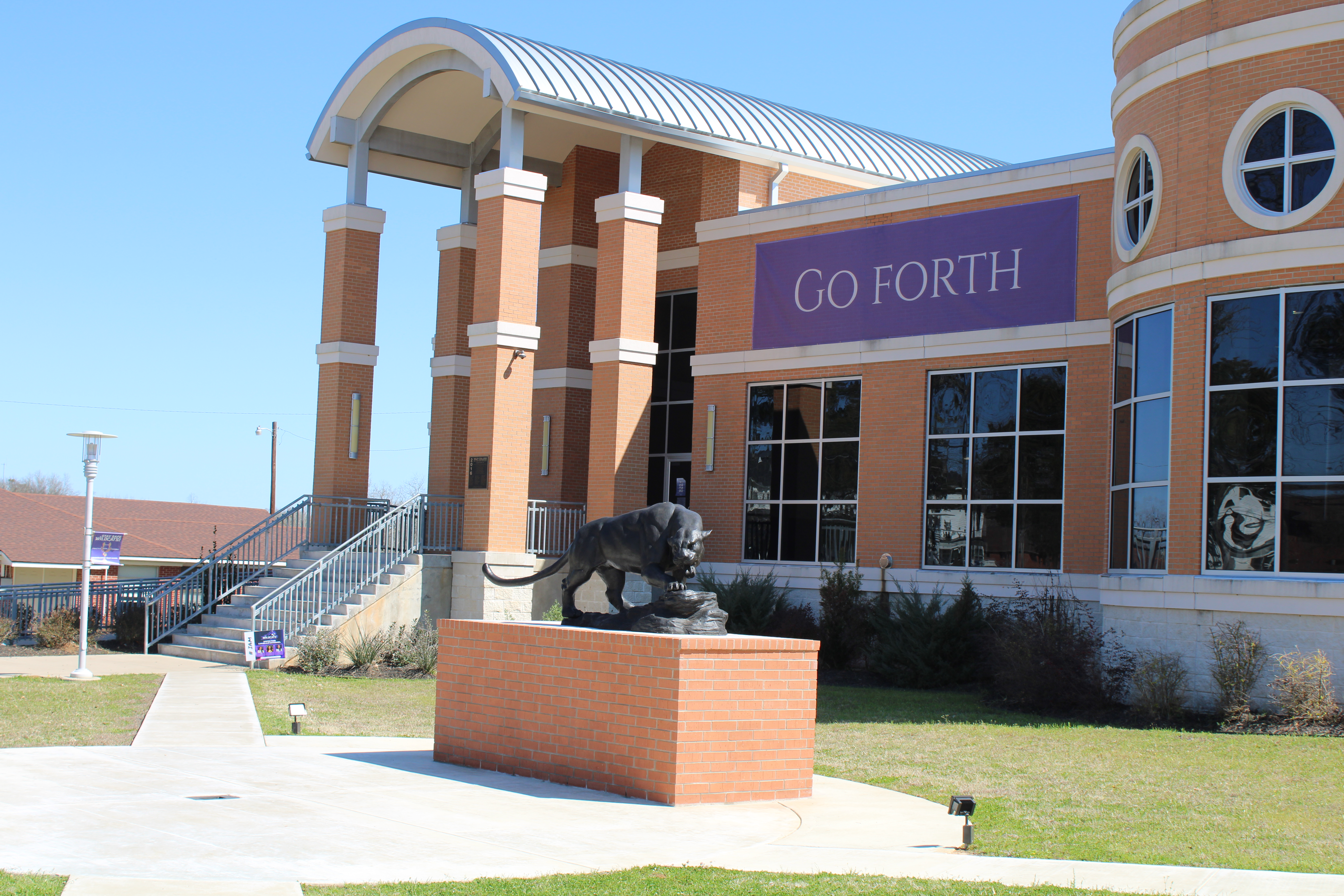
The Fred Thomas Long Student Union building at Wiley College

== Notable people ==
=== Notable faculty ===
Name	Department	Notability	Reference
Melvin B. Tolson	English	Noted poet and English professor	
James L. Farmer, Sr.		First black Texan to earn a PhD, also a professor at Wiley	
Fred T. Long	Athletics	Athletic director and head football coach	
Harry Long	Biology	Head of biology department and asst. football coach	
Anderson Delano Macklin	Fine art	Visual artist, professor, art historian, and author	
Reuben Shannon Lovinggood	Latin and Greek courses	Classical scholar and former president of Samuel Huston College (now known as Huston-Tillotson University)	

=== Notable alumni ===
Name	Class year	Notability	Reference(s)
R. E. Brown	1899	Organized the first male quartet, first brass band, first football team at Wiley. Later started the first teacher-training school for African Americans in Louisiana.	
Thelma Dewitty	1941	First African American to teach in the Seattle Public Schools	
James Farmer	1938	U.S. civil rights leader	
Richard E. Holmes		Physician, transferred to Mississippi State University after sophomore year at Wiley to be the first African American to matriculate at MSU	
Conrad O. Johnson		Music educator	
Opal Lee		Activist, "Grandmother of Juneteenth"	
Mike Lewis	1980	NFL	
L. D. Livingston		Negro league baseball outfielder	
Ernest Lyon		Minister, former United States Ambassador to Liberia, and founder of the Maryland Industrial and Agricultural Institute for Colored Youths.	
Walter McAfee	1934	Astrophysicist who worked on Project Diana with the United States Army Signal Corps.	
Henry Cecil McBay	1934	Chemist, college professor	
Willie Pearson Jr	1968	Sociologist, college professor, author	
Oliver Randolph	1904	New Jersey lawyer, politician, and civil rights advocate	
C. O. Simpkins, Sr.		Member of the Louisiana House of Representatives, 1992-1996; retired Shreveport dentist	
Bill Spiller		African-American golfer who challenged the segregationist policies of the PGA	
Heman Marion Sweatt	1934	Plaintiff in U.S. Supreme Court case, Sweatt v. Painter (1950); helped to found Texas Southern University	
Bubbha Thomas	1961	Jazz musician and educator in Houston	
Lee Wilder Thomas		Prominent African-American businessman in the oil industry	
Lois Towles	1933	Internationally renowned concert pianist.	
Dorothea Towles Church		First successful black fashion model in Paris.	
Henrietta Bell Wells		First female member of the debate team subject of the 2007 movie, "The Great Debaters"	
James Wheaton	1945	Actor, director, educator	
Richard Williams		Jazz trumpeter	
