= NAACP Image Award for Outstanding Supporting Actress in a Motion Picture =

American film award

NAACP Image Award for Best Supporting Actress in a Motion Picture
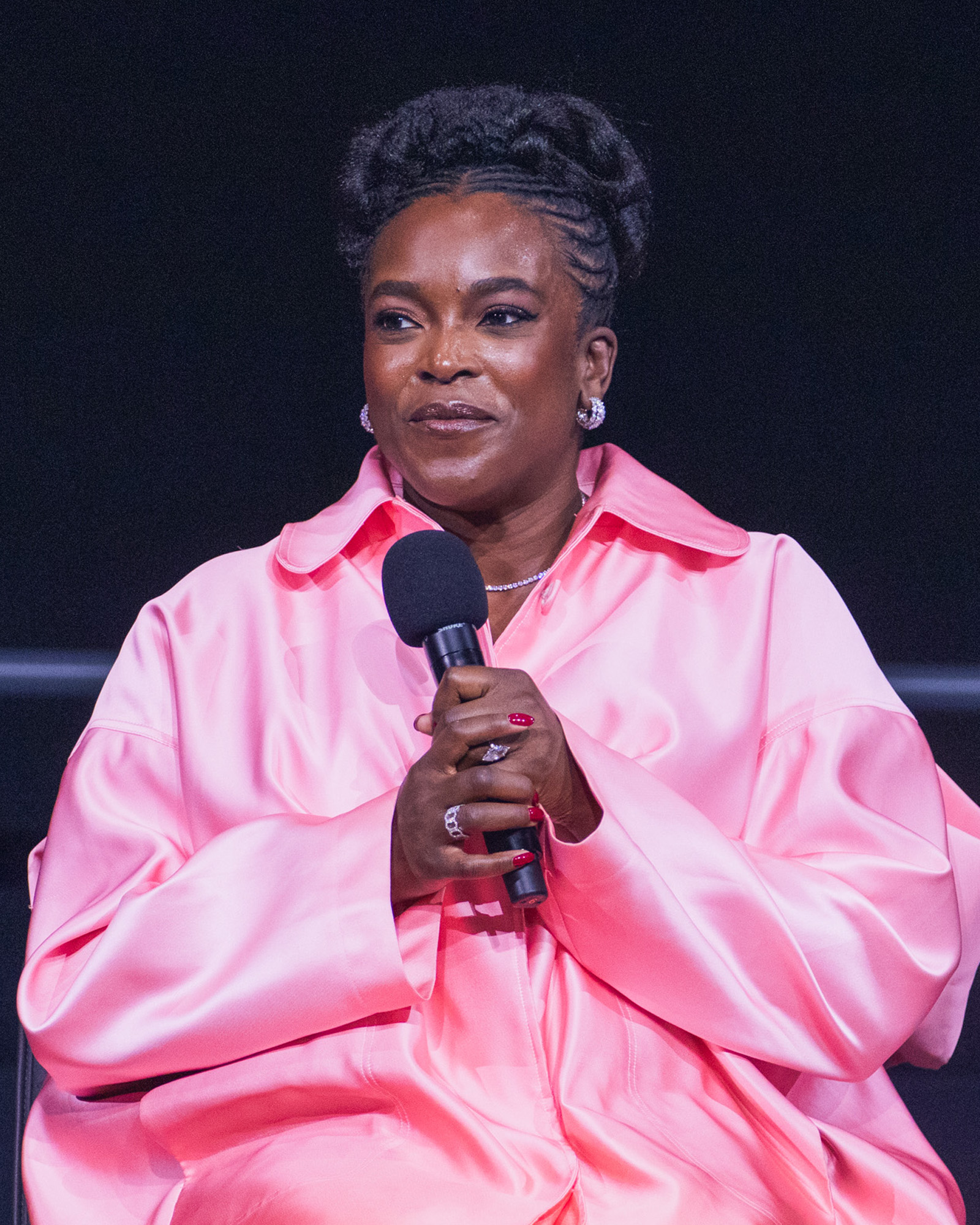
- The 2026 recipient: Wunmi Mosaku
- Awarded for: Outstanding Performance by a Female Actor in a Supporting Role in a Motion Picture
- Presented by: NAACP
- First award: Beah Richards for The Great White Hope (1970)
- Currently held by: Wunmi Mosaku for Sinners (2025)

Highlights
- Most awards: Angela Bassett (4)
- Most nominations: Angela Bassett and Alfre Woodard (7 each)

This article lists the winners and nominees for the NAACP Image Award for Outstanding Supporting Actress in a Motion Picture. The award was introduced in 1970 and was awarded sporadically until its permanent feature from 1995 onwards. Angela Bassett currently holds the record for most wins in this category, with four.

== Winners and nominees ==
For each year in the tables below, the winner is listed first and highlighted in bold.

=== 1970s ===
Year	Actress	Film	Ref
1970	**Beah Richards**	**The Great White Hope**	
1971–1979	—N/a		

=== 1980s ===
Year	Actress	Film	Ref
1980–1985	—N/a		
1986	**Oprah Winfrey**	**The Color Purple**	
1987	**Traci Wolfe**	**Lethal Weapon**	
1987	Helen Martin	Hollywood Shuffle	
1987	Nichelle Nichols	Star Trek IV: The Voyage Home	
1987	Kelly Minter	Summer School	
1987	Sandra Reaves-Phillips	Round Midnight	
1988	**Juanita Waterman**	**Cry Freedom**	
1989	**Suzzanne Douglas**	**Tap**	
1989	Nichelle Nichols	Star Trek V: The Final Frontier	
1989	Rosie Perez	Do the Right Thing	
1989	Tichina Arnold	How I Got into College	

=== 1990s ===
Year	Actress	Film	Ref
1990	**Whoopi Goldberg**	**Ghost**	
1991–1993	—N/a		
1994	**Angela Bassett**	**Malcolm X**	
1994	Vanessa Bell Calloway	What's Love Got to Do with It	
1994	Whoopi Goldberg	Sarafina!	
1994	Jenifer Lewis	What's Love Got to Do with It	
1994	Alfre Woodard	Passion Fish	
1995	—N/a		
1996	**Loretta Devine**	**Waiting to Exhale**	
1996	Maya Angelou	How to Make an American Quilt	
1996	Lela Rochon	Waiting to Exhale	
1996	Regina Taylor	Clockers	
1996	Alfre Woodard	How to Make an American Quilt	
1997	**Loretta Devine**	**The Preacher's Wife**	
1997	Jenifer Lewis	The Preacher's Wife	
1997	Tonea Stewart	A Time to Kill	
1997	Regina Taylor	Courage Under Fire	
1997	Alfre Woodard	Star Trek: First Contact	
1998	**Irma P. Hall**	**Soul Food**	
1998	Angela Bassett	Contact	
1998	Debbi Morgan	Eve's Bayou	
1998	Esther Rolle	Rosewood	
1998	Cicely Tyson	Hoodlum	
1999	**Whoopi Goldberg**	**How Stella Got Her Groove Back**	
1999	Kimberly Elise	Beloved	
1999	Queen Latifah	Living Out Loud	
1999	Thandiwe Newton	Beloved	
1999	Beah Richards	Beloved	

=== 2000s ===
Year	Actress	Film	Ref
2000	**Angela Bassett**	**Music of the Heart**	
2000	Melissa De Sousa	The Best Man	
2000	Sanaa Lathan	The Best Man	
2000	Queen Latifah	The Bone Collector	
2000	Vanessa L. Williams	Light It Up	
2001	**Alfre Woodard**	**Love and Basketball**	
2001	Nicole Ari Parker	Remember the Titans	
2001	Aunjanue Ellis	Men of Honor	
2001	Marla Gibbs	The Visit	
2001	Thandiwe Newton	Mission: Impossible 2	
2002	**Angela Bassett**	**The Score**	
2002	Loretta Devine	Kingdom Come	
2002	Vivica A. Fox	Kingdom Come	
2002	Mo'Nique	Two Can Play That Game	
2002	Jada Pinkett Smith	Ali	
2003	**Halle Berry**	**Die Another Day**	
2003	Nicole Ari Parker	Brown Sugar	
2003	Kimberly Elise	John Q	
2003	Eve	Barbershop	
2003	Queen Latifah	Brown Sugar	
2004	**Alfre Woodard**	**Radio**	
2004	Nona Gaye	The Matrix Revolutions	
2004	Sanaa Lathan	Out of Time	
2004	Jada Pinkett Smith	The Matrix Revolutions	
2004	Gabrielle Union	Bad Boys II	
2005	**Regina King**	**Ray**	
2005	Loretta Devine	Woman Thou Art Loosed	
2005	Sophie Okonedo	Hotel Rwanda	
2005	Jada Pinkett Smith	Collateral	
2005	Sharon Warren	Ray	
2006	**Cicely Tyson**	**Diary of a Mad Black Woman**	
2006	Ashanti	Coach Carter	
2006	Taraji P. Henson	Hustle & Flow	
2006	Elise Neal	Hustle & Flow	
2006	Thandiwe Newton	Crash	
2007	**Jennifer Hudson**	**Dreamgirls**	
2007	Angela Bassett	Akeelah and the Bee	
2007	Thandiwe Newton	The Pursuit of Happyness	
2007	Anika Noni Rose	Dreamgirls	
2007	Kerry Washington	The Last King of Scotland	
2008	**Janet Jackson**	**Why Did I Get Married?**	
2008	Ruby Dee	American Gangster	
2008	Loretta Devine	This Christmas	
2008	Meagan Good	Stomp the Yard	
2008	Queen Latifah	Hairspray	
2009	**Taraji P. Henson**	**The Curious Case of Benjamin Button**	
2009	Beyoncé	Cadillac Records	
2009	Jennifer Hudson	The Secret Life of Bees	
2009	Alicia Keys	The Secret Life of Bees	
2009	Sophie Okonedo	The Secret Life of Bees	

=== 2010s ===
Year	Actress	Film	Ref
2010	**Mo'Nique**	**Precious**	
2010	Mariah Carey	Precious	
2010	Paula Patton	Precious	
2010	Zoe Saldaña	Avatar	
2010	Alfre Woodard	American Violet	
2011	**Kimberly Elise**	**For Colored Girls**	
2011	Whoopi Goldberg	For Colored Girls	
2011	Phylicia Rashad	For Colored Girls	
2011	Anika Noni Rose	For Colored Girls	
2011	Jill Scott	Why Did I Get Married Too?	
2012	**Octavia Spencer**	**The Help**	
2012	Bryce Dallas Howard	The Help	
2012	Maya Rudolph	Bridesmaids	
2012	Cicely Tyson	The Help	
2012	Kim Wayans	Pariah	
2013	**Kerry Washington**	**Django Unchained**	
2013	Taraji P. Henson	Think Like a Man	
2013	Phylicia Rashad	Good Deeds	
2013	Gloria Reuben	Lincoln	
2013	Amandla Stenberg	The Hunger Games	
2014	**Lupita Nyong'o**	**12 Years a Slave**	
2014	Naomie Harris	Mandela: Long Walk to Freedom	
2014	Octavia Spencer	Fruitvale Station	
2014	Oprah Winfrey	Lee Daniels' The Butler	
2014	Alfre Woodard	12 Years a Slave	
2015	**Carmen Ejogo**	**Selma**	
2015	Viola Davis	Get On Up	
2015	Jill Scott	Get On Up	
2015	Octavia Spencer	Get On Up	
2015	Oprah Winfrey	Selma	
2016	**Phylicia Rashad**	**Creed**	
2016	Angela Bassett	Chi-Raq	
2016	Jennifer Hudson	Chi-Raq	
2016	Gugu Mbatha-Raw	Concussion	
2016	Tessa Thompson	Creed	
2017	**Viola Davis**	**Fences**	
2017	Aja Naomi King	The Birth of a Nation	
2017	Mo'Nique	Almost Christmas	
2017	Lupita Nyong'o	Queen of Katwe	
2017	Octavia Spencer	Hidden Figures	
2018	**Tiffany Haddish**	**Girls Trip**	
2018	Regina Hall	Girls Trip	
2018	Audra McDonald	Beauty and the Beast	
2018	Keesha Sharp	Marshall	
2018	Tessa Thompson	Thor: Ragnarok	
2019	**Danai Gurira**	**Black Panther**	
2019	Letitia Wright	Black Panther	
2019	Lupita Nyong'o	Black Panther	
2019	Regina Hall	The Hate U Give	
2019	Regina King	If Beale Street Could Talk	

=== 2020s ===
Year	Actress	Film	Ref
2020	**Marsai Martin**	**Little**	
2020	Jennifer Lopez	Hustlers	
2020	Janelle Monáe	Harriet	
2020	Da’Vine Joy Randolph	Dolemite Is My Name	
2020	Octavia Spencer	Luce	
2021	**Phylicia Rashad**	**Jingle Jangle: A Christmas Journey**	
2021	Anika Noni Rose	Jingle Jangle: A Christmas Journey	
2021	Gabourey Sidibe	Antebellum	
2021	Nia Long	The Banker	
2021	Taylour Paige	Ma Rainey's Black Bottom	
2022	**Regina King**	**The Harder They Fall**	
2022	Aunjanue Ellis	King Richard	
2022	Audra McDonald	Respect	
2022	Danielle Deadwyler	The Harder They Fall	
2022	Dominique Fishback	Judas and the Black Messiah	
2023	**Angela Bassett**	**Black Panther: Wakanda Forever**	
2023	Danai Gurira	Black Panther: Wakanda Forever	
2023	Lupita Nyong'o	Black Panther: Wakanda Forever	
2023	Lashana Lynch	The Woman King	
2023	Janelle Monáe	Glass Onion: A Knives Out Mystery	
2024	**Taraji P. Henson**	**The Color Purple**	
2024	Danielle Brooks	The Color Purple	
2024	Da'Vine Joy Randolph	The Holdovers	
2024	Erika Alexander	American Fiction	
2024	Halle Bailey	The Color Purple	
2025	**Ebony Obsidian**	**The Six Triple Eight**	
2025	Aunjanue Ellis-Taylor	Exhibiting Forgiveness	
2025	Aunjanue Ellis-Taylor	Nickel Boys	
2025	Danielle Deadwyler	The Piano Lesson	
2025	Lynn Whitfield	Albany Road	
2026	**Wunmi Mosaku**	**Sinners**	
2026	Janelle James	One of Them Days	
2026	Jayme Lawson	Sinners	
2026	Regina Hall	One Battle After Another	
2026	Teyana Taylor	One Battle After Another	

== Multiple wins and nominations ==
=== Wins ===
4 wins

- Angela Bassett

2 wins

- Loretta Devine
- Whoopi Goldberg
- Taraji P. Henson
- Regina King
- Alfre Woodard

=== Nominations ===
7 nominations

- Alfre Woodard
- Angela Bassett

5 nominations

- Loretta Devine
- Octavia Spencer

4 nominations

- Whoopi Goldberg
- Taraji P. Henson
- Queen Latifah
- Thandiwe Newton
- Lupita Nyong'o
- Phylicia Rashad
- Aunjanue Ellis

3 nominations

- Kimberly Elise
- Regina Hall
- Jennifer Hudson
- Regina King
- Mo'Nique
- Jada Pinkett Smith
- Anika Noni Rose
- Cicely Tyson

2 nominations

- Nicole Ari Parker
- Viola Davis
- Danai Gurira
- Sanaa Lathan
- Jenifer Lewis
- Janelle Monáe
- Sophie Okonedo
- Jill Scott
- Regina Taylor
- Kerry Washington
- Oprah Winfrey
- Danielle Deadwyler
