= The Ditchdigger's Daughters =

- Written by: Yvonne S. Thornton
- Screenplay by: Jo Coudert; Paris Qualles
- Directed by: Johnny E. Jensen
- Starring: Carl Lumbly; Dulé Hill; Kimberly Elise; Victoria Dillard
- Music by: Philip Marshall
- Country of origin: United States
- Original language: English

Production
- Producers: James Manos Jr. Paris Qualles; Lulu Zezza
- Cinematography: Fernando Argüelles
- Editor: Allan Holzman
- Running time: 92 minutes

Original release
- Release: February 23, 1997

The Ditchdigger's Daughters is a 1997 American television drama film directed by Johnny E. Jensen and written by Yvonne S. Thornton, Jo Coudert, and Paris Qualles, based on Thornton’s memoir.

The film stars Carl Lumbly, Kimberly Elise, Monique Coleman, and Dulé Hill. It aired on The Family Channel on February 23, 1997, and received three nominations at the 19th CableACE Awards performances, for Best Movie, Best Original Song with Kimberly Elise winning for a Supporting Actress in a Movie or Miniseries.

== Plot ==
In 1940s New Jersey, Donald Thornton (Carl Lumbly), a laborer who works long hours and builds his own home. He emphasizes discipline and education, encouraging his daughters to focus on their studies and avoid distractions. His six daughters are Jeanette (Kimberly Elise), Yvonne (Rosalyn Coleman), Donna (Shelley Robertson), Linda (Monica Calhoun), Rita (Erika L. Heard), and Betty (Denice Sealy).

To help support the family and their education, the daughters, guided by their mother, Itasker Thornton, form a musical group called the Thornettes and. then the Thornton Sisters.

== Cast ==
- Carl Lumbly as Donald Thornton
- Dulé Hill as Young Donald
- Victoria Dillard as Tass
- Monique Coleman as Young Donna
- Kimberly Elise as Jeanette
- RaéVen Kelly as Young Jeanette
- Rosalyn Coleman as Yvonne
- Jameelah Nuriddin as Young Yvonne
- Monica Calhoun as Linda
- Malaika Jabali as Young Linda
- Erika L. Heard as Rita
- Kiara Tucker as Young Rita
- Denice Sealy as Betty
- Niaja Cotton as Young Betty
- Lynne Moody as Kathryn
- April Turner as Yvette
- Robin Michelle McClamb as Joy

== Production ==
Filming took place in Wilmington, North Carolina, at EUE Screen Gems Studios, Timme Building, Thalian Hall, Tileston School, Brewery East, and New Hanover High School, from November to December 1996. Paris Qualles adapted the screenplay from Yvonne Thornton’s memoir, with contributions from Jo Coudert, and expanded storylines to explore the daughters’ experiences.

== Release ==
The Ditchdigger's Daughters premiered on The Family Channel on February 23, 1997.

== Reception ==
The film received positive reviews for its story and performances. Lena Williams of The New York Times described it as "heartwarming" and noted its focus on perseverance and family unity. In a review published by the Chicago Tribune, the film was described as a well-intentioned and engaging adaptation that conveyed the core message of the source memoir but necessarily condensed its complexity due to time constraints.

Kimberly Elise won the CableACE Award for Supporting Actress in a Movie or Miniseries for her portrayal of Jeanette Thornton.
