= 19th CableACE Awards =

The 19th Annual CableACE Awards ceremony was held on November 14, 1997, and was the final edition of the CableACE Awards. Below are the nominees and the winners from that ceremony in the main categories.

== Winners and nominees ==
Winners in bold:.

=== Movie ===
- **Miss Evers' Boys** (HBO)
- 12 Angry Men (Showtime)
- Crime of the Century (HBO)
- The Ditchdigger's Daughters (The Family Channel)
- Mandela and de Klerk (Showtime)

=== Miniseries ===
- **George Wallace** (TNT)
- Ivanhoe (A&E)

=== Actor in a Miniseries or Movie ===
- **Gary Sinise** – George Wallace (TNT)
- Robert Duvall – The Man Who Captured Eichmann (TNT)
- Ben Kingsley – Weapons of Mass Distraction (HBO)
- Mandy Patinkin – The Hunchback (TNT)
- Sidney Poitier – Mandela and de Klerk (Showtime)

=== Actress in a Movie or Miniseries ===
- **Alfre Woodard** – Miss Evers' Boys (HBO)
- Bonnie Bedelia – Any Mother's Son (Lifetime)
- Blythe Danner – A Call to Remember (Starz)
- Jena Malone – Bastard Out of Carolina (Showtime)
- Helen Mirren – Losing Chase (Showtime)

=== Supporting Actor in a Movie or Miniseries ===
- **George C. Scott** – 12 Angry Men (Showtime)
- Obba Babatunde – Miss Evers' Boys (HBO)
- Joe Don Baker – George Wallace (TNT)
- Louis Gossett Jr. – Inside (Showtime)
- Arliss Howard – The Man Who Captured Eichmann (TNT)

=== Supporting Actress in a Movie or Miniseries ===
- **Kimberly Elise** – The Ditchdigger's Daughters (The Family Channel)
- Faye Dunaway – The Twilight of the Golds (Showtime)
- Angelina Jolie – George Wallace (TNT)
- Cicely Tyson – Riot (Showtime)
- Alfre Woodard – Member of the Wedding (USA Network)

=== Directing a Movie or Miniseries ===
- **John Frankenheimer** – George Wallace (TNT)
- Allan Arkush – Elvis Meets Nixon (Showtime)
- Kevin Bacon – Losing Chase (Showtime)
- Joe Dante – The Second Civil War (HBO)
- Joseph Sargent – Mandela and de Klerk (Showtime)

=== Writing a Movie or Miniseries ===
- **Anne Meredith** – Losing Chase (Showtime)
- Lionel Chetwynd – The Man Who Captured Eichmann (TNT)
- Marshall Frady and Paul Monash – George Wallace (TNT)
- William Nicholson – Crime of the Century (HBO)
- Reginald Rose – 12 Angry Men (Showtime)

=== Dramatic Series ===
- **Oz** (HBO)
- Avonlea (Disney Channel)
- Dead Man's Gun (Showtime)
- Perversions of Science (HBO)
- Stargate: SG-1 (Showtime)

=== Dramatic or Theatrical Special ===
- **In the Gloaming** (HBO)
- In the Gloaming (Odyssey)
- Tales from the Crypt (Episode: "Confession") (HBO)

=== Actor in a Dramatic Special or Series ===
- **Eamonn Walker** – Oz (HBO)
- Kirk Acevedo – Oz (HBO)
- Terry Kinney – Oz (HBO)

=== Actress in a Dramatic Special or Series ===
- **Rita Moreno** – Oz (HBO)
- Susan Gibney – Bedtime (Showtime)
- Helen Shaver – Poltergeist: The Legacy (Showtime)

=== Guest Actor in a Dramatic Special or Series ===
- **David Hyde Pierce** – The Outer Limits (Showtime)
- Ron Rifkin – The Outer Limits (Showtime)
- David Strathairn – In the Gloaming (HBO)
- Henry Winkler – Dead Man's Gun (Showtime)
- Harris Yulin – La Femme Nikita (USA)

=== Guest Actress in a Dramatic Special or Series ===
- **Glenn Close** – In the Gloaming (HBO)
- Anne De Salvo – Lifetime Women's Festival (Episode: "Women Without Implants") (Lifetime)
- Alix Elias – Lifetime Women's Festival (Episode: "Lois Lives a Little") (Lifetime)
- Amy Hargreaves – Flashback (HBO)
- Dianne Wiest – Avonlea (Disney Channel)

=== Directing a Dramatic Special or Series ===
- **Tony Scott** – The Hunger (Episode: "The Swords") (Showtime)
- Nick Gomez – Oz (Episode: "Visits, Conjugal and Otherwise") (HBO)
- Sturla Gunnarsson – Dead Man's Gun (Episode: "The Impostor") (Showtime)
- Walter Hill – Perversions of Science (Episode: "Dream of Doom") (HBO)
- Christopher Reeve – In the Gloaming (HBO)

=== Writing a Dramatic Special or Series ===
- **Will Scheffer** – In the Gloaming (HBO)
- Lewis B. Chesler and Ed Redlich – Strangers (Episode: "Cinema Verite") (HBO)
- Tom Fontana – Oz (Episode: "Straight Life") (HBO)
- Rupert Holmes – Remember WENN (Episode: "Christmas in the Airwaves") (AMC)
- Howard Rodman – The Hunger (Episode: "The Swords") (Showtime)

=== Comedy Series ===
- **The Larry Sanders Show** (HBO)
- Arli$$ (HBO)
- Mystery Science Theater 3000 (Sci-Fi Channel)

=== Actor in a Comedy Series ===
- **Kel Mitchell** – Kenan and Kel (Nickelodeon)
- Garry Shandling – The Larry Sanders Show (HBO)
- Jeffrey Tambor – The Larry Sanders Show (HBO)
- Rip Torn – The Larry Sanders Show (HBO)
- Robert Wuhl – Arli$$ (HBO)

=== Actress in a Comedy Series ===
- **Sandra Oh** – Arli$$ (HBO)
- Amanda Bynes – All That (Nickelodeon)
- Janeane Garofalo – The Larry Sanders Show (HBO)
- Kerri Kenney – Viva Variety (Comedy Central)
- Tracey Ullman – Tracey Takes On... (HBO)

=== Directing a Comedy Series ===
- **Todd Holland** – The Larry Sanders Show (Episode: "Everybody Loves Larry") (HBO)
- Alan Meyerson – The Larry Sanders Show (Episode: "Ellen, Or Isn't She?") (HBO)
- John Riggi – The Larry Sanders Show (Episode: "Artie and Angie and Hank and Hercules") (HBO)
- Don Scardino – Tracey Takes On... (Episode: "Vegas") (HBO)
- Mike Tollin – Arli$$ (Episode: "The Client's Best Interest") (HBO)

=== Writing a Comedy Series ===
- **Peter Tolan** – The Larry Sanders Show (Episode: "My Name Is Asher Kingsley") (HBO)
- Judd Apatow, John Markus, and Garry Shandling – The Larry Sanders Show (Episode: "Ellen, or Isn't She?") (HBO)
- Jeff Cesario – The Larry Sanders Show (Episode: "Pain Equals Funny") (HBO)
- Becky Hartman-Edwards, John Riggi, and Garry Shandling – The Larry Sanders Show (Episode: "The New Writer") (HBO)
- Jon Vitti – The Larry Sanders Show (Episode: "Everybody Loves Larry") (HBO)

=== Entertainment Host ===
- **Chris Rock** – The Chris Rock Show (HBO)
- Paul Gilmartin and Annabelle Gurwitch – Dinner and a Movie (TBS)
- Craig Kilborn – The Daily Show (Comedy Central)
- Bill Maher – Politically Incorrect with Bill Maher (Comedy Central)
- Dennis Miller – Dennis Miller Live (HBO)

=== Informational or Documentary Host ===
- **Walter Cronkite** – Cronkite Remembers (The Discovery Channel)
- Ed Feldman and Joe L'Erario – Furniture to Go (TLC)
- Steve Irwin – Ten Deadliest Snakes in the World (The Discovery Channel)
- Charles Kuralt – I Remember (CBS Eye on People)
- Emeril Lagasse – Emeril Live (Food Network)

=== Program Interviewer ===
- **Larry King** – Larry King Live (CNN)
- Tom Brokaw – InterNight (MSNBC)
- Bob Costas – InterNight (MSNBC)
- Katie Couric – InterNight (MSNBC)
- Charles Grodin – Charles Grodin (CNBC)

=== Magazine Host ===
- **Ian Wright** – Lonely Planet (Episode: "Ethiopia") (Travel)
- Michael Burger and Christina Ferrare – Home and Family (The Family Channel)
- Bryant Gumbel – Real Sports with Bryant Gumbel (HBO)
- Richard Jeni – What a World (TLC)
- Kurt Loder – Week in Rock (MTV)

=== Newscaster ===
- **Joie Chen** and **Leon Harris** – The World Today (CNN)
- Steve Aveson – Discovery News (The Discovery Channel)
- Brian Williams – The News with Brian Williams (MSNBC)

=== Animated Programming Special or Series ===
- **South Park** (Comedy Central)
- Dr. Katz, Professional Therapist (Comedy Central)
- Johnny Bravo (Cartoon Network)
- KaBlam! (Nickelodeon)
- Steven Spielberg Presents Freakazoid! (Cartoon Network)

=== Children's Special or Series – 6 and Younger ===
- **Mother Goose: A Rappin' and Rhymin' Special** (HBO)
- Blue's Clues (Nickelodeon)
- How Do You Spell God? (HBO)
- Little Bear (Nickelodeon)

=== Children's Special – 7 and Older ===
- **Family Video Diaries** (Episode: "Bong & Donnell") (HBO)
- In His Father's Shoes (Showtime)
- Nick News (Episode: "Kids and Guns") (Nickelodeon)
- Stick Stickly (Episode: "Stuck") (Nickelodeon)
- The Wind in the Willows (The Family Channel)

=== Children's Series – 7 and Older ===
- **Kenan and Kel** (Nickelodeon)
- The Secret World of Alex Mack (Nickelodeon)
- All That (Nickelodeon)
- Mega Movie Magic (The Discovery Channel)
- Ready or Not (Disney Channel)

=== Children's Educational or Informational Special or Series ===
- **Smoke Alarm: The Unfiltered Truth About Cigarettes** (HBO)
- Jaws & Claws (The Discovery Channel)
- Nick News (Episode: "Peace on Earth") (Nickelodeon)
- Pop Sci (The Discovery Channel)
- WAM! Goes to Washington (WAM!)

=== Writing a Children's Special or Series ===
- **Jon Cooksey**, **Katie Ford**, **Ali Marie Matheson**, **Mark Palmer**, **J. David Stem**, and **David Weiss** – Rugrats (Episode: "Mother's Day") (Nickelodeon)
- Franklyn Ajaye and Barry Douglas – Mother Goose: A Rappin' and Rhymin' Special (HBO)
- Anne-Marie Cunniffe and Linda Ellerbee – Nick News (Episode: "Peace on Earth") (Nickelodeon)
- Bruce Harmon – Flashback (HBO)
- Jeff Kindley – Smoke Alarm: The Unfiltered Truth About Cigarettes (HBO)

=== Music Special or Series ===
- **Diva Las Vegas** (HBO)
- Garth Live From Central Park (HBO)
- Honors '97 (VH1)
- Storytellers (VH1)
- Live By Request (Episode: "Tony Bennett") (A&E)

=== Performance in a Music Special or Series ===
- **Bette Midler** – Diva Las Vegas (HBO)
- k.d. lang – Hard Rock Live Presented by Pontiac Sunfire (VH1)
- George Michael and Stevie Wonder – Honors '97 (VH1)
- Mandy Patinkin – Leonard Bernstein's New York (Ovation)
- Tina Turner – Tina Turner's Wildest Dreams Concert (Showtime)

=== Directing A Music Special or Series ===
- **Dwight Hemion** – Disney's Young Musicians Symphony Orchestra (Disney Channel)
- Marty Callner – Diva Las Vegas (HBO)
- Marty Callner – Garth Live From Central Park (HBO)
- David Mallet – Gloria Estefan: The Evolution Tour Live in Miami (HBO)
- Beth McCarthy – 1996 MTV Video Music Awards (MTV)

=== Comedy Special ===
- **Not Necessarily the Elections #1** (HBO)
- Drop Dead Gorgeous (A Tragi-Comedy): The Power of HIV-Positive Thinking (HBO)

=== Stand-up Comedy Special or Series ===
- **HBO Comedy Hour** (Episode: "George Carlin: 40 Years of Comedy") (HBO)
- HBO Comedy Half-Hour (Episode: "Dave Attell") (HBO)
- HBO Comedy Half-Hour (Episode: "Ray Romano") (HBO)
- HBO Comedy Hour (Episode: "Damon Wayans: Still Standing") (HBO)
- HBO Comedy Hour (Episode: "Jon Stewart: Unleavened") (HBO)

=== Directing a Comedy Special ===
- **Fenton Bailey** and **Randy Barbato** – Drop Dead Gorgeous (A Tragi-Comedy): The Power of HIV-Positive Thinking (HBO)
- Terri McCoy – HBO Comedy Hour (Episode: "Damon Wayans: Still Standing") (HBO)
- Rocco Urbisci – HBO Comedy Hour (Episode: "George Carlin: 40 Years of Comedy") (HBO)
- Chuck Vinson – HBO Comedy Hour (Episode: "Sinbad: Nothin' But the Funk") (HBO)

=== Writing an Entertainment Special ===
- **George Carlin** – HBO Comedy Hour (Episode: "George Carlin: 40 Years of Comedy") (HBO)
- Jeff Cesario – HBO Comedy Half-Hour (Episode: "Jeff Cesario") (HBO)
- David Feldman, Jim Hanna, Tom Hertz, Leah Krinsky, Dennis Miller, and Rick Overton – Dennis Miller Live (Episode: "Clinton Revisited") (HBO)
- Ray Romano – HBO Comedy Half-Hour (Episode: "Ray Romano") (HBO)

=== Performing Arts Special or Series ===
- **Leonard Bernstein's New York** (Ovation)
- The 40th Annual Pablo Casals Festival (A&E)
- Follow the Moonstone (Ovation)
- Naked Classics (Episode: "The Prodigy") (Bravo)

=== Variety Special or Series ===
- **The Chris Rock Show** (HBO)
- Mr. Show with Bob and David (HBO)
- The Mr. Vegas All-Night Party Starring Drew Carey (HBO)
- Tracey Takes On... (HBO)
- Viva Variety (Comedy Central)

=== Game Show Special or Series ===
- **Idiot Savants** (MTV)
- Animal Planet Zooventure (Animal Planet)
- Win Ben Stein's Money (Comedy Central)

=== Educational Special or Series ===
- **Great Books** (TLC)
- Addicted (HBO)
- The Bomb Detectives (The Discovery Channel)
- Transplant: The Clock is Ticking (TLC)
- The Ultimate Guide: Snakes (The Discovery Channel)

=== Public Affairs Special or Series ===
- **America Undercover** (Episode: "Talked to Death") (HBO)
- 27th & Prospect: One Year in the Fight Against Drugs (HBO)
- Final Take: Megan's Law (Lifetime)
- America Undercover (Episode: "A Kill for a Kill") (HBO)
- America Undercover (Episode: "Memphis P.D. War on the Streets") (HBO)

=== Environmental/Nature Documentary Special ===
- **Great Siberian Grizzly** (Animal Planet)
- Galapagos: Beyond Darwin (The Discovery Channel)
- National Geographic Explorer (Episode: "Lords of the Everglades") (TBS)
- National Geographic Explorer (Episode: "Savage Garden") (TBS)
- Wildlife Adventures (Episode: "Survival of the Yellowstone Wolves") (TBS)

=== Entertainment/Cultural Documentary Special ===
- **Big Guns Talk: The Story of the Western** (TNT)
- Ballyhoo! The Hollywood Sideshow (AMC)
- Biography (Episode: "Jerry Lewis: The Last American Clown") (A&E)
- The Burger and The King: The Life & Cuisine of Elvis Presley (Cinemax)
- Paul Monette: The Brink of Summer's End (Cinemax)

=== Historical Documentary Special or Series ===
- **Wonderland** (Cinemax)
- The Great Egyptians (Episode: "Mystery of Tutankhamen") (TLC)
- Jerusalem, City of Heaven (The Discovery Channel)
- America Undercover (Episode: "Mumia Abu-Jamal: A Case For Reasonable Doubt?") (HBO)
- Nuremberg (The Discovery Channel)

=== Documentary Special ===
- **Heart of a Child** (HBO)
- Breathing Lessons: The Life and Work of Mark O'Brien (Cinemax)
- Investigative Reports (Episode: "Blood Money: Switzerland's Nazi Gold") (A&E)
- Muhammad Ali: The Whole Story (TNT)
- Taxicab Confessions (HB0)

=== Documentary Series ===
- **Cronkite Remembers** (The Discovery Channel)
- Biography (A&E)
- Medical Detectives (TLC)
- Solar Empire (TLC)
- Understanding (TLC)

=== Documentary Limited Series ===
- **Newsreels to Nightly News** (History)
- Glass Jungle (TLC)
- Raging Planet (The Discovery Channel)

=== Directing a Documentary Special ===
- **Jessica Yu** – Breathing Lessons: The Life and Work of Mark O'Brien (Cinemax)
- Monte Bramer – Paul Monette: The Brink of Summer's End (Cinemax)
- Vince DiPersio and William Guttentag – America Undercover (Episode: "Memphis P.D. War on the Streets") (HBO)
- Marc Levin – CIA: America's Secret Warriors (The Discovery Channel)
- Richard Matthews – National Geographic Explorer (Episode: "King Cobra") (TBS)

=== Writing a Documentary Special ===
- **Sam Hurst** and **Ned Judge** – The Coming Plague (TBS)
- David Darlow – Survival in the Sky (Episode: "Blaming the Pilot") (TLC)
- Greg Kandra and Bob Waldman – Charles Kuralt: A Life on the Road (A&E)
- John Rubin and Dixon Steele – National Geographic Explorer (Episode: "Savage Garden") (TBS)
- Georgia Searle – Big Guns Talk: The Story of the Western (TNT)

=== Talk Show Series ===
- **Inside the Actors Studio** (Bravo)
- Charles Grodin (CNBC)
- InterNight (MSNBC)
- Larry King Live (CNN)
- Politically Incorrect with Bill Maher (Comedy Central)

=== Magazine Show Special or Series ===
- **Moms of a Lifetime Special** (Lifetime)
- The Beef (The Family Channel)
- National Geographic Explorer (TBS)
- Sex in the 90's IX: The Safest Sex of All (MTV)

=== News Special or Series ===
- **Investigative Reports** (Episode: "Meth's Deadly High") (A&E)
- The Death of a Princess (CNN)
- Discovery News (The Discovery Channel)
- Inside North Korea (CNN)
- Investigative Reports (Episode: "Death of Vince Foster") (A&E)

=== Extended News/Public Affairs Coverage ===
- **Rwanda/Zaire Coverage** (CNN)
- The O.J. Simpson Trial: Beyond Black and White (TLC)
- Party Pitch (MTV)
- Politically Incorrect Election Night Special (Comedy Central)
- TWA 800 (CNN)

=== Informational Series ===
- **Emeril Live** (Food Network)
- CNET Central (USA)
- Furniture to Go (TLC)
- FXMD (FX)
- Petcetera (Animal)

=== Recreation and Leisure Special or Series ===
- **Lonely Planet** (Episode: "Ethiopia") (Travel)
- American Voices (CNN)
- Dinner with Oprah (Lifetime)
- Road Rules (MTV)
- Wildlife Encounters (Travel)

=== Business/Consumer Programming Special or Series ===
- **You're on Your Own** (CNBC)
- CyberLife (The Discovery Channel)
- Cyberspace (Episode: "Through the Looking Glass") (TLC)
- Investigative Reports (Episode: "Hooked on a Dream: America's Lotteries") (A&E)
- Super Highway Robbery (TLC)

=== Sports Events Coverage Special ===
- **The Jackie Robinson Game** (ESPN)
- Stanley Cup Final (ESPN)
- NCAA Women's Tournament/Final 4 (ESPN)

=== Sports Events Coverage Series ===
- **Sunday Night Baseball** (ESPN)
- Atlanta Braves Baseball (TBS)
- SpeedWorld (ESPN)
- Sunday Night NFL (ESPN)
- Tour de France (ESPN)

=== Sports News Series ===
- **Golf Central** (Golf)
- College GameDay (ESPN)
- NFL Prime Monday (ESPN)
- SportsCenter (ESPN)
- SportsWeekly (ESPN)

=== Sports Information Series ===
- **Outside the Lines** (ESPN)
- Inside the NFL (HBO)
- Real Sports with Bryant Gumbel (HBO)
- The Sporting Life with Jim Huber (CNN)
- The Sports Reporters (ESPN)

=== Sports Information Special ===
- **Sports on the Silver Screen** (HBO)
- Breaking Through: Our Turn to Play (Lifetime)
- Football America (TNT)
- Long Shots: The Life and Times of the American Basketball Association (HBO)
- NBA at 50 (TNT)

=== Sports Host ===
- **Dan Patrick** – SportsCenter (ESPN)
- Chris Berman – NFL Countdown, NFL Primetime, and Baseball Tonight (ESPN)
- Vince Cellini – CNN/Sports Illustrated (CNNSI)
- Fred Hickman – CNN/Sports Illustrated (CNNSI)
- Bob Page – Page One and MSG SportsDesk (Madison Square Garden Network)

=== Sports Play-by-Play Announcer ===
- **Mike Emrick** – New Jersey Devils (SportsChannel New York)
- Marv Albert – New York Knicks Basketball (Madison Square Garden Network)
- Jon Miller – ESPN Major League Baseball (ESPN)
- Mike Patrick – ESPN Sunday Night NFL and ESPN College Basketball (ESPN)
- Dick Stockton – NBA on TNT (TNT)

=== Sports Commentator/Analyst ===
- **Leigh Montville** – CNN/Sports Illustrated (CNNSI)
- Steve Albert, Bobby Czyz, and Ferdie Pacheco – The Sound and the Fury: Holyfield vs. Tyson II (Showtime)
- Tom Jackson – NFL Countdown (ESPN)
- Joe Morgan – ESPN Major League Baseball (ESPN)
- Dick Vitale – ESPN NCAA Basketball (ESPN)

=== Directing Live Sports Events Coverage Special or Series ===
- **Bob Dunphy** – The Sound and the Fury: Holyfield vs. Tyson II (Showtime)
- Douglas Holmes – Stanley Cup Final (ESPN)
- Bobby Lewis – Rangers Hockey (Madison Square Garden Network)
- Marc Payton – ESPN Major League Baseball (ESPN)
- Bill Webb – Yankees Baseball (Madison Square Garden Network)

=== Fictional Short-Form Programming Special or Series ===
- **Lifetime Women's Festival** (Episode: "The Undertaker") (Lifetime)
- The Girl with Her Head Coming Off (Nickelodeon)
- Short Films by Short People (Episode: "The Adventures of Sam Digital in the 21st Century") (Nickelodeon)
- Ted the Head (Nickelodeon)

=== Non-Fictional Short-Form Programming Special or Series ===
- **Rent** (CNN)
- Before and After Jackie (SportsChannel)
- Director of the Month (TCM)
- The Good Father (CNN)
- Legacy of Pain/Children of the Holocaust (CNN)
