= Kimberly Elise =

American actress

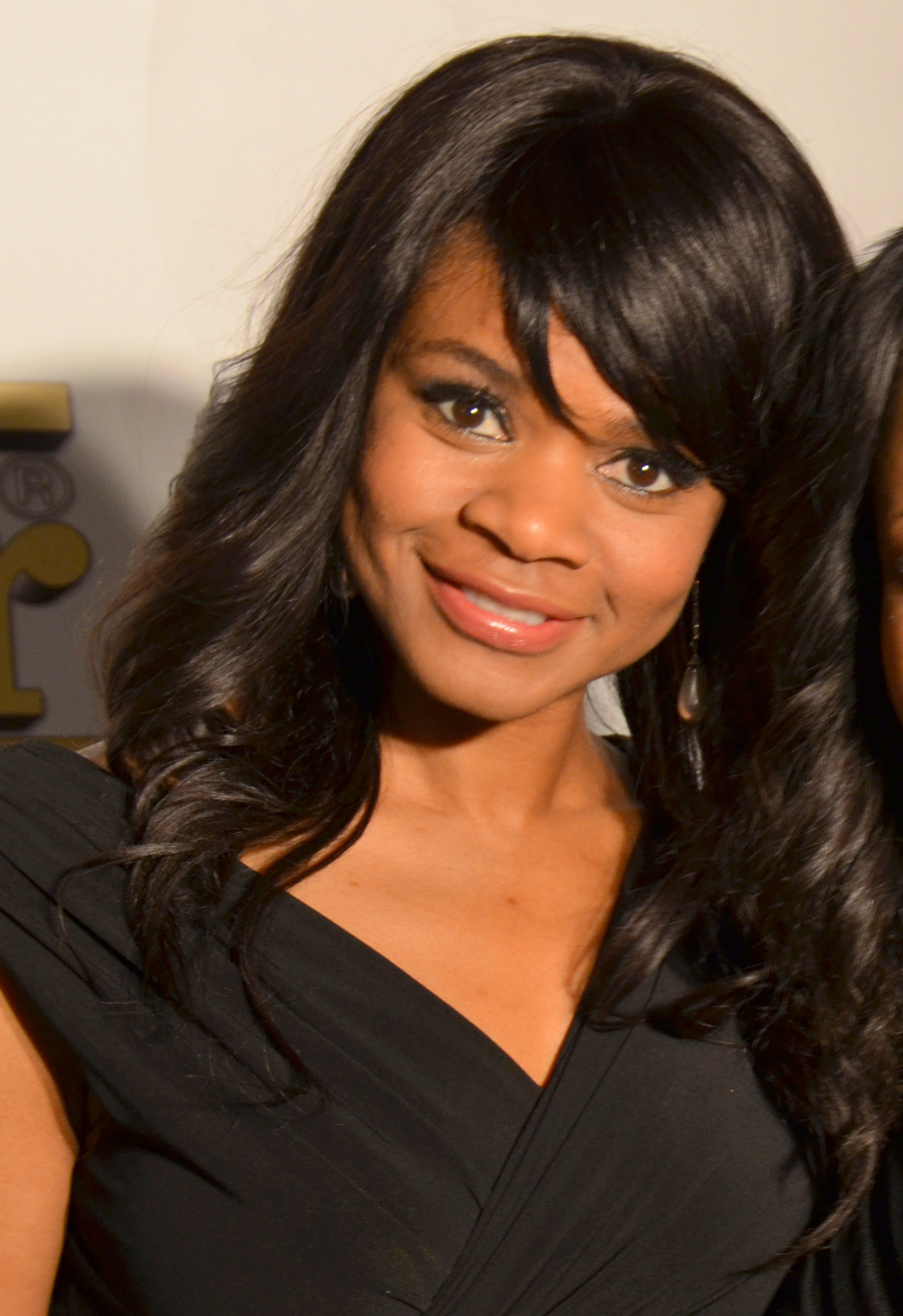
- Elise in 2012
- Born: Kimberly Elise Trammel; Minneapolis, Minnesota, U.S.
- Occupation: Actress
- Years active: 1995–present
- Spouses: Maurice Oldham (m. 1989; div. 2005) George McCrary (m. 2023)
- Children: 2
- Website: kimberlyelise.com (defunct)

Kimberly Elise Trammel is an American actress. She made her feature-film debut in Set It Off (1996), and later received critical acclaim for her performance in Beloved (1998).

During her career, Elise has appeared in films such as John Q., The Manchurian Candidate, and The Great Debaters, all alongside Denzel Washington; Diary of a Mad Black Woman and For Colored Girls, both directed by Tyler Perry; as well as Dope, Almost Christmas, Death Wish, and Ad Astra.

She received a nomination for Independent Spirit Award for Best Female Lead for her performance in the 2004 drama film, Woman Thou Art Loosed, and played the leading roles in a number of made-for-television movies. Elise also starred in the CBS crime drama series Close to Home (2005–07) and the VH1 comedy-drama series Hit the Floor (2013-2016). She is a four-time NAACP Image Awards winner.

== Early life ==
Elise was born as Kimberly Elise Trammel in Minneapolis, the daughter of Erma and Marvin Trammel. She has three siblings. She attended The American Film Institute as a Directing Fellow and at the University of Minnesota earned a BA in Mass Communications.

== Career ==
=== 1990s ===
Elise made her big screen debut in the 1996 crime action film Set It Off (1996) directed by F. Gary Gray, in which she played one of four women who resort to robbing a bank for money. Jada Pinkett Smith, Queen Latifah and Vivica A. Fox co-star in film which became a critical and box office success, grossing over $41 million. In 1997 she was cast in the Family Channel original television movie The Ditchdigger's Daughters, based on the Pulitzer-prize nominated and critically acclaimed 1995 memoir The Ditchdigger's Daughters: A Black Family's Astonishing Success Story, written by Yvonne S. Thornton and Jo Coudert. She received critical acclaim for her role in this film, and in 1997, she was recognized as Best Supporting Actress in a Movie or Miniseries at the 19th annual CableACE Awards. Her performance helped her land a role the next year in Beloved alongside Oprah Winfrey and Danny Glover, a horror-drama film based on Toni Morrison's 1987 novel of the same name, directed by Jonathan Demme. Despite being a box office bomb, Elise received praise for her performance, and well as Chicago Film Critics Association Award for Most Promising Actress and Satellite Award for Best Supporting Actress – Motion Picture. She also received her first NAACP Image Award nomination.

=== 2000s ===
In 2000, Elise starred in The Loretta Claiborne Story playing Loretta Claiborne. The movie was aired as a part of The Wonderful World of Disney at ABC in early 2000. She received good reviews for performance as Claiborne. Later that year, she was female lead in Jamie Foxx's movie Bait, the film was a huge financial failure, and received mostly negative reviews from critics. The following year, she starred opposite Gregory Hines in the biographical drama Bojangles. In 2002–2003, she made guest appearances on the UPN comedy series Girlfriends in which she played an HIV-positive woman, and in the Showtime drama Soul Food.

In 2002, Elise starred alongside Denzel Washington in the crime film John Q. It became a box office success, grossing over $100 million. She next had a leading role in the independent drama Woman Thou Art Loosed portraying Michelle, an abused young woman who finally got the help she needed behind bars. This role won her a Black Reel award for Best Actress and well as received Independent Spirit Award for Best Female Lead nomination. She later starred in the political thriller The Manchurian Candidate, co-starring with Denzel Washington a second time.

In 2005, Elise went to star in the comedy drama film Diary of a Mad Black Woman written by Tyler Perry and directed by Darren Grant. she received positive reviews for her performance, while film received mostly negative reviews. The film still was huge box office success, grossing over $50 million against a budget of $5 million. She won her first NAACP Image Award for Outstanding Actress in a Motion Picture for this movie. From 2005 to 2007, Elise starred in the CBS crime drama series Close to Home, playing the Marion County, Indiana (Indianapolis) prosecutor Maureen Scofield. Her character was killed off in the last episode of the series. The series was cancelled in May 2007. She received NAACP Image Award for Outstanding Actress in a Drama Series in 2006 for this series. She later guest starred in two Shonda Rhimes' dramas; Private Practice in 2007, and Grey's Anatomy in 2009.

In 2007, Elise has appeared in two biographical drama films. First was Pride opposite Terrence Howard based upon the true story of Philadelphia swim coach Jim Ellis. Later, she appeared again opposite Denzel Washington in The Great Debaters, based on an article written about the Wiley College debate team by Tony Scherman for the spring 1997 issue of American Legacy. in 2009, she starred opposite Cuba Gooding Jr. in the television film Gifted Hands: The Ben Carson Story, winning NAACP Image Award for Outstanding Actress in a Television Movie, Mini-Series or Dramatic Special.

=== 2010s ===
In 2010, Elise starred in the drama film For Colored Girls as the battered wife Crystal. The film is based on Ntozake Shange's 1975 original choreopoem for colored girls who have considered suicide / when the rainbow is enuf, and was written, directed and produced by Tyler Perry. While the film itself received mixed to negative reviews, her performance was praised by many critics. One journalist described her as "the great lost Best Supporting Actress contender of the 2010 season". Lisa Schwarzbaum of Entertainment Weekly comments: "The female cast is great, with especially fierce performances from Loretta Devine, Kimberly Elise, Phylicia Rashad, and Anika Noni Rose. But stuck in a flailing production that might just as well invite Perry's signature drag creation Madea to the block party, the actors' earnest work isn't enuf." She won NAACP Image Award for Outstanding Supporting Actress in a Motion Picture for her performance.

Elise has had starring roles in a number of independent films in 2000s, include a leading role in Ties That Bind (2011). She co-starred alongside Whoopi Goldberg in the Lifetime television film A Day Late and a Dollar Short in 2014. In 2013, she began starring in the VH1 comedy-drama series Hit The Floor. In 2015, she has appeared in the well-received comedy-drama film Dope, and the following year co-starred opposite Kerry Washington in the HBO film Confirmation. Later in 2016, Elise starred in the Christmas comedy-drama film Almost Christmas opposite Danny Glover, Gabrielle Union and Mo'Nique. She next starred in Death Wish opposite Bruce Willis, a remake of the 1974 film of the same name. In 2019, she appeared in the science fiction film Ad Astra.

=== 2020s ===
In 2020, Elise was cast opposite Justin Theroux in the Apple TV+ drama series The Mosquito Coast based on the 1981 novel by Paul Theroux.

== Personal life ==
Elise was married to Maurice Oldham from 1989 to 2005. The couple had two daughters, born in 1990 and 1998. Not long after their divorce, in 2007, Oldham died from a "massive blood clot". Elise married George McCrary in August 2023.

Elise is vegan and has worked with PETA to promote the lifestyle.

In 2022, soon after the Dobbs v. Jackson Women's Health Organization ruling by the Supreme Court of the United States, Elise took to Instagram to praise the justices for their ruling when she wrote:

“Millions of babies will be saved from death by abortion due to the overturning of Roe V. Wade. Hallelujah! #allglorybetoGod”

== Filmography ==
=== Film ===
Year	Title	Role	Notes
1996	Set It Off	Tisean 'T.T.' Williams	
1998	Beloved	Denver	
2000	Bait	Lisa Hill	
2002	John Q.	Denise Archibald	
2004	Woman Thou Art Loosed	Michelle Jordan	
2004	The Manchurian Candidate	Eugenie Rose	
2005	Diary of a Mad Black Woman	Helen Simmons-McCarter	
2007	Pride	Sue Carter	
2007	The Great Debaters	Pearl Farmer	
2010	For Colored Girls	Crystal Wallace / Lady in Brown	
2011	Ties That Bind	Theresa Harper	
2013	Highland Park	Toni	
2013	Event 15	Blau	
2015	Dope	Lisa Hayes	
2015	Back to School Mom	Mary Thomas	
2016	Almost Christmas	Cheryl Meyers	
2018	Death Wish	Detective Leonore Jackson	
2018	Hellbent	Karina McCallum	
2019	Ad Astra	Lorraine Deavers	
2020	Environmental Racism PSA	Narrator (voice)	Short
2023	A Snowy Day in Oakland	Theona	

=== Television ===
Year	Title	Role	Notes
1995	Newton's Apple	Bile Duct Supervisor	Episode: "Jungle Survival/Liver/Emus"
1995	In the House	Roulette	Episode: "Nanna Don't Play"
1996	The Sentinel	Candace Blake	Episode: "Black or White"
1997	The Ditchdigger's Daughters	Jeanette	TV movie
2000	The Wonderful World of Disney	Loretta Claiborne	Episode: "The Loretta Claiborne Story"
2001	Bojangles	Fannie	TV movie
2002	The Twilight Zone	Jasmine Gardens/Police Detective	Episode: "Another Life"
2002–03	Soul Food	Estella	Guest Cast: Season 3-4
2003	Girlfriends	Reesie Jackson	Episode: "The Pact" & "The Fast Track & the Furious"
2005–07	Close to Home	Maureen Scofield	Main Cast
2007	Private Practice	Angie Paget	Episode: "In Which Charlotte Goes Down the Rabbit Hole"
2007	Masters of Science Fiction	Tilly Vee	Episode: "Little Brother"
2009	Gifted Hands: The Ben Carson Story	Sonya Carson	TV movie
2009	Grey's Anatomy	Dr. Swender	Recurring Cast: Season 5
2011	Hawthorne	-	Episode "A Shot in the Dark"
2012	Hannah's Law	Stagecoach Mary	TV movie
2013–16	Hit the Floor	Sloane Hayes	Main Cast: Season 1-3
2014	A Day Late and a Dollar Short	Janelle	TV movie
2014	Apple Mortgage Cake	Angela	TV movie
2016	Confirmation	Sonia Jarvis	TV movie
2019	Carole's Christmas	Carole Jordan	TV movie
2019	Star	Dianne Brooks	Recurring Cast: Season 3
2021	The Mosquito Coast	Estelle Jones	Recurring Cast: Season 1
2021	Love Life	Suzanné Hayward	Episode: "Suzanné Hayward & Leon Hines"

== Awards and nominations ==
Acapulco Black Film Festival

- 1999: Nominated – Best Actress for Beloved (1998)

African-American Film Critics Association

- 2010: Won – Best Supporting Actress for For Colored Girls

Black Reel Awards

- 2002: Won – Best Supporting Actress for Bojangles (2001)
- 2003: Nominated – Best Actress for John Q (2002)
- 2005: Nominated – Best Supporting Actress for The Manchurian Candidate (2004)
- 2005: Won – Best Actress, Independent Film for Woman Thou Art Loosed (2004)
- 2006: Won – Best Actress for Diary of a Mad Black Woman
- 2011: Nominated – Best Actress for For Colored Girls
- 2011: Won – Outstanding Ensemble for For Colored Girls

CableACE Award

- 1997: Won – Supporting Actress in a Movie or Miniseries for The Ditchdigger's Daughters (1997)

Chicago Film Critics Association Awards

- 1999: Won – Most Promising Actress for Beloved (1998)
- 1999: Nominated – Best Supporting Actress for Beloved (1998)

Golden Satellite Awards

- 1999: Won – Best Actress in a Supporting Role in a Motion Picture – Drama for Beloved (1998)

NAACP Image Awards

- 1999: Nominated – Outstanding Supporting Actress in a Motion Picture for Beloved (1998)
- 2002: Nominated – Outstanding Actress in a Television Movie, Mini-Series or Dramatic Special for Bojangles (2001)
- 2003: Nominated – Outstanding Supporting Actress in a Motion Picture for John Q (2002)
- 2003: Nominated – Image Award Outstanding Supporting Actress in a Drama Series for "Soul Food" (2000)
- 2005: Nominated – Image Award Outstanding Actress in a Motion Picture for Woman Thou Art Loosed (2004)
- 2006: Winner – Image Award Outstanding Actress in a Motion Picture for Diary of a Mad Black Woman
- 2006: Nominated – Outstanding Actress in a Drama Series for Close to Home
- 2007: Winner – Outstanding Actress in a Drama Series for Close to Home
- 2010: Winner – NAACP Image Award for Outstanding Actress in a Television Movie, Mini-Series or Dramatic Special for Gifted Hands: The Ben Carson Story
- 2011: Winner – Image Award Outstanding Actress in a Motion Picture for For Colored Girls

Independent Spirit Awards

- 2005: Nominated – Best Female Lead for Woman Thou Art Loosed (2004)
