= Pride (2007 film) =

Movie based on swim coach Jim Ellis story

- One-sheet theatrical poster for Pride
- Directed by: Sunu Gonera
- Screenplay by: Kevin Michael Smith; Michael Gozzard; J. Mills Goodloe
- Story by: Kevin Michael Smith; Michael Gozzard
- Produced by: Brett Forbes; Paul Hall; Patrick Rizzotti; Adam Rosenfelt; John Sacchi; Terrence Howard
- Starring: Terrence Howard; Bernie Mac; Kimberly Elise; Tom Arnold
- Cinematography: Matthew F. Leonetti
- Edited by: Billy Fox
- Music by: Aaron Zigman
- Production companies: Lionsgate; Cinerenta; Element Films; Fortress Features; LIFT Productions; Paul Hall Productions
- Distributed by: Lionsgate
- Release date: March 23, 2007
- Running time: 104 minutes
- Country: United States
- Language: English
- Box office: $7.1 million

Pride is a 2007 American biographical film released by Lionsgate Entertainment on March 23, 2007. Loosely based upon the true story of Philadelphia swim coach James "Jim" Ellis, Pride stars Terrence Howard, Bernie Mac, and Kimberly Elise. The film was directed by Sunu Gonera.

The film centers on Jim Ellis (Terrence Howard) and grouchy but caring janitor Elston (Bernie Mac). The two have a short-lived rivalry before becoming good friends.

== Plot ==
In 1974, college-educated Jim Ellis is having a hard time finding employment. While struggling to find something better, Jim, a former competitive swimmer, works at the decrepit Marcus Foster Recreation Center in a poor neighborhood of Philadelphia. His job is to prepare the foreclosure of the Center, causing friction with Elston, the janitor whose job may disappear. The Center includes a dilapidated swimming pool, which Ellis rehabilitates. One day, Jim invites a group of black teens in for a swim. Andre, Hakim, Reggie, Puddin’ Head, and Walt prove to be fairly capable swimmers and with a few pointers, could become great swimmers. In parallel, Jim develops a romantic interest in Sue, Hakim's sister and guardian who wants Hakim to attend school before pool.

With some help from Elston, Jim decides to try to save the swimming pool by starting the city's first all African-American swim team, the "PDR team" for both "Pride, Determination, Resilience" and "Philadelphia Department of Recreation." Once they are joined by Willie, a female swimmer more talented than any of the boys, the prospects of competing against much more experienced white teams begin to improve. However, Black swimmers are not welcome everywhere and the team has to fight overtly racist opposition and treachery, which is what Jim already experienced when he was competing 10 years ago. Throughout their struggles in and out of the swimming pool, Jim and Elston encourage and mentor the kids, helping them not only to become successful at swimming but also in their struggles against prejudice, crime, and poverty.

== Cast ==
- Terrence Howard as Jim Ellis
- Bernie Mac as Elston Johnson
- Kimberly Elise as Sue Carter
- Evan Ross as Reggie Jones
- Tom Arnold as Richard Binkowski
- Alphonso McAuley as Walt Taylor
- Regine Nehy as Willie Thompson
- Scott Eastwood as Jake
- Nate Parker as Hakim Carter
- Kevin Phillips as Andre T. Williamson
- Gary Sturgis as Franklin
- Brandon Fobbs as Puddin' Head
- Jim Ellis, in a cameo, as the man who takes the basketball rim down
- Bianca Markie in a cameo, as the woman who puts the basketball rim back up

== Reception ==
=== Critical response ===
Pride was met with mixed reviews from critics, with a 47% approval rating on Rotten Tomatoes based on 111 reviews, with an average score of 5.50/10. The website's critics consensus reads: "Pride features a typically stellar performance from Terrence Howard, but ultimately falls victim to its over usage of sports movie clichés." On Metacritic, the film has a score of 55 based on 27 reviews, indicating "mixed or average reviews".

The New York Times critic Matt Zoller Seitz noted that the film "illustrates the adaptability and limitations of the sports movie," but concluded that when the film's "sinewy young idealists glide through water to the tune of 'I'll Take You There,' the heart still leaps."

In his stand-up shows, comedian Bill Burr has spoofed the film, calling it as an example of the overabundance of films about white-on-black racism with continuously lower stakes.

=== Accolades ===
Year	Award	Category	Recipient(s)	Result	Refs.
2007	ESPY Awards	Best Sports Movie	Pride	Nominated	
2007	Rome Film Fest	Consiglio dei Bambini Prize	Sunu Gonera	Won	
2008	Image Awards	Outstanding Actor in a Motion Picture	Terrence Howard	Nominated	
2008	Image Awards	Outstanding Directing in a Motion Picture	Sunu Gonera	Nominated	
2008	MovieGuide Awards	Best Film For Mature Audiences	Michael Gozzard	Won	
