= LIFT Productions =

LIFT Productions (an acronym for Louisiana Institute of Film Technology) was the first concerted private sector effort to combat "runaway production" of film and television from the United States. In the 1990s the U.S. market lost over 100,000 production-related jobs, as motion picture and television programming increasingly became manufactured offshore. The outflow of work was in large part due to lucrative incentives offered by Canada, its provinces, and European Union members.

In 2002, at the urging of LIFT founders Malcolm Petal and John J Anderson, Louisiana passed a first-in-the-nation incentive program to compete directly with Canada. LIFT quickly leveraged those incentives to become one of the largest global manufacturers of made-for-television movies, low-budget feature films, music videos, and commercials. During its first five years of operation, LIFT was responsible for well over a billion dollars in production.

By 2007 LIFT had spread throughout the State of Louisiana, as well as opening satellite production houses in Arizona and Connecticut. It had also broken ground on a $200,000,000 production complex in downtown New Orleans.

However, in June 2007 Federal Bureau of Investigation agents raided LIFT's offices, making sweeping accusations of fraud, money laundering, and tax evasion, valued at tens of millions of dollars. Despite the sensational allegations, the investigation petered out, officially closing in 2009 without uncovering any crimes, fraud or abuse at LIFT. CEO and founder Malcolm Petal pleaded guilty in an unrelated bribery case. By that time, though, LIFT was a defunct organization. Its creditors continue to sue the State of Louisiana which refuses to honor tax incentives promised to LIFT, despite the fact that LIFT was cleared of any wrongdoing.

== Early days ==
LIFT was a production house formed by New Orleans attorney Malcolm Petal and producer John J Anderson. Their stated goal was to create a production infrastructure in Louisiana to compete with Los Angeles and New York. Throughout 2001 and 2002 the founders lobbied the Louisiana legislature to pass a production incentive modeled after Canada's. The duo testified that Louisiana could become immediately competitive with much larger markets by recruiting U.S.-based productions back from Canada. The legislature enacted the first of several incentive packages proposed by the LIFT founders on June 1, 2002. That same month LIFT officially opened its doors.

During its early days LIFT concentrated primarily on music videos and commercials. Through its partnership with HSI Productions of California, LIFT produced a continuous stream of videos for a wide array of artists, including Mariah Carey, Jessica Simpson and LeAnn Rimes, as well as several national ad campaigns, including spots for Lincoln and Payless Shoes.

The tax credit program was widely recognized and hailed for its generosity, applying to music videos and commercials, as well as films and television, and also because there was no ceiling on how much credit can be accrued per production or per year. There were three separate sets of production initiatives – a sales tax exemption, a labor tax credit encouraging productions to hire Louisiana labor and an investor tax credit that offered credit on as much as 15% on overall production costs. Petal explained that "without an incentive program it's almost impossible to finance independent films and television movies... So this really brought independent filmmaking, from a production angle, back to the United States, this Louisiana incentive."

== Expanding business ==
LIFT had initially made low-budget feature films for limited theatrical release, like the cult classics Evil Remains and Freshman Orientation. However, in 2004 it expanded aggressively into the movie-of-the-week market producing dozens of films for Lifetime, CBS, and A&E, including Christopher Reeve's last picture, The Brooke Ellison Story, and the critically acclaimed mini-series Elvis, which earned Emmy nominations for the LIFT Founders.

By the end of 2004, LIFT had over 500 employees on payroll and had entered into long-term production and distribution contracts with independent powerhouse Lions' Gate Entertainment. The partnership gained immediate box-office success with major releases, such as the comedy-classic Waiting..., and critical acclaim with art-house offerings such as Bug starring Ashley Judd, which earned legendary director Billy Friedkin the coveted Director's Award at the Cannes Film Festival. That year, LIFT had produced almost $75,000,000 in locally financed production and was on track to double that in 2005 with more than 30 productions.

Meanwhile, LIFT continued to expand the scope of its distribution outlets, releasing Mr. Brooks, starring Kevin Costner, through MGM, and Factory Girl, starring Sienna Miller through the Weinstein Company.

While in 2001, movie production in Louisiana had an impact of just $30 million, by 2003, estimates were in excess of $100 million. According to the Bureau of Labor Statistics, the motion picture industry in Louisiana grew by 22% per year between 2001 and 2007 with wages increasing 8.2% per year during that same period. A report released by the Economic Research Associates for Louisiana Department of Economic Development in 2007 found that the industry supported 6,230 jobs in Louisiana (3,310 directly and 2,920 indirectly), generated $203.7 million, and an average income of $32,700 per job. The "...$429.2 million of direct in-state spending for 2007 amounted to $763 million of economic benefit to Louisiana, when things like rents, royalties, profits, dividends, property taxes and various indirect benefits are factored in."

Wages within the state's motion picture industry increased 8.2 per percent per year between 2001 and 2007, according to the Bureau of Labor Statistics.

In calculating the impact of the motion picture industry on the states economy, the report noted that $429.2 million of direct in-state spending for 2007 ultimately amounted to $763 million of economic benefit to Louisiana, when things like rents, royalties, profits, dividends, property taxes and various indirect benefits are factored in.

== Hurricane Katrina ==
LIFT had nine productions either actively shooting, or preparing to, in and around the New Orleans area in August 2005 (including The Last Time, starring Brendan Fraser and Michael Keaton). Budgets for these totalled over $100 million. Housing, production crews, and new set locations were all in place about a week after the hurricane hit.

When Hurricane Katrina hit, most movie studios abandoned Louisiana, citing the poor infrastructure, dangerous weather, and inability to find insurance. However, LIFT managed to relocate all its Louisiana productions in other parts of the state, including opening a major production center in Shreveport in the far north of the state. "L.I.F.T. offered all of its Louisiana workers, including their families and pets, housing, relocation, and stipends to establish an expansion office in North Louisiana ($1.5 million aid package). ... All 500 workers on L.I.F.T.s payroll continue to receive paychecks without interruption despite closed banks and strained communications".

Today Shreveport is one of the most active production locales in the United States. Thus, Katrina proved to be a significant growth opportunity for LIFT, which survived the disruption through a massive ground effort to move workers and equipment throughout the State. All of LIFT's productions were up and running again in less than a week, while most of the State was still shut down and reeling from the subsequent blast of Hurricane Rita. LIFT also kept the industry in Louisiana by offering all local film workers and their families a generous relief package, which included eight months or more of free housing and benefits, whether they worked on a LIFT production or not.

Subsequently, LIFT was the first production company to return to New Orleans after the storm, shooting Pride, starring Terrence Howard, in the spring of 2006. LIFT was successfully promoting Louisiana's new nickname, "Hollywood South". It "produced more than 30 films and TV shows, adding $250 million in much-needed revenues to a disaster-ravaged state." The industry as a whole had brought $400 million in film investments to Louisiana. MovieMaker magazine ranked the state fourth in filmmaking in 2005. Mayor Nagin also introduced significant initiatives moving New Orleans to the next level of the Trinity Industry with film, music, and video game production, and created a National Film Advisory Board to assist in making New Orleans a top-of-the-line place to film movies.

Prospects and hopes remained high. "Petal [saw] film production as a great way to keep skilled labor in Louisiana." "There's a job for every trade. You know, there's carpenters and electricians and hairdressers. And every business in town gets used. The dry cleaners and the hotels and the car rental services. So the money gets out of the community fast. It's non-polluting, unlike a lot of other businesses that we could attract down here." At that time LIFT was employing up to 500 people at wages starting at $20/hour.

== The "Film Factory" ==
The Friday before Hurricane Katrina hit, LIFT purchased 18 acres (73,000 m^{2}) of land in downtown New Orleans, west of the French Quarter (intersection of St. Louis & Galvez Streets) to build a $200,000,000, state-of-the-art production complex. The 320,000-square-foot (30,000 m^{2}) Film Factory was to be built to withstand extreme weather events and to international standards for essential facilities. The plans included: Seven Class A sound stages (two devoted to film school productions), movie and television production support spaces, production offices, central wardrobe and props, a full service film and media education center. It was also designed to house two digital media incubator labs, one for development of gaming and artificial intelligence and the second for the development of animation productions. It was to be the first facility in the United States to house a state-of-the-art training institute on an active motion picture studio lot. Within five years the school would have been training 750 residents a year for careers in the Louisiana production market.

Film Factory Main Entrance Rendering

Film Factory Commissary Entrance Rendering

Film Factory was not just a building, but a massive attempt to build the first Hollywood studio outside of Hollywood, in the history of motion pictures. It included major strategic partnerships, like one with Lions' Gate which had agreed to move many of its core operations to Louisiana and house them at the Film Factory, as well as top vendors and suppliers, such as Panavision and Kodak.

According to third-party studies 1,200 motion picture production jobs were projected in Louisiana in 2009–2010. The Film Factory was to create 5,000 jobs in its first year, and 20,000 jobs by the time it reached its peak of operations. Located in the Treme area abutting downtown New Orleans—the poorest census tract in the country—the Film Factory was an ambitious effort to revitalize one of the poorest cities in the United States. Similarly a Tulane study estimated that when the production studio and film institute came online in 2008 it would create nearly 2,253 direct and 1,517 indirect jobs and adding $131 million in payroll.

On October 19, 2006, Film Factory officially broke ground, with a golden shovel ceremony officiated by Louisiana Governor Kathleen Blanco, New Orleans Mayor C. Ray Nagin, and his political opponent Lieutenant Governor, Mitch Landrieu. Completion was scheduled for the last quarter of 2008. The vertically-integrated business boasted a $180,000,000 development deal with Element Films (the movie division of billionaire club impresario Sam Nazarian's SBE Entertainment empire) and a $50,000,000 revolving line of credit with Merrill-Lynch to distribute films through Lions Gate and MGM. If successful, the Film Factory would have transformed LIFT into a major studio, and catapulted New Orleans' economic standing well past its regional competitors, putting it on an economic footing with New York, Los Angeles, and Chicago.

Within five years the development’s 12-month vocational school was to train 750 local residents per year for the high-paying jobs in the Louisiana production market. "From carpenters to hairdressers; from electricians to graphic artists; from visual artists to caterers, there is a career in the Film industry for every ambition and natural talent," announced CEO Petal at the Film Factory ground-breaking. "And what's more these are union jobs, with pension and health benefits, and starting salaries from $20 to $45 per hour. These are careers that will allow the people of Treme to build dignified lives on single salaries, own homes, pay for college." The City's Executive Director of Arts and Entertainment, Ernest Collins, and Rep. Steve Scalise R-Jefferson expressed the importance of this infrastructure development to the sustainability of the film industry in Louisiana. Petal stated at the time, "We've brought a lot of the industry here with cash. The trick is to not have that be the sole reason people come here. We have to try to leverage the tax incentives to build a more well-rounded industry... This will show people that they can build a career here. People have to feel that it's real to invest time in it."

== FBI raid ==
On June 1, 2007, FBI and IRS agents raided LIFT's offices. Unnamed federal sources and news reports indicated that the U.S. Attorney's office believed LIFT had been involved in massive fraud. Some estimates topped $100,000,000.

The underwriters of the Film Factory soon withdrew. LIFT tried to maintain its business, but the Louisiana Department of Economic Development banned all LIFT-related productions in the midst of all the publicity, drying up all of its development and distribution deals.

The multi-agency U.S. Department of Justice investigation lasted over five years and cast a wide net, serving grand jury subpoenas on major Hollywood studios, law firms, brokerages, and CPAs. FBI and IRS agents from New York, Ohio, Texas and California expended thousands of man-hours, including multiple interviews of Kevin Costner (the star of the LIFT release Mr. Brooks). Despite its wide scope, the investigation failed to turn up any evidence of fraud or abuse of tax credits, as United States Attorney James B. Letten had proclaimed at the outset.

William Bradley, an attorney who sometimes represented LIFT, pleaded guilty to paying a bribe to Mark Smith, the Louisiana Film Commissioner, in a matter unrelated to LIFT. He admitted receiving a $135,000 fee from LIFT CEO Malcolm Petal to help convince the State of Louisiana to allow popular music festivals like JazzFest, Essence, and Voodoo to utilize the film tax credits for their productions. Petal feared that without government assistance, New Orleans would lose these festivals in the wake of Hurricane Katrina. Bradley admitted he paid $65,000 of that fee to Smith, but that Petal had no direct knowledge of the payment.

Petal pleaded guilty to conspiracy to bribe in the matter and received the maximum five-year sentence. During his sentencing proceedings the United States' Attorney's office admitted they had not proved any actual harm caused by the bribe, any gain to Petal, or that Petal had any knowledge that Bradley had made payments to Smith. Nevertheless, Eastern District of Louisiana Judge Lance Africk, a personal friend of United States Attorney Letten, sentenced Petal to the maximum 60 months in prison. Judge Africk stated that Petal need not know of the bribe itself to be guilty of conspiracy to bribe, because in a conspiracy "the right hand does not need to know what the left hand is doing." He opined that the maximum sentence was warranted due to the seriousness of the offense and that Petal had lost his moral compass.

== Litigation ==
On January 5, 2014, after seven years of litigation by the State of Louisiana, claiming LIFT and Petal had committed fraud, a final judgment was issued stating tersely that the State of Louisiana "would like [LIFT's actions] to be considered a fraud perpetrated by an unscrupulous businessman [Petal]. The evidence presented does not support this conclusion." LIFT v. LED, American Arbitration Association Case No.691400023208 (2014).

In April 2014 a federal judge threw out the State of Louisiana's claim that LIFT owed them for over-payment or inflation of tax credits as meritless. In Re: LIFT, Chapter 11 (East. Dist. Of Louis. 2011).

In February 2015, an independent arbitrator ordered the State of Louisiana to pay the first $6.5MM in almost $60MM in tax credits owed to LIFT. LIFT v. LED, American Arbitration Association Case No.691400023208 (2015).

In October 2015, several state officials, including the Secretaries of Economic Development and Revenue were held in contempt of court by a Federal judge for failing to comply with the Federal arbitration decision and LIFT filed a $400MM Civil Rights lawsuit based on the State Officials concerted efforts to keep them out of business and thwart the economic development of New Orleans.In Re: LIFT, Chapter 11 (East. Dist. Of Louis. 2011); and Film Factory vs. Grissom, Barfield, and Moret (East. Dist of Louis. 2015).

== Filmography ==
Films

- Bug
- The Last Time
- Mr. Brooks
- Premonition
- Pride
- Factory Girl
- Five Fingers
- Waiting...

Television

- Elvis (CBS) Miniseries starring Jonathan Rhys-Meyers, Camryn Manheim, Randy Quaid, and Rose McGowan
- Faith of My Fathers (A&E) Movie-of-the-Week starring Shawn Hatosy
- A Perfect Day (TNT) Movie-of-the-week starring Rob Lowe and Christopher LLoyd
- Life Is Not a Fairytale (Lifetime) Movie-of-the-week starring Fantasia Barrino, Viola Davis, Loretta Devine, and Kadeem Hardison
- Not Like Everyone Else (Lifetime) Movie-of-the-Week starring Illeana Douglas
- For One Night (Lifetime) Movie-of-the-Week starring Raven-Symoné, Aisha Tyler and Jason Lewis
- The Brooke Ellison Story (A&E) Movie-of-the-Week starring Mary Elizabeth Mastrantonio and Lacey Chabert; Directed by Christopher Reeve (Reeve’s last project before his death on October 10, 2004)
- The Dead Will Tell (CBS) Movie-of-the-Week starring Anne Heche and Eva Longoria
- Infidelity (Lifetime) Movie-of-the-Week starring Kim Delaney
- Miracle Run (Lifetime) Movie-of-the-Week starring Mary-Louise Parker and Aidan Quinn; Also released as THE UNEXPECTED JOURNEY
- The Madam's Family: The Truth About the Canal Street Brothel (CBS) Movie-of-the-Week starring Ellen Burstyn and Annabella Sciorra
- Frankenstein (USA Network) Movie-of-the-Week starring Parker Posey, Adam Goldberg, and Michael Madsen; Directed by Marcus Nispel (The Texas Chainsaw Massacre)
- Locusts (CBS) Movie-of-the-Week starring Lucy Lawless
- Vampire Bats (CBS) Movie-of-the-Week starring Lucy Lawless
