= Yvonne Thornton =

American obstetrician and musician (born 1947)

Yvonne S. Thornton
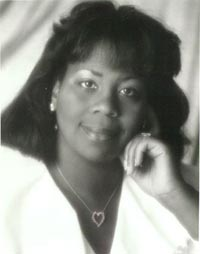
- Yvonne Thornton
- Born: New York City, U.S.
- Education: Monmouth University; Columbia University College of Physicians and Surgeons; Columbia School of Public Health
- Scientific career
- Fields: Obstetrics and gynecology, Maternal-fetal medicine
- Website: www.doctorthornton.com

Yvonne S. Thornton is an American obstetrician-gynecologist, musician and author.

== Biography ==
Thornton was born in New York City and raised in Long Branch, New Jersey as the third of five children to Donald (1925–1983) and Itasker Thornton (1915–1977), where she graduated from Long Branch High School. Her father, a ditchdigger, and a veteran of World War II, had a dream for each of his six children, all African-American girls, to become doctors.

Thornton graduated from Monmouth University, and was accepted to medical school at Columbia University College of Physicians and Surgeons. During that summer, Thornton was the first contestant of color to appear on the original Jeopardy! with Art Fleming as host.

Thornton served on active duty in the United States Navy Medical Corps from 1979 to 1982. She was commissioned with the rank of Lieutenant Commander and served as an obstetrician–gynecologist during her tenure.

Thornton was stationed at the National Naval Medical Center in Bethesda, Maryland now part of the Walter Reed National Military Medical Center.

In 1995, Thornton wrote The Ditchdigger's Daughters about her parents' dream of making their children doctors; the success of the book caught Winfrey's eye and landed Thornton a return appearance on the show. The Ditchdigger's Daughters was critically acclaimed, translated into 19 languages and was turned into a television movie produced by the Family Channel in 1997, with Carl Lumbly in the lead role portraying her father (Donald Thornton) and for which Kimberly Elise won Best Supporting Actress at the 1997 CableACE Awards.

In 1996, Thornton received her Masters in Public Health degree in Health Policy and Management from Columbia University School of Public Health. She eventually rose to the rank of full professor and was appointed to the faculty of Weill Cornell Medical College as a Professor of Clinical Obstetrics and Gynecology in 2003. She now holds the faculty position of Professor Emeritus of Obstetrics and Gynecology at New York Medical College. She became the first African American woman in the United States to be board-certified in maternal–fetal medicine.

== Early years ==
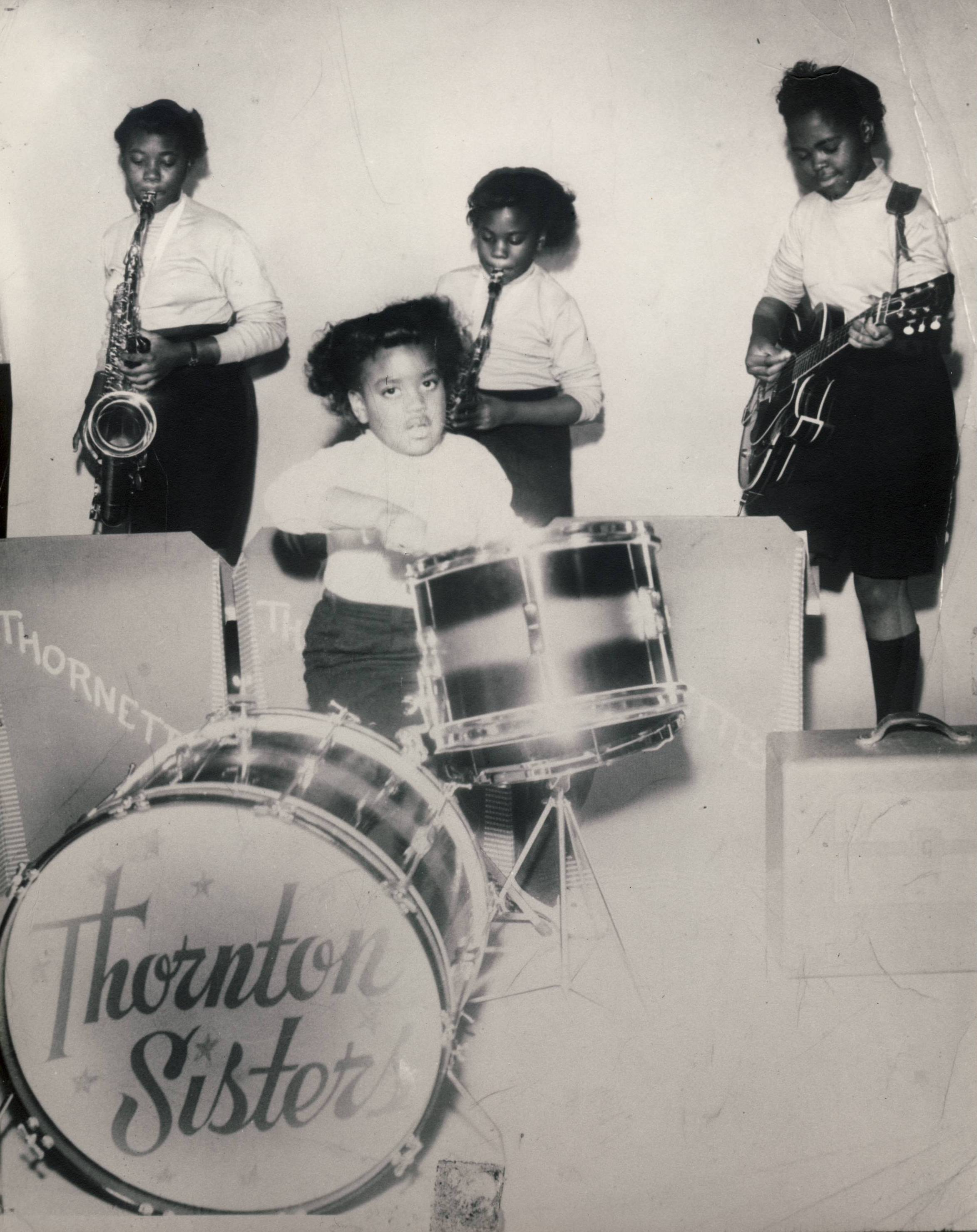
The Thornettes. 1956

Prior to becoming a physician, at age 7, Thornton began playing alto saxophone and at age 9, she and her sisters formed a family jazz band called "The Thornettes". As they grew older, the jazz combo developed into an all-girl Rhythm-and-Blues (R&B) family band known as "The Thornton Sisters". Their mother (Itasker) was the wardrobe mistress, and also played upright and then electric bass. Her older sister, Donna, played tenor saxophone; Jeanette played electric guitar; Linda played drums and was lead vocalist while her youngest sister, Rita, played piano and keyboards. Their father, Donald, was the road manager. During their training, the Thornton sisters attended the Juilliard School of Music together.

At age 11, The Thornton Sisters performed on the then-popular Ted Mack and the Original Amateur Hour. Their performance appears in the Motion Picture, Broadcasting and Recorded Sound Division of the Library of Congress

Two years later, the sextet went on to win an unprecedented six consecutive weeks on Amateur Night at Harlem's world famous Apollo Theatre. The coveted prize was a paid week of appearances with professional artists, such as Shep and the Limelites, Fats Domino, and Ernie K-Doe. A year later, in 1962, The Thornton Sisters were featured at The Brooklyn Fox with Murray the "K" and his Swingin' Soiree, performing with Fabian, The Shirelles, Chuck Jackson, and The Four Seasons.

During that year, The Thornton Sisters signed with Roulette Records and then Atlantic Records. However, the mandated personal appearance tours conflicted with their academic pursuits and the contracts were canceled. The Thornton Sisters also recorded “Watch Your Step” (written by Jeanette Thornton) on the BobSan label in 1965 and “Big City Boy”.

After the Brooklyn Fox, for the next thirteen years (1963-1976), The Thornton Sisters were on the “college circuit” performing on weekends at many fraternities and eating clubs of many colleges, including Amherst, Colgate and Bucknell and Ivy League universities, such as Princeton, Cornell, Dartmouth and University of Pennsylvania in order to defray the cost of their tuition for medical and dental schools.

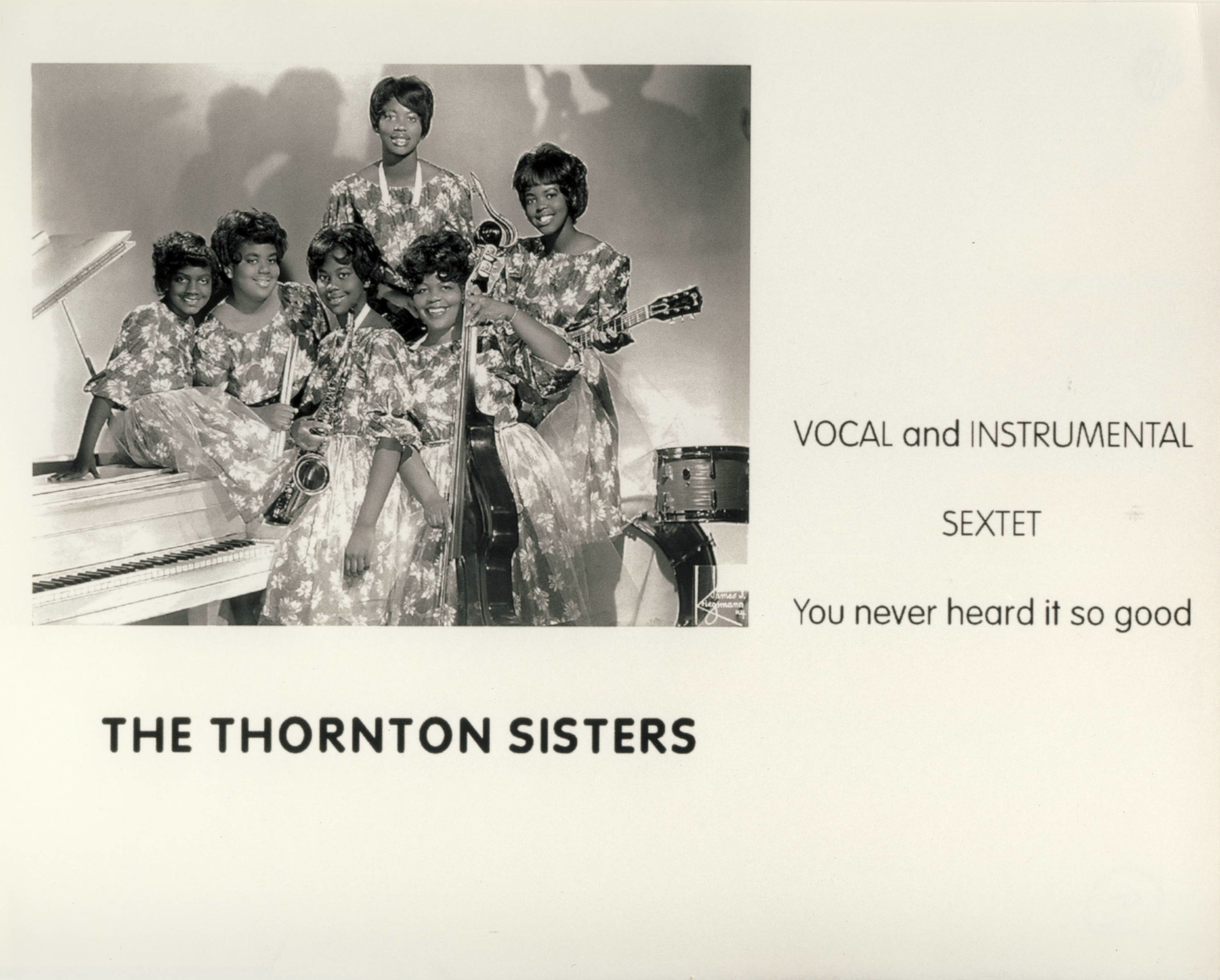
Business card for The Thornton Sisters

== Personal life ==
Thornton married her medical school classmate Shearwood J. McClelland in 1974; he was the director of Orthopaedic Surgery at Harlem Hospital Center in Harlem, New York for 25 years, and he died in 2023. Dr. McClelland Obituary. They have two children, both physicians; Shearwood McClelland, III and Kimberly I. McClelland. She has been a resident of Teaneck, New Jersey.

== Awards and honors ==
Thornton has received numerous honors over the years, including several honorary doctorate degrees. Her second memoir, Something to Prove: A Daughter's Journey to Fulfill a Father's Legacy, was released in December 2010 and was named the Grand Prize Winner of the 2011 New York Book Festival. In 2013, She received the "LIVING LEGEND" award given by the Joseph Henry Tyler, Jr. chapter of The National Medical Association.

In its 250th year, Thornton was honored in 2017 with the Virginia Kneeland Frantz award for Distinguished Women in Medicine, which is the highest recognition for an alumna of the Columbia University College of Physicians and Surgeons.

== Research and scholarly contributions ==
Yvonne S. Thornton is a perinatologist whose clinical research and academic work have significantly influenced maternal-fetal medicine, prenatal diagnostics, and obstetric care.

=== Prenatal diagnostics and chorionic villus sampling (CVS) ===
Thornton is known for her instrumental role in refining and advocating for chorionic villus sampling (CVS), a prenatal diagnostic technique that allows early detection of genetic conditions in the fetus, typically in the first trimester. She led clinical trials at Cornell University and collaborated with Thomas Jefferson University to master and teach the procedure. Her work contributed to FDA approval of CVS in the United States and helped establish it as a safer, earlier alternative to amniocentesis. Her publications include Effect of chorionic villus sampling on maternal serum alpha fetoprotein levels,” American Journal of Perinatology.

=== Maternal–fetal medicine ===
Throughout her career, Thornton focused on high-risk pregnancies, performing over 5,000 deliveries and supervising more than 12,000 deliveries. She conducted research on interventions for obesity in pregnancy, including the field's first randomized clinical trial on perinatal outcomes in nutritionally monitored obese women, addressing weight gain prevention and associated maternal-fetal complications.

She also developed practical obstetric innovations, such as the "Thornton Suspenders", a suspension technique for safely delivering morbidly obese patients. Her research emphasized evidence-based, patient-centered care in challenging clinical scenarios.

=== Sickle cell disease ===
Early in her academic career, Thornton participated in research on sickle cell disease, co-authoring "Pharmacology of cyanate, II. Effects on the endocrine system", Journal of Pharmacology and Experimental Therapeutics.

==== Academic leadership and publications ====
Thornton has authored numerous scholarly and educational works, including:

- Textbooks: Primary Care for the Obstetrician and Gynecologist
- Lay and professional books: Woman to Woman and Inside Information for Women

Her scholarly contributions extend beyond the clinic through mentorship and teaching at institutions such as New York Medical College, Westchester Medical Center, Morristown Memorial Hospital, and Columbia University, where she has guided generations of medical students and residents in maternal-fetal medicine.

== Publications ==
- (2018) A Life-Saving and Life-Taking 19th Century Medical Instrument” The Pharos, Autumn, pp. 20–24 http://alphaomegaalpha.org/pharos/2018/Autumn/2018-4-HalperinThornton.pdf
- (2011) Inside Information for Women: Answers to the Mysteries of the Female Body and Her Health. Ludlow Seminars, Ltd. ISBN 978-1-60984-463-9
- (2010) Something to Prove: A Daughter's Journey to Fulfill a Father's Legacy, Kaplan Publishing. ISBN 1-60714-724-6
- (1997) Woman to Woman: A Leading Gynecologist Tells You All You Need To Know About Your Body and Your Health, Dutton Adult. ISBN 0-525-94297-1
- (1997) Primary Care for the Obstetrician and Gynecologist, Igaku-Shoin, New York. ISBN 0-89640-324-6
- (1995) The Ditchdigger's Daughters: A Black Family's Astonishing Success Story, Kensington Publishing Co. ISBN 1-55972-271-1
