= Beloved (1998 film) =

- Theatrical release poster
- Directed by: Jonathan Demme
- Screenplay by: Akosua Busia; Richard LaGravenese; Adam Brooks
- Based on: Beloved by Toni Morrison
- Produced by: Edward Saxon; Jonathan Demme; Gary Goetzman; Oprah Winfrey; Kate Forte
- Starring: Oprah Winfrey; Danny Glover; Thandiwe Newton; Kimberly Elise; Beah Richards; Lisa Gay Hamilton; Albert Hall
- Cinematography: Tak Fujimoto
- Edited by: Andy Keir; Carol Littleton
- Music by: Rachel Portman
- Production companies: Touchstone Pictures; Harpo Films; Clinica Estetico
- Distributed by: Buena Vista Pictures Distribution
- Release date: October 8, 1998
- Running time: 172 minutes
- Country: United States
- Language: English
- Budget: $80 million
- Box office: $22.9 million

Beloved is a 1998 American Gothic psychological horror drama film directed by Jonathan Demme and starring Oprah Winfrey, Danny Glover, and Thandiwe Newton. Based on Toni Morrison's 1987 novel of the same name, the plot centers on a former slave after the American Civil War, her haunting by a poltergeist, and the visitation of her reincarnated daughter. This was the first film produced by Harpo Films.

Beloved received an Oscar nomination for Best Costume Design for Colleen Atwood. The film garnered mostly positive reviews, and both Danny Glover and Kimberly Elise received praise for their performances, but was a box-office bomb.

== Plot ==
Sethe is a former slave living on the outskirts of Cincinnati, Ohio shortly after the Civil War. An angry poltergeist residing in the family home terrorizes her and her three children, causing two of them to run away forever.

Eight years later, Sethe lives alone with her daughter, Denver. Paul D, an old friend from Sweet Home, the plantation Sethe had escaped from years earlier, finds her home and drives off the angry spirit that inhabits it. Afterwards, he proposes he stay and Sethe responds favorably. Shortly after Paul D. moves in, a clean young woman named Beloved, who appears to have a cognitive delay, finds her way into Sethe's yard, and Sethe takes her in.

Denver is initially happy to have Beloved around, but learns that she is Sethe's reincarnated daughter. Nonetheless, she chooses not to tell Beloved's origins to Sethe. One night, Beloved, aware that Paul D dislikes her, immobilizes him with a spell, and rapes him. He resolves to tell Sethe what happened, but instead asks her to have a baby with him. When Stamp Paid, a co-worker of Paul D who has known her for many years, learns of Paul D's plans for a family with Sethe, he pulls a newspaper clipping featuring Sethe and tells her story to the illiterate Paul D.

Years earlier, Sethe was raped by the nephews of Schoolteacher, the owner of Sweet Home. She complained to Mrs. Garner, his sister-in-law, who confronted him. In retaliation, Schoolteacher and his nephews brutally whipped Sethe, leaving a "tree" of keloid scars on her back. Heavily pregnant with her fourth child, Sethe planned to escape. Her other children were sent off earlier to live with Baby Suggs, her mother-in-law, but Sethe stayed behind to look for her husband, Halle. She was assaulted while searching for him in the barn. The Schoolteacher's nephews held her down, raped her, and forcibly took her breast milk.

When Halle failed to appear, Sethe ran off alone. She crossed paths with Amy Denver, a white girl who treated her injuries and delivered her child, whom she named after her. Sethe eventually reached Baby Suggs' home, but her initial happiness was short-lived when Schoolteacher came to claim Sethe and her children.

In desperation, Sethe slit her older daughter's throat, and attempted to kill her other children. Stamp Paid managed to stop her and the disgusted Schoolteacher departed. Sethe is detained for an unknown amount of time, and it is later revealed she was saved from hanging by the prominent Cincinnati family the Bodwins, who knew Baby Suggs.

Paul D, horrified by the revelation and suddenly understanding the origin of the poltergeist, confronts Sethe. She unapologetically justifies herself, insisting her children are better off dead than enslaved. Paul D. departs shortly thereafter in protest. Afterwards, Sethe realizes that Beloved is the reincarnation of her dead daughter.

Elated yet guilty, Sethe spoils Beloved with elaborate gifts while neglecting Denver. Beloved soon throws a destructive tantrum and her malevolent presence causes living conditions in the house to deteriorate. The women live in squalor and Sethe is unable to work, having become physically and mentally drained by Beloved's parasitic nature. Denver becomes depressed yet, inspired by a memory of her grandmother's confidence in her, she musters the courage to seek employment.

Once Denver gets work with the Bodwins, women from the local church visit Sethe's to perform an exorcism. They do this partly from guilt; years before, they hadn't warned Sethe of Schoolteacher's impending arrival. They are comforting the family, praying and singing loudly when Denver's new employer arrives to pick her up for work. Sethe sees him and, reminded of Schoolteacher's arrival, attacks him with an icepick, but is subdued by Denver and the women. During the commotion, Beloved disappears completely and Sethe, freed from Beloved's grip, becomes permanently bedridden.

Some months later, Paul D encounters Denver at the marketplace. She has become a confident and mature young woman. Arriving at Sethe's he finds her suffering from a deep malaise. He assures Sethe that he and Denver will now take care of her. She tells him she doesn't see the point, as Beloved, her "best thing", is gone. Paul D disagrees, telling Sethe that she herself is her own best thing.

== Cast ==
- Oprah Winfrey as Sethe
- Danny Glover as Paul D.
- Thandiwe Newton (credited as Thandie Newton) as Beloved
- Kimberly Elise as Denver
- Hill Harper as Halle
- Beah Richards as Baby Suggs
- Lisa Gay Hamilton as Younger Sethe
- Jason Robards as Mr. Bodwin
- Albert Hall as Stamp Paid
- Harry Northup as Sheriff
- Tracey Walter as Slave Catcher
- Jude Ciccolella as Schoolteacher
- Wes Bentley as Schoolteacher's Nephew
- Irma P. Hall as Ella
- Dorothy Love Coates as M. Lucille Williams

Additionally, Jonathan Demme regular Charles Napier has a cameo as an angry carnie.

== Production ==
Prior to Morrison's receipt of the Pulitzer Prize for Beloved, Winfrey purchased the rights to the novel in 1987; the translation to film then occurred a decade later. There was a conflict over screenplay credit with Akosua Busia demanding sole credit and saying Adam Brooks and Richard LaGravenese got too much. WGA gave credit to all three. Busia said they were all little more than script doctors.

=== Filming locations ===
Street scenes were filmed in the Old City and Manayunk neighborhoods of Philadelphia. Some other scenes were shot on a soundstage in the city's disused (and later demolished) Civic Center.

Shooting also took place on the north side of the Schuylkill River within Valley Forge National Historical Park in Montgomery County, Pennsylvania, and at the Landis Valley Museum in Lancaster, Pennsylvania.

Shooting was done in a field in Fair Hill Natural Resources Management Area in Cecil County, Maryland, at a spot just east of Big Elk Creek and just south of the border with Chester County, Pennsylvania. The State of Maryland subsequently compiled a location map and photographs of the buildings constructed for the film in Fair Hill NRMA.

Filming locations also included New Castle, Delaware.

=== Praise for Winfrey ===
During promotion of the film, Thandiwe Newton said to Vogue magazine, "Here we were working on this project with the heavy underbelly of political and social realism, and she managed to lighten things up ... I've worked with a lot of good actors, and I know Oprah hasn't made many films. I was stunned. She's a very strong technical actress and it's because she's so smart. She's acute. She's got a mind like a razor blade."

== Box office ==
Beloved did not come close to making back its $80 million budget. It grossed only $8,165,551 on its opening weekend, ranking fifth at the box office.

In a 2011 interview, Winfrey said that after being informed on Saturday morning of the film's projected poor performance for its first weekend, she "went into a tailspin". She asked her personal chef Art Smith to make some macaroni and cheese, of which she ending up eating "about thirty pounds [14 kg] worth." She described it as "the only time in my life that I was ever depressed. And I recognized, 'I am depressed', because I've done enough shows [on the topic]. 'Oh, this is what those people must feel like who've been depressed.'"

Director Demme commented: "Beloved only played in theaters for four weeks. It made $22 million—I think that's a lot of money. And the only reason it left theaters after a month was because the Disney corporation that released the picture wanted all the Beloved theaters—where we were doing very well, in a number of situations—but the Walt Disney company wanted those theaters for Adam Sandler's Waterboy. So, we were told that they were gonna bring us back at the end of the year, and they didn't. But the picture did very respectfully."

Beloved dropped to twelfth place in its fourth and final week of wide release. It continued to play in a smaller number of theaters into the holiday season and, by December 27, 1998, had grossed $22,746,521. The film was rereleased theatrically for two weeks in March 1999, making an additional $110,000.

== Critical reception ==
On review aggregator website Rotten Tomatoes, Beloved is currently assigned a 72% "fresh" rating based on 127 critic reviews, with an average rating of 7.8 out of 10. The site's consensus states, "A powerful, emotional and successful film adaptation of the original novel." It has a weighted average score of 58 out of 100 on Metacritic based on 24 critic reviews, indicating "mixed or average" reviews. Audiences polled by CinemaScore gave the film an average grade of "C+" on an A+ to F scale.

Film critic Roger Ebert awarded the film 3 1/2 stars out of 4, praising its cast and emotional weight of the storylines. He wrote that its nonlinear narrative "coils through past and present, through memory and hallucination, giving us shards of events that we are required to piece back together. It is not an easy film to follow. ... The complexity is not simply a stylistic device; it is built out of Sethe's memories, and the ones at the core are so painful that her mind circles them warily, afraid to touch."

Comparing the film and the novel to the Henry James' novella The Turn of the Screw, he noted the use of supernatural elements "to touch on deep feelings" as well as the deliberate lack of a final explanation. He added, "Spirit manifestations come from madness and need not follow logical agendas. It is a remarkable and brave achievement for Demme and his producer and star, Winfrey, to face this difficult material head-on and not try to dumb it down into a more accessible, less evocative form."

He also expressed the view that some of the audience "will not like it—will find it confusing or too convoluted. And it does not provide the kind of easy lift at the end that they might expect. Sethe's tragic story is the kind where the only happy ending is that it is over."

=== Accolades ===
- Academy Awards
  - Best Costume Design: Colleen Atwood (Nominated)
- Chicago Film Critics
  - Most Promising Actress: Kimberly Elise (Winner)
  - Best Supporting Actress: Kimberly Elise (Nominated)
  - Best Cinematography: Tak Fujimoto (Nominated)
- NAACP Image Awards
  - Outstanding Actor in a Motion Picture: Danny Glover (Winner)
  - Outstanding Actress in a Motion Picture: Oprah Winfrey (Nominated)
  - Outstanding Supporting Actress in a Motion Picture: Beah Richards (Nominated)
  - Outstanding Supporting Actress in a Motion Picture: Kimberly Elise (Nominated)
  - Outstanding Supporting Actress in a Motion Picture: Thandie Newton (Nominated)
  - Outstanding Motion Picture: (Nominated)

== See also ==
- List of films featuring slavery
- Margaret Garner
- Infanticide
