= Almost Christmas (film) =

2016 film by David E. Talbert

- Theatrical release poster
- Directed by: David E. Talbert
- Written by: David E. Talbert
- Produced by: Will Packer; Mikael Hed
- Starring: Kimberly Elise; Danny Glover; John Michael Higgins; Romany Malco; Mo'Nique; J.B. Smoove; Gabrielle Union
- Cinematography: Larry Blanford
- Edited by: Troy Takaki
- Music by: John Paesano
- Production companies: Will Packer Productions; Perfect World Pictures
- Distributed by: Universal Pictures
- Release dates: November 3, 2016 (Regency Village Theater); November 11, 2016 (United States)
- Running time: 111 minutes
- Country: United States
- Language: English
- Budget: $17 million
- Box office: $42.6 million

Almost Christmas is a 2016 American Christmas comedy-drama film written and directed by David E. Talbert and starring Kimberly Elise, Mo'Nique, Nicole Ari Parker, Gabrielle Union, Keri Hilson, Jessie Usher, Danny Glover, Omar Epps, John Michael Higgins, D.C. Young Fly, and Romany Malco. The film follows a dysfunctional family that comes together for the holidays for the first time since their mother's death.

Principal photography took place during November and December 2015 in Covington, Georgia. The film premiered in Los Angeles on November 3, 2016 and was theatrically released in the United States on November 11, 2016 by Universal Pictures. It received mixed reviews and grossed $42 million.

== Plot ==
Walter Meyers is a retired automotive engineer who lost his wife Grace ten months earlier. Now that the holiday season is here, he invites his four grown children and the rest of the family to his house for a traditional celebration.

Walter knows that if his daughters Cheryl and Rachel and sons Christian and Evan can spend five days together under the same roof, it will truly be a Christmas miracle. As his children arrive, Walter realizes a perfect Christmas without his wife Grace is easier said than done.

Cheryl, a dentist and the eldest child, arrives for the holidays with her goofy husband Lonnie Maclay, a previously famous basketball player. Shortly after arriving in town, he and a young grocery store worker named Jasmine take a mutual interest in each other.

His eldest son and second born, Christian, struggles with balancing his campaign to become a congressman and his desire to spend time with his wife Sonya and two kids Cameron and Dee. Christian invites his campaign manager along so they can get more work done. His manager helps set him up with potential financial backers.

Meanwhile, Rachel, his youngest daughter and third born, struggles to financially support herself and her daughter Niya due to her recent divorce and studying to become a lawyer.

The youngest, Evan, is a successful football player recovering from a shoulder injury, but when his coach tells him his arm is completely healed, Evan struggles to give up the pain medication.

Throughout their five days together, the Meyers family experiences ups and downs. Rachel and Cheryl trade barbs, Lonnie has an affair with Jasmine (which Rachel discovers immediately), and Christian is pressured to help demolish a part of town that includes a homeless shelter his mother supported.

Out of spite, Rachel invites Jasmine to Christmas dinner to embarrass Lonnie and Cheryl, but when the sisters accidentally find their mother's tin of recipes, they stop fighting and Rachel tries to disinvite Jasmine via voicemail.

On Christmas Day, Evan discovers Walter plans on selling the house and confronts him. The kids are shocked, but Walter stands by his decision. Evan storms off and gets into a car accident. Jasmine arrives for dinner, to Rachel and Lonnie's surprise, and inadvertently reveals their fling to the whole table. Cheryl chases Lonnie off with an old rifle.

Later, in the hospital, Walter helps Evan confront his grief of losing Grace. Cheryl and Rachel make amends, and Cheryl writes Rachel a check to help pay for law school so she can serve as Cheryl's divorce lawyer against Lonnie. Christian tells his potential backers that he will not support the demolition of the shelter. The film ends with Walter finally perfecting Grace's sweet potato pie and deciding to keep the house.

== Cast ==
- Danny Glover as Walter Meyers
  - Keon Rahzeem Mitchell as Young Walter Meyers
- A. Sebrena Farmer as Grace Meyers, Walter's late wife
  - Rachel Kylian as Young Grace Meyers
- Kimberly Elise as Dr. Cheryl Meyers, DDS, Walter's eldest daughter
- Romany Malco as Christian Meyers, Walter's eldest son
- Gabrielle Union as Rachel Meyers, Walter's youngest daughter
- Jessie T. Usher as Evan Meyers, Walter's youngest son
- Mo'Nique as Aunt May Deveraux Johnson-Davis, Walter's sister-in-law
- J.B. Smoove as Lonnie Maclay, Cheryl's husband
- Nicole Ari Parker as Sonya Meyers, Christian's wife
- Omar Epps as Malachi
- John Michael Higgins as Andy Brooks
- D.C. Young Fly as Eric
- Keri Hilson as Jasmine
- Nadej K. Bailey as Niya Meyers, Rachel's daughter
- Alkoya Brunson as Cameron Meyers, Christian & Sonya's son
- Marley Taylor as Dee Meyers, Christian & Sonya's daughter
- Monica Brown as Monica the Waitress
- Gregory Alan Williams as Pastor Browning
- Gladys Knight as Dorothy, Shelter Director
- Tara Jones as Lucy
- Jeff Rose as Brian
- Ric Reitz as Coach Packer
- Elias Talbert as Young Evan Meyers (voice)
- David E. Talbert as Malachi's Mom (voice)
- Donnie Simpson as Radio DJ (voice)
- Lyn Talbert as Young Grace Meyers (voice)

== Production ==
On April 27, 2015, it was announced that Universal Pictures had bought the comedy script A Meyers Thanksgiving from David E. Talbert, who directed the film, with Will Packer producing through Will Packer Productions. The film was first retitled A Meyers Christmas, with its setting moved to the Christmas holidays. In April 2016, Universal Pictures announced another title change for the film, now called Almost Christmas.

Casting for the film was done in late 2015, in Atlanta, Georgia. Principal photography took place in Georgia from early November until December 2015.

== Release ==
Universal scheduled the film for a November 11, 2016 release. A trailer for the film was released April 14, 2016.

=== Box office ===
Almost Christmas was released alongside Arrival and Shut In, and was expected to gross around $15 million from 2,376 theaters in its opening weekend. The film made $507,000 from Thursday night previews at 1,885 theaters and $5.9 million on its first day. It went on to gross $15.6 million for the weekend, finishing fourth at the box office. In its second weekend, the film grossed $7.3 million (a drop of 56%), finishing fifth.

=== Critical response ===
On Rotten Tomatoes, the film has an approval rating of 49% based on 69 reviews, with an average rating of 5.4/10. The site's critical consensus reads, "While far from the worst holiday dramedy audiences could hope for, Almost Christmas isn't distinctive enough to prompt a visit to the theater – or annual yuletide viewings." On Metacritic, which assigns a normalized rating, the film has a weighted average score of 55 out of 100, based on 27 critics, indicating "mixed or average" reviews. Audiences polled by CinemaScore gave the film an average grade of "A−" on an A+ to F scale.

=== Accolades ===
For her performance, Mo' Nique was nominated for the Image Award for Best Supporting Actress at the 2017 Image Awards.

== See also ==
- List of Christmas films
