= Jim Ellis (swimming coach) =

American swim coach

Biographical details
- Born: 1947 (age 78–79); Pittsburgh, PA
- Education: Cheyney State; Cheyney, PA.

Playing career
- 1966-70 (Estimate): Cheyney State; Swim Team
- Position: freestyle swimming

Coaching career (HC unless noted)
- 1971-2010: PDR Swim Club; Nicetown, PA
- 2010-2023: SAK Aquatics; Swim Coach (Krok Aquatics Director)

Accomplishments and honors

Championships
- National Age Group records M. Norment - U.S. National Team; Olympic Trial participants '92-'97

Awards
- ASCA Hall of Fame; President's Award; Int. Swim. Hall of Fame

James Ellis (born 1947) is an American swim coach who founded the PDR (Philadelphia Department of Recreation, or Pride, Determination, Resilience) swim team in the Nicetown neighborhood of Philadelphia, Pennsylvania, as one of the few predominantly Black swim teams largely for intercity youth. He coached the team from 1971 to 2008, at Nicetown's Marcus Foster Recreation Center outside Philadelphia then moved the team to Nicetown's newly built Salvation Army Ray and Joan Kroc Corps Community Center from 2010-2023 where it became affiliated with the Salvation Army Kroc Center. The 2007 feature film Pride is based on his life story, and focused a great deal of attention on the accomplishments of his swimming program.

== Early influences ==
Ellis was born in Pittsburgh, Pennsylvania in 1947, and grew up there. He began swimming at the recently integrated Highland Park pool in Pittsburgh and as a youth took a position as a lifeguard there. By the mid-1960's the Pittsburgh outdoor pools had hired several black lifeguards. Currently the largest outdoor public pool in Pittsburgh, the Highland Park pool was large when Ellis worked there and had been used for swim competitions. In July, 1951, the pool had been the subject of a lawsuit filed by the Pittsburgh Urban League on behalf of League member Alexander Allen which claimed that he had been deprived of his civil rights by being chased from the pool by a group of White teenagers. The Pittsburgh Urban league won the suit, with the court noting that public pools should allow access regardless of race.

=== Education ===
Ellis graduated from Westinghouse High School which had a large black enrollment, and was part of the Pittsburgh Public Schools. He received the honor of having his name placed on the Westinghouse High School Wall of Fame. He swam competitively in high school, and at the collegiate level for Cheney State, an historically Black University near Philadelphia, where he also studied mathematics.

== Career ==
After graduating from Cheyney State, Ellis wanted to get a job as a teacher, but was not able to secure a position. Having previously worked as a lifeguard, he became a water safety instructor at Sayre-Morrie Recreation Center in West Philadelphia. He later became a math teacher at a high school in Philadelphia where he taught for many years.

== PDR swim team coach ==
In 1971, Ellis formed the PDR ("Pride, Determination, Resilience" or "Philadelphia Department of Recreation") swim team at the Marcus Foster Recreation Center in Nicetown, a neighborhood in Philadelphia. The team is recognized as being the first African-American swim team in the country, and Ellis is credited with helping break down stereotypes and diversifying the sport of swimming. His teams were highly competitive locally and nationally. They gained national recognition as a premier training program, sending team members to the swimming trials for every U.S. Olympic team from 1992 to 2007.

In the 1980's, members of Ellis's swim club had received college scholarships for their swimming skills, set national age-group records, and a few had been selected for the Olympic trials. By 2019, over 100 of Ellis's swimming club members were estimated to have received college scholarships. Many talented swimmers, like Michael Norment, came to swim for Ellis' team because of his strong reputation as a coach. Norment became the first black swimmer on the U.S. national team, and later became a swimming coach himself.

=== Closing of Marcus Foster Pool ===
Ellis coached the PDR team from 1971 until 2010. In 2008, the Marcus Foster Pool in Nicetown, where Ellis coached the PDR team, was closed due to disrepair to both the building and the pool and Ellis relocated his team, whose program was associated with Philadelphia's Parks and Recreation Department. By 2019, all but one of the Philadelphia indoor public pools closed, though most outdoor public pools remained open.

For a period after the closing of the Marcus Foster Pool in 2008, and prior to 2010, Ellis conducted his co-ed swim team at the pool at Philadelphia's La Salle University, and in the summer of 2008, taught swimming at Kelly Pool in Philadelphia's Fairmont Park.

== 2007 Ellis biographical film, Pride opens ==
In 2007, the feature film Pride was released, which portrays Jim Ellis and his struggles to establish the PDR team. The film was noted for having received an outstanding performance from lead actor Terrence Howard who played Ellis, but took criticism for its overuse of clichés typical of both sports movies and movies about race. Tough, upbeat, and not looking for sympathy like his high achieving swimmers, Ellis noted that "nasty prejudice" resulting from encountering a "white coach with swimmers from the affluent suburbs"—as depicted in the movie—was not common, and that "in reality there was little of that sort of discrimination against his team." Nonetheless, Ellis did not deny the existence of some forms of prejudice.

== SAKA swim coach, aquatics director ==
In Spring, 2010, the Salvation Army Ray and Joan Kroc Corps Community Center opened in Nicetown, Philadelphia, the same neighborhood as Ellis's prior PDR swim team program at the public indoor Marcus Foster pool. The new Ray and Joan Kroc Community Center cost $108 million which included a $72 million grant from the Kroc Foundation, started by the family of Roy Kroc, particularly Kroc's third wife philanthropist Joan Kroc. $36.3 million was raised regionally from government and private funds. Known as the Jimmy Moran Competition Pool, the 25 meter, 10 lane competition-grade pool was designed for recreational swimming lessons, water polo, and swim meets. Taking an early role, Ellis was influential in designing the pool at the center. The movie Pride, released three years earlier, may have helped focus attention on Ellis's program, as the inclusion of a state-of-the-art swimming pool in the Kroc Center would become a boon for Ellis's swim club.

Since late 2010, Ellis has remained the coach of the Salvation Army Kroc Aquatics (SAKA) program located in the Kroc Center. As of 2023, the pool and Ellis's Aquatics program has remained open and active nearly continuously, and Ellis's program is sometimes referred to as the Philadelphia Department of Recreation Swim Team, though it is no longer directly associated with the Department. By 2011, he had put together a competitive team of about 40 members, and also acted as the Aquatics Director.

== Awards and recognition ==
In May 2007, Ellis received the President's Award from the International Swimming Hall of Fame. In 2015, he was named to the "List of the 30 Most Influential People In Swimming Over the Past 30 Years," selected by USA Swimming and Speedo. Ellis was inducted to the American Swimming Coaches Association Hall of Fame in 2019.

== See also ==
- Inspirational/motivational instructors/mentors portrayed in films
- Pride (2007 film)
